= Geothermal power in Russia =

Geothermal energy is the second most used form of renewable energy in Russia but represents less than 1% of the total energy production. The first geothermal power plant in Russia, which was the first binary cycle power station in the world, was built at Pauzhetka, Kamchatka, in 1966, with a capacity of 5 MW. The total geothermal installed capacity is 81.9 MW, with 50 MW coming from a plant at Verkhne-Mutnovsky.Two other plants were built on the Kamchatka Peninsula in 1999 and 2002. Two smaller additional plants were installed on the islands of Kunashir and Iturup in 2007. Most geothermal resources are currently used for heating settlements in the North Caucasus and Kamchatka. Half of the geothermal production is used to heat homes and industrial buildings, one-third is used to heat greenhouses and 13% is used for industrial processes.

Five major geothermal power plants exist in Russia. Russia currently deveploing a new 100 MW geothermal power plant at Mutnovsky and a 50 MW plant in Kaliningrad.

== Potential ==
Potential resources include the Northern Caucasus, Western Siberia, Lake Baikal, and in Kamchatka and the Kuril Islands. There are estimates according to which the potential of geothermal energy in Russia significantly exceeds the reserves of fossil fuel (up to 10–15 times). Reserves of geothermal water (temperature 40–200 °C (104–392 °F), depth of occurrence up to 3500 m) revealed in Russia are about 14 million m^{3} of hot water per day, which corresponds to about 30 million tons of fuel equivalent.

The most accessible geothermal potential is concentrated in Kamchatka and the Kuril Islands. The resources of Kamchatka's geothermal fields are estimated at 250–350 MW of electricity (according to other sources—2000 MW), the Kuril Islands—at 230 MW, which potentially allows completely covering the needs of the regions for electricity, heat supply and hot water. Substantial volumes of geothermal resources are located in the North Caucasus, Stavropol and Krasnodar regions. In particular, 12 geothermal deposits have been explored in Dagestan, in the Chechnya—14 deposits, in the Krasnodar Krai—13 deposits. In general, the explored resources of the geothermal coolant in the North Caucasus make it possible to operate power plants with a capacity of about 200 MW. In Dagestan, geothermal heat carrier is being extracted for heat supply, more than 100 thousand people use geothermal heating.

In the Kaliningrad Region, there is a geothermal field with a coolant temperature of 105–120 °C, potentially suitable for use in the power industry. There is a project of a binary GeoPP with a capacity of 4 MW in the city of Svetly. In the central part of Russia, the high-temperature geothermal coolant is mainly located at depths of more than 2 km, which makes it economically ineffective to use it for power generation purposes. It is possible to use a heat carrier with a temperature of 40–60 °C (104–140 °F), lying at a depth of 800 m, for heat supply.

In Western Siberia, while drilling oil and gas wells at a depth of 1 km, geothermal resources of the West Siberian artesian basin were discovered, the potential of which is estimated at more than 200 million Gcal per year.

== List of geothermal power stations ==
List of geothermal power stations in Russia

Name	Location	Field	Operator	Capacity (MW)	Annual Generation (average GWh)	Commissioned
Mutnovskaya Power Station	Petropavlovsk-Kamchatsky, Kamchatka Krai		RusHydro	50	322.93	2003
Pauzhetskaya Power Station	Petropavlovsk-Kamchatsky, Kamchatka Krai		RusHydro	14.5	59.5	1966
Verhne-Mutnovskaya Power Station	Petropavlovsk-Kamchatsky, Kamchatka Krai		RusHydro	12	58.3	1999
Mendeleevskaya GeoPP	Kunashir Island, Kuril Islands			1.8		2007
Okeanskaya GeoPP	Iturup, Kuril Islands			3.6		2007

== See also ==
- Energy policy of Russia
- Geothermal energy
- Renewable energy by country
- Renewable energy in Russia
- Wind power in Russia
