= Lake Iset =

Water lake in Sverdlovsk Oblast, Russia

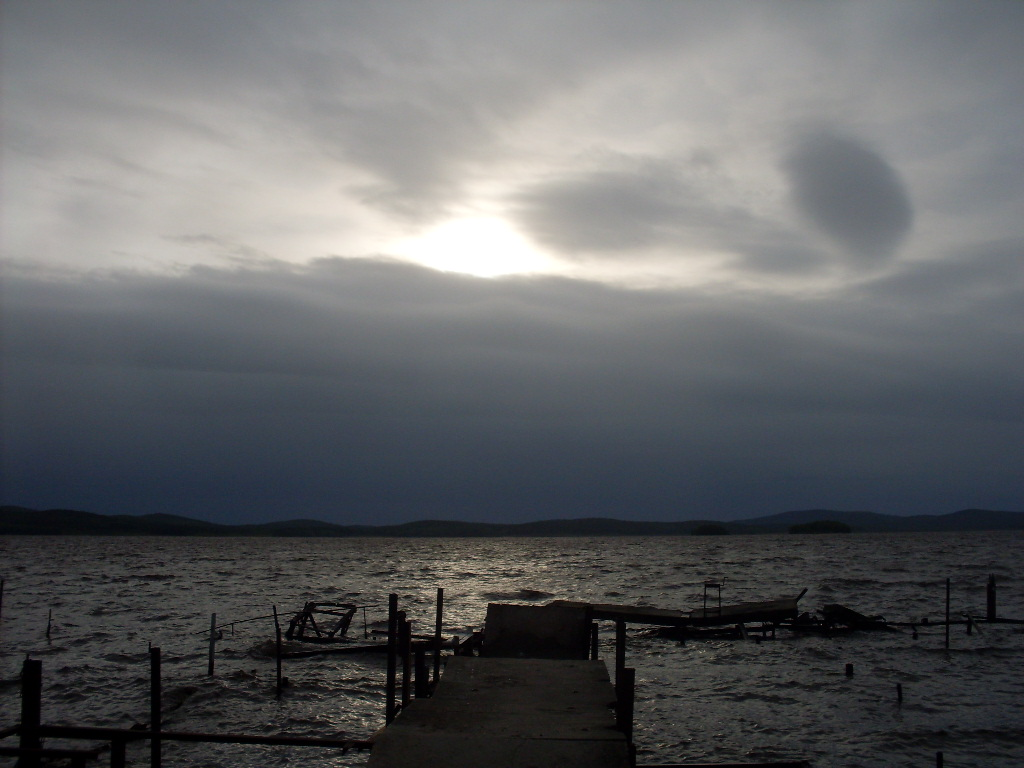
- Iset Lake from Sredneuralsk

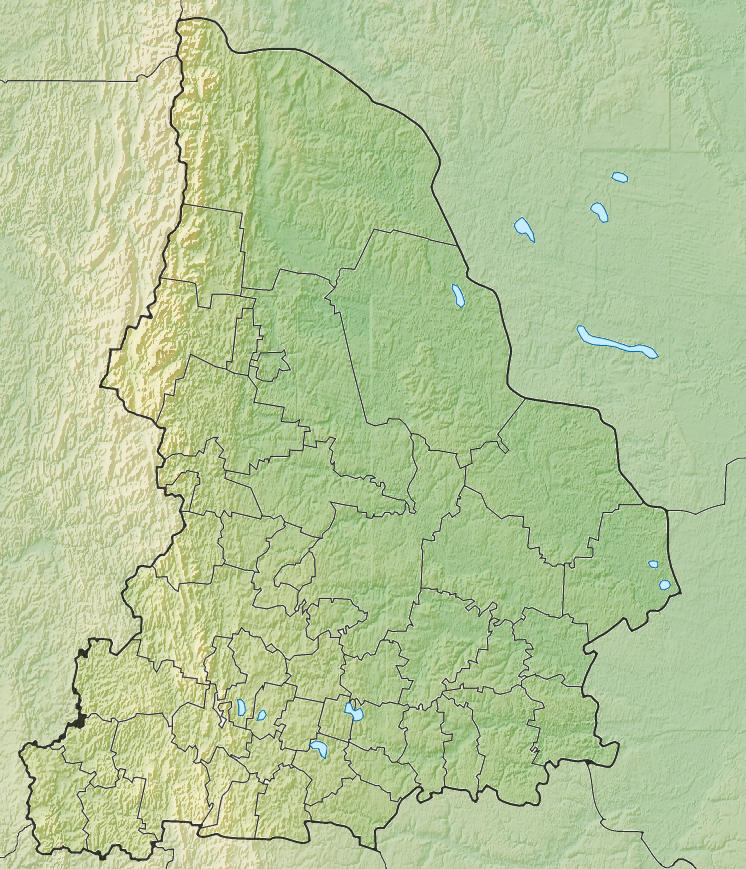
- Location within Sverdlovsk Oblast
- Location: Sverdlovsk Oblast
- Coordinates: 56°59′58″N 60°25′20″E
- Primary outflows: Iset River
- Basin countries: Russia
- Surface area: 24 km^{2} (9.3 sq mi)

Lake Iset (Russian: Исетское озеро) is a sweet water lake in Sverdlovsk Oblast, 25 km north-west from the city of Yekaterinburg, on the shore of the lake stands the city Sredneuralsk. It has an area of about 24 km^{2}.

Into the lake many rivers and streams flow, Shitovskoy source, Big Black, Kalynivka, Beryozovka Lebyazhka and Mulyanka. One follows the Iset River. The lake is surrounded by mountains. Several small islands: Solovetsky reds (because of its shape was formerly called "Cap of Monomakh"), Stone (formerly called "The Ship"). At the lakeshore settlements: Sredneuralsk city, village Iset, villages and Koptyaki Murzinka. Iset lake is rich in fish, including rudd, bream, tench, ruff, perch and pike. Acclimatized species such as carp and mirror carp.

In 1850 in the mouth of the river Iset began construction of an earthen dam. Only in 1946 was replaced by an earthen dam on the concrete. Due to this, the lake level rose to the current level. The lake water is used in Sredneuralskaya GRES.

On the shores of the lake, archaeologists found more than a dozen sites of ancient people, dating from the Neolithic to the Iron Age. On one of the islands was found deposited ocher ancient images, but with the rise of the lake level they were flooded.

== See also ==
- Lake Tavatui
