= Sredneuralskaya GRES =

Power plant in Sredneuralsk, Sverdlovsk, Russia

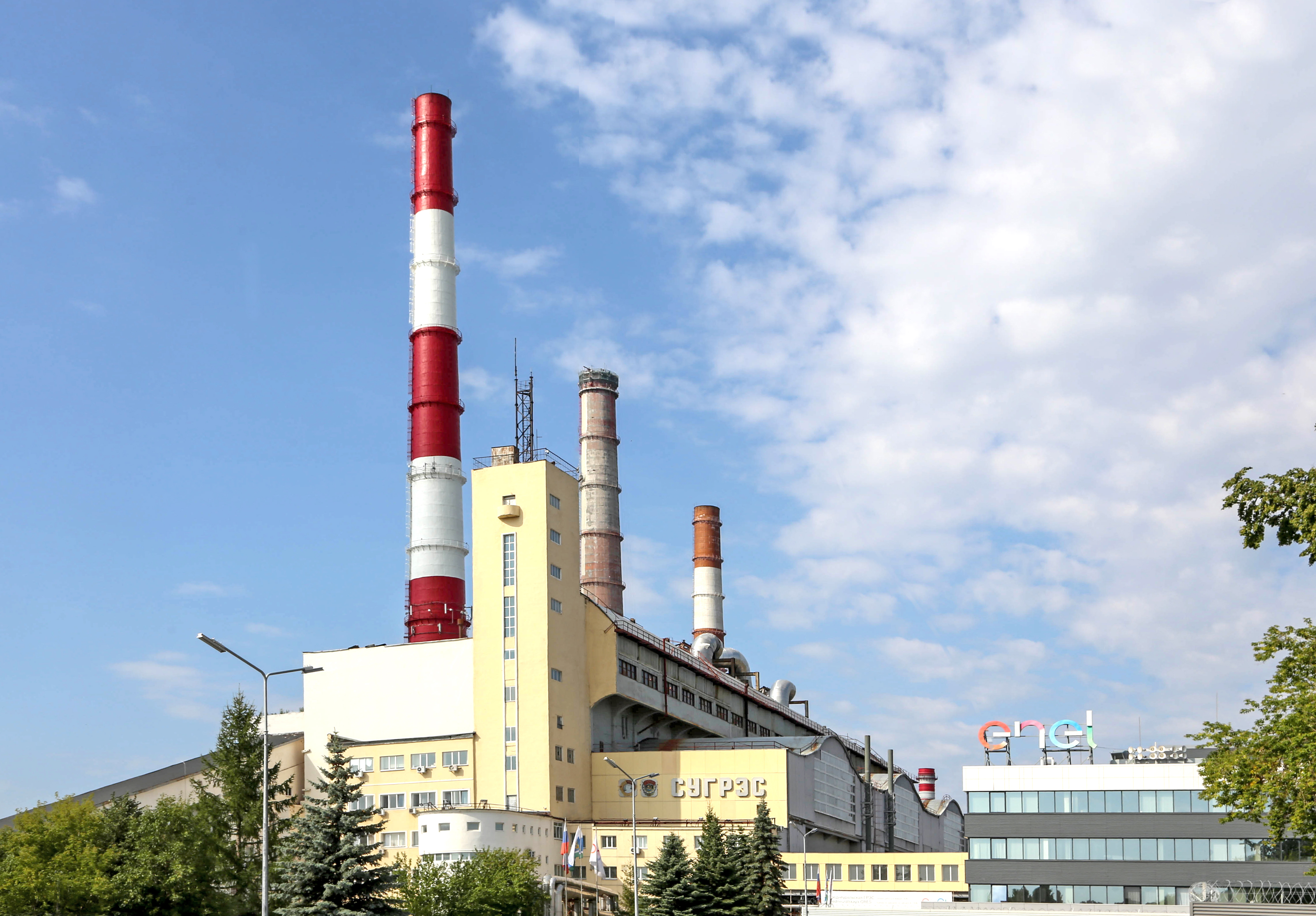
- Country: Russia
- Location: Sredneuralsk, Sverdlovsk Oblast
- Coordinates: 56.9972°N 60.4641°E
- Status: Operational
- Construction began: 1931
- Commission date: 1936
- Owner: Enel Russia

Thermal power station
- Primary fuel: Natural gas
- Secondary fuel: Heavy fuel oil
- Cogeneration?: yes

External links
- Commons: Related media on Commons

Sredneuralskaya GRES is a power plant in Sredneuralsk, Sverdlovsk Oblast, Russia. It is a subsidiary of Enel Russia.

== History ==
Sredneuralskaya GRES is situated by the Iset river. The first mention of the Srenderuralsk state region power plant was in "The plan of national economic construction of USSR". The station is supplied with heat from Yekaterinburg and its satellites. The main fuel is natural gas and the reserve fuel is mazut.

On 31 August 1930, Energocenter decided to build Sredneuralskaya GRES, which had to cover a rural energy deficit. In October 1930, specialists, planners, geodesists, and geologists from Leningrad appeared by Iset Lake, and the station's construction began in 1931. On 6 January 1936, the first turbo-generator was installed with a capacity of 50 MW, Sredneuralskaya GRES became operational. During World War II, the number of workers at Sredneuralskaya GRES decreased by a quarter. Sredneuralskaya GRES supplied energy to multiple factory construction projects in the region, including UralVagonZavod, which produced one-third of all the tanks manufactured in the USSR during the war.

On 1 April 1945, Sredneuralskaya GRES was awarded The Order of Lenin. On 17 April 1945, its power plants were awarded by The Red Standard of State Committee of Defense. By 1949, the building of the first line of GRES, which had eight boilers and five turbo aggregates, was finished.

In 1960, a steam-powered heating complex was installed in Sredneuralskaya GRES, which provided Sverdlovsk, Verhnya Pishma and Sredneuralsk with 1,150 gigacalories of energy and 2,000 tonnes of hot water per hour. To improve the Sverdlovsk heat supply by the end of 1966 the first line of electro station was reconstructed: three turbines were transferred to heat supply.

Because of increasing demands of energy in the regional center, in 1964 Sredneuralskaya GRES began being expanded. In 1967–1970 the third line with 900 MW capacity – three units of 300 MW – was established. It included turbines from the Leningrad Metal Plant and boilers with a capacity of 900 tonnes per hour.

In 1978 the power plant received the rank of "The factory of communist labor".

In 1982 the first line of the power plant switched over from carbon to mazut.

In 1985, the complex to prepare water for replenishing heating systems was introduced to Sredneuralskaya GRES. The water supply arrived through sluices from the Volchihinskoe reservoir.

On 29 April 1986, Sredneuralskaya GRES was awarded by the Order of Labor the Red Banner for high technical and economical work of energy equipment.

Sredneuralskaya GRES won ten social competitions multiple times.

In 1993, an energy unit with a capacity of 300 MW repurposed for heating was reconstructed.

In 2002, a gas turbine expansion station (GTES) with a capacity of 11.5 MW was installed.

In 2011, the first certification audit was carried out at Sredneuralskaya GRES, and it showed that its integrated management system conformed to international standards OHSAS 18001:2007 (Occupational Health and Safety Management Systems) and ISO 14001:2004 (Environmental Management System). Since 2011, external audits regularly carried out at the power plant confirmed efficiency of its internal processes management. In autumn 2017, the audit results confirmed the efficiency and controllability of processes of the integrated management system of occupational health (OHSAS 18001:2007), safety, environment (ISO 14001:2004) and quality (ISO 9001:2008). Quality Management System was certified in 2017 for the first time.

== Stocking ==
Sredneuralskaya GRES' main projects focus on modernising the power plant's units' heating systems. Sredneuralskaya GRES helped stock fish into the Isetskoe reservoir. In 2014, more than two tonnes of precious species of fish were released.

== Fish protection system ==
On 24 August 2017 a special committee accepted a new fish protection device into operation at the Isetkoye water reservoir. The system was installed at all of Sredneuralskaya GRES' water intake channels to prevent fish from being trapped and killed.

== Noise-attenuating device ==
Late in 2017 power unit No.10 was equipped with 10 noise dampers. In 2018 power units No.9 and No.11 were equipped with 12 noise dampers which allow minimising noise from outgoing high pressure steam. The devices are designed to reduce the noise load from steam emissions into the atmosphere during power unit startups and shutdowns. The noise-attenuating devices were built because in the 1930s, when the power plant was designed and built, there were no requirements to territorially separate residential premises and industrial facilities.

== Combined cycle gas turbine ==
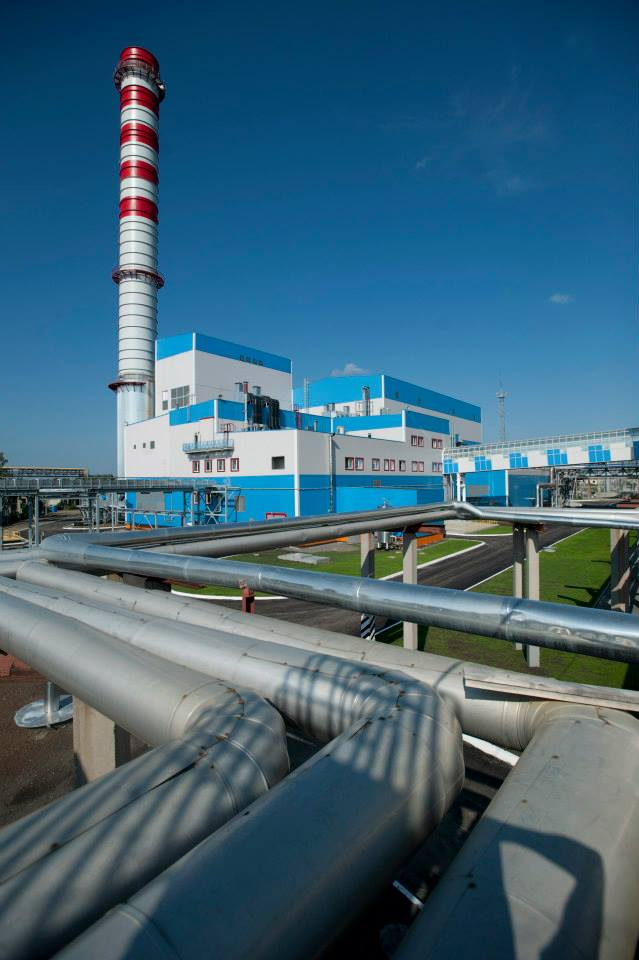
CCGT Sredneuralskaya GRES

In 2011, Enel built a high-efficiency 410 MW combined-cycle gas turbine (CCGT). Since its installation, its operational performance has substantially improved. Compared to 2011, the CCGT's specific fuel consumption has decreased by 10%, while its net electricity production has increased by 4%.

== See also ==
- List of power stations in Russia
