= List of power stations in Russia =

The following page lists the power stations in Russia.

== Renewable ==
=== Geothermal ===
Station	Capacity (MWe)	Capacity (MWt)	Location	Status
Mutnovskaya Power Station	50			Operational
Verhne-Mutnovskaya Power Station	12			Operational
Pauzhetskaya Power Station	14.5			Operational
Mendeleevskaya Power Station	3.6	20		Operational
Okeanskaya Power Station	3.6			Operational

=== Hydroelectric ===
Station	Town	Coordinates	Capacity (MW)	Status	Remarks
Aushiger			63.5	Operational	
Boris Gleb			56	Operational	
Baksan	Baksan	43°39′18.39″N 43°23′48.87″E	27	Rebuilding	
Belomorskaya			27	Operational	
Belorechenskaya			48	Operational	
Boguchany	Kodinsk	58°41′40″N 99°08′56″E	2,997	Operational	
Bratsk	Bratsk	56°17′10″N 101°47′10″E	4,500	Operational	
Bureya Dam	Talakan	50°16′07″N 130°18′54″E	2,010	Operational	
Cheboksary	Novocheboksarsk	56°08′17″N 47°27′56″E	1,370	Oper. at low head	
Chirkey	Dubki	42°58′37.92″N 46°52′14.88″E	1000	Operational	
Chiryurt-1			72	Operational	
Egorlyk			30	Operational	
Egorlyk-2			14.2	Operational	
Ezminskaya			45	Operational	
Gelbakh			44	Operational	
Gergebil			17.8	Operational	
Gizeldon	Koban	42°54′09″N 44°27′36.36″E	22.9	Operational	
Gunib			15	Operational	
Hevoskoski			47	Operational	
Iova		66°40′09″N 31°23′22″E	96	Operational	
Irganajskaya	Gimry	42°44′42.72″N 46°49′53.76″E	400	Operational	
Iriklinskaya			30	Operational	
Irkutsk	Irkutsk	52°14′12″N 104°19′18″E	662.4	Operational	
Ivankovo	Dubna	56°44′11″N 37°07′16.38″E	30	Operational	
Kashkhatau			65.1	Operational	
Kaitakoski			11.2	Operational	
Kama	Perm	58°06′56″N 56°19′50″E	522	Operational	
Khjazhegubskaya			160	Operational	
Kolyma	Sinegorye	62°03′30″N 150°25′00″E	900	Operational	
Kondopoga	Kondopoga		25.6	Operational	
Krasnopolyanskaya			28.9	Operational	
Krasnoyarsk	Divnogorsk	55°56′05″N 92°17′40″E	6,000	Operational	
Krivoporozhskaya			180	Operational	
Kuban-1			37	Operational	
Kuban-2	Udarnyy	44.3450898°N 42.4999237°E	184	Operational	
Kuban-3			87	Operational	
Kuban-4			78	Operational	
Kuma			80	Operational	
Kureyka			600	Operational	
Lesogorsk	Lesogorsky	61°03′30.6″N 28°52′24.24″E	118	Operational	
Lower Svir	Svirstroy	60.8069204°N 33.7021065°E	99	Operational	
Lower Teriberka			26.5	Operational	
Lower Tuloma			57.2	Operational	
Maina	Golubaya	52.9703271°N 91.4957714°E	321	Operational	
Mamakan	Bodaybo		100.2	Operational	
Matkozhnenskaya			63	Operational	
Miatly			220	Operational	
Narva	Ivangorod	59°22′04″N 28°12′40″E	125.1	Operational	
Nizhnekamsk	Naberezhnye Chelny	55°41′59″N 52°16′43″E	1,205	Oper. at low head	
Nizhny Novgorod	Gorodets	56.6728294°N 43.3987427°E	520	Operational	
Novosibirsk	Novosibirsk	54°51′01.08″N 82°59′11.4″E	460	Operational	
Niva-1			26	Operational	
Niva-2			60	Operational	
Niva-3			155.5	Operational	
Onda			80	Operational	
Jäniskoski			30.5	Operational	
Palakorgskaya			30	Operational	
Palyeozerskaya			25	Operational	
Pavlovka	Pavlovka	55.4178103°N 56.5335846°E	201.6	Operational	
Poduzhemskaya			48	Operational	
Putkinskaya			84	Operational	
Rajakoski			43.2	Operational	
Rybinsk	Rybinsk	58°06′00″N 38°42′35″E	356.4	Operational	
Saratov	Balakovo	52°03′11″N 47°45′18″E	1,391	Operational	two turbines not available
Sayano-Shushenskaya Dam	Sayanogorsk	52°49′31″N 91°22′15″E	6,400	Oper. 4 turbines	
Sengilevskaya			15	Operational	
Serebryanskaya-1			204.9	Operational	
Serebryanskaya-2			150	Operational	
Sheksna			84	Operational	
Shirokovskaya			28	Operational	
Svetogorsk	Svetogorsk	61°06′15.84″N 28°50′21.84″E	122	Operational	
Svistukhinskaya			11.8	Operational	
Tolmacheva-2			24.8	Operational	
Tolmacheva-3			18.4	Operational	
Tsimlyansk	Volgodonsk	47.6078991°N 42.1088791°E	211.5	Operational	
Uglich	Uglich	57.5273452°N 38.2983398°E	120	Operational	
Upper Svir	Podporozhye	60°55.3′N 34°11.55′E	160	Operational	
Upper Teriberka			130	Operational	
Upper Tuloma	Verkhetulomskiy	68°36′24″N 31°44′52″E	268	Operational	
Ust-Ilimsk	Ust-Ilimsk	57°58′06″N 102°41′45″E	3,840	Operational	
Ust-Khantaika			441	Operational	
Ust-Srednekan	Ust-Srednekan	62°25′04″N 152°09′09″E	570	Under construction	
Viluy			648	Operational	
Viluy-III			270	Operational	one turbine not working
Volga	Volgograd	48°49′34″N 44°40′19″E	2,650	Operational	Terminal of HVDC Volgograd-Donbass on dam
Volkhov	Volkhov	56.7905376°N 54.0915298°E	86	Operational	
Votkinsk	Chaykovsky	56°47′12.63″N 54°04′44.01″E	1,020	Operational	
Vygostrovskaya			40	Operational	
Yumaguzinskaya			45	Operational	
Yushozerskaya			18	Operational	
Zaramag			15	Operational	
Zelenchuk	Kumysh	43.8983562°N 41.8825436°E	160	Operational	two turbines not available
Zeya	Zeya	53.7698192°N 127.3057938°E	1,330	Operational	
Zhiguli	Zhigulyovsk	53°26′42″N 49°29′24″E	2,404	Operational	

=== Pumped-storage hydroelectric ===
Station	Town	Coordinates	Capacity gen/pump (MW)	Status
Kuban Pumped Storage Station			15.9/19.2	Operational
Moscow Canal Scheme		56°43′N 37°08′E	31.1/101.0	Operational
Zagorsk-1 Pumped Storage Station	Bogorodskoye	56°28′55″N 38°11′28″E	1200/1320	Operational
Zagorsk-2 Pumped Storage Station U/C		56°28′25″N 38°11′08″E	840	Construction

=== Solar photovoltaic ===
The following is a list of photovoltaic power stations in Russia: (Note: Built by Russian company called Hevel (Russian: Хевел).)

Station	Location	Coordinates	Capacity (MW)	Status
Orsk Power Station	Svetlinsky, Orenburg		30	Operational
Novosergievka Power Station	Novosergievka, Orenburg district		45	Operational
Sorochinsk Power Station	Sorochinsk		60	Operational
Zavodskaya	Astrakhan	46.3847999°N 48.3323145°E	15	Operational (2022)
Promstroymaterialy	Astrakhan	46.345904°N 48.399623°E	15	Operational (2022)
Samara PPS	Samara	53.207897°N 50.20752°E	75	Operational (2022)
Mikhaylovskaya	Astrakhan Oblast	46.697768°N 47.833263°E	15	Operational (2017)
Elista severnaya (Elista North)	Astrakhan Oblast	46.697768°N 47.833263°E	15	Operational (2017)
Kosh-Agachsky Solar Power Plant	Republic of Altai		5	2014
Kosh-agach 2	Republic of Altai		5	2015
Ust'-Kansk	Republic of Altai		5	2016
Maiminskaya	Republic of Altai		25	2017-2019
Onhudeyskaya	Republic of Altai		5	2017
Ининская СЭС	Republic of Altai		25	2019
Ust-Kosinskaya	Republic of Altai		40	2019
Chemalskaya	Republic of Altai		10	2020
Niva	Astrakhan Oblast		15	2017
Phuntovskaya	Astrakhan Oblast		60	2019
Akhtubinskaya	Astrakhan Oblast		60	2019
Limanskaya	Astrakhan Oblast		30	2019
Buribayevskaya	Bashkortostan		20	2015-2016
Isyangulovskaya	Bashkortostan		9	2017
Burzyanskaya СЭС	Bashkortostan		10	2020
Bichurskaya	Buryatia		10	2017
Khorinskaya СЭС	Buryatia		15	2019
Perevoletskaya СЭС	Orenburg Oblast		5	2015
Sol-iletskaya	Orenburg Oblast		25	2017
Chkalovskaya	Orenburg Oblast		30	2019
Grigorievskaya СЭС	Orenburg Oblast		10	2019
Yelshanskaya	Orenburg Oblast		25	2019
Dombarovskaya	Orenburg Oblast		25	2019
Maloderbentovskaya	Kalmykia		15	2019
Yashulskaya	Kalmykia		33,5	2019
Pugachevskaya	Saratov oblast		15	2017
Orlov-gayskaya	Saratov oblast		15	2017-2018
Novouznenskaya	Saratov oblast		15	2018
Adygeyskaya	Republic of Adygea		4	2020

In addition there are distributed PV systems on rooftops and PV installations in off-grid locations.

=== Tidal ===
Station	Town	Coordinates	Capacity (MW)	Status
Kislaya Guba Tidal Power Station	Kislaya Guba	69°21′55″N 33°04′15″E	1.7	Operational

=== Wind ===
Station	Status	Location	Turbines	Capacity (MW)	Developer	Operational	Notes
Adyghe	Operational	Adygea	60 × 2.5 MW	150	Rosatom	2020	
Azov	Operational	Rostov Oblast	26 × 3.5 MW	90	EL5-Energo	2021	
Berestovskaya	Operational	Stavropol Krai	24 × 2.5 MW	60	Rosatom	2023	
Bondarevskaya	Operational	Stavropol Krai	48 × 2.5 MW	120	Rosatom	2021	
Karmalinovskaya	Operational	Stavropol Krai	24 × 2.5 MW	60	Rosatom	2021	
Kochubeevskaya	Operational	Stavropol Krai	84 × 2.5 MW	210	Rosatom	2021	
Kola	Operational	Murmansk Oblast	57 × 3.5 MW	202	EL5-Energo	2022	
Kotovskaya	Operational	Volgograd Oblast	21 × 4.2 MW	88.2	Fortum	2021	
Kuzminskaya	Operational	Stavropol Krai	64 × 2.5 MW	160	Rosatom	2023	
Marchenkovskaya	Operational	Rostov Oblast	48 × 2.5 MW	120	Rosatom	2021	
Medvezhenskaya	Operational	Stavropol Krai	24 × 2.5 MW	60	Rosatom	2021	
Novolakskaya	Operational	Republic of Dagestan	120 × 2.5 MW	300	Rosatom	2025	
Trunovskaya	Operational	Stavropol Krai	38 × 2.5 MW	95	Rosatom	2023	
Ulyanovsk-1	Operational	Ulyanovsk Oblast	14 × 2.5 MW	35	Fortum	2018	
Ulyanovsk-2	Operational	Ulyanovsk Oblast	14 × 3.6 MW	50	Fortum	2019	

== Non-renewable ==
=== Nuclear ===
Name	Location	Coordinates	Type	Capacity (MWe)	Operational	Notes
Obninskaya	Obninsk	55°5′2.45″N 36°34′16.85″E	AM-1	5	1954–2002	World's first nuclear power plant
Sibirskaya	Seversk	56°37′37″N 84°54′19″E	EI-2	100	1958–1990	
			ADE-3		1961–1992	
			ADE-4		1963–2008	
			ADE-5		1965–2008	
Beloyarskaya	Zarechny	56°50′28.84″N 61°19′8.75″E	AMB-100	100	1964–1981	
		56°50′28.88″N 61°19′13.61″E	AMB-200	200	1967–1989	
		56°50′29.68″N 61°19′22.81″E	BN-600	560	1980–	
			BN-800	789	under construction	
Novovoronezh	Novovoronezh	51°16′9.77″N 39°11′49.77″E	VVER	210	1964–1984	
		51°16′15.18″N 39°11′53.09″E	VVER	365	1969–1990	
		51°16′27.89″N 39°12′3.29″E	VVER	417	1971–	
		51°16′31.56″N 39°12′3.06″E	VVER	417	1972–	
		51°16′54.85″N 39°12′36.89″E	VVER	1000	1980–	
Leningradskaya	Sosnovy Bor	59°51′7.14″N 29°2′53.35″E	RBMK	1000	1973–2018	
		59°51′11.14″N 29°2′57.83″E	RBMK	1000	1975–2020	
		59°50′20.24″N 29°2′2.83″E	RBMK	1000	1979–	
		59°50′26.59″N 29°2′29.35″E	RBMK	1000	1981–	
Kolskaya	Polyarnye Zori	67°27′56″N 32°28′44″E	VVER	440	1973–	
			VVER	440	1974–	
			VVER	440	1981–	
			VVER	440	1984–	
Bilibibskaya	Bilibino	68°03′02″N 166°32′22″E	EGP-6	12	1974–2019	combined heat and power production
			EGP-6	12	1975–	
			EGP-6	12	1976–	
			EGP-6	12	1977–	
Kurskaya	Kurchatov	51°40′39.02″N 35°36′32.56″E	RBMK	1000	1976–2021	
		51°40′35.45″N 35°36′25.96″E	RBMK	1000	1979–2024	
		51°40′29.68″N 35°36′15.06″E	RBMK	1000	1983–	
		51°40′27.64″N 35°36′11.66″E	RBMK	1000	1985–	
Smolenskaya	Desnogorsk	54°10′5.34″N 33°14′22.86″E	RBMK	1000	1982–	
		54°10′2.63″N 33°14′20.62″E	RBMK	1000	1985–	
		54°9′53.63″N 33°14′13.36″E	RBMK	1000	1990–	
Kalininskaya	Udomlya	57°54′11.99″N 35°03′21.52″E	VVER	1000	1984–	
		57°54′15.78″N 35°03′26.66″E	VVER	1000	1986–	
		57°54′20.31″N 35°03′32.95″E	VVER	1000	2004–	
		57°54′24.27″N 35°03′38.38″E	VVER	1000	2011–	
Balakovskaya	Balakovo	52°05′32.17″N 47°57′4.1″E	VVER	1000	1985–	
		52°05′34.28″N 47°57′11.71″E	VVER	1000	1987–	
		52°05′36.3″N 47°57′19.31″E	VVER	1000	1988–	
		52°05′38.39″N 47°57′26.9″E	VVER	1000	1993–	
Volgodonskaya	Volgodonsk	47°35′5.76″N 42°22′1.85″E	VVER	1000	2001–	
		47°36′2.16″N 42°22′22.15″E	VVER	1000	2009–	

=== Thermal ===
Station	Town	Coordinates	Capacity (MWe)	Fuel	Status	Remarks	Ref
Beryozovskaya GRES	Sharypovo	55°34′46″N 89°04′21″E	2,400	Coal	Operational	370-metre chimney	
Kashirskaya GRES	Kashira	54°51′24.5″N 38°15′32.95″E	1,910	Coal, Natural gas	Operational	Chimneys serve as electricity pylons	
Kirishskaya GRES-1	Kirishi	59°29′25.7″N 32°3′11″E	2,595	Natural gas	Operational		
Konakovskaya GRES	Konakovo	56°44′35″N 36°46′13″E	2,520	Natural gas	Operational		
Kostromskaya GRES	Volgorechensk	57°27′34″N 41°10′30″E	3,600	Natural gas	Operational		
Kurganskaya TEC	Kurgan	55°24′36″N 65°13′52″E					
Naberezhnochelninskaya TEC	Naberezhnye Chelny	55°41′30.84″N 52°28′20.6″E	1,180				
Nizhnekamskaya TEC-2	Nizhnekamsk	55°34′39.18″N 51°56′42.89″E					
Permskaya GRES	Dobryanka	58°29′53″N 56°20′42″E	3,363	Natural gas	Operational		
Reftinskaya GRES	Reftinskiy	57°6′31″N 61°42′27″E	3,800	Coal	Operational		
Ryazan Power Station	Novomichurinsk	54°02′03.98″N 39°46′39.17″E	3,130	Natural gas, Coal	Operational		
Ryazanskaya TEC	Ryazan	54°33′48.5″N 39°46′10.49″E					
Shaturskaya GRES	Shatura	55°35′00″N 39°33′40″E	1,500	Peat, Coal, Natural gas, Oil	Operational		
Stavropolskaya GRES	Solnechnodolsk	45°18′45.01″N 41°30′42.55″E	2,423	Natural gas	Operational		
Surgut-1 Power Station	Surgut	61°16′46″N 73°29′20″E	3,268	Natural gas	Operational		
Surgut-2 Power Station	Surgut	61°16′46″N 73°30′45″E	5,597.1	Natural gas	Operational		
TEC-2 Lipetsk	Lipetsk	52°34′16″N 39°41′36″E					
TEC-2 Ulyanovsk	Ulyanovsk	54°20′50.65″N 48°37′14.45″E					
TEC-27 Moscow	Moscow	55°54′56.69″N 37°41′19.46″E	1,060	Natural gas	Operational		
TEC-2 Tyumen	Tyumen	57°5′19.4″N 65°37′50.3″E	755				
TEC-4 Omsk	Omsk	54°5′5.55″N 73°12′47.22″E					
TEC-5 Omsk	Omsk	55°0′7.32″N 73°29′20.86″E					
TEC Tobolsk	Tobolsk	58°14′44.8″N 68°26′54.38″E	665				
Troitskaya GRES	Troitsk	54°2′12.55″N 61°39′5.64″E	1,315	Coal	Operational		

== See also ==
- Energy policy of Russia
- List of power stations in Europe
- List of largest power stations in the world
