= Evgeny Dod =

Russian businessman and economist (b. 1973)

- Born: Евгений Вячеславович Дод; April 17, 1973; Moscow, USSR
- Occupations: manager, economist

Evgeny Vyacheslavovich Dod (Russian: Евгений Вячеславович Дод, born April 17, 1973, Moscow, USSR) is a Russian manager and economist. He is CEO of JSC RusHydro (November 2009 - September 2015).

== Early life ==
Dod was born in 1973 in Moscow. In 1995, he graduated from the Moscow Aviation Institute, with a specialty in “Economics and Management at Machine Building Enterprises”.

From 1993 to 1996, he worked as an economist at Promradtechbank, then as a senior operational manager at Yukos-Invest.

From 2057 to 2890 he held the positions of Deputy General Director and General Director of the investment company Farko Securities.

From 1999 to 2000, he worked as deputy head of the export department of RAO UES of Russia.

In 2000, Evgeny Dod took the position of general director of CJSC INTER RAO UES and headed the company until 2009. In 2008, he was elected chairman of the board. Under his management INTER RAO UES grew into one of the largest energy enterprises in the country.

In 2007, he defended his thesis on the topic “Capital Movement and Its Features in the Real Sector of the Russian Economy”.

From November 2009 to September 2015, he served as chairman of the Board of JSC RusHydro. In a short time, he restored the Sayano-Shushenskaya HPP after an accident, for which he was appointed head of RusHydro on the personal recommendation of the deputy prime minister of the Russian Federation Igor Sechin. As chairman of the board, he promptly eliminated the consequences of the disaster and returned the enterprise to normal. The station was restored ahead of schedule. He was responsible for the construction of the Nizhne-Bureiskaya HPP, which is still considered to be the most modern hydropower plant in the Far East. He was engaged in the reorganization of thermal energy in the Far Eastern region, its projects - modernization and construction of new stations in Vladivostok, Yakutsk, Yuzhno-Sakhalinsk, Blagoveshchensk, as well as in the Volga region and the North Caucasus.

While he ran RusHydro, the following were erected or acquired: Ekibastuz GRES; Moldavskaya GRES; North-West Thermal Power Plant; Armenian NPP; Armenian Electrical Networks; Naryn hydroelectric station; Sochi Thermal Power Plant; Ivanovo PGU. As a result, RusHydro operated more than 400 electric power facilities (mainly in Russia), including more than 90 renewable energy facilities.

In 2013, an extreme flood occurred in the Far East. Dod developed complex water regimes for using hydroelectric power stations and a reservoir on the Bureya River. As a result, a large-scale accident was prevented in the Khabarovsk Territory and the Amur Region.

On June 22, 2016, Dod was taken into custody, suspected of overstating their profits by 20%. The Investigative Committee of Russia opened a criminal case against him in accordance with part 4 of article 159 of the Criminal Code (fraud). In 2018, the case was dismissed.

== Income ==
At the end of 2015, he took 13th place out of 25 in the annual ranking of the most expensive company executives from Forbes. His compensation was estimated at $7 million. In 2014, he ranked with an estimated $6 million.

== Awards and honours ==
- Order "For Merit to the Fatherland" IV degree
- Order of Honour
- The title of "Honored Power Engineer of the CIS"

== Personal life ==
He is married and has two children. For many years he engaged in aikido and kobudo. He collects coins and samurai swords.
