= Nevinnomysskaya GRES =

Power station in Nevinnomyssk, Stavropol Krai, Russia

Nevinnomysskaya Power Station Nevinnomysskaya GRES
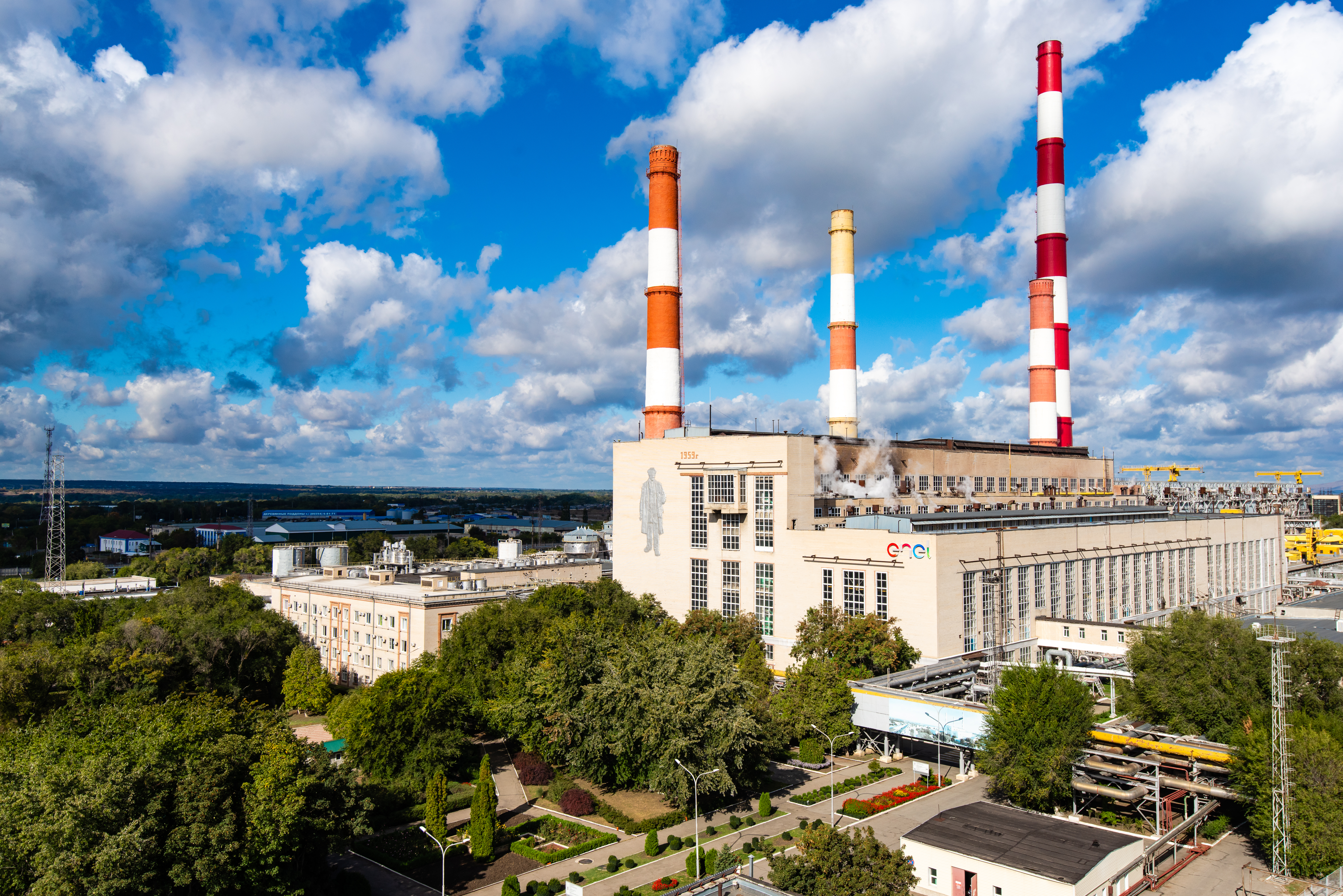
- Country: Russia
- Location: Nevinnomyssk, Stavropol krai
- Coordinates: 44.6595°N 41.9302°E
- Status: Operational
- Commission date: 1960
- Owner: Enel Russia

Thermal power station
- Primary fuel: Natural gas
- Secondary fuel: Heavy fuel oil
- Cogeneration?: yes

Power generation
- Nameplate capacity: 1530.2 MW

External links
- Commons: Related media on Commons

Nevinnomysskaya GRES is a power plant of federal importance located in Nevinnomyssk, Stavropol krai, Northern Caucasus federal area. It is a subsidiary of Enel Russia.

== History ==
Construction of CHP plant as part of Nevinnomyssk Nitrogen-fertilizer plant was started in 1958, the first turbine unit was commissioned in June,1960. General designer of the plant is Rostov department of the design institute "Teploenergoprojekt". The general contractor for construction is "Kavkazenergomontazh". In August 1960, Nevinnomysskaya CHP plant demerged from the plant, and in 1962 it was renamed as Nevinnomysskaya GRES. In 1970, the Unit No. 6 was put into operation, in 1972, the CCGT-170 was commissioned, it was decommissioned only in April 2015. In 1981–1997, activities to increase GRES heat capacity were carried out, in 1997–2007, GRES was technically refurbished and reconstructed.

== Technical description ==
The installed electric capacity of Nevinnomysskaya GRES is 1530.2 MW. Installed heat capacity is 585 Gcal/hour. The power plant has 13 turbines and 14 boilers. Nevinnomysskaya GRES consists of CHP plant, outdoor condensing units, CCGT-170 and new CCGT-410. Process water for the power plant is supplied from Bolshoi Stavropol channel and Kuban river. The main fuel is natural gas, the reserve fuel is heavy fuel oil (mazut).

GRES is divided into Boiler and Turbine shop −1, Boiler and Turbine shop – 2 and CCGT-410.

The main equipment of Boiler and Turbine shop – 1 (CHP plant) was put into operation in 2 stages.

The main equipment of 90 bar stage (DH units No. 1 and 2) includes 4 boilers TP-15 produced by Taganrog Boiler Plant with nominal capacity 220 tons of steam per hour and 2 DH turbines PT-25-90/10 produced by JSC "Turbomotor Plant" (Yekaterinburg) with installed electric capacity of 25 MW and heat capacity of 97 Gcal/h. The main equipment of the 130 bar stage (DH units No.3, 4, 5) includes:

The main equipment of the 130 bar stage (DH units No.3, 4, 5) includes:

- 3 boilers TGM-96 produced by Taganrog Boiler Plant with a nominal capacity of 480 tons per hour;
- DH turbine PT-80/100-130/13 produced by Leningrad Metal Plant with installed electric capacity of 80 MW and heat capacity of 183 Gcal/h;
- DH turbine R-50-130-21 produced by Leningrad Metal Plant with an installed electric capacity 50 MW and a heat capacity of 188 Gcal/h;
- DH turbine R-30-130/15 produced by JSC “Turbomotor Plant” (Yekaterinburg) with electric capacity of 30 MW and heat capacity of 164 Gcal/h.

The main equipment of Boiler and Turbine Shop-2 is represented by 6 units (No. 6-11). Each unit consists of:

- boiler TGM-94 produced by Taganrog Boiler Plant with nominal capacity of 500 tons of steam per hour;
- steam turbine K-150-130 (units No. 6-10) with an installed electric capacity of 150 MW or steam turbine K-160-130 (No. 11) with installed electrical capacity of 160 MW produced by Kharkiv Turbine Plant.

CCGT-170 includes the following principal equipment:

- Two-body high pressure steam generator VPG-450-140 produced by Taganrog Boiler Plant with steam capacity of 450 t/hour;
- Steam turbine K-145-130 (No. 12) produced by Kharkov Turbine Plant with installed electric capacity of 145 MW;
- Gas turbine plant with gas turbine GT-25-710 (No. 13) produced by Kharkov Turbine Plant with installed electric capacity of 25 MW.

== The start-up of new CCGT ==
On 15 July 2011, a new 410 MW CCGT (CCGT-410) was started up at Nevinnomysskaya GRES. This is the first new unit that Enel has commissioned in Russia as part of an investment program aimed at increasing installed capacity, improving production and environmental parameters of the company's power plants. CCGT-410 of Nevinnomysskaya GRES is the only project of this type and scale implemented in the region. Introduction of new generating capacity allowed for a more reliable, uninterrupted power supply to the region during the XXII Winter Olympic Games and the XI Paralympic Games in Sochi. The new unit features increased reliability and a high degree of automation of technological processes. The new CCGT efficiency is about 58% compared to 35 -40% of traditional Gas turbine plants.

== Interesting facts ==
- In 2014, Nevinnomysskaya GRES set two records for power generation. On 30 November, following the System Operator's Order, the power plant produced 37 million 732 thousand kWh., which is the maximum daily production in the history of Nevinnomysskaya GRES. In August 2014, Nevinnomysskaya GRES produced a record amount of electricity per day in summer – 32 million 154 thousand kWh.
- 1 April 2015 marks a milestone in the history of Nevinnomysskaya GRES – CCGT-170 decommissioning.
- During its 42 years of operation, the CCGT-170 generated 33 billion 519 million 942 thousand kWh.

== Images ==
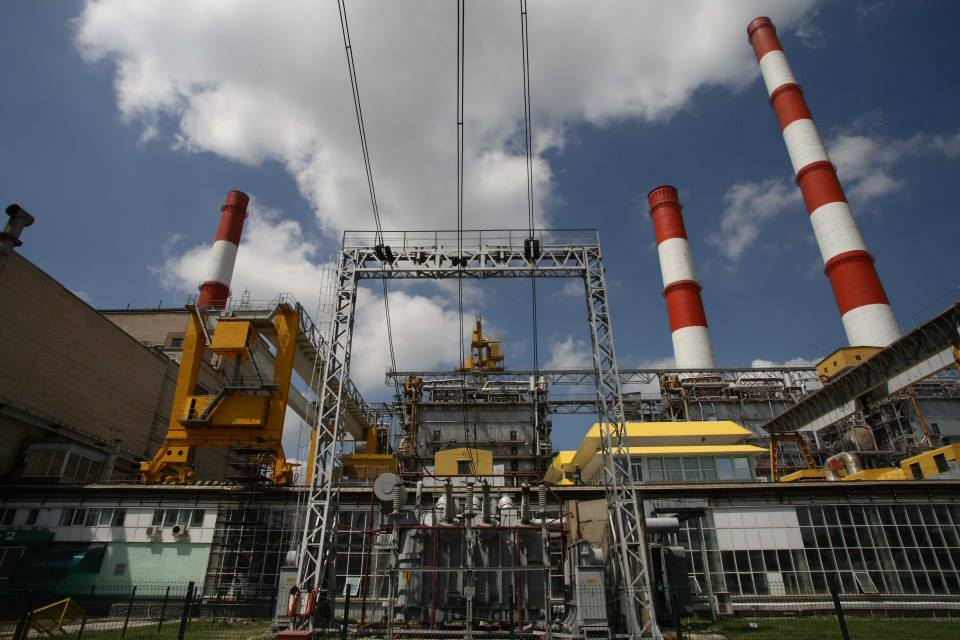

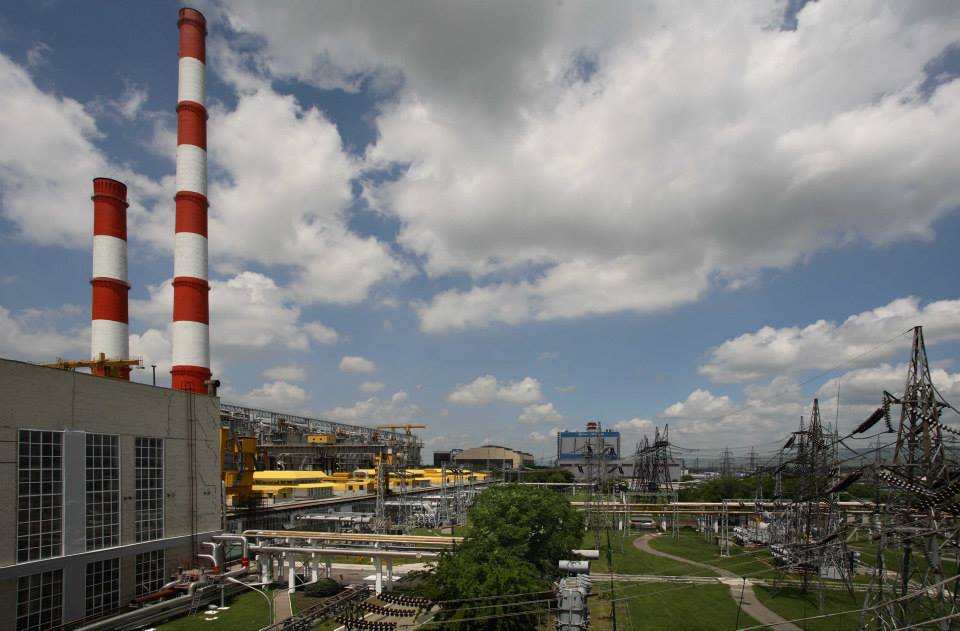

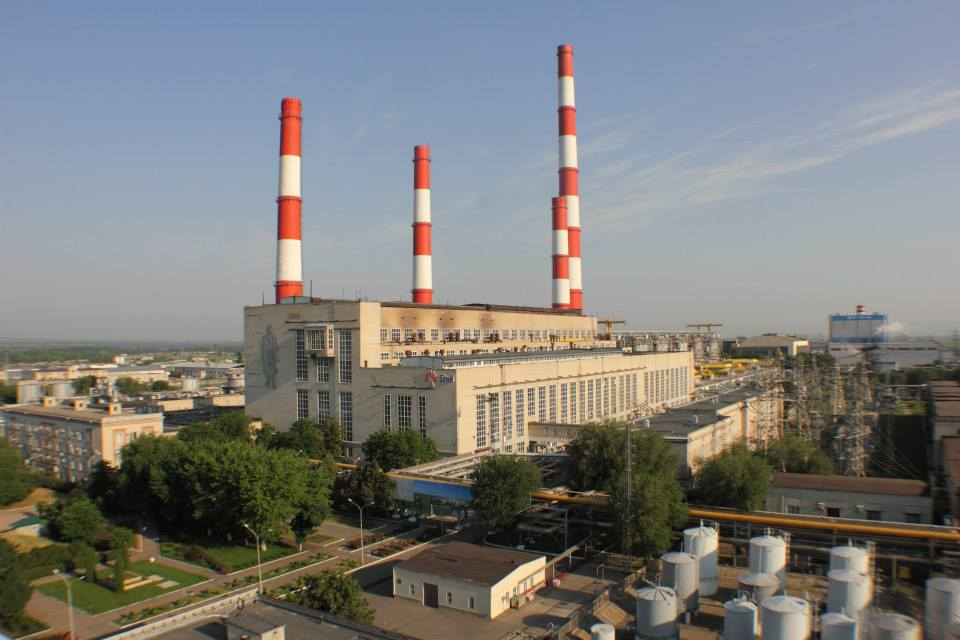
