= Izhevsk-2 Power Plant =

Coal-fired power plant in Izhevsk, Udmurtia, Russia

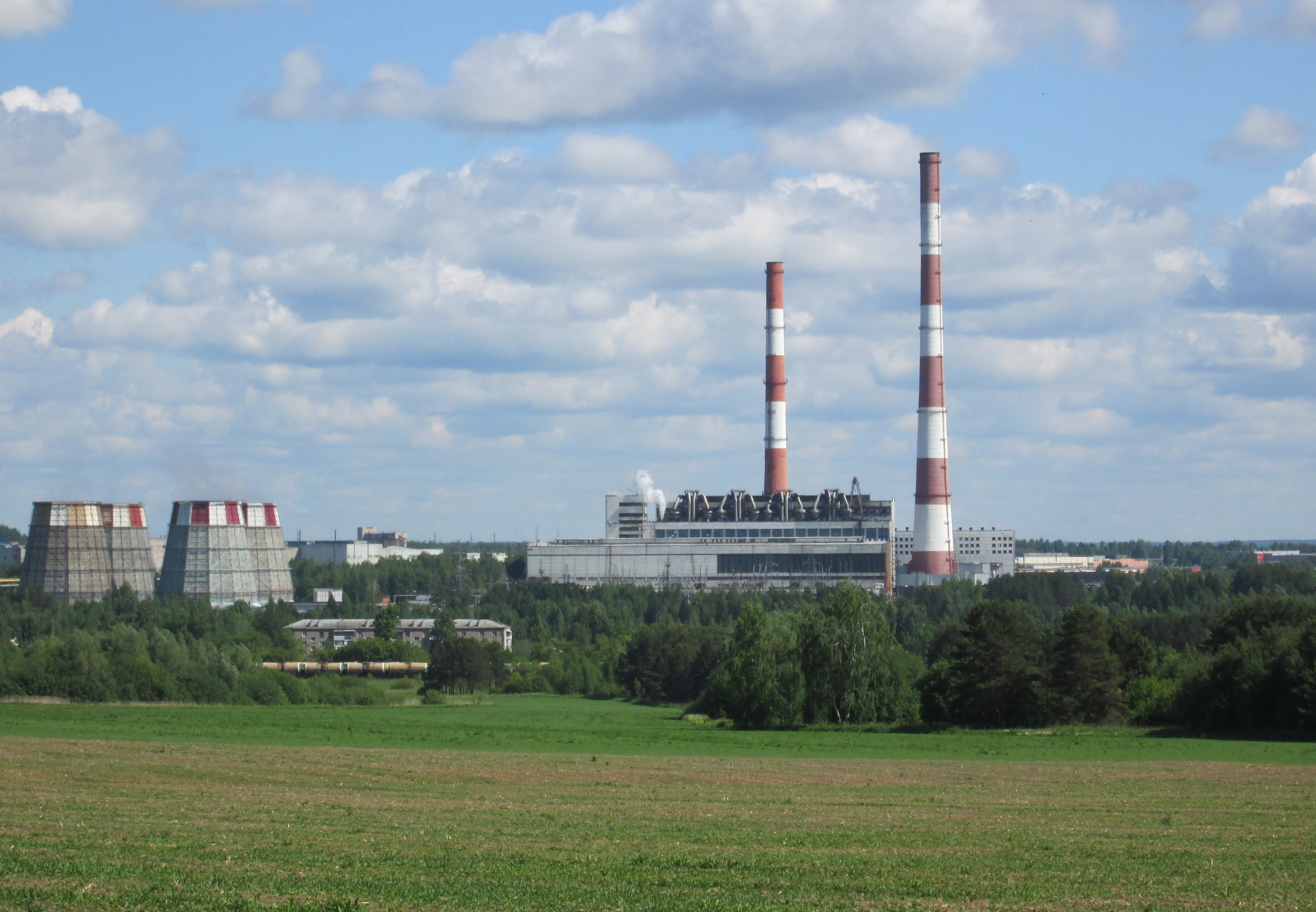
- Official name: Ижевская ТЭЦ-2
- Country: Russia
- Location: Izhevsk, Udmurtia
- Coordinates: 56°53′35.2″N 53°20′22.2″E
- Status: Operational
- Commission date: January 1977
- Owner: T Plus Group

Thermal power station
- Primary fuel: Natural gas

Power generation
- Units operational: 1 X 60 MW, 3 X 110 MW
- Nameplate capacity: 390 MW

External links
- Commons: Related media on Commons

The Izhevsk-2 Power Plant (Russian: Ижевская ТЭЦ-2) is a gas-fired power station in Izhevsk, Udmurt Republic, Russia.

== History ==
The power plant was commissioned in January 1977.

== Technical specifications ==
The power plant has a total generation capacity of 390 MW. It consists of one 60 MW generation unit and three 110 MW generation units. It is owned by T Plus Group.

== See also ==
- List of power stations in Russia
