= Zagorsk Pumped Storage Station =

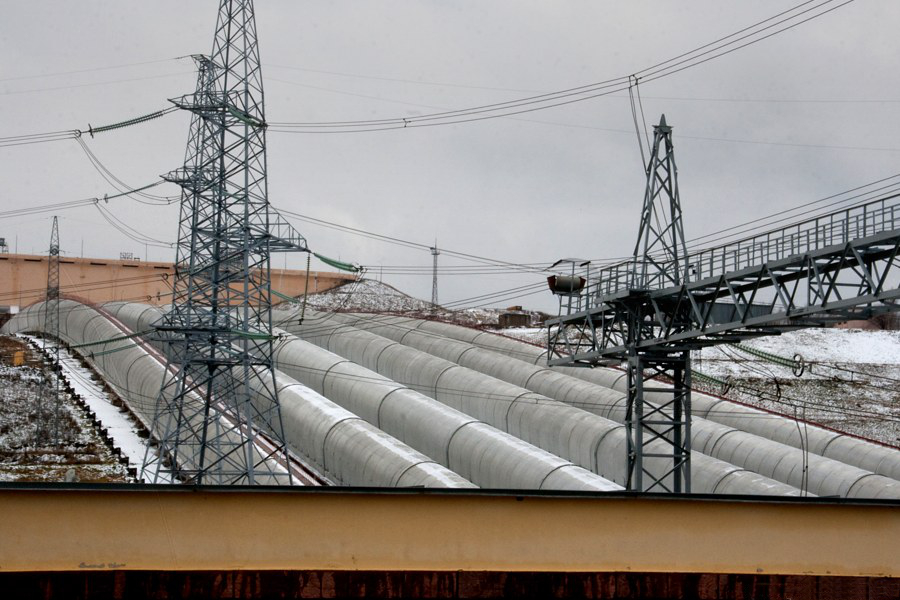
- Official name: Zagorskaya PSP
- Coordinates: 56°28′54″N 38°11′28″E
- Opening date: 1987–2000
- Owner(s): RusHydro

Power Station
- Pump-generators: 6 x 200 MW (270,000 hp)
- Installed capacity: 1,200 MW (1,600,000 hp)
- Annual generation: 1.9 billion kWh

Zagorsk Pumped Storage Station (Russian: Заго́рская гидроаккумули́рующая электроста́нция) is a pumped-storage hydroelectric power station near Sergiev Posad, Russia. Zagorsk-1 has a 1,200 megawatts (1,600,000 hp) installed capacity and was Russia's first power plant of that type. The project was approved in 1974, the first two generators operational in 1987 and the rest by 2000. Zagorsk-2 with a future installed capacity of 840 MW is currently being constructed adjacent to it.

== See also ==
- List of power stations in Russia
