= Ust-Koksa Solar Power Plant =

Photovoltaic power plant in Altai, Russia

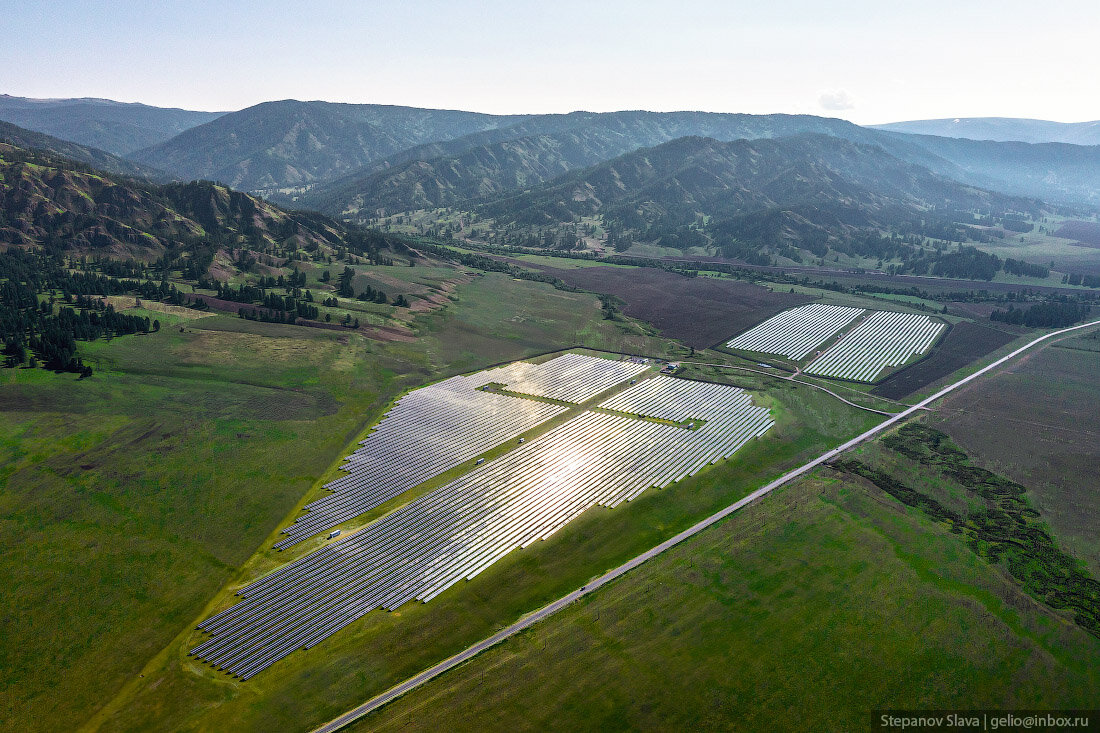
- Country: Russia
- Location: Altai
- Coordinates: 50°25′22.1″N 85°09′15.3″E
- Status: Operational
- Commission date: December 2019

Power generation
- Nameplate capacity: 40 MW

External links
- Commons: Related media on Commons

The Ust-Koksa Solar Power Plant is a photovoltaic power plant in Altai Republic, Russia.

== History ==
The power plant was commissioned in December 2019.

== Technical specifications ==
The power plant is ground mounted and has an installed capacity of 40 MW.

== See also ==
- List of power stations in Russia
