= Kosh-Agachsky Solar Power Plant =

Photovoltaic power plant in Altai, Russia

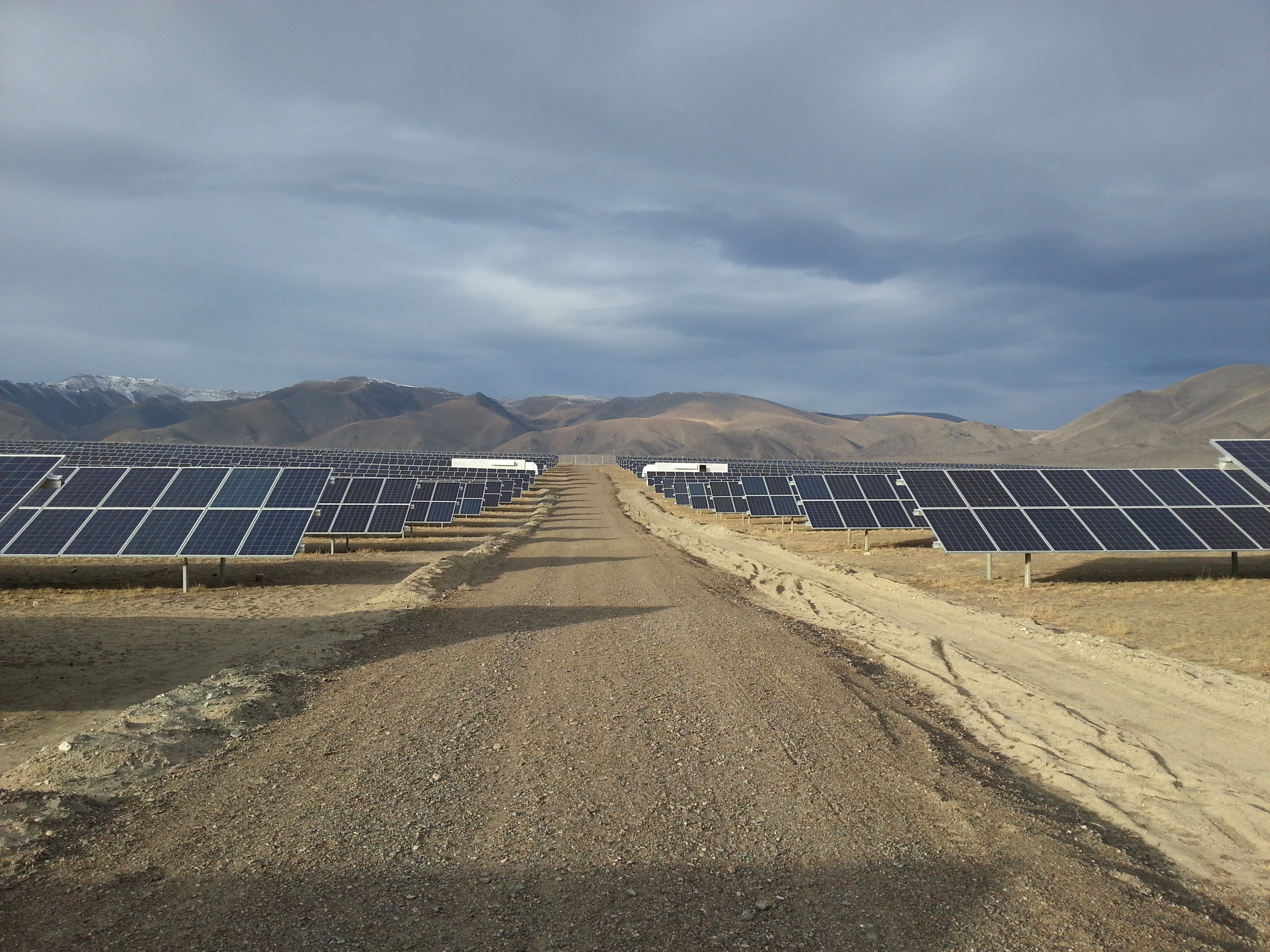
- Official name: Кош-Агачская солнечная электростанция
- Country: Russia
- Location: Altai
- Coordinates: 50°01′15.0″N 88°41′43.0″E
- Status: Operational
- Commission date: 4 September 2014
- Construction cost: RUB570 million

Power generation
- Nameplate capacity: 5 MW

External links
- Commons: Related media on Commons

The Kosh-Agachsky Solar Power Plant (Russian: Кош-Агачская солнечная электростанция) is a photovoltaic power plant in Altai Republic, Russia.

== History ==
The power plant was launch on 4 September 2014 in a ceremony attended by President Vladimir Putin.

== Finance ==
The power plant was constructed with a cost of RUB570 million.

== See also ==
- List of power stations in Russia
