= Lake Tavatui =

Lake in Russia

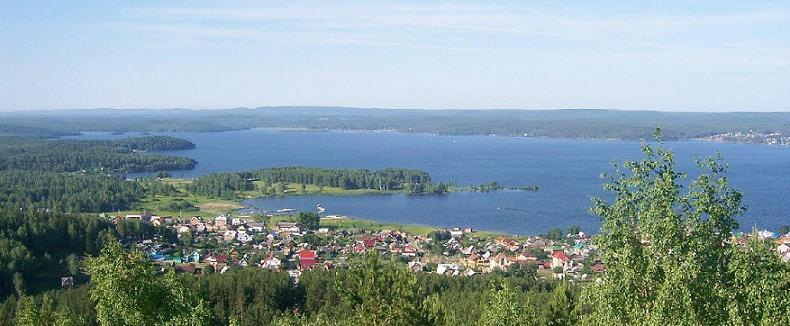

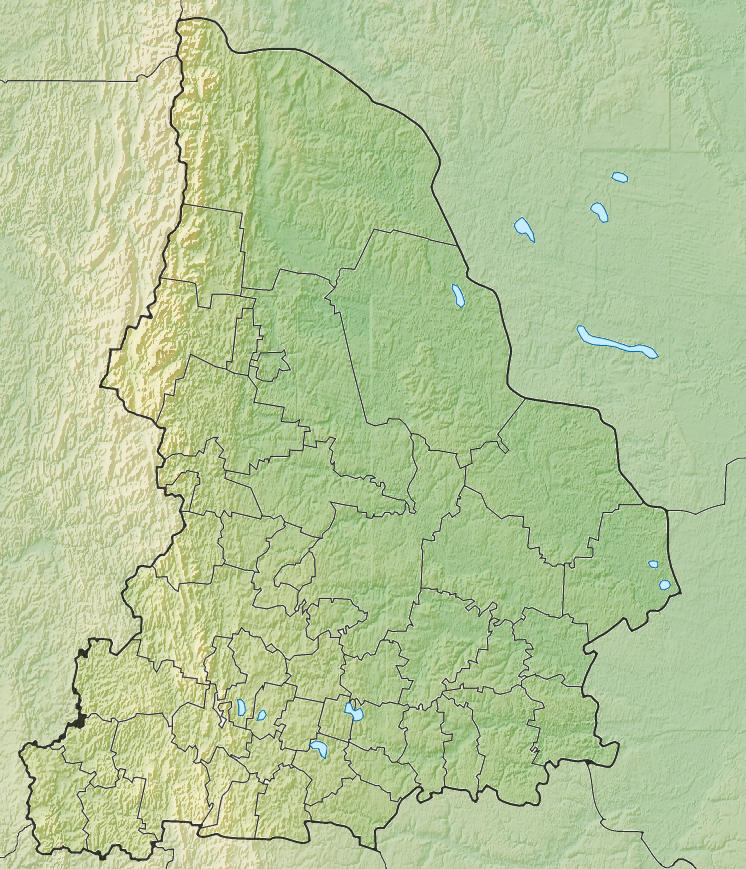
- Location within Sverdlovsk Oblast
- Location: Sverdlovsk Oblast, Russia
- Coordinates: 57°08′00″N 60°10′59″E
- Type: Freshwater
- Max. length: 10 km (6.2 mi)
- Max. width: 3–3.5 km (1.9–2.2 mi)
- Max. depth: 9 m (30 ft)

Lake Tavatui, also known as Lake Tavatuy, is a freshwater lake in Sverdlovsk Oblast, Russia. Several communities surround the lake and the nearest major city is Yekaterinburg. The lake is known for its high water quality and is a popular tourist attraction. The a website operated by the Russian Federal Agency for Tourism calls it "the pearl of the Middle Urals".

== Description ==
The lake basin was formed by the gradual movement of plate tectonics, and lies on top of a thick bed of granite, the Verh-Isetskiy granite massif. Core samples taken from the lakebed show evidence of the lake's granite foundation forming during the Late Pleistocene into the Early Pliocene era. Lake Tavatui is bordered by a number of tall hills and parts of the lake's shore is interspersed with granite outcroppings. Though geographically old, the lake's body of water is relatively young, having been formed by retreating glaciers between 10 and 20 thousand years ago. The glaciers' retreat also left a rich sedimentary bed of clay in the lake, and this sediment has been used to study the state of the ancient environment of the Holocene era.

Lake Tavatui has an elongated shape running north to south, as it is 10 km (6.2 mi) and only 3–3.5 km (1.9–2.2 mi) wide; the total area of the lake is around 21 km^{2} (8.1 sq mi). The lake is around 9 m (30 ft) deep, and contains several islands. The lake is well known for its high water quality and clarity, with the lake bed being visible from the surface in some conditions. The lake is warmest during the early summer months, cools during later summer months into the Ural fall, and freezes over between October and May during the intense Ural winter.

Human activity at Lake Tavatui likely began in the Holocene era, soon after the glaciers had begun to retreat. According to one source, the lake's name likely derives from several words in the Tartar language, tau (translating to mountain) and tui translating to feast. Other sources attribute the name of the lake to the Permians and Komi, with the peoples' word for waterway ta wa tui being translatable to waterway.

== See also ==
- Lake Iset
