= Miass (river) =

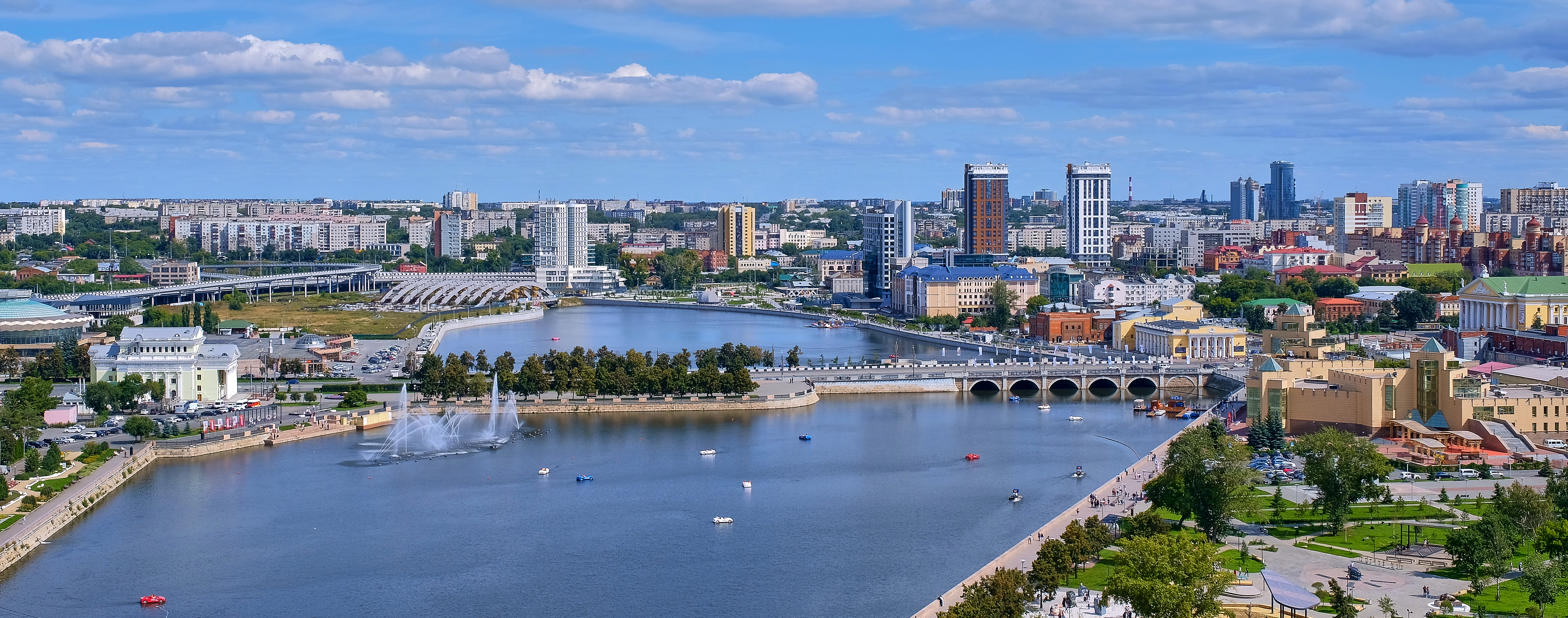

Location
- Country: Russia

Physical characteristics
- Mouth: Iset
  - coordinates: 56.0882°N 64.5°E
- Length: 658 km (409 mi)
- Basin size: 21,800 km^{2} (8,400 sq mi)

Basin features
- Progression: Iset→ Tobol→ Irtysh→ Ob→ Kara Sea

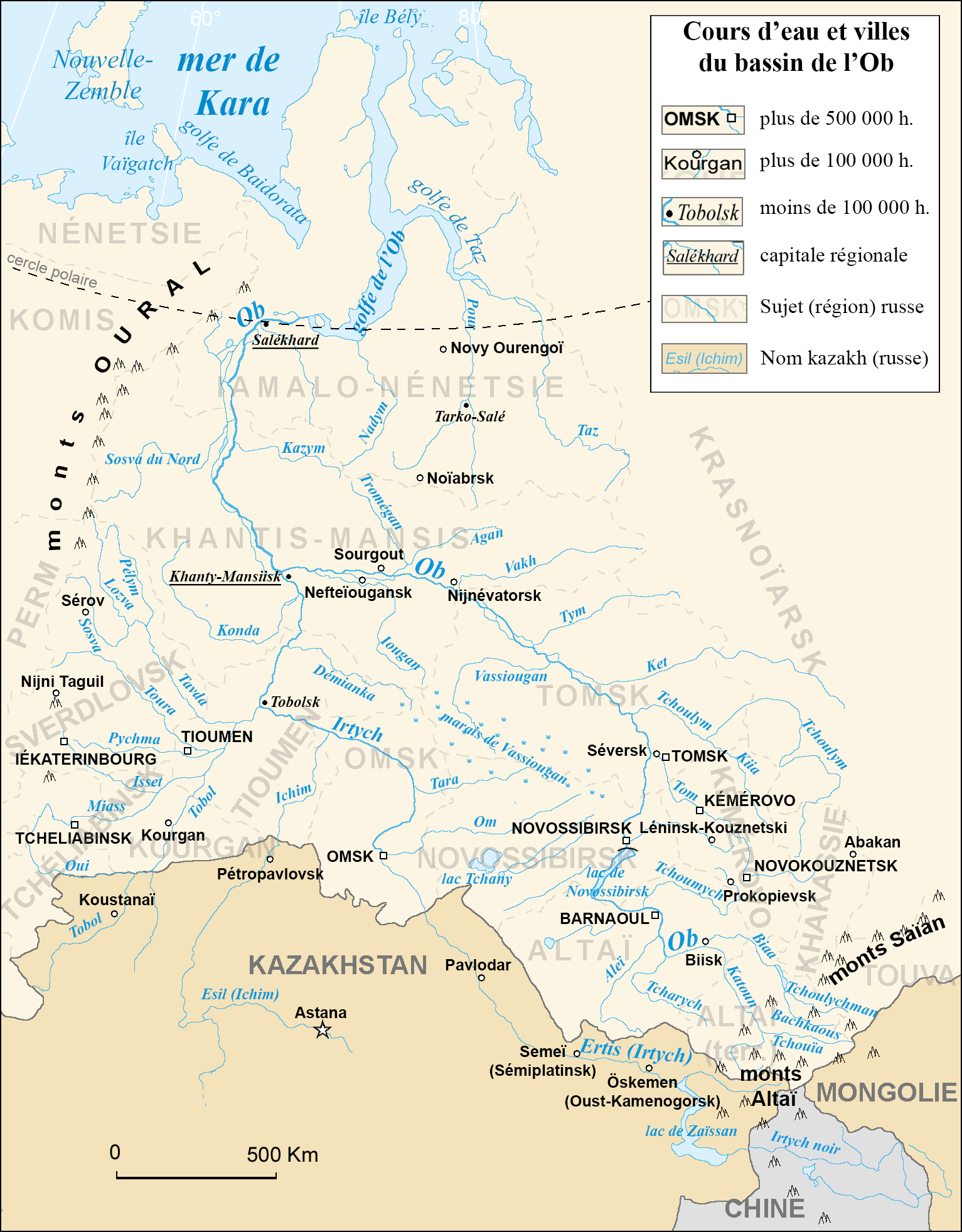
Miass River at the southwest corner of the Ob Basin (double click to expand)

The Miass (Bashkir: Мейәс, Meyäs) is a river that originates in the western part of the Ural Mountains, in the European part of Russia, and flows through Bashkortostan, Chelyabinsk Oblast and Kurgan Oblast, Russia. It is a right tributary of the Iset, part of the Irtysh basin. It is 149 kilometres (93 mi) long, and has a drainage basin of 13,700 square kilometres (5,300 sq mi). The cities Chelyabinsk and Miass are located on the river.
