= Verhne-Mutnovskaya Power Station =

Russian geothermal power plant

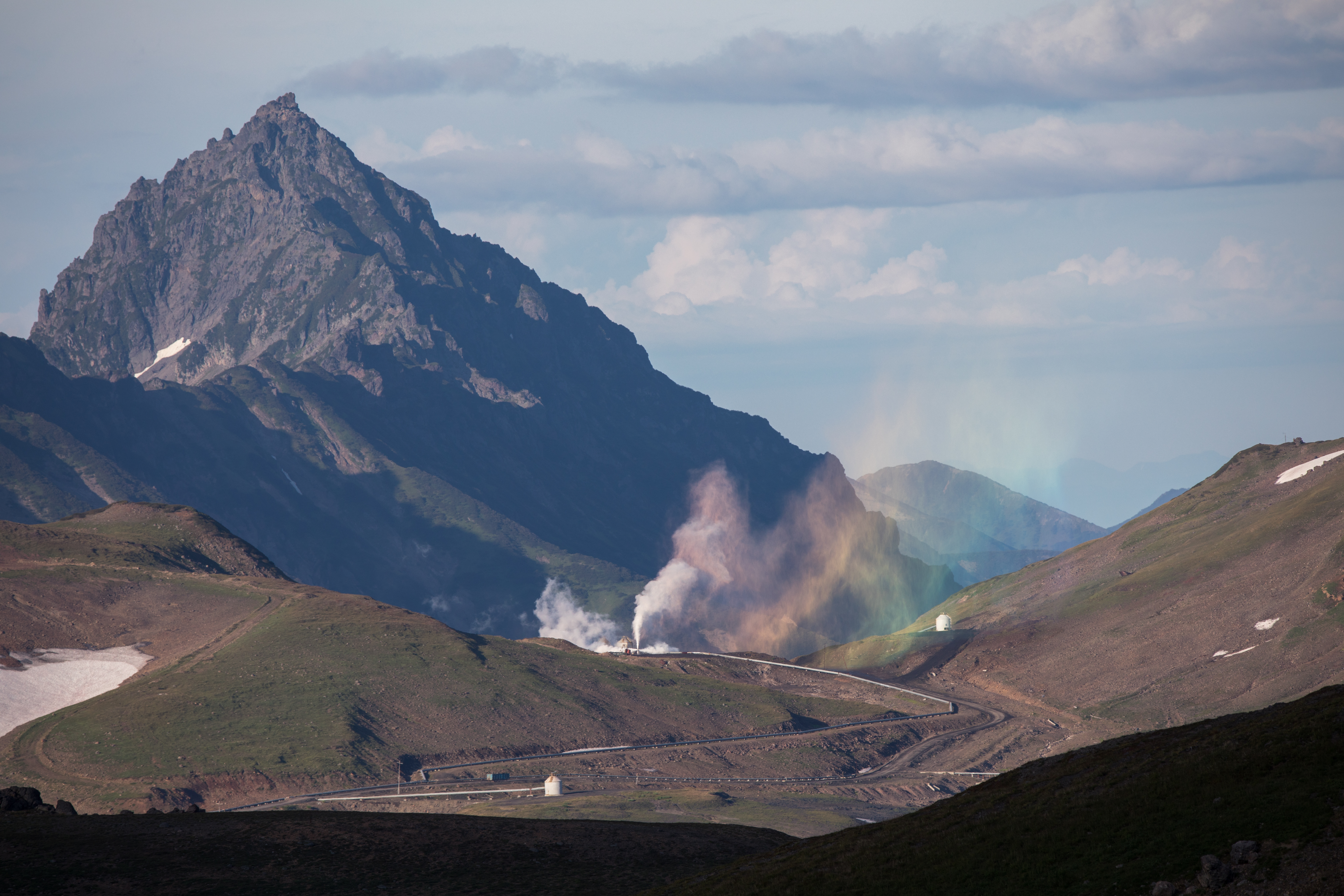
- Country: Russia
- Location: Petropavlovsk-Kamchatsky
- Coordinates: 52°33′05″N 158°14′16″E
- Status: Operational
- Commission date: 1999
- Owner: RusHydro

Geothermal power station
- Type: Flash steam

Power generation
- Units operational: 3 × 4MW
- Nameplate capacity: 12 MW

Verhne-Mutnovskaya power station is located in 60 km (37 mi) to the southwest of the city of Petropavlovsk-Kamchatsky, Russia. The power plant was put into operation in 1999. The power plant has three identical direct cycle turbines of 4 MW each. Each turbine is rated at 8.3 bars inlet pressure and a steam flowrate of 8.4 kg/s. Another feature of the station is an air-cooled condenser. The power plant is part of a single complex with Mutnovskaya power plant-1. These plants share the same geothermal field. This complex is involved in the Central Power Hub.
