= Mutnovskaya Power Station =

Geothermal power plant in Russia

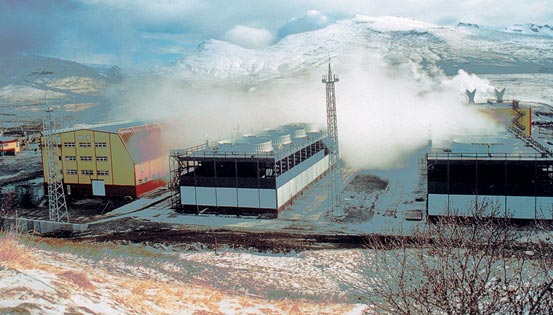
- Country: Russia
- Location: Petropavlovsk-Kamchatsky
- Coordinates: 52°32′19″N 158°12′06″E
- Status: Operational
- Commission date: 2003
- Owner: RusHydro

Geothermal power station
- Type: Flash steam
- Min. source temp.: 250 °C (482 °F)
- Wells: 12 in use
- Max. well depth: 2,300 m (7,500 ft)
- Combined cycle?: Yes
- Cogeneration?: Yes

Power generation
- Units operational: 2 × 25MW
- Nameplate capacity: 50 MW

Mutnovskaya power station is a geothermal power plant. It is the largest geothermal power plant in Russia, 60 km south from the administrative center of Petropavlovsk-Kamchatka region, on the bank of the Falshivaya River. Its capacity is 50 MW. The plant is operated by Geotherm JSC, a subsidiary of PJSC RusHydro.

The station is located northeast of the Mutnovskaya hill in the southeastern part of the Kamchatka Peninsula at an altitude of about 800 meters above sea level.

== History ==
=== The Soviet period ===
The first geothermal power plant in the USSR (Pauzhetskaya GeoPP) was built in Kamchatka in 1966. Based on the results of its successful operation, it was decided to continue the development of geothermal energy in the region. In 1974, the Institute of Volcanology of the Academy of Sciences of the USSR estimated the potential capacity of a geothermal station on the basis of the Mutnovsky deposit at 300-400 MW. In September 1977, the State Planning Committee of the USSR decided to build a 200 MW Mutnovskaya GeoPower plant with the introduction of the first units in 1984–1985.

The decree of the Central Committee of the CPSU and the USSR Council of Ministers on April 2, 1981, instructed the USSR Ministry of Geology to approve the reserves of the Mutnovskoye field, and the Ministry of Energy and Electrification of the USSR to build a geothermal power plant with a capacity of 150-250 MW, with the first phase of 50 MW in 1985.

In 1983, the construction of the first stage was delayed for 1986–1990. Reserves of the deposit were submitted to the State Reserves Committee only in 1987, and approved in 1990: according to category C1, 156.2 kg / s with a pressure of 6-8 ata and a calorific value of 660 kcal / kg corresponding to 78 MW of electric power.

The Construction Directorate was established in May 1988, the planned date of commissioning was again shifted to 1992. There were difficulties in placing orders for the main generating equipment, since machine-building enterprises gave priority to the serial equipment and did not want to develop specialized products. The years of perestroika began, the lack of financing in the crisis years of the 1990s further aggravated the construction process It entered service in 2003.

=== Russia ===
In 1995, the Ministry of Energy of the RSFSR approved the adjusted project of the Mutnovskaya GeoPP: the block-modular power units of the Kaluga Turbine Plant were selected as the main equipment . The continuation of the construction of GeoTES was recognized as a priority project for the development of the fuel and energy complex of the Kamchatka Territory.

To complete the construction and subsequent operation of the Mutnovsky GeoPP, Geotherm was established.

The EBRD participated in financing the construction.

In order to reduce the costs of transporting the steam-water mixture, it was decided to send steam from several remote from the well construction site to a separate small power plant - the Verkhne-Mutnovskaya GeoPP with a capacity of 12 MW, which was built before the main facility and was put into operation in December 1999.

The first power unit of the Mutnovskaya GeoPP was commissioned in December 2001, the solemn launch of the second power unit - in October 2002, the chairman of the board of RAO UES Anatoly Chubais took part in the ceremony. The use of geothermal energy has significantly weakened the dependence of the peninsula on expensive imported fuel oil.

The potential of the Mutnovsky geothermal field is not exhausted, the possibility of constructing a second phase of the GeoPower with a capacity of 50 MW is considered.

== Technology ==
The plant has two identical direct cycle turbines of 25 MW each. Each turbine is rated at 6.1 bars inlet pressure and a steam flowrate of 44.5 kg/s. The geothermal reservoir contains two-phase water. The reservoir temperature is 250-300 °C. Proven steam resources of are 172 kg/s. Fluid is extracted from 12 wells for a total steam flowrate of 156 kg/s. Wellhead pressures are 7-10 bars.

Separation of the mixture is done at the plant. The steam/water mixture from wells is transported by individual and common pipelines. Separated water and waste heat are fed into injection wells. The decision about two-phase transportation was the result of administrative intrigues.

Steam-water pipelines were built without hydraulic calculation until 2003. The optimal diameter of pipes sometimes was not determined. Some pipelines have experienced pressure loss, while some pipelines have experienced pulsations. Compensation of temperature extensions was implemented by curves in pipelines.

Hydraulic calculations related to pipelines began in 2003. Old pipes were reconstructed and new ones were built. Bellows expansion joints were established and the non-functional local resistances were eliminated. At present, the total length of pipelines of steam-water mixture is more than 10 km. The longest well depth is 2.3 km.

== See also ==
- Geothermal power in Russia
- Pauzhetskaya Power Station
