= Podporozhye =

Podporozhye (Russian: Подпоро́жье and Russian: По́дпорожье) is the name of several inhabited localities in Russia.

Urban localities

- Podporozhye, Leningrad Oblast, a town in Podporozhsky District of Leningrad Oblast; incorporated as Podporozhskoye Settlement Municipal Formation

Rural localities

- Podporozhye, Republic of Karelia, a settlement in Pudozhsky District of the Republic of Karelia
- Podporozhye, Krasnoyarsk Krai, a village in Mokrushinsky Selsoviet of Kazachinsky District of Krasnoyarsk Krai

Abolished localities

- Podporozhye, Arkhangelsk Oblast, a former village in Onezhsky District of Arkhangelsk Oblast
