= Enel Russia =

Russian power generation company

EL5-Energo
- Native name: ЭЛ5-Энерго
- Formerly: OGK-5; Enel OGK-5
- Type: Public (OAO)
- Traded as: MCX: ELFV
- Industry: Power generation (ISIC: 3510) Heat generation (ISIC: 3530)
- Predecessor: RAO UES
- Founded: 2004
- Headquarters: Yekaterinburg, Russia
- Key people: Alibek Tnalin (General Director)
- Products: Power and heat
- Revenue: $1.28 billion (2017)
- Operating income: $36 million (2020)
- Net income: $115 million (2019)
- Total assets: $1.08 billion (2019)
- Total equity: $363 million (2022)
- Owner: Lukoil (80.49%)
- Website: www.el5-energo.ru/en/

EL5-Energo (Full name: Public Joint Stock Company EL5-Energo; former names: OGK-5 and Enel OGK-5 and Enel Russia) is a Russian power generation company created by the reorganization of RAO UES, a former united power company of Russia. The company is registered in Yekaterinburg and its headquarters are in Moscow. The Russian energy company Lukoil holds a majority stake of EL5-Energo (80.49%).

== History ==
The company was founded as OGK-5 on 27 October 2004. In October 2006, the company ran an initial public offering, offering 5.1 billion shares with a total value of US$459 million. In June 2007, Enel bought 29.99% of the shares in the company, previously owned by RAO UES. In October 2007, Enel increased its stake to 37.15% and later to 56.43%. On 7 July 2009, the company was renamed Enel OGK-5 and was registered as Enel Russia on 8 August 2014.

On 25 June 2015, its name changed from Open Joint Stock Company Enel Russia to Public Joint Stock Company Enel Russia. The new abbreviated company name was PJSC Enel Russia.

In 2019, Enel sold the 3,800 MW Reftinskaya GRES coal-fired plant, its largest coal-fired plant, to the Kuzbassenergo company. The transfer was completed on 1 July 2020.

In 2020, Enel signed a deal to expand renewable energy development in the Republic of Tatarstan in collaboration with the Ministry of Industry and Trade.

In March 2022, Enel announced its decision to exit the Russian market. The exit was completed after signing two agreements for the sale of its 56.43% controlling stake in PJSC Enel Russia – specifically, one sale contract with PJSC Lukoil and another with the Closed Combined Mutual Investment Fund “Gazprombank-Frezia”, fully disposing of Enel’s electricity generation assets in Russia.

On 25 November 2022, an extraordinary general meeting of shareholders decided to rename the company to its current name, “EL5-Energo”.

== Operations ==
The gross installed electrical capacity of Enel Russia is 5,739.9 MW for power generation and 2,032 Gcal/h for heat generation. Enel Russia operates Konakovskaya GRES, Nevinnomysskaya GRES, and Sredneuralskaya GRES in addition to its wind farm projects.

=== Sredneuralskaya GRES ===
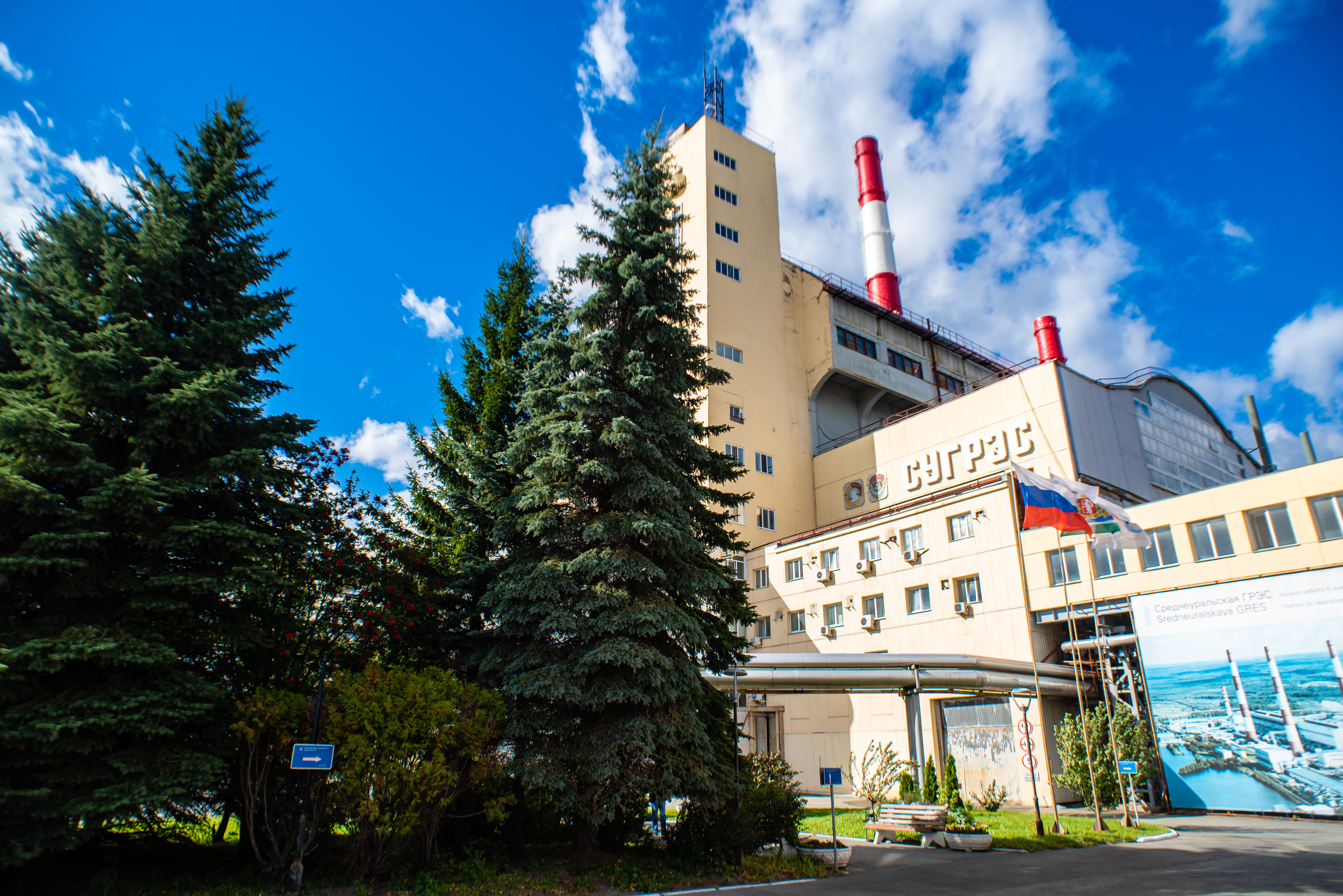
Sredneuralskaya GRES

Sredneuralskaya GRES (SUGRES) is a thermal power plant powered by natural gas with a total installed electric capacity of 1,578.5 MW. The plant's 1st stage includes five medium pressure boilers (34 standard atmospheres (3,400 kPa) abs) and three turbo-units with a capacity of 16 MW, 46 MW, and 16 MW. In 2017, SUGRES decommissioned turbo-units Nos.1, 2, and 5 (with a total capacity of 78 MW). The 2nd stage includes three high pressure boilers (140 standard atmospheres (14,000 kPa) abs) and three turbo-units with respective capacities of 100, 100 and 38 MW. The 3rd stage features two two-boiler single-turbine units for supercritical parameters with capacities of 310 and 300 MW, and the 4th stage includes one two-boiler single-turbine unit for supercritical parameters with a capacity of 300 MW. The 4th stage also includes a CCGT unit with a capacity of 419 MW. The power plant also has a gas turbine expansion station (GTES) with a capacity of 11.5 MW.

The installed heat capacity of the plant is 1,327 Gcal/h. On 6 January 1936, the first turbo-unit was put into operation. In 1937 the second turbine was put into operation, and in 1939 the third turbo-unit was put into operation. Between 1950 and 1953, the first complex automation of thermal processes in the country started at SUGRES. In 1960, a high powered district heating system providing an output of 1,150 Gcal of heat power and 2,000 tons of hot water per hour for the cities of Sverdlovsk, Verkhnyaya Pyshma, and Sredneuralsk was put into operation at SUGRES. In 1985, SUGRES put into operation a water treatment and heating facility with a capacity of 6,000 t/h. The facility was supplied by a water conduit drawing from the Volchikhinskoye water reservoir. Such filtration facilities had not previously been used in the Soviet energy sector.

In 1982, SUGRES converted the first stage of the power plant from coal to natural gas, with oil as a backup fuel. On 25 July 2011, a new 410 MW CCGT was put into operation. The installed capacity of Sredneuralskaya GRES CCGT is 419 MW.

=== Nevinnomysskaya GRES ===
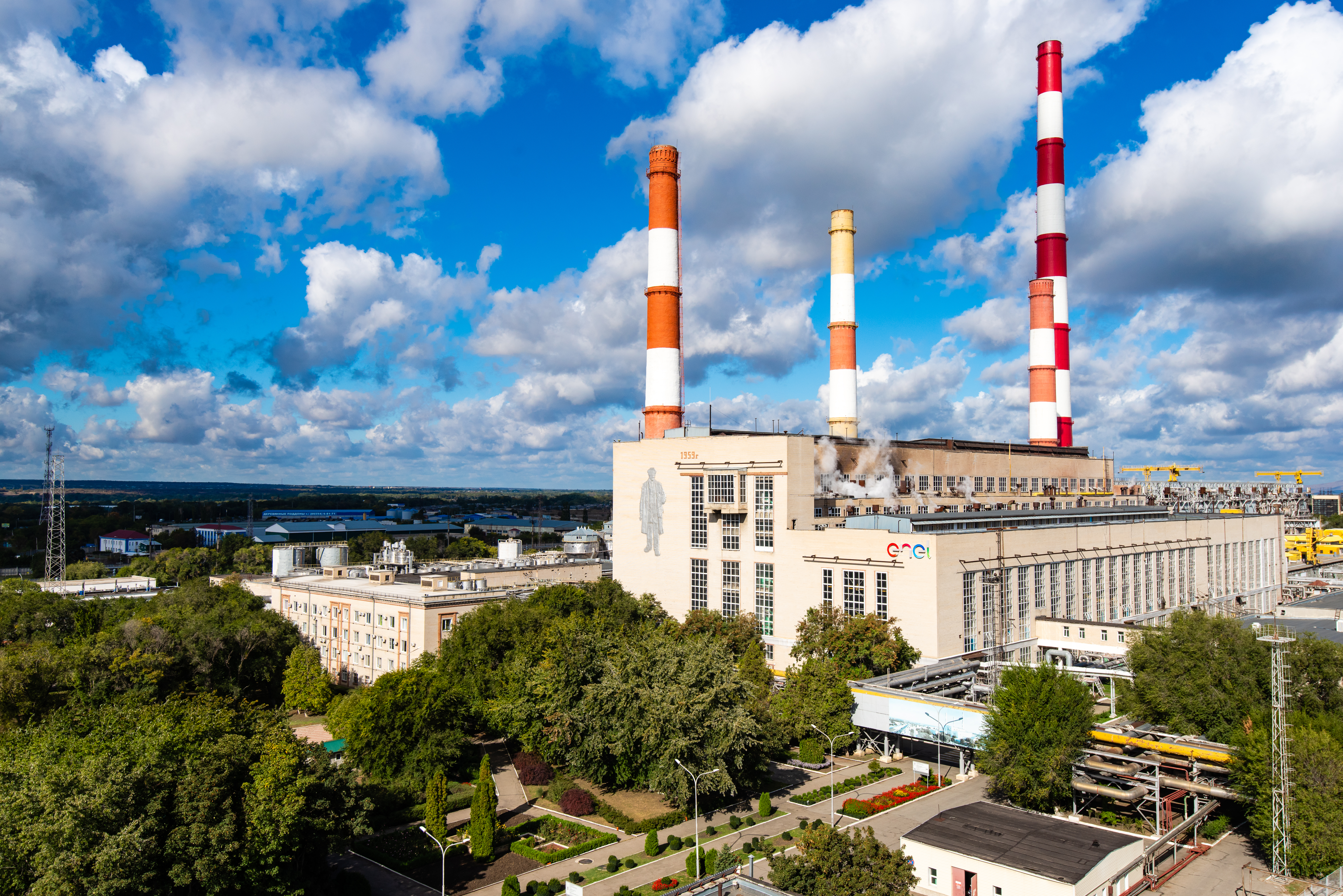
Nevinnomysskaya GRES

Nevinnomysskaya GRES is one of the largest thermal power plants in the North Caucasus. It is located in Nevinnomyssk, Stavropol Krai. The installed electric capacity of GRES is 1,551.4 MW and heat capacity is 585 Gcal/hour. Nevinnomysskaya GRES consists of a combined heat and power (CHP) facility (185 MW, 585 Gcal/hour), open set condensate power units (935 MW), and a combined cycle gas turbine (CCGT) unit (410.2 MW). 12 turbines and 14 boilers are installed at the power plant. The water supply for the power equipment is drawn from the Great Stavropol Canal and the Kuban River. The plant's main fuel is natural gas and its backup fuel is oil. The first turbo-unit of Nevinnomysskaya GRES was put into operation on 25 June 1960. The startup of a newly constructed 410.2 MW CCGT on 15 July 2011 resulted in a significant increase in the power plant's installed capacity.

=== Konakovskaya GRES ===
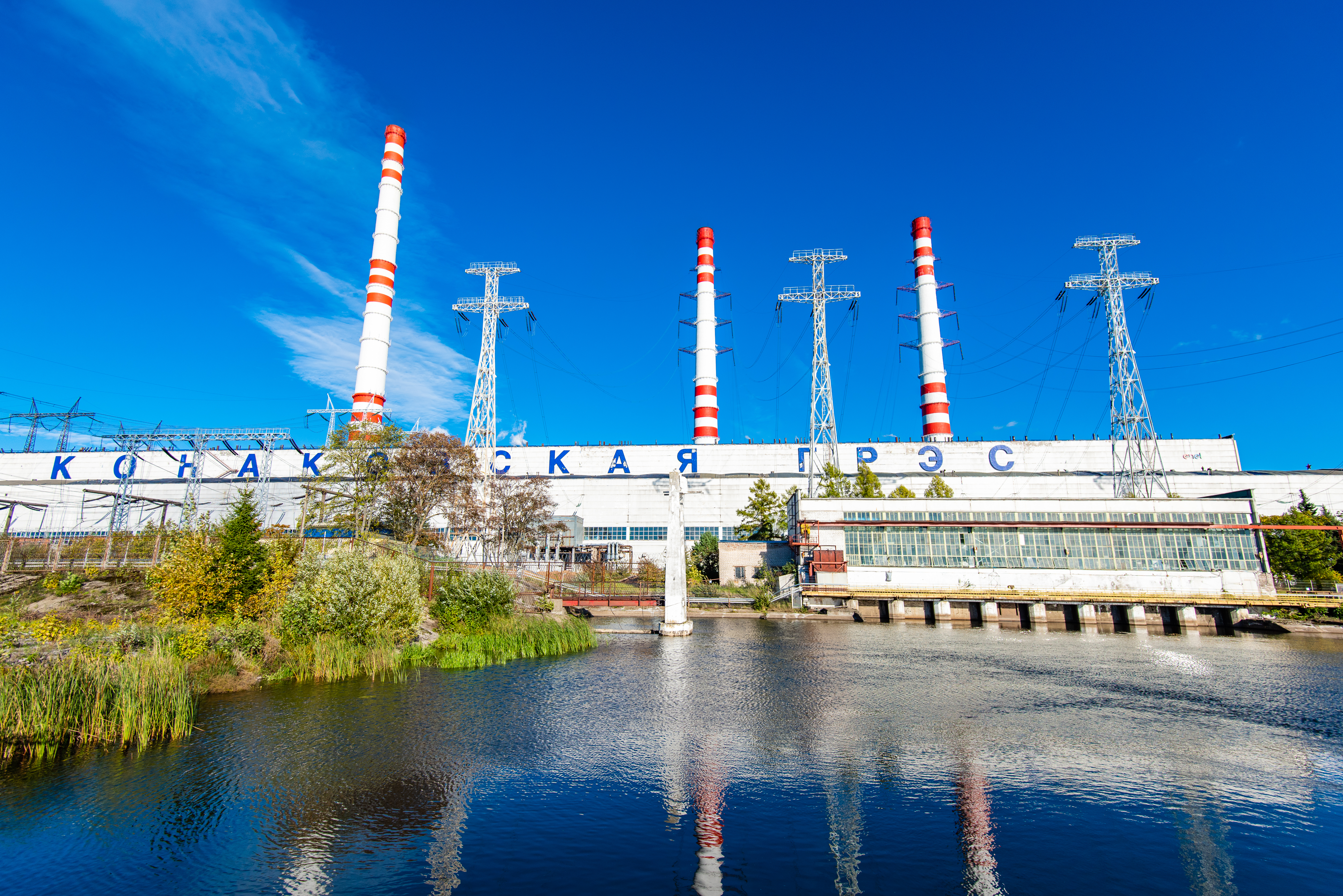
Konakovskaya GRES

Konakovskaya GRES (KGRES) is located on the banks of the Volga River near Konakovo, Tver Region, and is one of the region's largest suppliers of electric power and heat. The installed electric capacity of the power plant is 2,520 MW and its heat capacity is 120 Gcal/hour. The power plant includes 8 power units with a total capacity of 300–325 MW. The power plant was built in two phases, each with 4 power units and 4 turbo-units, bearing a capacity of 300 MW per phase. The construction of Konakovskaya GRES began in 1962. On 10 January 1965, the first power unit was put into operation. The construction of Konakovskaya GRES was fully completed in 1969. The plant's main fuel is natural gas. Its backup fuel is oil.

=== Wind farms ===
In June 2017, Enel Russia won the tender for the construction of two windfarms, one in the Murmansk Region with an installed capacity of 201 MW and one near Azov in the Rostov region with a capacity of 90 MW. On 23 May 2019, the groundbreaking ceremony of the Azovskaya wind farm construction was held. In June 2019, following federal tender results. On 19 September 2019 construction began on the 201 MW Kolskaya wind farm, the largest renewable project in the Arctic Circle.

== Corporate issues ==
The company's share capital is 35,371,898,370 rubles divided into ordinary shares with a par value of 1 ruble.

The Enel SpA share in the company’s authorised capital is 56.43%, UROC Limited is 7.4%, RDIF Investment Management-8 is 5.54%, and other minority shareholders’ share is 30.63%.

Enel Russia shares are included in the first level quotation list at the exchange platform of MICEX Stock Exchange.

The company's income for 2020, according to IFRS, was RUB44.037 billion. The EBITDA evaluation put their income at RUB9.017 billion, and their net ordinary income is RUB4.467 billion.

Giorgio Callegari has been the chairman of the board since 23 April 2020. Stephane Zweguintzow has been the general director since 2 June 2020.
