= Konakovo Power Station =

Power station in Konakovo, Tver, Russia

Konakovo Power Station Konakovo GRES
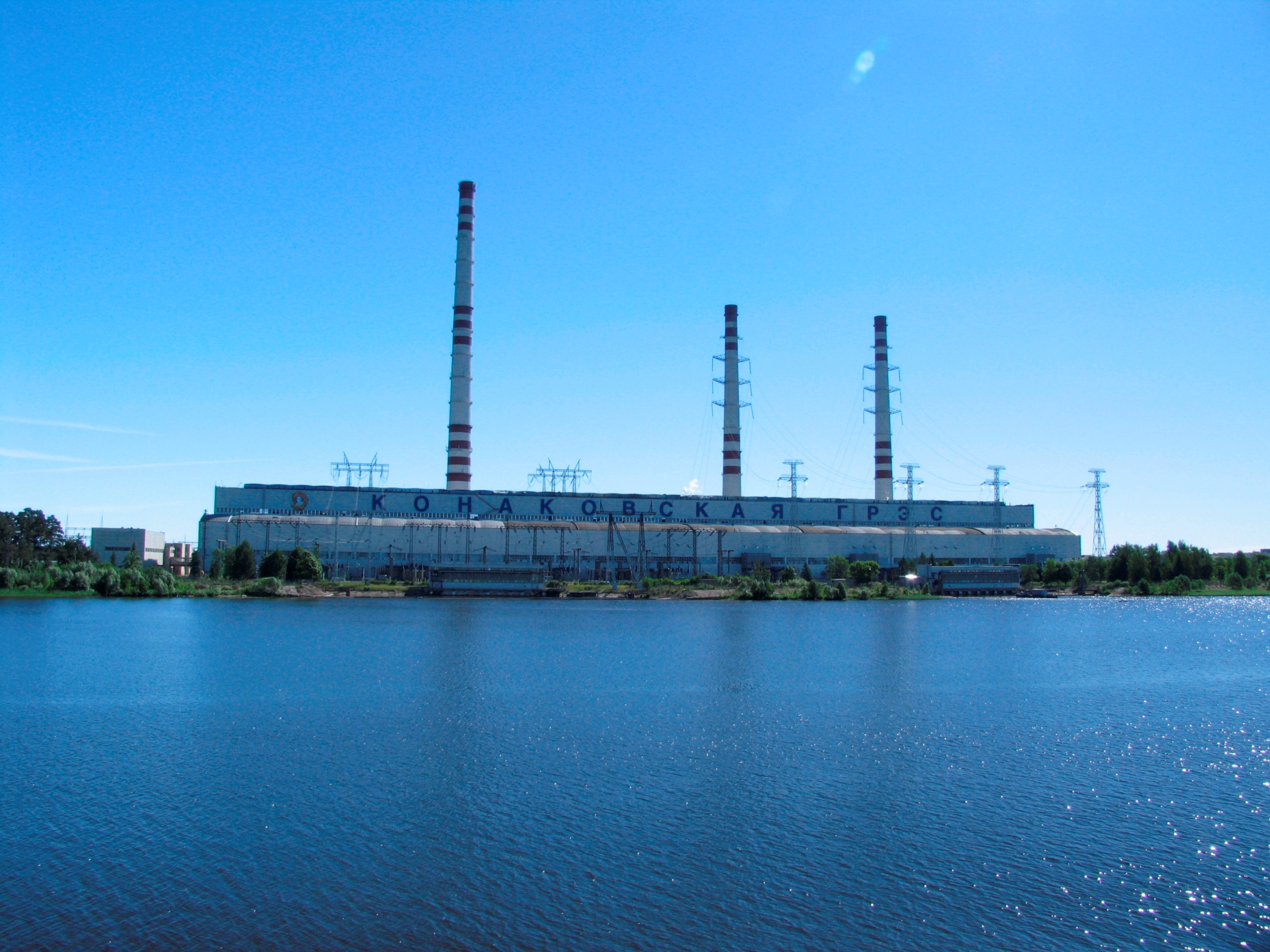
- Konakovskaya GRES. View from Volga river (2007)
- Country: Russia
- Location: Konakovo, Tver Oblast
- Coordinates: 56°44′35″N 36°46′13″E
- Status: Operational
- Construction began: 1962
- Commission date: 1965
- Owner: Enel Russia

Thermal power station
- Primary fuel: Natural gas
- Secondary fuel: Heavy fuel oil
- Cogeneration?: yes

Power generation
- Units operational: 8
- Nameplate capacity: 2,520 MW

External links
- Commons: Related media on Commons

Konakovo Power Station (Konakovskaya GRES) is a thermal power plant located alongside the Ivankovo Reservoir in Konakovo, Tver Oblast, Russia. It is a subsidiary of Enel Russia and one of the largest energy producers in Central Russia.

== History ==
Construction of the power station began in 1962. It was done in two stages with capacity of 1,200 megawatts (MW) each. The first unit was launched on 10 January 1965. In 1966, the fourth unit was launched, and the first stage was completed. In 1969, the second stage was completed with four additional units. The power plant achieved its full planned capacity of 2,400 MW in 1972. After the modernization of some units, the power plant achieved a capacity of 2,520 MW.

Originally, the power plant operated on heavy fuel oil (mazut) before transferring to natural gas in 1982, leaving mazut as a reserve fuel.

During the Russian invasion of Ukraine, the facility was targeted by a Ukrainian drone attack on 1 September 2024.

== Technical description ==
Installed electric capacity at the end of 2013 was 2,520 MW with a heat capacity of 120 gigacalories per hour (Gcal/hr). In 2013 Konakovskaya GRES produced 8,394 gigawatt hours (GWh) of energy. The useful output of heat energy for the same period was 228,000 Gcal.

There are eight units, each of which includes heat boiler ПП-950-255-ГМ (ПК-41), turbounit К-325-240-7МР or К-305-240 of LMF and electro generator ТВВ-320-2-УЗ or ТВВ-350-2-УЗ of Electrosila.

=== Fuel ===
The main fuel for Konakovskaya GRES according to the project is natural gas, while mazut is used as reserve fuel since 1982. But for some reason the power plant had run on mazut from the end of 1960s to the 1980s inclusively. The portion of mazut in fuel balance is less than 0.001 %. Gas enters the power plant through two independent high pressure gas conduits. Mazut facilities of ТТЦ include a store of 12 ferro-concrete reservoirs of 10×10^{3} m^{3} (350×10^{3} cu ft) and six ferro-concrete reservoirs of 20×10^{3} m^{3} (710×10^{3} cu ft). Drain racks allow 132 railway tanks to pour out at once. Heaters, filters, pumps and control position are situated in special buildings. Mazut is piped to the main building from two mauconseil through two independent conduits to units of the first and second line. Gas is piped to boilers from two gas control points.

=== Technical water supply ===
The technical water supply system is uniflow. A water fence from the Volga river is made by two coastal pump power plants to the first and second units. Each of them has eight vertical circulating pumps ОП-5ПВ with capacity 5 m^{3}/s (180 cu ft/s). The average water fence is 30,000 m^{3}/h (1,100,000 cu ft/h) per unit. Pipe bend is through assigning channel. The channel is underground on the territory of power plant and includes four ferro-concrete lines. Its length extends 2.4 km (1.5 mi) beyond the channel's bounds.

=== Drainage and purification of stocks ===
Domestic and industrial wastewater are transferred to city treatment plants in Konakovo.

=== Heat energy ===
Hot water used to heat Konakovo power plants and constitute part of the rechange system are preheated in a block heating installation, including main boilers, peaking hot-water heaters, the drain coolers of boiler and heating-system water pumps. Water is drawn from waterwell holes and two storage tanks.

==== Funnels ====
Gases from boiler stocks enter the atmosphere through three funnels. Two first-line funnel are 180 metres (590 ft) tall, with each funnel servicing two units. On the second line, there is a 250-metre (820 ft) tall funnel for the next four units (No. 5–8). Funnel No. 1 was built in 1964, and funnel No. 2 in 1966 on the basis of height that the power plant would work on natural gas. When the third funnel was built in 1969, Konakovskaya GRES became a mazut-fueled power plant and the decision was made to build the funnel 250 metres (820 ft) tall to transport and disperse emissions higher. At night all funnels are illuminated by flood lamps.
