= 2013 China–Russia floods =

Natural disaster in eastern Russia and northeastern China

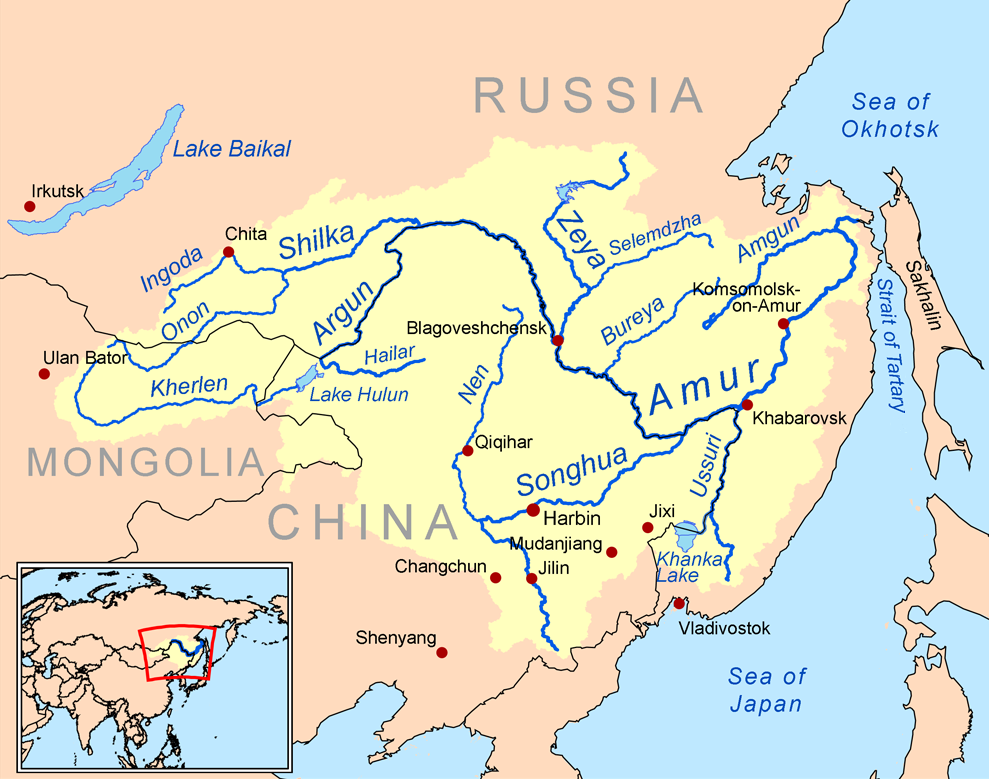
- Cities and villages located within the Amur River Basin were hardest hit by floods.
- Date: August 10, 2013 to November 6, 2013
- Location: (China) Heilongjiang, Jilin, Liaoning, Guangdong (Russia) Amur, Khabarovsk (Mongolia) Kherlen region
- Deaths: (Russia) :1 soldier dead, civilians-none. (China) :84 dead, 105 missing, 840,000 displaced Total:85 dead, 105 missing, 860,000 displaced
- Property damage: $2.6 billion 37 million people affected

During mid-August 2013 parts of eastern Russia and northeastern China were stricken by heavy flooding. At least 85 people died from the floods and more than 105 others were left missing as of August 19. More than 60,000 homes were destroyed and 840,000 people evacuated from Heilongjiang, Jilin, and Liaoning provinces due to flooding which happened at the same time as flooding in China's southern Guangdong province.

== Floods and damage ==
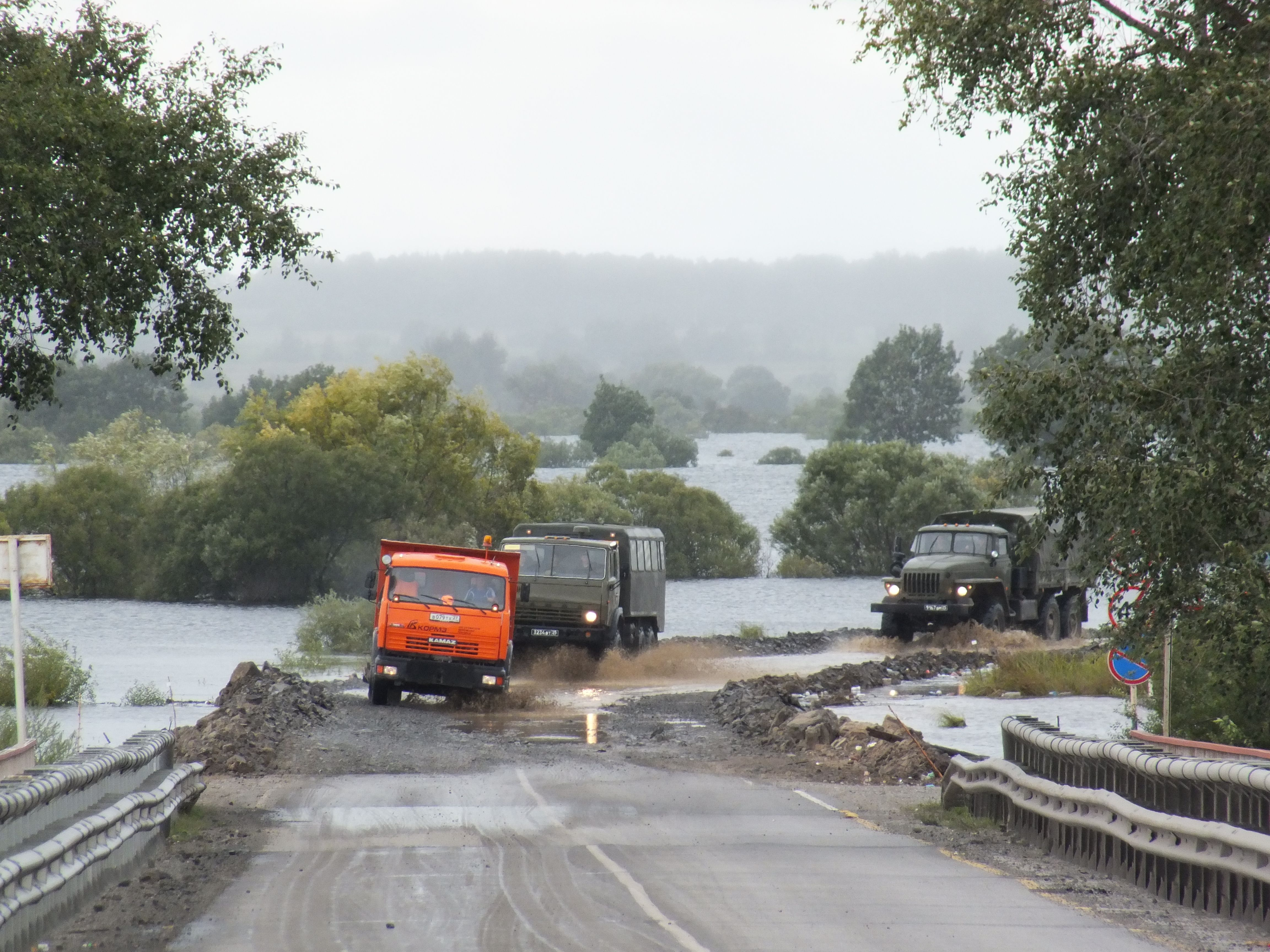
Khabarovsk-Komsomolsk Highway, September 1

From the end of July to mid-August 2013, unusually heavy rainfall occurred near the Amur River, which marks the dividing line between China and Russia. Starting on August 10, 2013, areas of northeastern China began to experience flooding. From August 15 to 17, heavy rainfall worsened the problem, causing the worst flooding in the region in more than a decade. Nankouqian Township, one of the hardest-hit areas, saw 44.9 centimetres (17.7 in) of rain, half the average annual total, on August 16 alone. By August 18, water levels at 61 reservoirs surpassed the "danger" level. Fushun city in the Liaoning province was especially hard hit as rainstorms caused several rivers in the city to overflow. Across the border in eastern Russia, heavy flooding was also reported, with Amur Oblast, Jewish Autonomous Oblast and Khabarovsk Krai the hardest hit. More than 140 towns were affected by what Russia authorities described as the worst flooding in 120 years. The Amur River reached a record 100.56 metres (329.9 ft), surpassing the previous record set in 1984, and was still rising as of August 19, threatening to flood the major city of Komsomolsk-on-Amur.

In China, more than 60,000 homes were destroyed and numerous roads were blocked or damaged. More than 787,000 hectares of farm land were ruined in the region which depends heavily on farming. Power and communications lines were downed in several townships. Total damaged was estimated at 16.14 billion yuan (approx. US$2.6 billion/€1.94 billion). In Russia, 3.2 billion rubles (approx. US$97 million/€73 million) was allocated for relief efforts.

== Casualties ==
China's Liaoning province was the hardest hit with 54 reported deaths and 97 people missing as of August 19, 2013. In Jilin province, 16 deaths were reported. Heilongjiang province experienced 11 deaths. Across the region 360,000 people were displaced and 3.74 million affected in some way. No casualties were reported in Russia, but 20,000 people were evacuated. Two captive brown bears were rescued via helicopter.

Unrelated flooding resulting from Typhoon Utor in south China occurred simultaneously, causing the death tolls from the two floods to be combined in official reports. Typhoon Utor floods killed at least 33 people.

== Relief efforts and aftermath ==
In Russia, more than 30,000 volunteers helped distribute 53 tons of food and supplies to flood victims. Officials are considering delaying the mayoral elections in Amur which are scheduled for September 8. A decision on the elections will be made August 27.

Chinese Communist Party general secretary Xi Jinping called for "all-out efforts" as relief work got underway. More than 120,000 people, including 10,000 soldiers, helped with relief and rescue efforts.

== See also ==
- 2013 North India floods
- 2013 Pakistan–Afghanistan floods
- 2013 Southwest China floods
