= Iset (river) =

River in the Urals and Western Siberia, Russia

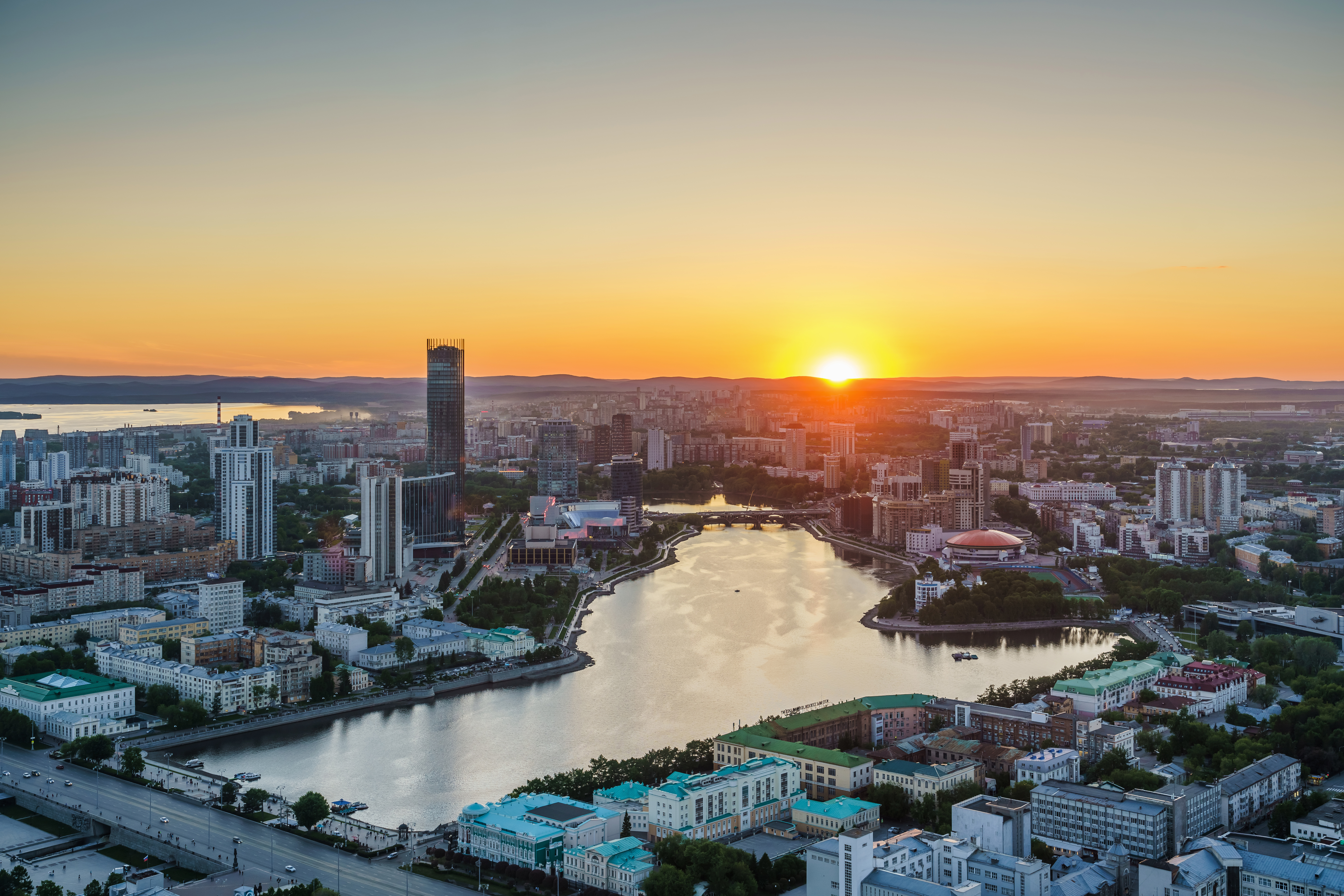
- The Iset in Yekaterinburg

- Iset in the Tobol watershed

Location
- Country: Russia

Physical characteristics
- Source: Lake Iset
- Mouth: Tobol
  - coordinates: 56°35′55″N 66°17′22″E
- Length: 606 km (377 mi)
- Basin size: 58,900 km^{2} (22,700 sq mi)
- Discharge
  - average: 73.08 m^{3}/s (2,581 cu ft/s)

Basin features
- Progression: Tobol→ Irtysh→ Ob→ Kara Sea
- Tributaries
  - right: Techa, Miass

The river Iset (Russian: Исеть) in Russia flows from the Urals through the Sverdlovsk and Kurgan Oblasts, then through Tyumen Oblast in Western Siberia into the river Tobol. The city of Yekaterinburg is on the upper part of the river.

Yekaterinburg's downtown on the Iset embankment

The Iset is 606 kilometres (377 mi) long, and has a drainage basin of 58,900 square kilometres (22,700 sq mi).

The Techa and the Miass are tributaries of the Iset.
