= Sredneuralsk =

Town in Sverdlovsk Oblast, Russia

Sredneuralsk Среднеуральск
- Town
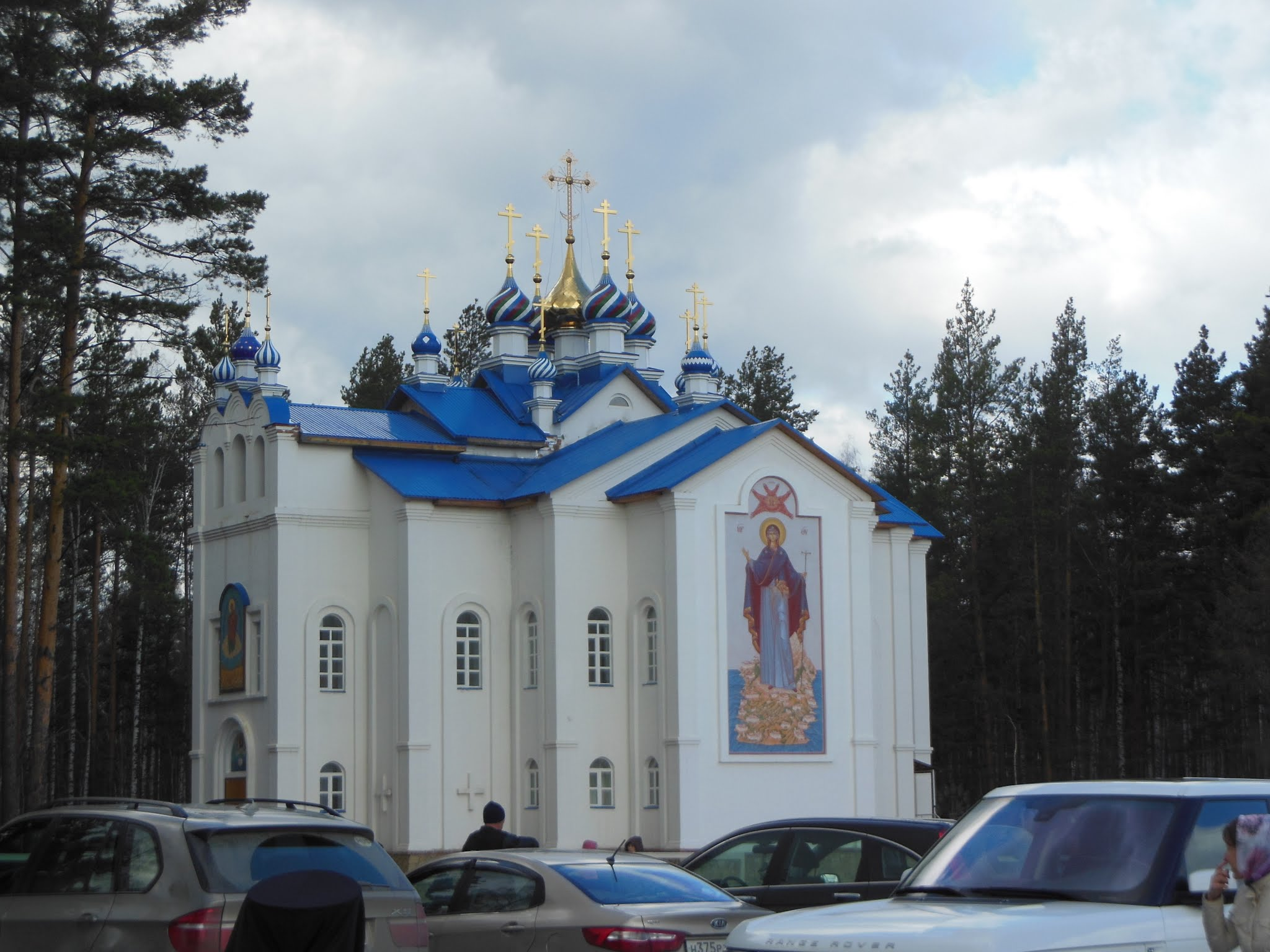

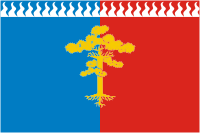
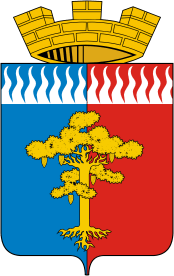
- Flag Coat of arms
- Interactive map of Sredneuralsk
- Location of Sredneuralsk Sredneuralsk (Sverdlovsk Oblast)
- Coordinates: 56°59′N 60°28′E
- Country: Russia
- Federal subject: Sverdlovsk Oblast
- Founded: June 27, 1931
- Town status since: February 17, 1966

Government
  - Mayor: Alexey Danilov
- Elevation: 270 m (890 ft)

Population (2010 Census)
  - Total: 20,449
  - Estimate (2025): 24,103 (+17.9%)

Administrative status
  - Subordinated to: Town of Verkhnyaya Pyshma

Municipal status
  - Urban okrug: Sredeuralsk Urban Okrug
  - Capital of: Sredeuralsk Urban Okrug
- Time zone: UTC+5 (MSK+2)
- Postal codes: 624070, 624071
- Dialing code: +7 34368
- OKTMO ID: 65757000001
- Website: sredneuralsk.ru

Sredneuralsk (Russian: Среднеура́льск) is a town under the administrative jurisdiction of the Town of Verkhnyaya Pyshma in Sverdlovsk Oblast, Russia, located on the shore of Iset Lake, at the head of the Iset River, 25 kilometers (16 mi) north of Yekaterinburg. Population: 20,449 (2010 census); 19,555 (2002 Census); 18,786 (1989 Soviet census).

== History ==
It was founded in on June 27, 1931. Town status was granted to it on February 17, 1966.

== Administrative and municipal status ==
Within the framework of the administrative divisions, it is, together with twenty-seven rural localities, subordinated to the Town of Verkhnyaya Pyshma—an administrative unit with the status equal to that of the districts. As a municipal division, Sredneuralsk, together with three rural localities, is incorporated as Sredneuralsk Urban Okrug. The town of Verkhnyaya Pyshma and twenty-four rural localities are incorporated separately as Verkhnyaya Pyshma Urban Okrug.

== Climate ==
The climate of Sredneyralsk is continental. The average temperature amplitude is −45 °C (−49 °F) to +38 °C (100 °F). The average temperature in January is −16 °C (3 °F); in July: +17.4 °C (63.3 °F). The snow cover usually stays on surface for up to five months from November to the middle of April. The average year precipitation is 430–500 millimeters (17–20 in). The town is situated 252–278 meters (827–912 ft) above sea level.

The main rock soil components are granite and argillaceous slates.

== Economy ==
Thermal power station "SUGRES" is based in Sredneuralsk. The station was officially opened on June 27, 1931. Other industrial enterprises include:

- Sredneuralsk Metallurgical Plant (est. 1941)
- Sredneuralsk Concrete Product Plant (est. 1964)
- Sredneuralsk Housing Construction Company (est. 1966)
- Sredneuralsk Railway Transport Enterprise (est. 1975)
- Wine Factory (est. 1960)
- Poultry Plant (est. 1973)

=== Transportation ===
The town is connected to the main bus route. The route length from Sredneuralsk to Yekaterinburg is 25 kilometers (16 mi).

== Education and culture ==
There are three secondary and primary schools, one kindergarten, and a campus of the Ural Metallurgical College in Sredneuralsk.

There is also Volna Culture and Leisure Centre (previously Volna cinema) and a library of 70,000 books.

== Tourism ==
There are about thirty architecture points of interest in Sredneuralsk, such as Chortovo Gorodishche, Sem Bratyev (Seven Brothers), etc.
