= Pauzhetskaya power station =

Geothermal power plant in Kamchatka, Russia

- Country: Russia
- Location: Kamchatka Peninsula
- Coordinates: 51°27′55″N 156°48′42″E
- Status: Operational
- Commission date: 1966
- Owner: RusHydro

Geothermal power station
- Type: Flash steam
- Min. source temp.: 190 °C (374 °F)
- Wells: 10 in use
- Combined cycle?: Yes
- Cogeneration?: Yes

Power generation
- Units operational: 2 × 6MW; 1 x 2.5 MW
- Nameplate capacity: 14.5 MW

The Pauzhetskaya power station is located in the southwestern part of the Kamchatka Peninsula, 30 kilometres (19 mi) east of Ozernovskij settlement, located on the coast of the Okhotsk Sea. The geothermal power plant was put into operation in 1966. The power plant has two 6 MW direct-cycle turbines and one 2.5 MW binary-cycle turbine. The first steam turbine is designed for an inlet pressure of 1.2 bars and a steam flow rate of 24.2 kg/s. The second steam turbine is designed for an inlet pressure of 2.2 bars and a steam flow rate of 25.8 kg/s. The binary turbine is designed for a separated water flow rate of 118 kg/s at 120 °C. Presently, one steam turbine is in operation, while the other steam turbine is a reserve.

== Power plant ==
At the time of putting the plant into operation, its installed capacity was only 5 MW; it was two turbogenerator units with 2.5-MW MK-2.5 condensing turbines manufactured by the Kaluga Turbine Plant (1964) and turbo-generators of T2-2.5 type -2 production Lysvenskogo turbogenerator plant (1964 year of release). By 1980, the installed capacity reached 11 MW.

In 2006, the first turbogenerator plant was reconstructed (new equipment was installed—a 6 MW steam turbine of the type GTPA-631 produced by OAO Kirovsky Zavod and a turbogenerator of the T-6-2U type produced by JSC Privod in Lysva). In early 2009, the TG-2 (MK-2,5) was decommissioned due to complete physical deterioration and the inability to continue operation.

The installed capacity of the power plant at the end of 2010 is 12.0 MW. Generation of electricity is carried out with the help of turbines operating on the geothermal steam of the Pauzhetskoye (Kambal) hydrothermal field. The available capacity of the power plant is 6.0 MW and is limited by the amount of geothermal steam supplied.

In 2010, reconstruction began to increase the capacity of the power plant to 14.5 MW (the project "Establishment of a pilot binary power unit with a capacity of 2.5 MW"). In July 2011, the main work was completed on installing the unit's equipment, laying additional pipes from the wells of the Pauzhetskoye field, and laying water conduits for cooling (total length ≈ 3600 m). The new block was planned to be launched in 2011.

On 1 January 2006, the power plant was separated from OJSC Kamchatskenergo and began operating as an independent legal entity—OJSC Pauzhetskaya GeoPP. Since December 28, 2009, JSC Pauzhetskaya GeoPP is a member of JSC RusHydro Holding: JSC Geoterm (SDO of JSC RusHydro) owns 100% of the ordinary registered shares of JSC Pauzhetskaya GeoPP.

== Geothermal reservoir ==
The geothermal reservoir contains water with a temperature of about 190 °C. Proven steam resources of the Pauzhetska field are 35.5 kg/s (steam-water mixture—424.5 kg/s). This steam-water mixture is produced from 10 wells.
