= RusHydro =

Russian electricity company

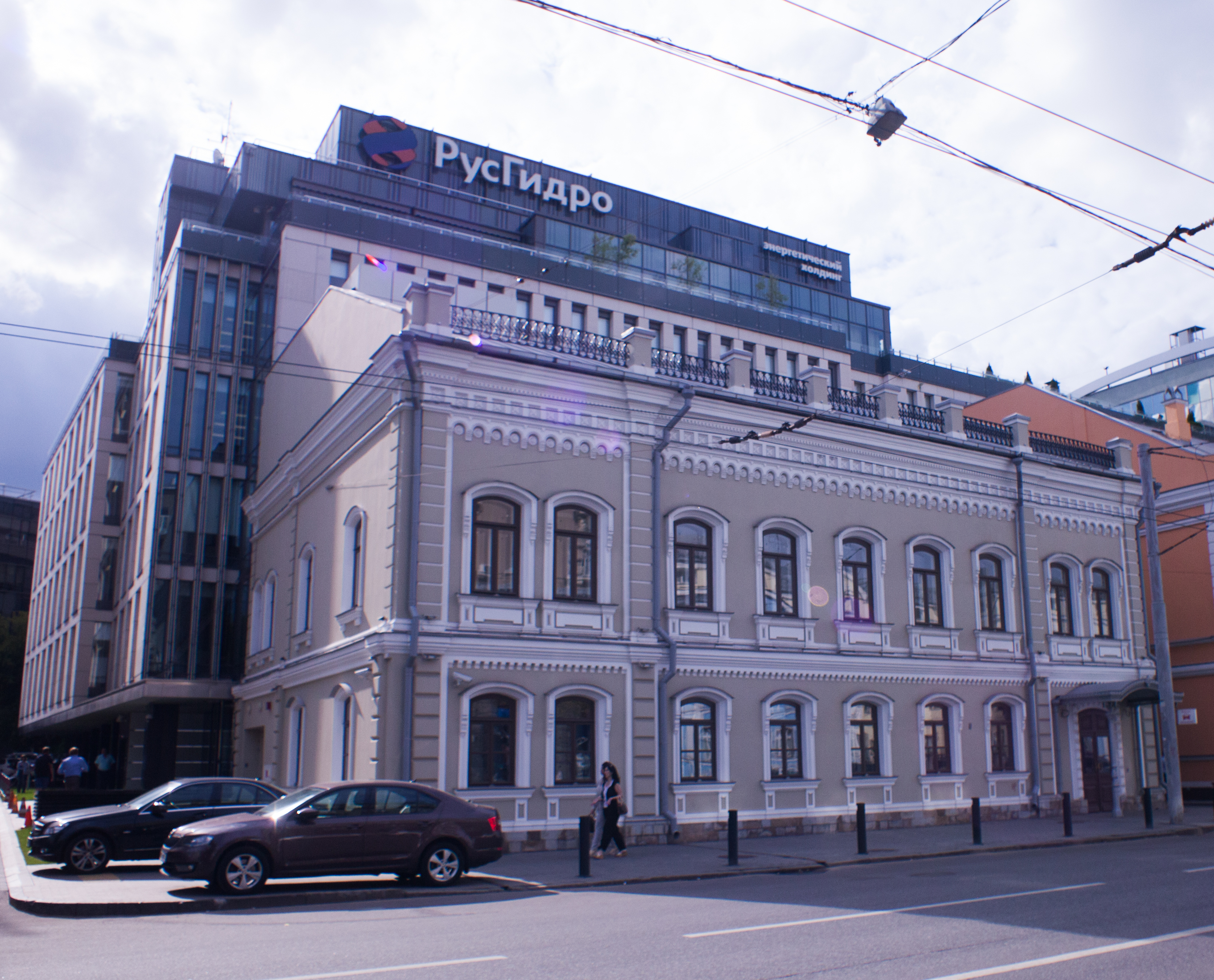
- RusHydro headquarters at Malaya Dmitrovka Street, Moscow (moved to Krasnoyarsk)
- Native name: РусГидро
- Company type: Public (OAO)
- Traded as: MCX: HYDR
- Industry: Electric utility
- Founded: 1993
- Headquarters: Moscow, Russia
- Key people: Viktor Khmarin (CEO); Yury Trutnev (chairman of the board of directors)
- Products: Hydroelectrical power
- Revenue: $5.51 billion (2021)
- Operating income: $778 million (2021)
- Net income: $571 million (2021)
- Total assets: $12.6 billion (2021)
- Total equity: $8.55 billion (2021)
- Owner: Federal Agency for State Property Management (66.8%)
- Number of employees: 69,665 (2018)
- Website: www.rushydro.ru

RusHydro (previous name: Hydro-OGK, Russian: РусГидро) is a Russian hydroelectricity company. As of early 2012, it had a capacity of 34.9 gigawatts. In late 2009, it was the world's second-largest hydroelectric power producer and is the country's largest power-generating company and the largest successor to RAO UES. The partly government-owned conglomerate underwent a major consolidation beginning in July 2007. As of 2011, the head of the company was Evgeny Dod. Its head office is in Obruchevsky District, South-Western Administrative Okrug, Moscow. In 2021, the company's revenue amounted to 190 billion rubles.

== Major power plants ==
- Bureya Dam
- Volga Hydroelectric Station
- Votkinsk Hydroelectric Station
- Dagestan Branch
- Zhiguli Hydroelectric Station
- Zagorskaya PSHPP
- Zeya Dam
- Irganayskaya HPP
- Kabardino-Balkarian Branch
- Kamskaya HPP
- Karachaevo-Cherkessian Branch
- Cascade of Verkhnevolzhskiye HPPs
- Cascade of Kubanskiye HPPs
- Nizhegorodskaya HPP
- Novosibirskaya HPP
- Saratov Hydroelectric Station
- Boguchany Dam
- Sayano-Shushenskaya Dam
- Northern Ossetian Branch
- Cheboksary Dam

=== Performance indicators ===
Generated electricity per year, mln kWh
2006	2007	2008	2009	2010	2011	2012	2013	2014	2015	2016	2017	2018
74 600	82 300	80 273	81 608	71 996	77 008	112 697	129 023	121 947	127 342	138 769	140 248	144 228

Dynamic of capacity of the company hydropower network, Gigawatt
2006	2007	2008	2009	2010	2011	2012	2013	2014	2015	2016	2017	2018
22,70	24,11	24,37	25,42	25,51	26,17	36,50	37,47	38,43	38,65	38,87	39,04	39,4

== Owners and management ==
=== General Directors ===
- Evgeny Dod (November 2009 - September 2015)
- Nikolay Shulginov (September 2015 - November 2020)
- Viktor Khmarin (November 2020 - recent)

== Sanctions ==
On 24 February 2022, in response to the Russian invasion of Ukraine, the United States sanctioned several Russian individuals, entities and financial institutions, including RusHydro.

== See also ==
- Kislaya Guba Tidal Power Station
- 2009 Sayano-Shushenskaya hydro accident
