= Greenhouse gas emissions by Russia =

Greenhouse gas emissions originating from Russia and efforts to reduce them

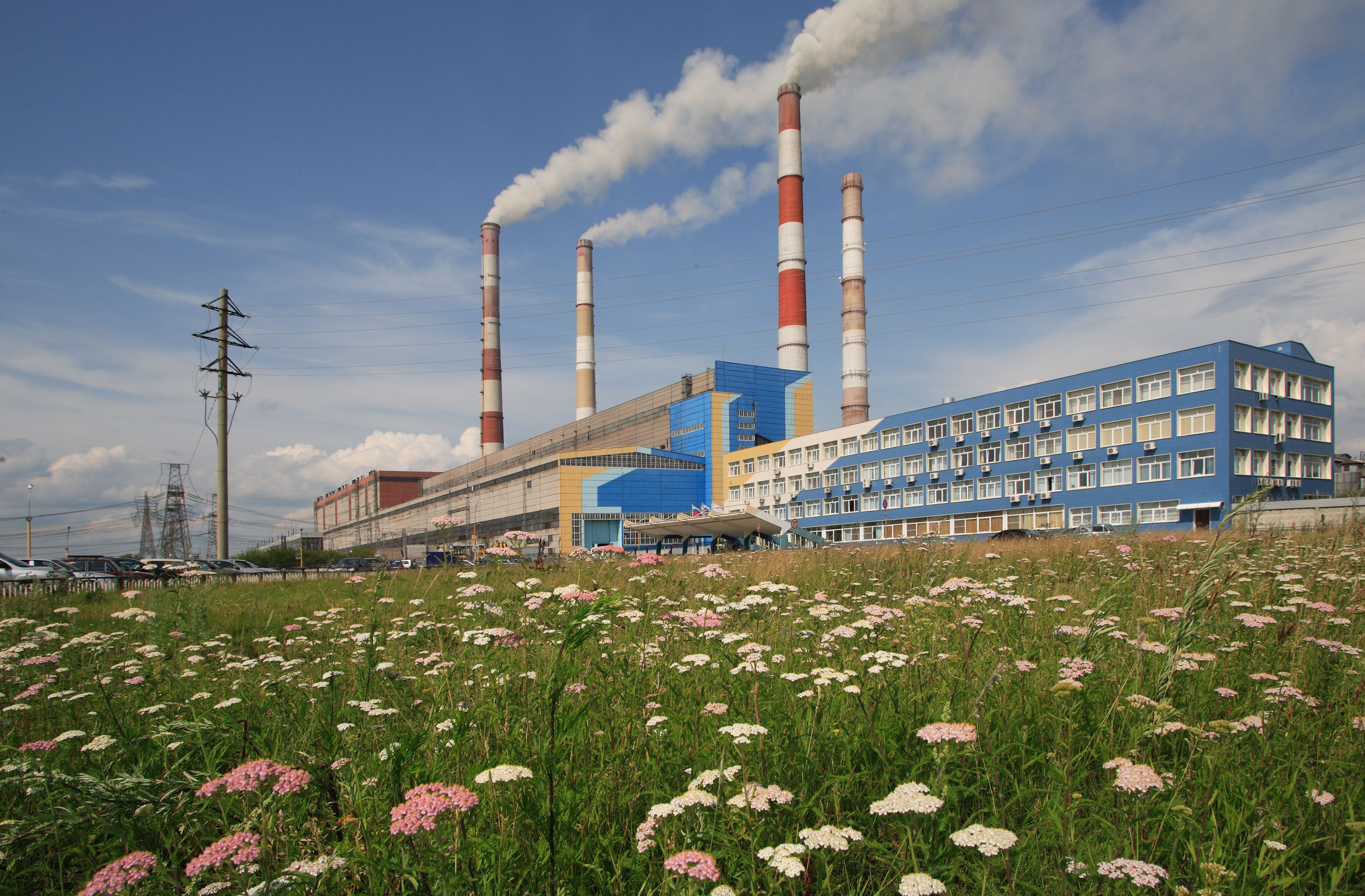
Reftinskaya GRES: the largest coal-fired power station in Russia

Greenhouse gas emissions by Russia are mostly from fossil gas, oil and coal. Russia emits between 2 billion tonnes or 3 billion tonnes carbon dioxide equivalent (CO_{2eq}) of greenhouse gases each year; about 4% of world emissions. Annual per capita carbon dioxide emissions alone are about 12 tons per person, more than double the world average. Cutting greenhouse gas emissions, and therefore air pollution in Russia, would have health benefits greater than the cost. The country is the world's biggest methane emitter, and 4 billion dollars' worth of methane was estimated to leak in 2019/20.

Russia's greenhouse gas emissions decreased by 30% between 1990 and 2018, excluding emissions from land use, land-use change and forestry (LULUCF). Russia's goal is to reach net zero by 2060, but its energy strategy to 2035 is mostly about burning more fossil fuels, and coal is subsidised. Reporting military emissions is voluntary and, as of 2024, no data is available since before the 2022 invasion of Ukraine.

== Sources ==
Since 1850, Russia trails only the United States and China in cumulative contributions of greenhouse gases.

Russia is one of the largest greenhouse gas emitters, both nationally and per person.

Greenhouse gas emissions by Russia have great impact on climate change since the country is the fourth-largest greenhouse gas emitter in the world. Climate Trace estimate that 60% of the country's emissions comes from fossil fuel operations and 24% from the power sector. In 2017, Russia emitted 2155 Mt of CO_{2}, while 578 Mt was reabsorbed by land use, land-use change, and forestry (LULUCF).

2155 Mt of CO_{2} was emitted in 2017 but 578 Mt was reabsorbed by land use, land-use change, and forestry (LULUCF).

Russia electricity production by year. Fossil fuels used in electricity generation is a source of greenhouse gases.

Russia must submit its inventory of 2018 emissions to the UNFCCC by 15 April 2020, and so on for each calendar year.

In 2017, Russia emitted 11.32 tons of CO_{2} per person. But according to the Washington Post methane emissions are under-reported.

=== Energy ===
In 2017 Russia's energy sector, which under IPCC guidelines includes fuel for transport, emitted almost 80% of the country's greenhouse gases. Industrial Processes and Product Use (IPPU) emitted over 10%. The largest emitters are energy industries—mainly electricity generation—followed by fugitive emissions from fuels, and then transport. According to Climate Trace the largest point source is Urengoyskoye gas field at over 150 Mt in 2021.

=== Energy from fossil fuels ===
Most emissions are from the energy sector extracting and burning fossil fuels. The coal industry is state supported.

CO2 emissions by sector, 2021
1. Electricity and heat producers (49.7%)
2. Industry (17.1%)
3. Transport (15.1%)
4. Residential (11.9%)
5. Other energy industries (3.14%)
6. Commercial and public services (1.26%)
7. Final consumption not elsewhere specified (0.91%)
8. Agriculture (0.77%)
9. Fishing (0.11%)

==== Electricity generation ====
Public information from space-based measurements of carbon dioxide by Climate Trace is expected to reveal individual large plants before the 2021 United Nations Climate Change Conference.

===== Gas fired power stations =====
Gas fired power stations are a major source.

=== Agriculture ===
In 2017, agriculture emitted 6% of Russia's greenhouse gases.

=== Waste ===
In 2017, waste emitted 4% of the country's greenhouse gases.

=== Land ===
Russian challenges for forests include control of illegal logging, corruption, forest fires and land use.

As well as trees burning peat burning in wildfires emits carbon. Black carbon on Arctic snow and ice is a problem as it absorbs heat.

== Mitigation ==
=== Energy ===
In 2020, Russia released a draft long-term strategy, to reduce CO_{2} emissions by 33% by 2030 compared to 1990. It did not plan to reach net zero until as late as 2100. Reducing methane leaks would help, as Russia is the largest methane emitter.

=== Industry ===
Efforts to decarbonize steel and aluminium production were delayed by the Russo-Ukrainian war and international sanctions during the 2022 Russian invasion of Ukraine.

=== Economics ===
Decarbonization in China, such as increasing use of solar power and electric vehicles, may eventually reduce Chinese demand for Russian oil and gas.

=== Carbon sinks ===
Carbon sinks, which in Russia consist mainly of forests, offset about a quarter of national emissions in 2017.

== See also ==
- Climate Doctrine of the Russian Federation
- Energy policy of Russia
- Greenhouse gas inventory
- List of countries by carbon dioxide emissions
- Plug-in electric vehicles in Russia
