= Coal in Russia =

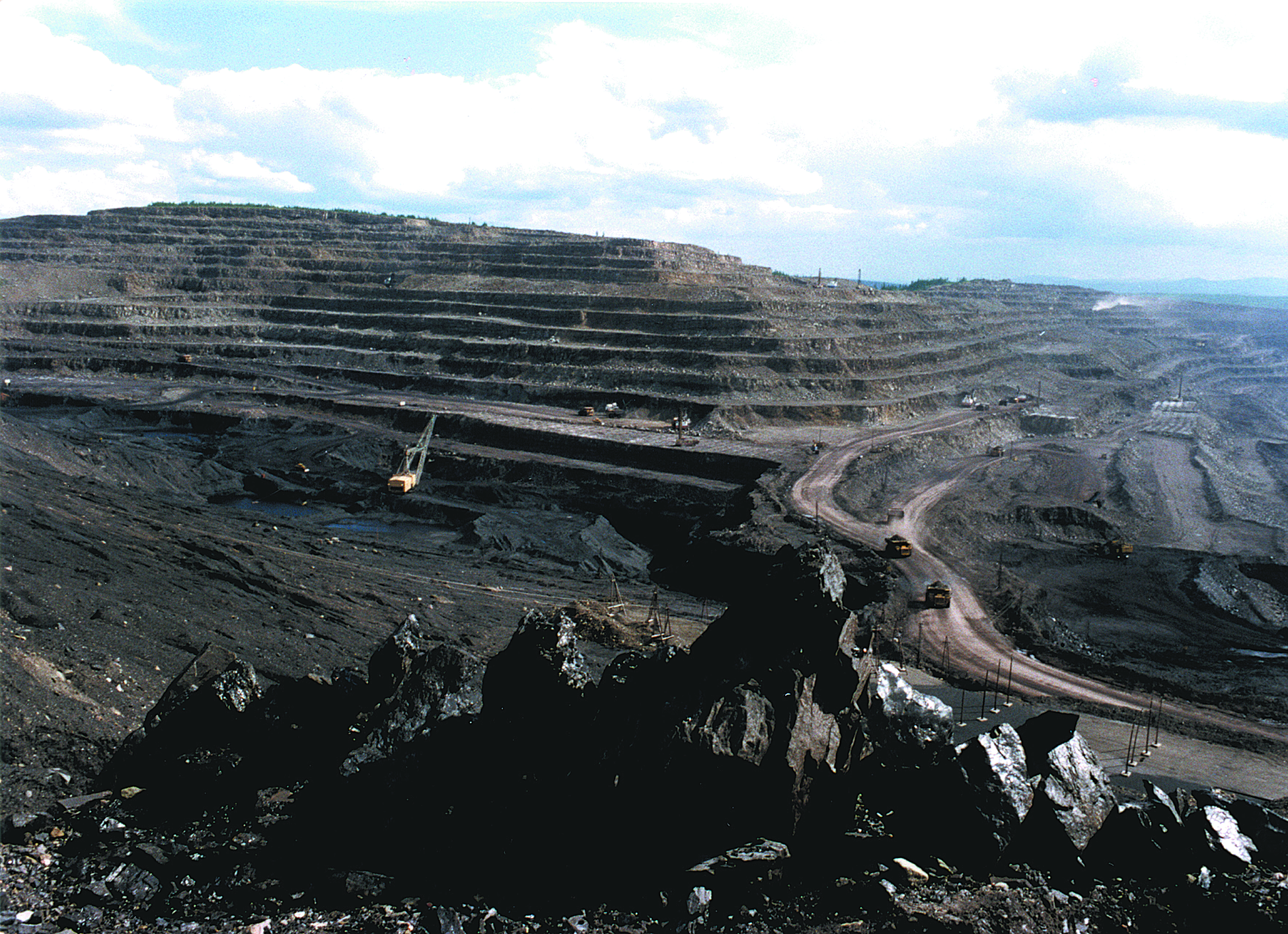
Neryungrinsky coal mine (WR)

Coal is an important part of Russia's energy system. From August 2024 to July 2025, fossil fuels (coal and gas) made up about 63.9% of electricity generation. Coal made up about 18% of this, and gas made up about 45%. Earlier estimates put coal's share of the total energy supply at about 16%, but its ongoing use in making electricity shows how important it still is. But the Russian coal industry is in a lot of trouble financially and structurally. Exports to Europe have fallen sharply (Europe's share of Russian coal exports fell to about 13% in 2024), and shipments to China and other Asian markets are having trouble with tariffs and logistics. In early 2025, the government put in place support measures like tax deferrals and debt restructuring to help companies that were having trouble. Despite these efforts, the sector has experienced large losses, reflecting weak prices, sanctions, and competition. Globally, coal demand reached record levels in 2024, but growth is slowing, while domestically, coal mining and use continue to contribute significantly to air and water pollution, methane emissions, and climate change.

== Coal production ==
The major areas of coal production are the Moscow Basin, Pechora, Kuznetsk, Kansk-Achinsk, Irkutsk and South Yakutsk basins. Over two-thirds of coal produced in Russia is used domestically.

Year	Coal Production (Million tons)
1988	425
1990	395
1995	263
1998	232
2000	258
2003	277
2004	284
2005	300
2006	309
2008	329
2009	323
2010	323
2011	338
2012	355
2013	352
2014	359
2015	374
2016	386
2017	411
2018	439
2019	441
2020	402
2021	438.4
2022	443.6
2023	438
2024	427

== Coal consumption ==
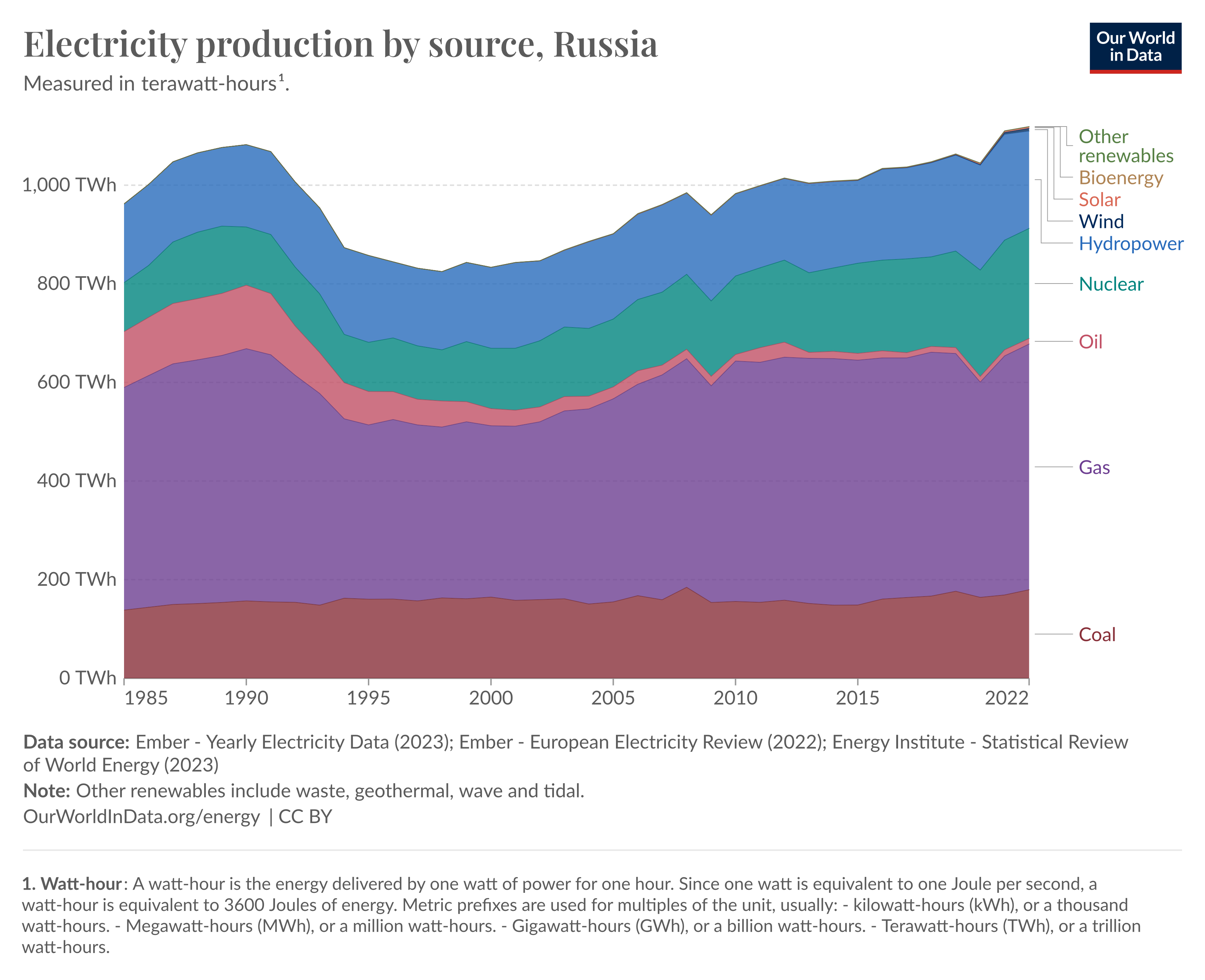
Share of electricity production by source

Russia is self-sufficient in coal and consumed approximately 258 million tons in 2023. In 2024, coal consumption declined significantly to about 178 million tons, reflecting reduced industrial demand and a continued shift toward alternative energy sources. The percentage of coal in Russian electricity generation has been steadily decreasing since 1990, when it accounted for 20.7% of the mix, largely due to the rising use of natural gas, nuclear, and hydroelectric power. In 2023, coal contributed about 17% of electricity generation, down from 18% in 2022. In 2024, this share further declined to an estimated 15%. Russia's installed coal-fired power generation capacity remained steady at around 40 gigawatts (GW) through both years. By 2025, the share of coal in electricity generation is expected to drop to approximately 14%, driven by energy diversification policies, improved efficiency in other energy sectors, and international climate commitments.

== Pollution ==
Coal mining is damaging health and the environment. Some greenhouse gas emissions by Russia are from coal. Carbon capture and storage is not cost effective.

CO2 emissions by fuel, 2021
1. Natural Gas (52.5%)
2. Coal (25.9%)
3. Oil (18.9%)
4. Other (2.82%)

Russia, known for its extensive use of coal, is one of the world's top greenhouse gas emitters. The country maintains the world's seventh-largest fleet of coal-fired power stations, which significantly contribute to its carbon emissions. This reliance on coal is particularly impactful because the vast majority of CO_{2} emissions in the energy sector come from the burning of fossil fuels such as coal, oil, and natural gas for power generation or to fuel vehicles and machines. Despite Russia's investments in renewable energy and nuclear power, the persistent dependence on coal challenges its ability to combat climate change effectively. Many of Russia's heavy industries are coal-dependent, further complicating the nation's efforts to achieve its announced goal of carbon neutrality by 2060. It is essential for Russia to reduce its reliance on coal and amplify its investment in green technologies to mitigate its environmental impact and meet its climate targets.

== Exports ==
Most Russian coal exports go to Asian countries, with China being the largest market with a quarter of exports. Coal power plants in Turkey, such as Emba Hunutlu, which burn imported coal prefer Russian because it is cheaper than imports from other countries.

The significant reliance on rail transport is evident as about 28% of Russian rail cargo was coal as of 2023. However, the limited eastbound rail infrastructure from the Kuzbass region, a major coal-mining area, to the Pacific Ocean often leads to congestion and delays. This congestion is particularly problematic given the high demand from Asian markets.

To address these challenges, in 2023, the capacity of Russia's eastern railways was reported at 185 million short tons, with an estimated throughput of 90% (166 million short tons). The Russian government has recognized the need for improvement and plans to increase the capacity of eastbound railways to 231 million short tons by 2030, with an intermediate target of 198 million short tons by 2025. This expansion is crucial to better meet the increasing demand from Asian countries and ensure more efficient delivery of coal exports.

In 2024 the International Energy Agency said: "Russian coal trade has faced increasing difficulties in 2024 amid Western sanctions, infrastructure disruptions and profitability issues, with total exports expected to have decreased by 6%." and "Russian exports saw a significant shift to the east during 2023, following the EU ban on Russian coal imports in 2022. While two‑thirds of Russian exports were directed to Asian markets in 2022, this share surged to about 84% during 2023."

== History ==
Russia remains one of the top coal-producing countries globally, ranking sixth in the world. In 2023, it produced around 438 million tons of coal, which accounted for roughly 6% of global coal production. However, this is part of a long and fluctuating trend. After the collapse of the Soviet Union in the early 1990s and the shift to a market-based economy, Russia's coal output declined sharply—from its peak of over 425 million tons in the late 1980s down to just 232 million tons by the end of the decade.

As the Russian economy began recovering following the 1998 Russian financial crisis, coal production gradually picked up. Yet, it never fully returned to Soviet-era levels, with a post-Soviet peak of about 329 million tons reached in 2008. The 2008 financial crisis, combined with falling coal prices, triggered another dip in output. While coal prices showed signs of recovery in the early 2010s, it was actually the weakening of the ruble that helped boost Russia's coal exports, making them more affordable on the international market despite global price fluctuations.

By 2024, however, production had slightly decreased to around 427 million tons, partly due to export challenges, Western sanctions, and infrastructure constraints. While Russia still has vast coal reserves, the industry's future is uncertain as global demand shifts and environmental concerns grow.

=== Personal ranks and rank insignia ===
In 1947, personal ranks were introduced for the personnel of the coal industry and mining construction, as well as uniforms with rank insignia on the collar patches of tunics, jackets, great coats, and summer blouses. The personal ranks were abolished in 1954, for the coal industry and mining construction, as well as for most other civilian departments and agencies.

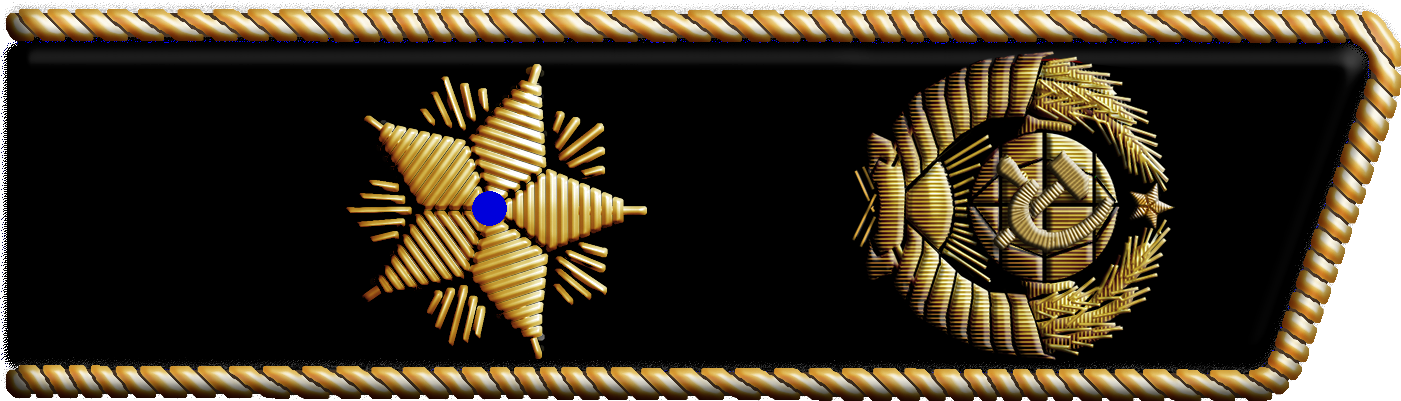
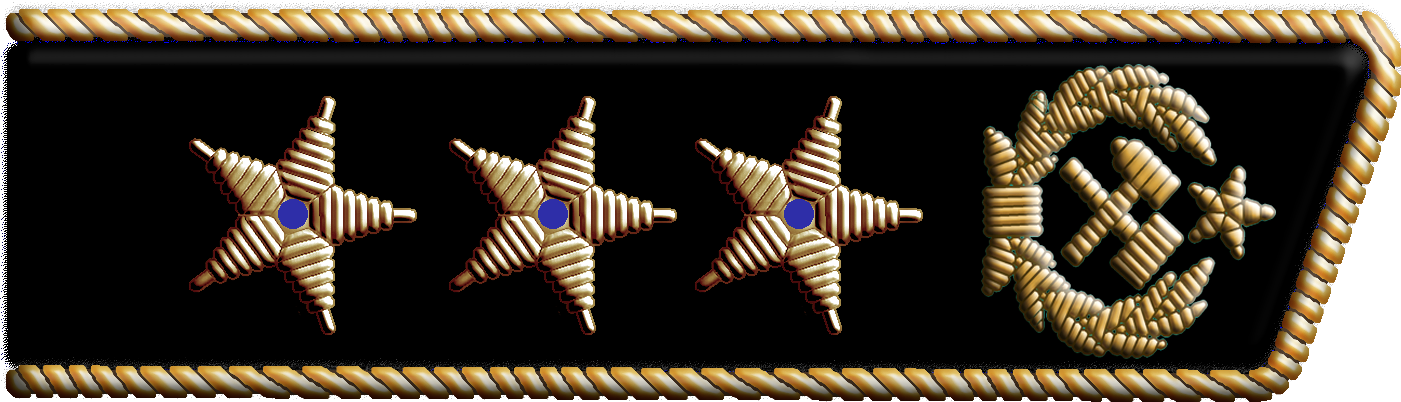
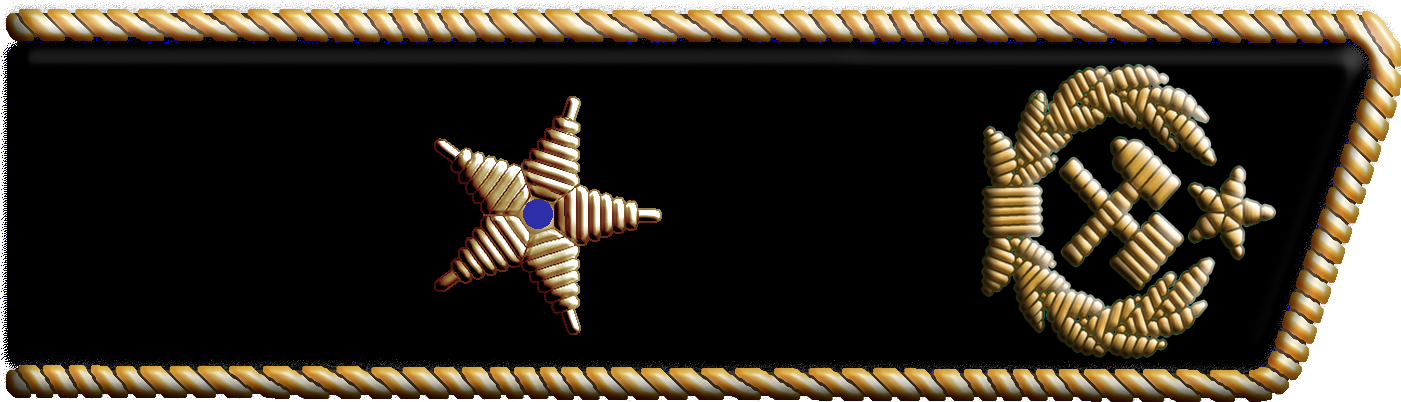
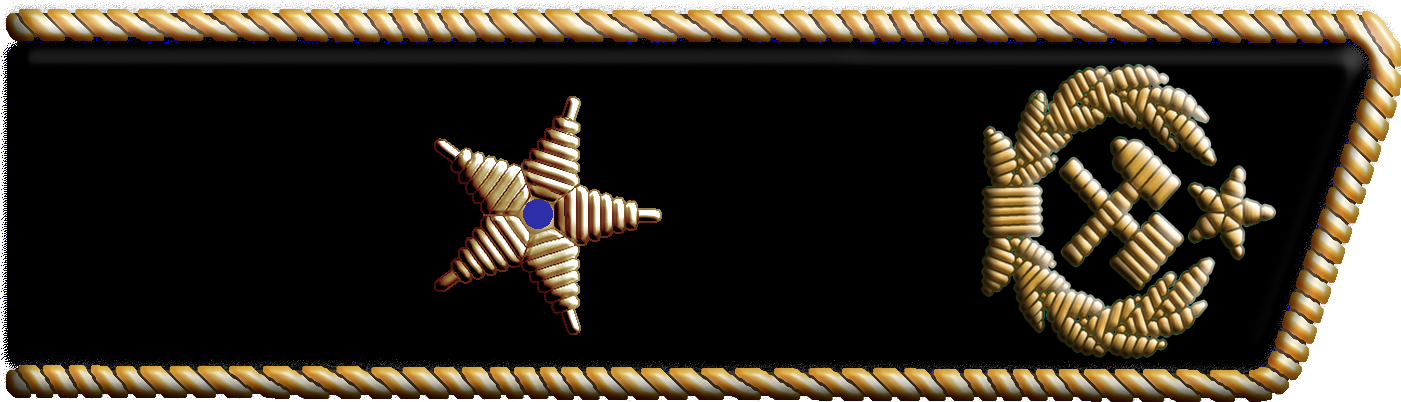
	HIGHER ENGINEERING AND MANAGEMENT STAFF
Collar patches
Personal ranks	Director general of the coal industry	Director general of mining, first class	Director general of mining, second class	Director general of mining, third class

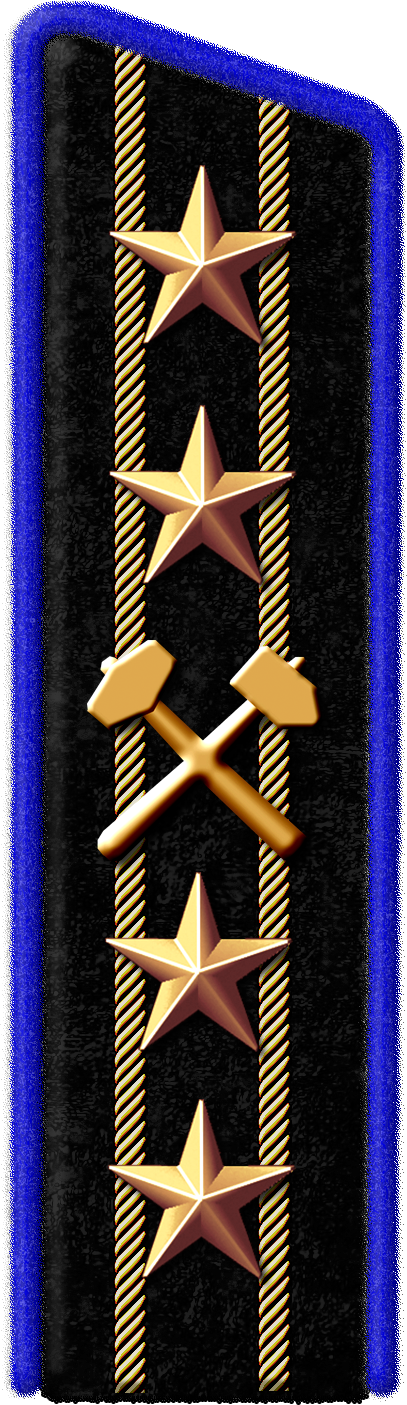
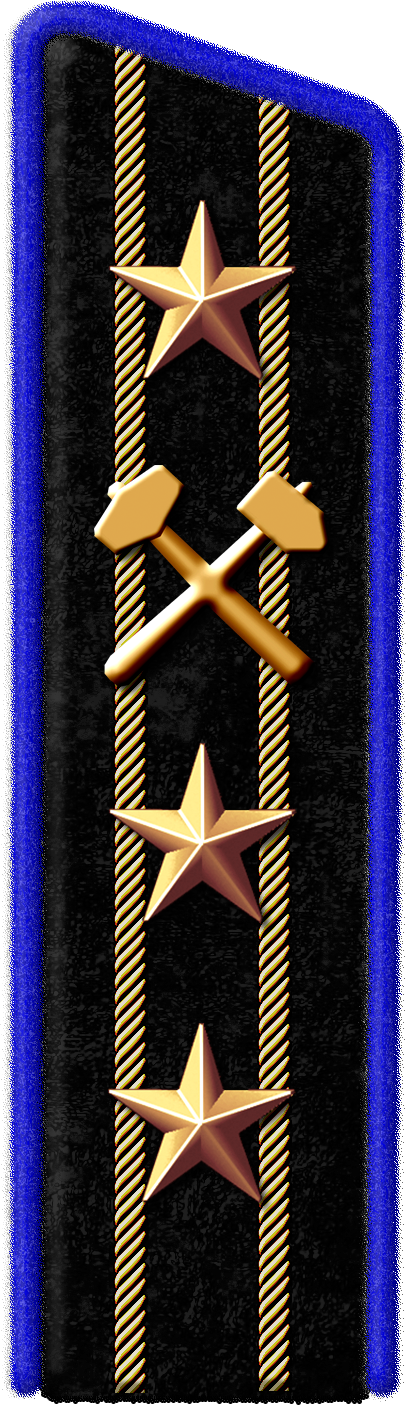
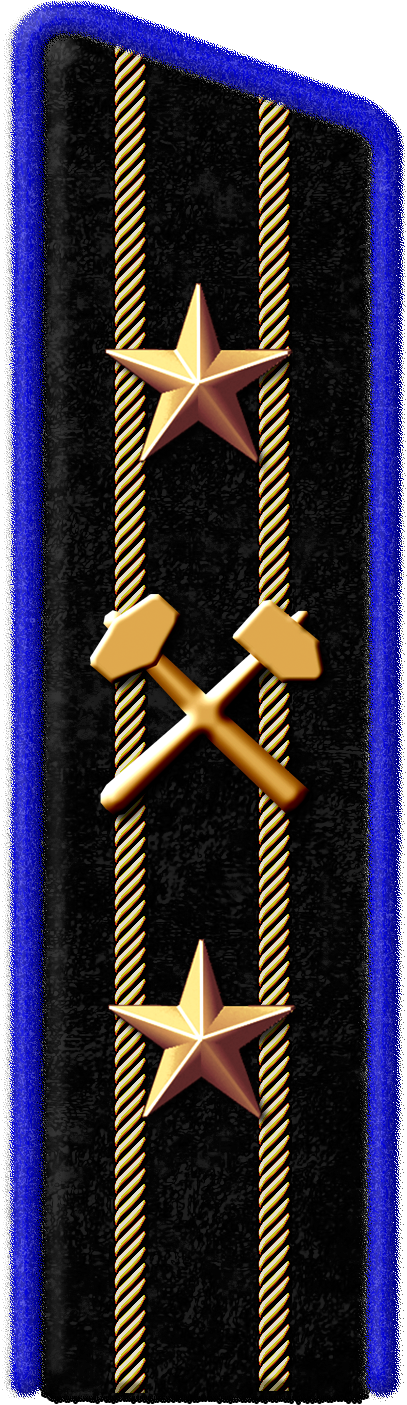
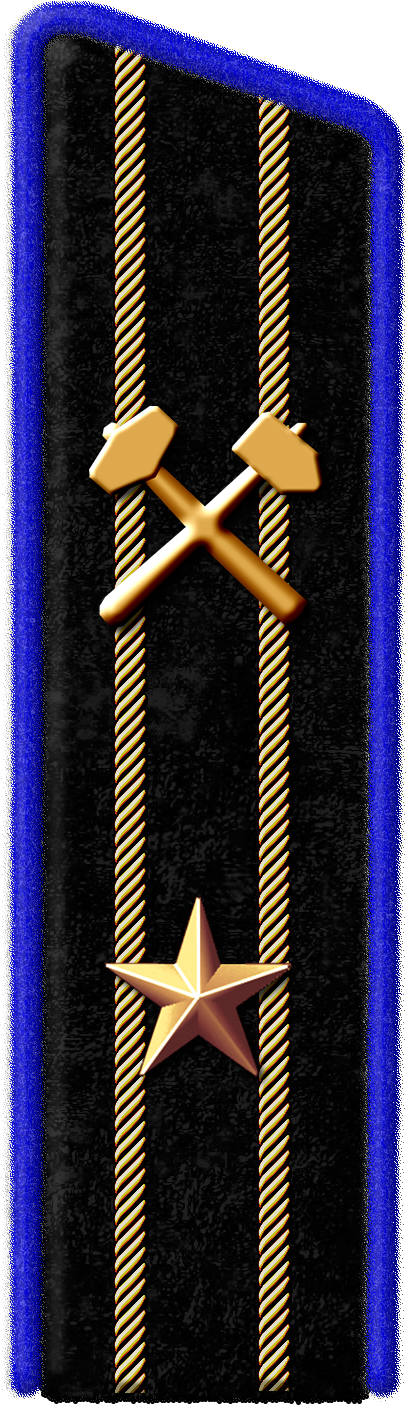
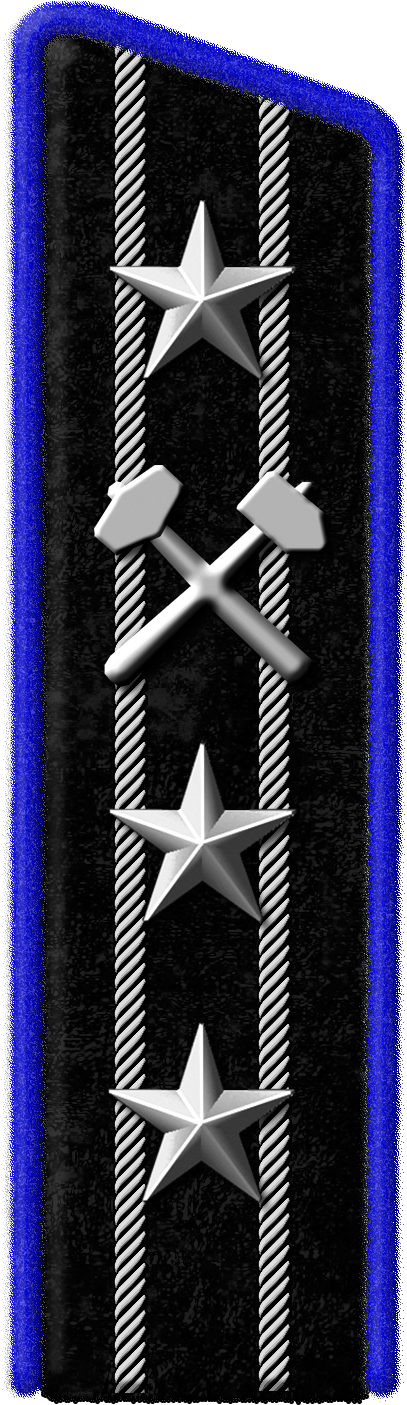
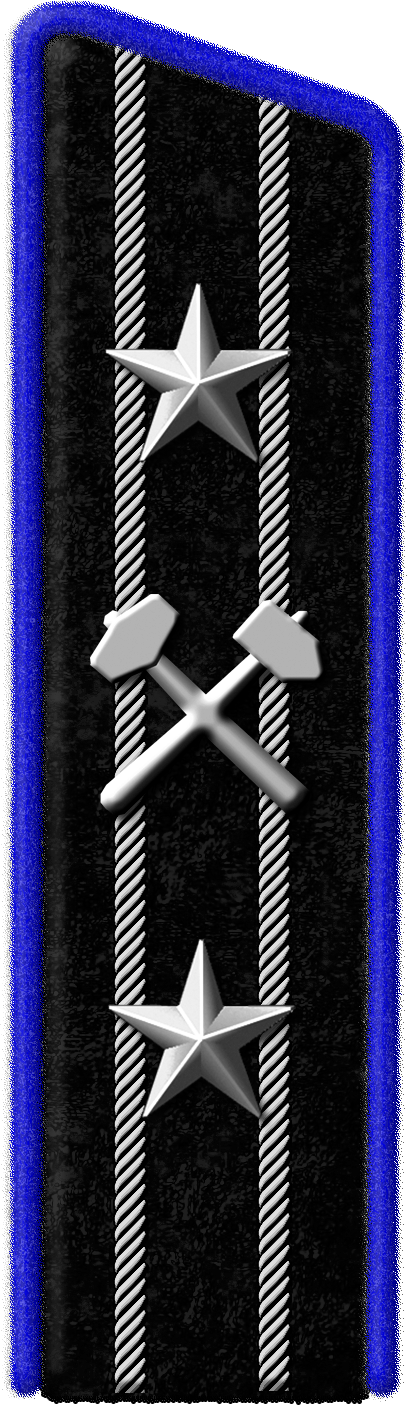
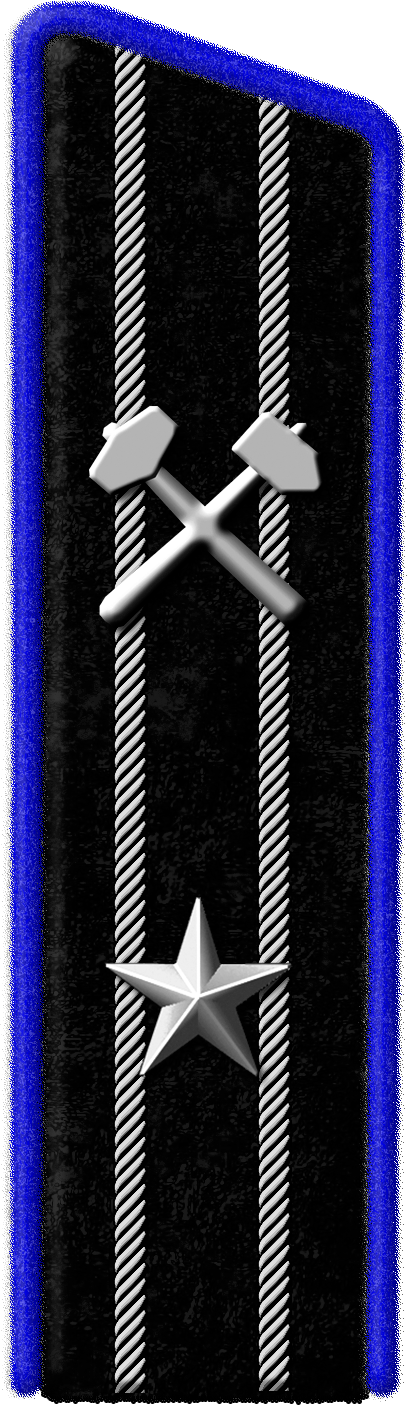
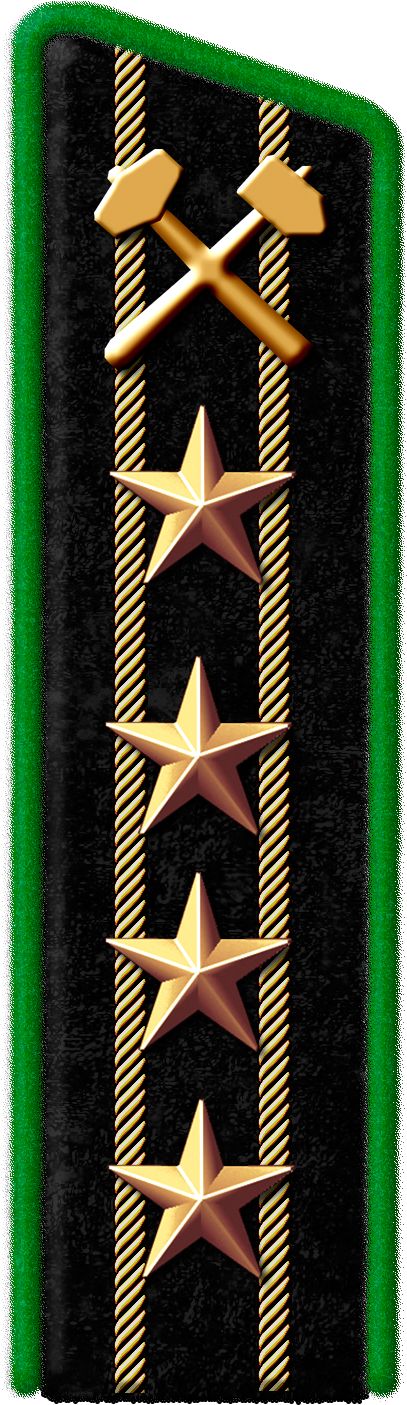
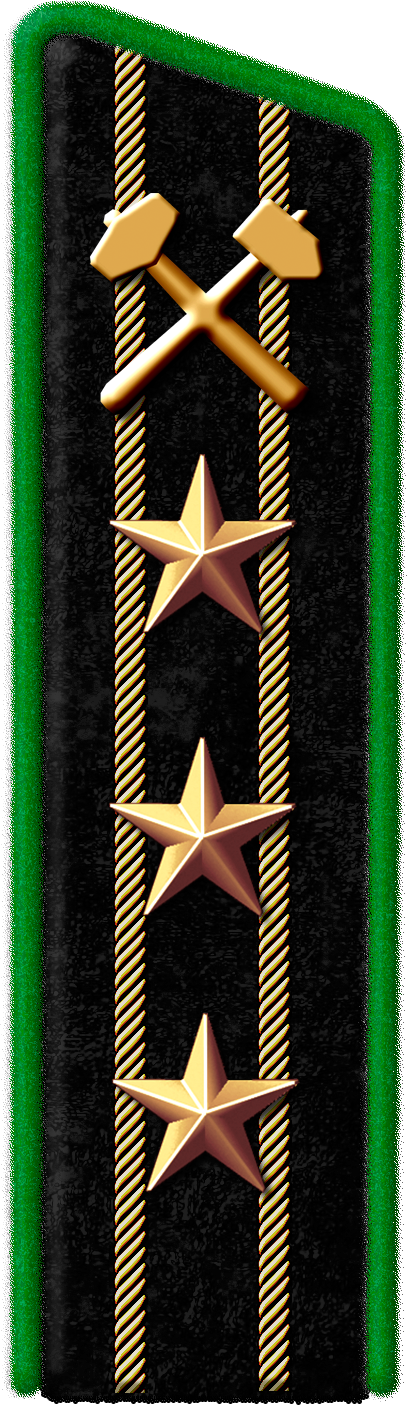
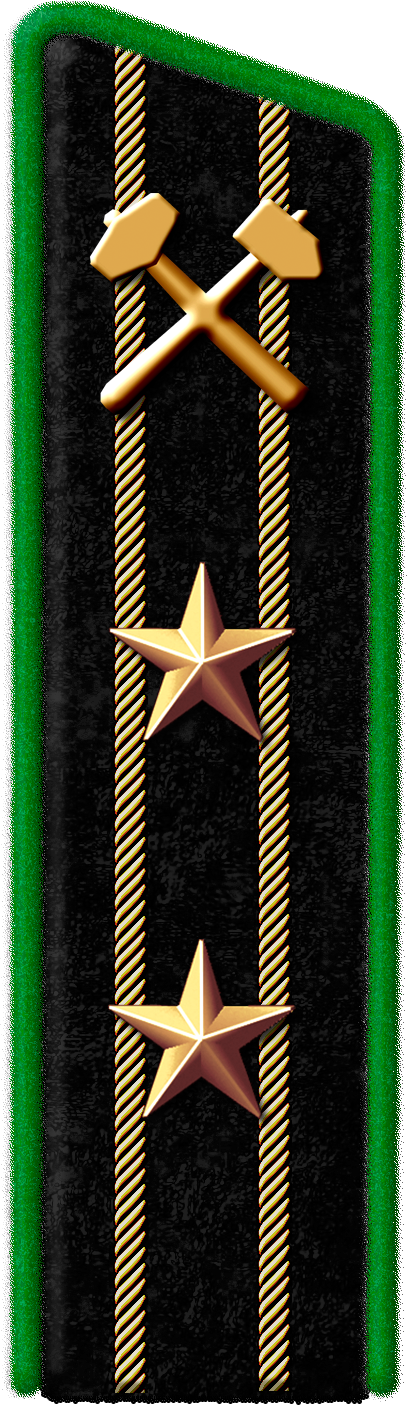
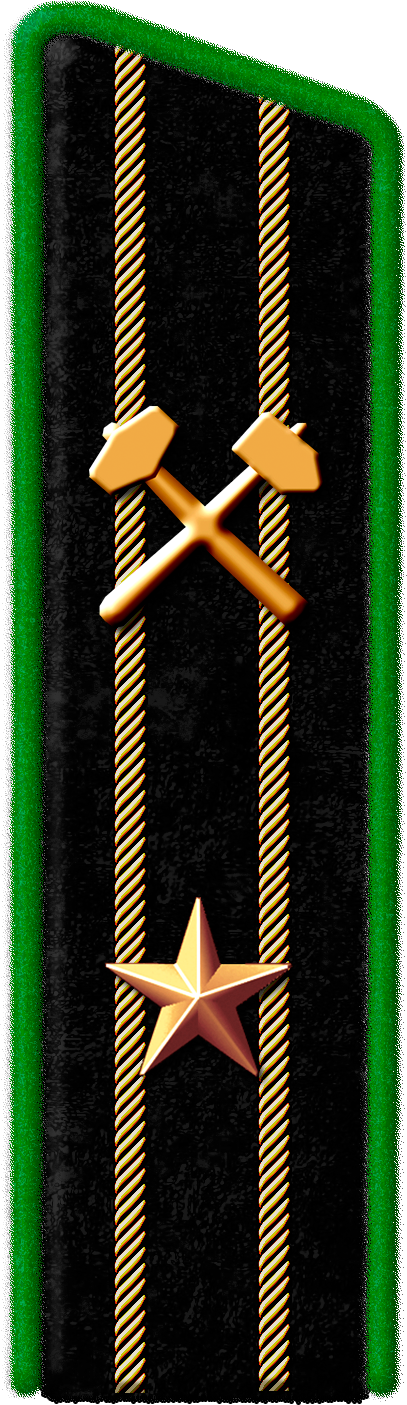
	SENIOR ENGINEERING AND MANAGEMENT STAFF
Collar patches
Branch	Technical
Collar patches
Branch	Administrative
Collar patches
Branch	Government Mining Inspection
Personal ranks	Mining director	Mining director, first class	Mining director, second class	Mining director, third class

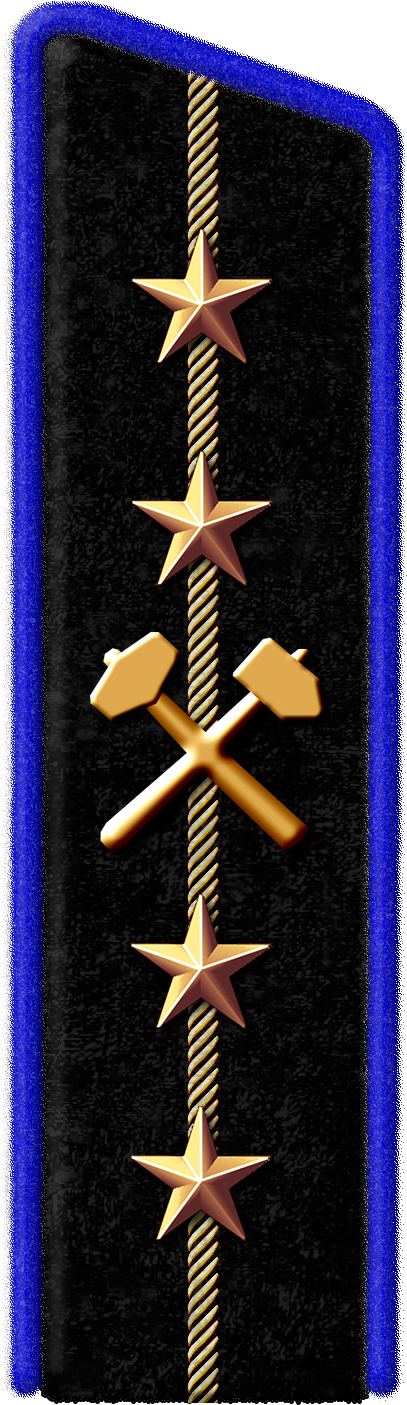
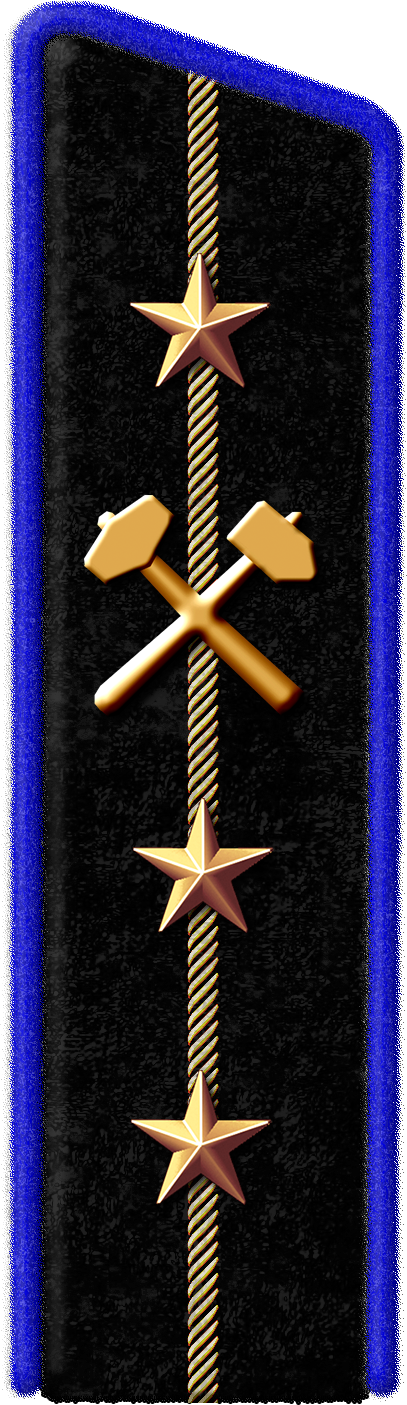
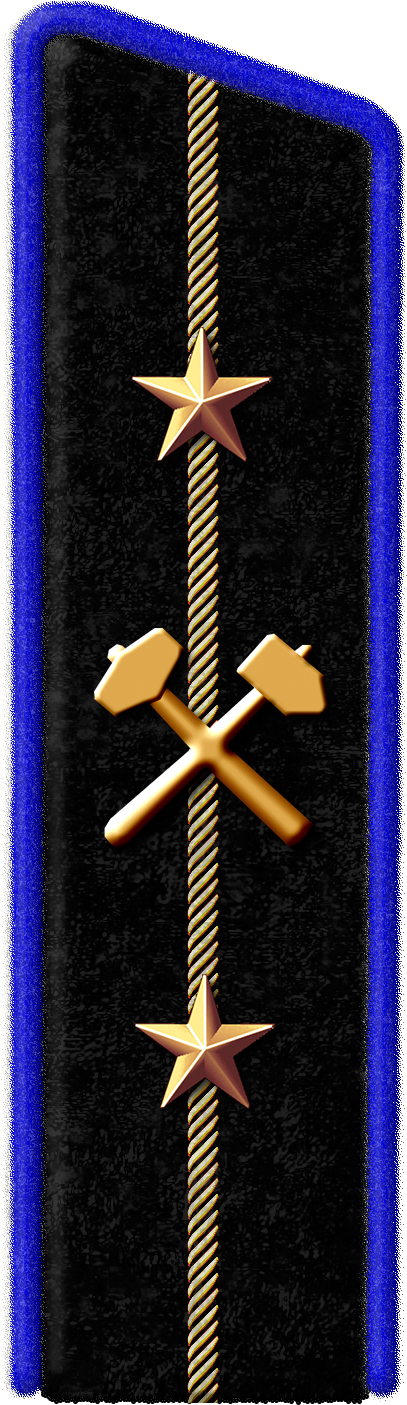
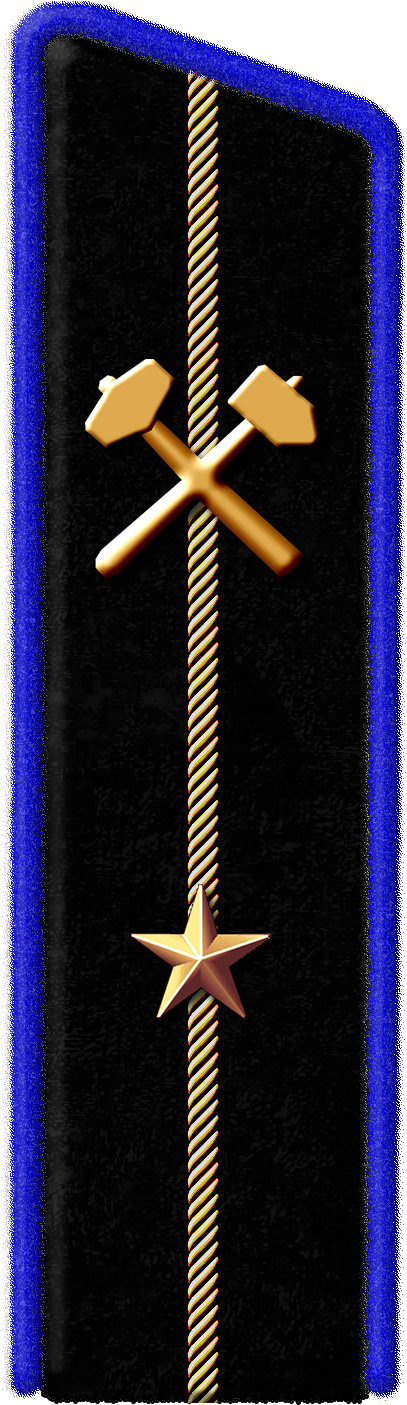
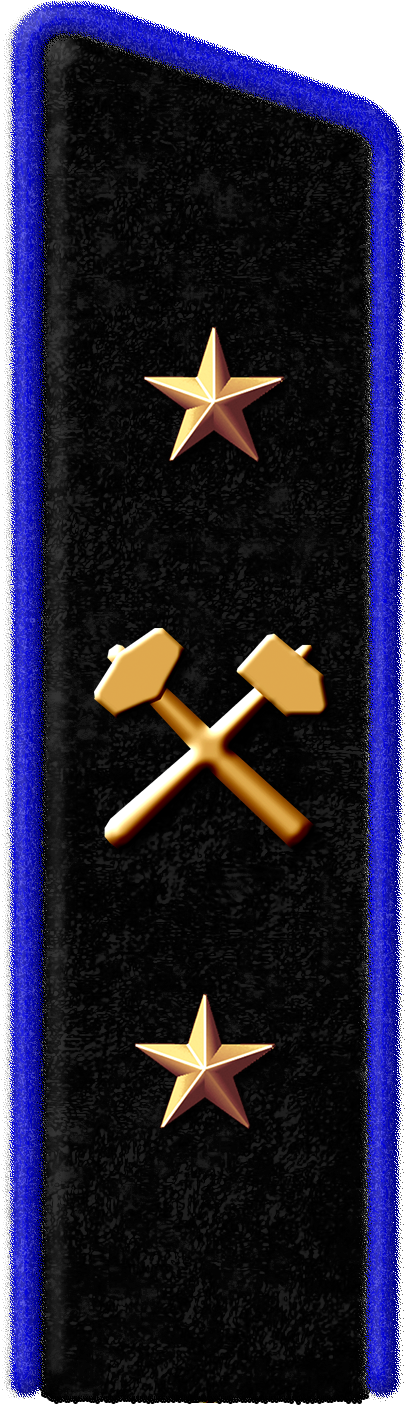
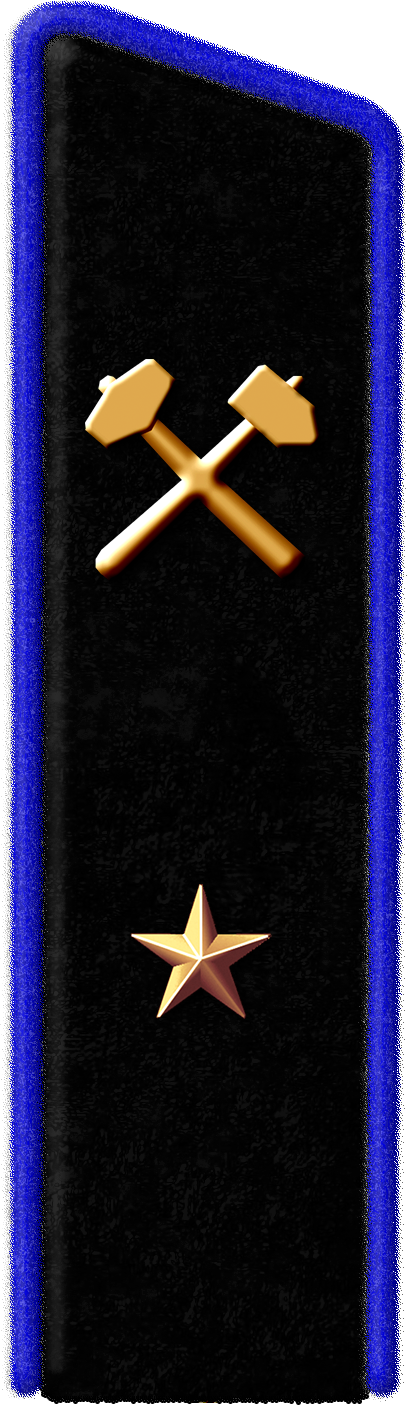
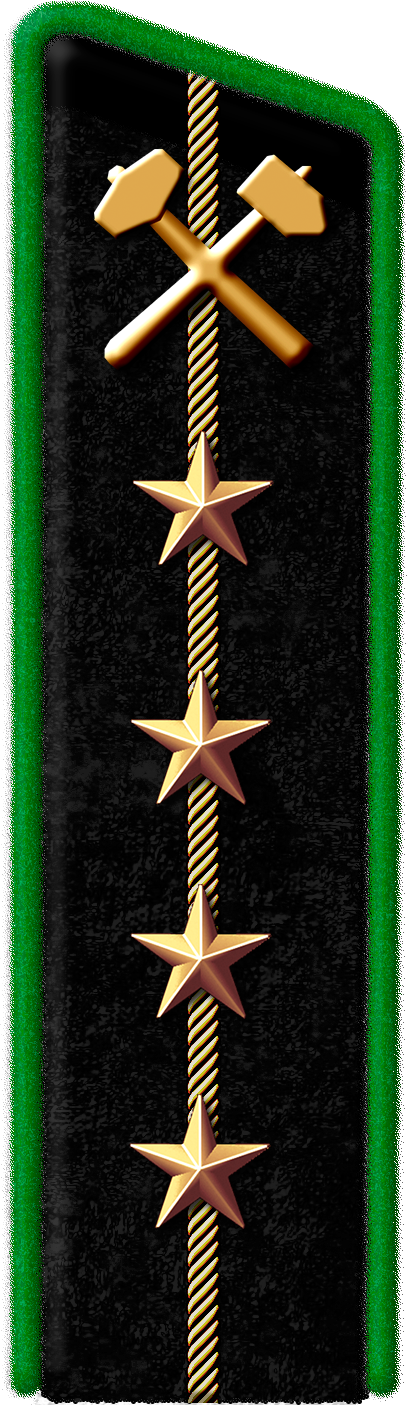
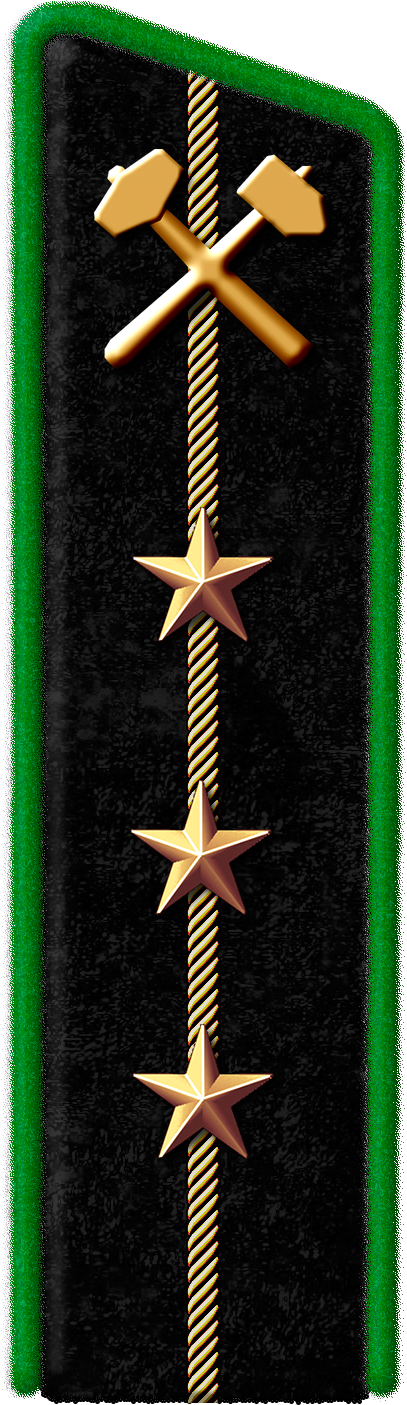
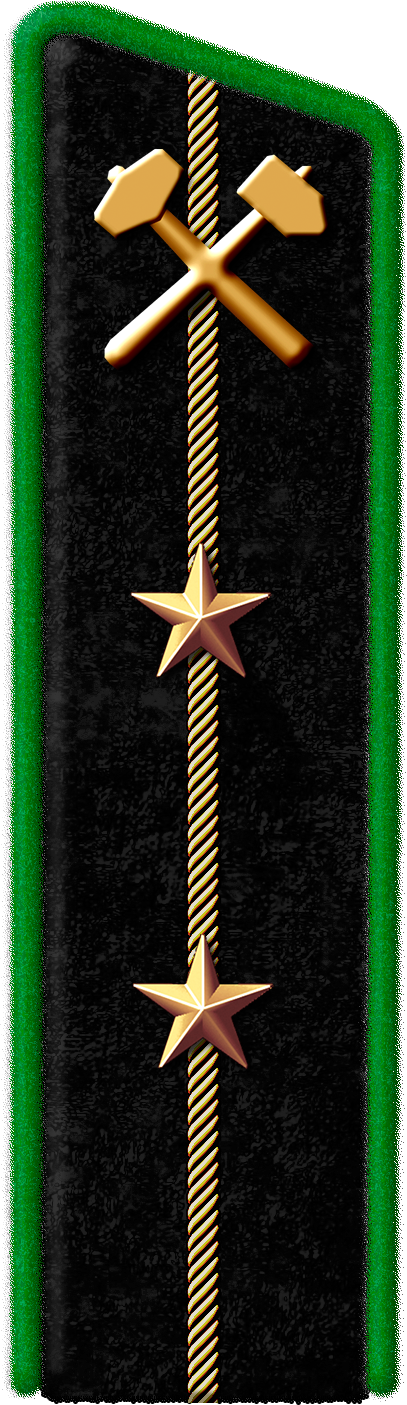
	MIDDLE ENGINEERING AND MANAGEMENT STAFF
Collar patches
Branch	Technical
Collar patches
Branch	Government Mining Inspection
Personal ranks	Mining engineer, first class	Mining engineer, second class	Mining engineer, third class	Mining technician, first class	Mining technician, second class	Mining technician, third class

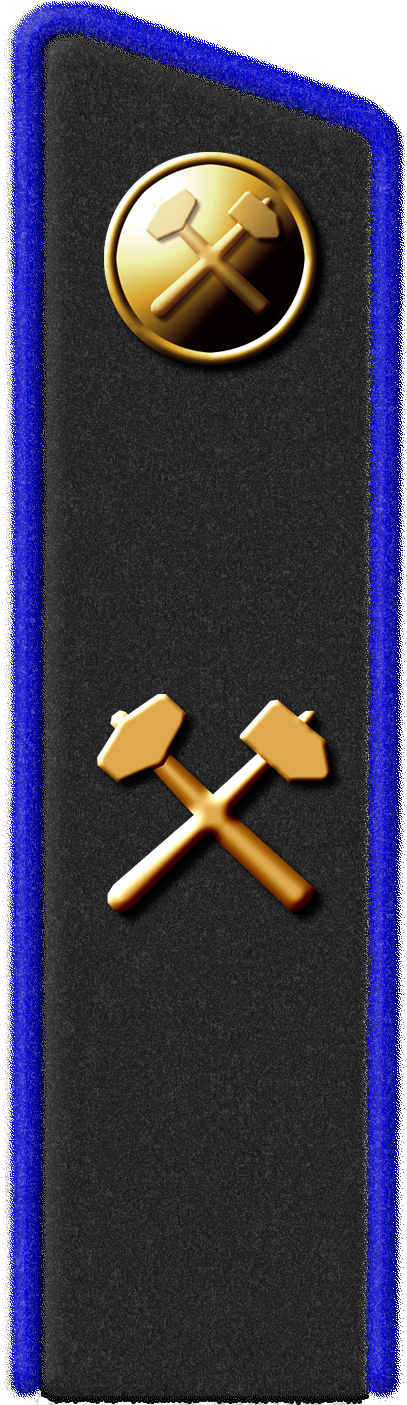
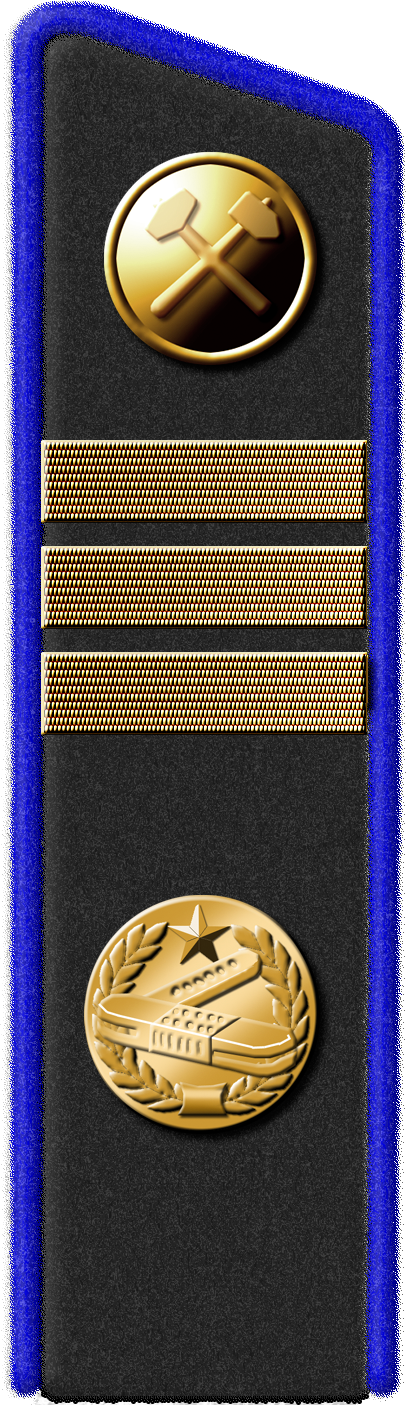
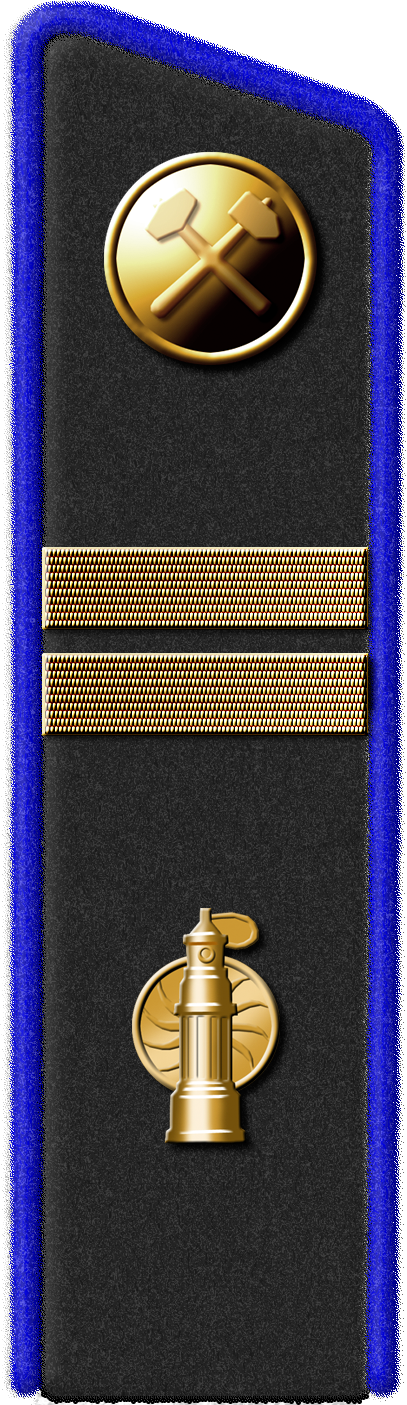
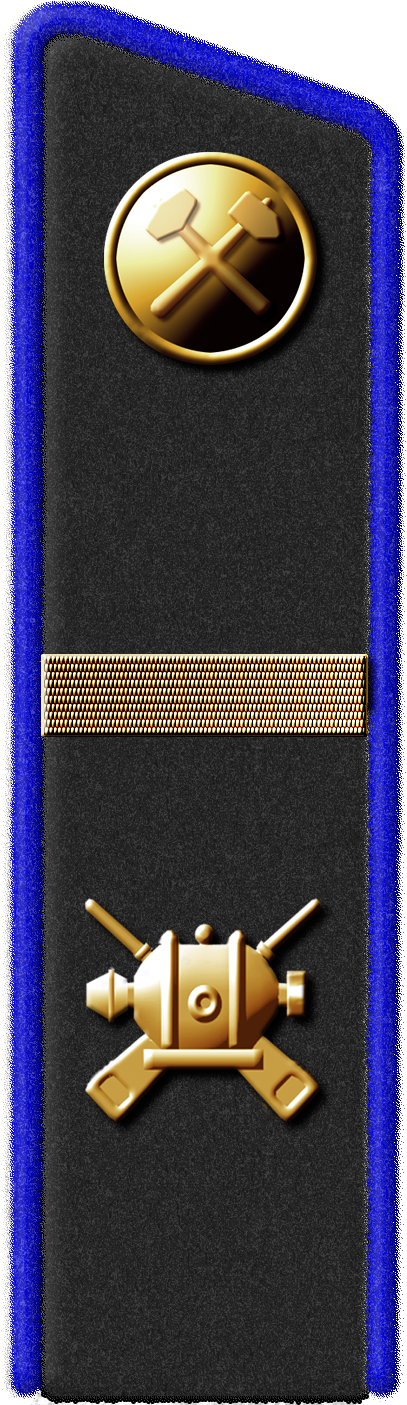
	JUNIOR ENGINEERING AND MANAGEMENT STAFF
Collar patches
Personal ranks	Junior mining technician	Senior mining master	Mining master, first grade	Mining mastern second grade

== See also ==
- Climate change in Russia
- Energy policy of Russia
- Nuclear power in Russia
- Renewable energy in Russia
