= Energy in Russia =

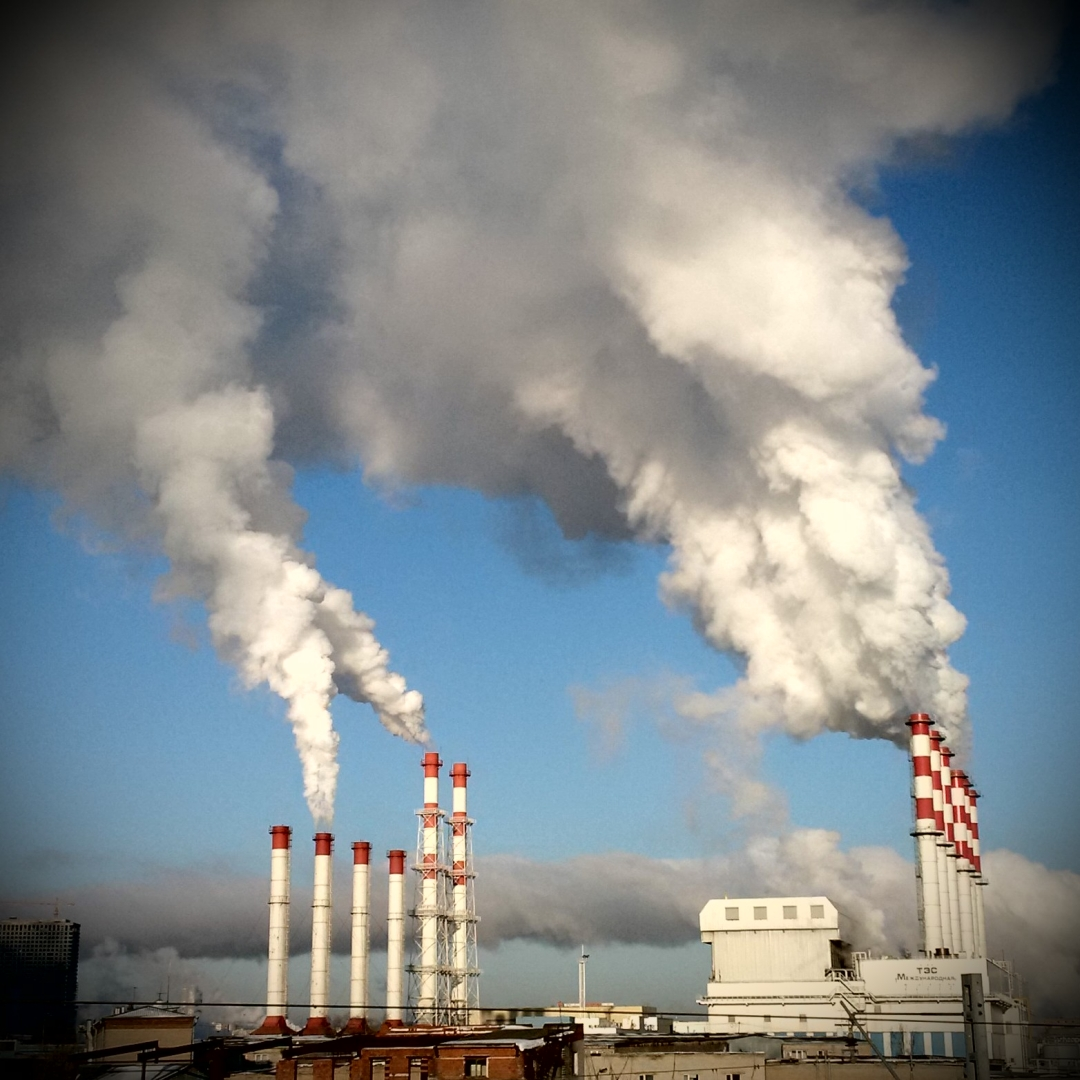
2nd Magistralnaya Street powerplants in Moscow

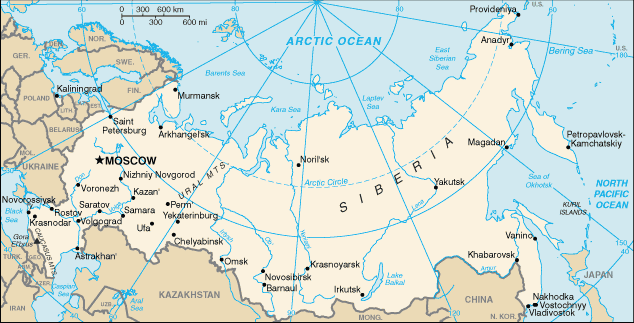
Map of Russia

Over half the energy in Russia is from fossil gas and almost a quarter from oil.

Energy consumption across Russia in 2023 was 1,162.44TWh. Russia is a leading global exporter of oil and natural gasand is the fourth highest greenhouse emitter in the world. In 2019 Russia adopted the Paris Agreement. Although Russia aims to be carbon neutral by 2060, its assumptions on its greenhouse gas emissions from fossil fuels being absorbed by forests have been questioned.

== Overview ==
Development of CO2 emissions

Russia was widely described as an energy superpower. It has the world's largest proven gas reserves, the second-largest coal reserves, the eighth-largest oil reserves, and the largest oil shale reserves in Europe. Russia is also a natural gas exporter, the second-largest natural gas producer, the second-largest oil producer and exporter,and the third-largest coal exporter. Russia's oil and gas production led to deep economic relationships with the European Union, China, and former Soviet and Eastern Bloc states. During the 2010s, Russia's share of supplies to total European Union (including the United Kingdom) gas demand grew from 25% in 2009 to 32% in the weeks before the Russian invasion of Ukraine in February 2022. Russia relies heavily on revenues from oil- and gas-related taxes and export tariffs, which accounted for 45% of its federal budget in January 2022. However, after the invasion of Ukraine, the EU countries sanctioned Russian fossil fuels and reduced their imports of them. This forced Russia to reorient exports towards Asia.

Russia is the world's fourth-largest electricity producer. It was also the world's first country to develop civilian nuclear power, and constructed the world's first nuclear power plant. Russia was also the world's fourth-largest nuclear energy producer in 2019, and was the fifth-largest hydroelectric producer in 2021.

Due to effects from the Russian invasion of Ukraine Russia's revenues from oil product exports had in August 2025 declined to five-year lows, contributing to Russia's economic slowdown. Acknowledging Russia's strained energy system president Vladimir Putin pointed in September 2025 to Russia's coal reserves to offset its gas shortage, insufficient infrastructure and under-developed grid economy.

== Energy sources ==
Russia is rich in energy resources. Russia has the largest known natural gas reserves of any state on earth, along with the second largest coal reserves, and the eighth largest oil reserves. This is 32% of world proven natural gas reserves (23% of the probable reserves), 12% of the proven oil reserves, 10% of the explored coal reserves (14% of the estimated reserves) and 8% of the proven uranium reserves.

=== Natural gas ===
Russia is the world's second largest producer of natural gas, and has the world's largest gas reserves. Russia used to be the world's largest gas exporter. Gazprom and Novatek are Russia's main gas producers, but many Russian oil companies, including Rosneft, also operate gas production facilities. Gazprom, which is state-owned, is the largest gas producer, but its share of production has declined over the past decade, as Novatek and Rosneft have expanded their production capacity. However, Gazprom still accounted for 68% of Russian gas production in 2021. Historically, production was concentrated in West Siberia, but investment has shifted in the past decade to Yamal and Eastern Siberia and the Far East, as well as the offshore Arctic.

Russia also has a gas export pipeline network, including Power of Siberia to China and one sending gas directly into Europe, TurkStream. Russia natural gas in 2021 accounted for 45% of imports and almost 40% of European Union gas demand.

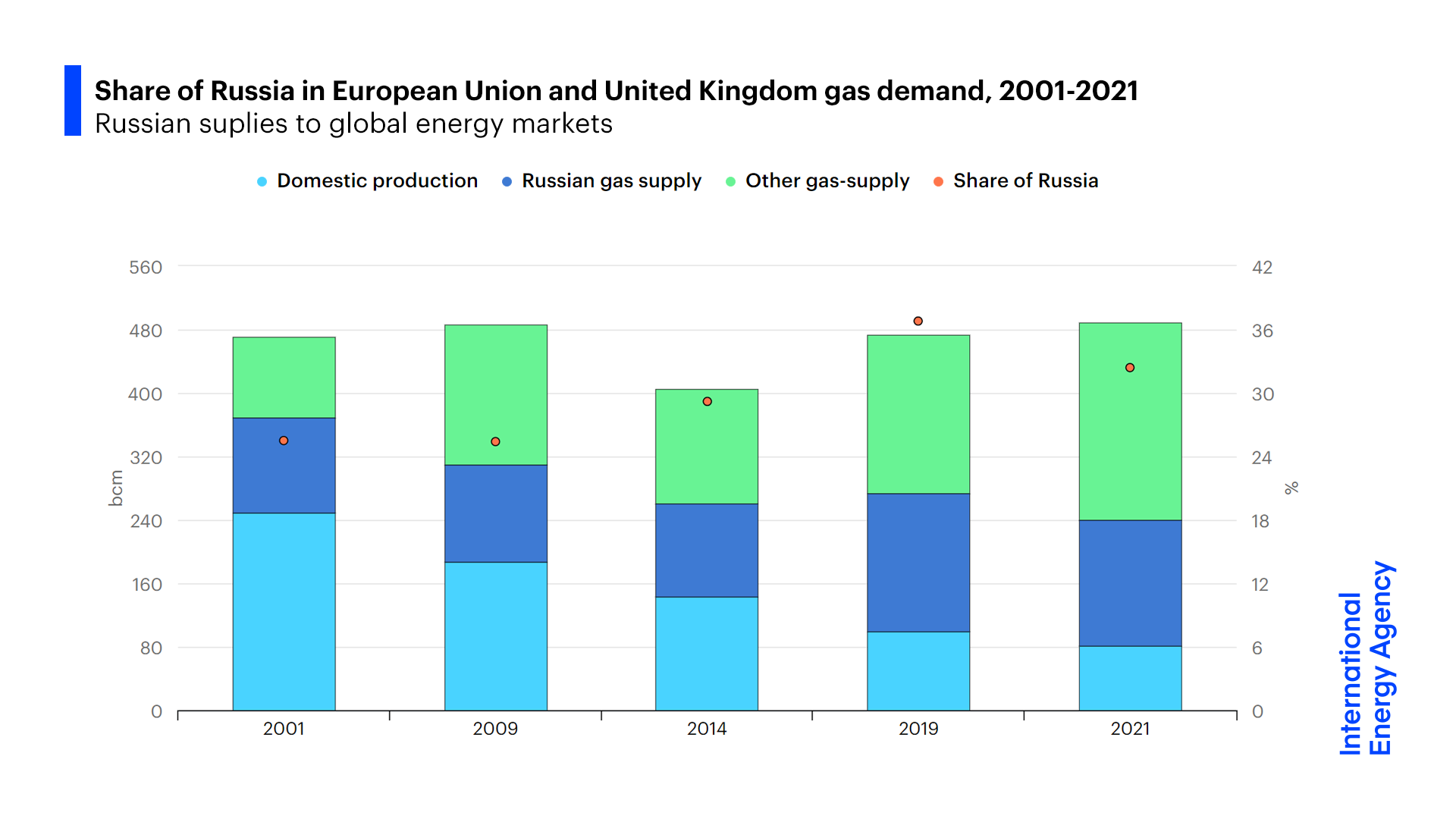
Share of Russia in EU and UK gas demand, 2001-21

In late 2019, Russia launched a major eastward gas export pipeline, the roughly 3,000 km-long Power of Siberia pipeline, in order to be able to send gas from far east fields directly to China. Russia is looking to develop the Power of Siberia 2 pipeline, with a capacity of 50 bcm/year, which would supply China from the West Siberian gas fields. No supply agreements and no final investment decision have yet been reached on the pipeline.

Furthermore, Russia was expanding its liquefied natural gas (LNG) capacity, in order to compete with growing LNG exports from the United States, Australia and Qatar. In 2021, Russia exported 40 bcm of LNG, making it the world's 4th largest LNG exporter and accounting for approximately 8% of global LNG supply. However the EU will stop importing Russian LNG.

In the early 21st century Russia was increasingly focused on the Arctic as a way to increase oil and gas production. The Arctic accounts for over 80% of Russia's natural gas production and an estimated 20% of its crude production. While climate change threatens future investment in the region, it also presents Russia with the opportunity of increasing access to Arctic trade routes, allowing for further flexibility for seaborne deliveries of fossil fuels, particularly to Asia, provided sanctions permit the construction of specialist ice breaking LNG tankers.

In 2022 Russia lost 75% of their export market following the Russian invasion of Ukraine when the European Union took the decision to cease buying Russian energy.

=== Oil ===
Russia is a major player in global energy markets. It is one of the world's top three crude oil producers, vying for the top spot with Saudi Arabia and the United States. In 2021, Russian crude and condensate output reached 10.5 million barrels per day, making up 14% of the world's total supply. Russia has oil and gas production facilities throughout the country, but the bulk of its fields are concentrated in western and eastern Siberia. China is the largest importer of Russian crude (making up 20% of Russian exports), but Russia exports a significant volume to buyers in Europe.

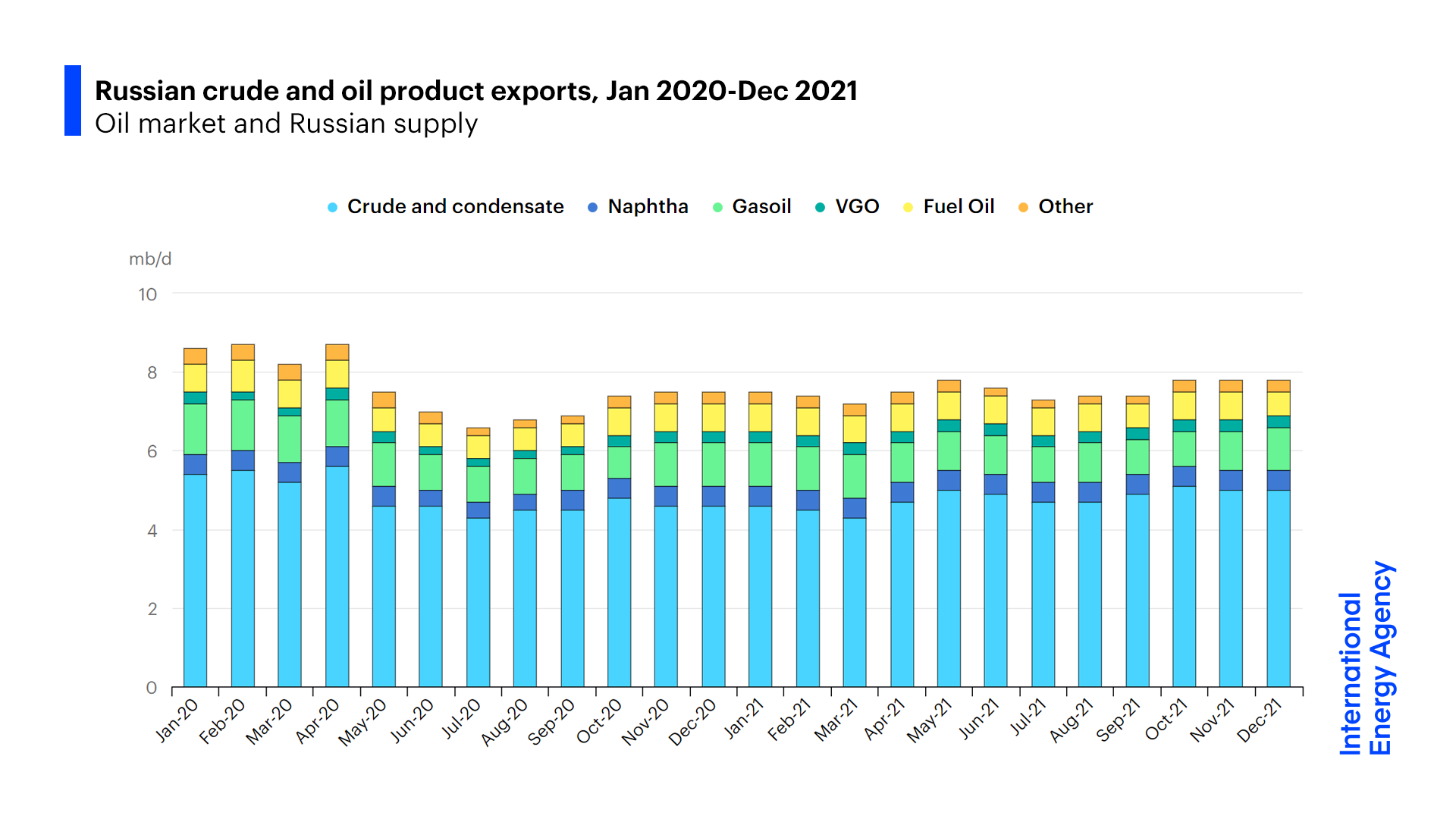
Russian crude and oil product exports, Jan 2020-Dec 2021

While the Russian oil industry has seen a period of consolidation in recent years, several major players remain. Rosneft, which is state-owned, is the largest oil producer in Russia. It is followed by Lukoil, which is the largest privately owned oil company in the country. Gazprom Neft, Surgutneftegaz, Tatneft and Russneft also have significant production and refining assets.

Russia has extensive crude export pipeline capacity, allowing it to ship large volumes of crude oil directly to Europe as well as Asia. The roughly 5,500 km Druzhba pipeline system, the world's longest pipeline network, transports 750,000 bpd of crude directly to refiners in east and central Europe. In 2012, Russia launched the 4,740 km 1.6 million bpd Eastern Siberia—Pacific Ocean oil pipeline, which sends crude directly to Asian markets such as China and Japan. The pipeline was part of Russia's general energy pivot to Asia, a strategy focused on shifting export dependence away from Europe, and taking advantage of growing Asian demand for crude. Russia also ships crude by tanker from the Northwest ports of Ust-Luga and Primorsk, as well as the Black Sea port of Novorossiysk, and Kozmino in the Far East. In addition, Russia also exports crude by rail. In 2022 much of the pipe delivered crude oil to Europe ceased, as did most ship borne crude oil to Europe, as a result of sanctions.

Russian companies spent the 2010s investing heavily in refining capacity in order to take advantage of favorable government taxation, as well as growing global diesel demand.

Russia's energy strategy prioritizes self-sufficiency in gasoline, so it tends to export minimal volumes. However, Russian refiners produced roughly double the diesel needed to satisfy domestic demand, and typically exported half their annual production, much of it to European markets. In 2021 Russia exported 750,000 bpd of diesel to Europe, meeting 10% of demand. The EU market for refined oil products was lost following the invasion of Ukraine and the 2023 introduction of sanctions.

=== Coal ===
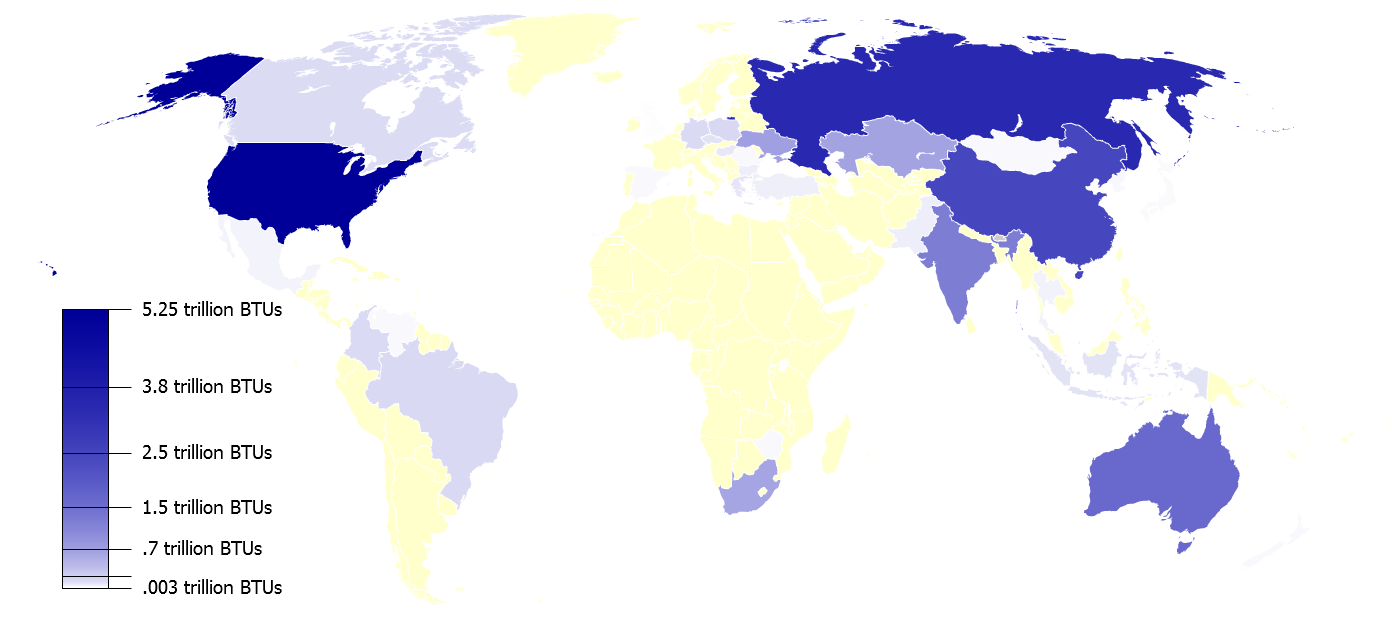
Global coal reserves in BTUs at end 2009

Russia has the world's second largest coal reserves, with 157 billion tonnes of reserves. Russia is the world's third largest coal exporter. Since the Russian full-scale invasion of Ukraine in 2022, European sanctions have forced Russia to intensify the reorientation of its coal exports towards Asia. However, limited eastward rail capacity is a severe bottleneck for coal exports to Asia.

Russian coal reserves are widely dispersed. The principal hard coal deposits are located in the Pechora and Kuznetsk basins. The Kansk-Achinsk basin contains huge deposits of brown coal. The Siberian Lena and Tunguska basins are largely unexplored resources, which would probably be difficult to exploit commercially.

=== Hydropower ===
Hydropower accounts for about 20% of Russia's total electric power production. The country has 102 hydropower plants in operation, with RusHydro the world's second-largest hydroelectric power producer.

Hydro generation (including pumped-storage output) in 2020 was 196 TWh, which represents 4.4% of world hydroelectricity generation. In 2020 installed hydroelectric generating capacity was 49.9 GW, making Russia the seventh largest hydroelectricity producer in the world.

Gross theoretical potential of the Russian hydro resource base is 2,295 TWh per year, of which 852 TWh is regarded as economically feasible. Most of this potential is located in Siberia and the Far East.

=== Nuclear power ===
Nuclear power produced 216 TWh of electricity in 2020, representing 20% of Russian electricity production and 11.8% of global nuclear power production. There are thirty-eight nuclear reactors in operation across Russia producing 29.4 GW of electricity. Four new reactors are under construction, with a further thirty-four in various stages of planning.

From 2001, all Russian civil reactors were operated by Energoatom. On 19 January 2007, Russian Parliament adopted legislation which created Atomenergoprom - a holding company for all Russian civil nuclear industry, including Energoatom, the nuclear fuel producer and supplier TVEL, the uranium trader Tekhsnabexport (Tenex) and nuclear facilities constructor Atomstroyexport.

Uranium exploration and development activities have been largely concentrated on three east-of-Urals uranium districts (Transural, West Siberia and Vitim). The most important uranium-producing area has been the Streltsovsky region near Krasnokamensk in the Chita Oblast. In 2019, Russia was the world's seventh largest producer of uranium, accounting for 4.7% of global output.

=== Peat ===
Despite the wildfires in Russia partly due to previous peat extraction, as late as 2023 some Russian academics were still considering peat as a fuel.

=== Renewable energy ===
Low prices for energy and in particular subsidies for natural gas hinder renewable energy development in Russia. Russia lags behind other countries in creating a conducive framework for renewable energy development. Non-hydroelectric renewable energy in Russia is largely undeveloped although Russia has many potential renewable energy resources.

==== Geothermal energy ====
Geothermal energy, which is used for heating and electricity production in some regions of the Northern Caucasus and the Far East, is the most developed renewable energy source in Russia after hydroelectric energy. Geothermal resources have been identified in the Northern Caucasus, Western Siberia, Lake Baikal, and in Kamchatka and the Kuril Islands. In 1966 a 4 MWe single-flash plant was commissioned at Pauzhetka (currently 11 MWe) followed by a 12 MWe geothermal power plant at Verkhne Mutnovsky, and 50 MWe Mutnovsky geothermal power plant. At the end of 2005 installed capacity for direct use amounted to more than 307 MWt.

==== Solar energy ====
It has been estimated that Russia's gross potential for solar energy is 2.3 trillion tce. The regions with the best solar radiation potential are the North Caucasus, the Black Sea and the Caspian Sea areas, and southern parts of Siberia and the Far East. This potential is largely unused, although the possibilities for off-grid solar energy or hybrid applications in remote areas are huge. However, the construction of a single solar power plant Kislovodskaya SPP (1.5 MW) has been delayed.

==== Wind energy ====
Russia has high quality wind resources on the Pacific and Arctic coasts and in vast steppe and mountain areas. Large-scale wind energy systems are suitable in Siberia and the Far East (east of Sakhalin Island, the south of Kamchatka, the Chukotka Peninsula, Vladivostok), the steppes along the Volga river, the northern Caucasus steppes and mountains and on the Kola Peninsula, where power infrastructure and major industrial consumers are in place. At the end of 2006, total installed wind capacity was 15 MW. Major wind power stations operate at Kalmytskaya (2 MW), Zapolyarnaya (1.5 MW), Kulikovskaya (5.1 MW), Tyupkildi (2.2 MW) and Observation Cape (2.5 MW). Feasibility studies are being carried out on the Kaliningradskaya (50 MW) and the Leningradskaya (75 MW) wind farms. There are about 100 MW of wind projects in Kalmykia and in Krasnodar Krai.

==== Tidal energy ====
A small pilot tidal power plant with a capacity of 400 kW was constructed at Kislaya Guba near Murmansk in 1968. In 2007, Gidro OGK, a subsidiary of the Unified Energy System (UES) began the installation of a 1.5 MW experimental orthogonal turbine at Kislaya Guba. If it proves successful, UES plans to continue with Mezen Bay (15,000 MW) and Tugur Bay (7,980 MW) projects.

== Electricity sector ==
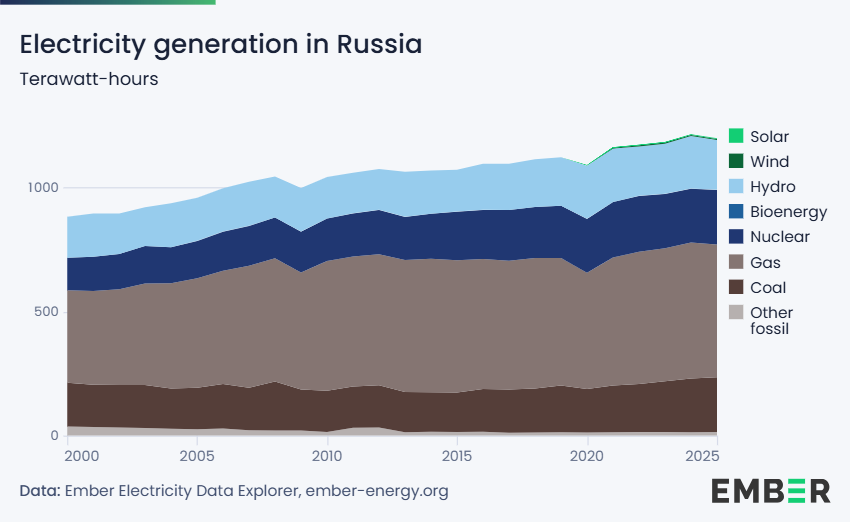
Electricity generation in Russia in terawatt-hours

Russia is the world's fourth largest electricity producer after China, the United States, and India. In 2020, Russia produced 1,085 TWh and exported 20 TWh of electricity.

Roughly 60% of Russia's electricity is generated by fossil fuels, 20% by hydroelectricity, 20% by nuclear reactors. Renewable energy generation is minimal.

== Billionaires ==
Russian billionaires in energy by Forbes in 2013 included No 41 Mikhail Fridman ($16.5 B), No 47 Leonid Michelson ($15.4 B), 52 Viktor Vekselberg ($15.1 B), 55 Vagit Alekperov ($14.8 B), 56 Andrey Melnichenko ($14.4 B), 62 Gennady Timchenko ($14.1 B), 103 German Khan ($10.5 B), 138 Alexei Kuzmichov ($8.2 B), 162 Leonid Fedun ($7.1 B), 225 Pyotr Aven ($5.4 B), 423 Vladimir Bogdanov ($3.2 B), 458 Mikhail Gutseriev ($3 B), 641 Alexander Dzhaparidze ($2.3 B), 792 Igor Makarov ($1.9 B), 882 Anatoly Skurov ($1.7 B), 974 Vladimir Gridin and family ($1.5 B), 974 Andrei Kosogov ($1.5 B), 1031Farkhad Akhmedov ($1.4 B), 1088 Alexander Putilov ($1.35 B), 1161 Mikhail Abyzov ($1.25 B) and 1175 Konstantin Grigorishin ($1.2 B).

== See also ==
- Economy of Russia
- Energy policy of Russia
- Petroleum industry in Russia
- Oil reserves in Russia
- Russia in the European energy sector
- Mining industry of Russia
- List of oil and gas fields of the Barents Sea
- Oil megaprojects (2011)
- Petroleum exploration in the Arctic
- European countries by fossil fuel use (% of total energy)
- European countries by electricity consumption per person
- Climate change in Russia
- Greenhouse gas emissions by Russia
- List of power stations in Russia
- Energy policy of the Soviet Union

== Sources ==
This article incorporates text from a free content work. Licensed under CC BY 4.0 (license statement/permission). Text taken from Frequently Asked Questions on Energy Security, International Energy Agency.

This article incorporates text from a free content work. Licensed under CC BY 4.0 (license statement/permission). Text taken from Energy Fact Sheet: Why does Russian oil and gas matter?, International Energy Agency.
