= Environmental issues in Russia =

Environmental issues in Russia include pollution and erosion, and have impacts on people, wildlife and ecosystems.

Many of the issues have been attributed to policies that were made during the early Soviet Union, at a time when many officials felt that pollution control was an unnecessary hindrance to economic development and industrialization, and, even though numerous attempts were made by the Soviet government to alleviate the situation in the 1960s, 1970s and 1980s, the problems were not completely solved. By the 1990s, 40% of Russia's territory began demonstrating symptoms of significant ecological stress, largely due to a diverse number of environmental issues, including deforestation, energy irresponsibility, pollution, and nuclear waste. According to Russia's Ministry of Natural Resources and Environment, Russia is currently warming 2.5 times faster than the rest of the globe.

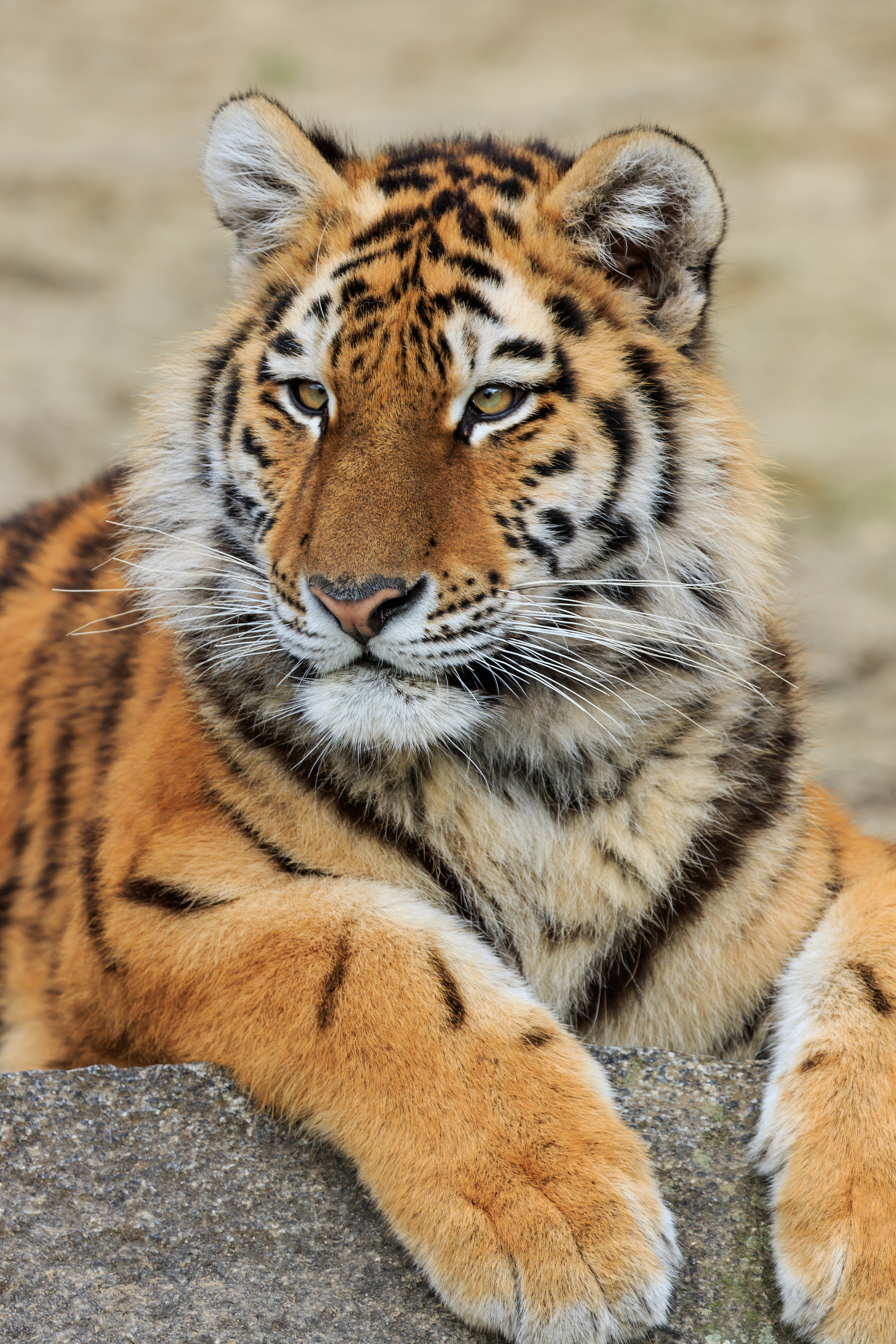
Several species, such as the Siberian tiger and Amur leopard, are at risk of extinction.

== Wildlife ==
Russia has many protected areas, such as zapovedniks and natural parks, which are made to preserve the natural state of environments. There are currently 101 zapovedniks that cover a total of over 33.5 million hectares. However, some animals, such as the Amur tiger, polar bear, and Caucasian leopard, are facing extinction. The Russian government is attempting to revive those populations. A tiger summit was held in St. Petersburg in 2010 to discuss how to save the dwindling tiger population, which is threatened by deforestation and poaching in Russia.

== Deforestation and logging ==
Excessive logging is causing the widespread deforestation of certain areas of Russia. Despite efforts of Russian authorities to preserve forests using nature reserves and parks, funding for park rangers is lacking, limiting the protection of forests. Illegal logging is also widespread, especially in the north-west and in the Far East parts of Russia. It is estimated that Russia loses $1 billion every year due to illegal logging. According to the Center for Russian Environmental Policy, 16 million hectares of forest are lost each year to a variety of causes, including logging, pollution, and fires. Inefficient logging and clearcutting strategies result in 40% of harvested trees never being used, and the implementation of forest protection policies has been slow.

Russia had a 2018 Forest Landscape Integrity Index mean score of 9.02/10, ranking it 10th globally out of 172 countries.

== Energy ==
Up to its collapse in 1991, the Soviet Union generated 1.5 times as much pollution per unit of GNP as the United States.

Inefficient energy usage and the use of fossil fuels is another environmental issue that Russia faces. The Ministry of Energy stated that upgrading energy sector equipment could cut carbon emissions by 25%, and the Energy Research Institute predicts that such measures could save up to $1 billion of fuel every year. 68% of Russia's energy is produced by polluting fossil fuels, and it is a large producer of those fuels.

== Pollution ==
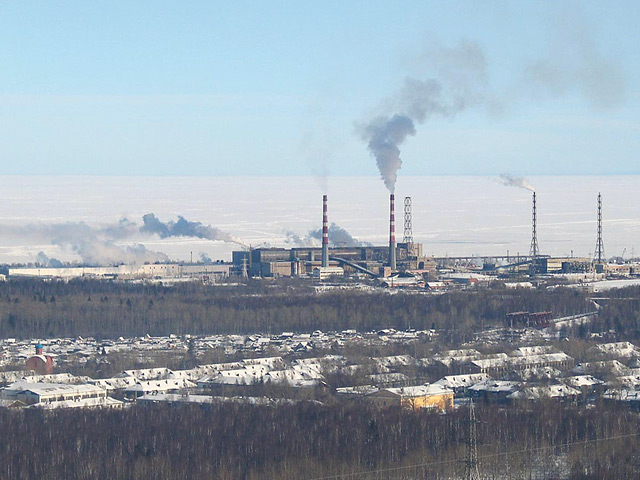
Factories, such as the Baykalsk Pulp and Paper Mill, have contributed significantly to water pollution in Russia.

=== Air pollution ===
Moscow, St. Petersburg, Yekaterinburg, and Volgograd, as well as other major industrial and population centers, have the highest concentrations of air pollution. Overall, over 200 cities in Russia exceed pollution limits, and this is increasing as more vehicles appear on the roads. Before the 1990s, most air pollution came from industries. When industrial production declined, emissions of air pollutants from those sources also declined, although the amount of motor vehicles on the roads skyrocketed. Currently, vehicle emissions exceed industry emissions in most Russian cities. Air pollution is attributed to 17% of childhood and 10% of adult diseases, as well as 41% of respiratory and 16% of endocrine diseases.

=== Water pollution ===
Water pollution is a serious problem in Russia, and 75% of surface water, and 50% of all water in Russia is now polluted. Towards the end of the Soviet era the government increasingly recognized the need to take care of the spawning sites and habitats of fish, in order to return fish catches to what they had been. This has caused health issues in many cities as well as in the countryside, as only 8% of wastewater is fully treated before being returned to waterways. Obsolete and inefficient water treatment facilities, as well as a lack of funding, have caused heavy pollution, and has also resulted in waterborne disease spread, such as an outbreak of cholera spread by the Moskva River in 1995. Industrial and chemical waste is often dumped into waterways, including hydrogen sulfide, which has been linked to the large-scale death of fish in the Black and Caspian seas. Lake Baikal was previously a target of environmental pollution from paper plants, but cleanup efforts since then have greatly reduced the ecological strain on the lake.

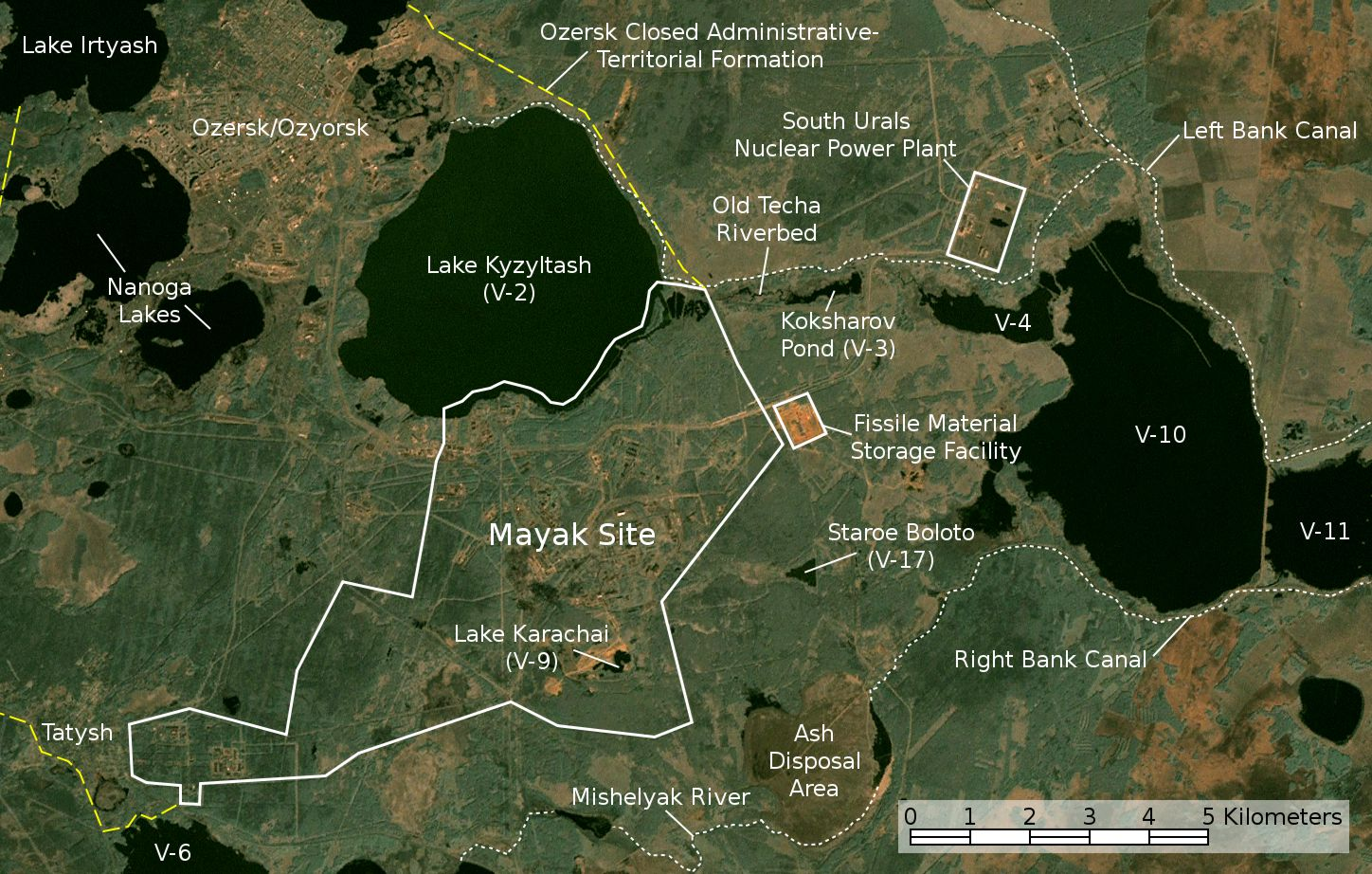
Unsafe dumping of nuclear waste has contributed to radioactive contamination of local environments, such as the area around Lake Karachay.

Unsafe dumping methods have been used sometimes to get rid of military nuclear waste, which was dumped into the Sea of Japan until 1993. The testing and production of nuclear weapons also affected the environment, such as at the Mayak atomic weapons production plant near Chelyabinsk.

=== Radioactive Waste ===
Radioactive waste can be described as high-level waste or low-level waste. High-level waste is what can be seen as the waste from the use of nuclear fuel which is typically stored at the site of the nuclear power plant is it produced from. This can also include the waste produced by the mining of uranium and thorium both of which are key components for the usage of nuclear fuel. Low-level waste consists of things that have come in contact with radioactive waste such as packaging, clothing, and other similar materials found on site. The main difference between the two categories is the level of radioactivity one would be exposed to when coming into contact with these materials. According to the World Nuclear Association, low-level waste is no more than four giga-becquerels per tonne of alpha activity or twelve giga-becquerels per tonne of gamma-beta activity.

An example of the effects of radioactive waste can be seen in the construction of the SouthEast Chord highway. Since 2018, Moscow's Department for Transportation and Construction has attempted to create an eight-lane highway over what is now an inactive nuclear plant. The Moscow Polymetal Plant, owned by Rosatom State Energy Corporation, was shut down over 50 years ago and is said to still contain harmful nuclear waste resulting in it being labeled a radioactive site. Its main purpose was for the extraction and production of uranium and thorium resulting in high levels of radiation in the surrounding area (reported by the environmental justice organization Greenpeace). The Government of Moscow and Radon State Unitary Enterprise, both responsible for the management of radioactive waste, have claimed that appropriate measures of decontamination have taken place in order for construction of the highway to commence.

The main conflict associated with the SouthEast Chord project is nuclear waste storage and its harmful effects to human health and the surrounding environment making this site unsafe for the usage of a highway. According to the Center for Disease Control and Prevention and their article on the effects of radiation on the human cause, radioactive waste can directly damage the structure of one's DNA as well as major organs. This alteration of DNA can leave victims at high risk of cancer or even death. Ultimately, this all depends on the radiation dosage and, in this case, how frequently a civilian were to drive on this portion of the SouthEast Chord. The main contaminants highlighted are the extraction of uranium and production of thorium for the purpose of nuclear reactors.

== Soil erosion ==
Snow run-off has caused substantial erosion in pastures and croplands in northern Russia, particularly near the Ural Mountains. In parts of southern Russia, overgrazing and deforestation has resulted in large plots of bare soil which are highly susceptible to wind erosion.

== See also ==
- Environment of Russia
- Energy policy of Russia
- Renewable energy in Russia
- Climate change in Russia
- Environmental issues in Lake Baikal
- Pollution in the Gulf of Finland
