= Climate Doctrine of the Russian Federation =

Russian policy on climate change

The Climate Doctrine of the Russian Federation documents the state policy of the Russian Federation towards climate change. Taking into account the strategic guidelines of the Russian Federation, the Doctrine is the basis for the formation and implementation of climate policy. It represents a system of views on the purpose, principles, content and ways of implementing the unified state policy of the Russian Federation in the country and in the international arena on issues related to climate change and its consequences. The document was approved by the order of the President of the Russian Federation on December 17, 2009.

== Legal basis ==
The legal basis of the Doctrine is the Constitution of the Russian Federation, federal laws, regulatory legal acts of the President of the Russian Federation and the Government of the Russian Federation, the United Nations Framework Convention on Climate Change of May 9, 1992 and other international treaties of the Russian Federation, including those on environment and sustainable development.

== Basic provisions ==
The document was drafted within the framework of the obligations of the Russian side on the development of policies and measures in the field of climate under the UN Framework Convention on Climate Change. It calls climate change one of the most important international problems of the twenty-first century, going beyond the scientific issue and representing a complex interdisciplinary problem covering environmental, economic and social aspects of sustainable development of the Russian Federation.

The main objectives of the Russian Federation's climate policy, according to the text of the document, are

- Strengthening and development of the scientific basis of the Russian Federation policy in the field of climate;
- Development and implementation of operational and long-term measures to mitigate anthropogenic impact on the climate;
- Participation in initiatives of the international community in addressing climate change and related issues.

The Russian Federation's vast territory means there is a particular focus on the breadth of consequences: "the exceptional diversity and scale of climate change in the regions of the Russian Federation and its consequences for the environment, the economy and the population is a natural consequence of the large size of the territory and the great diversity of natural conditions". The necessity of a response due to the inevitability of climate change was repeated by Arkady Dvorkovich, Assistant to the Head of State, at a special press conference on the day of signing the document: "according to the opinion of our scientists, which is reflected in the climate doctrine, the share of human influence on climate change remains difficult to calculate. Much of the climate change is related to global long-term trends, and whatever we do, it is likely that some changes will continue due to natural causes, so we will have to take action."

== Practical implementation measures ==
Once the Doctrine was approved, the Government of the Russian Federation on April 25, 2011 issued an order which:

- Approved an attached plan of implementation of the Climate Doctrine of the Russian Federation for the period up to 2020;
- Obliged federal executive authorities to perform the plan approved by the order, within the resource limits established by the Government of the Russian Federation;
- Recommended the bodies of state power of the subjects of the Russian Federation form regional programs of social and economic development.
