= Plug-in electric vehicles in Russia =

As of July 2022, there were around 18,700 electric vehicles in Russia, equivalent to 0.04% of all cars in the country. As of 2021, around 0.13% of new cars sold in Russia were electric. As of July 2024 there were around 40,000 PHEVs in Russia.

== Statistics ==
As of August 2022, the Volkswagen ID.4 was the best-selling electric car in Russia.

== Government policy ==
Annual car tax in Russia for parallel hybdrids based on combined power of ICE and electric motors, while for series hybrids only power of electric engine taken for calculation purposes (thus making series hybrids less taxable).

== Charging stations ==
As of 2021, there were around 400 public charging stations in Russia.

== Manufacturing ==
The first electric vehicle manufacturing plant in Russia, operated by Dongfeng Motor Corporation, opened in September 2022 in Lipetsk Oblast.

== By federal subject ==
=== Moscow ===
As of May 2022, there were about 3,000 electric vehicles in Moscow.
