= Hydroelectricity in Russia =

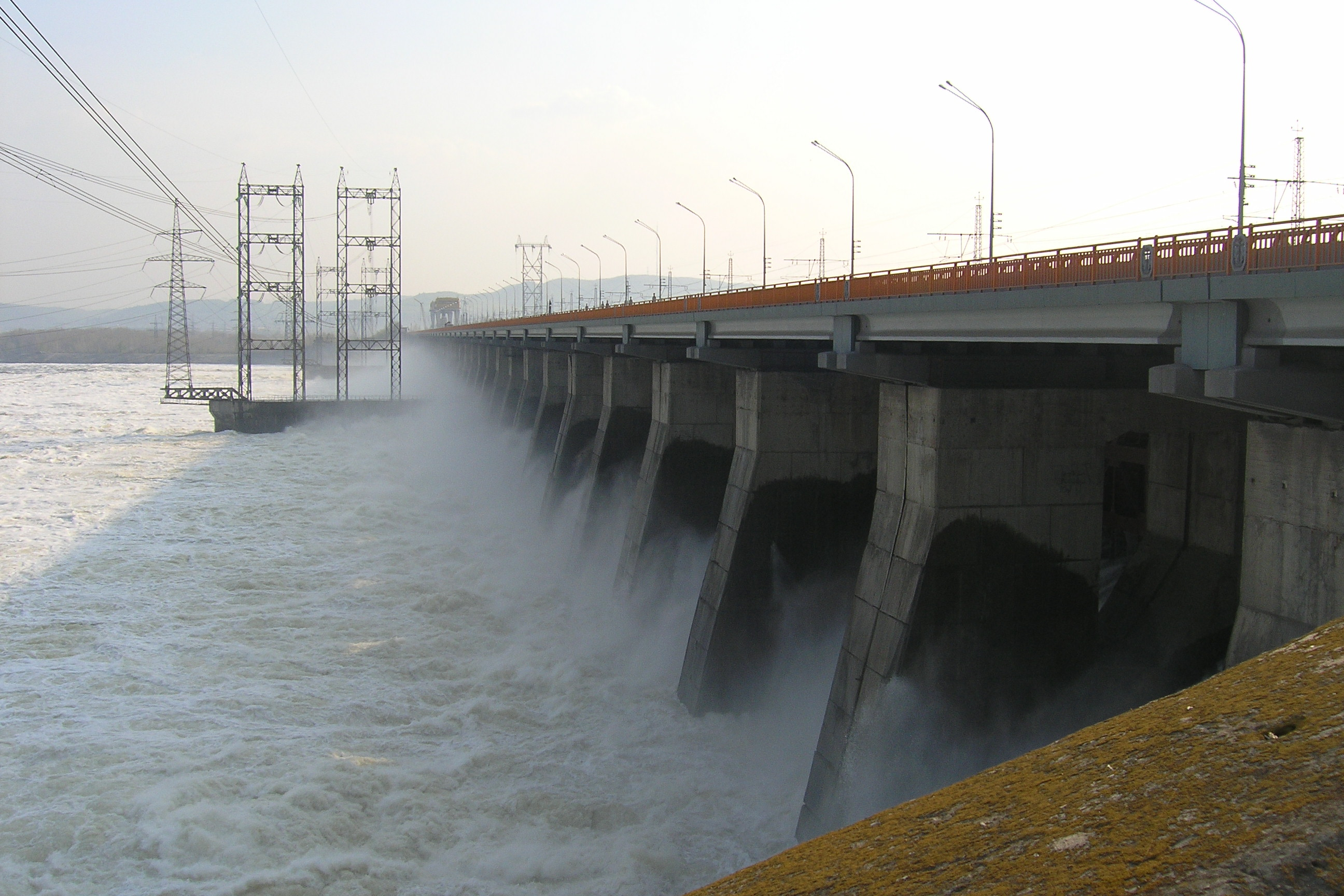
Zhiguli Hydroelectric Station during a freshet

Hydropower is the most used form of renewable energy in Russia, and there is large potential in Russia for more use of hydropower. According to the International Hydropower Association Russia is the seventh largest producer of hydroelectricity in 2020. It is also second in the world for hydro potential, yet only 20% of this potential is developed. Russia is home to 9% of the world's hydro resources, mostly in Siberia and the country's far east. At the end of 2005, the generating capacity from hydroelectric sources in Russia was 45,700 MW, and an additional 5,648 MW was under construction. The World Energy Council believes that Russia has much potential for using its hydro resources, with a theoretical potential of about 2,295 TWh/yr, with 852 TWh being economically feasible.

The largest dams in Russia are the Sayano-Shushenskaya Dam, which has an installed capacity of 6,400 MW; the Krasnoyarsk Dam (6,000 MW); the Bratsk Dam (4,500 MW); the Ust-Ilimsk Dam (4,320 MW) and the Zeya Dam (1,330 MW). Some of the most recent dam projects are the Bureya Dam (2010 MW) and the Irganai Dam (800 MW). The Boguchany Dam (1920 MW), Zelenchuk Dam (320 MW), Zaramag Dam (352 MW) and Nizhne-Chereksky (60 MW) are currently under construction. RusHydro is the largest hydroelectric company in Russia and the second largest hydroelectric producer in the world. In October 2010, China Yangtze Power, the largest hydropower corporation in China, and EuroSibEnergo, a Russian energy company, signed a cooperation agreement to expand hydroelectric energy production in Russia and export energy to China's northern territories.

== Largest hydropower plants ==
Rank	Name	Capacity (MW)	Commissioning years	Owner	River	Region	Sources
1	Sayano-Shushenskaya	6,400	1978-1985; 2011-2014	RusHydro	Yenisei	Khakassia	
2	Krasnoyarsk	6,000	1967-1971	EuroSibEnergo	Yenisei	Krasnoyarsk Krai	
3	Bratsk	4,500	1961-1966	EuroSibEnergo	Angara	Irkutsk Oblast	
4	Ust-Ilimsk	3,840	1974-1979	EuroSibEnergo	Angara	Irkutsk Oblast	
5	Boguchany	2,997	2012-2014	RusHydro / RUSAL	Angara	Krasnoyarsk Krai	
6	Volga	2,660	1958-1961	RusHydro	Volga	Volgograd Oblast	
7	Zhiguli	2,456	1955-1957	RusHydro	Volga	Samara Oblast	
8	Bureya	2,010	2003-2007	RusHydro	Bureya	Amur Oblast	
9	Saratov	1,404	1967-1970	RusHydro	Volga	Saratov Oblast	
10	Cheboksary	1,374	1980-1986	RusHydro	Volga	Chuvashia	
11	Zeya	1,330	1975-1980	RusHydro	Zeya	Amur Oblast	
12	Nizhnekamsk	1,205	1979-1987	Tatenergo	Kama	Tatarstan	
13	Votkinsk	1,035	1961-1963	RusHydro	Kama	Perm Krai	
14	Chirkei	1,000	1974-1976	RusHydro	Sulak	Dagestan	

== Accidents ==
On 17 August 2009, there was an explosion at the Sayano-Shushenskaya hydroelectric power plant, which killed 75 plant workers and injured 13. The Federal Service for Ecological, Technological, and Nuclear Supervision's investigation concluded that poor management and technical flaws were responsible. The explosion was caused by a 29-year-old turbine that experienced an uncontrolled and excessive vibration. Since then, officials from RusHydro, the operator of the plant, have called for better oversight and safety at hydroelectric plants.

== See also ==
- Renewable energy in Russia
