= Renewable energy in Russia =

Renewable energy in Russia mainly consists of hydroelectric energy. Russia is rich not only in oil, gas and coal, but also in wind, hydro, geothermal, biomass and solar energy – the resources of renewable energy. Practically all regions have at least one or two forms of renewable energy that are commercially exploitable, while some regions are rich in all forms of renewable energy resources. However, fossil fuels dominate Russia’s current energy mix, while its abundant and diverse renewable energy resources play little role.

== History ==
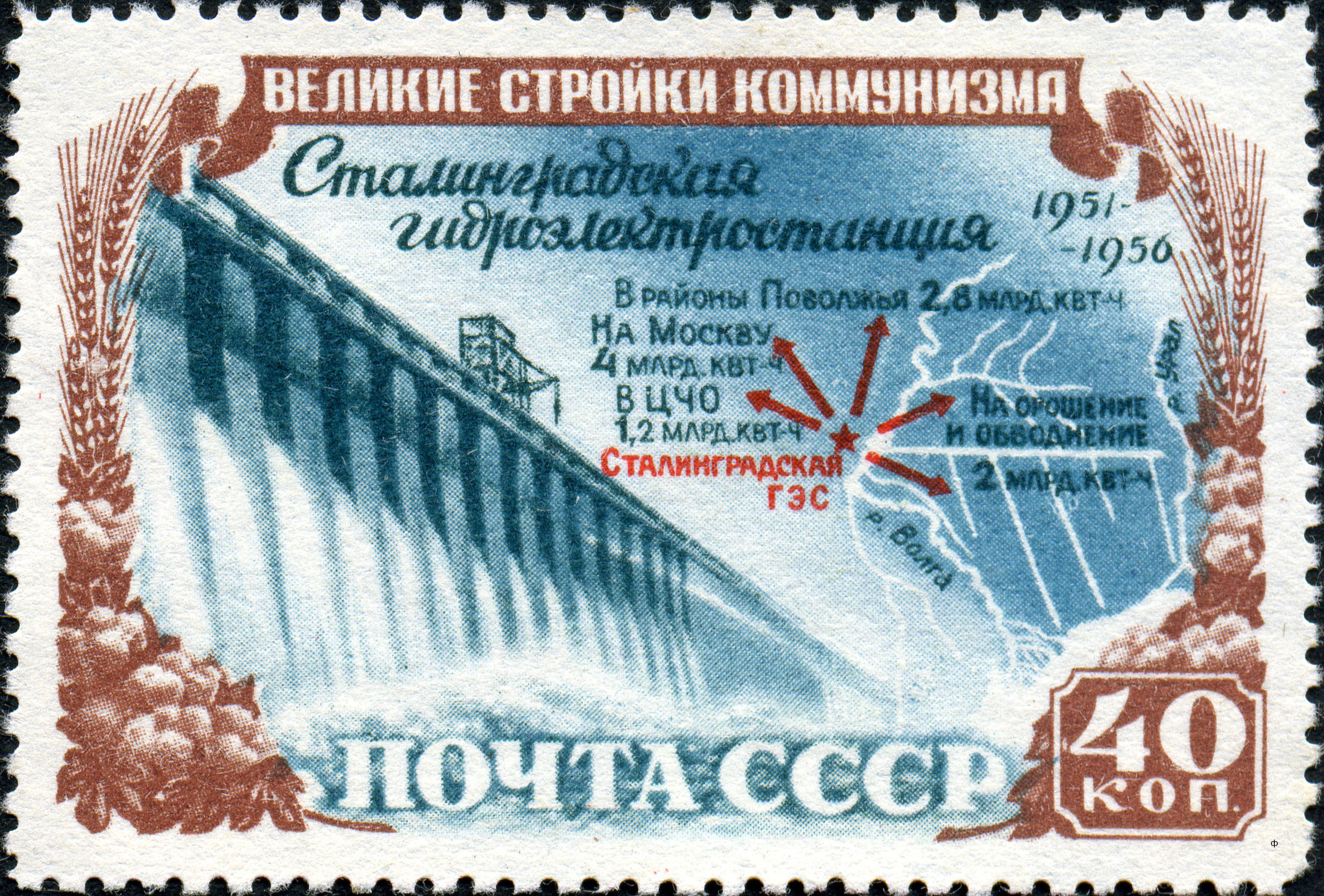
In the Soviet Union, large hydropower plants were among the Great Construction Projects of Communism (Stalingrad/Volgograd Hydroelectric Station pictured).

Most of Russia's renewable energy sources are new and have grown in the past few years. Russia was an early leader in the development of renewable energy technologies, but for a variety of reasons, it lost interest in their development except for large hydropower.

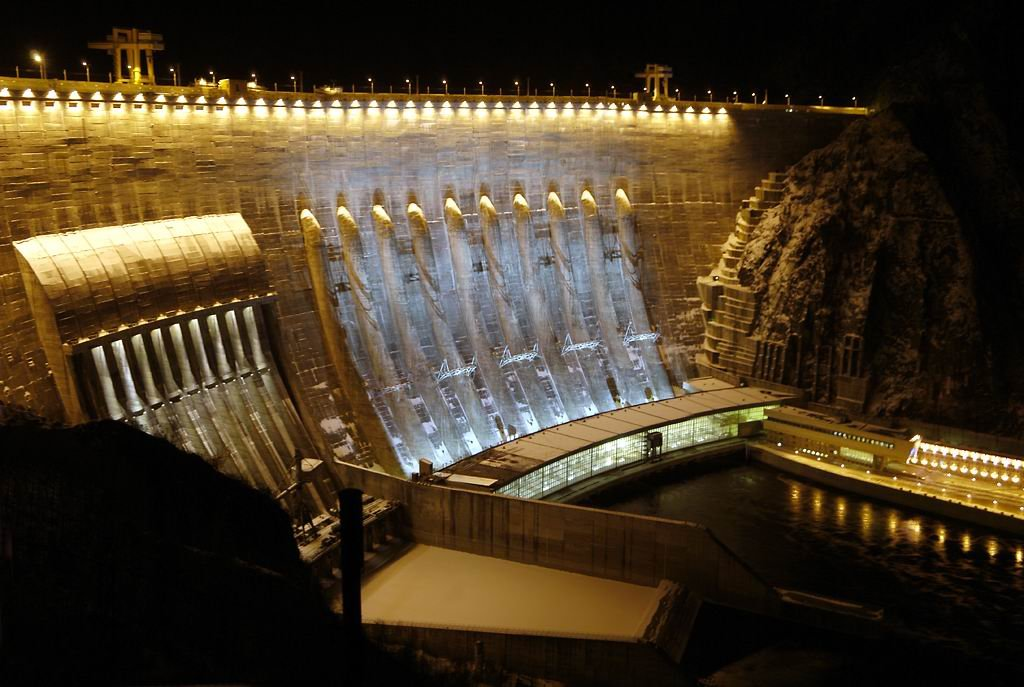
Sayano-Shushenskaya Dam, the largest hydropower plant of Russia

Hydroelectric power has a long history in Russia, dating back to the Soviet era. The rapid expansion of hydroelectric power in the Soviet Union began in 1930, when the total installed capacity equaled 600 MWh. The Soviet Union built its first windmill in 1941, which had a capacity of 100 kW. By the time the Soviet Union collapsed in 1990, it had a total installed capacity of 65 GWh. The largest dams that Russia currently has, including the Sayano-Shushenskaya Dam, were built in the 1950s and 1960s. From the 1970s to 2000, the Soviet Union and Russia focused mainly on "traditional" power sources: thermal-, hydro- and nuclear power. However, in 1986, the Soviet government announced new energy goals, which included further hydroelectric plant construction as well as the start of small-scale solar and wind use for electricity production. Overall, Soviet energy policy focused on nuclear and thermal power, although renewable energy was not completely neglected. The dissolution of the Soviet Union prevented those goals from being fulfilled.

With the formation of the Russian Federation in the 1990s, most of the big dams that were built in the Soviet Union stopped being built. Also, the post-Soviet recession caused a lot of the country's infrastructure, like dams, to break down. Use of oil and gas for energy took priority in Russia, and renewable energy was ignored. This policy lasted until 2008, when Medvedev announced reforms to Russia's energy policies in an attempt to focus more on renewable energy. Since then, there has been a rapid development of new renewable energy sources.

== Current status ==
=== Overview ===
In late 2009, Dmitry Medvedev made an ambitious declaration, expressing his intent to reduce Russia's energy consumption by 40% by the year 2020. However, several factors were impeding progress towards this goal. These obstacles included insufficient investments, economic instability, limited public demand, and the presence of low tariffs on heat and electricity. Additionally, the prevalence of subsidies for natural gas posed another significant challenge to the development of renewable energy in the country. Some of Russia's hydroelectric power plants are outdated and are in need of additional investment, as shown by the 2009 accident at the Sayano-Shushenskaya HPP. Overall, in the years following 2009, Russia had not taken sufficient measures to establish the necessary conditions for the advancement of renewable energy.

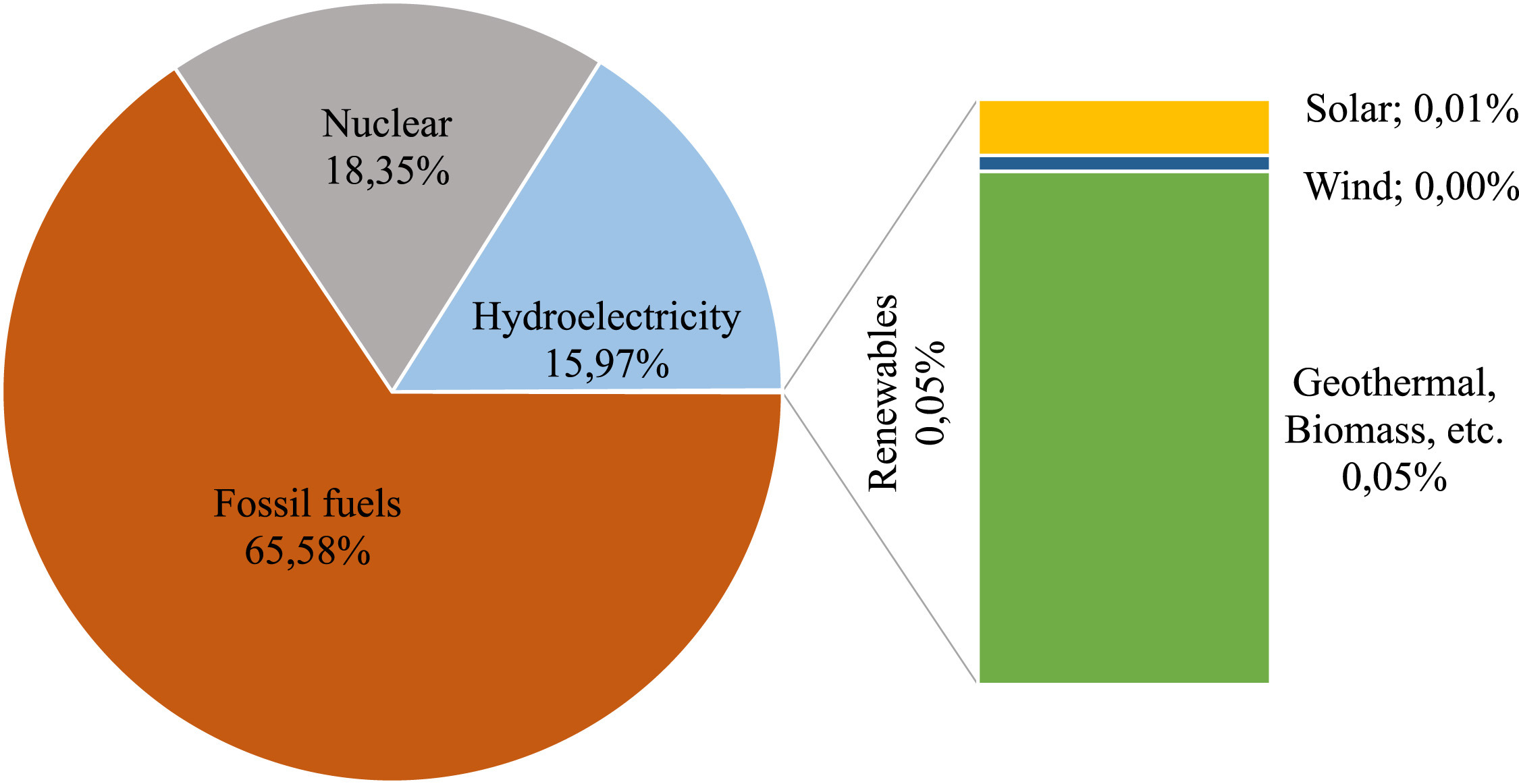
Electricity generation in Russia, by energy sources, 2015

In 2015, Russia ranked as the fifth-largest producer of hydroelectric power globally, with hydroelectricity contributing to nearly 16.0% of its total electricity generation. However, renewable energy sources, excluding large-scale hydropower, played a minuscule role in Russia's energy landscape during the same year. BP's estimates suggested that these renewables accounted for just 0.05% of the nation's overall electricity generation in 2015. Russian authorities offered slightly more optimistic figures, but still not significantly so. According to the Federal State Statistics Service (Rosstat), renewables, excluding large hydropower projects with over 25 MW of installed capacity, constituted 0.19% of the entire electricity generation in 2015.

To provide a global perspective, the proportion of hydropower in the worldwide electricity generation mix closely mirrored that of Russia at approximately 16.4%. Nevertheless, the share of other renewable energy sources in the global energy matrix was notably higher, standing at around 6.7%. This category encompasses wind power at 3.5%, solar energy at 1.05%, and additional sources such as geothermal and biomass energy, which collectively contributed 2.15%.

In 2020, the renewables share of primary energy consumption is only 0.1%. Several studies confirm Russia's significant potential in the renewable energy sector while highlighting the limited development and utilization of this potential. Russia's renewable sector offers opportunities for scaling up resource development, including high export potential, domestic market growth, energy deficit mitigation, hydrogen production, supportive policies, available land, and technological advancement. However, it continues to face significant challenges, such as an uneven playing field, local content requirements, government neglect of clean technologies, regulatory uncertainties, high project costs, harsh environmental conditions, and unfavorable institutional design.

== Hydropower ==
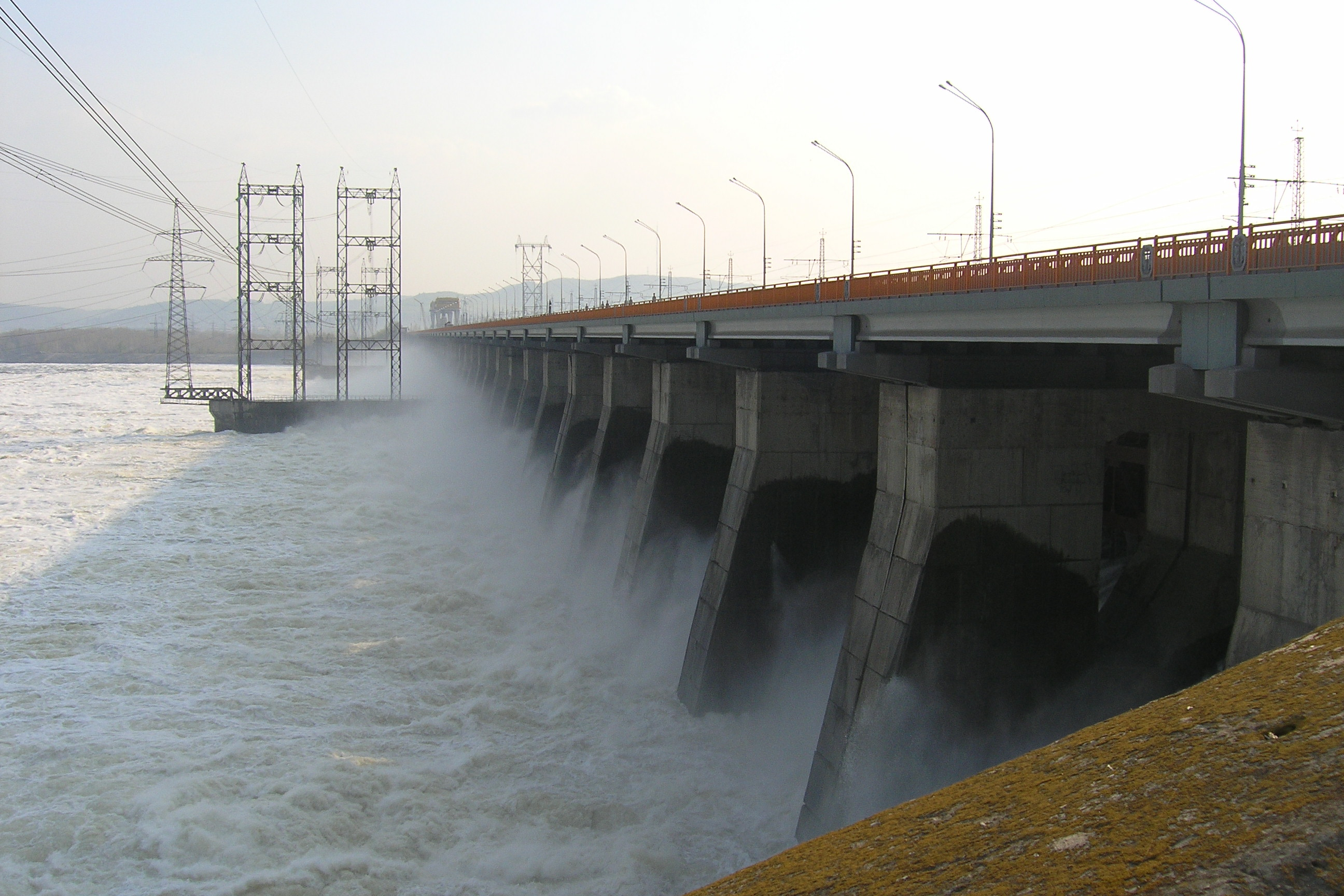
Zhiguli Hydroelectric Station during a freshet

Hydropower is the most used form of renewable energy in Russia, and there is large potential in Russia for more use of hydropower. Russia has 102 hydropower plants with capacities of over 100 MW, making it fifth in the world for hydropower production. It is also second in the world for hydro potential, yet only 20% of this potential is developed. Russia is home to 9% of the world's hydro resources, mostly in Siberia and the country's far east. At the end of 2005, the generating capacity from hydroelectric sources in Russia was 45,700 MW, and an additional 5,648 MW was under construction. The World Energy Council believes that Russia has much potential for using its hydro resources, with a theoretical potential of about 2,295 TWh/yr, with 852 TWh being economically feasible.

The largest dams in Russia are the Sayano-Shushenskaya Dam, which has an installed capacity of 6,400 MW; the Krasnoyarsk Dam (6,000 MW); the Bratsk Dam (4,500 MW); the Ust-Ilimsk Dam (4,320 MW) and the Zeya Dam (1,330 MW). Some of the most recent dam projects are the Bureya Dam (2010 MW) and the Irganai Dam (800 MW). The Boguchany Dam (1920 MW), Zelenchuk Dam (320 MW), Zaramag Dam (352 MW) and Nizhne-Chereksky (60 MW) are currently under construction. RusHydro is the largest hydroelectric company in Russia and the second largest hydroelectric producer in the world. In October 2010, China Yangtze Power, the largest hydropower corporation in China, and EuroSibEnergo, a Russian energy company, signed a cooperation agreement to expand hydroelectric energy production in Russia and export energy to China's northern territories.

== Geothermal energy ==
Geothermal energy is the second most used form of renewable energy in Russia but represents less than 1% of the total energy production. The first geothermal power plant in Russia was built at Pauzhetka, Kamchatka, in 1966, with a capacity of 5 MW. The total geothermal installed capacity in 2005 was 79 MW, with 50 MW coming from a plant at Verkhne-Mutnovsky. Russia is currently developing a 100 MW plant at Mutnovsky and a 50 MW plant in Kaliningrad. Most geothermal resources are currently used for heating settlements in the North Caucasus and Kamchatka. Half of the geothermal production is used to heat homes and industrial buildings, one-third is used to heat greenhouses and 13% is used for industrial processes.

In October 2010, Sergei Shmatko, Russia's energy minister, stated that Russia and Iceland would work together to develop Kamchatka's geothermal energy sources.

== Solar energy ==
Source: NREL

Before 2016 solar energy in Russia was virtually nonexistent, despite its large potential in the country. The first Russian solar plant was opened in Belgorod Oblast in November 2010. In 2007 it was estimated that Russia had a total theoretical potential of 2,213 TWh/yr for solar energy, with an economically feasible amount of 101 TWh. The southern parts of Russia, especially the North Caucasus, have the greatest potential for solar energy. In 2010 Russia planned to set up an overall solar capacity of 150 MW by 2020; this target was substantially exceeded, with installed solar capacity reaching approximately 2.1 GW by 2023.

Plans for the construction of a new solar plant on the Black Sea have been announced and the plant is expected to begin operations by 2012. This plant, which will have a capacity of 12.3 MW, is being built by Rusnano and Renova. Solar Wind LLC and Rusnano are building a plant that will produce double-sided solar panels, which will be able to collect solar energy from both sides. Construction is expected to finish in early 2011 and the plant will have an annual manufacturing capacity of 30 MW. Nitol Solar is the largest Russian company in the area of scientific development and manufacture of products used to generate solar energy. Russia and India are currently discussing the possibility of a joint venture to produce silicon wafers for the creation of photovoltaic cells.

An auction in 2013 awarded contracts for 399 MW of solar, and one in 2014 an additional 505 MW. A third auction in 2015 awarded 280 MW of solar.

In 2015, the Russian Solar Energy Association predicted that cumulative solar power capacity in the country would rise to 1,500 MW by 2020; actual capacity had already surpassed this figure by 2023.

Between 2017 and 2019, a pv-producing company called Solar Silicon Technologies LLC (Russian: ООО Солар Кремневые Технологии) based in Podolsk produced and built at least four solar plants totalling 130MW in power. The company was founded in 2016 and built in place of another plant Podolsk chemical-metallurgical plant (Russian: ОАО Подольский химико-металлургический завод) used to produce monocrystalline silicon since 1957.

By January 2026, installed solar capacity in Russia stood at approximately 2.2 GW according to the Russia Renewable Energy Development Association, or about 3.1 GW by broader international estimates that include distributed generation. Solar electricity generation reached 2,840 GWh in 2025, a 6.4% increase over 2024. Growth has been driven primarily by utility-scale installations in southern and eastern regions and by hybrid solar-diesel systems in remote areas such as Yakutia, where renewable energy auctions require 50–70% locally manufactured components. Analysts project capacity reaching 4 GW by 2029 and 5.3 GW by 2035.

== Wind energy ==
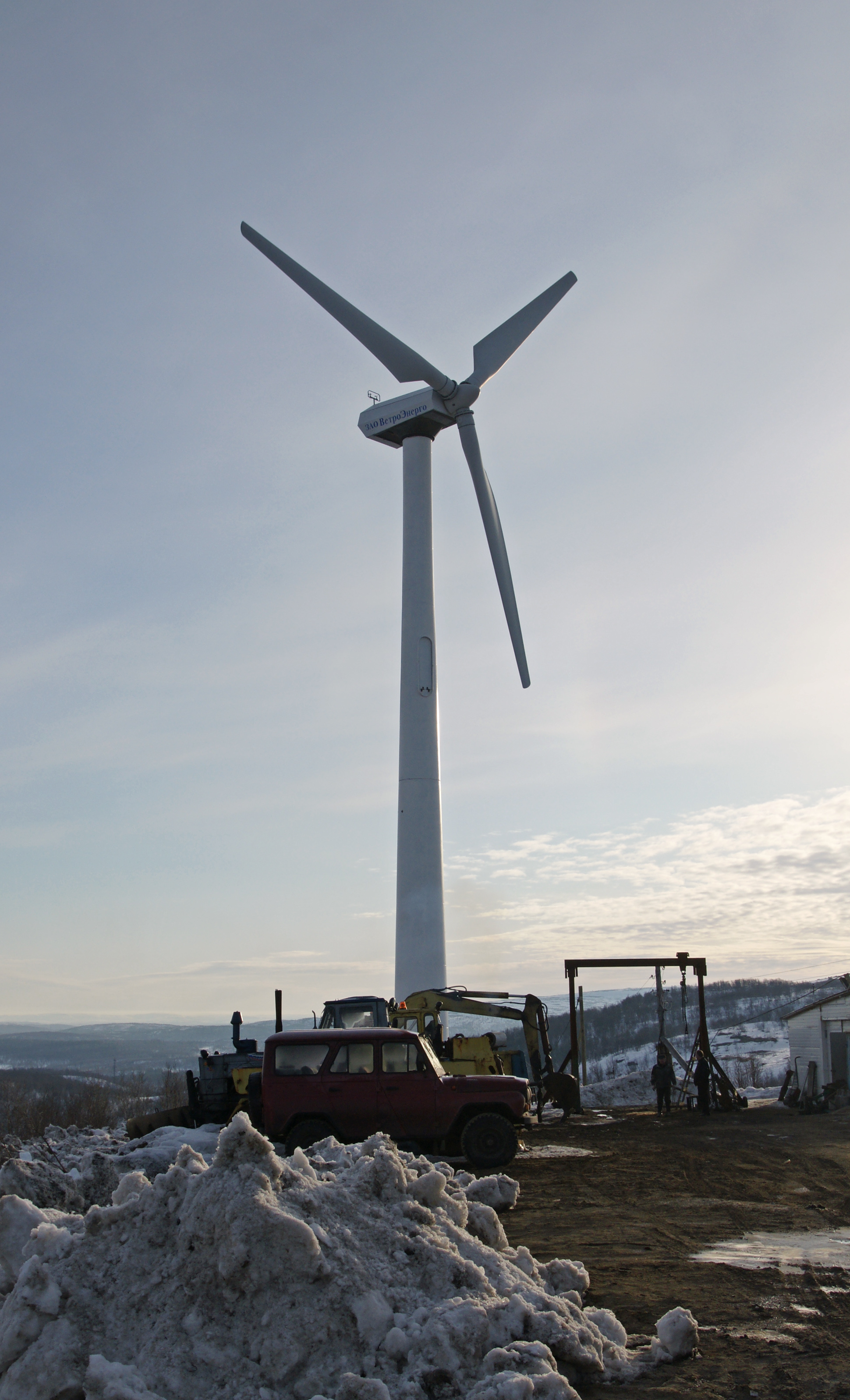
Wind turbine near an Omni Hotel, Murmansk. The wind power potential of Murmansk Oblast is one of the largest among Russian regions.

Russia has a long history of deploying small-scale wind energy generating systems but has never developed large-scale commercial wind energy production. Most of its current wind energy production is located in agricultural areas with low population densities where connection to the main energy grid is difficult. Russia is estimated to have a total potential of 80,000 TWh/yr for wind energy, 6,218 TWh/yr of which is economically feasible. Most of this potential is found in the southern steppes and the seacoasts of Russia, although in many of these areas the population density is less than 1 person per square km. This low population density means that there is little existing electricity infrastructure currently in place, which hinders development of these resources. In 2006, Russia had a total installed wind capacity of 15 MW. Current Russian wind energy projects have a combined capacity of over 1,700 MW. The Russian Wind Energy Association predicts that if Russia achieves its goal of having 4.5% of its energy come from renewable sources by 2020, the country will have a total wind capacity of 7 GW.

In 2010, plans for the construction of a wind power plant in Yeisk, on the Sea of Azov, were announced. It is expected to initially have a capacity of 50 MW, which will become 100 MW a year later. The first batch of wind towers and nacelles were delivered in June 2020 and the facility is expected to be operational by the end of 2020. German engineering company Siemens announced in July 2010, following a visit to Russia by Chancellor Angela Merkel, that it would build wind power plants in Russia. By 2015, the company hopes to install 1,250 MW of capacity in Russia.

== Tidal energy ==
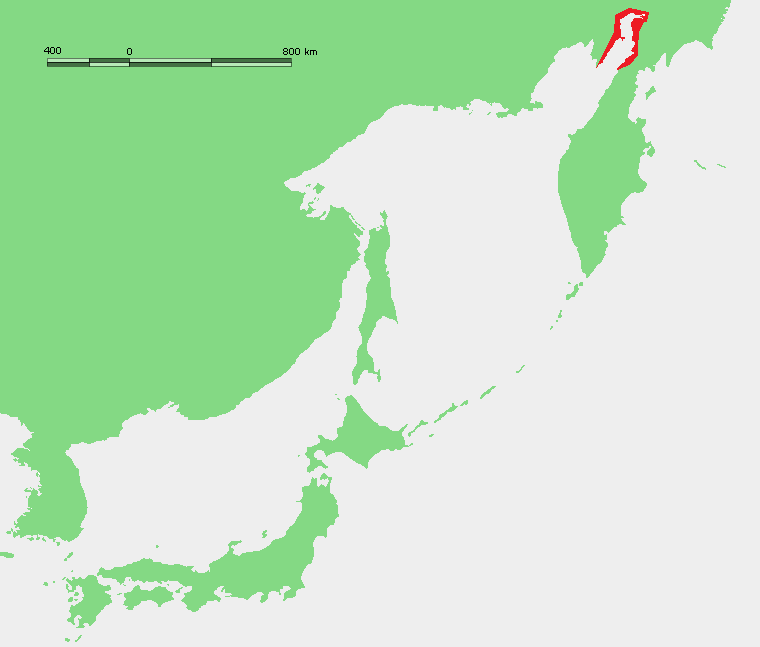
Penzhin Bay is the location of the proposed Penzhin Tidal Power Plant, which could become the world's largest electric power station.

Russia has many tidal energy resources at its disposal, although they are currently underdeveloped as well. The Kola Bay and Sea of Okhotsk alone could produce 100 GW with tidal power stations, and the national energy potential from tidal energy can compete with current total energy production. The currently active Kislaya Guba Tidal Power Station is the largest tidal power facility in Russia and has the fourth largest capacity (1.7 MW) among the world's tidal power plants.

Plans for constructing an 800 MW tidal power plant in the Barents Sea were announced in 2008. Possible long-term projects include the Penzhin Tidal Power Plant, which could become the largest power station in the world, with an installed capacity of up to 87 GW and an annual production of 200 TWh.

== Biofuel ==
Russia's biofuel industry is new, but it has been developing rapidly in recent years. Russia is one of the largest grain producers, has a well-developed ethyl alcohol industry and has increasing rapeseed (often used to create biodiesel) production rates. The Russian government declared in 2008 that it would play an active role in developing the biofuel industry by building 30 new biofuel plants and providing tax breaks and subsidized interest rates to biofuel energy projects. Although these plans were delayed, on 13 September 2010, Medvedev announced that construction would begin in early 2011. Biobutanol, the biofuel produced by these plants, would be produced from timber by-products, such as woodchips and sawdust.

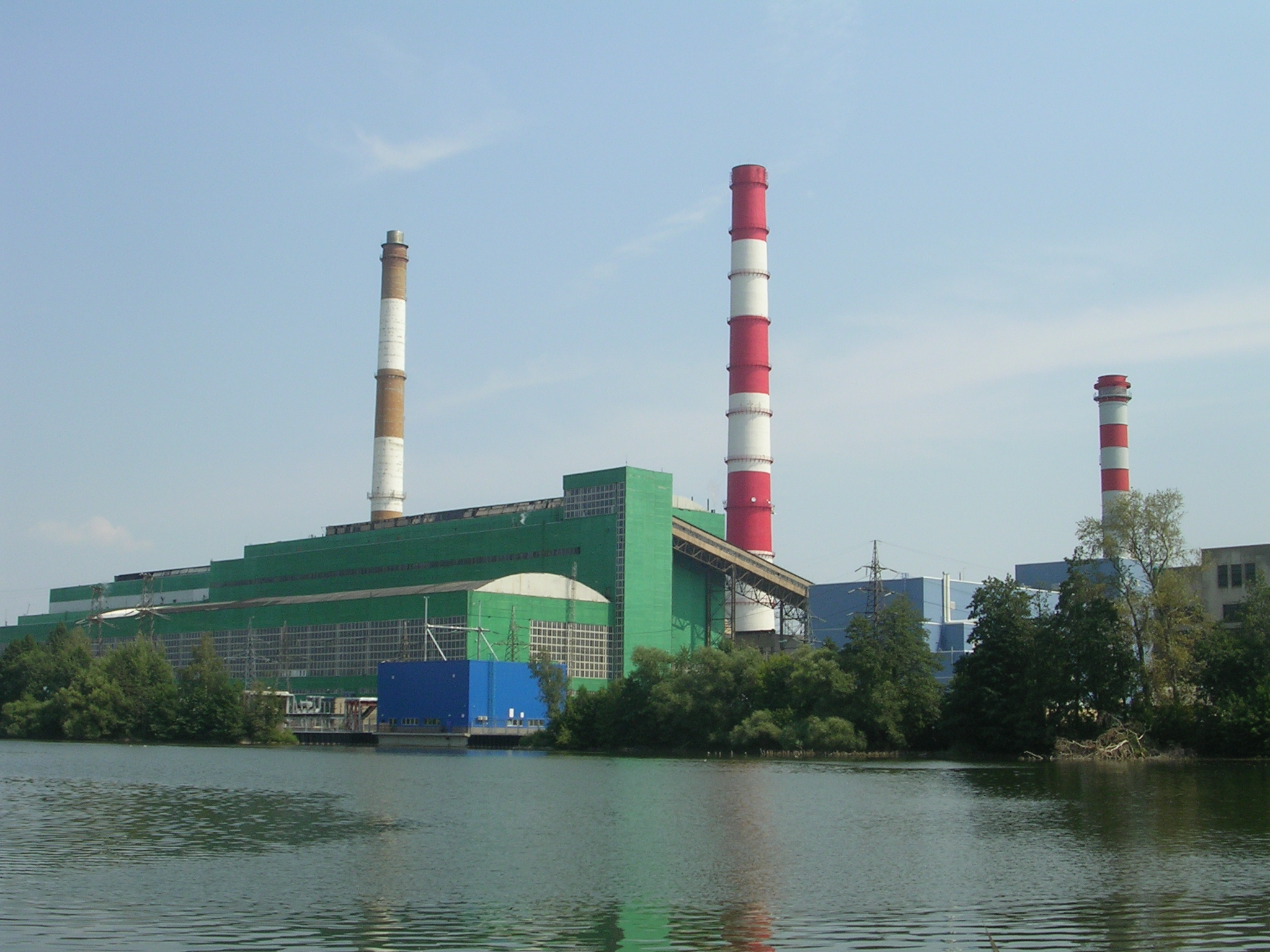
Shatura Power Station has the largest peat power capacity in the world.

Lada, a Russian car manufacturer, produced its first biofuel-powered automobile in November 2010. Deputy Transportation Minister Valery Okulov stated that Russian companies are currently developing helicopters that run on biofuel. The country's Biotechnology Corporation estimates that Russia is capable of exporting 40 million tons of biofuel annually.

== Biomass ==
Biomass is already used in some parts of Russia to provide a total of 1%, or 9 TWh/year, of Russia's total energy. However, due to Russia's vast forest and peat reserves, (Note: Peat is not universally recognized as renewable biomass resource, due to its long regeneration period.) it has a total biomass technical potential of 431 TWh/year, of which 285 TWh/year is economically feasible. Most of this potential is found in northwestern Russia, which has a developed pulp and paper industry that can provide wood-based waste to use as biomass energy.

Use of peat for energy production was prominent during the Soviet Union, with the peak occurring in 1965 and declining from that point. In 1929, over 40% of the Soviet Union's electric energy came from peat, which dropped to 1% by 1980. Currently, Russia is responsible for 17% of the world's peat production, and 20% of the peat that it produces, 1.5 million tons, is used for energy purposes. Shatura Power Station in Moscow Oblast and Kirov Power Station in Kirov Oblast are the two largest peat power stations in the world.

== See also ==
- Climate change in Russia
- Coal in Russia
- Oil in Russia
- Gas in Russia
- Nuclear power in Russia
- Energy policy of Russia
- Geothermal power in Russia
- Wind power in Russia
- List of power stations in Russia
- Renewable energy by country
