= Sayano-Shushenskaya Dam =

Hydroelectric dam in Russia

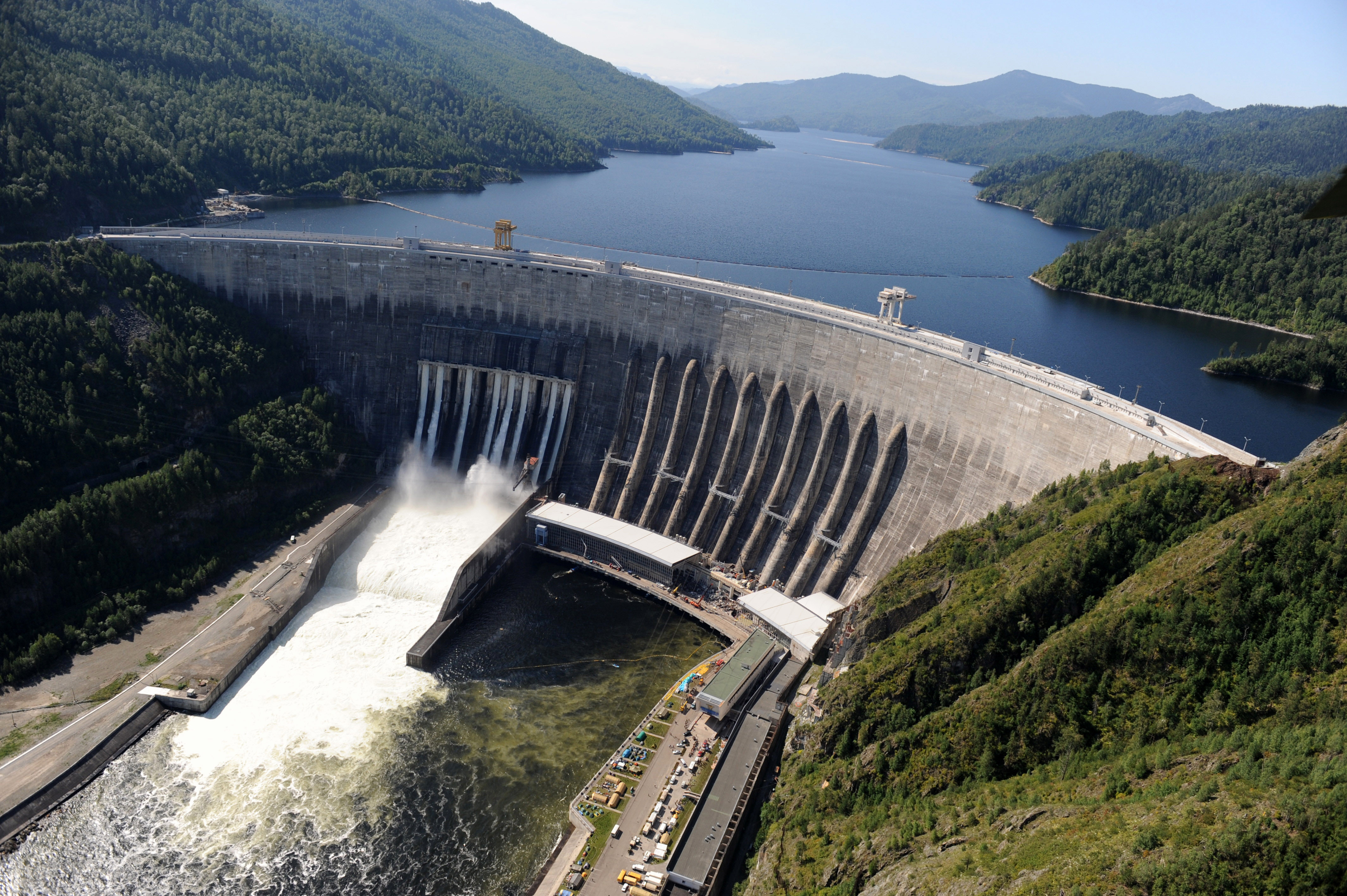

- Location within Russia
- Interactive map of Sayano-Shushenskaya Dam
- Location: Sayanogorsk, Khakassia, Russia
- Coordinates: 52°49′33″N 91°22′13″E
- Construction began: 1963
- Opening date: 1978–1985
- Operator: RusHydro

Dam and spillways
- Type of dam: Arch-gravity dam
- Impounds: Yenisei River
- Height: 242 m (794 ft)
- Length: 1,066 m (3,497 ft)
- Width (crest): 25 m (82 ft)
- Width (base): 105.7 m (347 ft)
- Spillway capacity: 13,600 m^{3}/s (480,000 cu ft/s)

Reservoir
- Creates: Sayano-Shushenskoe reservoir
- Total capacity: 31.3 km^{3} (7.5 mi^{3})
- Surface area: 621 km^{2} (240 mi^{2})

Power Station
- Type: Conventional
- Hydraulic head: 194 m (636 ft)
- Turbines: 10 × 640 MW
- Installed capacity: 6,400 MW
- Annual generation: 23.5 TWh

The Sayano-Shushenskaya Dam (Russian: Сая́но-Шу́шенская гидроэлектроста́нция, Sayano-Shushenskaya Hydroelektrostantsiya) is located on the Yenisei River, near Sayanogorsk in Khakassia, Russia. It is the largest power plant in Russia and the 12th-largest hydroelectric plant in the world, by average power generation. The full legal name of the power plant, OJSC [Open Joint-Stock Society] P. S. Neporozhny Sayano-Shushenskaya HPP [hydro power plant], refers to the Soviet era Minister of Energy and Electrification Pyotr Neporozhny. As of 2009 the head of the power plant was Valery Kyari.

== Description ==
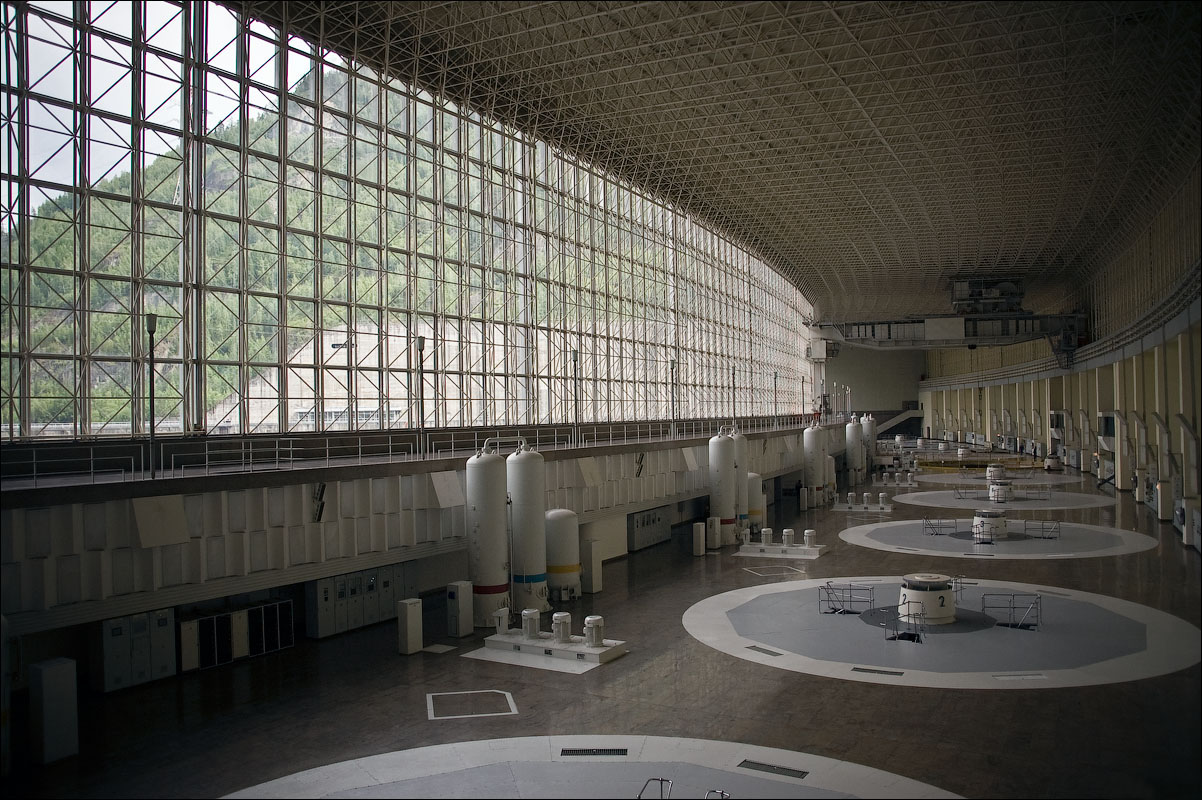
Generator hall of Sayano-Shushenskaya Dam.

The plant is operated by RusHydro. As of 2009, it was the largest power plant in Russia and the world's sixth-largest hydroelectric plant by average power generation. It provides more than a quarter of RusHydro's generation capacity. The plant operated ten type РО-230/833-0-677 hydro turbines manufactured at the Leningradsky Metallichesky Zavod, each with a capacity of 640 MW at 194-metre (636 ft) head. The total installed capacity of the plant is 6.4 GW; its average annual production is 23.5 TWh, which peaked in 2021 at 29.4 TWh.

The station's constructions include the dam, a power plant building located near the dam, and an additional spillway which is under construction. The arch-gravity dam is 242 metres (794 ft) high. It has a crest length of 1,066 metres (3,497 ft), crest width of 25 metres (82 ft), base width of 105.7 metres (347 ft) and maximum head of 220 metres (720 ft). It consists of a solid left-bank dam 246.1 metres (807 ft) long, a power dam 331.8 metres (1,089 ft) long, a spillway dam 189.6 metres (622 ft) long and a solid right-bank dam 298.5 metres (979 ft) long. It is by far the larger of only two gravity-arch dams in Russia. Water pressure for the dam is approximately 30 million tons, of which 60% is neutralized by the dam's own weight and 40% is carried to rock on the bank

The dam is constructed to "safely" withstand earthquakes up to 8 on the Richter scale, and was recorded by the Guinness Book of World Records for the strongest construction of its type.

The dam supports the Sayano-Shushenskoe reservoir, with a total capacity of 31.34 km^{3}, useful capacity of 15.34 km^{3} and surface area of 621 km^{2} (240 sq mi).

== Economic value ==
The station is the largest one contributing to peak consumption in the Unified Energy Systems of Russia. More than 70% of generated electrical power goes to Rusal's four smelters in Siberia.

In years of heavy rainfall, about 1,600–2,000 GWh are lost due to lack of high-voltage line transmission capacity, and some water bypasses the turbines. To avert this, a new aluminium plant was started on 15 December 2006.

== History ==
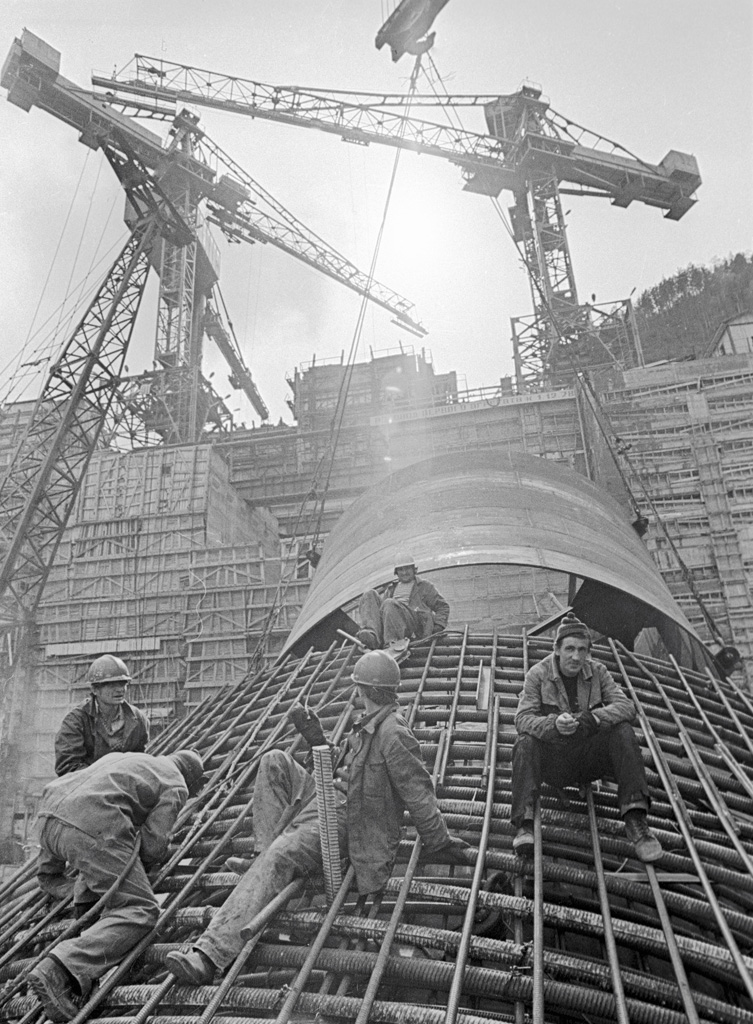
Construction of the Sayano-Shushenskaya Dam, 1978

The decision to build the power station was taken in 1960. On 4 November 1961, geologists reached the area, and an exact location was chosen. Construction started in 1963 and the first turbine went online on 18 December 1978. The plant became fully operational in December 1985. It was partially reconstructed in 1987 and in 1991. The plant was designed by the Leningrad (now Saint Petersburg) branch of the Hydroproject (Гидропроект, Gidroproyekt) institute, Lenhydroproject.

Following the collapse of the Soviet Union, the power plant was privatized in 1993, with RAO UES becoming the main shareholder. In April 2003, the Government of Khakassia by the initiative of the governor Alexei Lebed filed a suit to invalidate the deal. In April 2004, the East Siberian Arbitration invalidated the deal; however, it was overruled by the Supreme Arbitration Court.

The plant was closed after an accident on 17 August 2009. Some of the old turbines were subsequently restarted temporarily, but all are being sequentially replaced with updated more efficient equipment. As of Nov. 2014, all 10 generators are operational.

== Stability concerns ==
In 1998, the Russian Emergency Situations Ministry claimed that the "station construction [had] dangerously changed" and that the dam wall might not withstand the repeatedly increasing pressures of the annual spring floods. Since the basement of the dam is weakened, the 30 million tons of water pressure is not divided with 40% to the shore rocks and 60% to the dam's own weight as originally designed. Most of the water pressure and probably some of the dam's own weight is driven to the shore rocks since the dam is not constructed to withstand such pressure division.

There were also problems with increasing water filtration through dam concrete. In 1993 the French company "Soletanche Bachy" impregnated dam constructions with resins after which the filtration was reduced and situation improved substantially. In later times the impregnation was repeated by Russian companies.

In 1996 the concrete was repaired on the reservoir side at levels from 344 to 388 meters At the same time, the soil under the dam and supporting it from sides, was impregnated to decrease the water filtration.

In 2004, BBC Monitoring quoted a Russian TV news report as saying that the dam operators had been forced to construct an extra water intake wall to alleviate the spring flood pressures.

On 8 September 2009, the Accounts Chamber of the Russian Federation disclosed that the power station was audited in 2007 and that 85% of all technological equipment needed to be replaced. An official notification was sent to the government and the Prosecutor General's Office.

On 11 September 2009, RusHydro made an announcement about the dam's status, saying that the dam is not dangerous as there are around 11,000 sensors in 10 longitudinal galleries in it, and that all dam sections are under continuous monitoring. According to RusHydro, displacements of the dam are both seasonally reversible and irreversible. The movements have been reduced in recent years. The maximum displacement (141.5 millimetres (5.57 in)) was recorded in 2006 at dam central section No 33, which however was below the allowed maximum of 145.5 millimetres (5.73 in). According to RusHydro, the scope of displacement between the anchor legs and the machinery hall does not exceed 2.3 millimetres (0.091 in), which is less than the width between them (50 millimetres (2.0 in)), and therefore the dam cannot overwhelm the machinery hall. Also, according to RusHydro the dam is constructed for forces 2.4 times stronger than the actual forces on it are. The spillway is constructed for maximum output 13,600 m^{3}/s, the maximum real water spill can be 7,000–7,500 m^{3}/s as the higher spill will flood villages below the dam.

=== Speculation ===
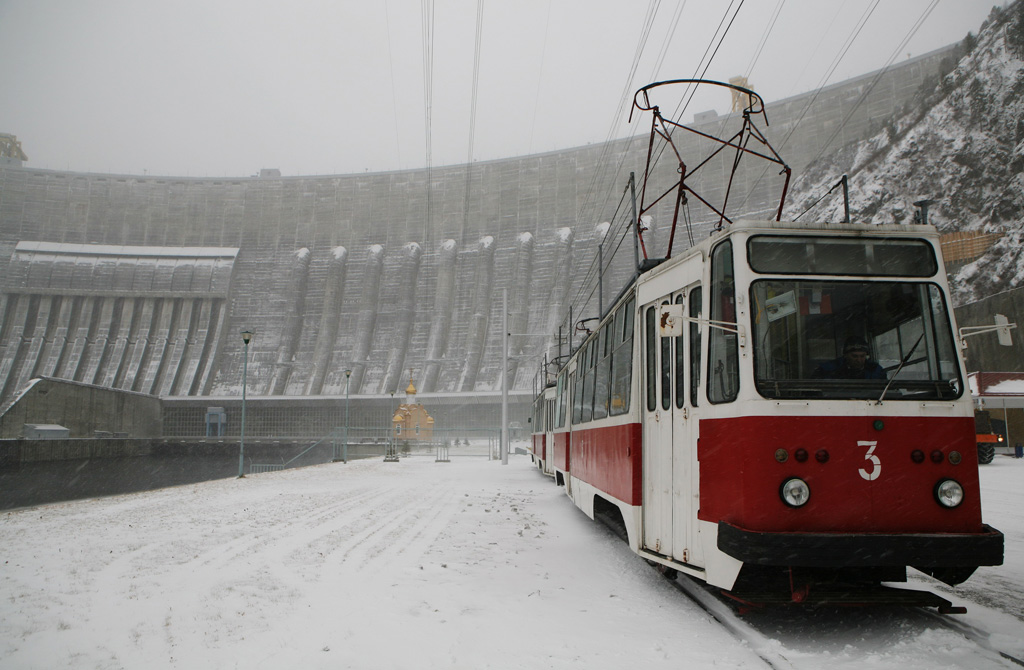
The Sayano-Shushenskaya Dam is served by a tram line that links with the town of Cheryomushki

The official RusHydro assessment was deemed overly optimistic by the opposition. The dam, which has no major flood control structures upstream, must bear the brunt of spring freshets, and due to a snowy winter and late thaw, in the first week of June 2010 the amount of spring flood water influx was about twice the normal (peaking at 9,700 m^{3}/s on 5 June and expected to stay around 7,000 m^{3}/s throughout the second and third weeks of June). Due to the August 2009 accident, only 2 out of 10 turbines were operable and capable of routing only 690 m^{3}/s of water. Consequently, most of the water influx into the reservoir must be drained through a poorly designed spillway, which previously had already suffered extensive damage as a result of spring floods in 1985 and 1988. As of 8 June, drainage through the spillway was roughly 5,000 m^{3}/s. While it would be possible to increase the spillway drain to 7,000–7,500 m^{3}/s, such an operation was previously deemed unsafe to the structure, and could result in further erosion of the dam's already weakened foundation even as the reservoir continues to fill. The damage would occur by direct impact of the falling water to the spill well (which, once its concrete slab lining were destroyed, would expose and erode the dam's bedrock support) as well as by intense vibrations created by the waterfall, which the concrete dam, lacking steel reinforcement, is not designed to withstand for prolonged periods. To date, only one section of the bypass spillway had been completed, and was capable of routing only 2,000 m^{3}/s of water, meaning that the main spillway, probably already worn and torn from the 2009 winter's heavy ice deposition on the dam, must continue to be operated for some time before repairs will be possible.

This situation has led some of the local population to petition for controlled draining of the reservoir and deconstruction of the dam, since the consequences of the dam's failure, should it occur, would be catastrophic. The resulting flood wave, which could be from 50 to 200 m high near the breach and moving at up to 200 km/h, would destroy the downstream Maynskaya HPP in a matter of minutes; the nearby town of Sayanogorsk would be flooded in under half an hour, and the heavily populated area including Abakan and Minusinsk (altogether more than 200,000 people)—within 40 minutes to several hours. After reaching the Krasnoyarskaya HPP further downstream, the flood wave would rise its reservoir by roughly 10 m and spill over its dam, destroying the power plant machinery. If that dam should fail too (the possibility of which exists in this scenario), the resulting mass of water could wash away the city of Krasnoyarsk and its suburbs, drowning or displacing their population of over 1,000,000.

== Accidents ==
=== 1979 accident ===
On 23 May 1979, spring flood water entered into the machine hall and flooded the first working turbine unit. The turbine was restarted on 4 July 1979. The dam had not yet been completed.

=== 1985 accident ===
A powerful spring flood destroyed 80% of the concrete spillway bottom plate, tearing apart 50-millimetre (2.0 in)-thick anchor bolts and carving seven meters deep into the bedrock.

=== 1988 accident ===
A powerful spring flood destroyed the spillway well. As a result, working headway for the future was reduced by five meters.

=== 2009 accident ===
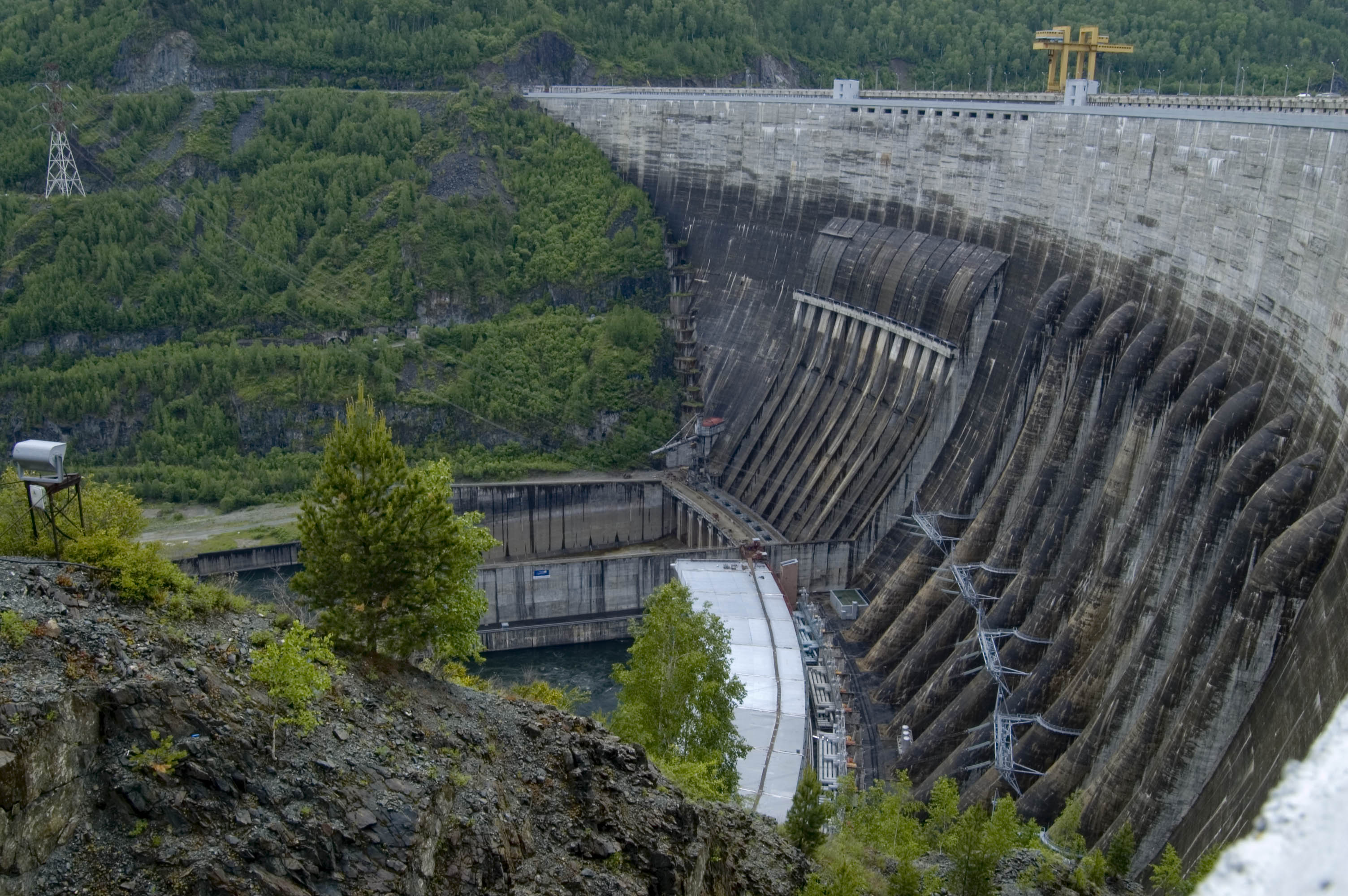
Sayano-Shushenskaya hydroelectric power station in 2007.

On 17 August 2009 at 8:13 AM, the hydro-electric plant suffered a catastrophic accident that caused flooding of the engine and turbine rooms, and two 711 MVA electric generators to explode underwater as a result of a short circuit. All other machinery was damaged to some extent, with only four hydro-aggregates ultimately recoverable; the remaining six required replacement. As of 10 September 2009, 75 people, including 1 pregnant woman, were confirmed dead, while one person was still listed as missing forty days after the disaster.

Power generation from the station ceased completely following the incident, with the resulting blackout in residential areas being alleviated by diverting power from other plants. Aluminium smelters in Sayanogorsk and Khakassia were completely cut off from the grid before power supplies were replaced using alternative power sources. Russia warned that in the longer term it might lose up to 500,000 tons of aluminum output due to the power shortage, and called for accelerating the construction of the Boguchanskaya hydroelectric power station to replace lost generating capacity.

The accident caused an oil spill with at least 40 tonnes of transformer oil released, spreading over 80 km (50 mi) downstream of Yenisei.

The plant restarted operations on 24 February 2010, while repairs were complete by November 2014. According to Russian Energy Minister Sergei Shmatko the rebuilding of the engine room alone would cost $1.2 billion.

Dam subcontractor Gidroelectroremont's chief accountant has been accused by the Khakassia police of embezzling 24 million rubles from the funds allocated by RusHydro for repairing the dam.

==== Official report summary ====
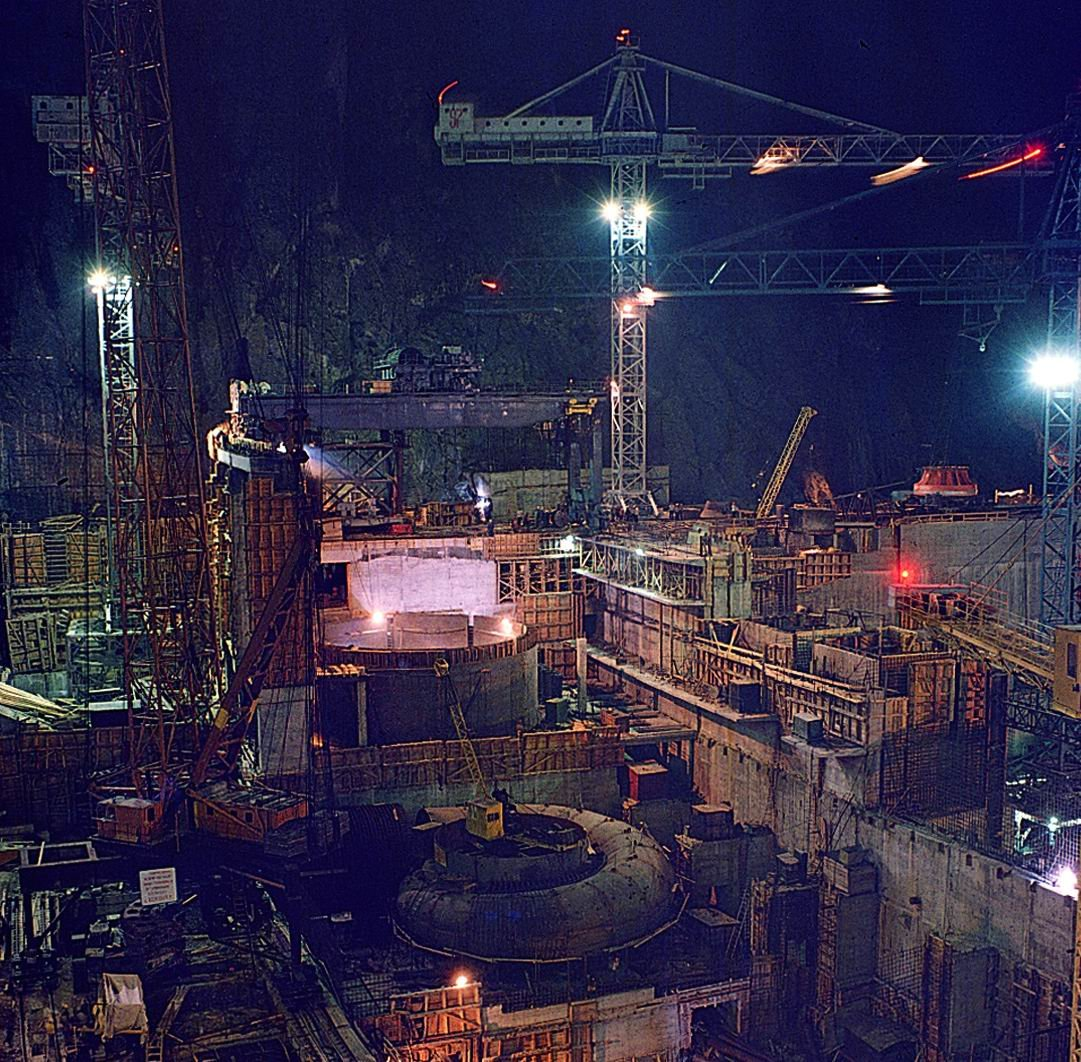
Construction of the station and montage of turbine 2.

On 3 October 2009 the official Sayano-Shushenskaya accident report was published. In summary, it states that the accident was primarily caused by vibrations of turbine No. 2 which led to fatigue damage of the turbine mountings, including its cover. The report found that at the moment of the accident, the nuts on at least 6 bolts keeping the turbine cover in place were absent. After the accident, 49 found bolts were investigated: 41 had fatigue cracks. On 8 bolts, the fatigue-damaged area exceeded 90% of the total cross-sectional area.

On the day of the accident, turbine No. 2 worked as the plant's power output regulator. At 8:12 the turbine No. 2 output power was reduced by an automatic turbine regulator, and turbine No. 2 entered into a dangerous power-band given the head pressure that day. Shortly afterwards the bolts keeping the turbine No. 2 cover in place broke. Under the 20 atmospheres of water pressure, the spinning turbine, with its cover, rotor, and upper parts, jumped out of the casing, destroying the machinery hall, the equipment in it, and the building.

Pressurized water immediately flooded the rooms, and caused damage to the plant. At the same time, an alarm was received at the power station's main control panel, and the power output fell to zero, resulting in a local blackout. It took 25 minutes to manually close the water gates to the other turbines; since the power distribution equipment was destroyed, during that time, they continued to spin without load. This means they considerably exceeded their maximum safe spin rate.

== See also ==
- Hydroelectricity in Russia
- Energy policy of Russia
- List of largest hydroelectric power stations
- List of largest power stations in the world
- List of conventional hydroelectric power stations
- List of power stations in Russia
