= Lenhydroproject =

Research institute

- Type: Joint-stock company
- Founded: 1917
- Headquarters: Saint Petersburg, Russia
- Revenue: $19.4 million (2017)
- Operating income: $666,560 (2017)
- Net income: $479,408 (2017)
- Total assets: $22.6 million (2017)
- Total equity: $9.95 million (2017)
- Owner: RusHydro (100%)
- Parent: RusHydro

Lenhydroproject (Russian: Ленгидропроект) is a major research and design institute for hydrotechnology and hydroelectric engineering based in St. Petersburg, Russia. Since 1993 it is incorporated as a "JSC Lenhydroproject", part of RusHydro company.

The institute traces its history to the "Northern Russia hydro resources investigation team" established in April 1917 for research of rivers for the Ministry of Railroads.

== Projects ==
=== Power stations ===
- Sayano–Shushenskaya hydroelectric power station
- Krasnoyarsk hydroelectric power station
- Narva Hydroelectric Station
- Zeya Hydroelectric Station
- Votkinsk Hydroelectric Station (Votkinsk Reservoir)
- Chirkey Hydroelectric Station
- Ust-Srednekan Hydroelectric Plant

=== Dams of height over 100m ===
- Sayano-Shushensk Dam (242 m)
- Chirkey Dam (232 m)
- Bureya Dam (140 m)
- Kolyma Dam (126 m)
- Krasnoyarsk Dam (124 m)
- Zeya Dam (115 m)
- Irganai Dam (101 m)
