= Mayna, Republic of Khakassia =

Mayna Майна
- Work settlement
- Interactive map of Mayna
- Location of Mayna Mayna (Khakassia)
- Coordinates: 53°00′01″N 91°28′56″E
- Country: Russia
- Federal subject: Khakassia
- Founded: 1732

Population (2010 Census)
  - Total: 5,062
  - Estimate (2021): 4,325 (−14.6%)

Administrative status
  - Subordinated to: town of republican significance of Sayanogorsk

Municipal status
  - Urban okrug: Sayanogorsky Urban Okrug
- Time zone: UTC+7 (MSK+4)
- Postal code: 655614
- OKTMO ID: 95708000056

Mayna (Russian: Майна) is an urban locality (urban-type settlement) under the administrative jurisdiction of the town of republican significance of Sayanogorsk of the Republic of Khakassia, Russia. Population: 5,062 (2010 census); 5,365 (2002 census); 6,328 (1989 Soviet census).
