= Sayanogorsk =

Town in the Republic of Khakassia, Russia

Sayanogorsk Саяногорск
- Town

Other transcription(s)
  - Khakas: Наа Сойан Тура
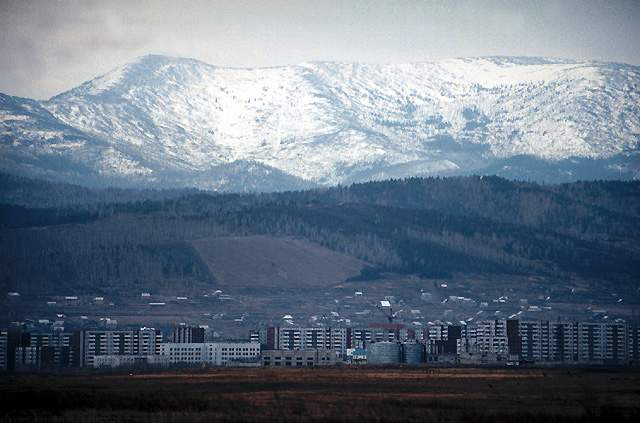
- Sayanogorsk

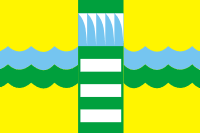
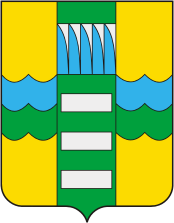
- Flag Coat of arms
- Interactive map of Sayanogorsk
- Location of Sayanogorsk Sayanogorsk (Khakassia)
- Coordinates: 53°03′N 91°27′E
- Country: Russia
- Federal subject: Khakassia
- Founded: November 6, 1975
- Town status since: November 6, 1975
- Elevation: 300 m (980 ft)

Population (2010 Census)
  - Total: 49,887
  - Estimate (2025): 43,726 (−12.3%)

Administrative status
  - Subordinated to: Town of Sayanogorsk
  - Capital of: Town of Sayanogorsk

Municipal status
  - Urban okrug: Sayanogorsk Urban Okrug
  - Capital of: Sayanogorsk Urban Okrug
- Time zone: UTC+7 (MSK+4)
- Postal codes: 655602, 655603
- Dialing code: +7 39042
- OKTMO ID: 95708000001
- Website: sayan-adm.ru

Sayanogorsk (Russian: Саяногорск; Khakas: Наа Сойан Тура, romanized: Nâ Soyan Tura) is a town in the Republic of Khakassia, Russia, located on the left bank of the Yenisei River, 80 kilometers (50 mi) south of Abakan, the capital of the republic. Population: 49,887 (2010 census); 50,255 (2002 census); 50,188 (1989 Soviet census).

== Geography ==
The town has road and water links with Abakan and Minusinsk. The town itself is located in the steppe zone.

=== Climate ===
Moderately sharp continental climate. Annual precipitation: 250–300 mm. Fall mainly in the warm period. Average temperature in July: +28.6 °C (83.5 °F) Average temperature in January: −27.0 °C (−16.6 °F) Vegetation period: 160 days.

== History ==
Sayanogorsk was founded on November 6, 1975, in connection with the construction of the Sayan-Shushenskaya Hydroelectric Power Plant on the Yenisei River and the Sayan Aluminum Plant in the town; the latter opened ten years later.

== Administrative and municipal status ==
Within the framework of administrative divisions, it is, together with two work settlements (Cheremushki and Mayna) and one rural locality (the village of Bogoslovka), incorporated as the Town of Sayanogorsk—an administrative unit with the status equal to that of the districts. As a municipal division, the Town of Sayanogorsk is incorporated as Sayanogorsk Urban Okrug.

== Economy ==
Despite being a small town, Sayanogorsk is located near to the Khakas Aluminium Smelter, one of the largest aluminum smelter plants in the world. The aluminum plant provides work for the majority of the town's residents. Sayano-Shushenskaya Dam, the largest hydro-electric dam in Russia and the world's 5th-largest by installed capacity, lies to the south of the town.

== Culture ==
=== Education ===
The town has ten schools, a subsidiary of KSU, a subsidiary of TUSUR, Stam, www.wtu.ru, Sayanogorsk Polytechnic College, South-Siberian Regional College.

=== Media ===
==== Television ====
In Sayanogorsk there is one local channel TV-7, on which there are broadcasts are on TV channel STS (TV Channel).

==== Newspapers ====
Sayanogorsk publishes many periodicals some are "Environment", "Sayanogorsk Courier", "Sayan statements", and "Business Sayanogorsk.

=== Sports ===
The volleyball club "Borus" is based in Sayanogorsk.

The bandy player Yevgeny Shadrin was born in Sayanogorsk.

=== Tourism and recreation ===
The Ski resort "Gladenkaya" is in Sayanogorsk.

== Industry ==
The main industrial enterprises of the town are: Sayan Aluminum Plant - has Production of primary aluminum and alloys on its basis Khakas aluminum plant - has production of primary aluminum and alloys on its basis, Plant Rusal SAYANAL - has production of aluminum foil and packing materials on its basis, Company Stroyservice Company Sayanstroy Plant Sayanmoloko and JSC Branch Temporary Use - has the enterprise of industrial railway transport. The town is economically dependent on the Rusal-operated aluminum plant.

=== Energy ===
Sayano-Shushenskaya GES (starting the second hydraulic unit 1-December 18, 1978), Mainsk HPS.

== See also ==
- Sayano-Shushenskaya Dam
- 2009 Sayano-Shushenskaya power station accident
