= Sayano-Shushenskaya power station accident =

2009 turbine failure at a hydroelectric power station in Russia

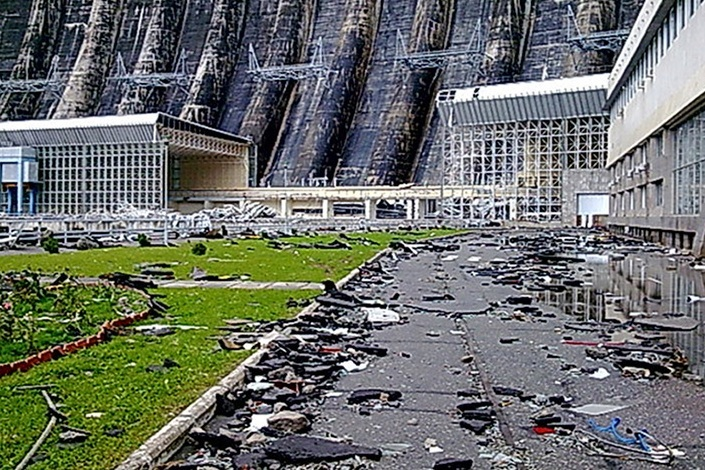
- The power station after the accident, with the roof of the turbine hall partially collapsed
- Date: 17 August 2009
- Time: 08:13 KRAST (UTC+8)
- Location: Sayano-Shushenskaya Dam, near Sayanogorsk, Khakassia, Russia; 52°49′38″N 91°22′15″E
- Deaths: 75

On 17 August 2009, a turbine in the hydroelectric power station of the Sayano-Shushenskaya Dam near Sayanogorsk in Russia failed catastrophically, killing 75 people and severely damaging the plant. The turbine hall was flooded, and a section of its roof collapsed. All but one of the ten turbines in the hall were destroyed or damaged. The entire power output of the plant, totalling 6,400 megawatts, was lost, leading to widespread power outages in the area. An official report on the accident was released in October 2009.

== Background ==
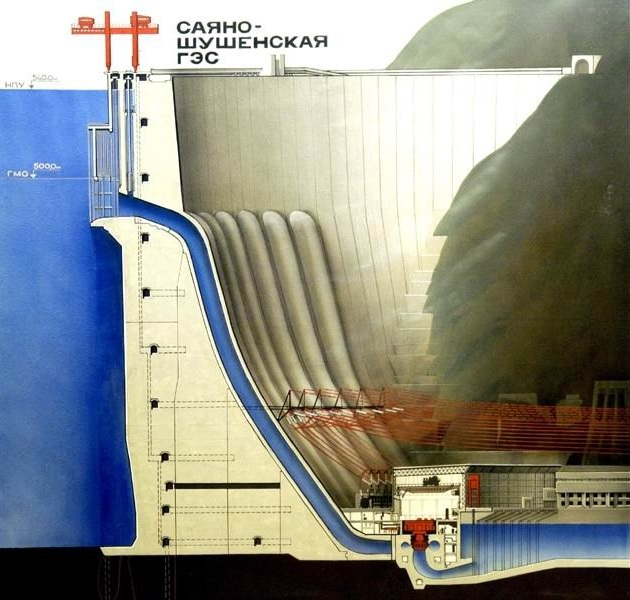
Cross-section of the Sayano-Shushenskaya Dam

The Sayano-Shushenskaya Dam is located on the Yenisey River in south-central Siberia, Russia, about 30 kilometres (19 mi) south of Sayanogorsk, Khakassia. Before the accident, it was the largest hydroelectric power station in Russia and the sixth-largest in the world by average power generation. On 2 July 2009, RusHydro, the power station's operator, announced the station's all-time highest electricity output over 24 hours.

=== Turbine 2 ===
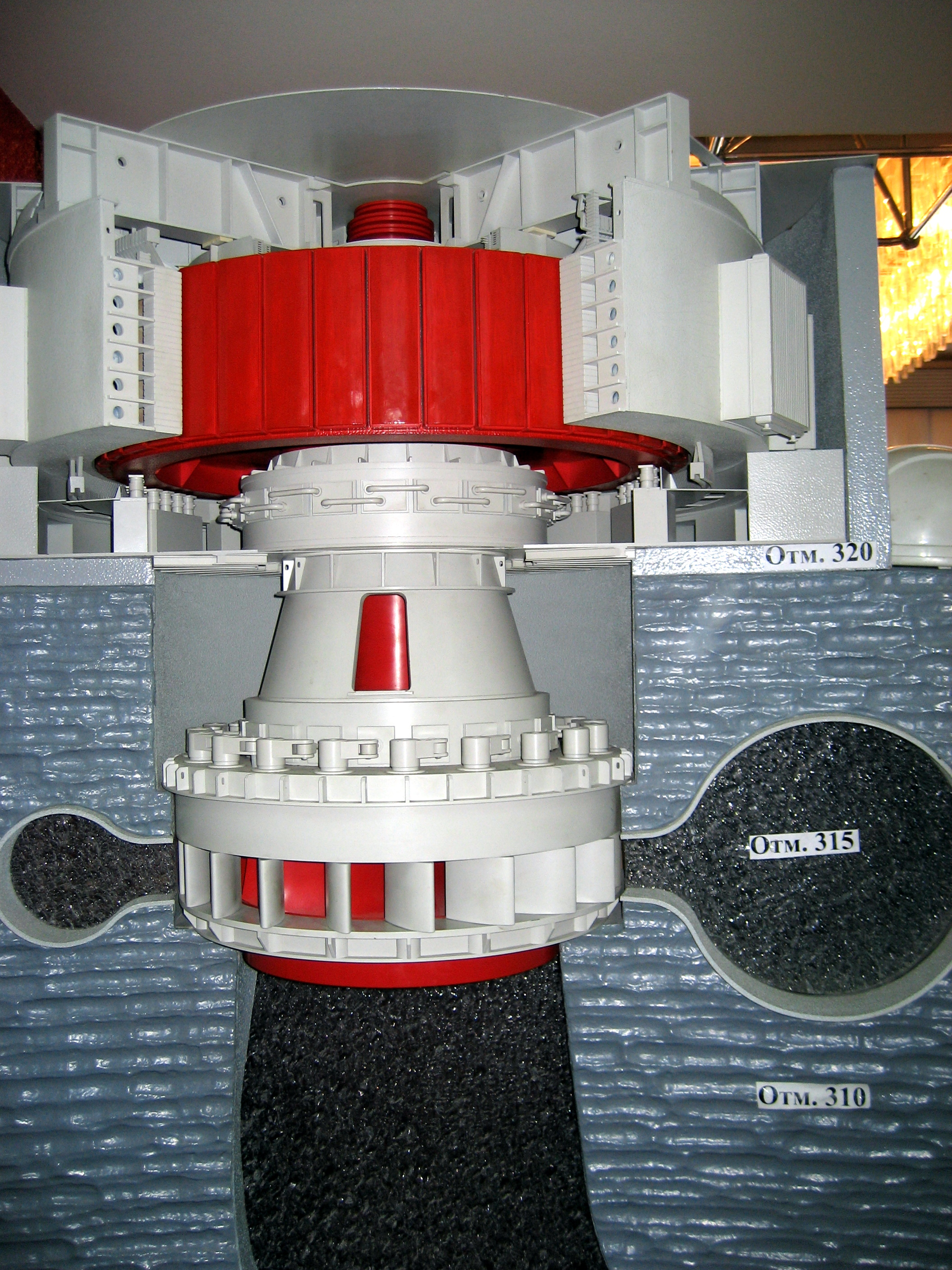
A model of a power unit, comprising turbine and generator, of the Sayano-Shushenskaya power plant

Turbines of the type used in this power plant have a very narrow working band at high efficiency regimes. If this band is exceeded the turbines begin to vibrate, caused by the pulsation of water flow and water strokes. These vibrations and shocks cause the turbines to degrade over time.

Turbine 2 had experienced problems for a long time prior to the 2009 accident. The first of these appeared after its installation in 1979. Throughout 1980–1983, numerous problems with seals, turbine shaft vibrations and bearings surfaced. From the end of March to the end of November 2000, a complete reconditioning of turbine 2 was performed. Cavities up to 12 millimetres (0.47 in) deep and cracks up to 130 millimetres (5.1 in) long were found on the turbine runner and repaired. Many other defects were found in the turbine bearings and subsequently repaired. In 2005, further repairs were made to turbine 2. The problems found were similar in several aspects to the defects observed during the previous repair.

From January to March 2009, turbine 2 was undergoing scheduled repairs and modernization. It was the first and only turbine in the station which was equipped with a new electro-hydraulic regulator of its rotational speed supplied by the Promavtomatika company. During the course of the repair, the turbine blades were welded, because after a long period of operation, cracks and cavities had once again appeared. The turbine runner was not properly rebalanced after these repairs, following which turbine 2 had increased vibrations, c. 0.15 mm (0.006 in) runout for the main bearing during the full load of the turbine. While this did not exceed specifications, the increased vibrations were unacceptable for long term use. The elevated vibration levels compared to other turbines had been apparent for turbine 2 before the repair as well. The vibrations exceeded the allowed specification in the beginning of July and continued to increase with accelerated speed.

On the night of 16–17 August, the level of vibration increased substantially, and there were several attempts to stop the turbine. During 16 August up to 20:30, the load of turbine 2 was 600 MW, then it was reduced to 100–200 MW. On 17 August 2009 at 03:00, the load was increased again to 600 MW; at 03:30, the load was decreased to 200 MW; and at 03:45, it was increased again to 600 MW. During this time, the level of vibration was very high, and was also registered by seismic instruments in the plant. During attempts to shut it down, the rotor inside the turbine was pushed upward, which in turn created pressure pushing up on the turbine cover, which was kept in place by 80 bolts, each 8 cm in diameter.

During the morning of 17 August 2009, 50 people were gathered around turbine 2. As the plant general director, Nikolai Nevolko, was celebrating his anniversary, early in the morning he went to Abakan to greet the arriving guests, and none of the workers present wanted, or had the authority, to make decisions about further actions regarding the turbine. It seems they were used to the high levels of vibration.

Turbine 2 was started on 16 August 2009 at 23:14 local time. At 23:44 it was running at a full load of 600 MW. During the night, its load varied between 10 and 610 MW. At the moment of the accident, which was 08:13 local time (00:13 GMT), its load was 475 MW and water consumption was 256 m^{3}/s (9,000 cu ft/s). Vibration of the bearing was 0.84 mm (0.033 in), which exceeded the values of the other turbines by more than fourfold. The working life defined by the manufacturer for the turbines was specified as 30 years. At the moment of the accident, the age of the turbine was 29 years and 10 months.

On 17 August 2009, the turbines were at a head pressure of 212 metres (696 ft). At this pressure the recommended power band for the turbines is 570–640 MW (band III), and the allowed band is 0–265 MW also (band I). Band 265–570 MW (band II) at this pressure is not recommended, and output over 640 MW (band IV) is forbidden. On the day of the accident, turbine 2 was working as the plant's power output regulator and, due to this, its output power was changing constantly. The turbine often operated in the band II regime, which is accompanied by pulsation and strokes in the water flow.

== Accident ==
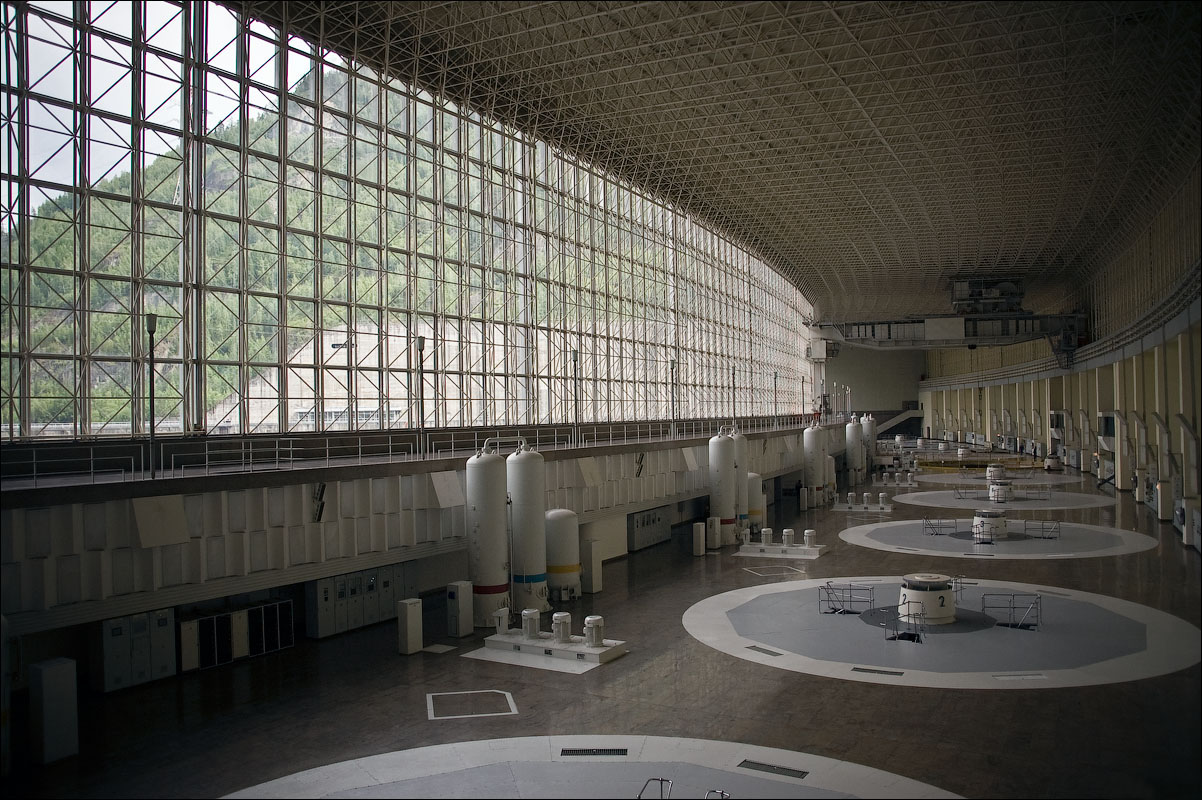
The turbine hall before and after the accident. Turbine No. 2, the one that failed, is visible in the foreground (left image).

The accident occurred on 17 August 2009 at 08:13 local time (00:13 GMT). There was a loud bang from turbine 2. The turbine cover shot up and the 920-tonne (910-long-ton; 1,010-short-ton) rotor then flew out of its seat. After this, water spouted from the cavity of the turbine into the machinery hall. As a result, the machinery hall and rooms below its level were flooded. At the same time, an alarm was received at the power station's main control panel, and the power output fell to zero, resulting in a local blackout. The steel gates to the water intake pipes of the turbines, weighing 150 tonnes (150 long tons; 170 short tons) each, were closed manually by opening the valves of hydraulic jacks keeping them up between 08:35 and 09:20 hours (09.30 by official report). The operation took 25 minutes, which is near the minimum time (highest speed) allowed for this operation. The emergency diesel generator was started at 11:32. At 11:50, the opening of 11 spillway gates of the dam to reroute the river's flow around the crippled turbines began, and was finished at 13:07. Seventy-five people were later found dead.

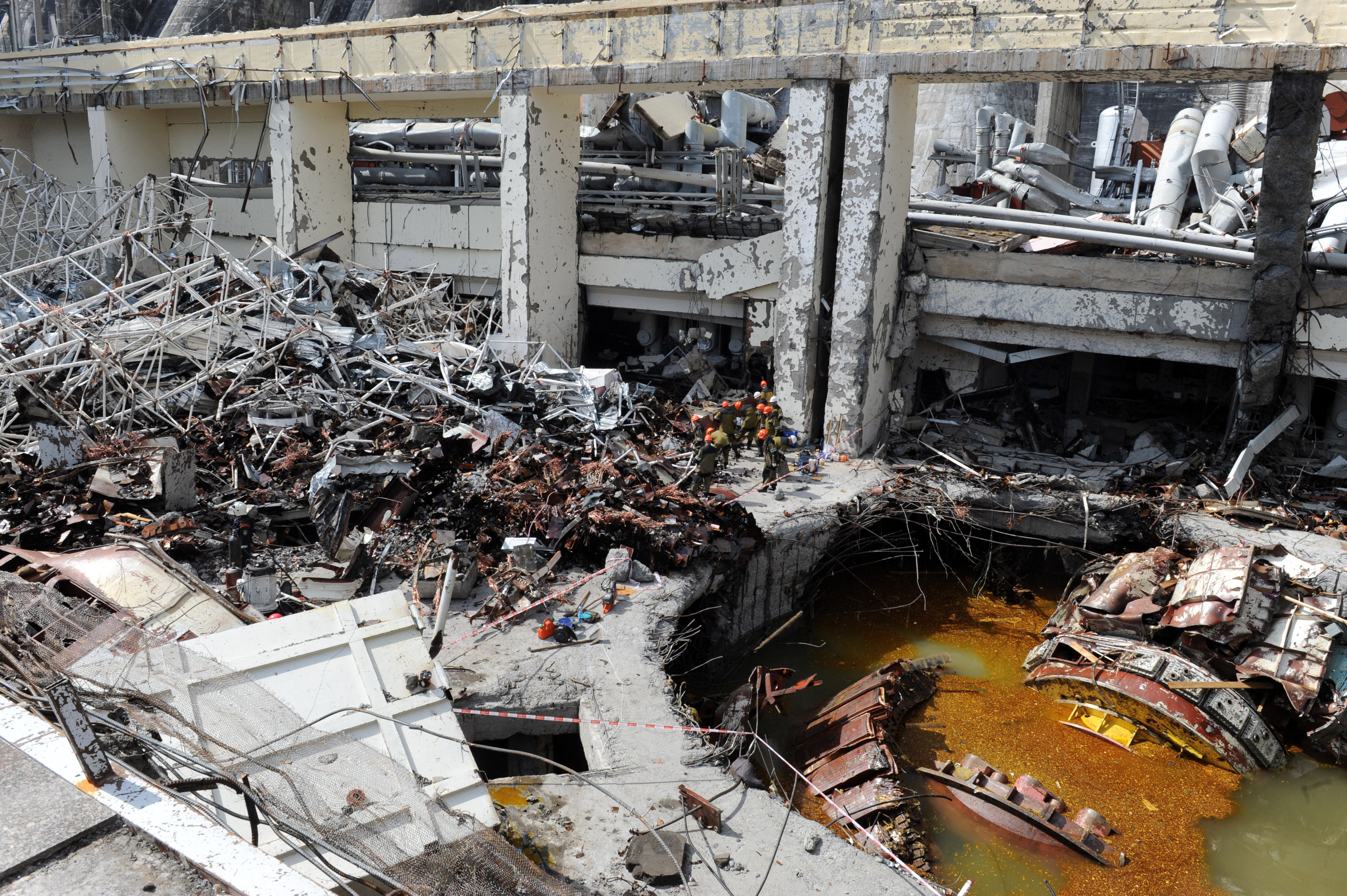
The wreckage of the failed turbine

Nine out of the ten turbines were operating at the time, with a total output 4,400 MW. Turbine 6 had been undergoing scheduled maintenance, but was ready for a restart.

Oleg Myakishev, a survivor of the accident, described it as follows:

...Я стоял наверху, услышал какой-то нарастающий шум, потом увидел, как поднимается, дыбится рифлёное покрытие гидроагрегата. Потом видел, как из-под него поднимается ротор. Он вращался. Глаза в это не верили. Он поднялся метра на три. Полетели камни, куски арматуры, мы от них начали уворачиваться... Рифлёнка была где-то под крышей уже, да и саму крышу разнесло... Я прикинул: поднимается вода, 380 кубов в секунду, и — дёру, в сторону десятого агрегата. Я думал, не успею, поднялся выше, остановился, посмотрел вниз — смотрю, как рушится всё, вода прибывает, люди пытаются плыть... Подумал, что затворы надо закрывать срочно, вручную, чтобы остановить воду... Вручную, потому что напряжения-то нет, никакие защиты не сработали...

[...I was standing upstairs when I heard some sort of growing noise, then I saw the corrugated turbine cover rise and stand on end. Then I saw the rotor rising from underneath it. It was spinning. I could not believe my eyes. It rose about three meters. Rocks and pieces of metal went flying; we started to dodge them... At that point the corrugated cover was nearly at roof level, and the roof itself had been destroyed... I made a mental calculation: the water is rising, 380 cubic meters per second, so I took to my heels and ran for the turbine 10. I thought that I wouldn't make it. I climbed higher, stopped, looked down, and saw everything getting destroyed, water coming in, people trying to swim... I thought: someone must urgently shut the gates to stop the water, manually... Manually, because there was no power, none of the protection systems had worked...]

On 9 September 2009 at 17:40 local time (09:40 GMT), a fire started in the turbine hall during repair work. Around 200 people were evacuated. There were no fatalities or injuries.

== Investigation ==
On 4 October 2009, the official report about Sayano-Shushenskaya hydro accident was published by the Federal Environmental, Technological and Atomic Supervisory Service (Rostekhnadzor) on its website. However, later the report and the press release on the report were removed from the website.

Names of people killed and those who bear responsibility for the accident, and other data including a historical and technical review about the plant and plans for its future, are given in the report. The report states that the accident was primarily caused by the turbine vibrations, which led to fatigue damage to the mountings of the turbine 2, including the turbine cover. It was also found that at the moment of accident at least six nuts were missing from the bolts securing the turbine cover. After the accident, 49 recovered bolts were investigated, of which 41 had fatigue cracks. On 8 bolts, the fatigue damaged area exceeded 90% of the total cross-sectional area.

The situation was recovered on 17 August 2009 at 15:03. At 08:12 local time, turbine 2's output power was reduced by the turbine regulator and it entered into the non-recommended powerband II. Shortly after this, the bolts keeping the turbine cover in place broke, and under water pressure of about 20 bars (2,000 kPa), the spinning turbine with its cover, rotor, and upper parts started to move up, destroying machinery hall installations. At the same time, pressurized water flooded rooms and damaged plant constructions.

According to this report, on 17 August 2009 at 01:20 (local time) there was a fire at the hydroelectric power station of Bratsk which broke both communications and the automatic driving systems of other power plants in the region, including Sayano-Shushenskaya.

According to Rostekhnadzor, the automatic shutdown system of the water intake pipes' gates failed after the turbine failure. This accusation was dismissed by Rakurs, the company which designed the automated safety system for the plant.

=== Media speculation ===
According to the newspaper Izvestia, the increased vibration of turbine 2 was going on for some 10 years and was well-known to the plant personnel. According to the former director of Irkutskenergo, Viktor Bobrovski, the accident could have been caused by an incorrect start-up process of the turbine which resulted in a hydraulic pressure surge, or excess load of the turbine caused by peak consumption of electricity. According to Bobrovski, it is common practice in the region to compensate for a peak load by overloading hydroelectric power plants. He also stated that the energy system of the region is near collapse, as the main goal of its owners is to take out as much profit as possible, typically by cutting down on maintenance, investment, safety, and educational costs. Since the load for other turbines ceased after the collapse of the turbine 2, they probably started to spin without load at increasing speed until they failed. He said that the former director of Sayano-Shushenskaya hydroelectric power station, Valentin Bryzgalov, had alerted that it is dangerous to operate the plant at its maximum loads when the turbines are starting to vibrate in the axial direction. He said that the accident probably would not have had such catastrophic results if the safety systems had worked and the safety rules had been followed.

The former general director of the plant, Alexander Toloshinov, has said that the accident was most likely due to a "manufacturing defect" in a turbine. According to Toloshinov, the construction of the turbine blades of this type of turbine is not very reliable and cracks are known to develop in them under some working conditions.

On 11 September 2009, RusHydro disputed allegations that the dam overwhelmed the machinery hall leading to the destruction of turbine 2. According to RusHydro, displacements of the dam are seasonal and have been reduced in recent years. The maximum displacement (141.5 millimetres or 5.57 inches) was recorded in 2006, which was below the allowed maximum of 145.5 mm (5.73 in). According to RusHydro, the scope of displacement between the anchor legs and the machinery hall does not exceed 2.3 mm (0.091 in), which is less than the width between them (50 mm or 2.0 in), and therefore the dam cannot overwhelm the machinery hall.

On 21 August 2009, a website supporting rebel groups in Chechnya claimed that they were responsible for the blast, part of a new "economic war" which they were declaring on Russia. These claims were dismissed by authorities as "idiotic".

A November 2010, peer-reviewed article in International Water Power and Dam Construction suggested a previously unpublicized direct cause for the turbine failures: draft tube water hammer. The immediate cause of this was proposed to be the too-sudden closure of the turbine wicket (flow-control) gates. Too-rapid closure results in rupture of the liquid column as the local pressure downstream of the gates drops to vapor pressure. This frees the draft tube liquid to first surge towards the tailrace and then reverse, eventually slamming rapidly into the turbine with great force. Only such a phenomenon seems capable of producing the extremely sudden, extremely large, and extremely vertical force which is evident from photographic and verbal descriptions of the damage. From the article:

This hypothesis is that the explosion was caused by water column separation in the draft tubes of the destroyed units. This condition can readily be caused by a too-rapid wicket gate closure during unit load rejection. Adjustment of governor times to unsafe values to achieve fast response to operating load changes may have occurred in recent times in response to a need to improve grid frequency control. This, combined with compromised stud connections due to poor maintenance, can explain the extreme violence of this accident.

A subsequent review for the 10th anniversary of the incident, published by the International Association for Hydro-Environment Engineering and Research (IAHR), concluded that no intervening revelations had lessened the feasibility of this explanation.

== Rescue operation ==
After the accident, the spillway was regulated to decrease the water level of the reservoir by 3 to 5 centimetres (1.2 to 2.0 in) per day. Flood water was pumped out from the engine room by 24 August 2009. On 28 August, the search and rescue operation was completed, and the state of emergency imposed in Khakassia on 17 August 2009, was lifted.

== Aftermath ==
As a result of the accident, 75 people were killed. On 19 August 2009, a mourning day was announced in Khakassia. RusHydro declared 25 August a day of mourning at the company. A festival in the city of Abakan on 22 August was canceled.

Due to the accident, the town of Cheryomushki banned the sale of strong alcoholic beverages.

=== Damage ===
In addition to turbine 2, turbines 7 and 9 also suffered severe damage and were destroyed, while the turbine room roof and ceilings fell on and caused additional damage to turbines 1 and 3, with slight damage to turbines 4, 5, 8, and 10. Turbine 6, which was in scheduled repair at the time of the accident, received only minor damage and was the only one of the station's 10 turbines that did not receive electrical damage due to shorting of the associated transformers. Water immediately flooded the engine and turbine rooms and caused a transformer explosion. Transformers 1 and 2 were destroyed, while transformers 3, 4, and 5 were left in satisfactory condition. Other damage was also severe as the machinery hall was destroyed, including the roof, ceilings, and floor.

On 9 September 2009, RusHydro announced the damage caused by the incident:

- Turbine 6: Flooded
- Turbine 5: Flooding and electrical damage
- Turbines 3 and 4: Moderate electrical and mechanical damage. Some damage to the concrete structures around them.
- Turbines 1, 8, and 10: Severe electrical and mechanical damage. Some damage to the concrete structures around them.
- Turbines 7 and 9: Completely destroyed, with extreme damage to the concrete structures around them.
- Turbine 2: Destroyed completely, including the concrete structures around it.

=== Power supply ===
Power generation from the station ceased completely following the incident. The resulting blackout in residential areas was alleviated by diverting power from other plants. Aluminium smelters in Sayanogorsk and Khakassia were completely cut off from the grid before power supplies were replaced using alternate power sources. Power to blacked out areas was fully restored by 19 August 2009. Although smelters continue to work at their normal rate, RUSAL warned that in the longer term it may lose up to 500,000 tonnes (490,000 long tons; 550,000 short tons) of aluminum output due to the power shortage, and called for accelerating the construction of the Boguchany hydroelectric power station to replace the lost generating capacity.

=== Environmental impact ===
The accident caused an oil spill, releasing at least 40 tonnes (39 long tons; 44 short tons) of transformer oil which spread over 80 km (50 mi) downstream of Yenisei. The oil, which spilled during the approximately 2–3 hour cutoff of river flow when all the gates of the dam were closed, killed 400 tonnes (390 long tons; 440 short tons) of cultivated trout in two riverside fisheries, with its impact on wildlife as yet unassessed. On 19 August 2009, the 15 km (9.3 mi)-long spill had reached Ust-Abakan, where it was cordoned off with floating barriers and chemical sorbents. The oil spill was fully removed by 25 August 2009.

=== Financial impact ===
==== Share prices ====
Trading in RusHydro shares at the Moscow Interbank Currency Exchange was suspended for two days. After trading resumed on 19 August 2009, the shares dropped 11.4%. On the London Stock Exchange, the share price dropped more than 15%. It is expected that RusHydro's business losses will amount to 16.5 billion roubles (US$523 million) by 2013. The power plant was insured for US$200 million by Russian insurance company ROSNO, part of Allianz group, and re-insured by Munich Re.

==== Compensation ====
The Russian government decided to pay compensation of 1 million rubles (US$31,600) to each victim's family, and 100,000 rubles (about US$3,100) to each survivor, while RusHydro decided to pay a further 1 million rubles in compensation. RusHydro also decided to buy housing for 13 families of killed workers with underage children. There are also programs to support these children in kindergartens and schools and to provide higher education. In addition, a special program is planned for the reconstruction and development of the Cheryomushki settlement, the main settlement where the power plant workers live.

=== Personnel ===
The director of the plant, Nikolai Nevolko, was replaced by Valerii Kjari. Several people were awarded for their heroic actions during the accident. Russian Prime Minister Vladimir Putin, awarded Juri Salnikov and Oleg Melnitchuck each with an Official Letter of Commendation.

== Repairs ==
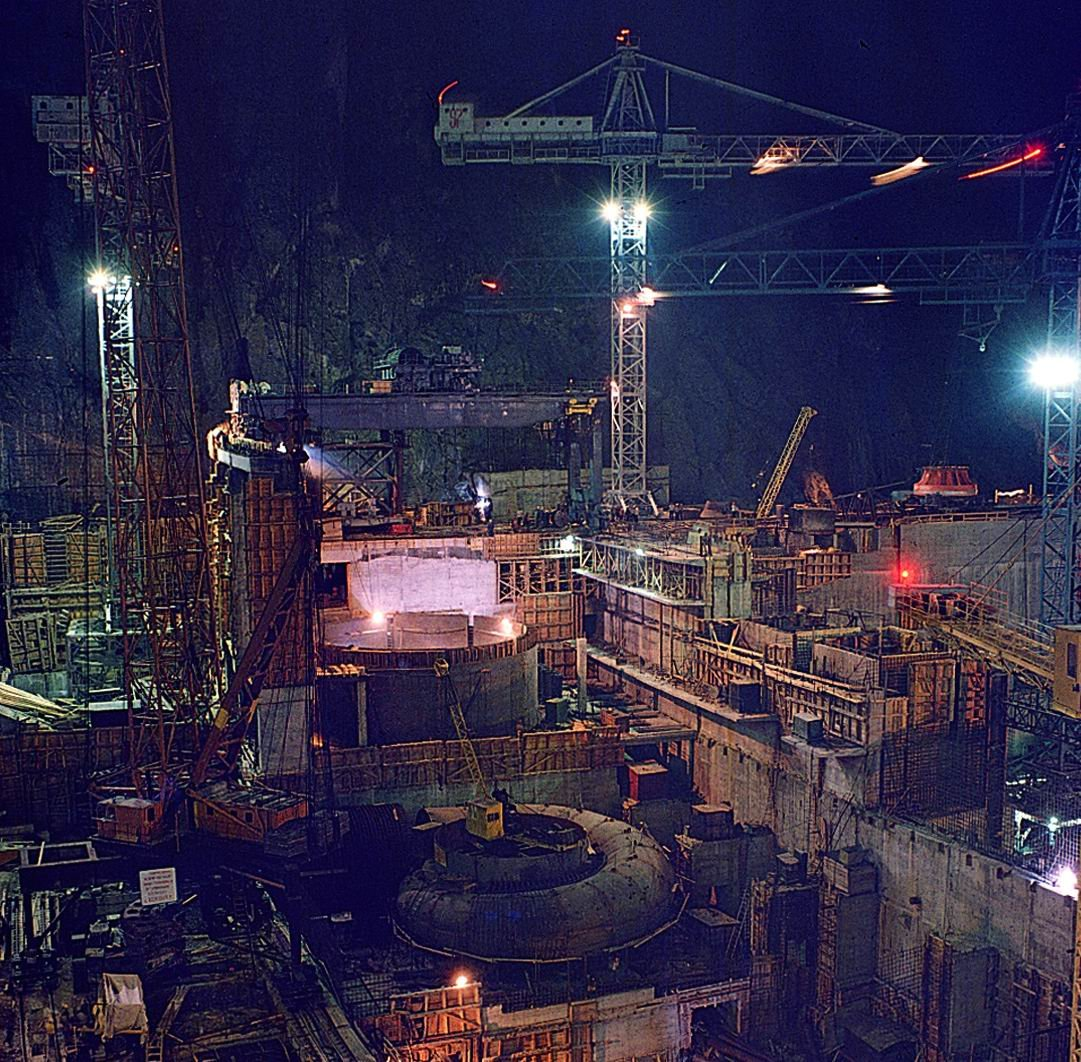
Construction of the station and assembly of turbine 2

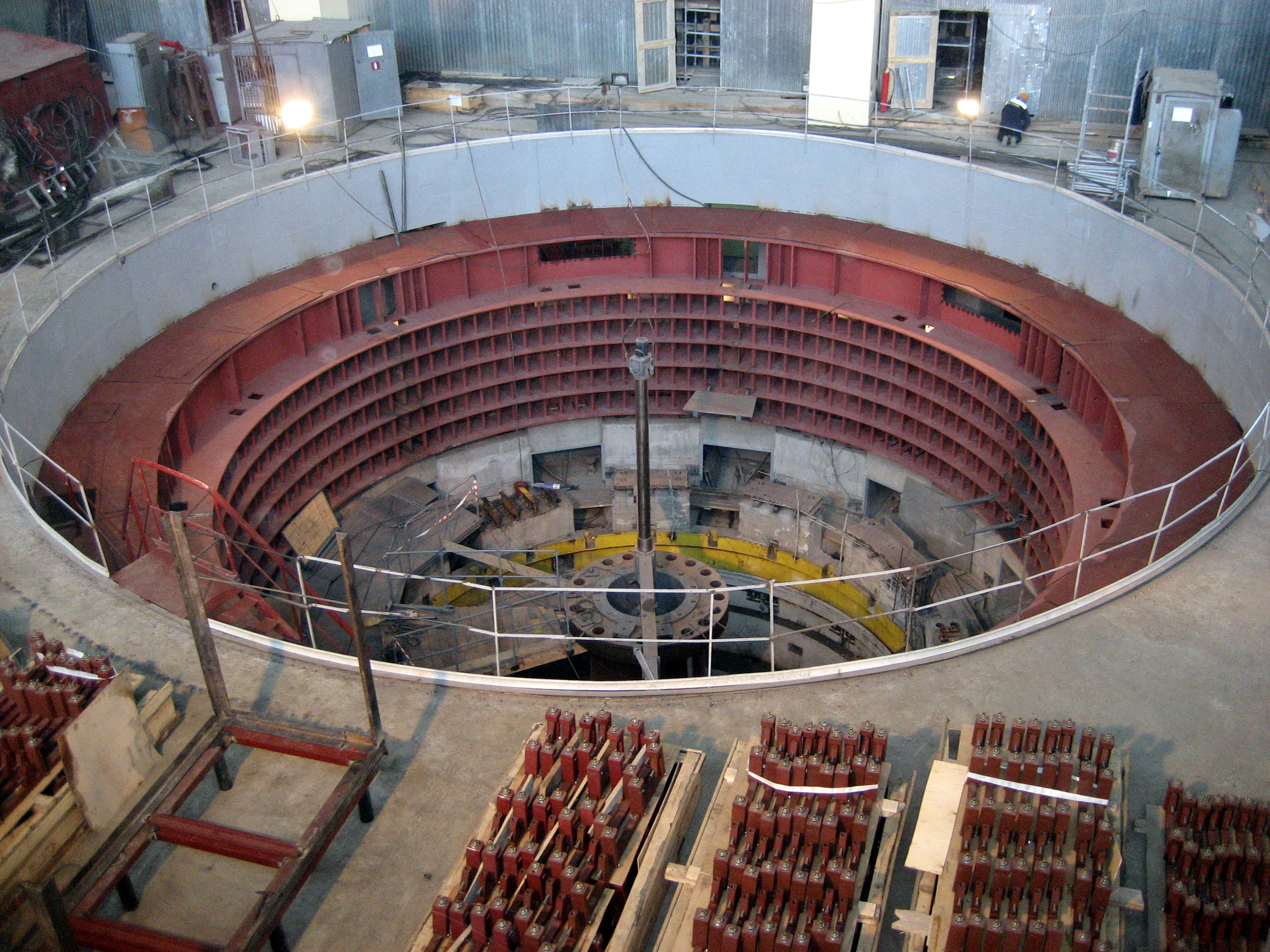
Repairs on a turbine, in 2011

At the time, repairs were estimated to take up to four years. Over 2,000 people were involved in the rescue work and liquidation of the consequences after the disaster. According to Russian Energy Minister Sergei Shmatko, the rebuilding of the engine room alone was estimated to cost 40 billion rubles (€880 million, US$1.3 billion). Russia's Sberbank agreed to lend 20 billion rubles (€440 million, US$630 million) for the repair works. RusHydro also negotiated a loan with the European Bank for Reconstruction and Development.

According to RusHydro, turbines 4, 5, and 6 would probably be repaired. Turbines 7 and 9 were too damaged and were disassembled. The machinery hall, heating system, electricity supply, and sewage tunnels were under repair. As the spillway works all the time, several methods of preventing the dam from icing were also under consideration. The machinery hall and its heating system also underwent repairs. The repair work was performed continuously, 24 hours a day.

During repairs, water was being discharged using the spillway only. Special measures were taken to ensure its safe operation in winter conditions. Water gates were modified to be temporarily locked into an intermediate position for better flow control. Vapor clouds at the base of the spillway were expected to cause unwanted ice buildup on the construction site. A team of climbers equipped with chainsaws and jackhammers was assembled to remove excess ice, and a heating system was installed under the machine hall's roof.

By 27 December 2009, there were on-going or prepared dismantling of turbines 1, 2, 3, 4, 7, 8, 9, and 10. Only turbines 5 and 6 were to be repaired in situ. The other turbines were to be replaced, repaired in the factory and/or modernized.

Turbine 6 was restarted on 24 February 2010. Russian Prime Minister Vladimir Putin personally switched turbine 6 to the load. Turbine 5 was brought under load on 22 March.

On 14 April 2010, the process of dismantling turbine 2 and the infrastructure surrounding it was finished. On 30 June the same year, turbine 4 was started without a load to dry its electrical coils, to test it and to prepare it for switching under load later in 2010. It was fully restarted on 4 August 2010.

By July 2010 the replacement of turbine 3 was underway and expected to be completed in December 2010. The new turbine has better electrical and hydrodynamic characteristics and a 40-year working life.

On 6 July 2011, a ship loaded with new parts for the turbines left Saint Petersburg.

On 8 July 2011, turbines 3, 4 and 5 were working under full load and turbine 6 was in reserve.

On 11 November 2014 the renovations and repairs were fully completed.

== Attack on journalist ==
It was reported that on 9 September 2009, Novy Fokus Mikhail Afanasyev, the editor of a regional news website, was attacked and beaten near his house in Abakan. Earlier, he was charged for "spreading false information and defaming rescuers in his reports" by the local prosecutor's office. Afanasyev believes that the attack is "probably connected to his articles about the accident".

== See also ==
- August curse
- Critical speed
- List of hydroelectric power station failures
