= Irganai Dam =

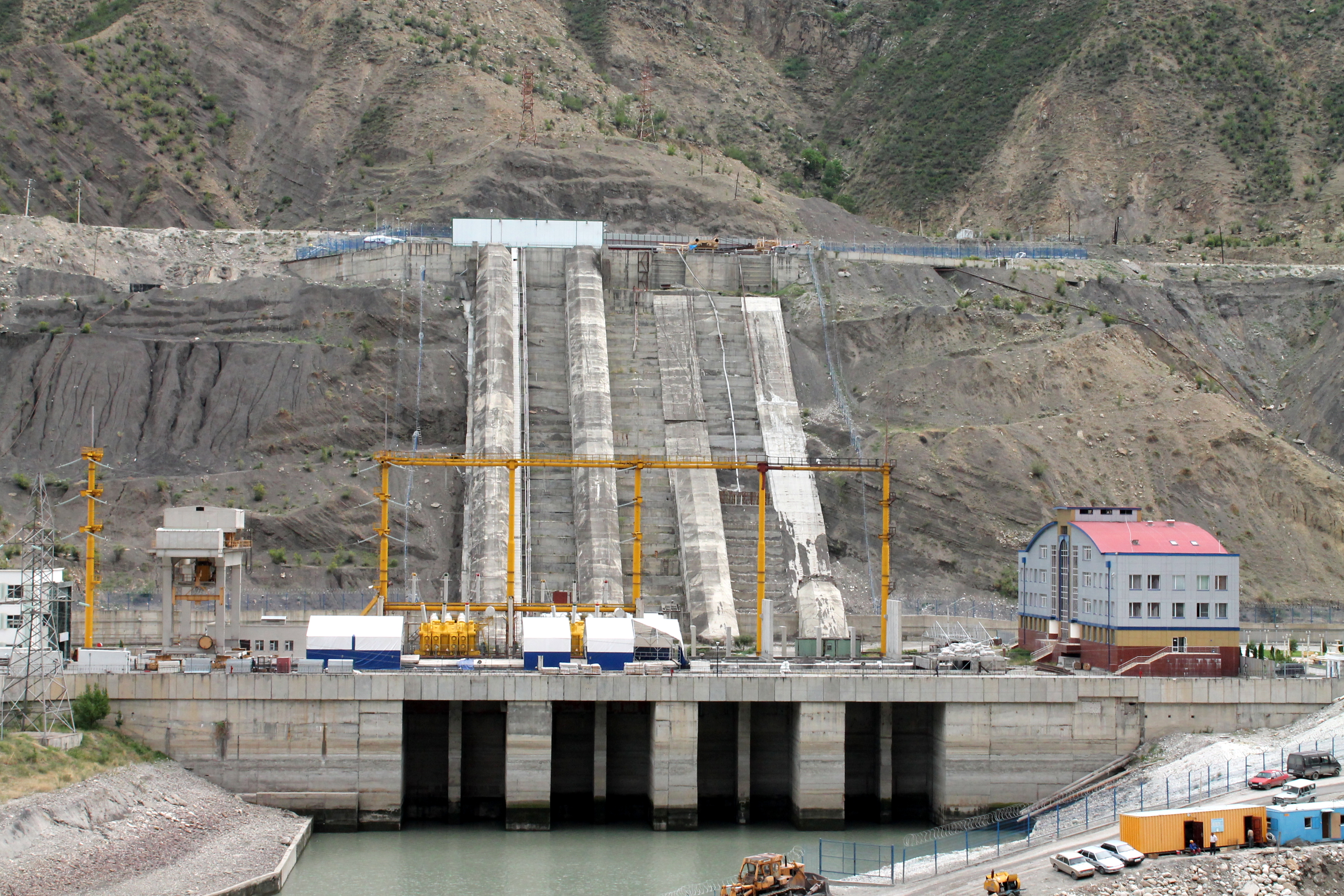

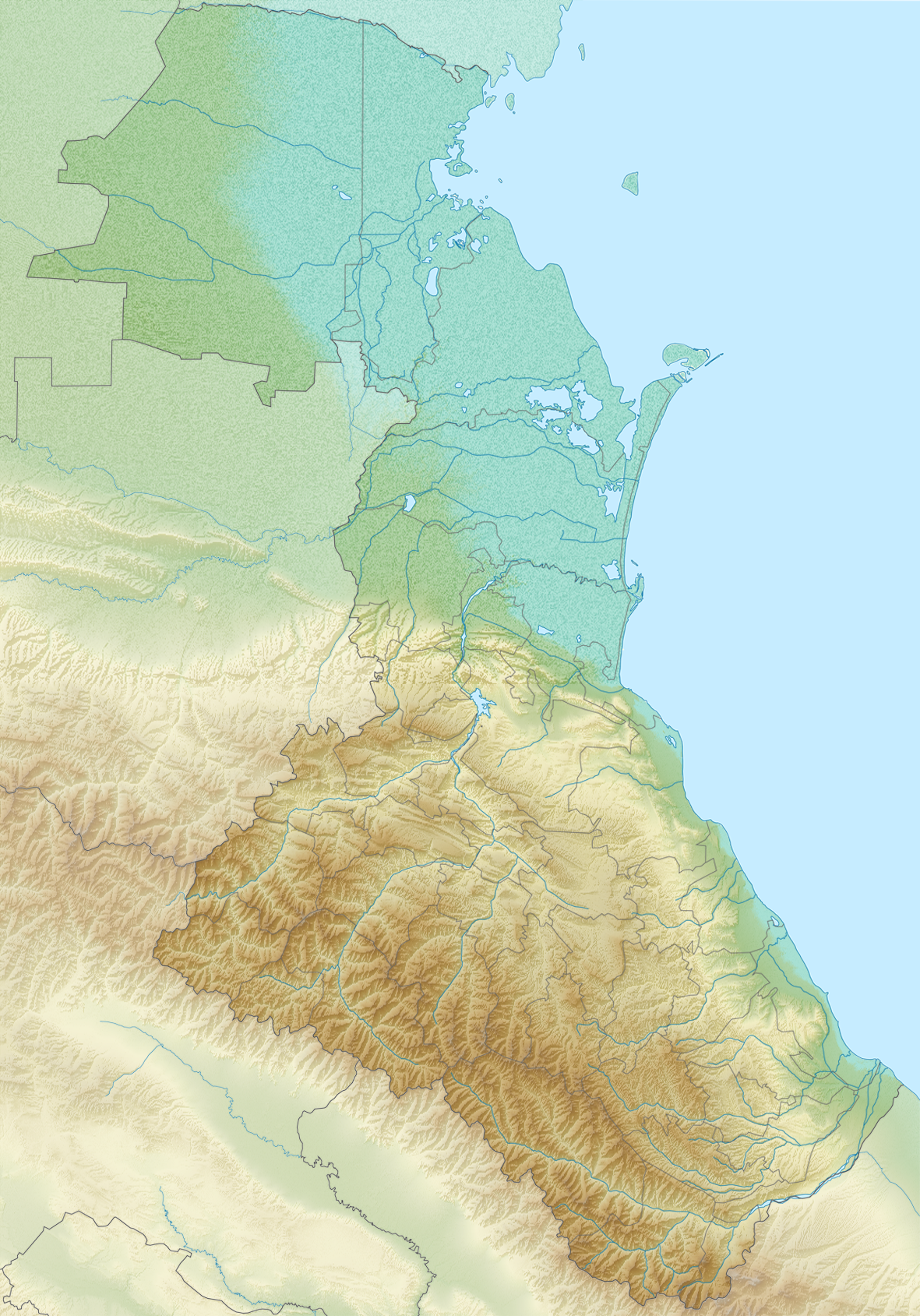
- Location of the Irganai Dam in Dagestan Irganai Dam (Russia)
- Country: Dagestan, Russia
- Location: Untskul region
- Coordinates: 42°44′42.72″N 46°49′53.76″E
- Status: Operational
- Construction began: 1979
- Opening date: 1998
- Owner: RusHydro

Dam and spillways
- Impounds: Avar Koisu
- Height: 111 m (364 ft)
- Length: 317 m (1,040 ft)

Reservoir
- Creates: Irganai reservoir
- Total capacity: 705,000,000 m^{3} (2.49×10^{10} cu ft)
- Surface area: 18 km^{2} (6.9 sq mi)

Power Station
- Turbines: 4 x 200 MW
- Installed capacity: 400 MW; 800 MW (max. planned)
- Annual generation: 1,280 GWh

Irganai Dam is a hydroelectric dam in the Untskul region of Dagestan, Russia. It is located on the river Avar Koisu.

== History ==
Construction of the dam and power station started in 1979. The first generation unit of the Irganai hydropower station was launched in 1998. The second generation unit was launched in 2001.

== Technical description ==
The dam is 111 metres (364 ft) high and 317 metres (1,040 ft) long at the crest. It is filled of gravel with asphalt-concrete diaphragm. The complex includes tunnel spillway, intake structure, two diversion tunnels 5.2 kilometres (3.2 mi) each, underground surge tanks, steel-reinforced concrete penstocks, and a powerhouse.

Irganai is the largest derivational hydroelectric power station in Russia, with two radial-axial hydraulic units with a capacity of 200 MW each. The power station has a total installed capacity of 400 megawatts (MW) and projected capacity of 800 MW. Its mean annual electric energy output is 1,280 GWh.

The dam creates the Irganai reservoir. The reservoir has a surface area of 18 km^{2} (6.9 sq mi). Its full capacity is 705,000,000 cubic metres (2.49×10^{10} cu ft) and alive storage capacity is 397,000,000 cubic metres (1.40×10^{10} cu ft).

The dam and power station is projected by Lenhydroproject and operated by RusHydro.

== Incidents ==
On 7 September 2010, fire broke out at power station's hall. On 9 September 2010, Russian security forces defused an explosive device equivalent to 3 kilograms (6.6 lb) of trinitrotoluene in the room. On 31 January 2011, a stick of dynamite was discovered at the power station.
