= Cheryomushki, Republic of Khakassia =

Cheryomushki Черёмушки
- Work settlement
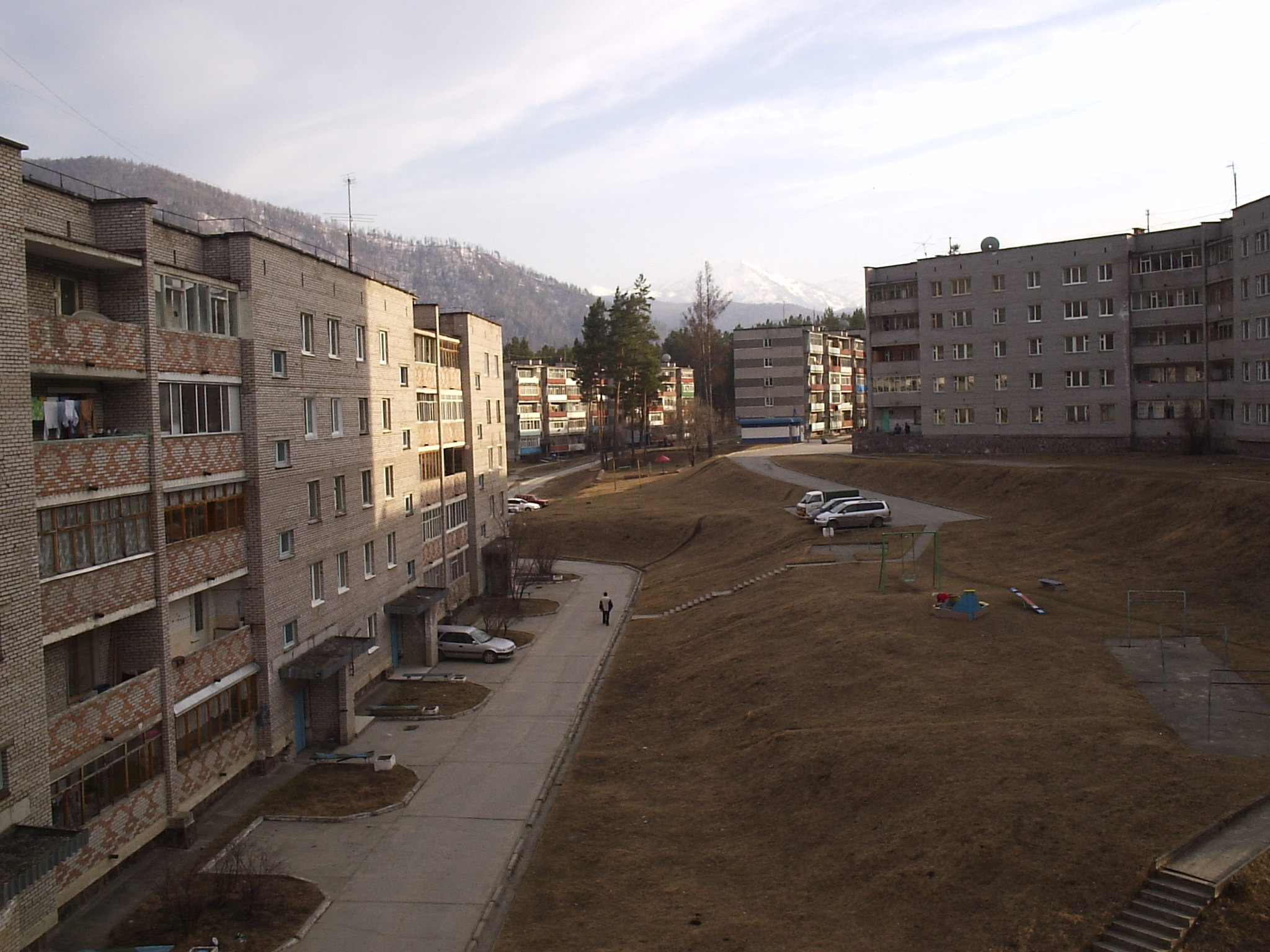
- Interactive map of Cheryomushki
- Location of Cheryomushki Cheryomushki (Khakassia)
- Coordinates: 52°51′44″N 91°25′01″E
- Country: Russia
- Federal subject: Khakassia

Population (2010 Census)
  - Total: 5,062
  - Estimate (2021): 7,382 (+45.8%)

Administrative status
  - Subordinated to: town of republican significance of Sayanogorsk

Municipal status
  - Urban okrug: Sayanogorsky Urban Okrug
- Time zone: UTC+7 (MSK+4)
- Postal code: 655619
- OKTMO ID: 95708000061

Cheryomushki (Russian: Черёмушки) is an urban locality (urban-type settlement) under the administrative jurisdiction of the town of republican significance of Sayanogorsk of the Republic of Khakassia, Russia. Population: 8,373 (2010 census); 9,067 (2002 census); 11,854 (1989 Soviet census).
