= Bureya Dam =

Dam in Russia

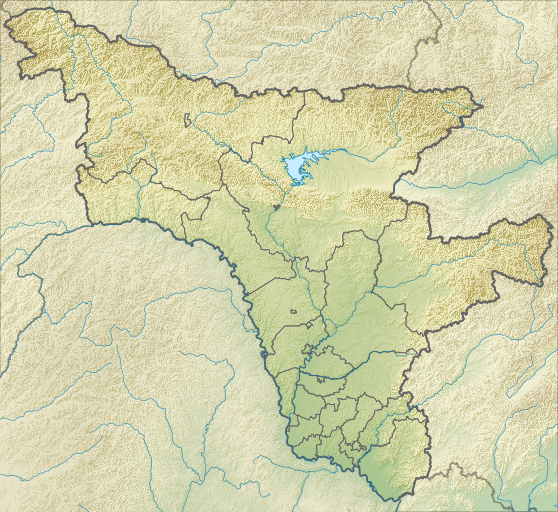
- Location of the dam in Amur Oblast
- Official name: Бурейская ГЭС
- Country: Russia
- Location: Far East
- Coordinates: 50°16′09″N 130°18′48″E
- Purpose: Power
- Status: Operational
- Construction began: 1976
- Opening date: 2009
- Owner: RusHydro

Dam and spillways
- Type of dam: Gravity dam
- Impounds: Bureya River
- Height: 140 m (460 ft)
- Length: 736 m (2,415 ft)

Reservoir
- Total capacity: 20.94 GL (16,980 acre⋅ft)
- Surface area: 750 km^{2} (290 sq mi)

Bureyskaya hydroelectric plant (Russian: Бурейская ГЭС)
- Coordinates: 50°16′12″N 130°18′49″E
- Operator: RusHydro
- Commission date: 2010
- Type: Conventional
- Turbines: 6 × 335 MW (449,000 hp)
- Installed capacity: 2,010 MW (2.70×10^{6} hp)

The Bureya Dam (locally referred to as Bureyskaya, Russian: Бурейская ГЭС) is a hydroelectric dam on the Bureya River in the Russian Far East.

== History ==
Bureya hydroelectric power station was built by Bureyagesstroy. Construction started in 1976, but was halted until 1999. In 1999, RAO UES restarted the project. The dam was completed and the first unit was launched in 2003. The construction of the whole complex was completed in 2009.

The reservoir reached its specified level during the summer-autumn monsoon season of 2009. It was accompanied with first use of spillways during planned tests. Despite the fact that all primary construction works on power station was completed, it was officially commenced for exploitation by government commission in 2011. Therefore, officially, the complex is still under construction.

== Description ==
The Bureya Dam is a gravity dam with height of 140 metres (460 ft) and crest length of 736 metres (2,415 ft).

Owned by RusHydro, the Bureyskaya conventional hydroelectric plant has an installed capacity of 2,010 megawatts (2.70×10^{6} hp). Power is generated by utilizing six turbines, each with a capacity of 335 MW (449,000 hp).

== Gallery ==
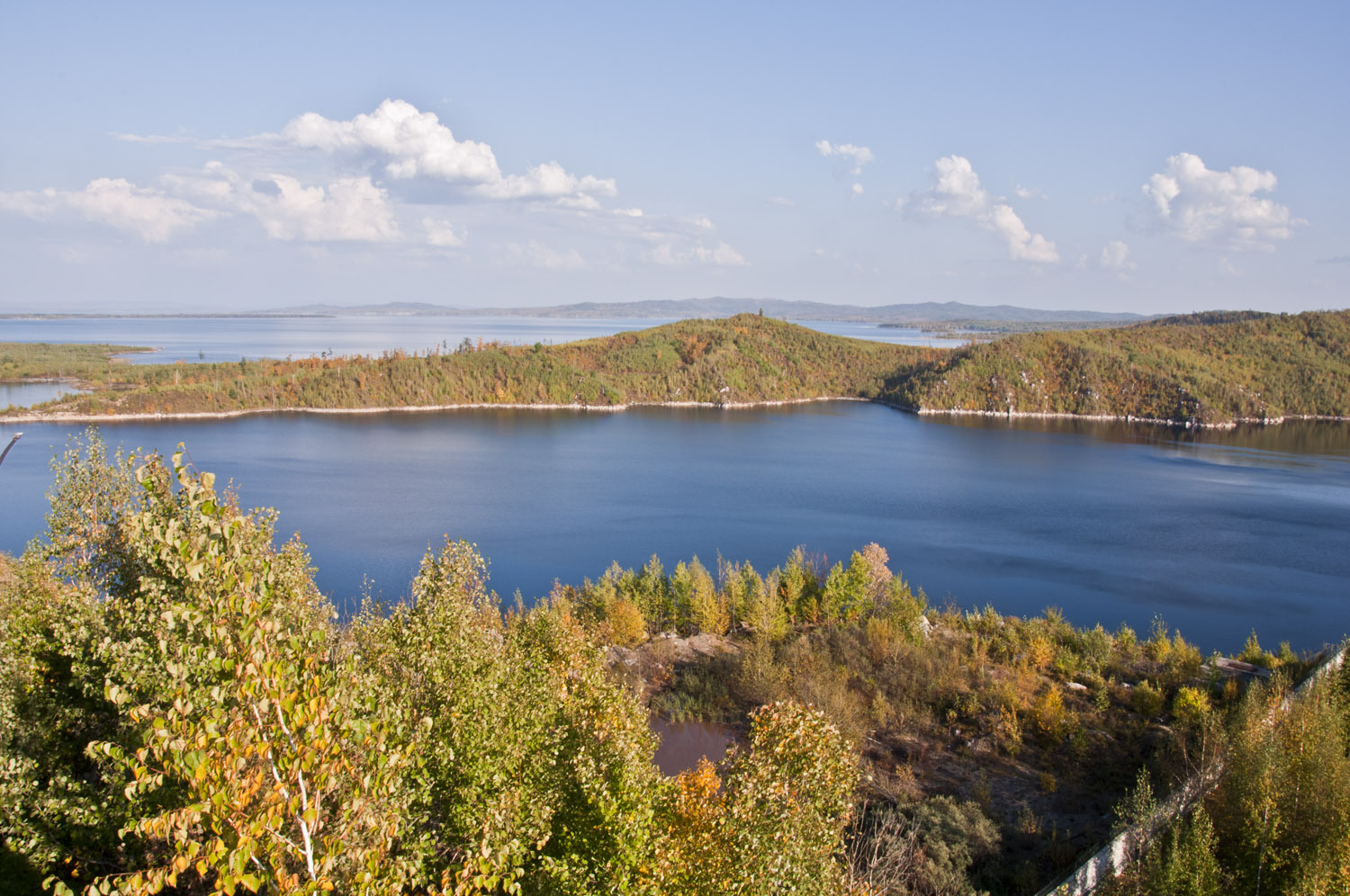
Bureya Reservoir

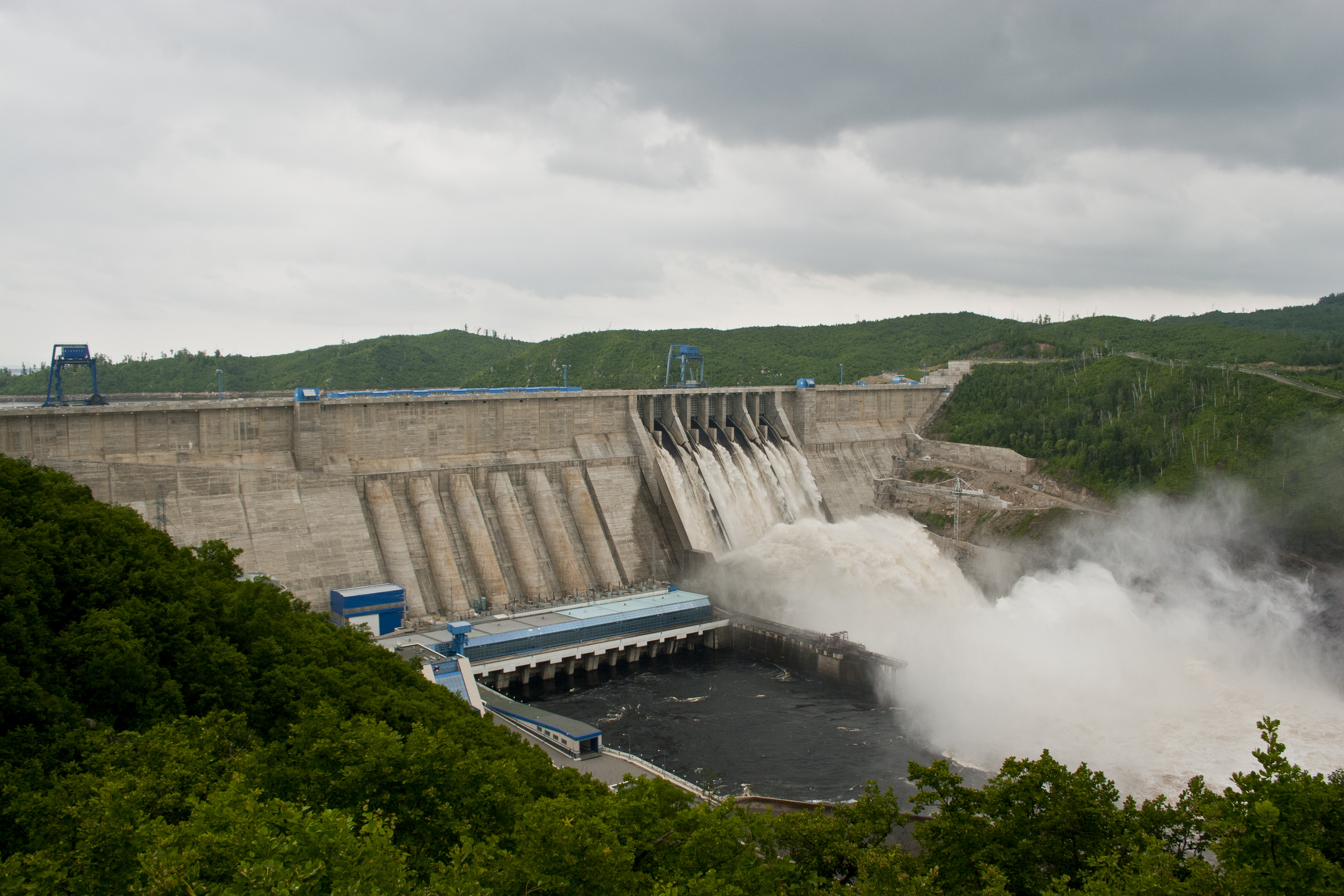
Spillways of Bureya HPP in work

== See also ==
- List of conventional hydroelectric power stations
- List of power stations in Russia
