= Sergei Shmatko =

Russian businessman and politician (1966–2021)

- Сергей Шматко
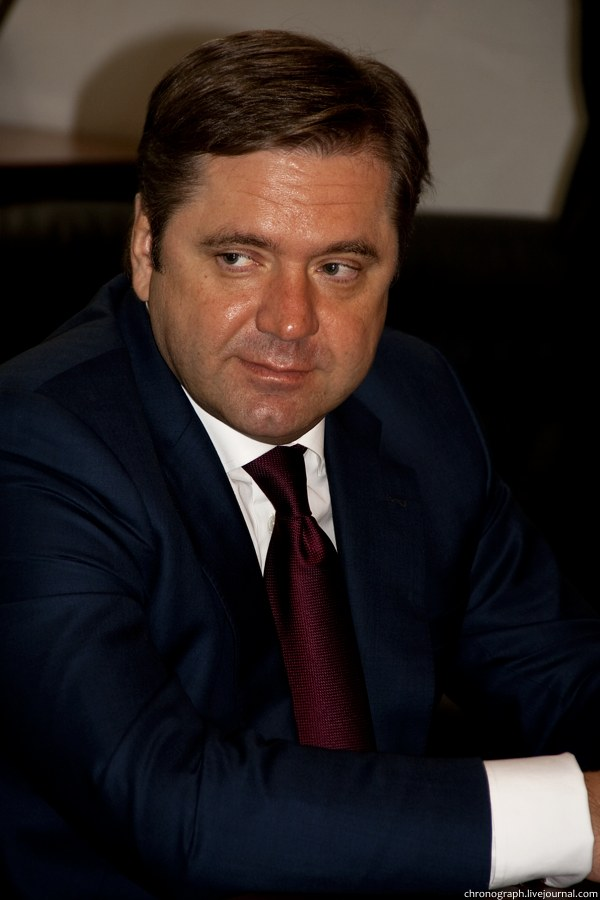
- Shmatko in 2011

Minister of Energy
- In office May 2008 – May 2012
- Prime Minister: Vladimir Putin
- Succeeded by: Alexander Novak

Personal details
- Born: 26 September 1966 Stavropol, Russian SFSR, Soviet Union (now Russia)
- Died: 7 November 2021 (aged 55) Moscow, Russia
- Party: United Russia

Sergei Ivanovich Shmatko (Russian: Сергей Иванович Шматко, 26 September 1966 – 7 November 2021) was a Russian businessman and politician specializing in the energy industry.

He was Russia's Minister of Energy from May 2008 until May 2012.

== Early life and education ==
Shmatko was born in Stavropol (South-West of Russia). He earned degrees from both Urals State University in Yekaterinburg (USSR) and the University of Marburg in West Germany.

== Business career ==
Shmatko's business career from 1992 involved stints consulting in Germany and Russia, and working at the All-Russia Bank of Regional Development. He was appointed head of economic strategy at Rosenergoatom in 1997 and in 2005 became president of Russia's nuclear-power export monopoly, Atomstroyexport.

== Minister of Energy ==
Shmatko was appointed to the newly established position of Minister of Energy in May 2008, during the incoming administration of President Dmitry Medvedev.

== Death ==
He died from COVID-19 on 7 November 2021, during the COVID-19 pandemic in Russia.
