= Energy policy of Russia =

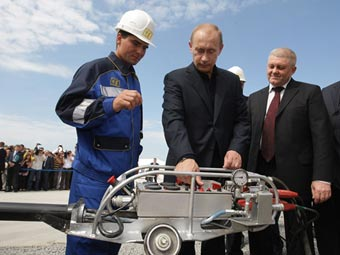
Putin at the ceremony of opening the gas pipeline in Khabarovsk

Russia's energy policy is presented in the government's Energy Strategy document, first approved in 2000, which sets out the government's policy to 2020 (later extended to 2030). The Energy Strategy outlines several key priorities: increased energy efficiency, reducing the impact on the environment, sustainable development, energy development and technological development, as well as improved effectiveness and competitiveness. Russia's greenhouse gas emissions are large because of its energy policy. Russia is rich in natural energy resources and is one of the world's energy superpowers. Russia is the world's leading net energy exporter, and was a major supplier to the European Union until the Russian invasion of Ukraine. Russia has signed and ratified the Kyoto Protocol and Paris Agreement. Numerous scholars posit that Russia uses its energy exports as a foreign policy instrument towards other countries.

In July 2008, Russia's president signed a law allowing the government to allocate strategic oil and gas deposits on the continental shelf without an auction procedure. On 17 February 2011, Russia signed a deal with China, stating that in return for $25 billion in Chinese loans to Russian oil companies, Russia would supply China with large quantities of crude oil via new pipelines for the next 20 years.

As of 2014, oil and gas comprise over 60% of Russia's exports and account for over 30% of the country's gross domestic product (GDP). Russian energy policy of pumping 10.6 million barrels of oil a day is nearly 4 billion barrels annually.

Russia holds 54% of world reserves of gas, 46% of coal, 14% of uranium, and 13% of oil. Russian oil production and export increased significantly after 2000, and in 2006 briefly exceeded Saudi Arabia's production. Since 2016, Russia has been the top crude oil producer. Russia is also the world's largest energy exporter and fossil fuel exporter. Russia is not a member of OPEC (Organization of Petroleum Exporting Countries) and presents itself as an alternative to Middle Eastern energy resources, asserting that it is in fact a "reliable energy supplier and that it only seeks to use its position as an important supplier to enhance global energy security". However, in recent years it has cooperated increasingly closely with OPEC in the OPEC+ format.

The Russian economy is heavily dependent on the export of natural resources such as oil and natural gas, and Russia has used these resources to its political advantage. Meanwhile, the US and other Western countries have worked to lessen the dependency of Europe on Russia and its resources. Starting in the mid-2000s, Russia and Ukraine had several disputes in which Russia threatened to cut off the supply of gas. As a great deal of Russia's gas is exported to Europe through the pipelines crossing Ukraine, those disputes affected several other European countries as well. Under Putin, special efforts were made to gain control over the European energy sector. Russian influence played a major role in canceling the construction of the Nabucco pipeline, which would have supplied natural gas from Azerbaijan, in favor of South Stream (though South Stream was also cancelled). Russia has also sought to create a Eurasian Economic Union consisting of itself and other post-Soviet countries.

== Energy strategy ==
The economy of the Union of Soviet Socialist Republics was based on a system of state ownership of the means of production, collective farming, industrial manufacturing and centralized administrative planning. The economy was characterized by state control of investment, and public ownership of industrial assets. The Soviet Union invested heavily into infrastructure projects including the electrification of vast areas, and the construction and maintenance of natural gas and oil pipelines that stretch out of Russia and into every constituent nations of the USSR. This type of investment set the stage for Russia to become an energy superpower.

The concept of a Russian national energy policy was approved by the Russian government in 1992, and the government decided to develop the Energy Strategy. For this purpose the Interagency Commission was established.

In December 1994, the Energy Strategy of Russia (Major Provisions) was approved by the government, followed by the presidential decree of 7 May 1995 that outlined the first post-Soviet Russian energy strategy On the Main Directions of Energy Policy and Restructuring of the Fuel and Energy Industry of the Russian Federation for the Period up to the Year 2010, and the government's decision of 13 October 1995 that approved the Main provisions for the Energy Strategy of the Russian Federation.

The strategy was amended under the presidency of Vladimir Putin. On 23 November 2000, the government approved the main provisions of the Russian energy strategy to 2020. On 28 May 2002, the Russian Ministry of Energy gave an elaboration on the main provisions. Based on these documents, the new Russian energy strategy up to 2020 was approved on 23 May 2003 and confirmed by the government on 28 August 2003. The main objective of the energy strategy was defined as reaching a better quality of fuel and energy mix and enhancing the competitiveness of Russian energy production and services in the world market. To that end, the long-term energy policy was to concentrate on energy safety, energy effectiveness, budget effectiveness and ecological energy security.

The Energy Strategy defines the main priority of Russian energy strategy as an increase in energy efficiency (meaning decreasing of energy intensity in production and energy supply expenditures), reducing impact on the environment, sustainable development, energy development and technological development, as well as an improvement of effectiveness and competitiveness.

== Natural gas ==
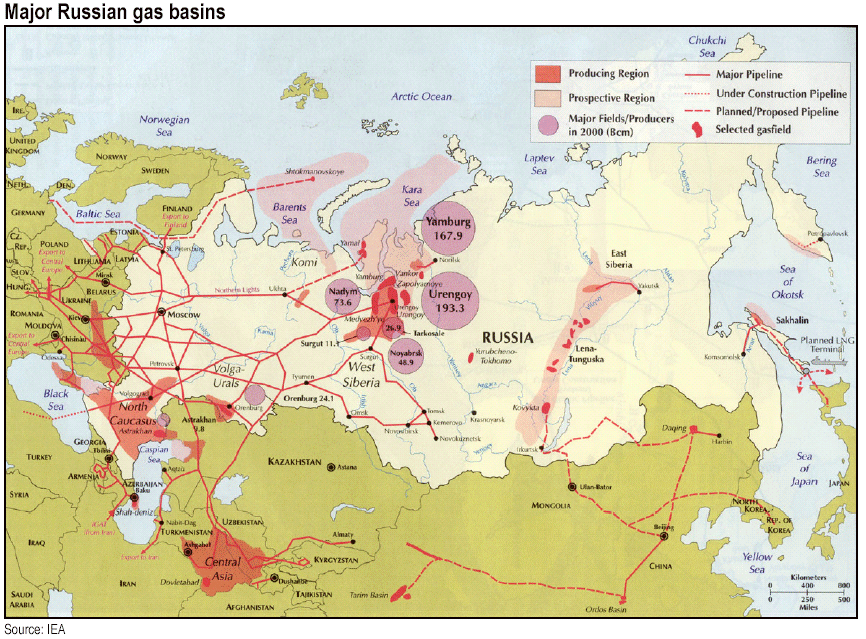
Major Russian natural gas basins

The main natural gas producers in Russia are gas companies Gazprom, Novatek, Itera, Northgas and Rospan, and vertically integrated oil and gas companies Surgutneftegaz, TNK-BP, Rosneft and LUKOIL.

Majority state-owned Gazprom has a monopoly of natural gas pipelines and has the exclusive right to export natural gas, granted by the Federal Law "On Gas Export", which came into force on 20 July 2006. Gazprom also has control over all gas pipelines out of Central Asia, and thus controls access to the European market. Russia has used Central Asia's gas, primarily that from Turkmenistan, on occasions where it has found itself unable to meet all its delivery obligations from its own production. For example, in 2000 Gazprom allowing Turkmenistan to use its pipelines to supply gas to the Russian domestic market, to enable Gazprom to fulfil its obligations to European customers.

Historically, the Medvezhye, Urengoy and Yamburg gas fields have made up the bulk of Gazprom's production. However, in the coming 10–20 years an increasing share of Gazprom's production will have to come from new fields. Recent developments such as Yen-Yakhinskoe, Yuzhno-Russkoye and West Pestsovoe in the Nadym-Pur-Taz area, which have all come on-stream since 2005, are relatively cost-efficient, being located close to the existing pipeline grid and other infrastructure. But they are not large enough to compensate for the decline in Gazprom's three core assets. Thus, the much larger Shtokman and Yamal developments will have to provide the bulk of new production capacity, by adding 70 and 200 BCM per year, respectively. Investments in the development of Shtokman and Yamal are forecast to account for over 40% of Gazprom's total expected capital expenditure over the next 20 years. Although Shtokman has been shelved at least for the time being due to relatively low gas prices and high costs, the project may still be resuscitated during the coming decades, depending on developments in unconventional gas and the supply–demand picture. Meanwhile, work on the largest field on the Yamal Peninsula, Bovanenkovo, is forging ahead. In any case, the complexity of these projects drives high field development costs, which in turn require a high gas price to be profitable.

The Energy Strategy foresees non-Gazprom production rising from a share of 17% in 2008 to 25–30% by 2030, implying growth from 114 to about 245 BCM/year.

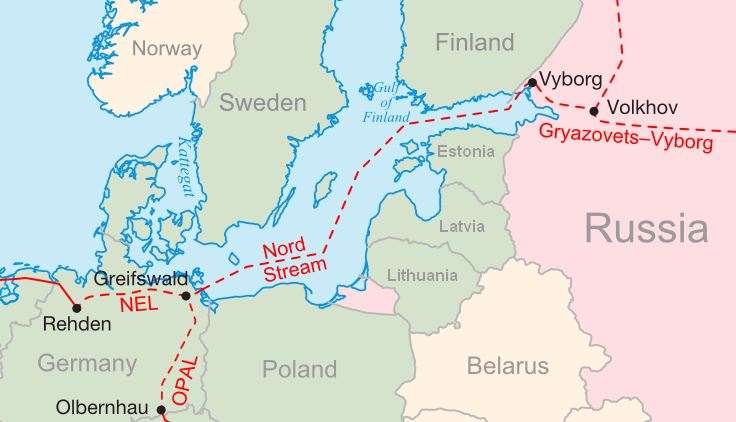
Nord Stream 1 gas pipeline, running under the Baltic Sea. In 2018, Germany imported 50% to 75% of its natural gas from Russia.

Before 2022, the main export markets of Russian natural gas were the European Union and the CIS. Russia supplied a quarter of the EU gas consumption, mainly via transit through Ukraine (Soyuz, Urengoy–Pomary–Uzhhorod pipeline) and Belarus (Yamal-Europe pipeline). The main importers are Germany (where links were developed as a result of Germany's Ostpolitik during the 1970s, and also Ukraine, Belarus, Italy, Turkey, France and Hungary.

In September 2009, Prime Minister Vladimir Putin said Russia would try to liberalize the domestic gas market in the near future but would maintain Gazprom's export monopoly in the medium term.

In 2014, Russia and China signed a 30-year gas deal worth $400 billion. Deliveries to China started in late 2019. The Power of Siberia pipeline is designed to reduce China's dependence on coal, which is more carbon intensive and causes more pollution than natural gas. For Russia, the pipeline allows another economic partnership in the face of resistance to pipelines being built in Western Europe. The proposed western gas route from Russia's West Siberian petroleum basin to North-Western China is known as Power of Siberia 2 (Altai gas pipeline).

In 2022, Turkish President Recep Tayyip Erdoğan and Russian President Vladimir Putin planned for Turkey to become an energy hub for all of Europe. According to Aura Săbăduș, a senior energy journalist focusing on the Black Sea region, "Turkey would accumulate gas from various producers — Russia, Iran and Azerbaijan, [liquefied natural gas] and its own Black Sea gas — and then whitewash it and relabel it as Turkish. European buyers wouldn't know the origin of the gas."

== Oil ==
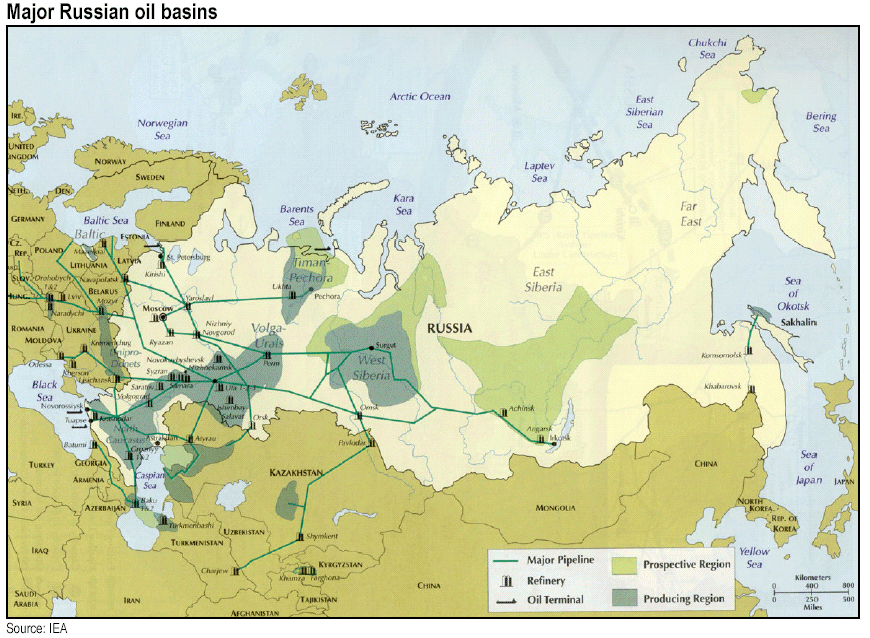
Major Russian oil basins circa 2000

Energy was the backbone of the Soviet economy. The 1973 oil embargo marked a turning point in Soviet society. The increase in the price of oil around the world prompted the USSR to begin exporting oil in exchange for money and Western technology. Increasing Western reliance on Russian resources further bolstered the importance of Russia's energy sector to the overall economy.

As the Arctic ice cap shrinks due to global warming, the prospect of oil exploration in the Arctic Ocean is thought to be an increasing possibility. On 20 December 2001, Russia submitted documents to the UN Commission on the Limits of the Continental Shelf claiming expanded limits to Russian continental shelf beyond the previous 200-mile zone within the Russian Arctic sector. In 2002 the UN Commission recommended that Russia should carry out additional research, which commenced in 2007. It is thought that the area may contain 10bn tonnes of gas and oil deposits.

== Coal ==
Russia is the world's largest fossil fuel exporter and third-largest coal exporter. The coal sector is the backbone of several regional economies and local communities in Russia. In 2021, Russia held 15 % of the world's proven reserves of coal, 5 % of global coal production and 18 % of global coal exports.

== Electricity ==
The Russian electricity market is dominated by Inter RAO and Gazprom Energoholding, the power generation subsidiary of Gazprom. While production and retail sale is open to competition, transmission and distribution remains under state control.

In recent years there have been several blackouts, notably the 2005 Moscow power blackouts.

== Climate change ==
Vladimir Putin approved the Kyoto Protocol on 4 November 2004 and Russia officially notified the United Nations of its ratification on 18 November 2004. The issue of Russian ratification was particularly closely watched in the international community, as the accord was brought into force 90 days after Russian ratification (16 February 2005).

President Putin had earlier decided in favour of the protocol in September 2004, along with the Russian cabinet, against the opinion of the Russian Academy of Sciences, of the Ministry for Industry and Energy and of the then president's economic advisor, Andrey Illarionov, and in exchange to EU's support for the Russia's admission in the WTO. As anticipated after this, ratification by the lower (22 October 2004) and upper house of parliament did not encounter any obstacles.

The Kyoto Protocol limits emissions to a percentage increase or decrease from their 1990 levels. Russia did not face mandatory cuts since its greenhouse-gas emissions fell well below the 1990 baseline due to a drop in economic output after the breakup of the Soviet Union. Because of this, despite its growing economy, by 2012 Russia will by no means exceed the level of emissions in 1990, which is the Kyoto Protocol's year of departure.

== Renewable energy ==
Renewable energy in Russia is relatively underdeveloped due to the lack of a conducive government policy framework and lack of clear policy signals. The abundance of energy and subsidies for natural gas, electricity and heating have also hampered growth of renewable energy in the country.

== Russia and OPEC ==
The Organization of the Petroleum Exporting Countries has unsuccessfully asked Russia to become a member several times. In 2008, with falling oil prices, Russia announced that it would work with OPEC to coordinate a reduction in output.

In 2013, Saudi Arabia was reported to have urged Russia to join OPEC, but Russia declined the offer. Russia has expressed its desire to become an observer to OPEC, which could lead to greater communication that Russia has sought since the oil price crash in 2014. In 2015, it was estimated that Russia working with OPEC would boost the cartel's clout by nearly a third.

Russia and OPEC have made several oil production cutback agreements to raise the price of oil since March 1999, when a deal was reached as part of an agreement between OPEC and non-OPEC oil producers to lift crude prices off their lows.

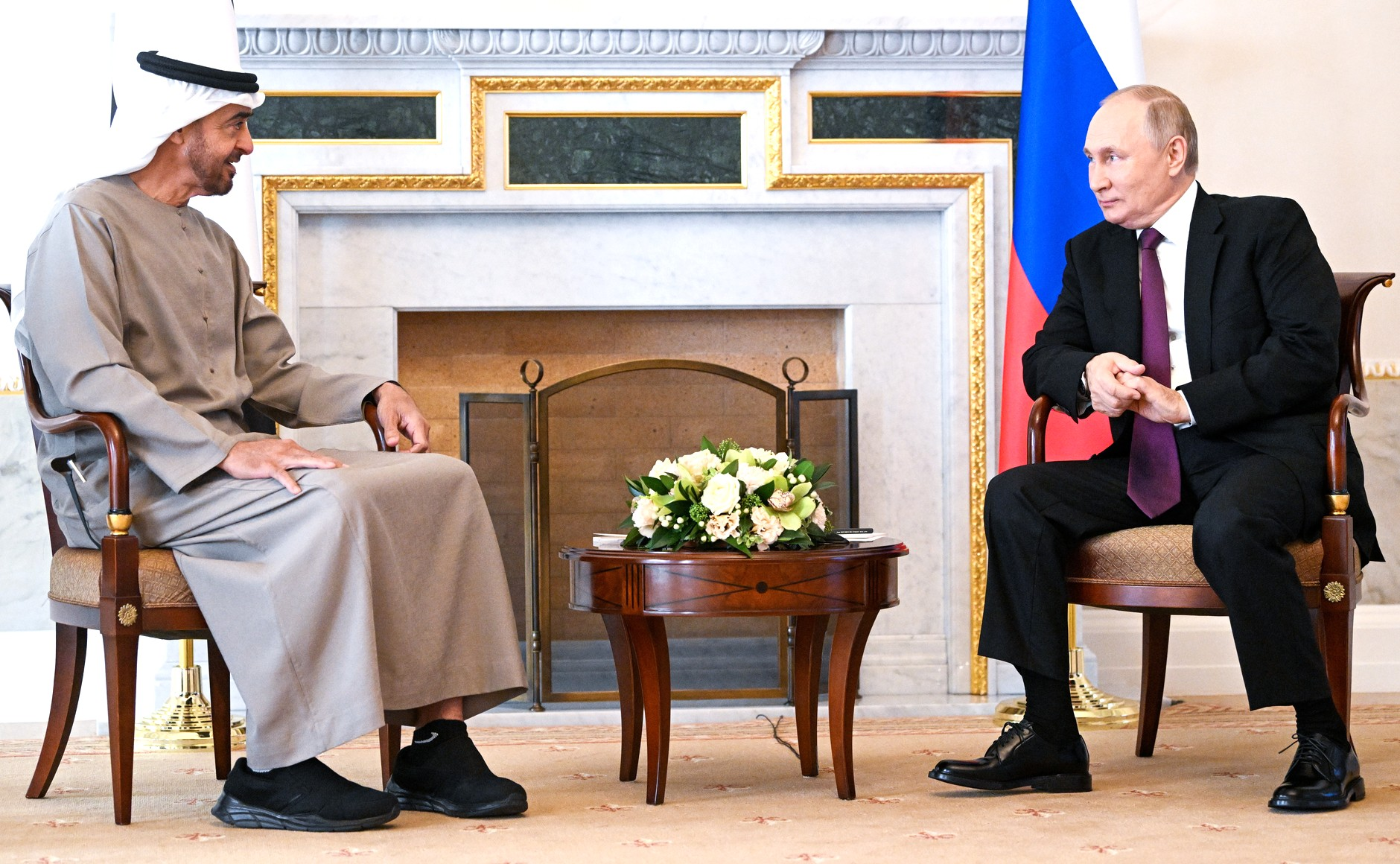
UAE's President Mohamed bin Zayed Al Nahyan with Russian president Vladimir Putin, days after OPEC+ cut oil production, 11 October 2022

In June 2015, Russian president Vladimir Putin received deputy crown prince Mohammad bin Salman along with the Saudi minister of petroleum and mineral resources Ali al-Naimi; the latter spoke of "creating a petroleum alliance between the two countries for the benefit of the international oil market as well as producing countries and stabilizing and improving the market". In late November 2016, Russia agreed to join OPEC nations to reduce oil output, with cuts taking effect from 1 January 2017 to last for six months.

In October 2022, OPEC+ led by Saudi Arabia announced a large cut to its oil output target, which critics say helped Russia. Robert Menendez, the Democratic chairman of the U.S. Senate Foreign Relations Committee, called for a freeze on cooperation with and arms sales to Saudi Arabia, accusing the kingdom of helping Russia underwrite its war with Ukraine.

== Energy usage ==
In terms of the Russian energy demand structure, domestic production greatly exceeds domestic demand, making Russia the world's leading net energy exporter. The Federal Tariff Service sets gas and wholesale electricity prices, the Regional Energy Commissions set co-generated electricity and heating prices, and municipalities set prices for heat transmission and heat generation by municipal boilers. Heavily subsidised district heating—the distribution of heat from a central locale to subsidiary commercial or residential areas—plays a major role, providing over a third of energy requirements for industry and close to half those of the commercial and household sectors. Almost 50 percent of primary energy consumption in Russia is used for heat generation, transmission and distribution. Domestic gas prices generally are barely 15–20 percent of the market rate at which Russia's gas is sold to Germany.

== Energy in foreign policy ==
Countries by natural gas proven reserves (2014), based on data from The World Factbook. Russia has the world's largest reserves.

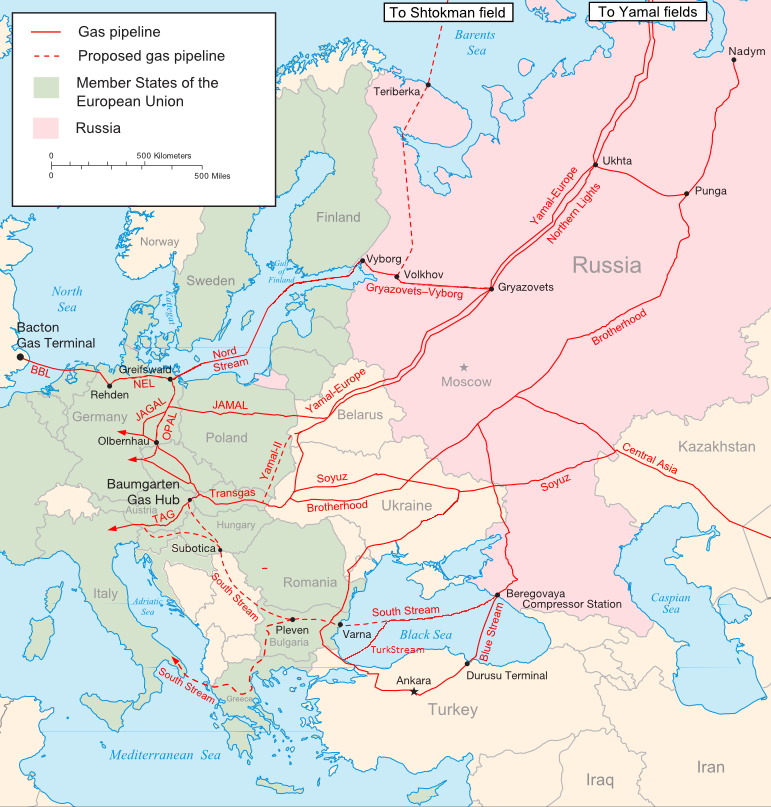
Major existing and planned natural gas pipelines supplying Russian gas to Europe.

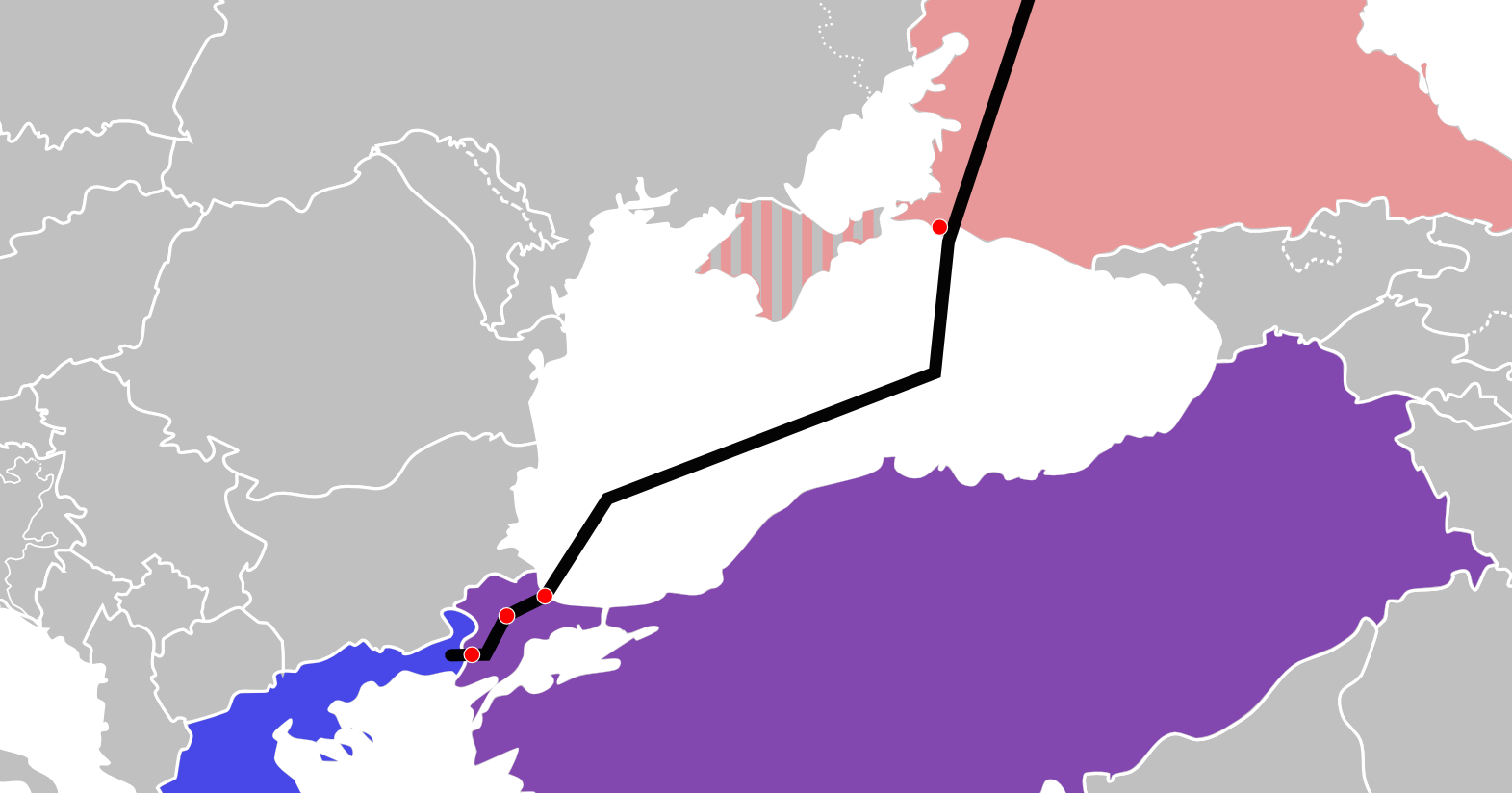
The TurkStream (pictured) and Blue Stream pipelines connect Russia and Turkey under the Black Sea.

Russia's energy superpower status became a hot topic in the European Union in 2006. Russia's large reserves of natural gas have helped give it the title without much debate.

Russia has identified natural gas as a key strategic asset, and since 20 July 2006 Gazprom has had the exclusive right to export natural gas. The Russian government is the largest shareholder of Gazprom, and has been accused of manipulating prices for political reasons, particularly in CIS nations.

After Russia's annexation of Crimea and involvement in the War in Eastern Ukraine in 2014, Western countries imposed sanctions targeting the Russian oil and gas sector. The sanctions did not cause the Russian economy to collapse, but due to the long time-lag on the development of new oil and gas fields, could have a longer-term impact on Russian oil production. However, increased trade with China and investment from China in the Russian economy helped Russia get through this period.

The 2022 Russian invasion of Ukraine resulted in sanctions imposed by the US, the EU and other nations, to forbid or reduce the importation of natural gas, oil and associated products from Russia, including the introduction of a novel price cap on shipped oil, designed to allow Russia to maintain production but limiting the revenue from oil sales.

On 18 May 2022, the European Union published plans to end its reliance on Russian oil, natural gas and coal by 2027.

In January 2024, Ukrainian retaliatory drone strikes hit at least four oil and gas terminals across Russia. Ukrainian journalist Illia Ponomarenko said that "Russia finances its military from oil exports. You can't persuade countries like India and China to stop buying it. So you knock out Russian oil refineries."

=== Energy disputes ===
Russia has been accused in the West (i.e. Europe and the United States) of using its natural resources as a policy tool to be wielded against offending states like Georgia, Ukraine, and other states it perceives as hindrances to its power. According to one estimate, since 1991 there have been more than 55 energy incidents, of which more than 30 had political underpinnings. Only 11 incidents had no political connections. On the other hand, Russian officials like to remind their Western partners that even at the height of the Cold War the Soviet Union never disrupted energy supplies to the West. And yet, Russia's ability to use energy as a foreign policy tool is constrained by many factors.

Russia, in turn, accuses the West of applying double standards relating to market principles, pointing out that it has been supplying gas to the states in question at prices that were significantly below world market levels, and in some cases remain so even after price hikes. Russia argues that it is not obligated to effectively subsidize the economies of post-Soviet states by supplying them with resources at below-market prices.

There is still a risk of supply interruptions for the states of the Former Soviet Union. Depending on bilateral relations and the present context, the risk for partial and/or short-duration cut-offs is high. Since 1991, the energy lever has been used for putting political or economic pressure on Estonia, Latvia, Lithuania, Ukraine, Belarus, Moldova, Georgia that subsequently affected most of Europe. The number of incidents, i.e. cut-offs, take-overs, coercive price policy, blackmail or threats, is over fifty in total (of which about forty are cut-offs). Incidents appear to be equally divided between the Yeltsin and Putin eras, but the number of cut-offs has decreased by half during Putin. The immediate reasons for Russia's coercive policy appear to be political concession in ongoing negotiations, infrastructure take-over, and execution of economically favorable deals or to make political statements. There are economic underpinnings in the majority of the cases and Russian demands for payments of debts are legitimate. However, there are also political underpinnings in more than half of the incidents, and in a few cases explicit political demands are evident.

==== Azerbaijan and Armenia ====
Starting 1 January 2007 Gazprom increased the price of natural gas to Azerbaijan from US$110 to $235 per thousand cubic metres. (At the time, Gazprom charged the EU US$250.) Azerbaijan refused to pay this price and the gas supply to Azerbaijan stopped. On its side, Azerbaijan stopped oil exports to and via Russia.

A year earlier, pro-Russian Armenia was hit with the same 100% price increase as Western-oriented Georgia, Vladimir Socor has observed.

==== Belarus ====
The Russia-Belarus energy dispute began when Russian state-owned gas supplier Gazprom demanded an increase in gas prices paid by Belarus, which has been closely allied with Moscow and forms a loose union state with Russia. It escalated on 8 January 2007, when the Russian state-owned pipeline company Transneft stopped pumping oil into the Druzhba pipeline which runs through Belarus. Transneft has accused Belarus of forcing the shutdown by stealing oil from the pipeline and halted the oil transport. On 10 January, Transneft resumed oil exports through the pipeline after Belarus ended the tariff that sparked the shutdown, despite differing messages from the parties on the state of negotiations.

==== Czech Republic ====
On 9 July 2008, after signing an agreement between the United States and the Czech Republic to host a tracking radar for an antiballistic missile system, the flow of Russian oil through the Druzhba pipeline to the Czech Republic started to reduce. Although officially the linkage between reduction of oil supplies and the radar agreement was not claimed, it was suspected. Transneft denied any connections with radar agreement, saying that reduction was purely commercial as Tatneft and Bashneft started to refine more oil at their own refineries. Although Prime Minister Putin asked Deputy Prime Minister Igor Sechin to 'work with all partners to make sure there are no disruptions', in reality the supplies were reduced to 50%.

==== Georgia ====
In the January 2006 alleged North Ossetia sabotage, two simultaneous explosions occurred on the main branch and a reserve branch of the Mozdok-Tbilisi pipeline in the Russian border region of North Ossetia. The electricity transmission line in Russia's southern region of Karachayevo-Cherkessiya near the Georgian border was brought down by an explosion just hours later. Georgian president Mikhail Saakashvili blamed Russia for putting pressure on Georgia's energy system at the time of the coldest weather.

On 1 November 2006 Gazprom announced that it will construct a direct gas pipeline to Georgia's breakaway region of South Ossetia. The work on the pipeline started just before South Ossetia's 12 November referendum on separating from Georgia. Starting 1 January 2007 Gazprom increased natural gas prices to Georgia following an international incident in an alleged effort to strongly influence the Georgian leadership's defiance of Moscow. The current price is US$235 per thousand cubic meters, which is the highest among the CIS countries.

The August 2008 military conflict between Georgia and Russia over the autonomous region of South Ossetia, which has been de facto independent from Georgia since the early 1990s, is likely to shift the balance of power between the main players involved in the formation of the future of the Caspian and Central Asian energy sector, including:

- Producer and transit countries: Azerbaijan, Georgia, Kazakhstan, Turkmenistan, Uzbekistan, Turkey and Iran;
- Foreign corporations operating in the region's hydrocarbon sector;
- Major external players: China, Russia, the European Union and the United States.

The volatility of these transit routes is likely to shape investment decisions of international oil companies involved in the development of Central Asian and Caspian hydrocarbons and their transportation to global markets. Governments of these resource-rich countries are bound to have serious concerns about the safety of BTC, WREP and BTE pipelines, the railway networks and the oil terminals at the Georgian Black Sea ports of Batumi, Kulevi and Poti, all of which were halted by the Georgian-Russian hostilities. Although, the pipelines were only temporarily shut down for security reasons and were not targeted or damaged in the conflict, their future expansion and the construction of related new pipeline projects, such as the Kazakh-Caspian Transportation System, the Trans-Caspian gas pipeline and Nabucco are now uncertain. In this situation, Central Asian and Caspian producers may opt for traditional exports via Russia (providing Moscow successfully expands the capacity of its oil and gas export routes) and the new export pipelines to China.

==== Lithuania ====
On 29 July 2006 Russia shut down oil export to Mažeikių oil refinery in Lithuania after an oil spill on the Druzhba pipeline system occurred in Russia's Bryansk oblast, near the point where a line to Belarus and Lithuania branches off the main export pipeline. Transneft said it would need one year and nine months to repair the damaged section. Although Russia cited technical reasons for stopping oil deliveries to Lithuania, Lithuania claims that the oil supply was stopped because Lithuania sold the Mažeikių refinery to Polish company PKN Orlen in an effort to avoid the refinery and infrastructure being bought out by Russian interests. Russian crude oil is now being transshipped via the Būtingė oil terminal.

==== Poland ====
There has been rapprochement with Tusk's government in Warsaw, after two years of tensions with the conservative government of Kaczynski. The cooperation on the Yamal-Europe pipeline has continued without serious problems. Nevertheless, some disagreements concerning control of the Yamal-Europe pipeline and transit pricing remain. Despite attempts to relieve tensions, consecutive Polish governments strongly oppose the Nord Stream project bypassing Poland and favour further development of overland alternatives. It remains a contentious issue that as a result of the Russian-Ukrainian gas dispute in 2009, Polish PGNIG gas company did not receive contracted supplies of Russian gas from Ukraine.

==== Ukraine ====
At the beginning of 2006 Russia greatly increased the price of gas for Ukraine to bring it in line with market values. The dispute between Russian state-owned gas supplier Gazprom and Ukraine over natural gas prices started in March 2005 (over the price of natural gas and prices for the transition of Gazprom's gas to Europe). The two parties were unable to reach an agreement to resolve the dispute, and Russia cut gas exports to Ukraine on 1 January 2006 at 10:00 MSK. The supply was restored on 4 January, when a preliminary agreement between two gas companies was settled. Other disputes arose in October 2007 and in January 2009, this dispute again resulted in 18 European countries reporting major falls or cut-offs of their gas supplies from Russia transported through Ukraine. Gas supplies restarted on 20 January 2009 and were fully restored on 21 January 2009.

=== EU-Russia Energy Dialogue ===
The EU-Russia Energy Dialogue was launched at the EU-Russia Summit in Paris in October 2000. François Lamoureux, Director general for Energy and Transport at the European Commission and Viktor Khristenko, Vice-Prime Minister of the Russian Federation took up the responsibility as sole interlocutors. Christian Cleutinx, then Head of Unit at the European Commission was designated as the Coordinator of the dialogue. At the working level the Energy Dialogue consists three thematic working groups. The Energy Dialogue involves the EU Member States, energy industry and the international financial institutions. Projected gas pipelines originating in Russia and supplying Europe.

=== Ratification of the Energy Charter Treaty ===
Russia signed the Energy Charter Treaty in 1994, but flatly refused to ratify its current revision. Russia's main objections to the ratification revolve around the proviso about the third party access to the pipelines and transit fees. Notwithstanding the fact that Russia didn't ratify the treaty, Ivan Materov, State Secretary and Deputy Minister of Industry and Energy of the Russian Federation, serves as the vice-chairman of the Energy Charter Conference, and Andrei Konoplyanik as the Deputy Secretary General.

Russia and the European Union have also failed to finalize the negotiations on the Energy Charter Protocol on Transit. The main issue remain open is how, and to what extent, the Protocol will include mechanisms for establishment long term transit arrangements. Also the third party access to its pipeline infrastructure has remained Russia's main objection to the Protocol.

== Controversies ==
=== Corruption ===
According to the estimation of Swedish economist Anders Åslund in 2008, 50% of the state-owned Gazprom's investments were lost through corrupt practices. For instance, the Russian section of Blue Stream pipeline was three times more expensive to construct per kilometer than the Turkish section of the pipeline.

Experts believe Bill Browder's "visa problem" is related to that he made questions about Gazprom's murky intermediates which receive money from Gazprom.

=== Oil-for-Food Programme ===
The Russian government and Russian energy companies were beneficiaries in the Oil-for-Food Programme.

=== OPEC temporarily lowering the price of oil ===
Crude oil prices declined from over 100 dollars a barrel in 2014 to below 50 US dollars in 2015. Russia tried and failed to get OPEC support for production cutbacks, and ramped up its oil production to reduce the drop in oil revenues. OPEC's oil glut supply policy affected the Russian economy and energy policy.

There were controversies about the reasons for OPEC's policy for reducing the price of oil. Russia responded to OPEC's policy by increasing dialogue with OPEC.

== See also ==
- Economy of Russia
- Energy in Russia
- Coal in Russia
- Oil reserves in Russia
- Petroleum industry in Russia
- Russia in the European energy sector
- Energy diplomacy
- Energy policy
  - Energy policy of the European Union
  - Energy policy of the Soviet Union
- Energy superpower
- Russie.NEI.Visions in English
- EU-Russia Centre
- Petroleum exploration in the Arctic
- European countries by fossil fuel use (% of total energy)
- European countries by electricity consumption per person
- List of exports of Russia
- World energy resources
