= RNV =

RNV may refer to:

- Armavia (ICAO: RNV), a former Armenian airline (1996–2013)
- Cleveland Municipal Airport (Mississippi) (FAA: RNV)
- Radio Nacional de Venezuela, a government radio station in Venezuela that began broadcasting in 1936
- Raniwara railway station (station code: RNV), in Jalor district, Rajasthan, India
- Rhein-Neckar-Verkehr, German transport company
- Russie.NEI.Visions in English, an online collection of policy papers
- Rhythm & Vines (RnV) annual music festival near Gisborne, New Zealand

== See also ==
- RNVR, British Royal Navy Reserve
- RVN (disambiguation)
