= Antonenko =

Antonenko or Antonenka (Ukrainian or Russian: Антоненко, Belarusian: Антоненка) is a gender-neutral Ukrainian surname that may refer to

- Aleksandr Antonenko (born 1975), Latvian singer
- Andriy Antonenko (born 1971), Ukrainian soldier and musician
- Borys Antonenko-Davydovych (1899–1984), Ukrainian writer, translator and linguist
- Irina Antonenko (born 1991), Russian actress and model
- Oksana Antonenko, Russian economist
- Oleg Antonenko (born 1971), Belarusian ice hockey player
