= RVM =

RVM may refer to:

== Companies and organizations ==
- Reich Ministry of Transport (Reichsverkehrsministerium), German government agency (1919–1945)
- Religious of the Virgin Mary, an ecclesiastical community of Filipino Roman Catholic women
- Rayo Vallecano de Madrid, a football club

== Mathematics, science, medicine and technology ==
- Red Velvet Mite, arachnids known for their bright red colors
- Rostral ventromedial medulla, a group of neurons in the medulla oblongata
- Real-valued measurable, an axiom asserting the existence of a real-valued measurable cardinal number
- Reference Verification Methodology, a method for functional verification of complex designs
- Relevance vector machine, a machine learning technique.
- Reverse vending machine, a sensor-based machine for sorting and recycling
- Ruby Version Manager, a software tool to manage Ruby programming language versions
- "RVM", abbreviation for the Jikes Research Virtual Machine
- .rvm - file extension associated with PDMS

== Other uses ==
- "RVM", station code for Richmond Main Street Station, Richmond, Virginia
- Royal Victorian Medal, Commonwealth military decoration post-nominal letters

== See also ==
- RVN (disambiguation)
