= Thomas Gomart =

French historian (born 1973)

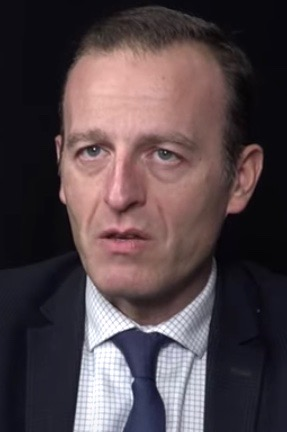
- Gomart in 2023
- Born: Thomas Jacques Dominique Gomart; 13 March 1973 (age 53); Pau, France
- Education: Paris 1 Panthéon-Sorbonne University
- Occupation: Historian
- Known for: Director of the Institut français des relations internationales (2015–present)

Thomas Jacques Dominique Gomart (French pronunciation: [tɔma ɡɔmaʁ]; born 13 March 1973) is a French historian of international relations who has been director of the Institut français des relations internationales (IFRI) since 2015. He was previously vice-president for strategic development at the IFRI, and director of the Russia/NIS Center and of the trilingual electronic collection Russie.NEI.Visions in English.

Gomart holds a PhD in History from Paris 1 Panthéon-Sorbonne University. A Lavoisier Fellow at the State Institute for International Relations (University-MGIMO – Moscow), visiting fellow at the European Union Institute for Security Studies (Paris) and Marie Curie Fellow at Department of War Studies (King's College London), Gomart writes on Russia and the post-Soviet area, especially Russia–EU–US relations and Russian civil–military relations. He is currently studying the concept of cyberpower.

Gomart is teaching at the French Military School of Saint-Cyr (use of military power in international relations and geopolitics of energy). He regularly contributes articles to French and international media.

== Honours ==
- Knight of the Ordre national du Mérite (2025)

== Publications ==
1. Editor
- Russian Energy Security and Foreign Policy, London, Routledge, 2011, 253 p (with A. Dellecker)
- Russie.Nei.Visions 2009, Understanding Russia and New Independent States, Paris, Ifri-Documentation française, 2009, 248 p (with T. Kastueva-Jean)
- Russie.Nei.Visions 2008, Understanding Russia and New Independent States, Paris, Ifri-Documentation française, 2008, 180 p (avec T. Kastueva-Jean)
- “Russie: Enjeux intérieurs et internationaux”, Politique étrangère, n° spécial, 2007, 245 p.
- Russie.Nei.Visions 2007, Understanding Russia and New Independent States, Paris, Ifri-Documentation française, 2007, 180 p (avec T. Kastueva-Jean)
- Russie.Nei.Visions 2006, Understanding Russia and New Independent States, Paris, Ifri-Documentation française, 2006, 180 p (avec T. Kastueva-Jean)
1. Books
- Russian Civil-Military Relations: Putin’s Legacy, Washington DC, Carnegie Endowment for International Peace, 2008, 128 p, foreword by D. Trenin
- Double détente, Les relations franco-soviétiques de 1958 à 1964, Paris, Publications de la Sorbonne, 2003, 494 p, foreword by R. Frank (Institut de France, Prix Jean-Baptiste Duroselle, 2003)
- Les Rapports russo-français vus de Moscou, Paris, Les notes de l’Ifri, n° 41, 2002, 84 p, foreword by D. David
- Un lycée dans la Tourmente, (directed by J-P. Levert, with A. Merville), Paris, Calmann-Lévy, 1994, 267 p, foreword by R. Rémond
1. Chapters
- « La diplomatie culturelle française à l’égard de l’URSS : objectifs, moyens et obstacles (1956-1966)», in J-F. Sirinelli et G-H. Soutou, Culture et Guerre froide, Paris, PUPS, 2008, p. 173-188
- « Les services de renseignement français face à la menace soviétique au début des années soixante (1958-1964) », in B. Warusfel, Le Renseignement, Guerre, technique et politique (XIXe-XXe siècles), Paris, Lavauzelle-CEHD, 2007, p. 203-220
- « Le dispositif du PCF dans les relations franco-soviétiques (1958-1964) », in M. Vaïsse, De Gaulle et la Russie, Paris, Cnrs éditions, 2006, p. 125-138
- « Russie : trop-plein d’énergies ou d’inerties », in T. de Montbrial et P. Moreau Defarges, Ramses 2006, Paris, Dunod, 2005, p. 79-94
- « Russie, Retour vers 2008 », in T. de Montbrial and P. Moreau Defarges, Ramses 2005, Paris, Dunod, 2004, p. 300-302
- « Russie, Vladimir Poutine aux commandes », in T. de Montbrial and P. Moreau Defarges, Ramses 2004, Paris, Dunod, 2003, p. 328-330
- « Les dilemmes de la coopération : prévention des conflits, gestion des crises et règlement des conflits », in D. Lynch, EU-Russian Security Dimensions, Paris, IES, Occasional Papers, n° 46, July 2003, p. 20-41
1. Articles (since 2003)
- « Politique étrangère française : déni ou dénigrement ? », Revue des deux mondes, October 2014.
- « Think tanks à la française », with Thierry de Montbrial, Le Débat, September–October 2014.
- « Crimée : retour du passé et fuite en avant », Revue des deux mondes, June 2014.
- « Ukraine-Russie : vers une nouvelle guerre ? Entretien avec Pierre Hassner », Revue des deux mondes, June 2014.
- « Diplomates et réseaux sociaux : entretien avec Carl Bildt », Revue des deux mondes, March 2014.
- « De quoi Snowden est-il le nom ? », Revue des deux mondes, December 2013.
- « Pour une histoire des relations internationales ou vers une histoire globale », Revue des deux mondes, February 2013, pp. 59–65, interview with Robert Frank.
- « De la diplomatie numérique », Revue des deux mondes, January 2013, pp. 131–141.
- « Russie: un positionnement international en voie de redéfinition », Questions internationales, n° 57, September–October 2012, pp. 47–54.
- « La France, charnière centrale de l'Europe », Revue des deux mondes, April 2012, pp. 66–78 (avec Etienne de Durand).
- « Vladimir Poutine: Mâle dominant de toutes les Russies? », Revue des deux mondes, January 2012, pp. 51–58.
- « Ecrire l'histoire des relations internationales après WikiLeaks », Revue des deux mondes, May 2011, pp. 83–94.
- « Russian Civil-Military Relations: Is There Something New with Medvedev? », in S. Blank (ed.), Civil-Military Relations in Medvedev’s Russia, Strategic Studies Institute, US Army War College, January 2011, pp. 77–102.
- « Dva orientira dliâ Rossii », Russia in Global Affairs, December 2010.
- « Fragile colosse du monde multipolaire », Revue des deux mondes, October–November 2010, pp. 76–84.
- «Europe in Russian Foreign Policy: Important but no longer Pivotal », Russie.Nei.Visions, No. 50, May 2010.
- «OTAN-Russie : la "question russe" est-elle européenne ? », Politique étrangère, No. 4, 2009.
- « Washington-Moscou : la nouvelle donne », Politique internationale, No. 123, 2009, pp. 247–264
- « Obama and Russia : Facing the Heritage of the Bush Years », Russie.Nei.Visions, n° 39, April 2009, 22 p
- « Rossiâ odna navsegda? », Russia in Global Affairs, No. 5, 2008, pp. 140–150
- « Russia Alone Forever? The Kremlin’s Strategic Solitude », Politique étrangère, special issue “World Policy Conference”, 2008, pp. 23–33
- « EU-Russia Relations: Toward a Way Out of Depression », in A. Kuchins and T. Gomart, Europe, Russia, and the US: Finding A New Balance, Washington, Ifri/Csis, Transatlantic Project, July 2008, 23 p
- « L’Europe marginalisée », Politique internationale, No. 118, 2008, pp. 209–221
- « Evropa, Rossiâ i SSA: novye velitchiny starovo uravneniâ », Russia in Global Affairs, No. 1, 2008, pp. 154–166
- « Paris and the EU-Russia dialogue : A New Impulse with Nicolas Sarkozy? », Russie.Nei.Visions, No. 23, October 2007, 24 p.
- « Union européenne/Russie : de la stagnation à la dépression », Revue du marché commun et de l’Union européenne, No. 510, 2007, pp. 423–429
- « Quelle place pour la Russie en Europe ? », Questions internationales, No. 27, 2007, pp. 42–48
- « France’s Russia Policy: Balancing Interests and Values », The Washington Quarterly, No. 2, 2007, pp. 147–155
- « Rossijskij vector politiki Parija: preodolet’ status-kvo », Vestnik Analitiki, No. 1, 2007, pp. 53-66
- « La politique russe de la France : fin de cycle ? », Politique étrangère, No. 1, 2007, pp. 123-135
- « The EU and Russia: The Needed Balance Between Geopolitics and Regionalism », Russie.Nei.Visions, No. 10(b), May 2006, 24 p
- « Quelle influence russe dans l’espace post-soviétique ? », Le courrier des pays de l’Est, No. 1055, 2006, pp. 4-13
- « Paradoks nepostoânstva », Russia in Global Affairs, No. 3, 2006, pp. 62-72
- « Politique étrangère russe : l’étrange inconstance », Politique étrangère, No. 1, 2006, pp. 25-36. « Russian Foreign Policy: Strange Inconsistency », UK MoD, CSRC, 06/12 (E), March 2006
- « L’Union européenne et la mer Noire : franchir un nouveau cap avec les moyens du bord », The Role of the Wider Black Sea Area in a Future European Security Space, Nato Defense College, Occasional Paper, No. 11, December 2005, pp. 13-22
- « Les quatre espaces : concept d’hier, d’aujourd’hui ou de demain », Evropa, No. 5, 2005
- « Putin’s Russia : Towards A New Combination Of Military And Foreign Policies », World Defence Systems, No. 2, 2004, pp. 42-44
- « Différer pour mieux attendre, La stratégie de l’Union européenne à l’égard de la Russie (1997-2003) », Matériaux pour l’histoire de notre temps, No. 76, 2004, pp. 48-53
- « Les trois enjeux du partenariat entre l’Union européenne et la Russie », Politique étrangère, No. 2, 2004, pp. 387-399
- « Le partenariat entre l’Union européenne et la Russie à l’épreuve de l’élargissement », Revue du Marché commun et de l’Union européenne, No. 479, 2004, pp. 349-354. « Enlargement Tests the Partnership Between the EU and Russia », UK MoD, CSRC, 04/23, August 2004
- « Gêner sans pénaliser, L’utilisation du dossier algérien par la diplomatie soviétique, 1958-1962 », Communisme, n° 74/75, 2003, p. 131-152
- « Vladimir Poutine ou les avatars de la politique étrangère russe », Politique étrangère, No. 3-4, 2003, pp. 789–802
- « Le PCF au miroir des relations franco-soviétiques (1964-1968) », Relations internationales, No. 114, 2003, pp. 249–266

== See also ==
=== Articles linked ===
- Russie.NEI.Visions in English
- Foreign relations of Russia
- Energy policy of Russia
