= Bazhenov Formation =

Oil-bearing rock formation in Russia

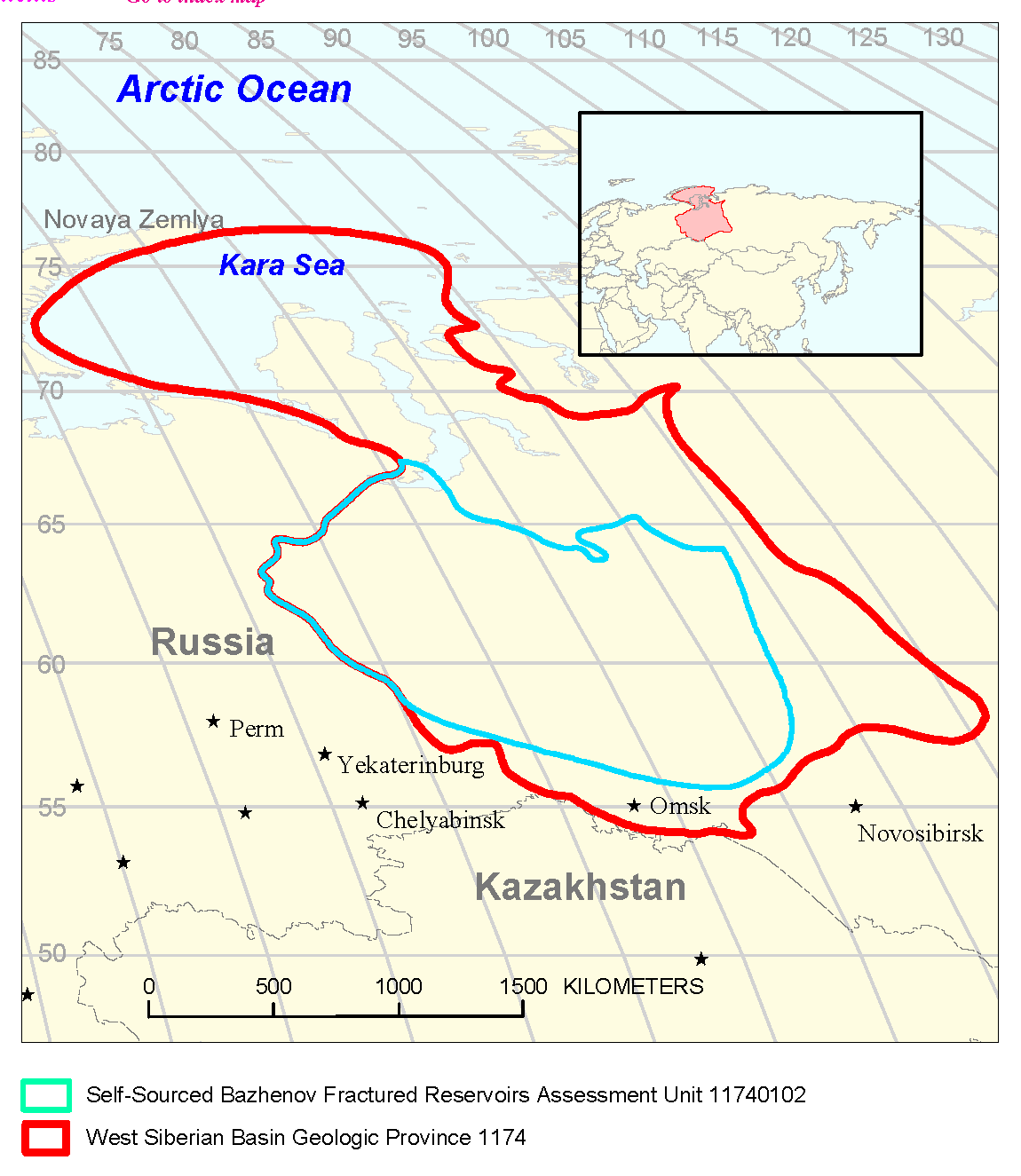
Map showing extent of the Bazhenov Formation continuous tight oil resource

The Bazhenov Formation or Bazhenov Shale is a geological stratum in the West Siberian basin. It was formed from sediment deposited in a deep-water sea in Tithonian–early Berriasian time. The sea covered more than one million square kilometers in the central basin area. Highly organic-rich siliceous shales were deposited during this time in anoxic conditions on the sea bottom. The sea was connected to the world's oceans and contains trace minerals derived from dissolved minerals and organic materials similar to sapropel sediments in the Black Sea.

In addition to being a prolific deep water marine source rock (the International Energy Agency has called it the world's largest oil source rock) the formation is believed to contain substantial reserves of unconventional liquid hydrocarbons in form of tight oil and solid hydrocarbons in form of kerogen. These deposits occur at depths of 2,500–3,000 metres (8,200–9,800 ft) with the thickness from 10 to 44 metres (33 to 144 ft).

An estimate by Wood Mackenzie of the Bazhenov Formation puts oil in place at 2 trillion barrels (3.2×10^{11} cubic metres). In 2013, the Russian oil company Rosneft estimated recoverable reserves of 22 billion barrels (3.5×10^{9} cubic metres) for the formation. The Russian government agency Rosnedra estimated in 2012 that the Bazhenov contained 180 to 360 billion barrels of recoverable reserves. According to U.S. Energy Information Administration estimates published in June 2013, the total Bazhenov shale prospective area has a resource of a risked tight oil in-place of 1,243 billion barrels (1.976×10^{11} cubic metres) and a risked shale gas in-place of 1,920 trillion cubic feet (54 trillion cubic metres), with 74.6 billion barrels (1.186×10^{10} cubic metres) of oil and 1,920 trillion cubic feet (54 trillion cubic metres) of gas as the risked, technically recoverable. Total hydrocarbon resources are estimated in 50 to 150 billion tonnes.

== See also ==
- Petroleum industry in Russia
