= Oil reserves in Russia =

Oil reserves located in Russia

There have been widely varying estimates of proven oil reserves in Russia. Most estimates included only Western Siberian reserves, which have been exploited since the 1970s and supply two-thirds of Russian oil. However, there are potentially huge reserves elsewhere. In 2005, the Russian Ministry of Natural Resources estimated that another 4.7 billion barrels (0.75×10^{9} m^{3}) of oil exist in Eastern Siberia. In July 2013, the Russian Natural Resources Ministry made official estimates of reserves available for the first time. According to Russian Natural Resources Minister Sergey Donskoy, as of 1 January 2012, recoverable reserves of oil in Russia under category ABC1 (equivalent to proven reserves) were 17.8 billion tons and category C2 reserves (equivalent to probable and possible) were 10.9 billion tons.

== History ==
Farman Salmanov was an Azerbaijani geologist famous for discovering great oil fields in Western Siberia in Tyumen Oblast in 1961.

== Production ==
Following the collapse of the Soviet Union, Russia's petroleum output fell sharply, and has rebounded only in the last several years. The Soviet Union reached a peak of 12.58 million barrels per day (2.000×10^{6} m^{3}/d) in total liquids in 1988, and production had fallen to around 6 million barrels per day (950×10^{3} m^{3}/d) by the mid-1990s. A turnaround in Russian oil output began in 1999, which many analysts attribute to the privatization of the industry. Higher world oil prices, the use of Japanese technology, and the rejuvenation of old oil fields also helped. By 2007 Russian production had recovered to 9.8 million barrels per day (1.56×10^{6} m^{3}/d), but was growing at a slower rate than 2002–2004. In 2008, production fell 1 percent in the first quarter and Lukoil vice president Leonid Fedun said $1 trillion would have to be spent on developing new reserves if current production levels were to be maintained. The editor-in-chief of the Russian Petroleum Investor claims that Russian production had reached a secondary peak in 2007.

In 2007, Russia produced roughly 9.8 million barrels per day (1.56×10^{6} m^{3}/d) of liquids, consumed roughly 2.8 million barrels per day (450×10^{3} m^{3}/d) in liquids, and exported (in net) around 7 million barrels per day (1.1×10^{6} m^{3}/d). Over 70 percent of Russian oil production was exported, while the remaining 30 percent was refined locally. In early 2008 Russian officials were reported to be concerned because, after rising just 2% during 2007, oil production started to decline again in 2008. The Russian government proposed tax cuts on oil in an attempt to stimulate production.

By 2011, Russian oil production had increased to 10.54 million barrels per day (1.676×10^{6} m^{3}/d). It is the second largest exporter of oil in the world.

In October 2018, Russia's crude oil output grew to 11.61 million barrels per day (1.846×10^{6} m^{3}/d), a new post-Soviet record.

== Reserve estimates ==
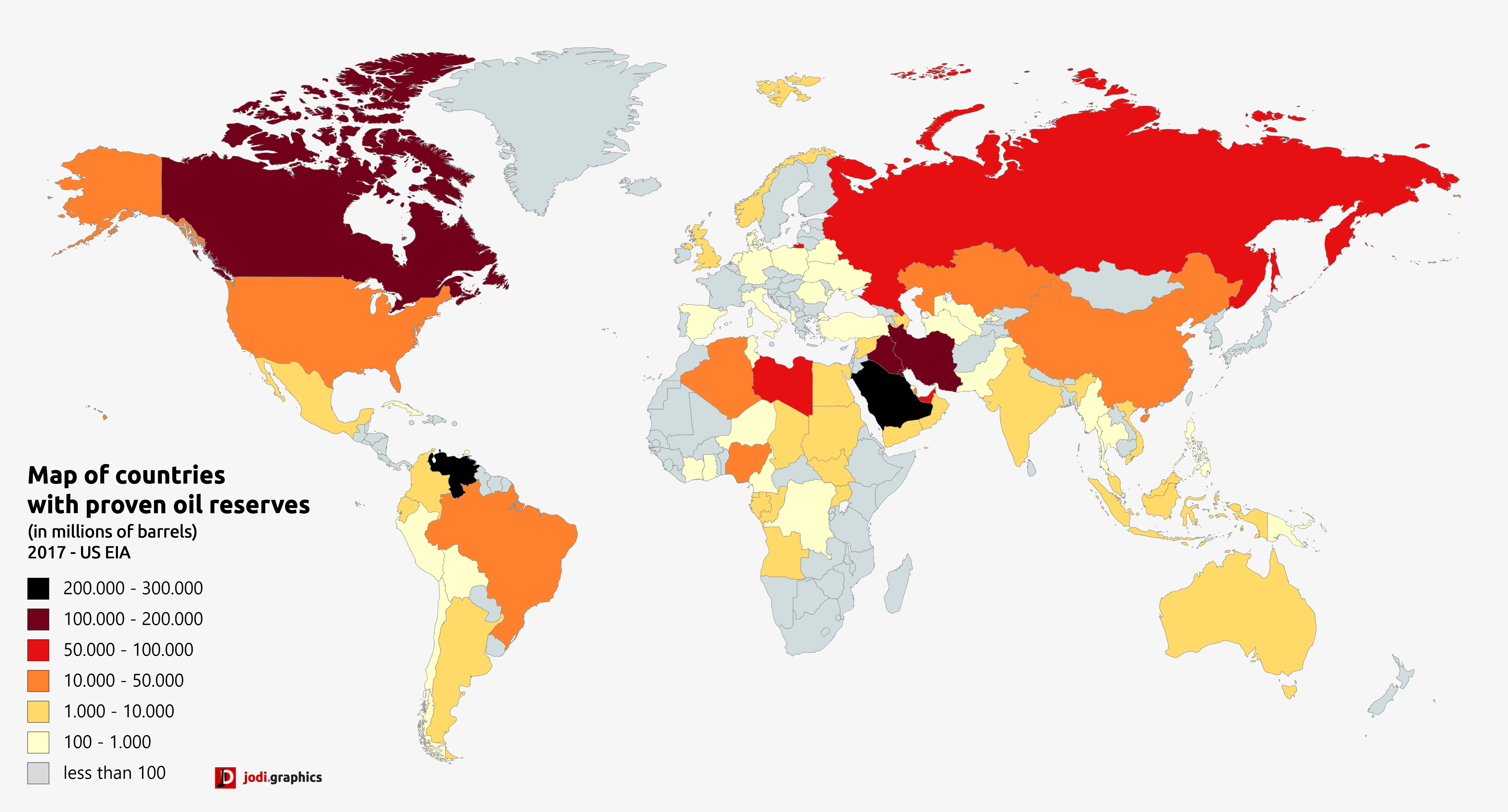
A map of world oil reserves according to U.S. EIA, 2017

The Russia reserve estimates in the table below were posted in 2006, except that from the US EIA

Estimates of Russian oil reserves, posted 2006
Source	10^{9} bbl	10^{9} m^{3}	Reserve class
Oil & Gas Journal	60	9.5	SPE proven
John Grace*	68	10.8	SPE proven
World Oil	69	11.0	SPE proven
BP	72	11.4	SPE proven
US Energy Information Administration	80	13	
10 largest Russian Oil Companies	82	13.0	ABC1
E Khartukov (Russian Oil Expert)	110	17	ABC1
United States Geological Survey	116	18.4	SPE proven
Ray Leonard (MOL)	119	18.9	ABC1
Wood Mackenzie	120	19	SPE proven
IHS Energy	120	19	ABC1
Mikhail Khodorkovsky	150	24	
Brunswick UBS (consultants)	180	29	SPE proven, probable, possible
DeGolyer & MacNaughton (audit)	200	32	unknown, possibly SPE proven

The ABC1 classification is based on the Russian system, and is that system's closest equivalent to the Society of Petroleum Engineers (SPE) proven reserves. It is regarded by some as somewhat less strict than the SPE proven reserves.

On 29 September 2014, President of the Union of Oil and Gas Producers of Russia Gennady Shmal told a press conference that Russia's discovered oil reserves (ABC1) stand at 17.8 billion tons (17.8 * 10^{12} m^{3}). He said that C2 reserves stand at 8 billion tons. The Russian designation ABC1 corresponds to proved reserves (proved developed producing, proved developed nonproducing, and proved undeveloped), while C2 corresponds to probable and possible reserves.

== Tight oil ==
Significant reserves of unconventional tight oil such as contained in the Bazhenov Formation are believed to exist in western Siberia. An estimate by Wood Mackenzie of the Bazhenov Formation was that it contained 2 trillion barrels of oil in place; achievable recovery factors are unknown.

== See also ==
- Economy of Russia
- Energy in Russia
- Energy policy of Russia
- Petroleum industry in Russia
- Russia in the European energy sector
