= Rusanovskoye gas field =

Natural gas field in Urals, Russia

Rusanovskoye
- Country: Russia
- Region: Yamalo-Nenets Autonomous Okrug
- Offshore/onshore: offshore
- Operator: Gazprom

Field history
- Discovery: around 1980

Production
- Estimated gas in place: 3×10^{12} m^{3} 151×10^{12} cu ft

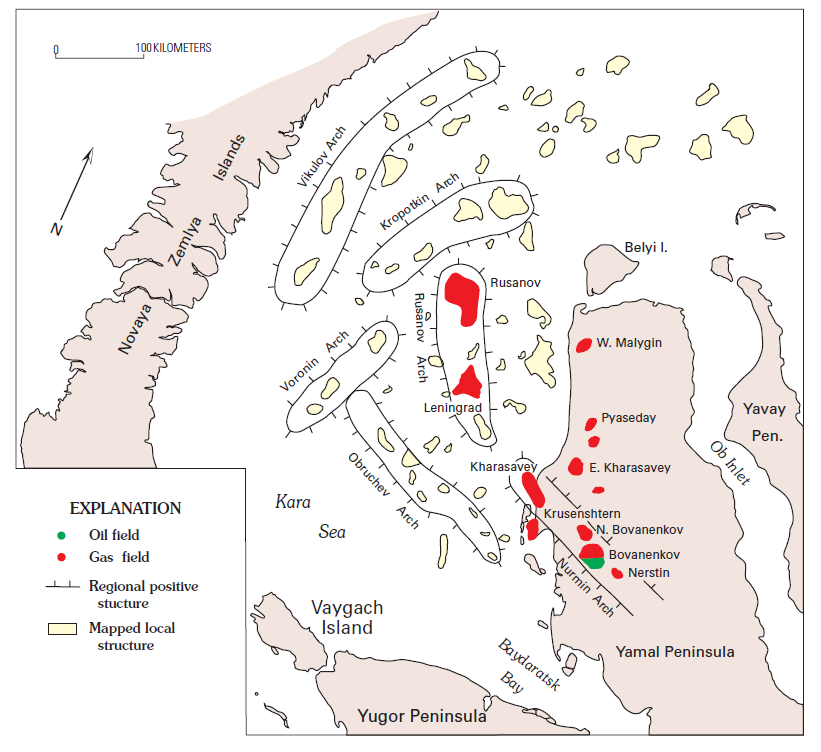
Kara Sea structural map

The Rusanovskoye gas field is a natural gas field located in the Yamalo-Nenets Autonomous Okrug. It was discovered around 1980 and is not yet in production.

== See also ==
- West Siberian petroleum basin
