= List of exports of Russia =

Exports of Russia by product category (2019) Chemical products Transportation Machines Mineral products Plastics and rubbers Metals Foodstuffs Precious metals Textiles Instruments Animal products Vegetable products Paper goods Footwear and headwear Miscellaneous Stone and glass Wood products Animal and vegetable bi-products Animal hides Arts and antiques Weapons

The following is a list some of the exports of Russia. Data is for 2019, in millions of United States dollars, as reported by the International Trade Centre.

== Exports ==
#	Export product	Value ($)
1	Crude Petroleum	121,443
2	Refined Petroleum	66,887
3	Unspecified commodities	55,265
4	Coal	15,987
5	Petroleum Gas	9,501
6	Wheat	6,399
7	Semi-Finished Iron	6,090
8	Gold	5,740
9	Platinum	5,121
10	Raw Aluminium	4,640
11	Sawn Wood	4,506
12	Oils	4,458
13	Copper	4,137
14	Diamonds	3,768
15	Chemical Fertilizers (Nitrogen, Phosphorus, Potassium)	3,165
16	Nitrogenous Fertilizers	2,896
17	Frozen Fish	2,497
18	Hot-Rolled Iron	2,462
19	Gas Turbines	2,352
20	Potassic Fertilizers	2,337

== See also ==
- Russian economy
