= Russie.NEI.Visions in English =

Russie.Eurasie.Visions (formerly Russie.NEI.Visions) is a digital collection created in 2005 by Thomas Gomart and published by the Russia/Eurasia Center of the French Institute of International Relations (IFRI). Its articles are published in three languages: French, English, and Russian. Relying on a network of leading experts and promising young researchers, it offers original analyses intended for public and private decision-makers, researchers, as well as for a wider public interested in the area.

== Publications issued ==
- Vera Grantseva and Rakhimbek Abdrakhmanov, Kazakhstan After the Double Shock of 2022: Political, Economic and Military Consequences, No.140, October 2025.
- Marlène Laruelle, War as Social Elevator: The Socioeconomic Impact of Russian Military Keynesianism, No.139, June 2025.
- Sergey Sukhankin, The Caspian Sea as an Emerging Energy Hub : Potentials and Limitations, No.138, February 2025.
- Pavel Baev, Commanders of Putin's Long War: Purged, Reshuffled and Disgruntled, No.137, December 2024.
- Irina Dezhina, Russia and the New BRICS Countries: Potentials and Limitations of a Scientific and Technological Cooperation, No.136, September 2024.
- Florian Vidal, Russia in the Arctic: The End of Illusions and the Emergence of Strategic Realignments, No.135, August 2024.
- Bobo Lo, Between Aspiration and Reality: Russia in the World (Dis)order, No.134, June 2024.
- Dimitri Minic, La politique russe d'Emmanuel Macron : étapes et racines d'une nouvelles approches, 2017-2024, No.133, April 2024.
- Vladislav Inozemtsev, Central Asia: Making Use of a Historic Opportunity, No.132, December 2023.
- Régis Genté, Georgia: Another Russian Front, No.131, December 2023.
- Pavel Baev, Russia’s New Challenges in the Baltic/Northern European Theater, No.130, November 2023.
- Vladislav Inozemtsev, The Exodus of the Century: A New Wave of Russian Emigration, No.129, July 2023.
- Florent Parmentier, Moldova, a Political System Under Pressure: Between European Aspirations and War in Ukraine, No.128, May 2023.
- Marlène Laruelle, Russia at War and the Islamic World, No.127, January 2023.
- Dimitri Minic, Russia's Invasion of Ukraine: A Political-Strategic Break?, No.126, March 2022.
- Marlène Laruelle, Russia’s Islam: Balancing Securitization and Integration, No.125, December 2021.
- Sergey Sukhankin, Kaliningrad in the Post-Crimea Russia. A Bastion or a Weak Link?, No.124, September 2021.
- Vladislav Inozemtsev, Russia: Can Economic Difficulties Weaken the Political System?, No.123, August 2021.
- Marlène Laruelle, Russia’s Niche Soft Power: Sources, Targets and Channels of Influence, No.122, April 2021.
- Bobo Lo, The Adaptation Game — Russia and Climate Change, No.121, March 2021.
- Sergey Sukhankin, Russian Private Military Contractors in Sub-Saharan Africa: Strengths, Limitations and Implications, No.120, September 2020.
- Andrey Pyatakov, Russia and Latin America: A Difficult Rapprochement, No.119, July 2020.
- Pavel Baev, Transformation of Russian Strategic Culture: Impacts from Local Wars and Global Confrontation, No.118, June 2020.
- Marlène Laruelle, Russia’s Arctic Policy: A Power Strategy and Its Limits, No.117, March 2020.
- Aleksei Zakharov, Friends in Need: Whither the Russia-India Strategic Partnership?, No.116, October 2019.
- Pavel Baev, Russian Nuclear Modernization and Putin’s Wonder-Missiles: Real Issues and False Posturing, No.115, August 2019.
- Arnaud Kalika, Russia’s "Great Return" to Africa?, No.114, April 2019.
- Marlène Laruelle, Russia’s Militia Groups and their Use at Home and Abroad, No.113, April 2019.
- Nadège Rolland, China’s Ambitions in Eastern Europe and the South Caucasus, No.112, December 2018.
- Barbara Kunz, Northern Europe’s Strategic Challenge from Russia: What Political and Military Responses?, No.111, October 2018.
- Ernest Vardanean, Moldova between Russia and the West: Internal Divisions behind the Commitment to European Integration, No.110, August 2018.
- Dima Adamsky, Moscow’s Syria Campaign: Russian Lessons for the Art of Strategy, No.109, July 2018.
- Bobo Lo, Chutzpah and Realism: Vladimir Putin and the Making of Russian Foreign Policy, No.108, June 2018.
- Pavel Baev, From Chechnya to Syria: The Evolution of Russia’s Counter-Terrorist Policy, No.107, April 2018.
- Jean-Robert Raviot, Putinism: A Praetorian System?, No.106, March 2018.
- Sarah Fainberg, Russian Spetsnaz, Contractors and Volunteers in the Syrian Conflict, No.105, December 2017.
- Céline Pajon, Japan-Russia: The Limits of a Strategic Rapprochement, No.104, October 2017.
- Mikhail Suslov, “Russian World”: Russia’s Policy towards its Diaspora, No.103, July 2017.
- Anaïs Marin, Minsk-Beijing: What Kind of Strategic Partnership?, No.102, June 2017.
- Isabelle Facon, Reforming Ukrainian Defense: No Shortage of Challenges, No.101, May 2017.
- Bobo Lo, New Order for Old Triangles? The Russia-China-India Matrix, No.100, April 2017.
- Marlène Laruelle, Kadyrovism: Hardline Islam as a Tool of the Kremlin?, No.99, March 2017.
- Erlan Karin, Central Asia: Facing Radical Islam, No.98, February 2017.
- Pavel Baev, Russia and Central and Eastern Europe: between Confrontation and Collusion, No.97, November 2016.
- Vladislav Inozemtsev, Russia's Economic Modernization: The Causes of a Failure, No.96, September 2016.
- Vyacheslav Likhachev, The Far Right in the Conflict between Russia and Ukraine, No.95, July 2016.
- Dmitri Trenin, Russia’s Asia Strategy: Bolstering the Eagle’s Eastern Wing, No.94, June 2016.
- Alexander Shumilin, Russia's Diplomacy in the Middle East: Back to Geopolitics, No.93, May 2016.
- Bobo Lo, The Illusion of Convergence: Russia, China, and the BRICS, No.92, March 2016.
- Lyubov Bisson, Russia’s Immigration Policy: New Challenges and Tools, No.91, January 2016.
- Leonid Polyakov, "Conservatism" in Russia: Political Tool or Historical Choice?, No.90, December 2015.
- Ivan Timofeev and Elena Alekseenkova, Eurasia in Russian Foreign Policy: Interests, Opportunities and Constraints, No.89, December 2015.
- Igor Bunin, and Alexey Makarkin, Russia: Business and State, No.88, November 2015.
- Mikhail Korostikov, Leaving to Come Back: Russian Senior Officials and the State-Owned Companies, No.87, August 2015.
- Vladimir Milov, Russia's New Energy Alliances: Mythology versus Reality, No.86, July 2015.
- Igor Delanoë, The Kurds: A Channel of Russian Influence in the Middle East?, No.85, June 2015.
- Tatiana Kastueva-Jean, Russia's Domestic Evolution, what Impact on its Foreign Policy, No.84, April 2015.
- Olena Bagno-Moldavsky, The Jewish Diaspora and the Russo-Ukrainian Crisis, No.83, March 2015.
- Bobo Lo, Frontiers New and Old: Russia’s Policy in Central Asia, No.82, January 2015.
- Marcin Koscienkowski and William Schreiber, Moldova's National Minorities: Why are they Euroskeptical?, No.81, November 2014.
- Nina Tynkkynen, Russia and Global Climate Governance, No.80, September 2014.
- Pyotr Kiryushin, "Green Economy": Opportunities and Constraints for Russian Companies, No.79, August 2014.
- Oleg Grytsaienko, The Crisis in Ukraine: An Insider's View, No.78, June 2014.
- Irina Dezhina, Russia's Academy of Sciences' Reform: Causes and Consequences for Russian Science, No.77, May 2014.
- Mikhail Korostikov, Russia: Youth and Politics, No.76, April 2014.
- Pavel Baev, Rosneft, Gazprom and the Government: the Decision-Making Triangle on Russia's Energy Policy, No.75, March 2014.
- Dominik Tolksdorf, The EU, Russia and the Eastern Partnership: What Dynamics under the New German Government?, No.74, February 2014.
- Andrei Panibratov, The Influence of the State on Expanding Russian MNEs: Advantage or Handicap?, No.73, December 2013.
- Céline Pajon, Japan-Russia: Toward a Strategic Partnership?, No.72, September 2013.
- Ekaterina Stepanova, Afghanistan after 2014: The Way Forward for Russia, No.71, May 2013
- Nina Poussenkova, Russia's Eastern Energy Policy: A Chinese Puzzle for Rosneft, No.70, April 2013.
- Rémi Bourgeot, Russia-Turkey: A Relationship Shaped by Energy, No.69, March 2013.
- Ahmed Mehdi and Shamil Yenikeyeff, Governors, Oligarchs, and Siloviki: Oil and Power in Russia, No.68, February 2013.
- Richard Weitz, Deja Vu with BMD: The Improbability of Russia-NATO Missile Defense, No.67, January 2013.
- Dmitri Miroshnichenko, The WTO and the Customs Union: What Consequences for the Russian Banking Sector?, No.66, October 2012.
- Pavel Baev, Russia's Arctic Policy and the Northern Fleet Modernization, No.65, August 2012.
- Dominic Fean, Decoding Russia's WTO Accession, No.64, February 2012.
- Alexey Sidorenko, Russian Digital Dualism: Changing Society, Manipulative State, No.63, December 2011.
- Nadezhda Arbatova, Italy, Russia's Voice in Europe?, No.62, September 2011.
- Aleksey Malashenko, What the North Caucasus Means to Russia, No.61, July 2011.
- Pavel Baev, The Caucasus: a Hotbed of Terrorism in Metamorphosis, No.60, July 2011.
- Julien Nocetti, "Digital Kremlin": Power and the Internet in Russia, No.59, April 2011.
- Alena Ledeneva and Stanislav Shekshina, Doing Business in Russia: Informal Practices and Anti-Corruption Strategies, No.58, March 2011.
- Irina Dezhina, Developing Research in Russian Universities, No.57, February 2011.
- Olena Bagno and Zvi Magen, Israel's Immigrant Parties: An Inefficient Russia Lobby, No.56, December 2010.
- Andrej Kreutz, Syria: Russia's Best Asset in the Middle East, No.55, November 2010.
- Stephen Blank, Russia's Far East Policy: Looking Beyond China, No.54, August 2010.
- R. Craig Nation, Results of the 'Reset' in US-Russian Relations, No.53, July 2010.
- Julien Nocetti, From Moscow to Mecca: Russia's Saudi Arabian Diplomacy, No.52, June 2010.
- Richard Sakwa, Russia and Turkey: Rethinking Europe to Contest Outsider Status, No.51, May 2010.
- Thomas Gomart, Europe in Russian Foreign Policy: Important but no longer Pivotal, No.50, May 2010.
- Mark N. Katz, Russia's Greater Middle East Policy: Securing Economic Interests, Courting Islam, No.49, April 2010.
- Jeffrey Mankoff, Internal and External Impact of Russia's Economic Crisis, No.48, March 2010.
- Bobo Lo, Russia, China and the United States: From Strategic Triangularism to the Postmodern Triangle, No.47, February 2010.
- Timofei Bordachev, Georgia, Obama, the Economic Crisis: Shifting Ground in Russia-EU Relations, No.46, January 2010.
- Andrei Tsygankov, What Is China To Us? Westernizers and Sinophiles in Russian Foreign Policy, No.45, December 2009.
- Dominic Fean, Making Good Use of the EU in Georgia: "Eastern Partnership and Conflict Policy", No.44, September 2009.
- Jean-Philippe Tardieu, Russia and the “Eastern Partnership” after the War in Georgia, No.43, August 2009.
- Eva Hagström Frisell and Ingmar Oldberg, “Cool Neighbors”: Sweden’s EU Presidency and Russia, No.42, July 2009.
- Anatoly Vichnevsky, The Challenges of Russia’s Demographic Crisis, No.41, June 2009.
- Aurel Braun, NATO and Russia: Post-Georgia Threat Perceptions, No.40, May 2009.
- Thomas Gomart, Obama and Russia: Facing the Heritage of the Bush Years, No.39, April 2009.
- Stephen Blank, Russia in Latin America: Geopolitical Games in the US’s Neighborhood, No.38, April 2009.
- Roger McDermott, Russia’s Armed Forces: The Power of Illusion, No.37, March 2009.
- Nargis Kassenova, China as an Emerging Donor in Tajikistan and Kyrgyzstan, No.36, January 2009.
- Didier Chaudet, Islamist Terrorism in Greater Central Asia: The “Al-Qaedaization” of Uzbek Jihadism, No.35, December 2008.
- Stephen Aris, Russian Chinese Relations through the Lens of the SCO, No.34, September 2008.
- Andrey Kortunov, Academic Cooperation between Russia and the US. Moving Beyond Technical Aid?, No.33, August 2008.
- Kerry Longhurst, Injecting More Differentiation in European Neighbourhood Policy: What Consequences for Ukraine?, No.32, July 2008.
- Adrian Dellecker, Caspian Pipeline Consortium, Bellwether of Russia’s Investment Climate?, No.31, June 2008.
- Carole Sigman, The Impact of "New Public Management" on Russian Higher Education, No.30, April 2008.
- Boris Saltykov, Higher Education in Russia: How to Overcome the Soviet Heritage?, No.29, April 2008.
- Tatiana Kastueva-Jean, Higher Education, the Key to Russia's Competitiveness, No.28, April 2008.
- Gaïdz Minassian, Armenia, a Russian Outpost in the Caucasus?, No.27, February 2008.
- Catherine Locatelli, EU Gas Liberalization as a Driver of Gazprom's Strategies?, No.26, February 2008.
- Jakub M. Godzimirski, High Stakes in the High North. Russian-Norwegian Relations and their Implication for the EU, No.25, December 2007.
- Dominique Finon, Russia and the "Gas-OPEC". Real or Perceived Threat?, No.24, November 2007.
- Thomas Gomart, Paris and the EU-Russia Dialogue: A New Impulse with Nicolas Sarkozy?, No.23, October 2007.
- Louis-Marie Clouet, Rosoboronexport, Spearhead of the Russian Arms Industry, No.22, September 2007.
- Oksana Antonenko, Russia and the Deadlock over Kosovo, No.21, July 2007.
- Nadezhda Arbatova, Russie-EU beyond 2007. Russian Domestic Debates, No.20, June 2007.
- Arnaud Dubien, The Opacity of Russian-Ukrainian Energy Relations, No.19, May 2007.
- Jérôme Guillet, Gazprom as a Predictable Partner. Another Reading of the Russian-Ukrainian and Russian-Belarusian Energy Crises, No.18, March 2007.
- Christophe-Alexandre Paillard, Gazprom, the Fastest Way to Energy Suicide, No.17, March 2007.
- Julien Vercueil, Russia and the WTO: On the Finishing Stretch, No.16, February 2007.
- Jean-Pierre Massias, Russia and the Council of Europe: Ten Years Wasted?, No.15, January 2007.
- Tatiana Kastueva-Jean, The "Greatness and Misery" of Higher Education in Russia, No.14, September 2006.
- Vladimir Milov, The EU-Russia Energy Dialogue: Competition Versus Monopolies, No.13, September 2006.
- Murat Laumulin, The Shanghai Cooperation Organization as "Geopolitical Bluff?" A View from Astana, No.12, July 2006.
- Tracey German, Abkhazia and South Ossetia: Collision of Georgian and Russian Interests, No.11, June 2006.
- Special Issue: Workshop on EU-Russia relations, No.10, May 2006:
  - Andrew Monaghan, Russia, NATO and the EU: A European Security Triangle or Shades of a New Entente?.
  - Thomas Gomart, The EU and Russia: the Needed Balance Between Geopolitics and Regionalism.
  - Timofei Bordachev, Representing Private Interests to Increase Trust in Russia-EU Relations.
  - Michael Thumann, Multiplying Sources as the Best Strategy for EU-Russia Energy Relations.
- James Sherr, Ukraine's Scissors: between Internal Weakness and External Dependence, No.9, March 2006.
- Fiona Hill and Omer Taspinar, Russia and Turkey in the Caucasus: Moving Together to Preserve the Status Quo?, No.8, January 2006.
- Timofei Bordachev, UE Crisis: What Opportunities for Russia?, No.7, October 2005.
- Double issue on Russian-German relations, No.6, September 2005:
  - Andrei Zagorski, Russia and Germany: Continuity and Changes.
  - Hannes Adomeit, Germany's Policy on Russia: End of the Honeymoon?.
- Andrew Monaghan, From Plans to Substance: EU-Russia Relations During the British Presidency, No.5, August 2005.
- Irina Dezhina, Russian Scientists: Where Are they? Where Are They Going? Human Resources and Research Policy in Russia, No.4, June 2005.
- William Tompson, Re-Writing Russia's Subsoil Law: from Sovereignty to Civil Law?, No.3, May 2005.
- Dov Lynch, Shared Neighbourhood or New Frontline? The Crossroads in Moldova, No.2, April 2005.
- Bobo Lo, A Fine Balance - The Strange Case of Sino-Russian Relations, No.1, April 2005.

== Russie.Eurasie.Reports ==
Launched in September 2009, Russie.Nei.Reports is an electronic collection providing extensive analysis based on fieldwork. Papers are published either in French or in English.

- Dimitri Minic, Russia's Nuclear Deterrence Put to the Test by the War in Ukraine, No.49, October 2025.
- Yuri Fedorov, Russian Military Manpower After Two and a Half Years of War in Ukraine, No.48, November 2024.
- Dmitri Goudkov, Vladislav Inozemtsev, Dmitri Nekrassov, The New Russian Diaspora: Europe’s Challenge and Opportunity, No.47, June 2024.
- Marlène Laruelle, Russia’s Ideological Construction in the Context of the War in Ukraine, No.46, March 2024.
- Olivier Ferrando, Islam, politique et société en Ouzbékistan : enquête sur le renouveau religieux de la jeunesse ouzbèke, No.45, January 2024.
- Dimitri Minic, What Does the Russian Army Think About its War in Ukraine? Criticisms, Recommendations, Adaptations, No.44, September 2023.
- Florian Vidal, Russia’s Mining Strategy: Geopolitical Ambitions and Industrial Challenges, No.43, April 2023.
- Bobo Lo, The Sino-Russian Partnership: Assumptions, Myths and Realities, No.42, March 2023.
- Michaël Levystone, Connectivity in Central Asia at the Crossroads of International Crises: Transport, Energy and Water from Interdependence to New Cooperation Ways, No.41, November 2022.
- Pavel Baev, Russia’s War in Ukraine: Misleading Doctrine, Misguided Strategy, No.40, October 2022.
- Michaël Levystone, Le Kazakhstan à l’épreuve des crises : des émeutes de janvier 2022 à la guerre en Ukraine, No.39, September 2022.
- Régis Genté, Cercles dirigeants russes : infaillible loyauté au système Poutine ?, No.38, July 2022.
- Clément Therme, The Russian-Iran Partnership in a Multipolar World, No.37, March 2022.
- Bobo Lo, Rewinding the Clock? US-Russia Relations in the Biden Era, No.36, February 2022.
- Pavel Baev, Russia and Turkey. Strategic Partners and Rivals, No.35, May 2021.
- Julien Nocetti, The Outsider: Russia in the Race for Artificial Intelligence, No.34, December 2020.
- Leonid Litra and Alyona Getmanchuk, One Year of Zelensky’s Presidency: One Step Forward, One Step Back, No.33, October 2020.
- Andrey Paratnikau (Porotnikov), Un régime dans la tourmente : le système de sécurité intérieure et extérieure du Bélarus, No. 32, August 2020.
- Tatiana Kastouéva-Jean, (dir.), Olga Konkka, Nikolaï Koposov, Emilia Koustova, Denis Volkov, Tatiana Zhurzhenko, Mémoire de la Seconde Guerre mondiale dans la Russie actuelle, No. 31, June 2020.
- Olga Konkka, Quand la guerre s’invite à l’école : la militarisation de l’enseignement en Russie, No. 30, May 2020.
- Bobo Lo, The Return: Russia and the Security Landscape of Northeast Asia, No. 29, March 2020.
- Tatiana Mitrova and Vitaly Yermakov, Russia’s Energy Strategy-2035: Struggling to Remain Relevant, No. 28, December 2019.
- Bobo Lo, Greater Eurasia: The Emperor’s New Clothes or an Idea whose Time Has Come?, No. 27, July 2019.
- Dmitry Gorenburg and Paul Schwartz, Russia's Relations with South-East Asia, No. 26, March 2019.
- Vladislav Inozemtsev, Kremlin-Linked Forces in Ukraine's 2019 Elections: On the Brink of Revenge?, No. 25, February 2019.
- Stephen Blank and Younkyoo Kim, Making Sense of Russia's Policy in Afghanistan, No. 24, September 2018.
- Ekaterina Stepanova, Russia’s Afghan Policy in the Regional and Russia-West Contexts, No. 23, May 2018.
- Richard Sakwa, Russo-British Relations in the Age of Brexit, No. 22, February 2018.
- Aurélie Bros, There Will Be Gas: Gazprom's Transport Strategy in Europe, No. 21, October 2015.
- Julien Nocetti, Guerre de l'information : le web russe dans le conflit en Ukraine, No. 20, September 2015.
- Pavel Baev, Ukraine: a Test for Russian Military Reforms, No. 19, May 2015.
- Aurélie Bros, Gazprom in Europe: a Business Doomed to Fail?, No. 18, July 2014.
- Bobo Lo, Russia's Eastern Direction—Distinguishing the Real from the Virtual, No. 17, January 2014.
- Tatiana Mitrova, Russian LNG: The Long Road to Export, No. 16, December 2013.
- Pascal Grouiez, OMC: quel impact pour le secteur agricole russe ?, No. 15, December 2012.
- Nargis Kassenova, Kazakhstan and Eurasian Economic Integration: Quick Start, Mixed Results and Uncertain Future, No. 14, November 2012.
- Tatiana Kastouéva-Jean, Entreprises et universités russes : de la coopération au recrutement, No. 13, October 2012.
- Alicja Curanovic, The Religious Diplomacy of the Russian Federation, No. 12, June 2012.
- Olga Shumylo-Tapiola, Ukraine at the Crossroads: Between the EU DCFTA and Customs Union, No. 11, April 2012.
- Julien Nocetti, Le Web en Russie : de la virtualité à la réalité politique ?, No. 10, March 2012.
- Tatiana Kastouéva-Jean, Université fédérale de l'Oural, une futur "Harvard régionale"?, No. 9, January 2012.
- Tatiana Kastouéva-Jean, L'université Goubkine: réservoir de cadres pour le secteur pétrolier et gazier, No. 8, June 2011.
- Dominic Fean, Economic Constraint and Ukraine's Security Policy, No. 7, May 2011.
- Bobo Lo, How the Chinese See Russia, No. 6, December 2010.
- Tatiana Kastouéva-Jean, "Soft power" russe: discours, outils, impact, No. 5, October 2010.
- Tatiana Kastouéva-Jean, Les universités privées, "mal-aimées" de l'enseignement supérieur russe, No. 4, September 2010.
- Carole Sigman, L'université technique Bauman: un atout majeur de la politique industrielle russe, No. 3, March 2010.
- Carole Sigman, Le Haut collège d'économie: école de commerce, université et think tank, No. 2, October 2009.
- Tatiana Kastouéva-Jean, Projet MISiS": futur modèle de l'enseignement supérieur en Russie?, No. 1, October 2009.

== See also ==
- Foreign relations of Russia
- Gazprom
- Thomas Gomart
