= Medvezhye gas field =

Natural gas field in Yamalo-Nenets Autonomous Okrug, Russia

Medvezhye
- Country: Russia
- Region: Yamalo-Nenets Autonomous Okrug
- Offshore/onshore: onshore
- Operator: Gazprom

Field history
- Discovery: 1967
- Start of production: 1972

Production
- Current production of gas: 140×10^{6} m^{3}/d 4.89×10^{9} cu ft/d
- Estimated gas in place: 2.37×10^{12} m^{3} 83×10^{12} cu ft

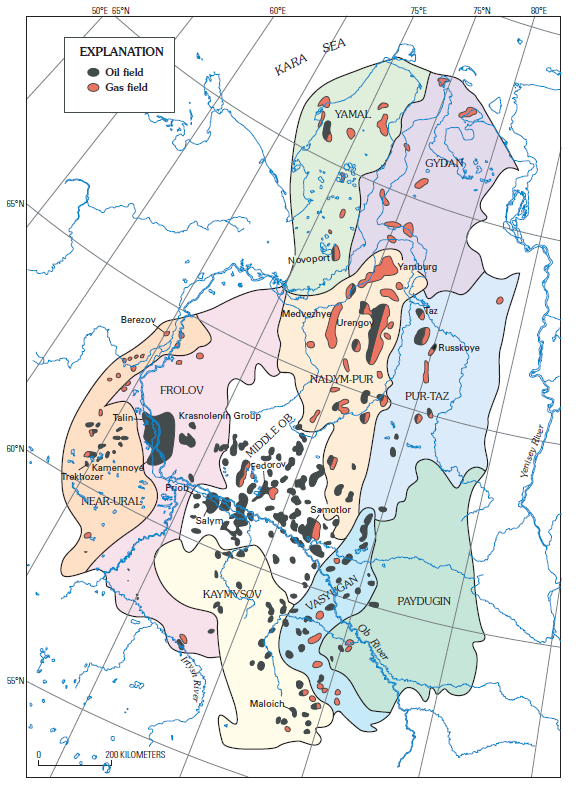
West Siberian petroleum basin oil and gas fields

The Medvezhye gas field is a natural gas field located in Yamalo-Nenets Autonomous Okrug, Russia. Discovered in 1967, it was developed by Gazprom, beginning production of natural gas and condensates in 1972. By 2013, the total proven reserves of the Medvezhye gas field were around 83 trillion ft^{3} (2370 km^{3}), with a production rate of around 4.89 billion ft^{3}/day (140×10^{5} m^{3}).
