= West Siberian petroleum basin =

Petroleum and natural gas basin in Russia

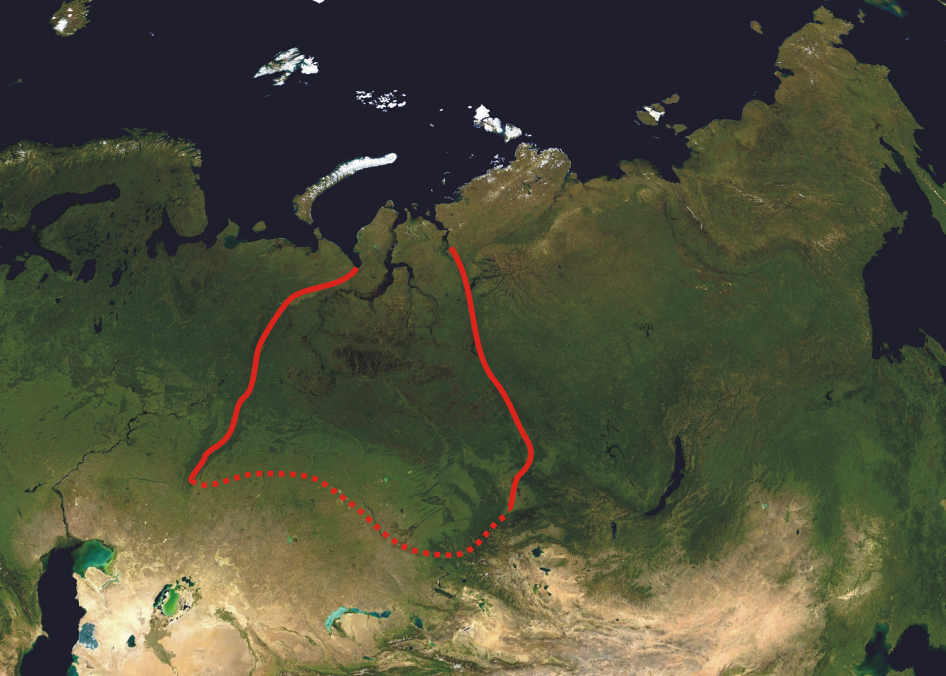
Western Siberian plain on a satellite map of North Asia.

The West Siberian petroleum basin (also known as the West Siberian hydrocarbon province or Western Siberian oil basin) is the largest hydrocarbon (petroleum and natural gas) basin in the world covering an area of about 2.2 million km^{2}, and is also the largest oil and gas producing region in Russia.

Geographically it corresponds to the West Siberian Plain in North Asia. From continental West Siberia, it extends into the Kara Sea as the East-Prinovozemelsky field.

Beneath lie remnants of the Siberian Traps, thought to be responsible for the Great Dying 250 million years ago.

== History ==
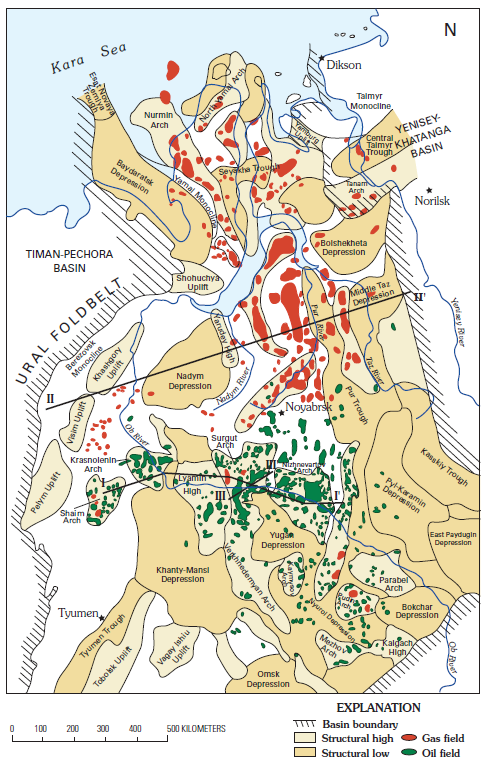
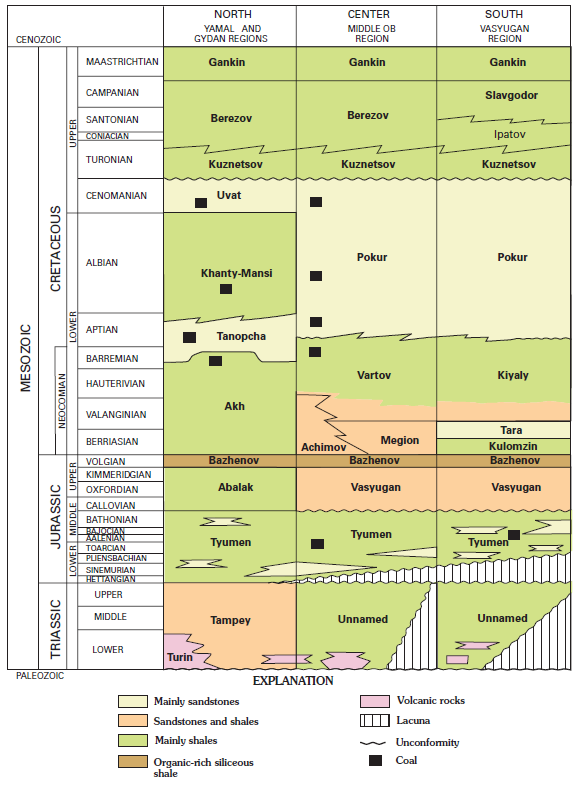
West Siberia structural map (left) and stratigraphic column (right)

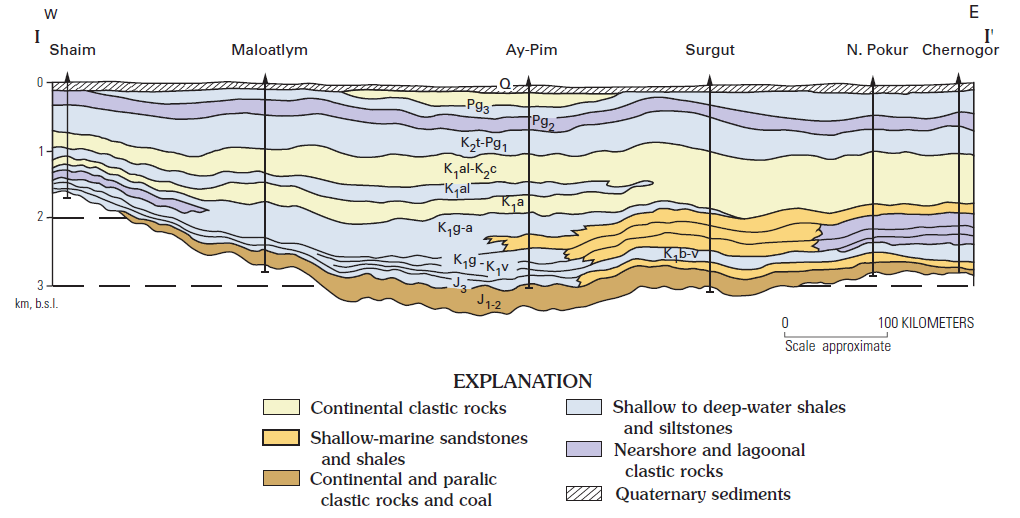
Southern part of West Siberia cross section

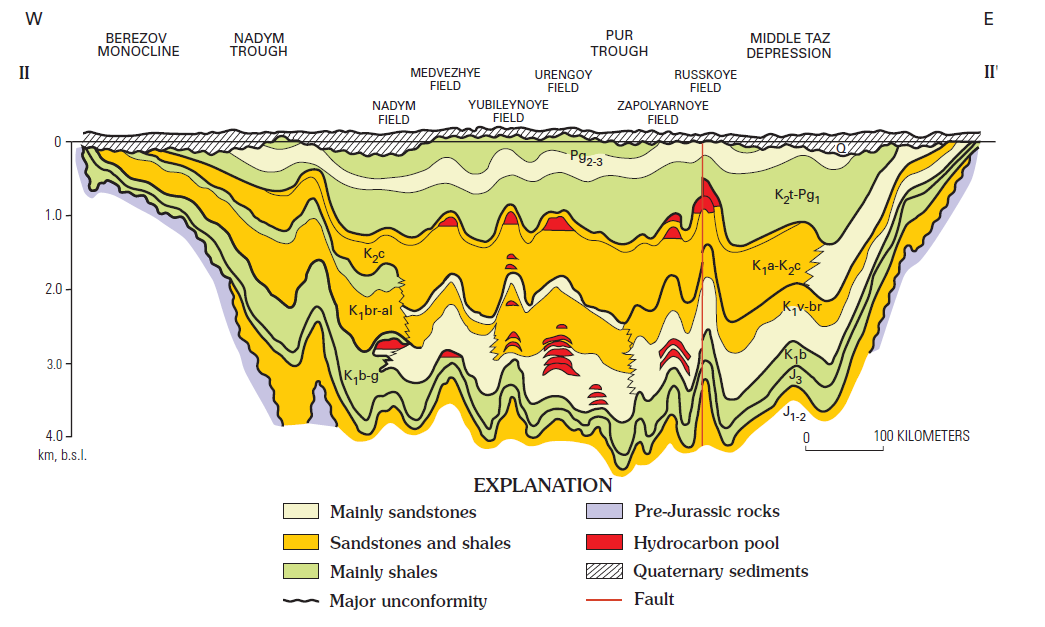
Northern part of West Siberia cross section

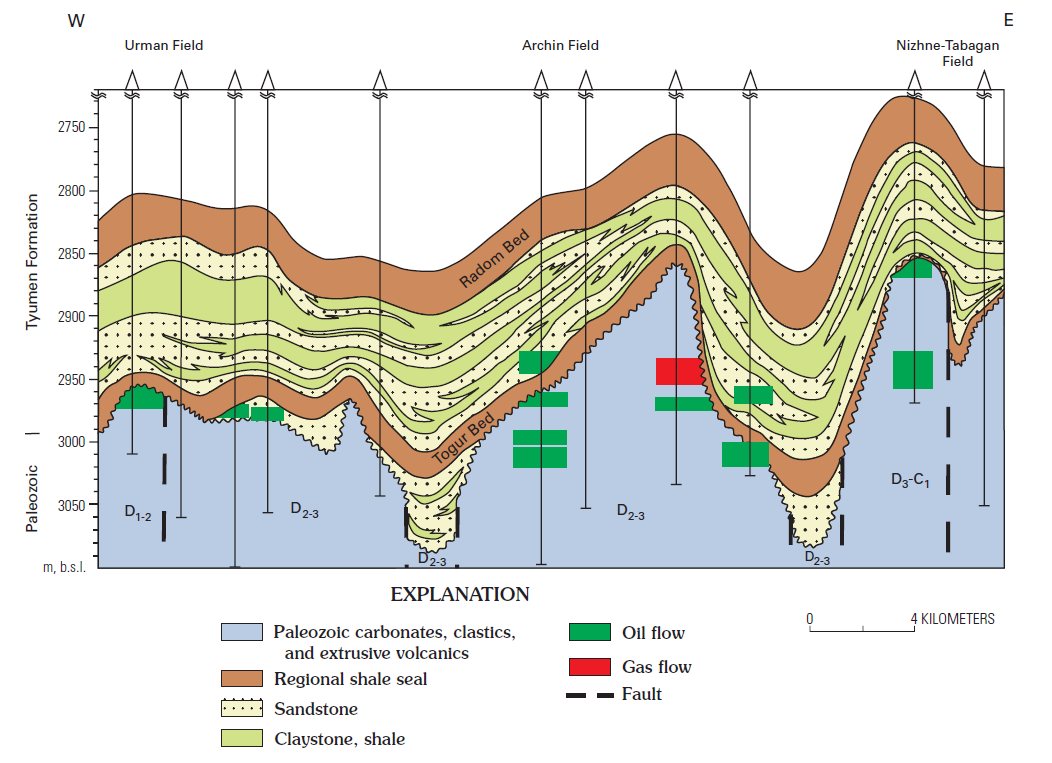
Southeastern part of West Siberia cross section

Gas was discovered in 1953 in Upper Jurassic sandstones and limestones, within the Berezov Field. Then in 1960, oil was discovered in the Upper Jurassic 400 km south, in the Trekhozer Field. A Neocomian oil discovery followed in 1961, in the Middle Ob Region, followed by several giant and large fields, including the Samotlor Field. Gas was discovered in Cenomanian sandstones in 1962 within the Taz Field. This was followed by several giant and large dry gas fields in the Aptian-Cenomanian Pokur Formation, including the Medvezhye Field and Urengoy Field, which commenced production in 1972 and 1978 respectively. Lower-Middle Jurassic discoveries were made in the Tyumen Formation in the 1970s, within the Krasnolenin Arch, including the Tallinn Field in 1976. The giant Rusanovskoye Field and Leningrad Field were discovered in the south Kara Sea in 1989-90.

Since the early 2010s Russia's state-owned energy company Gazprom has been developing Yamal project in the Yamal Peninsula area. As of 2020, Yamal produces over 20% of Russia's gas, which is expected to increase to 40% by 2030. The shortest pipeline routes from Yamal to the northern EU countries are the Yamal–Europe pipeline through Poland and Nord Stream 1 to Germany. The proposed gas route from Western Siberia to China is known as Power of Siberia 2 pipeline.

== Description ==
=== Geography ===
The basin occupies a swampy plain between the Ural Mountains and the Yenisey River. On the north, the basin extends offshore into the southern Kara Sea. On the west, north, and east, the basin is surrounded by the Ural, Yenisey Ridge, and Turukhan- Igarka foldbelts that experienced major deformations during the Hercynian tectonic event and the Novaya Zemlya foldbelt that was deformed in early Cimmerian (Triassic) time. On the south, the folded Caledonian structures of the Central Kazakhstan and Altay-Sayan regions dip northward beneath the basin’s sedimentary cover.

=== Geology ===
The basin is a relatively undeformed Mesozoic sag that overlies the Hercynian accreted terrane and the Early Triassic rift system. The basement is composed of foldbelts that were deformed in Late Carboniferous–Permian time during collision of the Siberian and Kazakhstan continents with the Russian craton. The basement also includes several microcontinental blocks with a relatively undeformed Paleozoic sedimentary sequence.

The sedimentary succession of the basin is composed of Middle Triassic through Tertiary clastic rocks. The lower part of this succession is present only in the northern part of the basin; southward, progressively younger strata onlap the basement, so that in the southern areas the basement is overlain by Toarcian and younger rocks. The important stage in tectono-stratigraphic development of the basin was formation of a deep-water sea in Volgian–early Berriasian time. The sea covered more than one million km 2 in the central basin area. Highly organic-rich siliceous shales of the Bazhenov Formation were deposited during this time in anoxic conditions on the sea bottom. Rocks of this formation have generated more than 80 percent of West Siberian oil reserves and probably a substantial part of its gas reserves. The deep-water basin was filled by prograding clastic clinoforms during Neocomian time. The clastic material was transported by a system of rivers dominantly from the eastern provenance. Sandstones within the Neocomian clinoforms contain the principal oil reservoirs. The thick continental Aptian– Cenomanian Pokur Formation above the Neocomian sequence contains giant gas reserves in the northern part of the basin.

=== Oil and gas reserves ===
The Western Siberian oil basin is the largest oil and gas producing region in Russia. The oil extracted in this territory accounts 70% of the oil produced in the country.

Three total petroleum systems are identified in the West Siberian basin. Volumes of discovered hydrocarbons in these systems are 144 billion barrels of oil and more than 1,300 trillion cubic feet of gas. The assessed mean undiscovered resources are 55.2 billion barrels of oil, 642.9 trillion cubic feet of gas, and 20.5 billion barrels of natural gas liquids.

The largest known oil reserves are in the Bazhenov-Neocomian Total Petroleum System that includes Upper Jurassic and younger rocks of the central and southern parts of the basin. Oil reservoirs are mainly in Neocomian and Upper Jurassic clastic strata. Source rocks are organic-rich siliceous shales of the Bazhenov Formation. Most discovered reserves are in structural traps, but stratigraphic traps in the Neocomian clinoform sequence are productive and are expected to contain much of the undiscovered resources. Two assessment units are identified in this total petroleum system. The first assessment unit includes all conventional reservoirs in the stratigraphic interval from the Upper Jurassic to the Cenomanian. The second unit includes unconventional (or continuous), self-sourced, fractured reservoirs in the Bazhenov Formation. This unit was not assessed quantitatively.

The Togur-Tyumen Total Petroleum System covers the same geographic area as the Bazhenov-Neocomian system, but it includes older, Lower–Middle Jurassic strata and weathered rocks at the top of the pre-Jurassic sequence. A Callovian regional shale seal of the Abalak and lower Vasyugan Formations separates the two systems. The Togur-Tyumen system is oil-prone; gas reserves are insignificant. The principal oil reserves are in sandstone reservoirs at the top and bottom of the Lower–Middle Jurassic Tyumen Formation; comparatively small reserves are in pre-Jurassic carbonate and clastic rocks. The principal source rocks are lacustrine to marine shales of the Toarcian Togur Bed. Traps are structural, stratigraphic, or a combination of the two. The total petroleum system was assessed as a single assessment unit. Most of the undiscovered resources are expected in stratigraphic and combination traps.

The northern onshore and offshore parts of the basin are included in the Northern West Siberian Mesozoic Composite Total Petroleum System that encompasses the entire sedimentary cover. The system is strongly gas-prone; it contains giant gas reserves and comparatively small oil reserves. The major part of hydrocarbon reserves is dry gas in the upper Aptian–Cenomanian sandstones (Pokur Formation and equivalents). Smaller reserves of wet gas and some oil are in Jurassic and Neocomian sandstones. Source rocks for the dry gas in the Pokur Formation that constitutes more than 80 percent of the hydrocarbon reserves are unknown. Wet Neocomian gas and oil were generated from Jurassic source rocks, including the Bazhenov Formation.

Almost all discovered reserves are in structural traps; however, stratigraphic traps in the Neocomian interval probably contain large undiscovered gas resources. The onshore and offshore parts of the total petroleum system were assessed as separate units because of different exploration maturity and different infrastructure requirements. The onshore area is substantially explored, especially in the shallow Aptian–Cenomanian sequence, whereas only three exploratory wells have been drilled offshore. Undiscovered gas potential of both assessment units is very high.

== See also ==
- Kara Sea – Marginal sea of the Arctic Ocean
- Priobskoye field
- Salym Petroleum Development
- Samotlor Field – Russian oilfield
- Tunguska Basin – Sedimentary basin in Siberia
- Yamburg gas field – Gas field in Yamalo-Nenets Autonomous Okrug, Tyumen Oblast, Russia
- Petroleum industry in Russia – One of the largest in the world
