= RVN =

RVN can stand for:

- CBN (Australian TV station), which had this callsign for its Riverina station until 1991
- Registered Veterinary Nurse in the UK
- Republic of Vietnam, a former state in southern Vietnam
- Rovaniemi Airport, in Finland
- Ruud van Nistelrooy, a Dutch footballer
- Ravensthorpe railway station, a British railway station with station code RVN
