= Oksana Antonenko =

British academic

Oksana Antonenko is an associate professor at the Florence School of Transnational Governance at the European University Institute. Her work covers geopolitical risk, foresight and resilience. Oksana worked on European security policy, post-communist transition, crisis-management and East-West relations at the International Institute for Strategic Studies, European Bank for Reconstruction and Development and Control Risks.

== Overview ==
Antonenko holds degrees from Moscow State University in Political Economy and Harvard University’s Kennedy School of Government (USA) MPP in International Affairs and Security. She has authored several articles on Russian and CIS subjects for the IISS research program, and published articles in publications such as Survival academic journal, Strategic Comments, International Herald Tribune, New York Times and Russia Profile.

== Selected publications ==
- Russia and the European Union: Prospects for a New Relationship. Oksana Antonenko and Kathryn Pinnick (editors). Routledge 2005
- A War with No Winners. Survival Vol 5, October–November 2008
- "Russia’s Military Co-operation with Middle Eastern and Arab states" in Armed Forces in the Middle East. Barry Rubin and Thomas Keaney (editors) Frank Cass 2002
