= Slavkovce =

Slavkovce is a Slavic toponym. It may refer to:

- Slavkovce, Slovakia
- Slavkovce, Kosovo
