= Oreské =

Oreské may refer to several villages in Slovakia:

- Oreské, Skalica District
- Oreské, Michalovce District
