= Hegyi =

Hegyi ("of (the) hill") is a Hungarian surname:

- Barnabás Hegyi (1914–1966), Hungarian cinematographer
- Julius Hegyi (1923–2007), American conductor and violinist
- Gyula Hegyi (born 1951), Hungarian politician
- Lóránd Hegyi (born 1954), Hungarian-Austrian art historian
- Ádám Hegyi (born 1986), Hungarian ice hockey player
- Zomilla Hegyi (born 1989), Hungarian-Spanish sprint canoer

== See also ==
- Hegyi is the Hungarian name of Zemplínske Kopčany
