= Čierne Pole =

Village and municipality in Slovakia

Čierne Pole Feketemező
- Municipality
- Flag

- Location of Čierne Pole in the Košice Region Location of Čierne Pole in Slovakia
- Coordinates: 48.57°N 22.08°E
- Country: Slovakia
- Region: Košice Region
- District: Michalovce District
- First mentioned: 1700

Area
  - Total: 4.23 km^{2} (1.63 sq mi)
- Elevation: 105 m (344 ft)

Population (2025)
  - Total: 300
- Time zone: UTC+1 (CET)
  - Summer (DST): UTC+2 (CEST)
- Postal code: 790 1
- Area code: +421 56
- Vehicle registration plate (until 2022): MI
- Website: www.ciernepole.sk

Čierne Pole (Slovak pronunciation: [ˈtʂɪerne ˈpɔle]; Hungarian: Feketemező) is a small village and municipality in Michalovce District in the Kosice Region of eastern Slovakia.

== History ==
In historical records the village was first mentioned in 1422. Before the establishment of independent Czechoslovakia in 1918, it was part of Ung County within the Kingdom of Hungary.

== Geography ==
The municipality lies at an altitude of 105 metres (344 ft) and covers an area of 4.23 km^{2} (1.63 sq mi) (2025).

== Population ==
Population statistic (10 years)
| Year | 1995 | 2005 | 2015 | 2025 |
|---|---|---|---|---|
| Count | 291 | 296 | 283 | 300 |
| Difference | | +1.71% | −4.39% | +6.00% |

Population statistic
| Year | 2024 | 2025 |
|---|---|---|
| Count | 307 | 300 |
| Difference | | −2.28% |

It has a population of 300 people (31 December 2025).

=== Ethnicity ===
Census 2021 (1+ %)
| Ethnicity | Number | Fraction |
|---|---|---|
| Slovak | 301 | 89.58% |
| Hungarian | 31 | 9.22% |
| Ukrainian | 5 | 1.48% |
| Total | 336 | |

In year 2021 was 336 people by ethnicity 301 as Slovak, 31 as Hungarian, 5 as Ukrainian, 3 as Not found out, 2 as German, 1 as Romani and 1 as Other.

Note on population: The difference values of population numbers in the table "Population statistic" and in the sections "Ethnicity" & "Religion" is caused by the use of various statistical methods.

=== Religion ===
Census 2021 (1+ %)
| Religion | Number | Fraction |
|---|---|---|
| Roman Catholic Church | 190 | 56.55% |
| Greek Catholic Church | 90 | 26.79% |
| None | 33 | 9.82% |
| Calvinist Church | 9 | 2.68% |
| Eastern Orthodox Church | 5 | 1.49% |
| Evangelical Church | 4 | 1.19% |
| Total | 336 | |

In year 2021 was 336 people by religion 190 from Roman Catholic Church, 90 from Greek Catholic Church, 33 from None, 9 from Calvinist Church, 5 from Eastern Orthodox Church, 4 from Evangelical Church, 3 from Not found out, 1 from Christian Congregations in Slovakia and 1 from Hinduism.

== Genealogical resources ==
The records for genealogical research are available at the state archive "Statny Archiv in Presov, Slovakia"

- Roman Catholic church records (births/marriages/deaths): 1818-1897 (parish B)

== See also ==
- List of municipalities and towns in Michalovce District
- List of municipalities and towns in Slovakia
