= Vrbnica, Slovakia =

Village and municipality in Slovakia

Vrbnica Füzesér
- Municipality
- Flag

- Location of Vrbnica in the Košice Region Location of Vrbnica in Slovakia
- Coordinates: 48.68°N 21.88°E
- Country: Slovakia
- Region: Košice Region
- District: Michalovce District
- First mentioned: 1330

Area
  - Total: 4.94 km^{2} (1.91 sq mi)
- Elevation: 105 m (344 ft)

Population (2025)
  - Total: 1,349
- Time zone: UTC+1 (CET)
  - Summer (DST): UTC+2 (CEST)
- Postal code: 721 6
- Area code: +421 56
- Vehicle registration plate (until 2022): MI
- Website: obecvrbnica.sk

Vrbnica (Hungarian: Füzesér) is a village and municipality in Michalovce District in the Kosice Region of eastern Slovakia.

== History ==
In historical records the village was first mentioned in 1330.

== Geography ==
The municipality lies at an altitude of 105 metres (344 ft) and covers an area of 4.94 km^{2} (1.91 sq mi) (2025).

== Population ==
Population statistic (10 years)
Year	1995	2005	2015	2025
Count	591	840	1055	1349
Difference		+42.13%	+25.59%	+27.86%

Population statistic
Year	2024	2025
Count	1321	1349
Difference		+2.11%

It has a population of 1349 people (31 December 2025).

=== Ethnicity ===
Census 2021 (1+ %)
Ethnicity	Number	Fraction
Slovak	1150	96.31%
Romani	761	63.73%
Not found out	47	3.93%
Total	1194	

In year 2021 was 1194 people by ethnicity 1150 as Slovak, 761 as Romani, 47 as Not found out, 4 as Czech, 2 as Hungarian, 1 as Rusyn and 1 as Russian.

Note on population: The difference values of population numbers in the table "Population statistic" and in the sections "Ethnicity" & "Religion" is caused by the use of various statistical methods.

=== Religion ===
Census 2021 (1+ %)
Religion	Number	Fraction
Eastern Orthodox Church	699	58.54%
Roman Catholic Church	220	18.43%
None	95	7.96%
Greek Catholic Church	71	5.95%
Not found out	47	3.94%
Other and not ascertained christian church	20	1.68%
Evangelical Church	14	1.17%
Total	1194	

In year 2021 was 1194 people by religion 699 from Eastern Orthodox Church, 220 from Roman Catholic Church, 95 from None, 71 from Greek Catholic Church, 47 from Not found out, 20 from Other and not ascertained christian church, 14 from Evangelical Church, 8 from Jehovah's Witnesses, 8 from Christian Congregations in Slovakia, 6 from Other, 5 from Apostolic Church and 1 from Calvinist Church.

== Culture ==
The village has a small public library, and a football pitch.

== Economy ==
The village has a food store, and a small doctors surgery.

The nearest railway station is 2 kilometres away at Hatalov.
