= Malčice =

Village and municipality in Slovakia

Malčice Málca
- Municipality
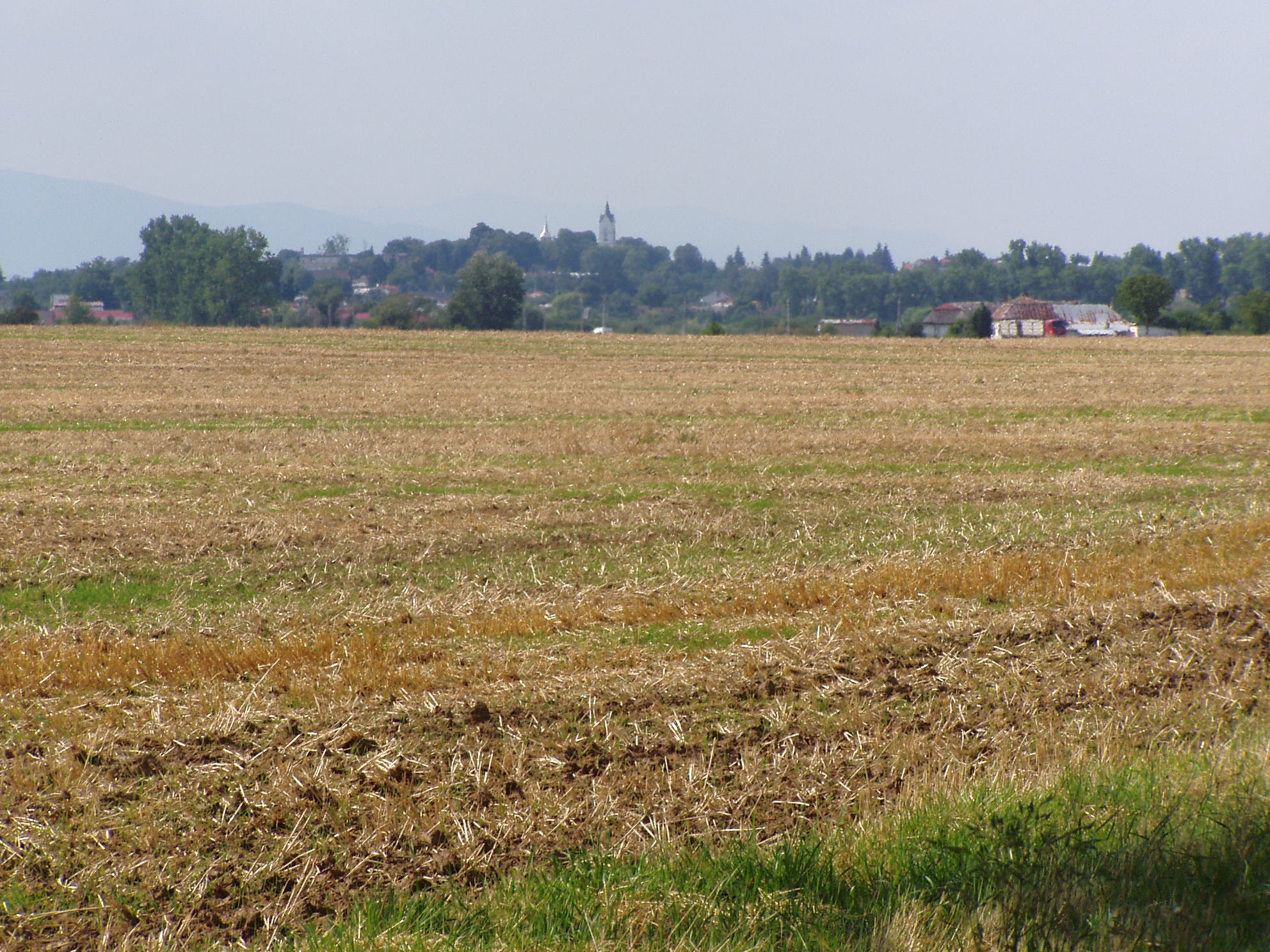

- Flag

- Location of Malčice in the Košice Region Location of Malčice in Slovakia
- Coordinates: 48.58°N 21.85°E
- Country: Slovakia
- Region: Košice Region
- District: Michalovce District
- First mentioned: 1274

Area
  - Total: 22.66 km^{2} (8.75 sq mi)
- Elevation: 103 m (338 ft)

Population (2025)
  - Total: 1,525
- Time zone: UTC+1 (CET)
  - Summer (DST): UTC+2 (CEST)
- Postal code: 720 6
- Area code: +421 56
- Vehicle registration plate (until 2022): MI
- Website: www.obecmalcice.sk

Malčice (Hungarian: Málca) is a village and municipality in Michalovce District in the Kosice Region of eastern Slovakia.

== History ==
In historical records the village was first mentioned in 1274 .

== Geography ==
The municipality lies at an altitude of 103 metres (338 ft) and covers an area of 22.66 km^{2} (8.75 sq mi) (2025).

== Population ==
Population statistic (10 years)
Year	1995	2005	2015	2025
Count	1233	1353	1490	1525
Difference		+9.73%	+10.12%	+2.34%

Population statistic
Year	2024	2025
Count	1485	1525
Difference		+2.69%

It has a population of 1525 people (31 December 2025).

=== Ethnicity ===
Census 2021 (1+ %)
Ethnicity	Number	Fraction
Slovak	1340	90.41%
Romani	185	12.48%
Not found out	131	8.83%
Total	1482	

In year 2021 was 1482 people by ethnicity 1340 as Slovak, 185 as Romani, 131 as Not found out, 11 as Czech, 5 as Rusyn, 4 as Ukrainian, 4 as Russian, 3 as Other, 1 as Serbian, 1 as Polish, 1 as German and 1 as English.

Note on population: The difference values of population numbers in the table "Population statistic" and in the sections "Ethnicity" & "Religion" is caused by the use of various statistical methods.

=== Religion ===
Census 2021 (1+ %)
Religion	Number	Fraction
Roman Catholic Church	990	66.8%
None	188	12.69%
Not found out	108	7.29%
Eastern Orthodox Church	58	3.91%
Greek Catholic Church	55	3.71%
Calvinist Church	34	2.29%
Apostolic Church	18	1.21%
Total	1482	

In year 2021 was 1482 people by religion 990 from Roman Catholic Church, 188 from None, 108 from Not found out, 58 from Eastern Orthodox Church, 55 from Greek Catholic Church, 34 from Calvinist Church, 18 from Apostolic Church, 14 from United Methodist Church, 11 from Evangelical Church, 2 from Christian Congregations in Slovakia, 1 from Other and not ascertained christian church, 1 from Jehovah's Witnesses, 1 from Church of the Brethren and 1 from Ad hoc movements.

== Culture ==
The village has a public library and a football pitch.

== See also ==
- List of municipalities and towns in Michalovce District
- List of municipalities and towns in Slovakia
