= Budince =

Village and municipality in Michalovce District in Slovakia

Budince Budaháza
- Municipality
- Flag

- Location of Budince in the Košice Region Location of Budince in Slovakia
- Coordinates: 48.53°N 22.15°E
- Country: Slovakia
- Region: Košice Region
- District: Michalovce District
- First mentioned: 1332

Area
  - Total: 1.96 km^{2} (0.76 sq mi)
- Elevation: 104 m (341 ft)

Population (2025)
  - Total: 238
- Time zone: UTC+1 (CET)
  - Summer (DST): UTC+2 (CEST)
- Postal code: 761 7
- Area code: +421 56
- Vehicle registration plate (until 2022): MI

Budince (Hungarian: Budaháza) is a village and municipality in Michalovce District in the Kosice Region of eastern Slovakia.

== History ==
In historical records the village was first mentioned in 1332. Before the establishment of independent Czechoslovakia in 1918, it was part of Ung County within the Kingdom of Hungary.

== Geography ==
The municipality lies at an altitude of 104 metres (341 ft) and covers an area of 1.96 km^{2} (0.76 sq mi) (2025).

== Population ==
Population statistic (10 years)
Year	1995	2005	2015	2025
Count	185	208	211	238
Difference		+12.43%	+1.44%	+12.79%

Population statistic
Year	2024	2025
Count	233	238
Difference		+2.14%

It has a population of 238 people (31 December 2025).

=== Ethnicity ===
Census 2021 (1+ %)
Ethnicity	Number	Fraction
Hungarian	197	87.16%
Not found out	20	8.84%
Slovak	16	7.07%
Romani	4	1.76%
Total	226	

In year 2021 was 226 people by ethnicity 197 as Hungarian, 20 as Not found out, 16 as Slovak, 4 as Romani and 1 as German.

Note on population: The difference values of population numbers in the table "Population statistic" and in the sections "Ethnicity" & "Religion" is caused by the use of various statistical methods.

=== Religion ===
Census 2021 (1+ %)
Religion	Number	Fraction
Roman Catholic Church	133	58.85%
Evangelical Church	29	12.83%
Calvinist Church	20	8.85%
Greek Catholic Church	17	7.52%
Not found out	15	6.64%
None	10	4.42%
Total	226	

In year 2021 was 226 people by religion 133 from Roman Catholic Church, 29 from Evangelical Church, 20 from Calvinist Church, 17 from Greek Catholic Church, 15 from Not found out, 10 from None, 1 from Christian Congregations in Slovakia and 1 from United Methodist Church.

== Government ==
The village relies on the tax and district offices, police force and fire brigade at Veľké Kapušany

== Genealogical resources ==
The records for genealogical research are available at the state archive "Statny Archiv in Presov, Slovakia"

- Greek Catholic church records (births/marriages/deaths): 1813-1875 (parish B)
- Reformated church records (births/marriages/deaths): 1767-1832 (parish B)

== See also ==
- List of municipalities and towns in Slovakia
