= Michalovce District =

Coordinates: 48°45′22″N 21°54′53″E

- District
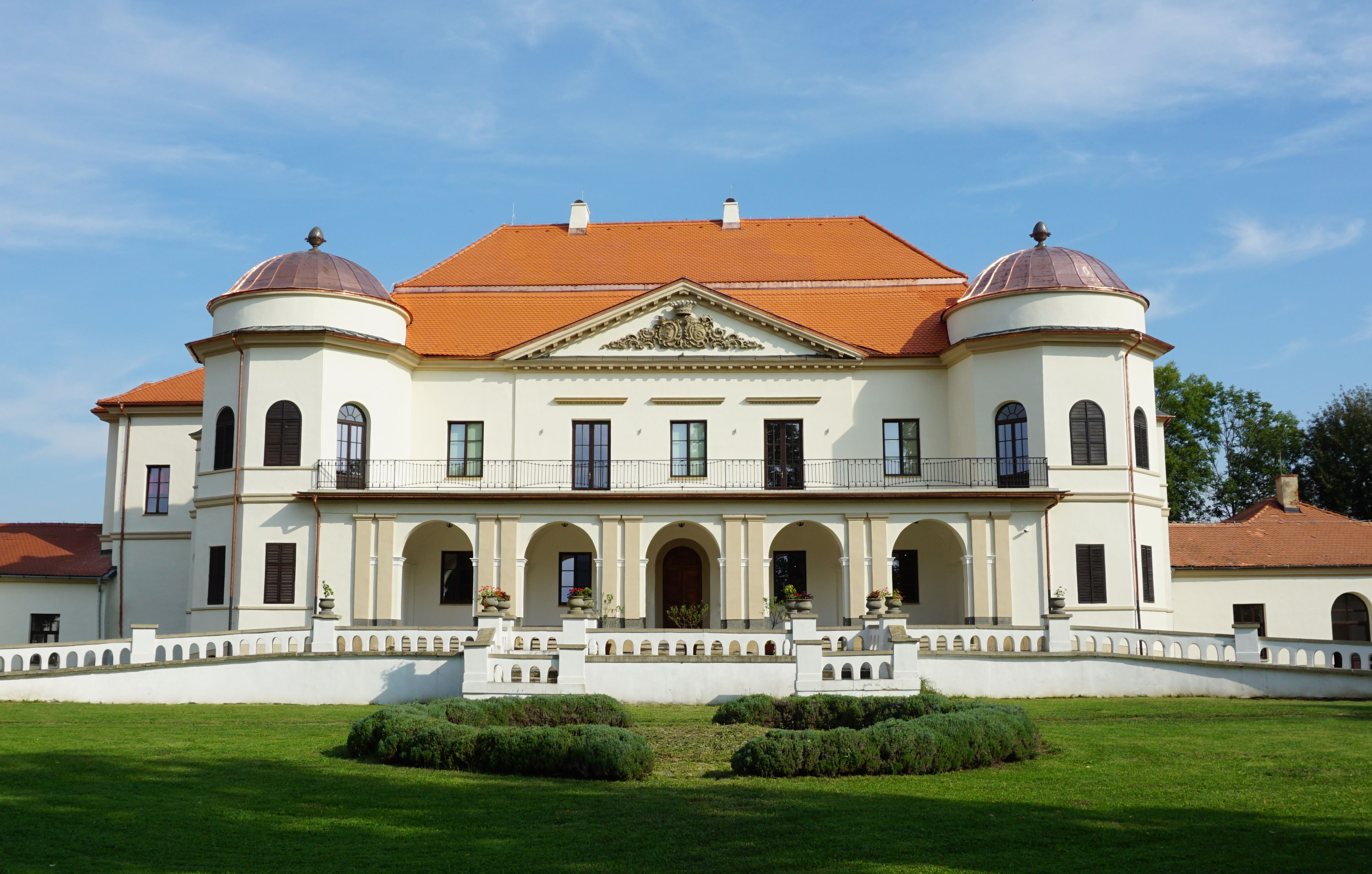
- Country: Slovakia
- Region (kraj): Košice Region
- Seat: Michalovce

Area
  - Total: 1,019.20 km^{2} (393.52 sq mi)

Population (2025)
  - Total: 107,617
- Time zone: UTC+1 (CET)
  - Summer (DST): UTC+2 (CEST)
- Telephone prefix: 056
- Vehicle registration plate (until 2022): MI
- Municipalities: 78

Michalovce District (Slovak: okres Michalovce) is a district in the Košice Region of eastern Slovakia. Until 1918, the district was split between the county of Kingdom of Hungary of Zemplín (in the west) and Uh (in the east).

== Population ==
Historical population
Year	Pop.	±%
1970	90,206	—
1980	100,328	+11.2%
1991	105,281	+4.9%
2001	109,121	+3.6%
2011	110,842	+1.6%
2021	108,954	−1.7%
Source: Censuses

Population statistic (10 years)
Year	1995	2005	2015	2025
Count	107,743	109,547	110,712	107,617
Difference		+1.67%	+1.06%	−2.79%

Population statistic
Year	2024	2025
Count	107,936	107,617
Difference		−0.29%

It has a population of 107,617 people (31 December 2025).

=== Ethnicity ===
Census 2021 (1+ %)
Ethnicity	Number	Fraction
Slovak	88,440	74.8%
Hungarian	12,622	10.67%
Not found out	7437	6.29%
Romani	7057	5.96%
Total	118,233	

In year 2021 was 118,233 people by ethnicity 88,440 as Slovak, 12,622 as Hungarian, 7437 as Not found out, 7057 as Romani, 846 as Rusyn, 581 as Czech, 505 as Ukrainian, 246 as Other, 109 as Russian, 79 as Polish, 61 as German, 61 as English, 35 as Vietnamese, 24 as Bulgarian, 20 as Serbian, 19 as Italian, 18 as Chinese, 17 as Moravian, 11 as Jewish, 9 as Greek, 8 as Albanian, 6 as French, 5 as Romanian, 5 as Croatian, 3 as Irish, 3 as Turkish, 3 as Austrian, 2 as Silesian and 1 as Canadian.

Note on population: The difference values of population numbers in the table "Population statistic" and in the sections "Ethnicity" & "Religion" is caused by the use of various statistical methods.

=== Religion ===
Census 2021 (1+ %)
Religion	Number	Fraction
Roman Catholic Church	46,676	42.84%
Greek Catholic Church	18,662	17.13%
None	13,617	12.5%
Calvinist Church	9485	8.71%
Not found out	8760	8.04%
Eastern Orthodox Church	5948	5.46%
Evangelical Church	2859	2.62%
Jehovah's Witnesses	1340	1.23%
Total	108,954	

In year 2021 was 108,954 people by religion 46,676 from Roman Catholic Church, 18,662 from Greek Catholic Church, 13,617 from None, 9485 from Calvinist Church, 8760 from Not found out, 5948 from Eastern Orthodox Church, 2859 from Evangelical Church, 1340 from Jehovah's Witnesses, 331 from Apostolic Church, 251 from Christian Congregations in Slovakia, 185 from Other, 180 from Other and not ascertained christian church, 148 from United Methodist Church, 141 from Ad hoc movements, 121 from Church of the Brethren, 59 from Buddhism, 41 from Seventh-day Adventist Church, 38 from Islam, 33 from Paganism and natural spirituality, 23 from Old Catholic Church, 22 from Baptists Church, 17 from Jewish community, 6 from Church of Jesus Christ of Latter-day Saints, 4 from Hinduism, 4 from Czechoslovak Hussite Church, 2 from Bahá'i Community and 1 from New Apostolic Church.

== Municipalities ==
Municipality	Area [km^{2}]	Population
Bajany	5.54	435
Bánovce nad Ondavou	12.23	692
Beša	19.53	362
Bracovce	9.61	967
Budince	1.96	238
Budkovce	19.84	1,490
Čečehov	7.61	386
Čičarovce	26.63	925
Čierne Pole	4.23	300
Drahňov	17.55	1,720
Dúbravka	10.21	666
Falkušovce	9.46	665
Hatalov	8.63	730
Hažín	16.31	468
Hnojné	6.81	245
Horovce	13.08	866
Iňačovce	17.34	922
Ižkovce	4.22	94
Jastrabie pri Michalovciach	5.74	280
Jovsa	18.46	850
Kačanov	5.78	557
Kaluža	9.93	490
Kapušianske Kľačany	20.31	977
Klokočov	11.94	462
Krásnovce	4.63	612
Krišovská Liesková	15.58	949
Kusín	9.81	346
Lastomír	13.47	1,237
Laškovce	3.30	774
Lesné	6.81	412
Ložín	8.24	831
Lúčky	7.92	594
Malčice	22.66	1,525
Malé Raškovce	8.75	225
Markovce	8.01	1,093
Maťovské Vojkovce	12.29	694
Michalovce	52.80	34,894
Moravany	16.66	1,055
Nacina Ves	15.80	1,816
Oborín	43.78	685
Oreské	11.12	481
Palín	11.22	867
Pavlovce nad Uhom	33.97	4,678
Petrikovce	5.73	200
Petrovce nad Laborcom	10.21	1,123
Poruba pod Vihorlatom	20.50	590
Pozdišovce	18.04	1,296
Ptrukša	6.93	455
Pusté Čemerné	6.67	371
Rakovec nad Ondavou	15.21	997
Ruská	11.90	613
Senné	18.75	720
Slavkovce	9.18	734
Sliepkovce	6.45	760
Staré	18.02	771
Strážske	24.77	4,169
Stretava	7.09	687
Stretavka	4.86	157
Suché	7.30	428
Šamudovce	4.84	615
Trhovište	12.56	2,209
Trnava pri Laborci	15.93	646
Tušice	6.23	658
Tušická Nová Ves	4.32	510
Veľké Kapušany	29.61	8,285
Veľké Raškovce	11.99	304
Veľké Slemence	9.97	580
Vinné	29.78	2,204
Vojany	10.92	966
Voľa	5.78	273
Vrbnica	4.94	1,349
Vysoká nad Uhom	15.33	726
Zalužice	19.61	1,161
Závadka	5.01	427
Zbudza	9.07	510
Zemplínska Široká	16.25	1,043
Zemplínske Kopčany	9.66	531
Žbince	15.06	994

Population and area values are current for year 2025.
