= Závadka, Michalovce District =

Závadka Fogas
- Municipality
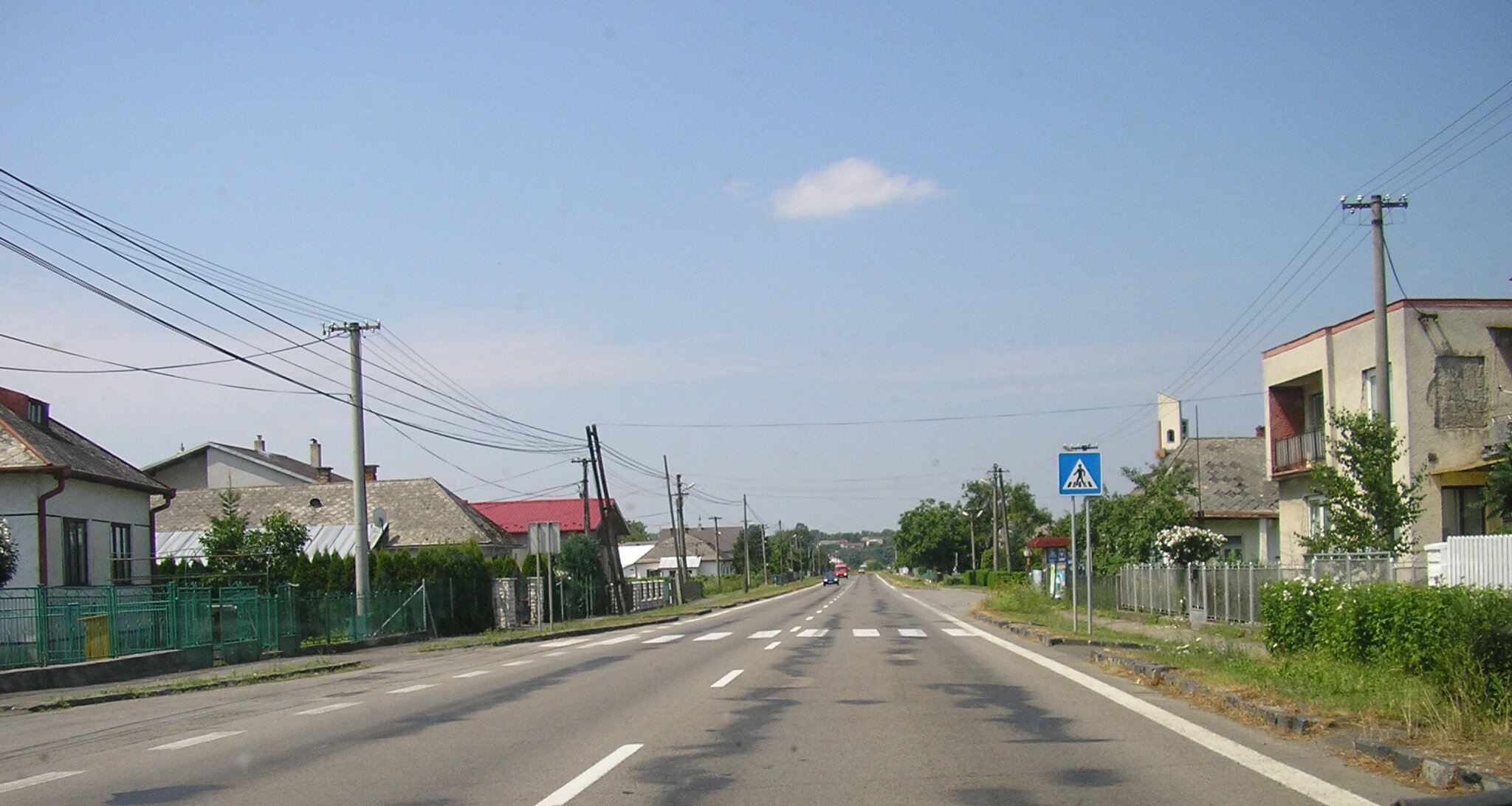

- Flag

- Location of Závadka in the Košice Region Location of Závadka in Slovakia
- Coordinates: 48.77°N 22.07°E
- Country: Slovakia
- Region: Košice Region
- District: Michalovce District
- First mentioned: 1418

Area
  - Total: 5.01 km^{2} (1.93 sq mi)
- Elevation: 108 m (354 ft)

Population (2025)
  - Total: 427
- Time zone: UTC+1 (CET)
  - Summer (DST): UTC+2 (CEST)
- Postal code: 723 3
- Area code: +421 56
- Vehicle registration plate (until 2022): MI
- Website: www.zavadkaprimichalovciach.sk

Závadka (Hungarian: Fogas) is a village and municipality in Michalovce District in the Košice Region of eastern Slovakia.

== History ==
In historical records the village was first mentioned in 1418.

== Geography ==
The municipality lies at an altitude of 108 metres (354 ft) and covers an area of 5.01 km^{2} (1.93 sq mi) (2025).

== Population ==
Population statistic (10 years)
Year	1995	2005	2015	2025
Count	413	437	441	427
Difference		+5.81%	+0.91%	−3.17%

Population statistic
Year	2024	2025
Count	426	427
Difference		+0.23%

It has a population of 427 people (31 December 2025).

=== Ethnicity ===
Census 2021 (1+ %)
Ethnicity	Number	Fraction
Slovak	429	94.07%
Not found out	23	5.04%
Romani	7	1.53%
Rusyn	6	1.31%
Total	456	

In year 2021 was 456 people by ethnicity 429 as Slovak, 23 as Not found out, 7 as Romani, 6 as Rusyn, 2 as English, 1 as Ukrainian and 1 as French.

Note on population: The difference values of population numbers in the table "Population statistic" and in the sections "Ethnicity" & "Religion" is caused by the use of various statistical methods.

=== Religion ===
Census 2021 (1+ %)
Religion	Number	Fraction
Roman Catholic Church	178	39.04%
Greek Catholic Church	78	17.11%
Calvinist Church	59	12.94%
None	56	12.28%
Eastern Orthodox Church	28	6.14%
Not found out	21	4.61%
Jehovah's Witnesses	17	3.73%
Evangelical Church	15	3.29%
Total	456	

In year 2021 was 456 people by religion 178 from Roman Catholic Church, 78 from Greek Catholic Church, 59 from Calvinist Church, 56 from None, 28 from Eastern Orthodox Church, 21 from Not found out, 17 from Jehovah's Witnesses, 15 from Evangelical Church, 1 from Paganism and natural spirituality, 1 from Other and not ascertained christian church, 1 from United Methodist Church and 1 from Buddhism.

== See also ==
- List of municipalities and towns in Michalovce District
- List of municipalities and towns in Slovakia
