= Petrikovce =

Petrikovce Petrik
- Municipality
- Flag

- Location of Petrikovce in the Košice Region Location of Petrikovce in Slovakia
- Coordinates: 48.55°N 21.87°E
- Country: Slovakia
- Region: Košice Region
- District: Michalovce District
- First mentioned: 1411

Area
  - Total: 5.73 km^{2} (2.21 sq mi)
- Elevation: 103 m (338 ft)

Population (2025)
  - Total: 200
- Time zone: UTC+1 (CET)
  - Summer (DST): UTC+2 (CEST)
- Postal code: 720 6
- Area code: +421 56
- Vehicle registration plate (until 2022): MI
- Website: petrikovce.sk

Petrikovce (Hungarian: Petrik) is a village and municipality in Michalovce District in the Kosice Region of eastern Slovakia.

== History ==
In historical records the village was first mentioned in 1411.

== Geography ==
The municipality lies at an altitude of 103 metres (338 ft) and covers an area of 5.73 km^{2} (2.21 sq mi) (2025).

== Population ==
Population statistic (10 years)
Year	1995	2005	2015	2025
Count	202	208	186	200
Difference		+2.97%	−10.57%	+7.52%

Population statistic
Year	2024	2025
Count	202	200
Difference		−0.99%

It has a population of 200 people (31 December 2025).

=== Ethnicity ===
Census 2021 (1+ %)
Ethnicity	Number	Fraction
Slovak	177	92.67%
Not found out	7	3.66%
Romani	6	3.14%
Hungarian	4	2.09%
Czech	3	1.57%
English	2	1.04%
Total	191	

In year 2021 was 191 people by ethnicity 177 as Slovak, 7 as Not found out, 6 as Romani, 4 as Hungarian, 3 as Czech, 2 as English and 1 as Rusyn.

Note on population: The difference values of population numbers in the table "Population statistic" and in the sections "Ethnicity" & "Religion" is caused by the use of various statistical methods.

=== Religion ===
Census 2021 (1+ %)
Religion	Number	Fraction
Roman Catholic Church	87	45.55%
Greek Catholic Church	70	36.65%
None	9	4.71%
Eastern Orthodox Church	7	3.66%
Not found out	7	3.66%
Calvinist Church	4	2.09%
Christian Congregations in Slovakia	4	2.09%
Islam	2	1.05%
Total	191	

In year 2021 was 191 people by religion 87 from Roman Catholic Church, 70 from Greek Catholic Church, 9 from None, 7 from Eastern Orthodox Church, 7 from Not found out, 4 from Calvinist Church, 4 from Christian Congregations in Slovakia, 2 from Islam and 1 from Evangelical Church.
