= Lastomír =

Lastomír Lasztomér
- Municipality
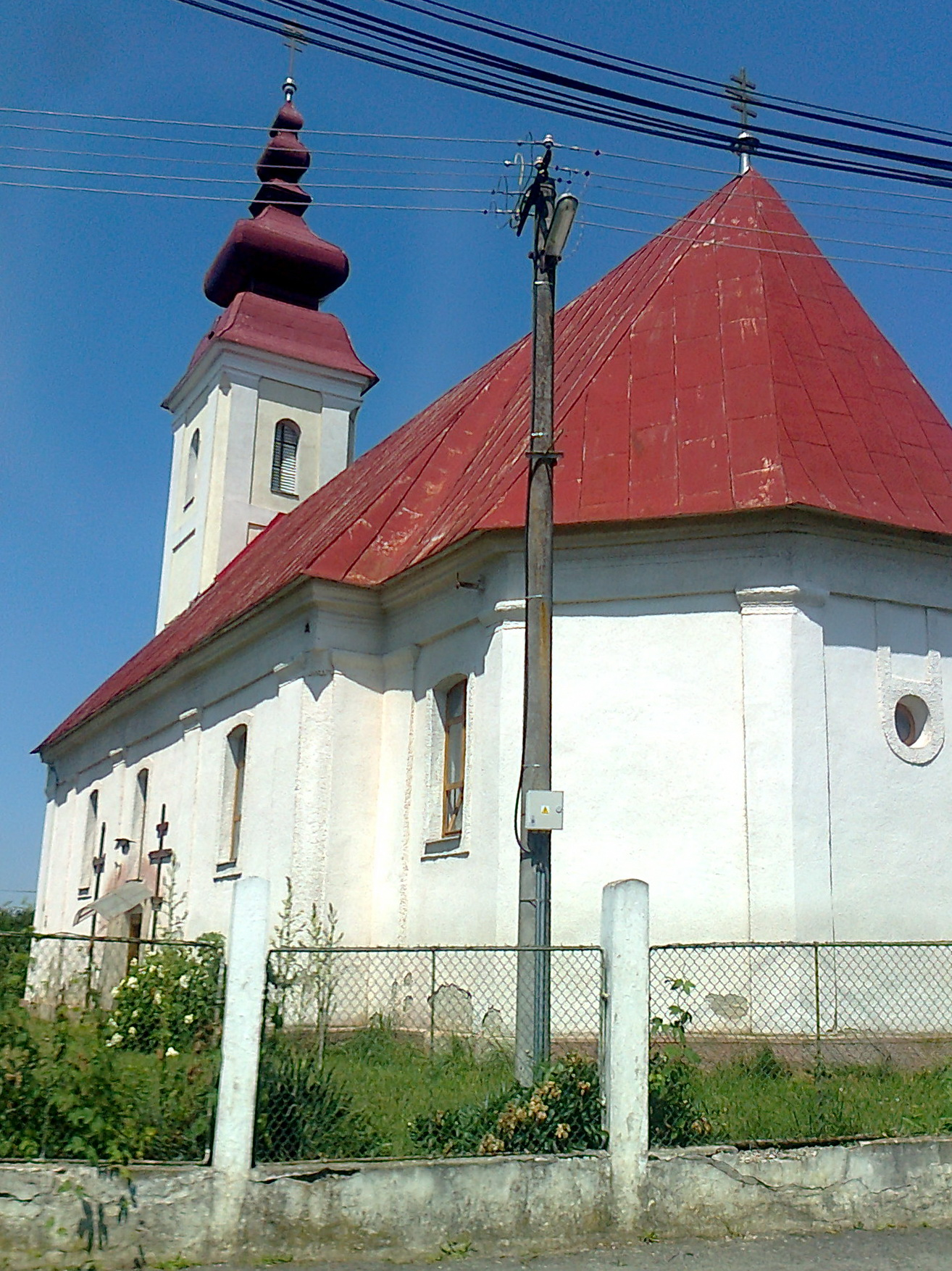
- Lastomír Greek Catholic church

- Flag

- Location of Lastomír in the Košice Region Location of Lastomír in Slovakia
- Coordinates: 48.70°N 21.93°E
- Country: Slovakia
- Region: Košice Region
- District: Michalovce District
- First mentioned: 1288

Area
  - Total: 13.47 km^{2} (5.20 sq mi)
- Elevation: 108 m (354 ft)

Population (2025)
  - Total: 1,237
- Time zone: UTC+1 (CET)
  - Summer (DST): UTC+2 (CEST)
- Postal code: 723 7
- Area code: +421 56
- Vehicle registration plate (until 2022): MI
- Website: www.obeclastomir.sk

Lastomír (Hungarian: Lasztomér) is a village and municipality in Michalovce District in the Kosice Region of eastern Slovakia.

== History ==
In historical records the village was first mentioned in 1288. Before the establishment of independent Czechoslovakia in 1918, Lastomír was part of Zemplén County within the Kingdom of Hungary. From 1939 to 1944, it was part of the Slovak Republic. On 26 November 1944, the Red Army dislodged the Wehrmacht from Lastomír and it was once again part of Czechoslovakia.

== Geography ==
The municipality lies at an altitude of 108 metres (354 ft) and covers an area of 13.47 km^{2} (5.20 sq mi) (2025).

== Population ==
Population statistic (10 years)
Year	1995	2005	2015	2025
Count	1186	1161	1166	1237
Difference		−2.10%	+0.43%	+6.08%

Population statistic
Year	2024	2025
Count	1243	1237
Difference		−0.48%

It has a population of 1237 people (31 December 2025).

=== Ethnicity ===
Census 2021 (1+ %)
Ethnicity	Number	Fraction
Slovak	1215	97.35%
Romani	20	1.6%
Not found out	17	1.36%
Total	1248	

In year 2021 was 1248 people by ethnicity 1215 as Slovak, 20 as Romani, 17 as Not found out, 9 as Czech, 8 as Ukrainian, 6 as Rusyn, 4 as English, 2 as Other, 1 as Russian and 1 as Hungarian.

Note on population: The difference values of population numbers in the table "Population statistic" and in the sections "Ethnicity" & "Religion" is caused by the use of various statistical methods.

=== Religion ===
Census 2021 (1+ %)
Religion	Number	Fraction
Roman Catholic Church	395	31.65%
Eastern Orthodox Church	265	21.23%
Calvinist Church	201	16.11%
Greek Catholic Church	144	11.54%
None	129	10.34%
Evangelical Church	61	4.89%
Jehovah's Witnesses	18	1.44%
Not found out	17	1.36%
Total	1248	

In year 2021 was 1248 people by religion 395 from Roman Catholic Church, 265 from Eastern Orthodox Church, 201 from Calvinist Church, 144 from Greek Catholic Church, 129 from None, 61 from Evangelical Church, 18 from Jehovah's Witnesses, 17 from Not found out, 6 from United Methodist Church, 4 from Old Catholic Church, 2 from Apostolic Church, 2 from Ad hoc movements, 1 from Other and not ascertained christian church, 1 from Other, 1 from Seventh-day Adventist Church and 1 from Bahá'i Community.
