= Pusté Čemerné =

Pusté Čemerné Márkcsemernye
- Municipality
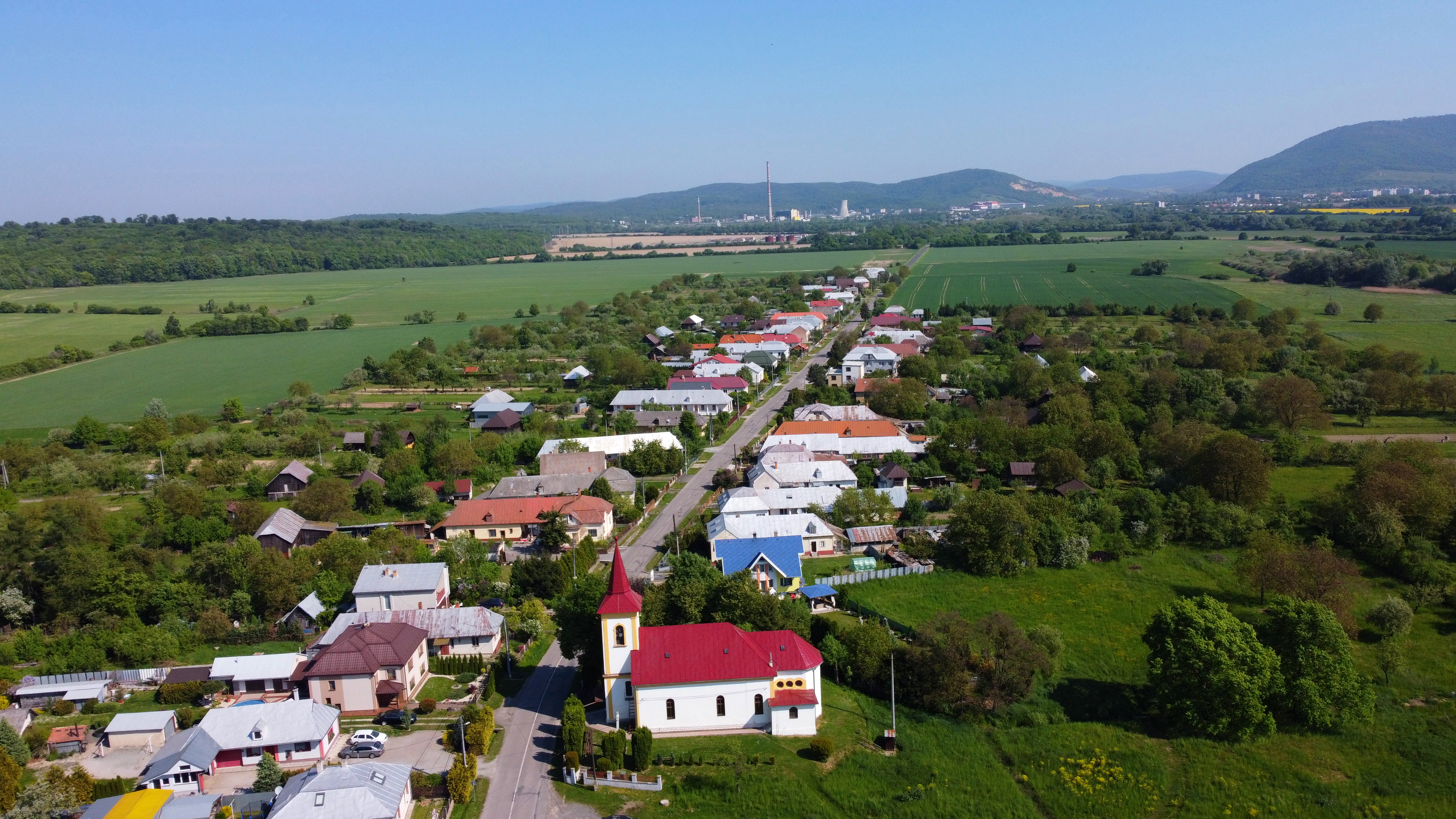

- Flag

- Location of Pusté Čemerné in the Košice Region Location of Pusté Čemerné in Slovakia
- Coordinates: 48.85°N 21.82°E
- Country: Slovakia
- Region: Košice Region
- District: Michalovce District
- First mentioned: 1254

Area
  - Total: 6.67 km^{2} (2.58 sq mi)
- Elevation: 134 m (440 ft)

Population (2025)
  - Total: 371
- Time zone: UTC+1 (CET)
  - Summer (DST): UTC+2 (CEST)
- Postal code: 722 2
- Area code: +421 56
- Vehicle registration plate (until 2022): MI
- Website: www.pustecemerne.sk

Pusté Čemerné (Hungarian: Márkcsemernye) is a village and municipality in Michalovce District in the Kosice Region of eastern Slovakia.

== History ==
In historical records the village was first mentioned in 1254.

== Geography ==
The municipality lies at an altitude of 134 metres (440 ft) and covers an area of 6.67 km^{2} (2.58 sq mi) (2025).

== Population ==
Population statistic (10 years)
Year	1995	2005	2015	2025
Count	377	362	358	371
Difference		−3.97%	−1.10%	+3.63%

Population statistic
Year	2024	2025
Count	374	371
Difference		−0.80%

It has a population of 371 people (31 December 2025).

=== Ethnicity ===
Census 2021 (1+ %)
Ethnicity	Number	Fraction
Slovak	354	96.72%
Not found out	13	3.55%
Rusyn	4	1.09%
Total	366	

In year 2021 was 366 people by ethnicity 354 as Slovak, 13 as Not found out and 4 as Rusyn.

Note on population: The difference values of population numbers in the table "Population statistic" and in the sections "Ethnicity" & "Religion" is caused by the use of various statistical methods.

=== Religion ===
Census 2021 (1+ %)
Religion	Number	Fraction
Roman Catholic Church	182	49.73%
Greek Catholic Church	134	36.61%
None	24	6.56%
Not found out	14	3.83%
Jehovah's Witnesses	5	1.37%
Eastern Orthodox Church	4	1.09%
Total	366	

In year 2021 was 366 people by religion 182 from Roman Catholic Church, 134 from Greek Catholic Church, 24 from None, 14 from Not found out, 5 from Jehovah's Witnesses, 4 from Eastern Orthodox Church, 1 from Calvinist Church, 1 from Islam and 1 from Evangelical Church.
