= Oborín =

Village and municipality in Slovakia

Oborín Abara
- Municipality
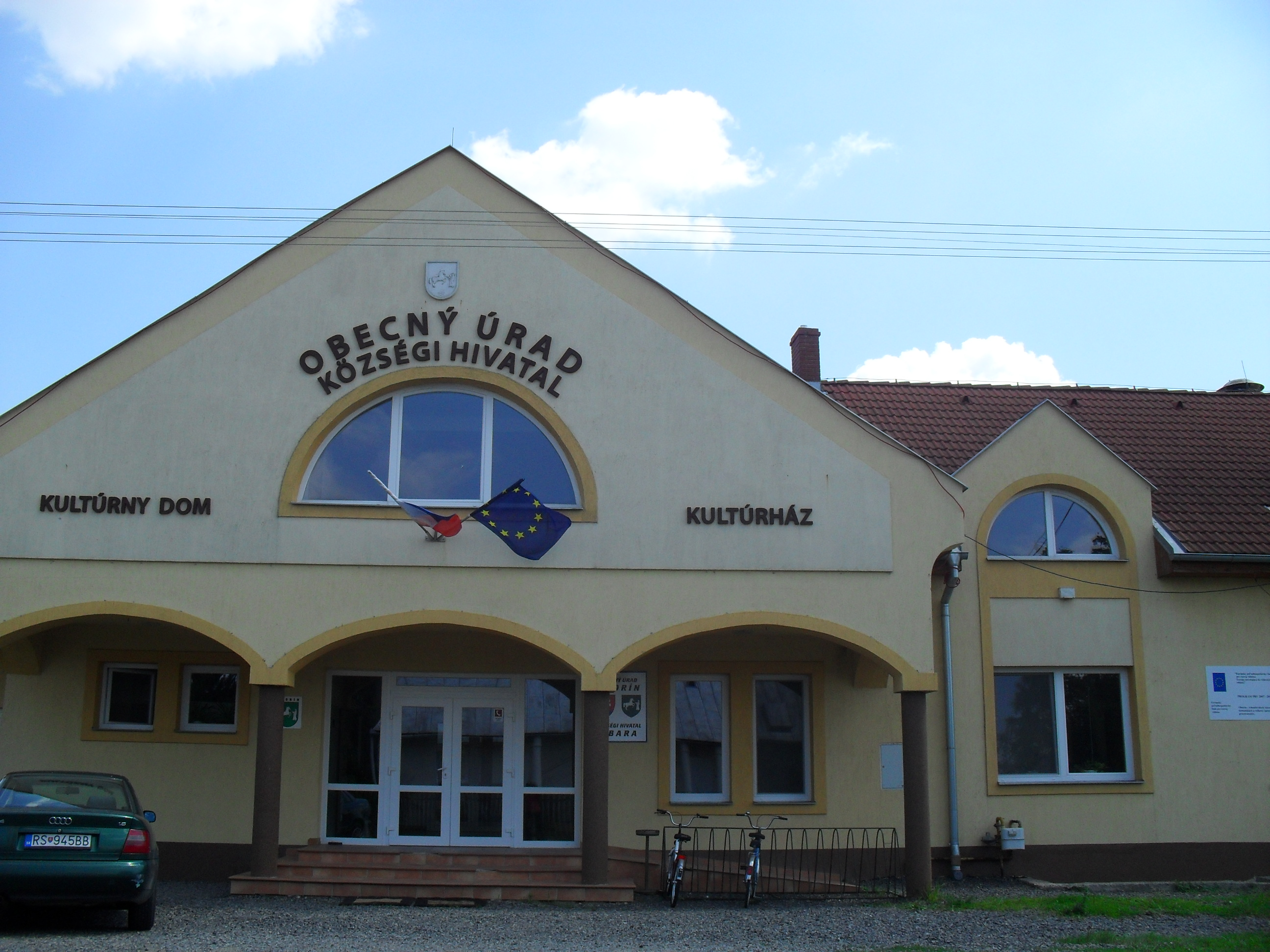

- Flag

- Location of Oborín in the Košice Region Location of Oborín in Slovakia
- Coordinates: 48.55°N 21.88°E
- Country: Slovakia
- Region: Košice Region
- District: Michalovce District
- First mentioned: 1221

Area
  - Total: 43.78 km^{2} (16.90 sq mi)
- Elevation: 104 m (341 ft)

Population (2025)
  - Total: 685
- Time zone: UTC+1 (CET)
  - Summer (DST): UTC+2 (CEST)
- Postal code: 767 5
- Area code: +421 56
- Vehicle registration plate (until 2022): MI
- Website: www.oborin.sk

Oborín (Hungarian: Abara) is a village and large municipality in Michalovce District in the Kosice Region of eastern Slovakia.

== History ==
In historical records the village was first mentioned in 1221.

== Geography ==
The municipality lies at an altitude of 104 metres (341 ft) and covers an area of 43.78 km^{2} (16.90 sq mi) (2025).

== Population ==
Population statistic (10 years)
Year	1995	2005	2015	2025
Count	645	716	741	685
Difference		+11.00%	+3.49%	−7.55%

Population statistic
Year	2024	2025
Count	687	685
Difference		−0.29%

It has a population of 685 people (31 December 2025).

=== Ethnicity ===
Census 2021 (1+ %)
Ethnicity	Number	Fraction
Hungarian	401	57.94%
Slovak	272	39.3%
Not found out	50	7.22%
Romani	16	2.31%
Total	692	

In year 2021 was 692 people by ethnicity 401 as Hungarian, 272 as Slovak, 50 as Not found out, 16 as Romani, 2 as Czech and 1 as Ukrainian.

Note on population: The difference values of population numbers in the table "Population statistic" and in the sections "Ethnicity" & "Religion" is caused by the use of various statistical methods.

=== Religion ===
Census 2021 (1+ %)
Religion	Number	Fraction
Calvinist Church	322	46.53%
Roman Catholic Church	141	20.38%
Greek Catholic Church	73	10.55%
Not found out	52	7.51%
None	47	6.79%
Evangelical Church	34	4.91%
Eastern Orthodox Church	10	1.45%
Total	692	

In year 2021 was 692 people by religion 322 from Calvinist Church, 141 from Roman Catholic Church, 73 from Greek Catholic Church, 52 from Not found out, 47 from None, 34 from Evangelical Church, 10 from Eastern Orthodox Church, 5 from Other and not ascertained christian church, 3 from Jehovah's Witnesses, 2 from Ad hoc movements, 1 from Paganism and natural spirituality, 1 from Christian Congregations in Slovakia and 1 from United Methodist Church.
