= Markovce =

Village and municipality in Slovakia

Markovce Márk
- Municipality
- Flag

- Location of Markovce in the Košice Region Location of Markovce in Slovakia
- Coordinates: 48.58°N 21.85°E
- Country: Slovakia
- Region: Košice Region
- District: Michalovce District
- First mentioned: 1281

Area
  - Total: 8.01 km^{2} (3.09 sq mi)
- Elevation: 101 m (331 ft)

Population (2025)
  - Total: 1,093
- Time zone: UTC+1 (CET)
  - Summer (DST): UTC+2 (CEST)
- Postal code: 720 6
- Area code: +421 56
- Vehicle registration plate (until 2022): MI
- Website: www.markovce.eu

Markovce (Hungarian: Márk) is a village and municipality in Michalovce District in the Kosice Region of eastern Slovakia.

== History ==
In historical records the village was first mentioned in 1281.

== Geography ==
The municipality lies at an altitude of 101 metres (331 ft) and covers an area of 8.01 km^{2} (3.09 sq mi) (2025).

== Population ==
Population statistic (10 years)
Year	1995	2005	2015	2025
Count	685	830	954	1093
Difference		+21.16%	+14.93%	+14.57%

Population statistic
Year	2024	2025
Count	1081	1093
Difference		+1.11%

It has a population of 1093 people (31 December 2025).

=== Ethnicity ===
Census 2021 (1+ %)
Ethnicity	Number	Fraction
Slovak	970	91.68%
Romani	58	5.48%
Not found out	57	5.38%
Total	1058	

In year 2021 was 1058 people by ethnicity 970 as Slovak, 58 as Romani, 57 as Not found out, 5 as Rusyn, 3 as Czech, 1 as Russian, 1 as Polish and 1 as Other.

Note on population: The difference values of population numbers in the table "Population statistic" and in the sections "Ethnicity" & "Religion" is caused by the use of various statistical methods.

=== Religion ===
Census 2021 (1+ %)
Religion	Number	Fraction
Eastern Orthodox Church	719	67.96%
Roman Catholic Church	166	15.69%
Not found out	59	5.58%
Greek Catholic Church	48	4.54%
None	44	4.16%
Evangelical Church	12	1.13%
Total	1058	

In year 2021 was 1058 people by religion 719 from Eastern Orthodox Church, 166 from Roman Catholic Church, 59 from Not found out, 48 from Greek Catholic Church, 44 from None, 12 from Evangelical Church, 8 from Calvinist Church, 1 from Paganism and natural spirituality and 1 from Ad hoc movements.
