= Tušická Nová Ves =

Village and municipality in Slovakia

Tušická Nová Ves Tusaújfalu
- Municipality
- Flag

- Location of Tušická Nová Ves in the Košice Region Location of Tušická Nová Ves in Slovakia
- Coordinates: 48.72°N 21.77°E
- Country: Slovakia
- Region: Košice Region
- District: Michalovce District
- First mentioned: 1342

Area
  - Total: 4.32 km^{2} (1.67 sq mi)
- Elevation: 108 m (354 ft)

Population (2025)
  - Total: 510
- Time zone: UTC+1 (CET)
  - Summer (DST): UTC+2 (CEST)
- Postal code: 720 2
- Area code: +421 56
- Vehicle registration plate (until 2022): MI
- Website: www.tusickanovaves.sk

Tušická Nová Ves (Hungarian: Tusaújfalu) is a village and municipality in Michalovce District in the Kosice Region of eastern Slovakia.

== History ==
In historical records the village was first mentioned in 1342.

== Geography ==
The municipality lies at an altitude of 108 metres (354 ft) and covers an area of 4.32 km^{2} (1.67 sq mi) (2025).

== Population ==
Population statistic (10 years)
Year	1995	2005	2015	2025
Count	633	574	539	510
Difference		−9.32%	−6.09%	−5.38%

Population statistic
Year	2024	2025
Count	506	510
Difference		+0.79%

It has a population of 510 people (31 December 2025).

=== Ethnicity ===
Census 2021 (1+ %)
Ethnicity	Number	Fraction
Slovak	513	97.9%
Not found out	13	2.48%
Total	524	

In year 2021 was 524 people by ethnicity 513 as Slovak, 13 as Not found out, 2 as Czech and 2 as Hungarian.

Note on population: The difference values of population numbers in the table "Population statistic" and in the sections "Ethnicity" & "Religion" is caused by the use of various statistical methods.

=== Religion ===
Census 2021 (1+ %)
Religion	Number	Fraction
Roman Catholic Church	286	54.58%
Calvinist Church	97	18.51%
Greek Catholic Church	55	10.5%
Jehovah's Witnesses	27	5.15%
None	26	4.96%
Evangelical Church	13	2.48%
Not found out	9	1.72%
Eastern Orthodox Church	7	1.34%
Total	524	

In year 2021 was 524 people by religion 286 from Roman Catholic Church, 97 from Calvinist Church, 55 from Greek Catholic Church, 27 from Jehovah's Witnesses, 26 from None, 13 from Evangelical Church, 9 from Not found out, 7 from Eastern Orthodox Church, 1 from Other and not ascertained christian church, 1 from Other, 1 from Buddhism and 1 from Ad hoc movements.

== See also ==
- List of municipalities and towns in Michalovce District
- List of municipalities and towns in Slovakia
