= Krásnovce =

Village and municipality in Slovakia

Krásnovce Karaszna
- Municipality
- Flag

- Location of Krásnovce in the Košice Region Location of Krásnovce in Slovakia
- Coordinates: 48.72°N 21.88°E
- Country: Slovakia
- Region: Košice Region
- District: Michalovce District
- First mentioned: 1403

Area
  - Total: 4.63 km^{2} (1.79 sq mi)
- Elevation: 109 m (358 ft)

Population (2025)
  - Total: 612
- Time zone: UTC+1 (CET)
  - Summer (DST): UTC+2 (CEST)
- Postal code: 720 1
- Area code: +421 56
- Vehicle registration plate (until 2022): MI
- Website: krasnovce.eu

Krásnovce (Hungarian: Karaszna, until 1899 Krásznóc) is a village and municipality in Michalovce District in the Kosice Region of eastern Slovakia.

== History ==
In historical records the village was first mentioned in 1403. Before the establishment of independent Czechoslovakia in 1918, it was part of Zemplén County within the Kingdom of Hungary.

== Geography ==
The municipality lies at an altitude of 109 metres (358 ft) and covers an area of 4.63 km^{2} (1.79 sq mi) (2025).

== Population ==
Population statistic (10 years)
Year	1995	2005	2015	2025
Count	575	592	625	612
Difference		+2.95%	+5.57%	−2.08%

Population statistic
Year	2024	2025
Count	619	612
Difference		−1.13%

It has a population of 612 people (31 December 2025).

=== Ethnicity ===
Census 2021 (1+ %)
Ethnicity	Number	Fraction
Slovak	623	97.34%
Rusyn	16	2.5%
Not found out	10	1.56%
Total	640	

In year 2021 was 640 people by ethnicity 623 as Slovak, 16 as Rusyn, 10 as Not found out, 3 as Polish, 3 as Other, 2 as Czech, 1 as Irish, 1 as Ukrainian, 1 as Italian and 1 as Hungarian.

Note on population: The difference values of population numbers in the table "Population statistic" and in the sections "Ethnicity" & "Religion" is caused by the use of various statistical methods.

=== Religion ===
Census 2021 (1+ %)
Religion	Number	Fraction
Roman Catholic Church	230	35.94%
Evangelical Church	128	20%
Greek Catholic Church	117	18.28%
Eastern Orthodox Church	87	13.59%
Calvinist Church	37	5.78%
None	30	4.69%
Not found out	7	1.09%
Total	640	

In year 2021 was 640 people by religion 230 from Roman Catholic Church, 128 from Evangelical Church, 117 from Greek Catholic Church, 87 from Eastern Orthodox Church, 37 from Calvinist Church, 30 from None, 7 from Not found out, 2 from Jehovah's Witnesses and 2 from Apostolic Church.

== Culture ==
The village has a public library and a football pitch.
