= Kačanov =

Village and municipality in Slovakia

Kačanov Kácsánd
- Municipality
- Flag

- Location of Kačanov in the Košice Region Location of Kačanov in Slovakia
- Coordinates: 48.60°N 21.85°E
- Country: Slovakia
- Region: Košice Region
- District: Michalovce District
- First mentioned: 1304

Area
  - Total: 5.78 km^{2} (2.23 sq mi)
- Elevation: 100 m (330 ft)

Population (2025)
  - Total: 557
- Time zone: UTC+1 (CET)
  - Summer (DST): UTC+2 (CEST)
- Postal code: 720 5
- Area code: +421 56
- Vehicle registration plate (until 2022): MI
- Website: www.kacanov.sk

Kačanov (Hungarian: Kácsánd) is a village and municipality in Michalovce District in the Kosice Region of eastern Slovakia.

== History ==
In historical records the village was first mentioned in 1304. Before the establishment of independent Czechoslovakia in 1918, it was part of Zemplén County within the Kingdom of Hungary.

== Geography ==
The municipality lies at an altitude of 100 metres (330 ft) and covers an area of 5.78 km^{2} (2.23 sq mi) (2025).

== Population ==
Population statistic (10 years)
Year	1995	2005	2015	2025
Count	362	396	447	557
Difference		+9.39%	+12.87%	+24.60%

Population statistic
Year	2024	2025
Count	545	557
Difference		+2.20%

It has a population of 557 people (31 December 2025).

=== Ethnicity ===
Census 2021 (1+ %)
Ethnicity	Number	Fraction
Slovak	500	98.81%
Romani	7	1.38%
Not found out	6	1.18%
Total	506	

In year 2021 was 506 people by ethnicity 500 as Slovak, 7 as Romani, 6 as Not found out, 2 as Czech, 1 as Rusyn and 1 as Other.

Note on population: The difference values of population numbers in the table "Population statistic" and in the sections "Ethnicity" & "Religion" is caused by the use of various statistical methods.

=== Religion ===
Census 2021 (1+ %)
Religion	Number	Fraction
Eastern Orthodox Church	213	42.09%
Roman Catholic Church	143	28.26%
None	69	13.64%
Greek Catholic Church	57	11.26%
Calvinist Church	15	2.96%
Total	506	

In year 2021 was 506 people by religion 213 from Eastern Orthodox Church, 143 from Roman Catholic Church, 69 from None, 57 from Greek Catholic Church, 15 from Calvinist Church, 4 from Not found out, 4 from Evangelical Church and 1 from Christian Congregations in Slovakia.

== Culture ==
The village has a small public library and a food store.

== Genealogical resources ==
The records for genealogical research are available at the state archive "Statny Archiv in Presov, Slovakia"

- Roman Catholic church records (births/marriages/deaths): 1788-1897 (parish B)
- Greek Catholic church records (births/marriages/deaths): 1786-1922 (parish B)
- Reformated church records (births/marriages/deaths): 1761-1896 (parish B)

== See also ==
- List of municipalities and towns in Slovakia
