= Ložín =

Village and municipality in Slovakia

Ložín Lazony
- Municipality
- Flag

- Location of Ložín in the Košice Region Location of Ložín in Slovakia
- Coordinates: 48.66°N 21.84°E
- Country: Slovakia
- Region: Košice Region
- District: Michalovce District
- First mentioned: 1227

Area
  - Total: 8.24 km^{2} (3.18 sq mi)
- Elevation: 119 m (390 ft)

Population (2025)
  - Total: 831
- Time zone: UTC+1 (CET)
  - Summer (DST): UTC+2 (CEST)
- Postal code: 720 5
- Area code: +421 56
- Vehicle registration plate (until 2022): MI
- Website: obeclozin.sk

Ložín (Hungarian: Lazony) is a village and municipality in Michalovce District in the Kosice Region of eastern Slovakia.

== History ==
In historical records the village was first mentioned in 1227.

== Geography ==
The municipality lies at an altitude of 119 metres (390 ft) and covers an area of 8.24 km^{2} (3.18 sq mi) (2025).

== Population ==
Population statistic (10 years)
Year	1995	2005	2015	2025
Count	753	811	800	831
Difference		+7.70%	−1.35%	+3.87%

Population statistic
Year	2024	2025
Count	833	831
Difference		−0.24%

It has a population of 831 people (31 December 2025).

=== Ethnicity ===
Census 2021 (1+ %)
Ethnicity	Number	Fraction
Slovak	812	97.94%
Romani	98	11.82%
Not found out	12	1.44%
Total	829	

In year 2021 was 829 people by ethnicity 812 as Slovak, 98 as Romani, 12 as Not found out, 3 as Czech, 2 as Other, 1 as German and 1 as Hungarian.

Note on population: The difference values of population numbers in the table "Population statistic" and in the sections "Ethnicity" & "Religion" is caused by the use of various statistical methods.

=== Religion ===
Census 2021 (1+ %)
Religion	Number	Fraction
Roman Catholic Church	360	43.43%
Greek Catholic Church	151	18.21%
None	82	9.89%
Eastern Orthodox Church	78	9.41%
Calvinist Church	75	9.05%
Evangelical Church	41	4.95%
Not found out	27	3.26%
Jehovah's Witnesses	12	1.45%
Total	829	

In year 2021 was 829 people by religion 360 from Roman Catholic Church, 151 from Greek Catholic Church, 82 from None, 78 from Eastern Orthodox Church, 75 from Calvinist Church, 41 from Evangelical Church, 27 from Not found out, 12 from Jehovah's Witnesses and 3 from Ad hoc movements.

== Culture ==
The village has a public library and a football pitch.

== Gallery ==
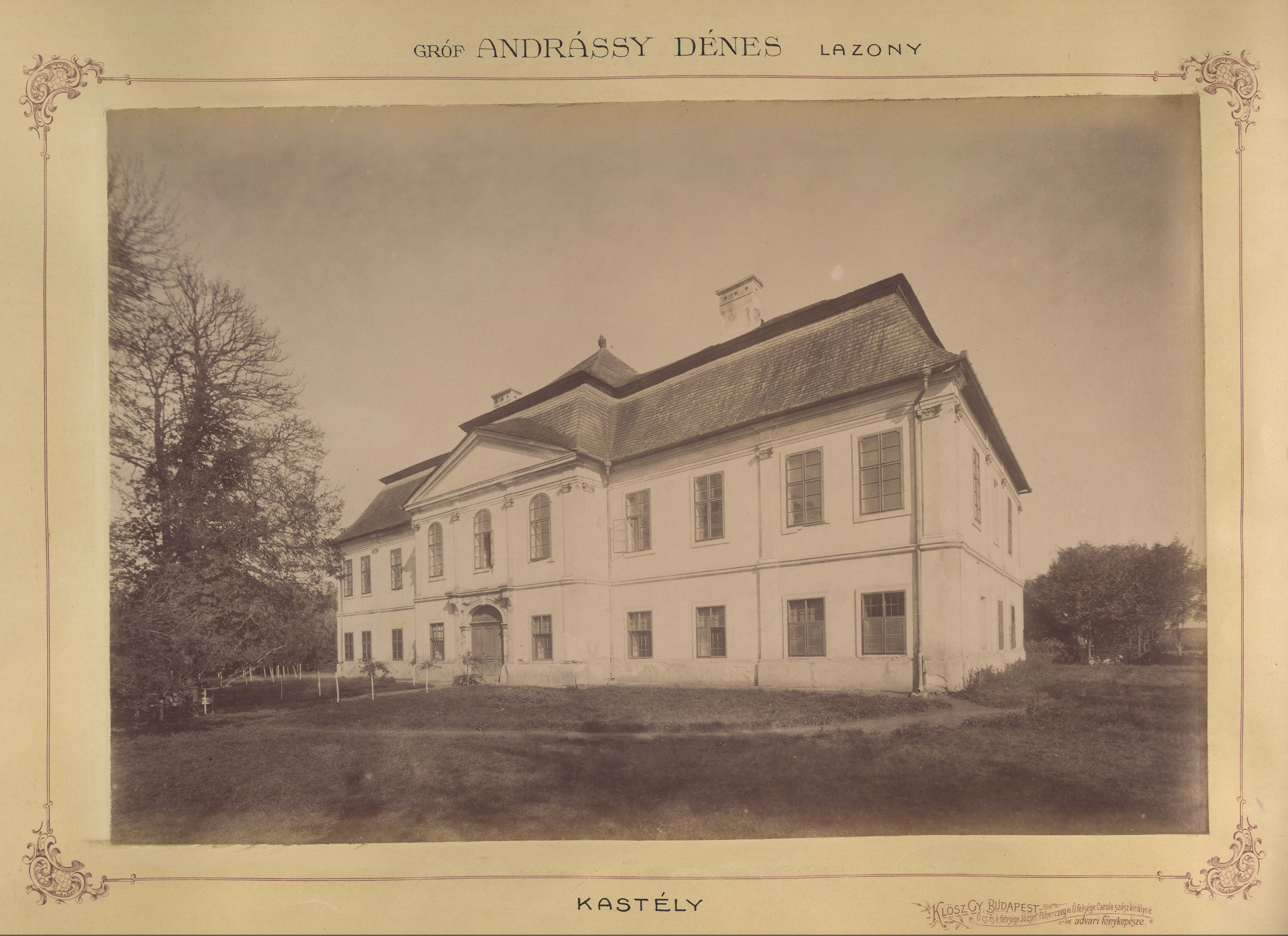
The manor house in Ložín (photo from the late 1890s or around 1900)
