= Kaluža =

Village and municipality in Michalovce District in Slovakia

Kaluža Ungtavas
- Municipality
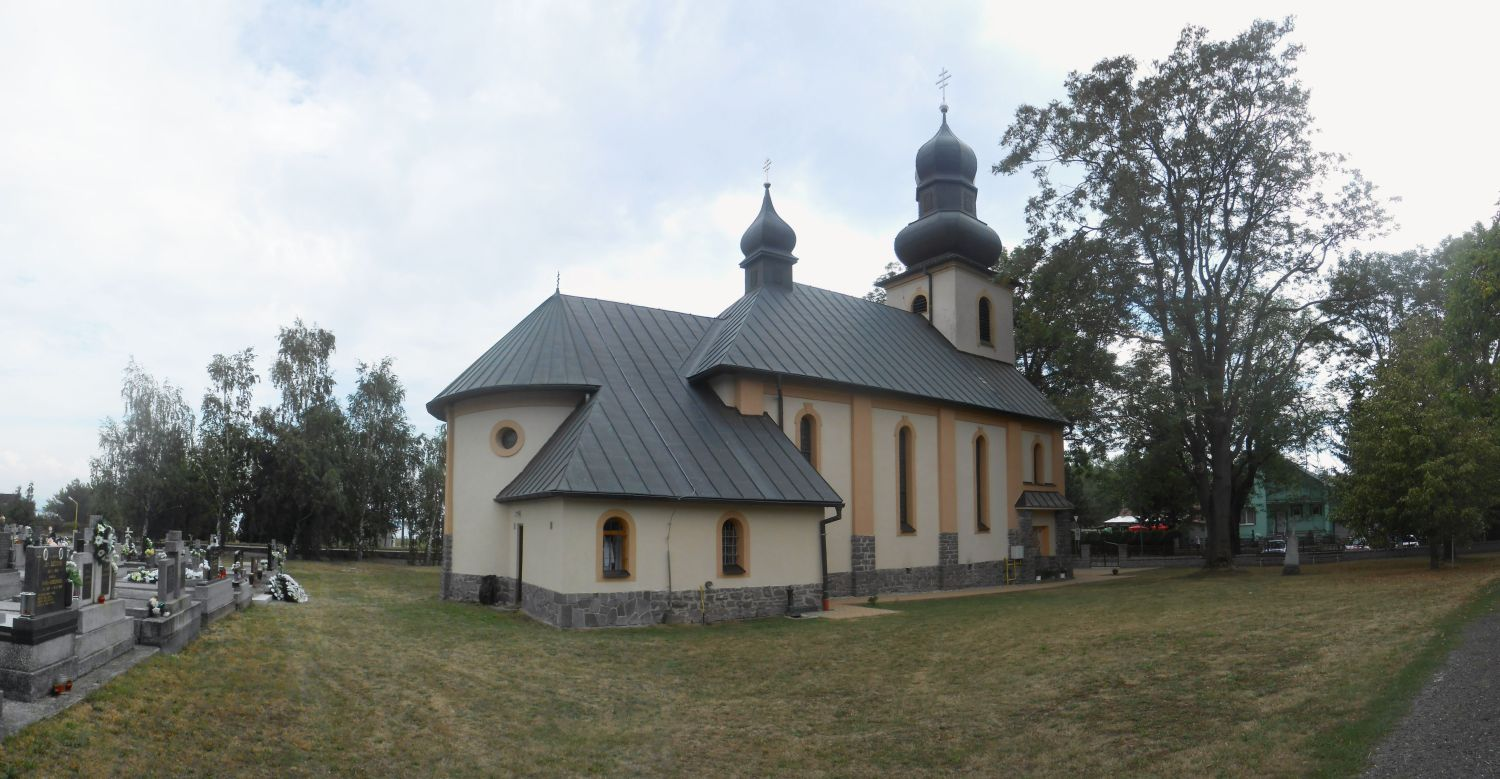
- Church of Saint Thomas in Kaluža

- Flag

- Location of Kaluža in the Košice Region Location of Kaluža in Slovakia
- Coordinates: 48.82°N 22.00°E
- Country: Slovakia
- Region: Košice Region
- District: Michalovce District
- First mentioned: 1336

Area
  - Total: 9.93 km^{2} (3.83 sq mi)
- Elevation: 117 m (384 ft)

Population (2025)
  - Total: 490
- Time zone: UTC+1 (CET)
  - Summer (DST): UTC+2 (CEST)
- Postal code: 723 6
- Area code: +421 56
- Vehicle registration plate (until 2022): MI
- Website: www.kaluza.sk

Kaluža (Hungarian: Ungtavas) is a village and municipality in Michalovce District in the Kosice Region of eastern Slovakia.

== History ==
In historical records the village was first mentioned in 1336. Before the establishment of independent Czechoslovakia in 1918, it was part of Ung County within the Kingdom of Hungary.

== Geography ==
The municipality lies at an altitude of 117 metres (384 ft) and covers an area of 9.93 km^{2} (3.83 sq mi) (2025).

== Population ==
Population statistic (10 years)
Year	1995	2005	2015	2025
Count	343	370	398	490
Difference		+7.87%	+7.56%	+23.11%

Population statistic
Year	2024	2025
Count	481	490
Difference		+1.87%

It has a population of 490 people (2025-12-31).

== Genealogical resources ==
The records for genealogical research are available at the state archive "Statny Archiv in Presov, Slovakia"

- Roman Catholic church records (births/marriages/deaths): 1742-1935 (parish B)
- Greek Catholic church records (births/marriages/deaths): 1822-1922 (parish B)

== See also ==
- List of municipalities and towns in Slovakia
