= Šamudovce =

Village and municipality in Slovakia

Šamudovce Sámogy
- Municipality
- Flag

- Location of Šamudovce in the Košice Region Location of Šamudovce in Slovakia
- Coordinates: 48.70°N 21.88°E
- Country: Slovakia
- Region: Košice Region
- District: Michalovce District
- First mentioned: 1315

Area
  - Total: 4.84 km^{2} (1.87 sq mi)
- Elevation: 108 m (354 ft)

Population (2025)
  - Total: 615
- Time zone: UTC+1 (CET)
  - Summer (DST): UTC+2 (CEST)
- Postal code: 720 1
- Area code: +421 56
- Vehicle registration plate (until 2022): MI
- Website: www.obecsamudovce.sk

Šamudovce (Slovak pronunciation: [ˈʂamudɔwtse]; Hungarian: Sámogy) is a village and municipality in Michalovce District in the Kosice Region of eastern Slovakia.

== History ==
In historical records the village was first mentioned in 1315.

== Geography ==
The municipality lies at an altitude of 108 metres (354 ft) and covers an area of 4.84 km^{2} (1.87 sq mi) (2025).

== Population ==
Population statistic (10 years)
Year	1995	2005	2015	2025
Count	417	564	643	615
Difference		+35.25%	+14.00%	−4.35%

Population statistic
Year	2024	2025
Count	619	615
Difference		−0.64%

It has a population of 615 people (31 December 2025).

=== Ethnicity ===
Census 2021 (1+ %)
Ethnicity	Number	Fraction
Slovak	611	98.54%
Romani	21	3.38%
Rusyn	7	1.12%
Total	620	

In year 2021 was 620 people by ethnicity 611 as Slovak, 21 as Romani, 7 as Rusyn, 5 as Not found out, 2 as Czech, 2 as Other and 1 as Hungarian.

Note on population: The difference values of population numbers in the table "Population statistic" and in the sections "Ethnicity" & "Religion" is caused by the use of various statistical methods.

=== Religion ===
Census 2021 (1+ %)
Religion	Number	Fraction
Eastern Orthodox Church	308	49.68%
Greek Catholic Church	90	14.52%
Roman Catholic Church	88	14.19%
Evangelical Church	56	9.03%
None	48	7.74%
Calvinist Church	8	1.29%
Total	620	

In year 2021 was 620 people by religion 308 from Eastern Orthodox Church, 90 from Greek Catholic Church, 88 from Roman Catholic Church, 56 from Evangelical Church, 48 from None, 8 from Calvinist Church, 6 from Not found out, 6 from Apostolic Church, 4 from Jehovah's Witnesses, 3 from Christian Congregations in Slovakia, 1 from Other, 1 from United Methodist Church and 1 from Buddhism.

== See also ==
- List of municipalities and towns in Michalovce District
- List of municipalities and towns in Slovakia
