= Ižkovce =

Village and municipality in Slovakia

Ižkovce Iske
- Municipality
- Flag

- Location of Ižkovce in the Košice Region Location of Ižkovce in Slovakia
- Coordinates: 48.55°N 21.95°E
- Country: Slovakia
- Region: Košice Region
- District: Michalovce District
- First mentioned: 1297

Area
  - Total: 4.22 km^{2} (1.63 sq mi)
- Elevation: 100 m (330 ft)

Population (2025)
  - Total: 94
- Time zone: UTC+1 (CET)
  - Summer (DST): UTC+2 (CEST)
- Postal code: 767 2
- Area code: +421 56
- Vehicle registration plate (until 2022): MI
- Website: www.obecizkovce.sk

Ižkovce (Slovak pronunciation: [ˈiʂkɔwtse]; Hungarian: Iske or Iskefalva) (1297 Iske, 1427 Izke) is a village and municipality in Michalovce District in the Košice Region of eastern Slovakia.

== History ==
In historical records the village was first mentioned in 1297 when it was a feud of Čičarovce. Before the establishment of independent Czechoslovakia in 1918, it was part of Ung County within the Kingdom of Hungary. From 1938 to 1944 it belonged to Hungary as a result of the First Vienna Award.

== Geography ==
The municipality lies at an altitude of 100 metres (330 ft) and covers an area of 4.22 km^{2} (1.63 sq mi) (2025).

== Population ==
Population statistic (10 years)
Year	1995	2005	2015	2025
Count	99	110	101	94
Difference		+11.11%	−8.18%	−6.93%

Population statistic
Year	2024	2025
Count	92	94
Difference		+2.17%

It has a population of 94 people (31 December 2025).

=== Ethnicity ===
Census 2021 (1+ %)
Ethnicity	Number	Fraction
Hungarian	70	76.92%
Slovak	22	24.17%
Not found out	6	6.59%
Romani	1	1.09%
Total	91	

In year 2021 was 91 people by ethnicity 70 as Hungarian, 22 as Slovak, 6 as Not found out and 1 as Romani.

Note on population: The difference values of population numbers in the table "Population statistic" and in the sections "Ethnicity" & "Religion" is caused by the use of various statistical methods.

=== Religion ===
Census 2021 (1+ %)
Religion	Number	Fraction
Calvinist Church	48	52.75%
Roman Catholic Church	24	26.37%
Not found out	5	5.49%
Evangelical Church	5	5.49%
Greek Catholic Church	4	4.4%
None	4	4.4%
Jehovah's Witnesses	1	1.1%
Total	91	

In year 2021 was 91 people by religion 48 from Calvinist Church, 24 from Roman Catholic Church, 5 from Not found out, 5 from Evangelical Church, 4 from Greek Catholic Church, 4 from None and 1 from Jehovah's Witnesses.

== Genealogical resources ==
The records for genealogical research are available at the state archive "Statny Archiv in Presov, Slovakia"

- Roman Catholic church records (births/marriages/deaths): 1781-1876 (parish B)
- Greek Catholic church records (births/marriages/deaths): 1789-1886 (parish B)

== See also ==
- List of municipalities and towns in Slovakia
