= Hnojné =

Hnojné Hanajna
- Municipality
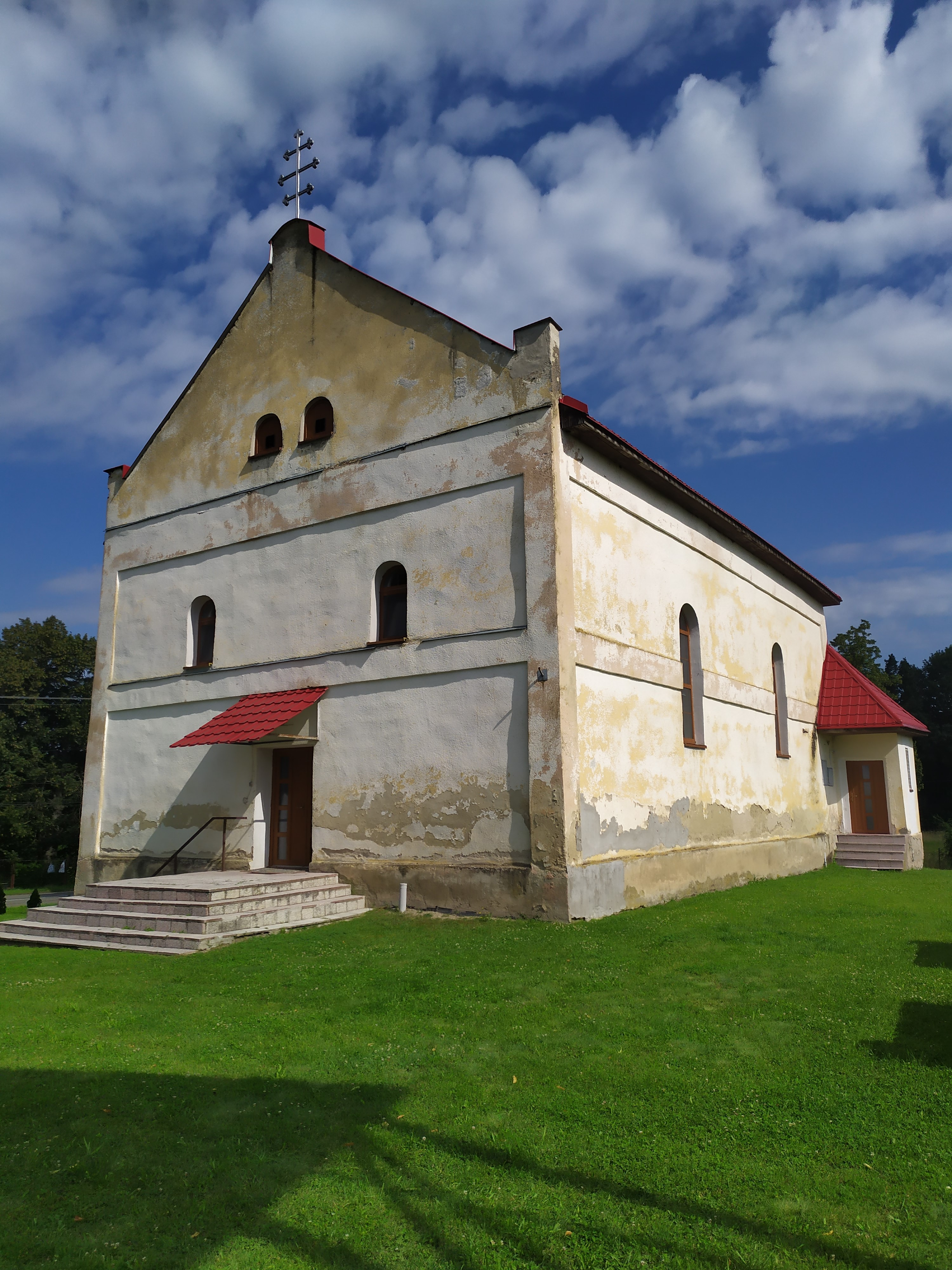

- Flag

- Location of Hnojné in the Košice Region Location of Hnojné in Slovakia
- Coordinates: 48.78°N 22.07°E
- Country: Slovakia
- Region: Košice Region
- District: Michalovce District
- First mentioned: 1390

Area
  - Total: 6.81 km^{2} (2.63 sq mi)
- Elevation: 108 m (354 ft)

Population (2025)
  - Total: 245
- Time zone: UTC+1 (CET)
  - Summer (DST): UTC+2 (CEST)
- Postal code: 723 3
- Area code: +421 56
- Vehicle registration plate (until 2022): MI
- Website: www.hnojne.sk

Hnojné (Hungarian: Hanajna) is a village and municipality in Michalovce District in the Kosice Region of eastern Slovakia.

== History ==
In historical records the village was first mentioned in 1390. Before the establishment of independent Czechoslovakia in 1918, it was part of Ung County within the Kingdom of Hungary.

== Geography ==
The municipality lies at an altitude of 108 metres (354 ft) and covers an area of 6.81 km^{2} (2.63 sq mi) (2025).

== Population ==
Population statistic (10 years)
Year	1995	2005	2015	2025
Count	166	249	221	245
Difference		+50%	−11.24%	+10.85%

Population statistic
Year	2024	2025
Count	243	245
Difference		+0.82%

It has a population of 245 people (31 December 2025).

=== Ethnicity ===
Census 2021 (1+ %)
Ethnicity	Number	Fraction
Slovak	213	91.81%
Romani	54	23.27%
Not found out	22	9.48%
Ukrainian	3	1.29%
Total	232	

In year 2021 was 232 people by ethnicity 213 as Slovak, 54 as Romani, 22 as Not found out, 3 as Ukrainian and 1 as Russian.

Note on population: The difference values of population numbers in the table "Population statistic" and in the sections "Ethnicity" & "Religion" is caused by the use of various statistical methods.

=== Religion ===
Census 2021 (1+ %)
Religion	Number	Fraction
Roman Catholic Church	103	44.4%
None	43	18.53%
Eastern Orthodox Church	35	15.09%
Greek Catholic Church	35	15.09%
Not found out	12	5.17%
Evangelical Church	3	1.29%
Total	232	

In year 2021 was 232 people by religion 103 from Roman Catholic Church, 43 from None, 35 from Eastern Orthodox Church, 35 from Greek Catholic Church, 12 from Not found out, 3 from Evangelical Church and 1 from Seventh-day Adventist Church.

== Culture ==
The village has a small public library and food stores.

== Transport ==
The nearest railway station is 17 kilometres away at Michalovce.

== Genealogical resources ==
The records for genealogical research are available at the state archive "Statny Archiv in Presov, Slovakia"

- Greek Catholic church records (births/marriages/deaths): 1805-1937 (parish B)

== Gallery ==
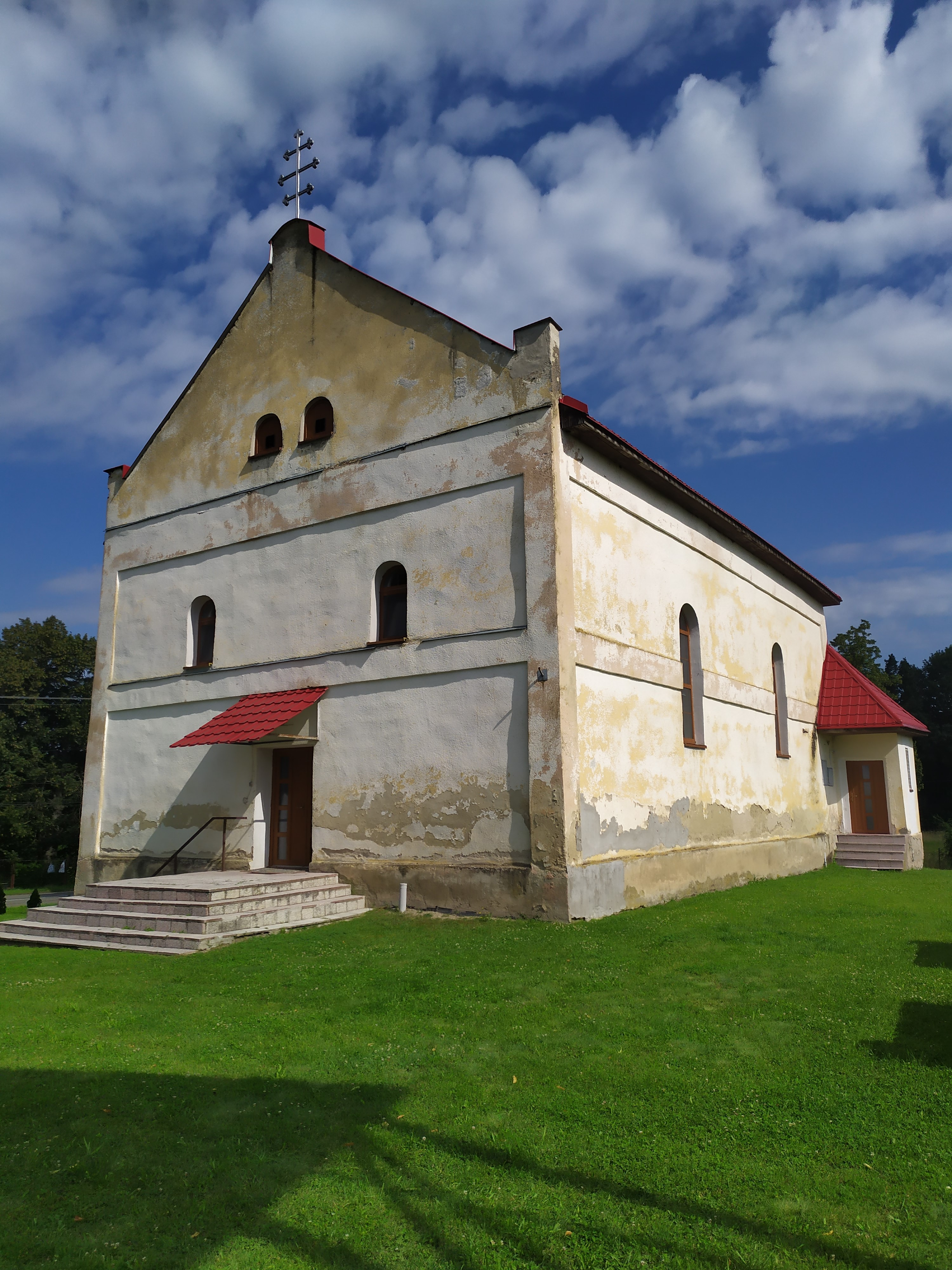
Church of the Transfiguration of the Lord in Hnojné

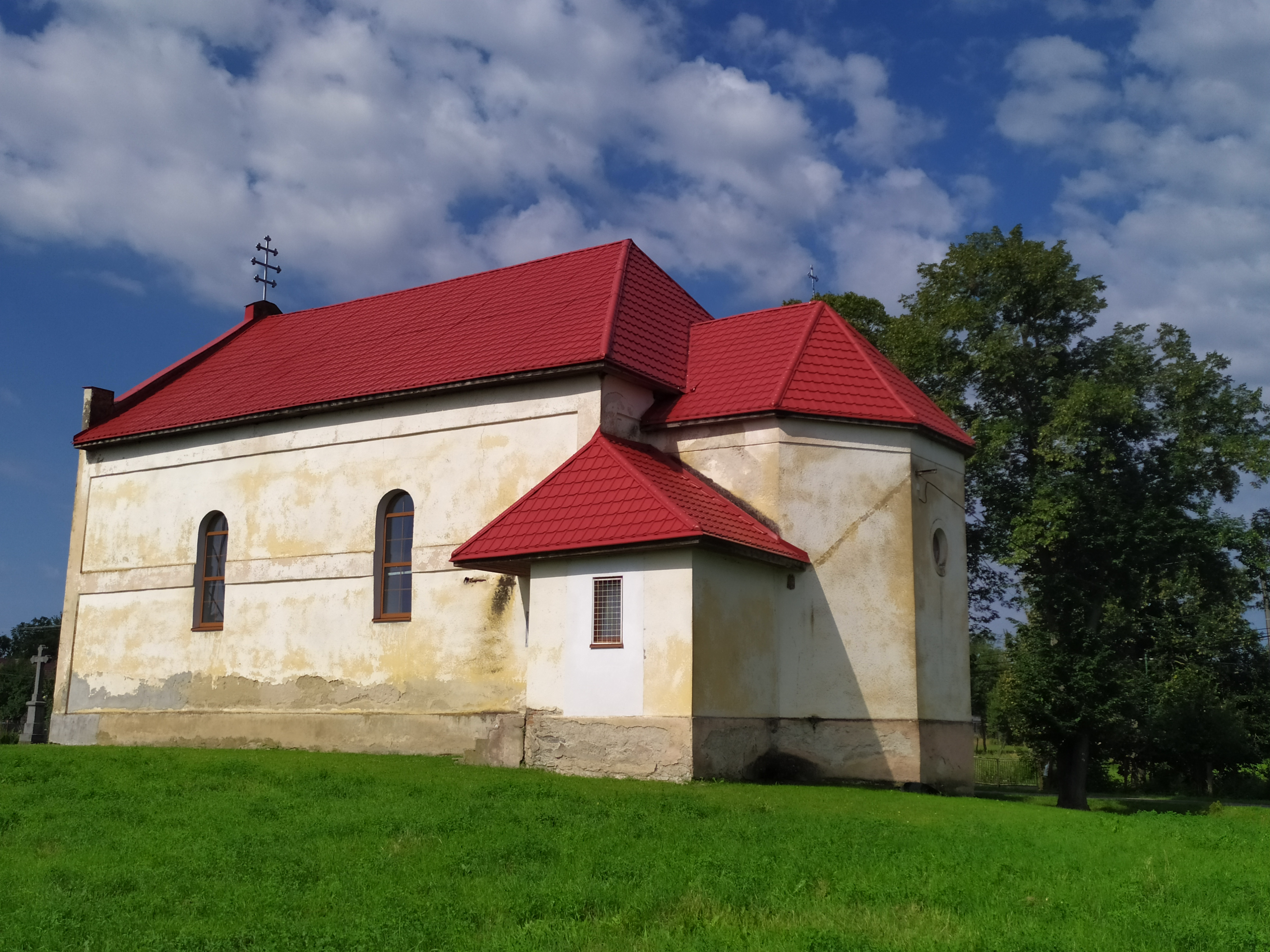
Church of the Transfiguration of the Lord in Hnojné

== See also ==
- List of municipalities and towns in Slovakia
