= Suché =

Village in Michalovce District, Slovakia

Suché Zemplénszuha
- Municipality
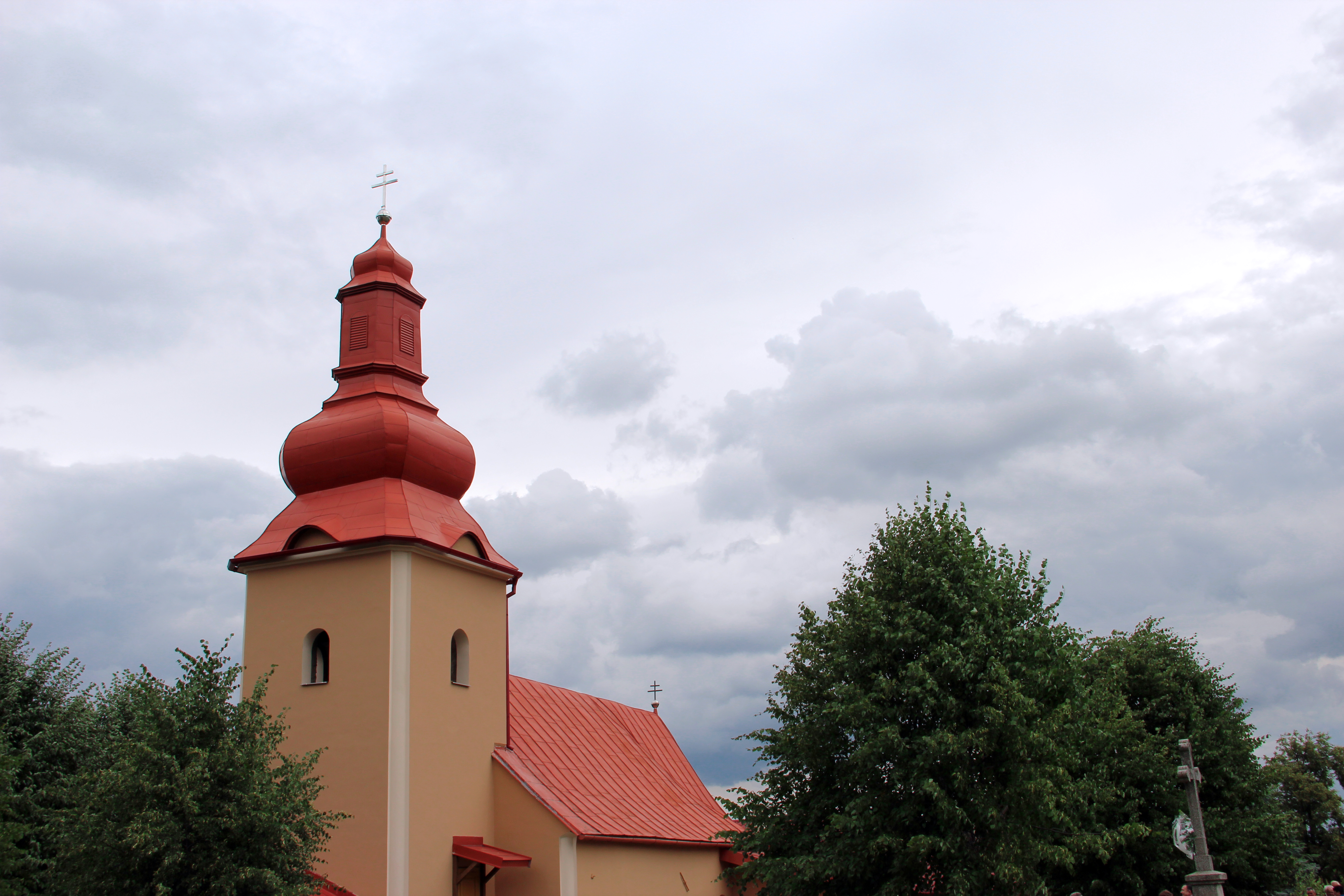

- Flag

- Location of Suché in the Košice Region Location of Suché in Slovakia
- Coordinates: 48.77°N 21.83°E
- Country: Slovakia
- Region: Košice Region
- District: Michalovce District
- First mentioned: 1266

Area
  - Total: 7.30 km^{2} (2.82 sq mi)
- Elevation: 133 m (436 ft)

Population (2025)
  - Total: 428
- Time zone: UTC+1 (CET)
  - Summer (DST): UTC+2 (CEST)
- Postal code: 710 1
- Area code: +421 56
- Vehicle registration plate (until 2022): MI
- Website: www.obecsuche.sk

Suché (Hungarian: Zemplénszuha) is a village and municipality in Michalovce District in the Kosice Region of eastern Slovakia.

== Geography ==
The municipality lies at an altitude of 133 metres (436 ft) and covers an area of 7.30 km^{2} (2.82 sq mi) (2025).

== Population ==
Population statistic (10 years)
Year	1995	2005	2015	2025
Count	439	416	392	428
Difference		−5.23%	−5.76%	+9.18%

Population statistic
Year	2024	2025
Count	424	428
Difference		+0.94%

It has a population of 428 people (31 December 2025).

=== Ethnicity ===
Census 2021 (1+ %)
Ethnicity	Number	Fraction
Slovak	400	98.28%
Not found out	7	1.71%
Total	407	

In year 2021 was 407 people by ethnicity 400 as Slovak, 7 as Not found out, 3 as English, 2 as Czech, 1 as Hungarian and 1 as Other.

Note on population: The difference values of population numbers in the table "Population statistic" and in the sections "Ethnicity" & "Religion" is caused by the use of various statistical methods.

=== Religion ===
Census 2021 (1+ %)
Religion	Number	Fraction
Roman Catholic Church	215	52.83%
Greek Catholic Church	127	31.2%
None	34	8.35%
Eastern Orthodox Church	11	2.7%
Not found out	10	2.46%
Total	407	

In year 2021 was 407 people by religion 215 from Roman Catholic Church, 127 from Greek Catholic Church, 34 from None, 11 from Eastern Orthodox Church, 10 from Not found out, 4 from Calvinist Church, 3 from Evangelical Church, 2 from Apostolic Church and 1 from Paganism and natural spirituality.

== Culture ==
The village has a small public library and a football pitch.
