= Veľké Raškovce =

Village and municipality in Slovakia

Veľké Raškovce Nagyráska
- Municipality
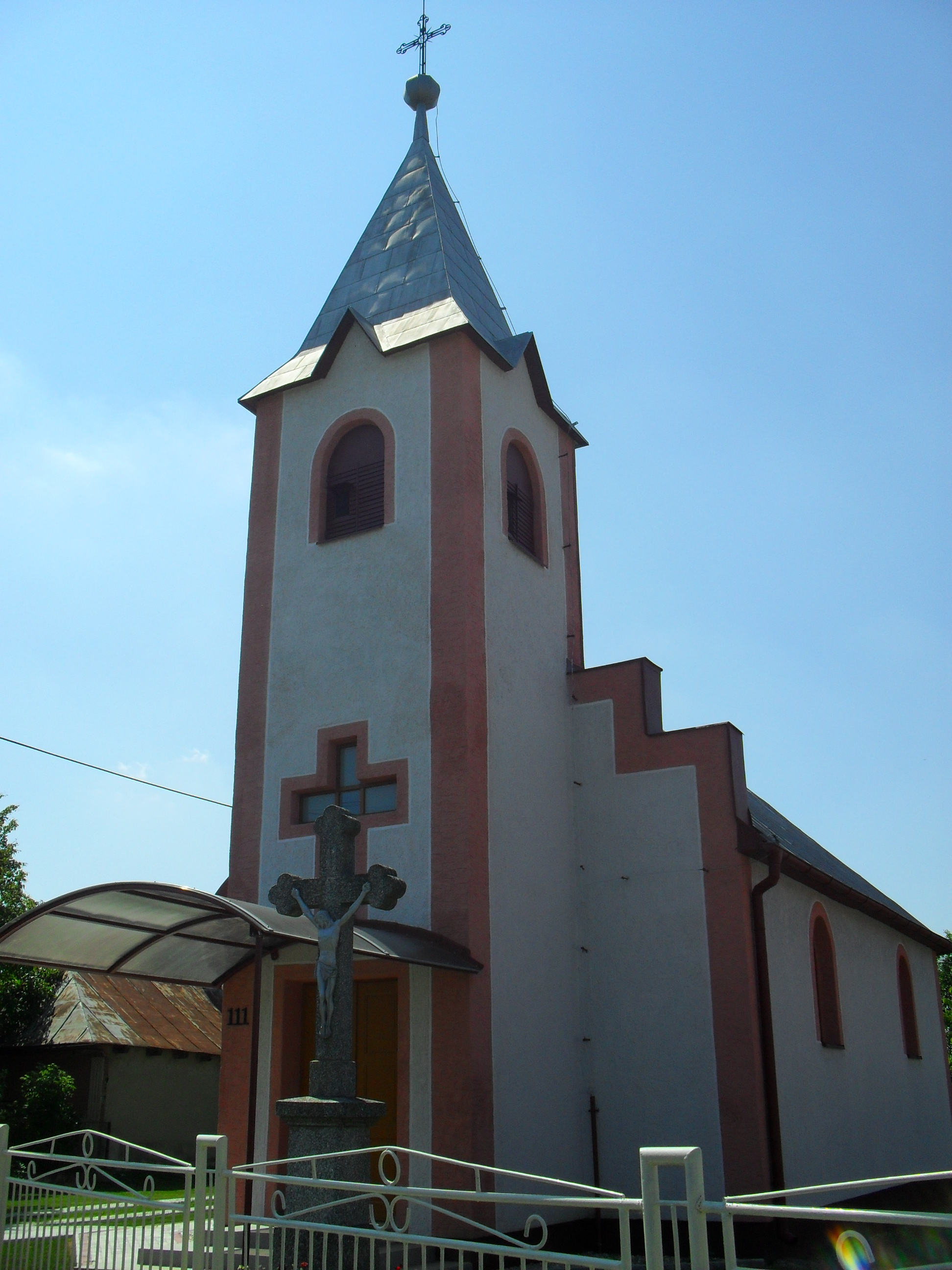

- Flag

- Location of Veľké Raškovce in the Košice Region Location of Veľké Raškovce in Slovakia
- Coordinates: 48.55°N 21.92°E
- Country: Slovakia
- Region: Košice Region
- District: Michalovce District
- First mentioned: 1332

Area
  - Total: 11.99 km^{2} (4.63 sq mi)
- Elevation: 100 m (330 ft)

Population (2025)
  - Total: 304
- Time zone: UTC+1 (CET)
  - Summer (DST): UTC+2 (CEST)
- Postal code: 767 5
- Area code: +421 56
- Vehicle registration plate (until 2022): MI
- Website: www.velkeraskovce.dcom.sk

Veľké Raškovce (Slovak pronunciation: [ˈʋeʎkeː ˈraʂkɔwtse]; Hungarian: Nagyráska) is a village and municipality in Michalovce District in the Kosice Region of eastern Slovakia.

== History ==
In historical records, the village was first mentioned in 1332.

== Geography ==
The municipality lies at an altitude of 100 metres (330 ft) and covers an area of 11.99 km^{2} (4.63 sq mi) (2025).

== Population ==
Population statistic (10 years)
| Year | 1995 | 2005 | 2015 | 2025 |
|---|---|---|---|---|
| Count | 307 | 337 | 306 | 304 |
| Difference | | +9.77% | −9.19% | −0.65% |

Population statistic
| Year | 2024 | 2025 |
|---|---|---|
| Count | 305 | 304 |
| Difference | | −0.32% |

It has a population of 304 people (31 December 2025).

=== Ethnicity ===
Census 2021 (1+ %)
| Ethnicity | Number | Fraction |
|---|---|---|
| Hungarian | 212 | 73.86% |
| Slovak | 84 | 29.26% |
| Not found out | 13 | 4.52% |
| Czech | 3 | 1.04% |
| Total | 287 | |

In year 2021 was 287 people by ethnicity 212 as Hungarian, 84 as Slovak, 13 as Not found out, 3 as Czech, 1 as Ukrainian, 1 as Romanian, 1 as Other and 1 as Albanian.

Note on population: The difference values of population numbers in the table "Population statistic" and in the sections "Ethnicity" & "Religion" is caused by the use of various statistical methods.

=== Religion ===
Census 2021 (1+ %)
| Religion | Number | Fraction |
|---|---|---|
| Calvinist Church | 118 | 41.11% |
| Roman Catholic Church | 75 | 26.13% |
| None | 27 | 9.41% |
| Greek Catholic Church | 22 | 7.67% |
| Jehovah's Witnesses | 17 | 5.92% |
| Not found out | 12 | 4.18% |
| Evangelical Church | 7 | 2.44% |
| Islam | 4 | 1.39% |
| Total | 287 | |

In year 2021 was 287 people by religion 118 from Calvinist Church, 75 from Roman Catholic Church, 27 from None, 22 from Greek Catholic Church, 17 from Jehovah's Witnesses, 12 from Not found out, 7 from Evangelical Church, 4 from Islam, 2 from Eastern Orthodox Church, 2 from Baptists Church and 1 from Other and not ascertained christian church.

== Culture ==
The village has a cultural center, a football pitch and a recreational area with fish ponds.

== See also ==
- List of municipalities and towns in Michalovce District
- List of municipalities and towns in Slovakia
