= Zbudza =

Village and municipality in Slovakia

Zbudza Izbugya
- Municipality
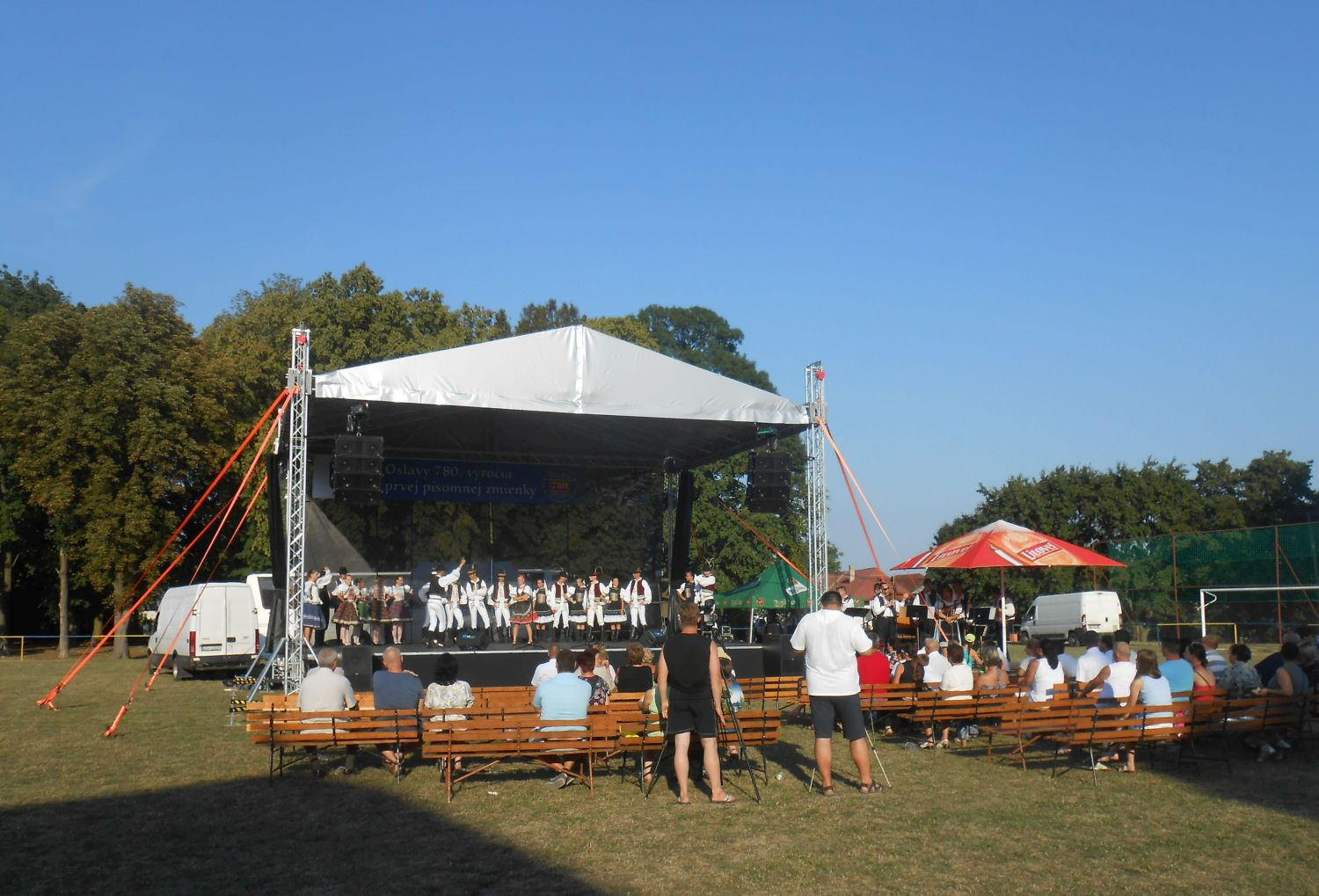

- Flag

- Location of Zbudza in the Košice Region Location of Zbudza in Slovakia
- Coordinates: 48.82°N 21.90°E
- Country: Slovakia
- Region: Košice Region
- District: Michalovce District
- First mentioned: 1235

Government
  - Mayor: Matej Havrilla (KDH)

Area
  - Total: 9.07 km^{2} (3.50 sq mi)
- Elevation: 127 m (417 ft)

Population (2025)
  - Total: 510
- Time zone: UTC+1 (CET)
  - Summer (DST): UTC+2 (CEST)
- Postal code: 722 3
- Area code: +421 56
- Vehicle registration plate (until 2022): MI
- Website: zbudza.sk

Zbudza (Hungarian: Izbugya) is a village and municipality in Michalovce District in the Kosice Region of eastern Slovakia.

== History ==
In historical records the village was first mentioned in 1235.

== Geography ==
The municipality lies at an altitude of 127 metres (417 ft) and covers an area of 9.07 km^{2} (3.50 sq mi) (2025).

== Population ==
Population statistic (10 years)
Year	1995	2005	2015	2025
Count	556	530	539	510
Difference		−4.67%	+1.69%	−5.38%

Population statistic
Year	2024	2025
Count	521	510
Difference		−2.11%

It has a population of 510 people (31 December 2025).

=== Ethnicity ===
Census 2021 (1+ %)
Ethnicity	Number	Fraction
Slovak	518	96.82%
Not found out	14	2.61%
Romani	9	1.68%
Total	535	

In year 2021 was 535 people by ethnicity 518 as Slovak, 14 as Not found out, 9 as Romani, 4 as Rusyn, 3 as Czech, 3 as Other, 1 as Ukrainian, 1 as Italian, 1 as Polish and 1 as Hungarian.

Note on population: The difference values of population numbers in the table "Population statistic" and in the sections "Ethnicity" & "Religion" is caused by the use of various statistical methods.

=== Religion ===
Census 2021 (1+ %)
Religion	Number	Fraction
Roman Catholic Church	331	61.87%
Greek Catholic Church	164	30.65%
None	21	3.93%
Not found out	9	1.68%
Total	535	

In year 2021 was 535 people by religion 331 from Roman Catholic Church, 164 from Greek Catholic Church, 21 from None, 9 from Not found out, 4 from Jehovah's Witnesses, 2 from Calvinist Church, 2 from Evangelical Church, 1 from Eastern Orthodox Church and 1 from United Methodist Church.

== Culture ==
The village has a small public library, and a football pitch.

== Economy ==
The nearest railway station is at Michalovce.

== See also ==
- List of municipalities and towns in Michalovce District
- List of municipalities and towns in Slovakia
