= Laškovce =

Municipality of Slovakia

Laškovce Lask
- Municipality
- Flag

- Location of Laškovce in the Košice Region Location of Laškovce in Slovakia
- Coordinates: 48.70°N 21.85°E
- Country: Slovakia
- Region: Košice Region
- District: Michalovce District
- First mentioned: 1324

Area
  - Total: 3.30 km^{2} (1.27 sq mi)
- Elevation: 116 m (381 ft)

Population (2025)
  - Total: 774
- Time zone: UTC+1 (CET)
  - Summer (DST): UTC+2 (CEST)
- Postal code: 720 1
- Area code: +421 56
- Vehicle registration plate (until 2022): MI
- Website: www.obeclaskovce.sk

Laškovce (Hungarian: Lask) is a village and municipality in Michalovce District in the Kosice Region of eastern Slovakia.

== History ==
In historical records, the village was first mentioned in 1324. Before the establishment of independent Czechoslovakia in 1918, it was part of Zemplén County within the Kingdom of Hungary.

== Geography ==
The municipality lies at an altitude of 116 metres (381 ft) and covers an area of 3.30 km^{2} (1.27 sq mi) (2025).

== Population ==
Population statistic (10 years)
Year	1995	2005	2015	2025
Count	421	540	668	774
Difference		+28.26%	+23.70%	+15.86%

Population statistic
Year	2024	2025
Count	766	774
Difference		+1.04%

It has a population of 774 people (31 December 2025).

=== Ethnicity ===
Census 2021 (1+ %)
Ethnicity	Number	Fraction
Slovak	697	93.55%
Romani	75	10.06%
Not found out	27	3.62%
Total	745	

In year 2021 was 745 people by ethnicity 697 as Slovak, 75 as Romani, 27 as Not found out, 5 as Czech, 2 as Rusyn, 1 as Other and 1 as English.

Note on population: The difference values of population numbers in the table "Population statistic" and in the sections "Ethnicity" & "Religion" is caused by the use of various statistical methods.

=== Religion ===
Census 2021 (1+ %)
Religion	Number	Fraction
Greek Catholic Church	316	42.42%
Eastern Orthodox Church	126	16.91%
Roman Catholic Church	125	16.78%
None	65	8.72%
Not found out	59	7.92%
Evangelical Church	26	3.49%
Calvinist Church	16	2.15%
Total	745	

In year 2021 was 745 people by religion 316 from Greek Catholic Church, 126 from Eastern Orthodox Church, 125 from Roman Catholic Church, 65 from None, 59 from Not found out, 26 from Evangelical Church, 16 from Calvinist Church, 5 from Jehovah's Witnesses, 5 from Apostolic Church, 1 from Other and not ascertained christian church and 1 from Ad hoc movements.
