= Kusín =

Village and municipality in Slovakia

Kusín Harapás
- Municipality
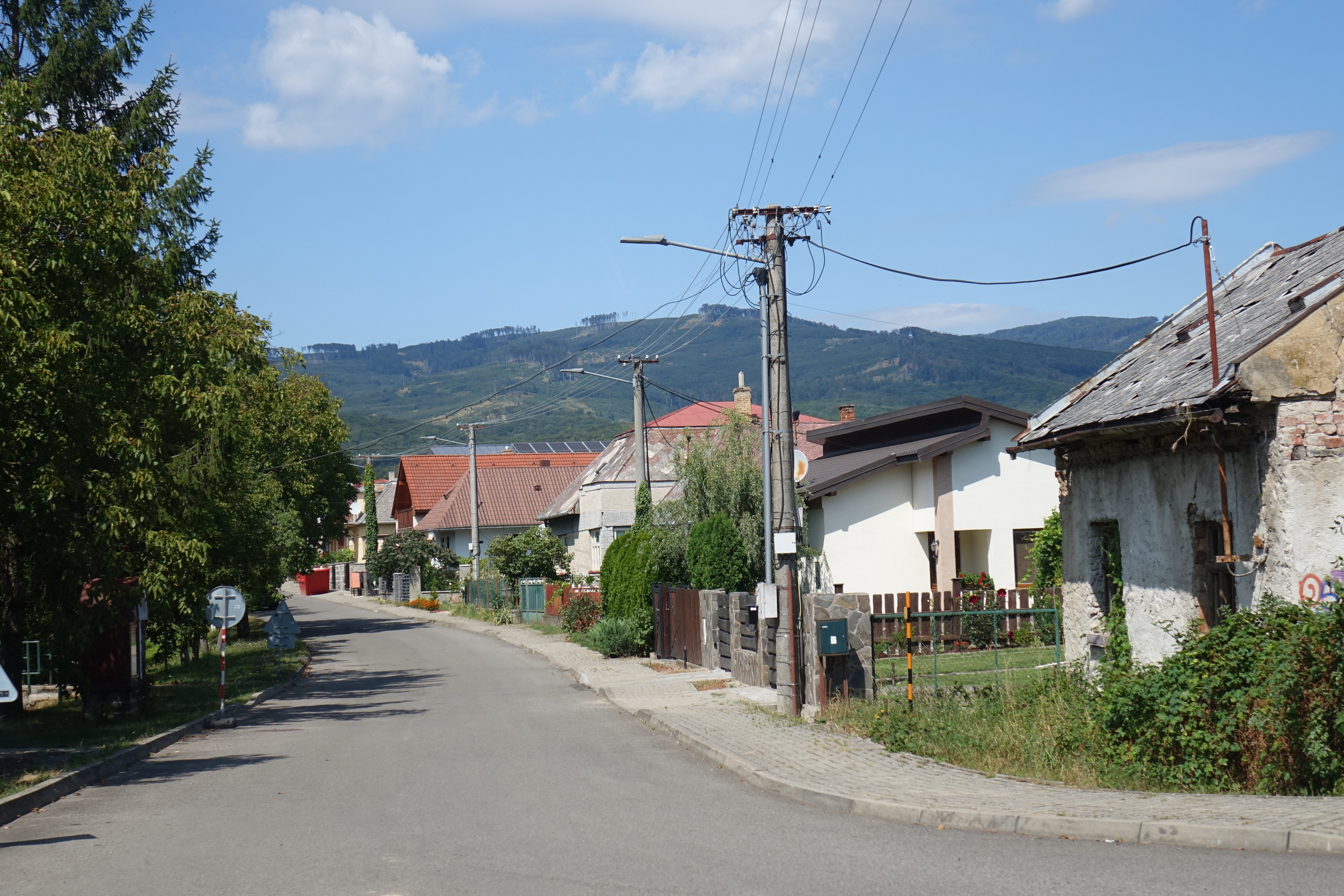

- Flag

- Location of Kusín in the Košice Region Location of Kusín in Slovakia
- Coordinates: 48.82°N 22.07°E
- Country: Slovakia
- Region: Košice Region
- District: Michalovce District
- First mentioned: 1418

Area
  - Total: 9.81 km^{2} (3.79 sq mi)
- Elevation: 123 m (404 ft)

Population (2025)
  - Total: 346
- Time zone: UTC+1 (CET)
  - Summer (DST): UTC+2 (CEST)
- Postal code: 723 2
- Area code: +421 56
- Vehicle registration plate (until 2022): MI
- Website: www.kusin.sk

Kusín (Hungarian: Harapás) is a village and municipality in Michalovce District in the Kosice Region of eastern Slovakia.

== History ==
In historical records the village was first mentioned in 1418. Before the establishment of independent Czechoslovakia in 1918, it was part of Ung County within the Kingdom of Hungary.

== Geography ==
The municipality lies at an altitude of 123 metres (404 ft) and covers an area of 9.81 km^{2} (3.79 sq mi) (2025).

== Population ==
Population statistic (10 years)
Year	1995	2005	2015	2025
Count	352	362	335	346
Difference		+2.84%	−7.45%	+3.28%

Population statistic
Year	2024	2025
Count	355	346
Difference		−2.53%

It has a population of 346 people (31 December 2025).

=== Ethnicity ===
Census 2021 (1+ %)
Ethnicity	Number	Fraction
Slovak	327	94.78%
Not found out	18	5.21%
Total	345	

In year 2021 was 345 people by ethnicity 327 as Slovak, 18 as Not found out, 3 as Rusyn, 2 as Czech, 2 as Ukrainian, 1 as Romani, 1 as Polish and 1 as Other.

Note on population: The difference values of population numbers in the table "Population statistic" and in the sections "Ethnicity" & "Religion" is caused by the use of various statistical methods.

=== Religion ===
Census 2021 (1+ %)
Religion	Number	Fraction
Greek Catholic Church	137	39.71%
Roman Catholic Church	132	38.26%
None	45	13.04%
Not found out	14	4.06%
Evangelical Church	7	2.03%
Eastern Orthodox Church	5	1.45%
Total	345	

In year 2021 was 345 people by religion 137 from Greek Catholic Church, 132 from Roman Catholic Church, 45 from None, 14 from Not found out, 7 from Evangelical Church, 5 from Eastern Orthodox Church, 1 from Calvinist Church, 1 from Jehovah's Witnesses, 1 from Christian Congregations in Slovakia, 1 from Other and 1 from Ad hoc movements.

== Culture ==
The village has a public library and a football pitch.

== See also ==
- List of municipalities and towns in Michalovce District
- List of municipalities and towns in Slovakia
