= Lesné =

Lesné Leszna
- Municipality
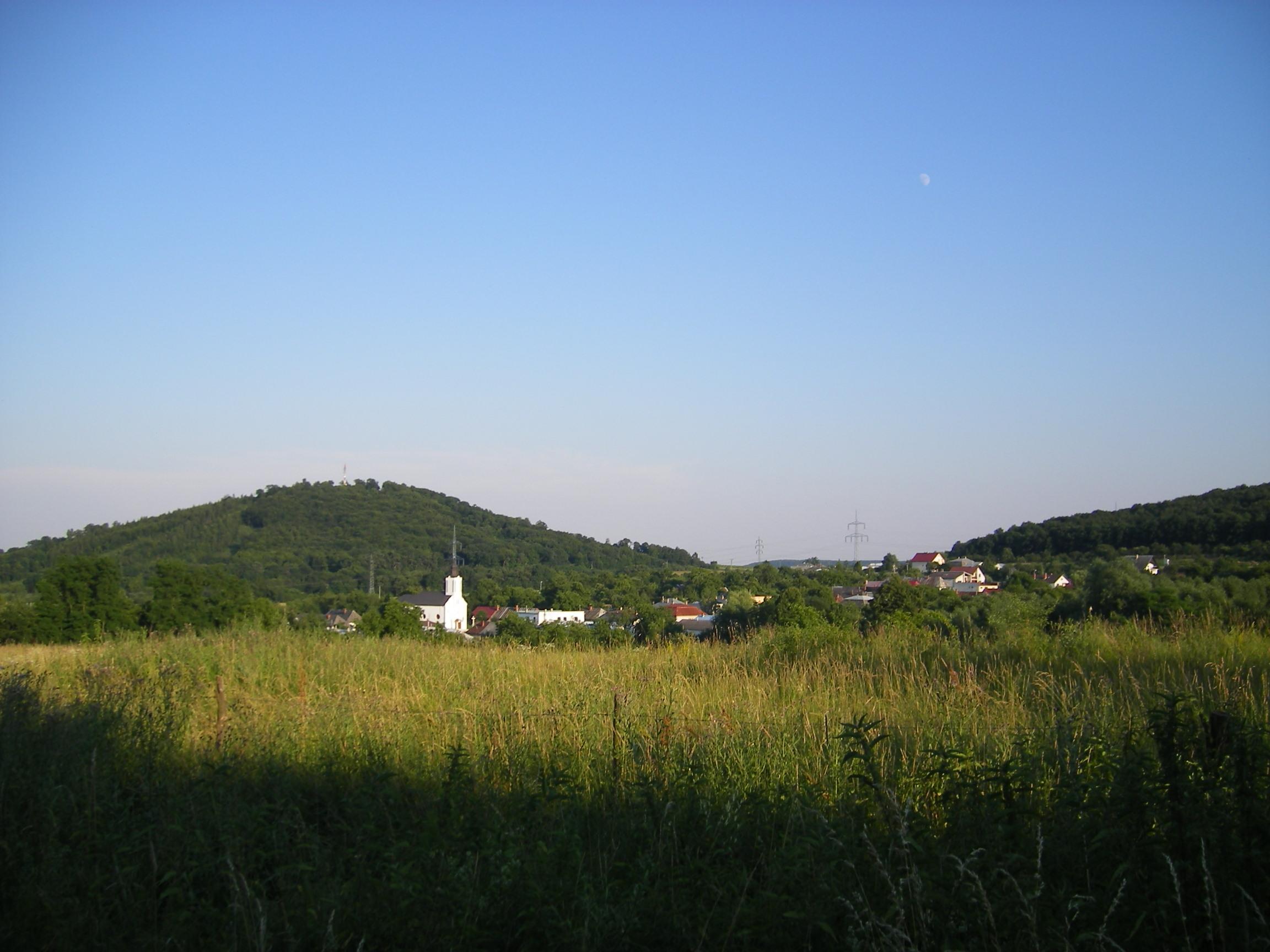

- Flag

- Location of Lesné in the Košice Region Location of Lesné in Slovakia
- Coordinates: 48.80°N 21.82°E
- Country: Slovakia
- Region: Košice Region
- District: Michalovce District
- First mentioned: 1254

Area
  - Total: 6.81 km^{2} (2.63 sq mi)
- Elevation: 141 m (463 ft)

Population (2025)
  - Total: 412
- Time zone: UTC+1 (CET)
  - Summer (DST): UTC+2 (CEST)
- Postal code: 710 1
- Area code: +421 56
- Vehicle registration plate (until 2022): MI
- Website: lesne.sk

Lesné (Hungarian: Leszna) is a village and municipality in Michalovce District in the Košice Region of eastern Slovakia.

== History ==
In historical records the village was first mentioned in 1254.

== Geography ==
The municipality lies at an altitude of 141 metres (463 ft) and covers an area of 6.81 km^{2} (2.63 sq mi) (2025).

== Population ==
Population statistic (10 years)
Year	1995	2005	2015	2025
Count	423	438	444	412
Difference		+3.54%	+1.36%	−7.20%

Population statistic
Year	2024	2025
Count	417	412
Difference		−1.19%

It has a population of 412 people (31 December 2025).

=== Ethnicity ===
Census 2021 (1+ %)
Ethnicity	Number	Fraction
Slovak	429	95.12%
Romani	33	7.31%
Not found out	18	3.99%
Ukrainian	5	1.1%
Total	451	

In year 2021 was 451 people by ethnicity 429 as Slovak, 33 as Romani, 18 as Not found out, 5 as Ukrainian, 3 as Rusyn and 2 as Hungarian.

Note on population: The difference values of population numbers in the table "Population statistic" and in the sections "Ethnicity" & "Religion" is caused by the use of various statistical methods.

=== Religion ===
Census 2021 (1+ %)
Religion	Number	Fraction
Greek Catholic Church	187	41.46%
Roman Catholic Church	176	39.02%
None	49	10.86%
Not found out	25	5.54%
Eastern Orthodox Church	7	1.55%
Total	451	

In year 2021 was 451 people by religion 187 from Greek Catholic Church, 176 from Roman Catholic Church, 49 from None, 25 from Not found out, 7 from Eastern Orthodox Church, 4 from Calvinist Church and 3 from Evangelical Church.

== Culture ==
The village has a public library and a football pitch.
