= Čečehov =

Village and municipality in Slovakia

Čečehov Zuhogó
- Municipality
- Flag

- Location of Čečehov in the Košice Region Location of Čečehov in Slovakia
- Coordinates: 48.73°N 21.98°E
- Country: Slovakia
- Region: Košice Region
- District: Michalovce District
- First mentioned: 1410

Area
  - Total: 7.61 km^{2} (2.94 sq mi)
- Elevation: 105 m (344 ft)

Population (2025)
  - Total: 386
- Time zone: UTC+1 (CET)
  - Summer (DST): UTC+2 (CEST)
- Postal code: 721 1
- Area code: +421 56
- Vehicle registration plate (until 2022): MI
- Website: cecehov.sk

Čečehov (Hungarian: Zuhogó) is a village and municipality in Michalovce District in the Kosice Region of eastern Slovakia.

== History ==
In historical records the village was first mentioned in 1410. Before the establishment of independent Czechoslovakia in 1918, it was part of Ung County within the Kingdom of Hungary.

== Geography ==
The municipality lies at an altitude of 105 metres (344 ft) and covers an area of 7.61 km^{2} (2.94 sq mi) (2025).

== Population ==
Population statistic (10 years)
Year	1995	2005	2015	2025
Count	260	347	378	386
Difference		+33.46%	+8.93%	+2.11%

Population statistic
Year	2024	2025
Count	388	386
Difference		−0.51%

It has a population of 386 people (31 December 2025).

=== Ethnicity ===
Census 2021 (1+ %)
Ethnicity	Number	Fraction
Slovak	366	95.06%
Romani	56	14.54%
Not found out	18	4.67%
Ukrainian	6	1.55%
Total	385	

In year 2021 was 385 people by ethnicity 366 as Slovak, 56 as Romani, 18 as Not found out, 6 as Ukrainian, 3 as Czech, 3 as Other and 2 as Rusyn.

Note on population: The difference values of population numbers in the table "Population statistic" and in the sections "Ethnicity" & "Religion" is caused by the use of various statistical methods.

=== Religion ===
Census 2021 (1+ %)
Religion	Number	Fraction
Roman Catholic Church	202	52.47%
Greek Catholic Church	54	14.03%
None	54	14.03%
Apostolic Church	29	7.53%
Not found out	14	3.64%
Eastern Orthodox Church	12	3.12%
Other	5	1.3%
Calvinist Church	4	1.04%
Jehovah's Witnesses	4	1.04%
Evangelical Church	4	1.04%
Total	385	

In year 2021 was 385 people by religion 202 from Roman Catholic Church, 54 from Greek Catholic Church, 54 from None, 29 from Apostolic Church, 14 from Not found out, 12 from Eastern Orthodox Church, 5 from Other, 4 from Calvinist Church, 4 from Jehovah's Witnesses, 4 from Evangelical Church, 2 from Ad hoc movements and 1 from Paganism and natural spirituality.

== Transport ==
The nearest railway station is located 10 kilometres away at Michalovce.

== Genealogical resources ==
The records for genealogical research are available at the state archive "Statny Archiv in Presov, Slovakia"

- Roman Catholic church records (births/marriages/deaths): 1824-1912 (parish B)
- Greek Catholic church records (births/marriages/deaths): 1806-1913 (parish B)
- Reformated church records (births/marriages/deaths): 1747-1940 (parish B)

== See also ==
- List of municipalities and towns in Slovakia
