= Bracovce =

Village and municipality in the Michalovce District in Slovakia

Bracovce Berettő
- Municipality
- Flag

- Location of Bracovce in the Košice Region Location of Bracovce in Slovakia
- Coordinates: 48.63°N 21.83°E
- Country: Slovakia
- Region: Košice Region
- District: Michalovce District
- First mentioned: 1227

Area
  - Total: 9.61 km^{2} (3.71 sq mi)
- Elevation: 105 m (344 ft)

Population (2025)
  - Total: 967
- Time zone: UTC+1 (CET)
  - Summer (DST): UTC+2 (CEST)
- Postal code: 720 5
- Area code: +421 56
- Vehicle registration plate (until 2022): MI
- Website: www.obecbracovce.sk

Bracovce (Hungarian: Berettő) is a village and municipality in the Michalovce District in the Košice Region of Slovakia.

== History ==
In historical records, the village was first mentioned in 1227. Before the establishment of independent Czechoslovakia in 1918, it was part of Zemplén County within the Kingdom of Hungary.

== Geography ==
The municipality lies at an altitude of 105 metres (344 ft) and covers an area of 9.61 km^{2} (3.71 sq mi) (2025).

== Population ==
Population statistic (10 years)
Year	1995	2005	2015	2025
Count	962	938	936	967
Difference		−2.49%	−0.21%	+3.31%

Population statistic
Year	2024	2025
Count	968	967
Difference		−0.10%

It has a population of 967 people (31 December 2025).

=== Ethnicity ===
Census 2021 (1+ %)
Ethnicity	Number	Fraction
Slovak	911	97.85%
Romani	18	1.93%
Not found out	12	1.28%
Total	931	

In year 2021 was 931 people by ethnicity 911 as Slovak, 18 as Romani, 12 as Not found out, 6 as Rusyn, 4 as Czech, 1 as Ukrainian, 1 as Polish, 1 as Hungarian, 1 as Other and 1 as English.

Note on population: The difference values of population numbers in the table "Population statistic" and in the sections "Ethnicity" & "Religion" is caused by the use of various statistical methods.

=== Religion ===
Census 2021 (1+ %)
Religion	Number	Fraction
Eastern Orthodox Church	276	29.65%
Roman Catholic Church	223	23.95%
Evangelical Church	144	15.47%
Greek Catholic Church	103	11.06%
Calvinist Church	91	9.77%
None	64	6.87%
Not found out	15	1.61%
Total	931	

In year 2021 was 931 people by religion 276 from Eastern Orthodox Church, 223 from Roman Catholic Church, 144 from Evangelical Church, 103 from Greek Catholic Church, 91 from Calvinist Church, 64 from None, 15 from Not found out, 6 from Church of the Brethren, 4 from Jehovah's Witnesses, 3 from Old Catholic Church, 1 from Seventh-day Adventist Church and 1 from Buddhism.

== Genealogical resources ==
The records for genealogical research are available at the state archive "Statny Archiv in Presov, Slovakia"

- Roman Catholic church records (births/marriages/deaths): 1790-1895 (parish B)
- Greek Catholic church records (births/marriages/deaths): 1786-1922 (parish B)
- Lutheran church records (births/marriages/deaths): 1783-1895 (parish B)

== See also ==
- List of municipalities and towns in Slovakia
