= Tušice =

Village and municipality in Slovakia

Tušice Tusa
- Municipality
- Flag

- Location of Tušice in the Košice Region Location of Tušice in Slovakia
- Coordinates: 48.73°N 21.75°E
- Country: Slovakia
- Region: Košice Region
- District: Michalovce District
- First mentioned: 1221

Area
  - Total: 6.23 km^{2} (2.41 sq mi)
- Elevation: 108 m (354 ft)

Population (2025)
  - Total: 658
- Time zone: UTC+1 (CET)
  - Summer (DST): UTC+2 (CEST)
- Postal code: 720 2
- Area code: +421 56
- Vehicle registration plate (until 2022): MI
- Website: obectusice.sk

Tušice (Hungarian: Tusa) is a village and municipality in Michalovce District in the Kosice Region of eastern Slovakia.

== Geography ==
The municipality lies at an altitude of 108 metres (354 ft) and covers an area of 6.23 km^{2} (2.41 sq mi) (2025).

== History ==
In historical records the village was first mentioned in 1221 as Tuka. Since the 18th century variants of Tusa and Tussa has been recorded.

== Population ==
Population statistic (10 years)
Year	1995	2005	2015	2025
Count	667	697	691	658
Difference		+4.49%	−0.86%	−4.77%

Population statistic
Year	2024	2025
Count	667	658
Difference		−1.34%

It has a population of 658 people (31 December 2025).

=== Ethnicity ===
Census 2021 (1+ %)
Ethnicity	Number	Fraction
Slovak	650	97.3%
Romani	28	4.19%
Not found out	12	1.79%
Total	668	

In year 2021 was 668 people by ethnicity 650 as Slovak, 28 as Romani, 12 as Not found out, 2 as Hungarian, 1 as Czech, 1 as Italian and 1 as Rusyn.

Note on population: The difference values of population numbers in the table "Population statistic" and in the sections "Ethnicity" & "Religion" is caused by the use of various statistical methods.

=== Religion ===
Census 2021 (1+ %)
Religion	Number	Fraction
Roman Catholic Church	227	33.98%
Calvinist Church	205	30.69%
Greek Catholic Church	72	10.78%
None	70	10.48%
Jehovah's Witnesses	40	5.99%
Evangelical Church	33	4.94%
Not found out	11	1.65%
Eastern Orthodox Church	9	1.35%
Total	668	

In year 2021 was 668 people by religion 227 from Roman Catholic Church, 205 from Calvinist Church, 72 from Greek Catholic Church, 70 from None, 40 from Jehovah's Witnesses, 33 from Evangelical Church, 11 from Not found out, 9 from Eastern Orthodox Church and 1 from Ad hoc movements.
