= Oreské, Michalovce District =

Oreské Ordasfalva
- Municipality
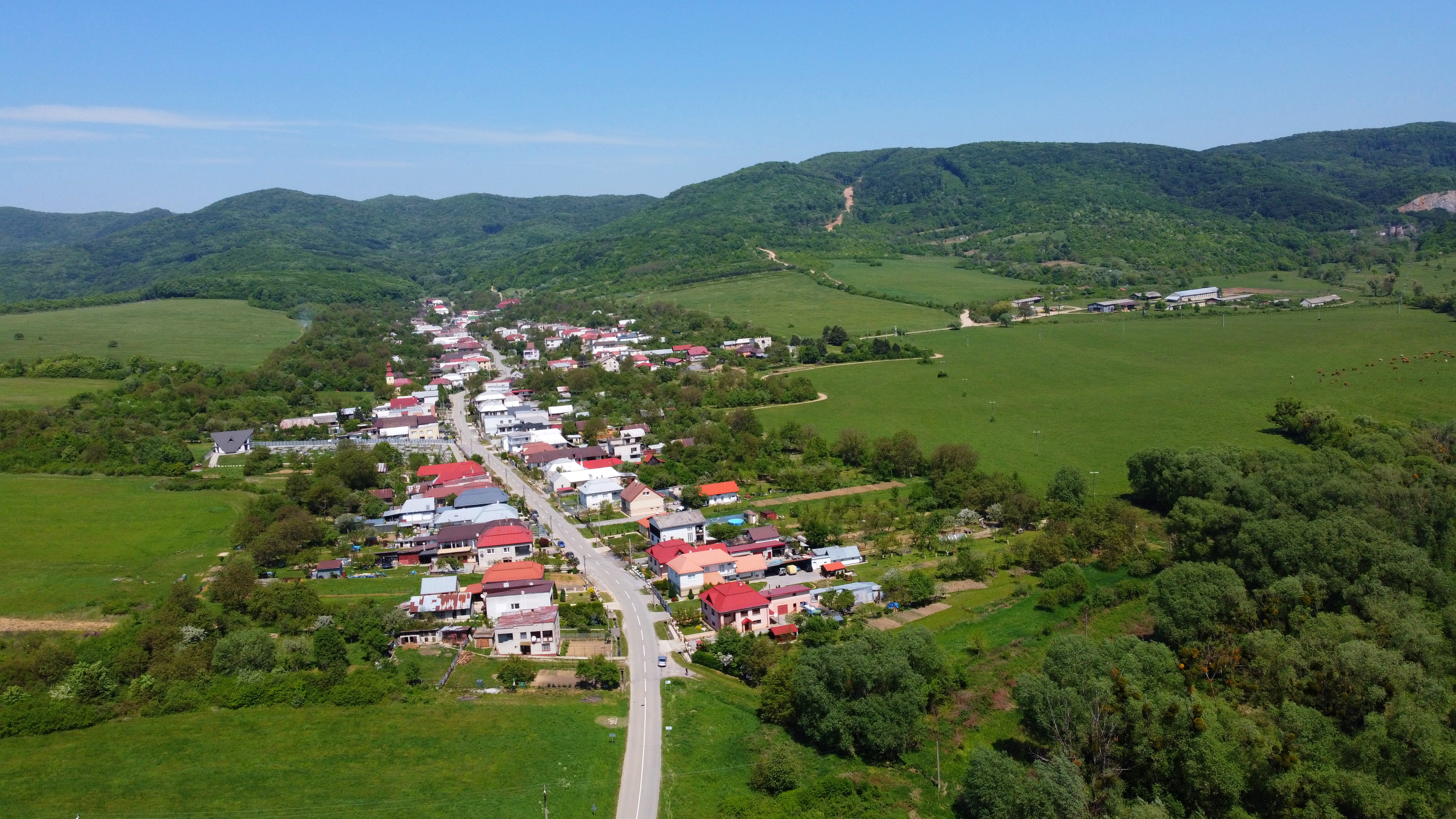

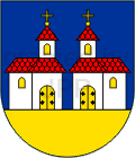
- Flag Coat of arms

- Location of Oreské in the Košice Region Location of Oreské in Slovakia
- Coordinates: 48.86°N 21.90°E
- Country: Slovakia
- Region: Košice Region
- District: Michalovce District
- First mentioned: 1358

Area
  - Total: 11.12 km^{2} (4.29 sq mi)
- Elevation: 169 m (554 ft)

Population (2025)
  - Total: 481
- Time zone: UTC+1 (CET)
  - Summer (DST): UTC+2 (CEST)
- Postal code: 722 3
- Area code: +421 56
- Vehicle registration plate (until 2022): MI
- Website: obecoreske.sk

Oreské (Hungarian: Ordasfalva) is a village and municipality in Michalovce District in the Kosice Region of eastern Slovakia.

== History ==
In historical records the village was first mentioned in 1358.

== Geography ==
The municipality lies at an altitude of 169 metres (554 ft) and covers an area of 11.12 km^{2} (4.29 sq mi) (2025).

== Population ==
Population statistic (10 years)
Year	1995	2005	2015	2025
Count	518	499	473	481
Difference		−3.66%	−5.21%	+1.69%

Population statistic
Year	2024	2025
Count	474	481
Difference		+1.47%

It has a population of 481 people (31 December 2025).

=== Ethnicity ===
Census 2021 (1+ %)
Ethnicity	Number	Fraction
Slovak	479	97.35%
Not found out	9	1.82%
Total	492	

In year 2021 was 492 people by ethnicity 479 as Slovak, 9 as Not found out, 2 as Czech, 1 as Rusyn, 1 as Polish, 1 as Hungarian, 1 as Other and 1 as Bulgarian.

Note on population: The difference values of population numbers in the table "Population statistic" and in the sections "Ethnicity" & "Religion" is caused by the use of various statistical methods.

=== Religion ===
Census 2021 (1+ %)
Religion	Number	Fraction
Roman Catholic Church	325	66.06%
Greek Catholic Church	124	25.2%
None	28	5.69%
Not found out	10	2.03%
Total	492	

In year 2021 was 492 people by religion 325 from Roman Catholic Church, 124 from Greek Catholic Church, 28 from None, 10 from Not found out, 3 from Calvinist Church, 1 from Eastern Orthodox Church and 1 from Evangelical Church.

== Culture ==
The village has a public library and a football pitch.
