= Zemplínske Kopčany =

Zemplínske Kopčany Hegyi
- Municipality
- Flag

- Location of Zemplínske Kopčany in the Košice Region Location of Zemplínske Kopčany in Slovakia
- Coordinates: 48.59°N 21.92°E
- Country: Slovakia
- Region: Košice Region
- District: Michalovce District
- First mentioned: 1332

Area
  - Total: 9.66 km^{2} (3.73 sq mi)
- Elevation: 104 m (341 ft)

Population (2025)
  - Total: 531
- Time zone: UTC+1 (CET)
  - Summer (DST): UTC+2 (CEST)
- Postal code: 721 7
- Area code: +421 56
- Vehicle registration plate (until 2022): MI
- Website: www.zemplinskekopcany.sk

Zemplínske Kopčany (Slovak pronunciation: [ˈzempliːnske ˈkɔptʂani]; Hungarian: Hegyi) is a village and municipality in Michalovce District in the Kosice Region of eastern Slovakia.

== History ==
In historical records the village was first mentioned in 1288.

== Geography ==
The municipality lies at an altitude of 104 metres (341 ft) and covers an area of 9.66 km^{2} (3.73 sq mi) (2025).

== Population ==
Population statistic (10 years)
Year	1995	2005	2015	2025
Count	211	247	447	531
Difference		+17.06%	+80.97%	+18.79%

Population statistic
Year	2024	2025
Count	515	531
Difference		+3.10%

It has a population of 531 people (31 December 2025).

=== Ethnicity ===
Census 2021 (1+ %)
Ethnicity	Number	Fraction
Slovak	427	87.86%
Hungarian	54	11.11%
Romani	31	6.37%
Not found out	16	3.29%
Total	486	

In year 2021 was 486 people by ethnicity 427 as Slovak, 54 as Hungarian, 31 as Romani, 16 as Not found out, 1 as Polish and 1 as Other.

Note on population: The difference values of population numbers in the table "Population statistic" and in the sections "Ethnicity" & "Religion" is caused by the use of various statistical methods.

=== Religion ===
Census 2021 (1+ %)
Religion	Number	Fraction
Roman Catholic Church	281	57.82%
Greek Catholic Church	122	25.1%
None	43	8.85%
Calvinist Church	17	3.5%
Not found out	16	3.29%
Evangelical Church	5	1.03%
Total	486	

In year 2021 was 486 people by religion 281 from Roman Catholic Church, 122 from Greek Catholic Church, 43 from None, 17 from Calvinist Church, 16 from Not found out, 5 from Evangelical Church, 1 from Eastern Orthodox Church and 1 from Christian Congregations in Slovakia.

== See also ==
- List of municipalities and towns in Michalovce District
- List of municipalities and towns in Slovakia
