= Slavkovce, Slovakia =

Village in Kosice Region, Slovakia

Slavkovce Szalók
- Municipality
- Flag

- Location of Slavkovce in the Košice Region Location of Slavkovce in Slovakia
- Coordinates: 48.60°N 21.92°E
- Country: Slovakia
- Region: Košice Region
- District: Michalovce District
- First mentioned: 1315

Area
  - Total: 9.18 km^{2} (3.54 sq mi)
- Elevation: 101 m (331 ft)

Population (2025)
  - Total: 734
- Time zone: UTC+1 (CET)
  - Summer (DST): UTC+2 (CEST)
- Postal code: 721 7
- Area code: +421 56
- Vehicle registration plate (until 2022): MI
- Website: obecslavkovce.sk

Slavkovce (Hungarian: Szalók) is a village and municipality in Michalovce District in the Kosice Region of eastern Slovakia.

== History ==
In historical records the village was first mentioned in 1315.

== Geography ==
The municipality lies at an altitude of 101 metres (331 ft) and covers an area of 9.18 km^{2} (3.54 sq mi) (2025).

== Population ==
Population statistic (10 years)
Year	1995	2005	2015	2025
Count	542	620	673	734
Difference		+14.39%	+8.54%	+9.06%

Population statistic
Year	2024	2025
Count	739	734
Difference		−0.67%

It has a population of 734 people (31 December 2025).

=== Ethnicity ===
Census 2021 (1+ %)
Ethnicity	Number	Fraction
Slovak	651	92.34%
Not found out	34	4.82%
Romani	30	4.25%
Ukrainian	17	2.41%
Total	705	

In year 2021 was 705 people by ethnicity 651 as Slovak, 34 as Not found out, 30 as Romani, 17 as Ukrainian, 7 as Czech, 4 as Rusyn, 4 as Hungarian, 3 as Russian and 1 as French.

Note on population: The difference values of population numbers in the table "Population statistic" and in the sections "Ethnicity" & "Religion" is caused by the use of various statistical methods.

=== Religion ===
Census 2021 (1+ %)
Religion	Number	Fraction
Roman Catholic Church	317	44.96%
Greek Catholic Church	127	18.01%
None	54	7.66%
United Methodist Church	46	6.52%
Eastern Orthodox Church	36	5.11%
Christian Congregations in Slovakia	31	4.4%
Not found out	30	4.26%
Calvinist Church	29	4.11%
Apostolic Church	24	3.4%
Total	705	

In year 2021 was 705 people by religion 317 from Roman Catholic Church, 127 from Greek Catholic Church, 54 from None, 46 from United Methodist Church, 36 from Eastern Orthodox Church, 31 from Christian Congregations in Slovakia, 30 from Not found out, 29 from Calvinist Church, 24 from Apostolic Church, 5 from Evangelical Church, 3 from Jehovah's Witnesses, 1 from Paganism and natural spirituality, 1 from Other and not ascertained christian church and 1 from Other.
