= Vala =

Vala or VALA may refer to:

== Religion and mythology ==
- Vala (Vedic), a demon or a stone cavern in the Hindu scriptures
- Völva, also spelled Vala, a priestess in Norse mythology and Norse paganism

== Fiction ==
- Vala (Middle-earth), an angelic being in J. R. R. Tolkien's fiction
- Vala Mal Doran, a fictional character in the Canadian-American television series Stargate SG-1
- Vala (Blake), a character in the mythological writings of William Blake
- Vala, or The Four Zoas, a poem by Blake

== People ==
- Vala (clan), a Rajput clan found in Gujarat in India

=== Surname ===
- Aleš Vála (born 1973), a Czech ice hockey player
- Asad Vala (born 1987), a Papua New Guinean cricketer
- Jessie Rose Vala (born 1977), an American artist
- Jorge Vala (born 1984), a Portuguese academic
- Katri Vala (1901–1944), a Finnish poet
- Lobat Vala (born 1930), an Iranian poet and activist
- Numonius Vala, a Roman family name, or any of the men of that name
- Vajubhai Vala, an Indian politician

=== Given name ===
- Vala Flosadóttir (born 1978), an Icelandic former pole vaulter
- Vala Chakradhar Rao (1928–1991), an Indian doctor and politician

== Places ==
- Vala State, a former Indian princely state during the British Raj
- Våla Hundred, see List of hundreds of Sweden
- 131 Vala, an asteroid discovered in 1873 named after Völva

== Other uses ==
- Vala (programming language), a programming language targeting GNOME's object system
- VALA, Libraries, Technology and the Future Inc., an Australian not-for-profit organisation
- Vala GSM, a mobile operator in Kosovo
- Vala halt, a closed railway station in the municipality of Silves, Portugal
- BAW Vala, an electric camper van

== See also ==
- Wala (disambiguation)
- Val (disambiguation)
- Valan (disambiguation)
- Valo (disambiguation)
- Vola (disambiguation)
- Volo (disambiguation)
- Valar (disambiguation)
- Vela (disambiguation)
- Velar (caste), a caste in the Indian state of Tamil Nadu
