= Velan =

Velan or Vélan may refer to:

== Places ==
- Velan, Albania, a settlement
- Dent du Vélan, a peak in the Chablais Alps, Switzerland
- Mont Vélan, a mountain of the Pennine Alps, on the border between Switzerland and Italy
- Petit Vélan, a mountain of the Swiss Pennine Alps

== People ==
- Chris Velan, Canadian singer-songwriter
- Isari Velan, Indian actor and politician
- Yves Velan (1925–2017), Swiss writer

== Other uses ==
- Kartikeya, or Vēlaṇ, a Hindu deity
- Velan (film), a 2021 Indian Tamil-language film
- Velan Studios, an American video game developer
- Velan, a character in the 2011 Indian film Osthe

== See also ==
- Valan (disambiguation)
- Valen (disambiguation)
- Vela (disambiguation)
- Velar (disambiguation)
- Velar (caste), a caste in the Indian state of Tamil Nadu
- Velanne, France, a commune
