= Vilar =

Vilar may refer to:

== People ==
- Vilar (surname)

== Places in Portugal ==
- Vilar (Boticas), a parish in the municipality of Boticas
- Vilar (Cadaval), a parish in the municipality of Cadaval
- Vilar (Moimenta da Beira), a parish in the municipality of Moimenta da Beira
- Vilar (Terras de Bouro), a parish in the municipality of Terras de Bouro
- Vilar (Vila do Conde), a parish in the municipality of Vila do Conde
- Areias de Vilar, a parish in the municipality of Barcelos
- Vilar Barroco, a parish in the municipality of Oleiros
- Vilar da Veiga, a parish in the municipality of Alfândega da Fé
- Vilar das Almas, a parish in the municipality of Vieira do Minho
- Vilar de Amargo, a parish in the municipality of Terras de Bouro
- Vilar de Andorinho, a parish in the municipality of Ponte de Lima
- Vilar de Besteiros, a parish in the municipality of Figueira de Castelo Rodrigo
- Vilar Chão (Alfândega da Fé), a parish in the municipality of Vila Nova de Gaia
- Vilar Chão (Vieira do Minho), a parish in the municipality of Tondela
- Vilar de Cunhas, a parish in the municipality of Cabeceiras de Basto
- Vilar de Ferreiros, a parish in the municipality of Mondim de Basto
- Vilar de Figos, a parish in the municipality of Barcelos
- Vilar de Lomba, a parish in the municipality of Vinhais
- Vilar de Maçada, a parish in the municipality of Alijó
- Vilar de Mouros, a parish in the municipality of Caminha
- Vilar de Murteda, a parish in Viana do Castelo Municipality
- Vilar de Ossos, a parish in the municipality of Vinhais
- Vilar de Perdizes, a parish in the municipality of Montalegre
- Vilar de Peregrinos, a parish in the municipality of Vinhais
- Vilar de Pinheiro, a parish in the municipality of Vila do Conde
- Vilar de Rei, a parish in the municipality of Mogadouro
- Vilar do Monte (Barcelos), a parish in the municipality of Barcelos
- Vilar do Monte (Macedo de Cavaleiros), a parish in the municipality of Macedo de Cavaleiros
- Vilar do Monte (Ponte de Lima), a parish in the municipality of Ponte de Lima
- Vilar do Paraíso, a parish in the municipality of Vila Nova de Gaia
- Vilar do Torno e Alentém, a parish in the municipality of Lousada
- Vilar Formoso, a parish in the municipality of Almeida
- Vilar Maior, a parish in the municipality of Sabugal
- Vilar Seco (Nelas), a parish in the municipality of Nelas
- Vilar Seco (Vimioso), a parish in the municipality of Vimioso
- Vilar Seco de Lomba, a parish in the municipality of Vinhais
- Vilar Torpim, a parish in the municipality of Figueira de Castelo Rodrigo

== Places in India ==
- Vilar, Thanjavur, a panchayat town in Tamil Nadu

== Other ==
- VILAR Botanical Garden (Moscow)

== See also ==
- Vilarinho (disambiguation)
- Velar (disambiguation)
