= Velar =

Velar may refer to:

- Velar consonant
- Velar vowels, more commonly referred to as back vowels
- Velar veins, or internal cerebral veins
- Velar, Rajasthan, a village in India
- Velar (caste), a caste in the Indian state of Tamil Nadu
- Range Rover Velar, a make of car
- Nathan Thomas Velar (1858–1928), African American elected official, postmaster

== See also ==
- Vellalar (disambiguation)
- Valar (disambiguation), a race of godlike beings in Tolkien's legendarium
- Velan (disambiguation)
- Vela (disambiguation)
- Vilar (disambiguation)
