= Vela =

Vela or Velas may refer to:

== Astronomy ==
- Vela (constellation), a constellation in the southern sky (the Sails)
  - Vela (Chinese astronomy)
  - Vela Pulsar
  - Vela X-1, a pulsing, eclipsing high-mass X-ray binary system

== Places ==
- Vela Bluff, Antarctica
- Vela, Dolj, Romania
- Vela (Ilidža – Sarajevo), Bosnia and Herzegovina
- Velas, Maharashtra, India

== Ships ==
- CMA CGM Vela, a container ship in service since 2008
- USNS Vela (T-AK-89), US Army port repair ship
- Vela-class submarine, of the Indian Navy
  - INS Vela (S40), in service 1973–2010

== Technology ==
- Project Vela, a system developed by the United States to monitor compliance with the Partial Test Ban Treaty
  - Vela (satellite), a series of satellites launched by the United States to monitor nuclear testing
    - Vela incident, an international incident, in which a Vela satellite is thought to possibly have observed a nuclear test
- Versatile Laboratory Aid (VELA), a data logging tool used in education

== People ==
=== Given name ===
- Vela Jiménez (fl. 882–883), Count of Álava
- Vela Ladrón (fl. 1136–1174), Spanish nobleman
- Vela Manusaute, Niuean writer and director
- Vela Ovéquiz (fl. 1065–1085), count in the Kingdom of Galicia
- Vela Peeva (1922–1944), Bulgarian partisan
- Vela Velupillai (born 1947), Sri Lankan-American economist

=== Surname ===
- Alejandro Vela (born 1984), Mexican footballer
- Alexandra Vela, Ecuadorian lawyer and politician
- Alicia Vela-Bailey (born 1982), American stunt performer, stunt double, actress, dancer, and choreographer
- Arqueles Vela (1899–1977), Guatemalan-Mexican writer, journalist, and teacher
- Blanca Vela (1936–2014), American politician
- Blasco Núñez Vela (1490–1546), viceroy of Peru
- Carlos Vela (born 1989), Mexican footballer
- Carmen Vela (born 1955), Spanish entrepreneur, researcher, and cabinet minister
- Cindy Vela (born 1979), American actress, model, and saxophonist
- Cristóbal Vela (1588–1654), Spanish Baroque painter and gilder
- Ernesto Vela (born 1968), Mexican Olympic swimmer
- Filemon Vela, Jr. (born 1963), American lawyer and politician
- Filemon Vela, Sr. (1935–2004), United States federal judge
- Giuseppe Vela Júnior (born 1977), Brazilian footballer
- Gonzalo Vázquez Vela (1893–1963), Mexican politician
- José Manuel Vela Bargues (1962–2022), Spanish economist and politician
- Josh Vela (born 1993), English footballer
- Lucé Vela, First Lady of Puerto Rico from 2009 to 2013
- Marco Alonso Vela (born 1961), Mexican politician
- Moises Vela, American lawyer and government advisor
- Nallely Vela (born 1986), Mexican sprinter
- Norma Safford Vela, American television writer, director, and producer
- Orlando Vela (born 1994), Mexican footballer
- Rafael Cárdenas Vela, Mexican drug cartel leader
- Ricky Vela, American songwriter and keyboardist
- Rodolfo Neri Vela (born 1952), Mexican scientist and astronaut
- Rosie Vela (born 1954), American model and singer-songwriter
- Sergio Vela (born 1964), Mexican-American opera director
- Spartaco Vela (1853–1895), Italian painter, son of Vincenzo Vela
- Vincenzo Vela (1820–1891), Swiss-Italian sculptor

== Other uses ==
- Nemmara Vallangi Vela, an annual festival of a village called Nemmara in South India
- Vela International Marine, a subsidiary of Saudi Aramco
- Vela, a playable character in the video game Jet Force Gemini
- Vela, a religious, cultural celebration from the city of Tehuantepec, Mexico
- Vela, an alternative appellation for Mokosh, the consort of the Slavic god of thunder
- Vela, a genus of land crabs in the family Gecarcinucidae
- Vela (film), a 2023 Indian crime drama

== See also ==
- Vella (disambiguation)
- Velan (disambiguation)
- Vala (disambiguation)
- Velar (disambiguation)
- Velar (caste), a caste in the Indian state of Tamil Nadu
- Velas, Azores
- Velada, Spain
