= Valo =

Valo may refer to:

== Surname ==
- Elmer Valo (1921–1998), American baseball player
- Jesse Valo (born 1984), Finnish kickboxer and musician, former member of Iconcrash
- Ville Valo (born 1976), Finnish musician

== Music ==
- Valo, a 1996 album by Essi Wuorela
- Valo, a 2000 album by Yö
- Valo, a 2013 album by Sakari Kukko

== Other ==
- VALO-CD, a distribution of open-source software on a CD for Microsoft Windows
- Adelaide 500 also known as Clipsal 500; a race in Adelaide

== See also ==
- Vallo (disambiguation)
- Valor (disambiguation)
- Valon
- Val (disambiguation)
- Vola (disambiguation)
- Volo (disambiguation)
- Vala (disambiguation)
