= Vella =

Vella may refer to:

== Places ==
- Vella, Burkina Faso, a town in central Burkina Faso
- Vella Flat, a coastal flat in Antarctica
- Vella Gulf, a waterway in the Western Province of the Solomon Islands
  - location of the Battle of Vella Gulf, 1943
- Vella, Switzerland, a municipality

== Other uses ==
- Vella (insect), a genus of insects
- Vella (plant), a genus of plants
- Vella (surname)

== See also ==
- Vella Lavella, an island in the Western Province of the Solomon Islands, giving its name to:
  - Land Battle of Vella Lavella, 1943
  - Naval Battle of Vella Lavella, 1943
- Vela (disambiguation)
