= Valan (disambiguation) =

Valan may refer to:

- Valan, an Indian name

== People ==
- Merlyn Orville Valan (1926-2010), American farmer and politician

== Places ==
- Valan, Nordkapp, a village in Nordkapp Municipality, Finnmark county, Norway
- Valan Airport, or Honningsvåg Airport, Valan, an airport in Finnmark county, Norway
- Valan, Troms, a village in Kvænangen Municipality, Troms county, Norway
- Valan, Iran, a village in Sistan and Baluchestan Province, Iran

== See also ==
- Valen (disambiguation), a similarly spelled name
- Vala (disambiguation)
- Velar (caste), a caste in the Indian state of Tamil Nadu
