= Vallo =

Vallo (also as Vallø) may refer to:

== People ==
Given name

- Vallo Allingu, Estonian basketball player
- Vallo Kirs, Estonian actor
- Vallo Reimaa, Estonian politician

Surname

- Ambra Vallo, Italian ballet dancer
- James Vallo, American actor and film producer

== Places ==
Italy

- Vallo della Lucania, a municipality in the Province of Salerno, Campania
- Vallo di Diano, a geographical region of the Province of Salerno, Campania
- Vallo di Nera, a municipality in the Province of Perugia, Umbria
- Vallo Torinese, a municipality in the Province of Turin, Piedmont
- Mazara del Vallo, a municipality in the Province of Trapani, Sicily
- Pago del Vallo di Lauro, a municipality in the Province of Avellino, Campania
- San Lorenzo del Vallo, a municipality in the Province of Cosenza, Calabria

Denmark

- Vallø, a former municipality of Region Sjælland

Norway

- Vallø (Tønsberg), a village part of the municipality of Tønsberg, Vestfold county

== See also ==
- Vallum (disambiguation)
- Valo (disambiguation)
