= Valar (disambiguation) =

The Valar are characters in J. R. R. Tolkien's Middle Earth legendarium.

Valar may also refer to:

- Valár, a village in Romania
- Valar Ventures, a venture fund
- Valär, a surname: see Category:Van Leer family

== See also ==
- Velar (disambiguation)
- Vala (disambiguation)
- Velar (caste), a caste in the Indian state of Tamil Nadu
