= Vellalar (disambiguation) =

Vellala or Vellalar may refer to:

- Vellala, a village in Andhra Pradesh, India
- Vellalar, a caste originating in Tamil Nadu, India
  - Sri Lankan Tamil Vellalar, the dominant caste of Sri Lankan Tamils
  - List of Vellalar sub castes, a list of sub castes
- Isai Vellalar, a new identity for Tamil classical dance and music community created after the merger of minstrel people from certain Tamil castes

== See also ==
- Velar (disambiguation)
- Vallalar, Hindu saint
- Vellalar College for Women, women's general degree college in Thindal, Tamil Nadu, India
- Velir, former minor ruling dynasties of southern India
