= Valens (disambiguation) =

Valens was a Roman emperor (364–378).

Valens may also refer to:

- Valens (usurper), probably Iulius Valens Licinianus, usurper (250) under emperor Decius
- Valerius Valens, Roman emperor (316–317) co-emperor of Licinius
- Valens, Ontario, a hamlet within Hamilton, Ontario, Canada
- Valens, Switzerland, a resort in the canton of St. Gallen
- Valens Semiconductor, an Israeli semiconductor company producing chips for the HDBaseT video standard
- Valens, a protagonist in Gladius

== People with the name ==
- Fabius Valens, Roman general under Emperor Nero (died 69)
- Vettius Valens, astrologer (died c. 175)
- Valens Thessalonicus, usurper under Emperor Gallienus (261)
- Valens of Mursa (4th century AD), was bishop of Mursa (Osijek in modern Croatia) and a supporter of Homoian (semi-arianism) theology
- Valens Acidalius (1567–1595), was a German critic and poet
- Valens Comyn (1688–1751), was an English merchant and administrator and politician
- Valens Muhakwa, Rwandan politician
- Ritchie Valens (1941–1959), American rock music pioneer
- Chloe Valens, a character in Tales of Legendia

== See also ==
- Vale (disambiguation)
- Valen (disambiguation)
