= Velar, Rajasthan =

Velar
- Village
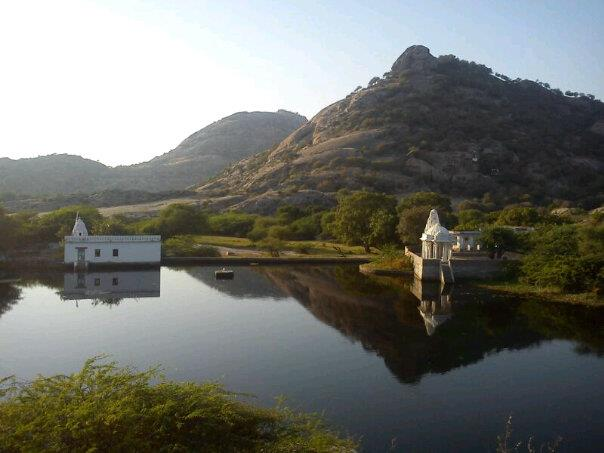
- Velar Lake

- Location in Rajasthan, India Velar (India)
- Coordinates: 24.9561°N 73.100539°E
- Country: India
- State: Rajasthan
- District: Pali
- Talukas: Bali, India

Government
  - Body: Gram Panchayat
- Elevation: 362 m (1,188 ft)

Languages
  - Official: Hindi, Marwari
- Time zone: UTC+5:30 (IST)
- PIN: 306504
- Telephone code: 02933
- Vehicle registration: RJ-22
- Lok Sabha constituency: Pali (Lok Sabha Constituency)
- Vidhan Sabha constituency: Bali, India
- Civic agency: Gram Panchayat
- Avg. annual temperature: 30 °C (86 °F)
- Avg. summer temperature: 44 °C (111 °F)
- Avg. winter temperature: 05 °C (41 °F)

Velar is a medium-sized village located in Badi tehsil of Pali district of Rajasthan in India. As of 2024, the population was recorded to be at 1,211 with the male being at 647 while the female population was at 564. It is attached to the western railway. The nearest station is Nana (6 km).

The village is administered by Sarpanch (village head), in accordance to the constitution of India and the Panchyati Raaj Act.

Velar has a history dating back to more than a thousand years and hosts many temples. The village is very old. It has existed for the last 1200 years. People say that it was in existence at the time of the ruler Prithiviraj Chouhan i.e. (1166-1192 AD).

The temple of Jalerii Mataji i.e. goddess of water, is very famous in this area. If any unmarried girl comes into the range of this God at any time, then it is necessary for that girl to come for the worship of Goddess Jaleri Mataji after the birth of her first child. There is also one very old temple of Shivji, which is called Navtirth, and another old temple dedicated to Devi Choudra Mataji. The village is named after the Goddess Vara Mataji. There is a very old Jain temple of Lord Adinath. This was built by the Jain community before 1750-1800 AD. Currently, no Jain resides in the village.

There is only one school in the village up to 8 standard and after 8 students go to nearby village which is 3 km from Velar.

There are many castes in this village, such as Rajput, Suthars, meghwals, meena, bhil, Rawals, Malis, Nais, Dewasis, and Vaishnaws. The majority of the villagers are farmers, and some have migrated to other cities like Mumbai, Ahmedabad, Delhi and Vadodara,

== Gallery ==
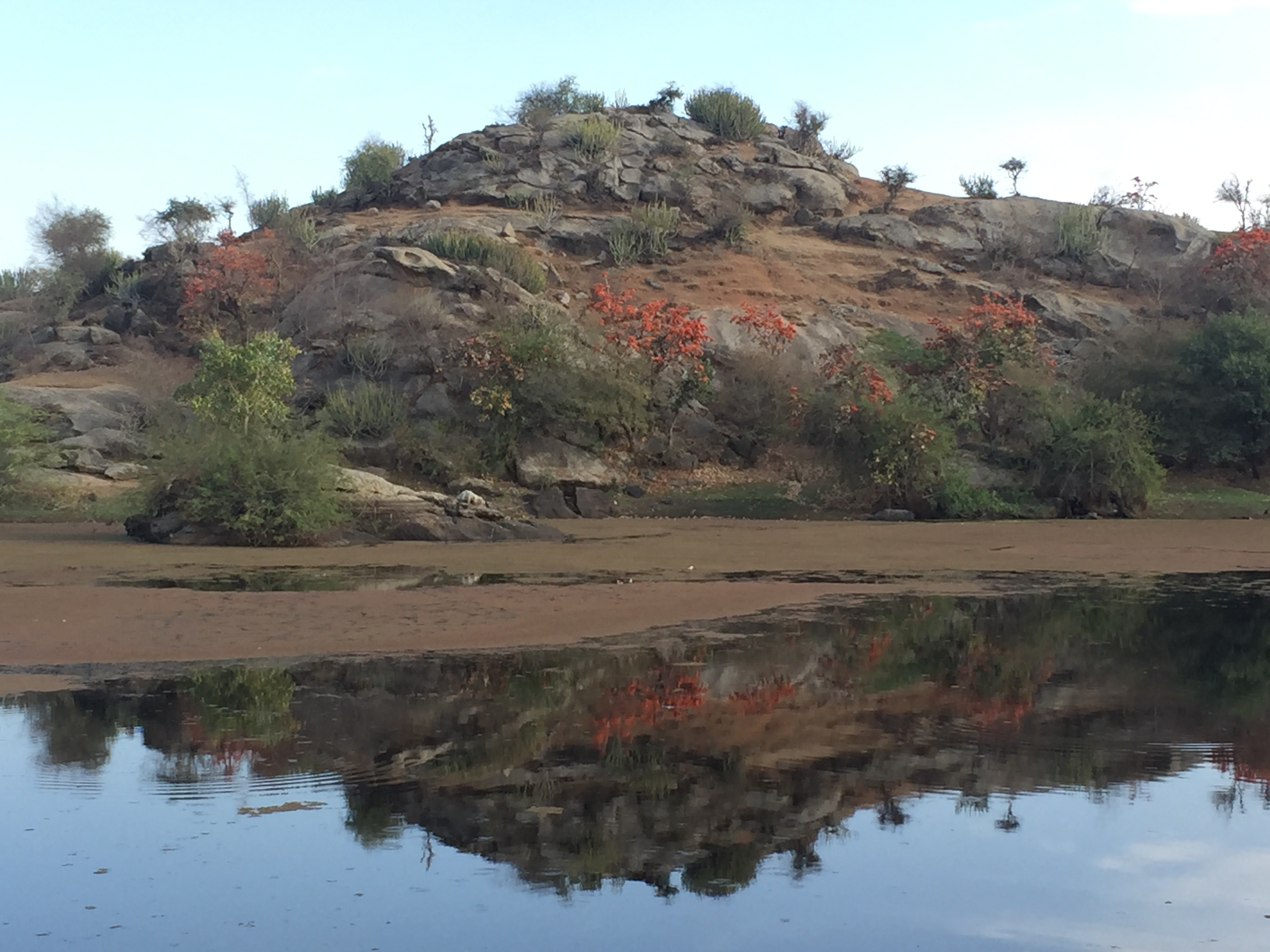

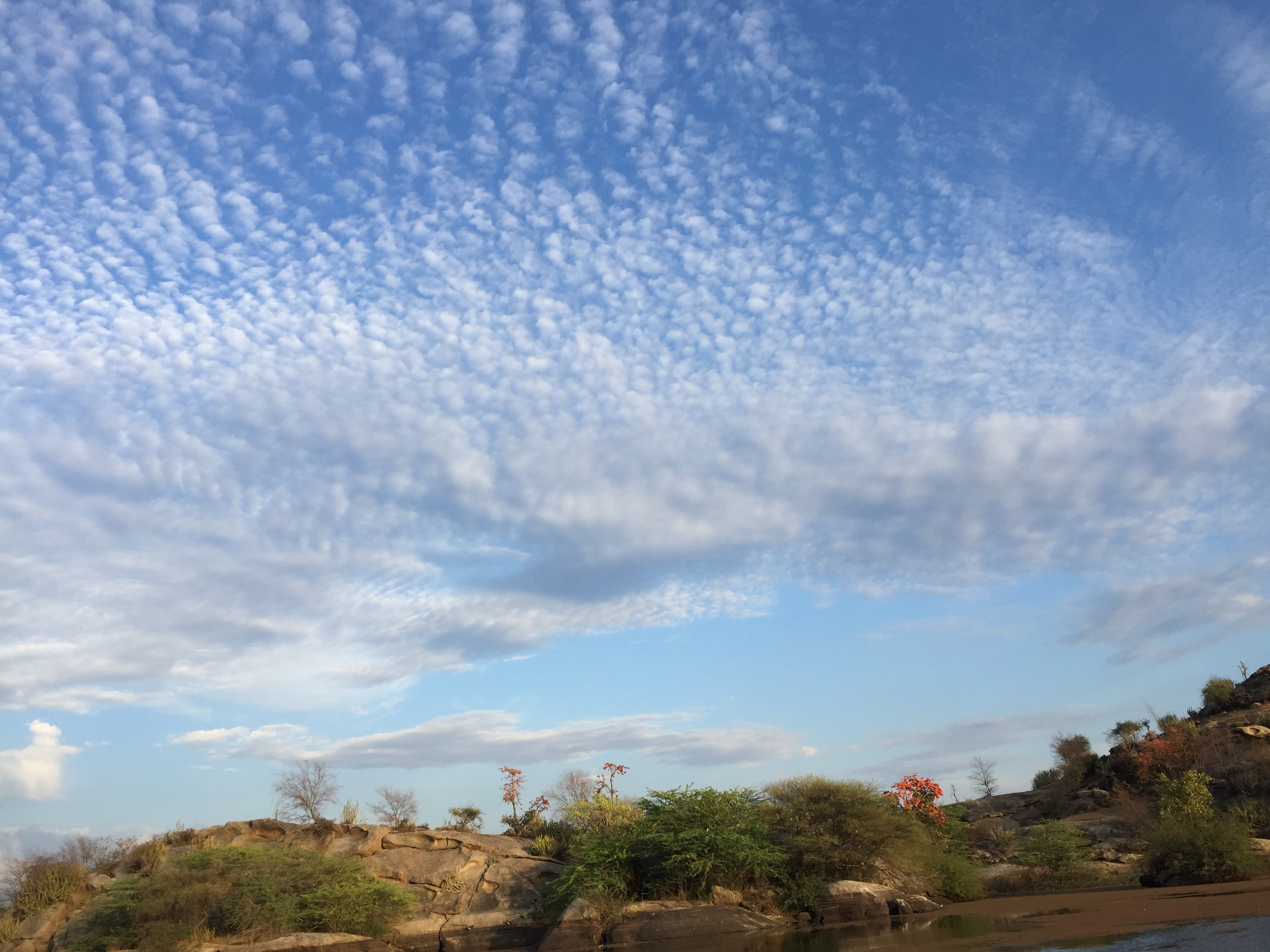

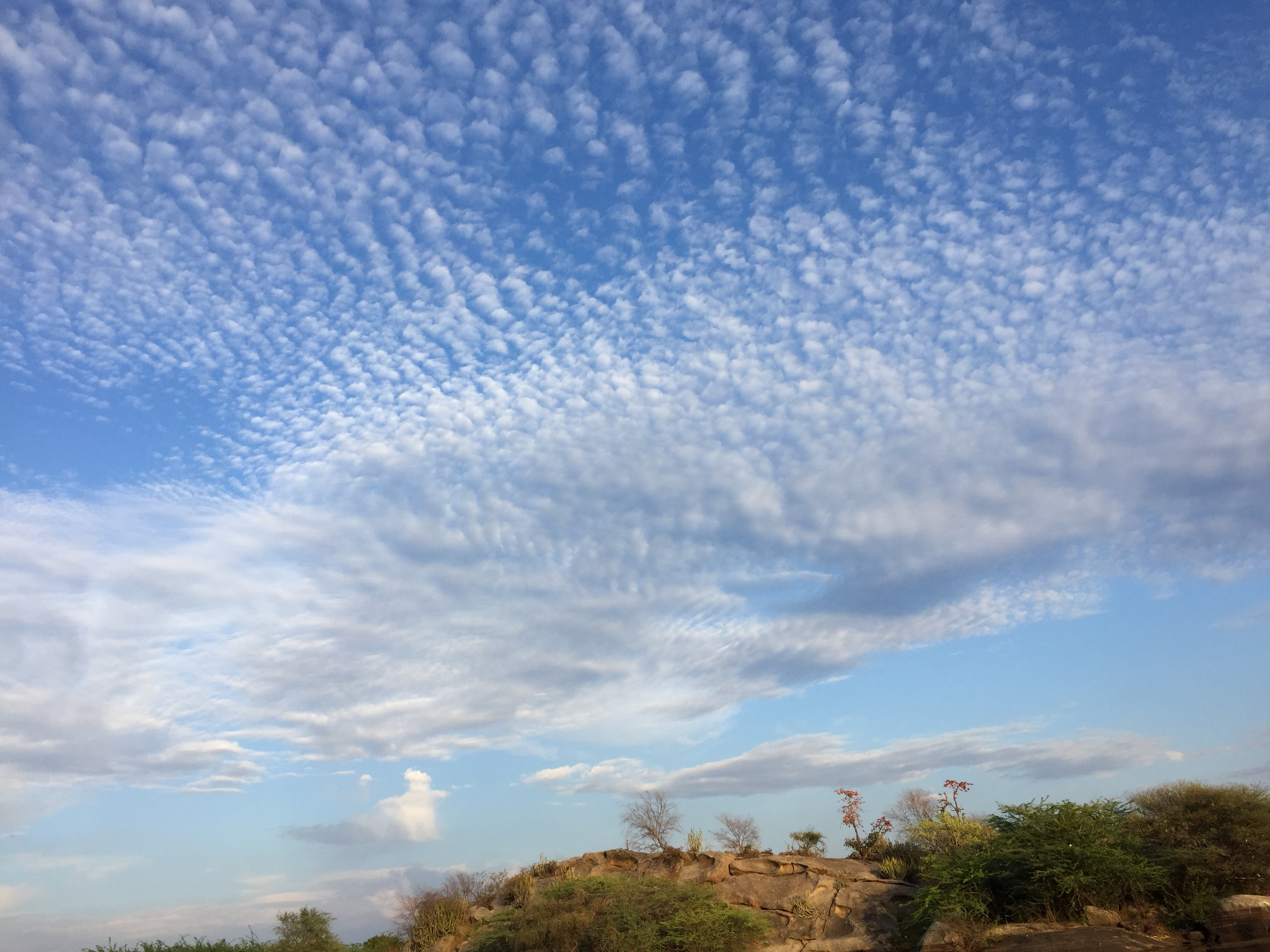

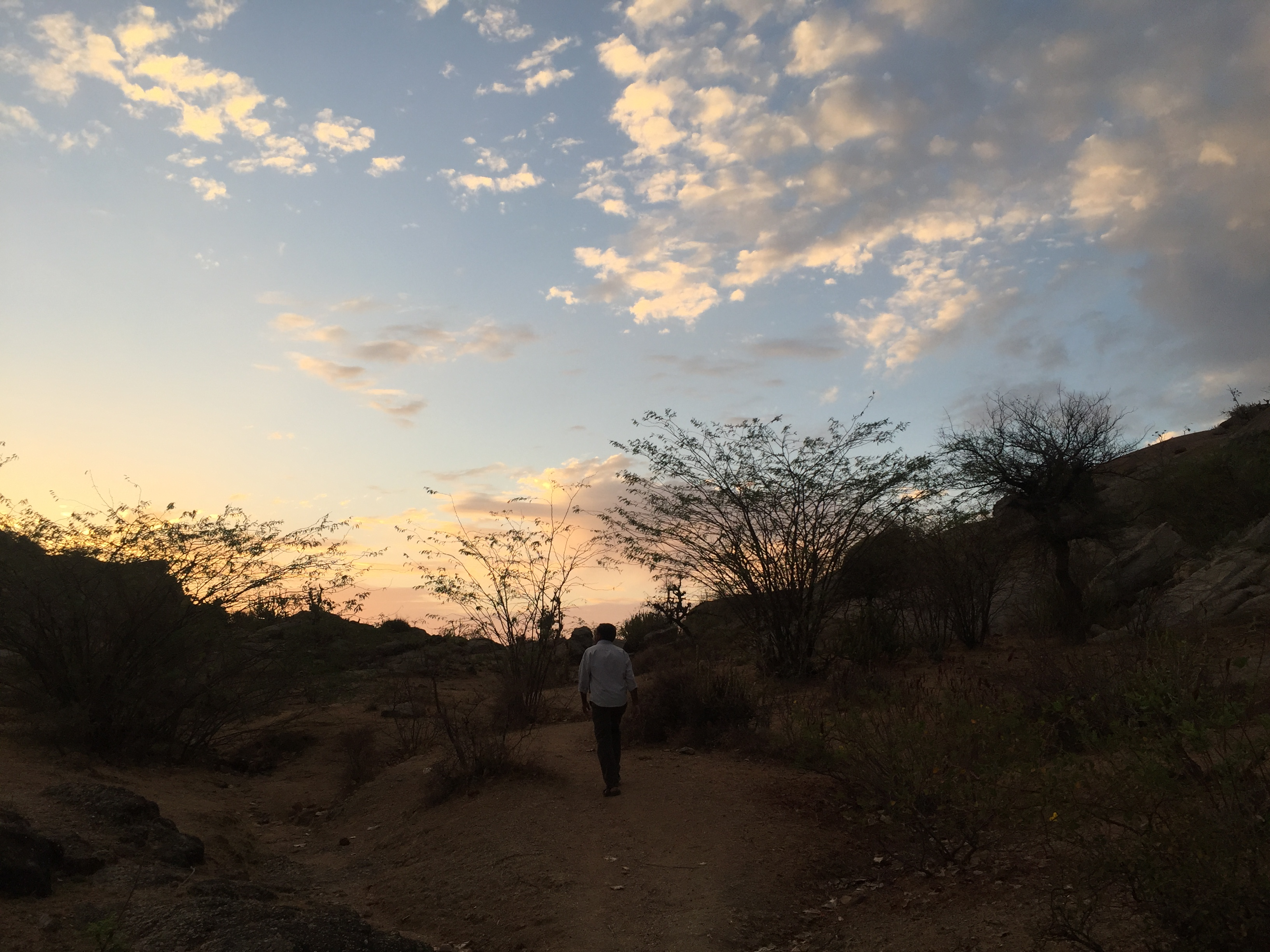

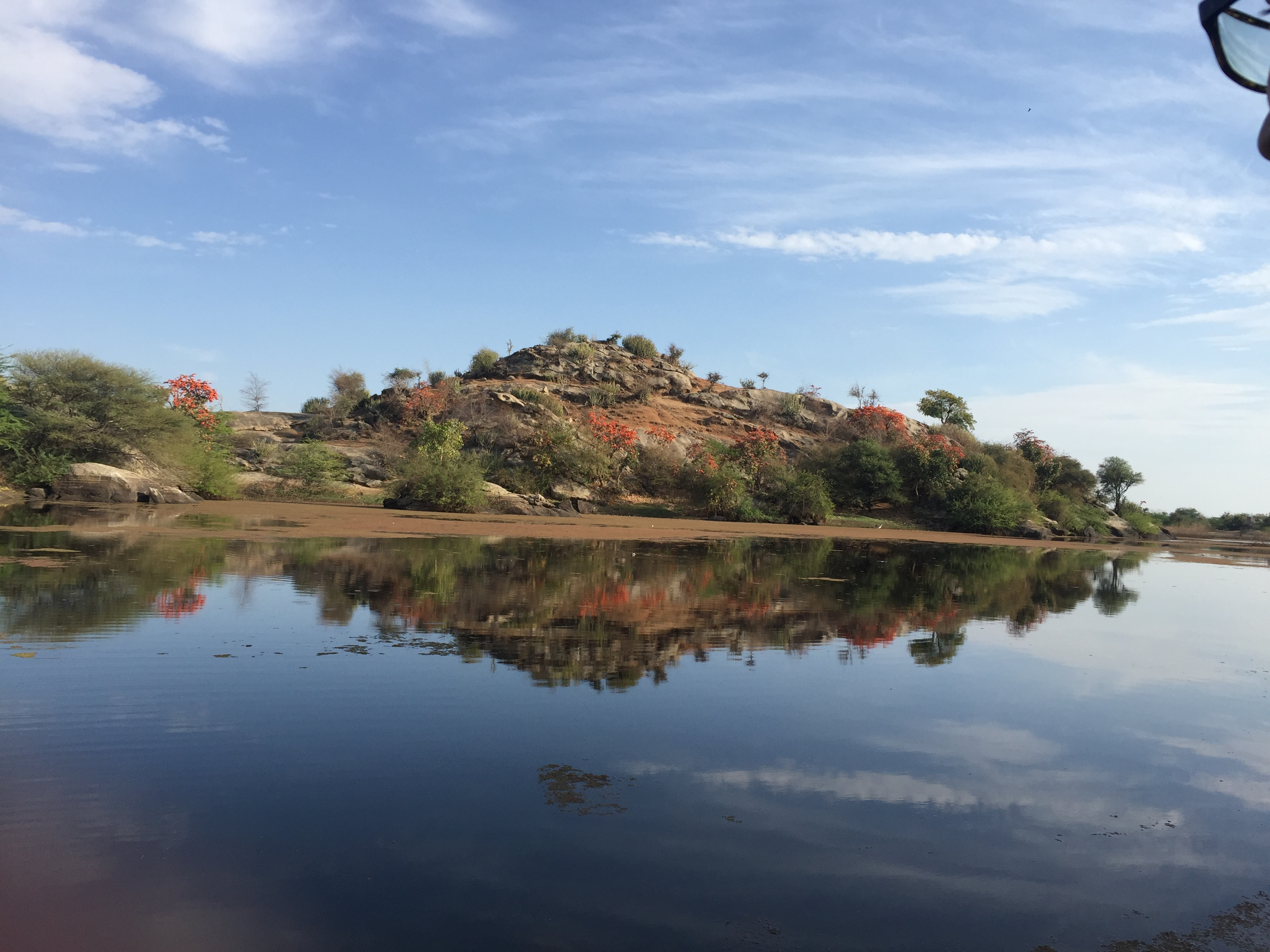

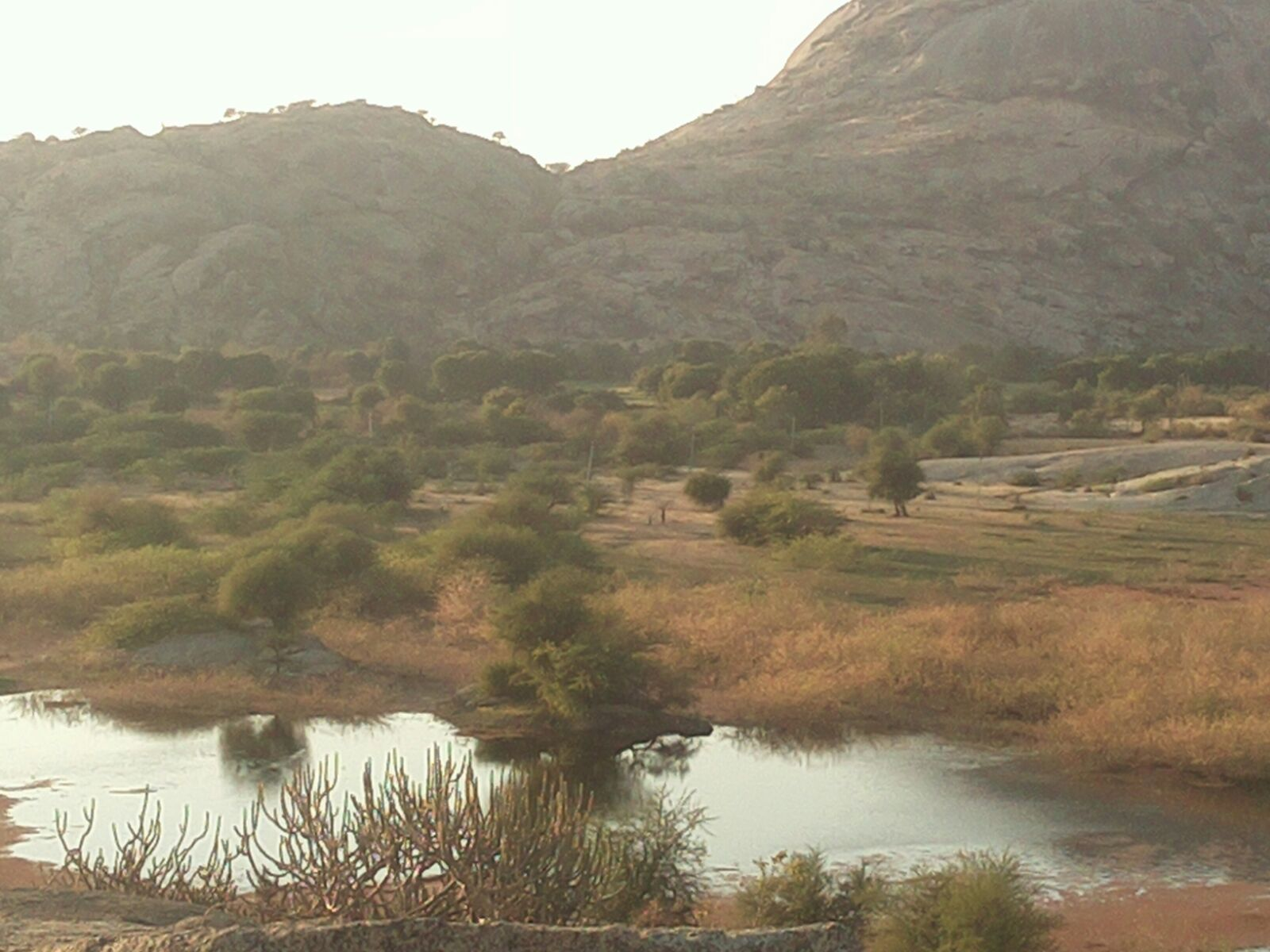
