= Voľa =

Voľa Laborcfalva
- Municipality
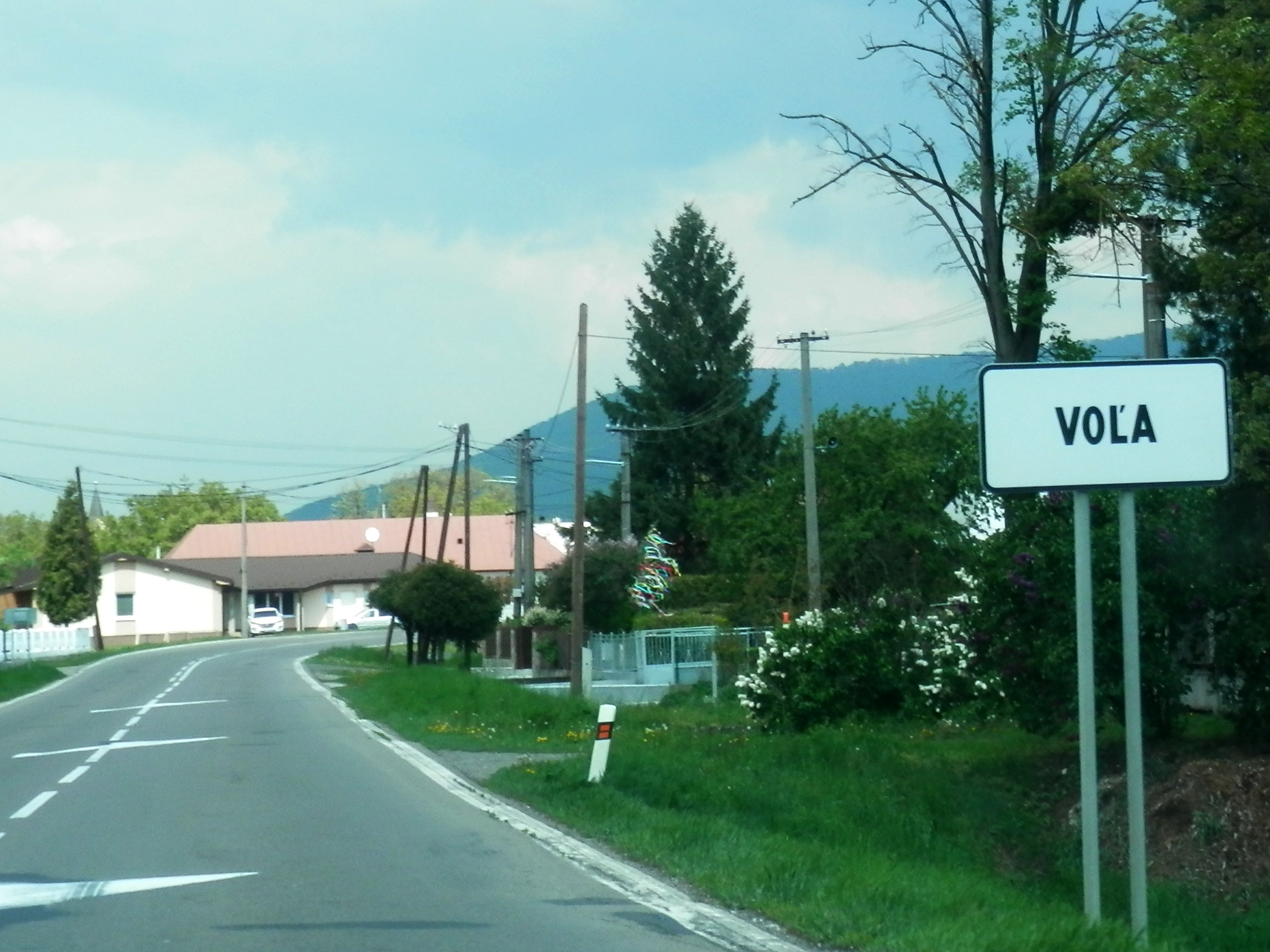

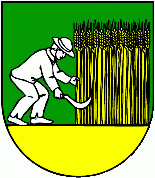
- Flag Coat of arms

- Location of Voľa in the Košice Region Location of Voľa in Slovakia
- Coordinates: 48.85°N 21.85°E
- Country: Slovakia
- Region: Košice Region
- District: Michalovce District
- First mentioned: 1357

Area
  - Total: 5.78 km^{2} (2.23 sq mi)
- Elevation: 126 m (413 ft)

Population (2025)
  - Total: 273
- Time zone: UTC+1 (CET)
  - Summer (DST): UTC+2 (CEST)
- Postal code: 722 1
- Area code: +421 56
- Vehicle registration plate (until 2022): MI
- Website: obecvola.sk

Voľa (Hungarian: Laborcfalva) is a village and municipality in Michalovce District in the Kosice Region of eastern Slovakia.

== History ==
In historical records the village was first mentioned in 1357.

== Geography ==
The municipality lies at an altitude of 126 metres (413 ft) and covers an area of 5.78 km^{2} (2.23 sq mi) (2025).

Voľa neighbours Nacina Ves to the south and the town of Strážske to the north. To the west of the main village lies the small hamlet of Vybuchanec, the only other settled place in the Voľa municipality.

== Transport ==
Voľa lies on the main road and near the main railway line between Michalovce and Humenné.

The village is serviced by regular bus lines on the main road. The nearest large train station is in Strážske and a smaller one in Nacina Ves.

== Population ==
Population statistic (10 years)
Year	1995	2005	2015	2025
Count	248	251	260	273
Difference		+1.20%	+3.58%	+5%

Population statistic
Year	2024	2025
Count	271	273
Difference		+0.73%

It has a population of 273 people (31 December 2025).

=== Ethnicity ===
Census 2021 (1+ %)
Ethnicity	Number	Fraction
Slovak	243	93.1%
Not found out	10	3.83%
Ukrainian	3	1.14%
Italian	3	1.14%
Rusyn	3	1.14%
Other	3	1.14%
Total	261	

In year 2021 was 261 people by ethnicity 243 as Slovak, 10 as Not found out, 3 as Ukrainian, 3 as Italian, 3 as Rusyn, 3 as Other, 1 as Czech and 1 as Polish.

Note on population: The difference values of population numbers in the table "Population statistic" and in the sections "Ethnicity" & "Religion" is caused by the use of various statistical methods.

=== Religion ===
Census 2021 (1+ %)
Religion	Number	Fraction
Greek Catholic Church	124	47.51%
Roman Catholic Church	101	38.7%
None	18	6.9%
Not found out	10	3.83%
Eastern Orthodox Church	6	2.3%
Total	261	

In year 2021 was 261 people by religion 124 from Greek Catholic Church, 101 from Roman Catholic Church, 18 from None, 10 from Not found out, 6 from Eastern Orthodox Church, 1 from Other and 1 from Ad hoc movements.
