= Vale das Fontes =

- Civil parish
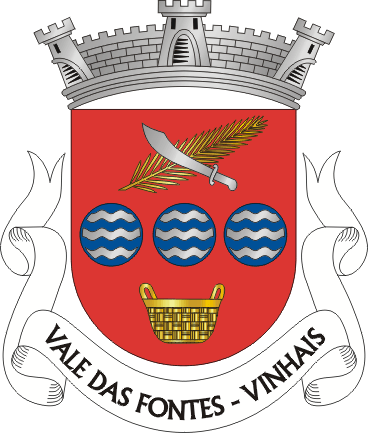
- Coat of arms

- Location in Portugal
- Coordinates: 41.721°N 7.135°W
- Country: Portugal
- Region: Norte
- Municipality: Vinhais

Area
  - Total: 17.76 km^{2} (6.86 sq mi)

Population (2011)
  - Total: 347
  - Density: 20/km^{2} (51/sq mi)
- Time zone: UTC+00:00 (WET)
  - Summer (DST): UTC+01:00 (WEST)

Vale das Fontes (Portuguese: Valley of the Springs) is a parish of Vinhais municipality in the Bragança district of northeast Portugal. The parish includes the villages of Vale das Fontes, Nuzedo de Baixo and Minas. These villages belong to the so-called terra quente, or hot land. Olive oil and wine are the main agricultural produce.

The population in 2011 was 347, in an area of 17.76 km^{2}.

The Tuela river, a tributary of the Tua River, crosses this territory throughout deep, fertile and pleasant valleys.

== History ==
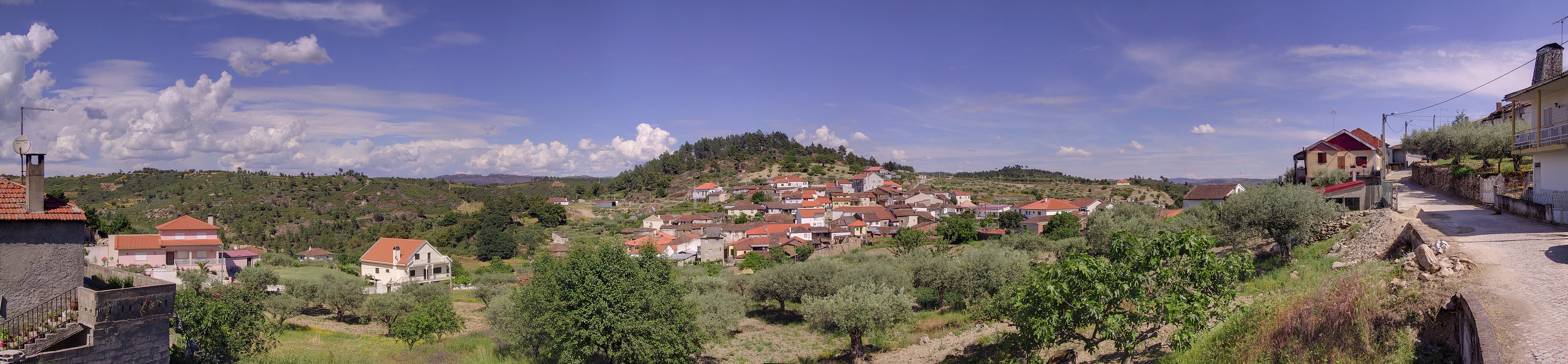

The origin of this parish is very old. That is shown by archeological findings. Along the river Tuela existed a fortress, called "Muradal" (for resemblance to a wall), whose rock, granite, which is well preserved. On this site were also fragments of pottery found believed to be from the Bronze Age. This confirms the antiquity of this fortress, being one of the best preserved of the municipality of Vinhais.

There is also a place called Castrilhão where they found several objects of that era.

Along the river, at the foot of Muradal, there is a cave, “Torca ou Pala dos Vermelhos”, which has been occupied since ancient times and that served as a haven for republicans fleeing the Spanish Civil War.

In the zone of Nuzedo de Baixo lies the mining complex Nuzedo / Ervedosa. These open pit mines, which some were already exploited since the Arab occupation, or even since the Bronze Age, operated until 1969, when the British owners abandoned them.

Mining brought great development to this region and made that many people of different cultures stayed here. Thus, came a mixture, which made that the people of these lands have very distinct facial features than the areas further north.

There are no indications of ancient Vale das Fontes, but there are references on Nuzedo in the Inquisition of 1258.

Both Vale das Fontes and the villages belonging to it are part of the municipality of Vinhais since the end of the twelfth century.

== Heraldry ==
- Coat of Arms: Red shield, three sources lined up in a band, under a silver knife and a golden palm, on top of a golden wicker hamper. Silver mural crown with three towers. White listel with caption in black: "VALE DAS FONTES".
- Flag: yellow. Gold and red cord and tassels. Golden rod and spear.

== Festivals and Fairs ==
What	When	Where	Description
Feast of Saint Stephen	Takes place on January 1	Vale das Fontes	It is the traditional festival of the village, and is quite old. It consists of a “encamisada” (reveille), which is organized by several people who roam the streets of the village, together with a group of bagpipers, in which the people make a parade, where they also bring animals.
Feast of Saint Bartholomew	Commemorates on August 24	Vale das Fontes	This is the main party of the village. It consists of a procession around the parish accompanied by a band. During two days, they are performances by various ensembles.
Feast of Senhor dos Aflitos	It takes place on the 2nd Sunday of August	Nuzedo de Baixo	It is organized in the same way that the Feast of St. Bartholomew.

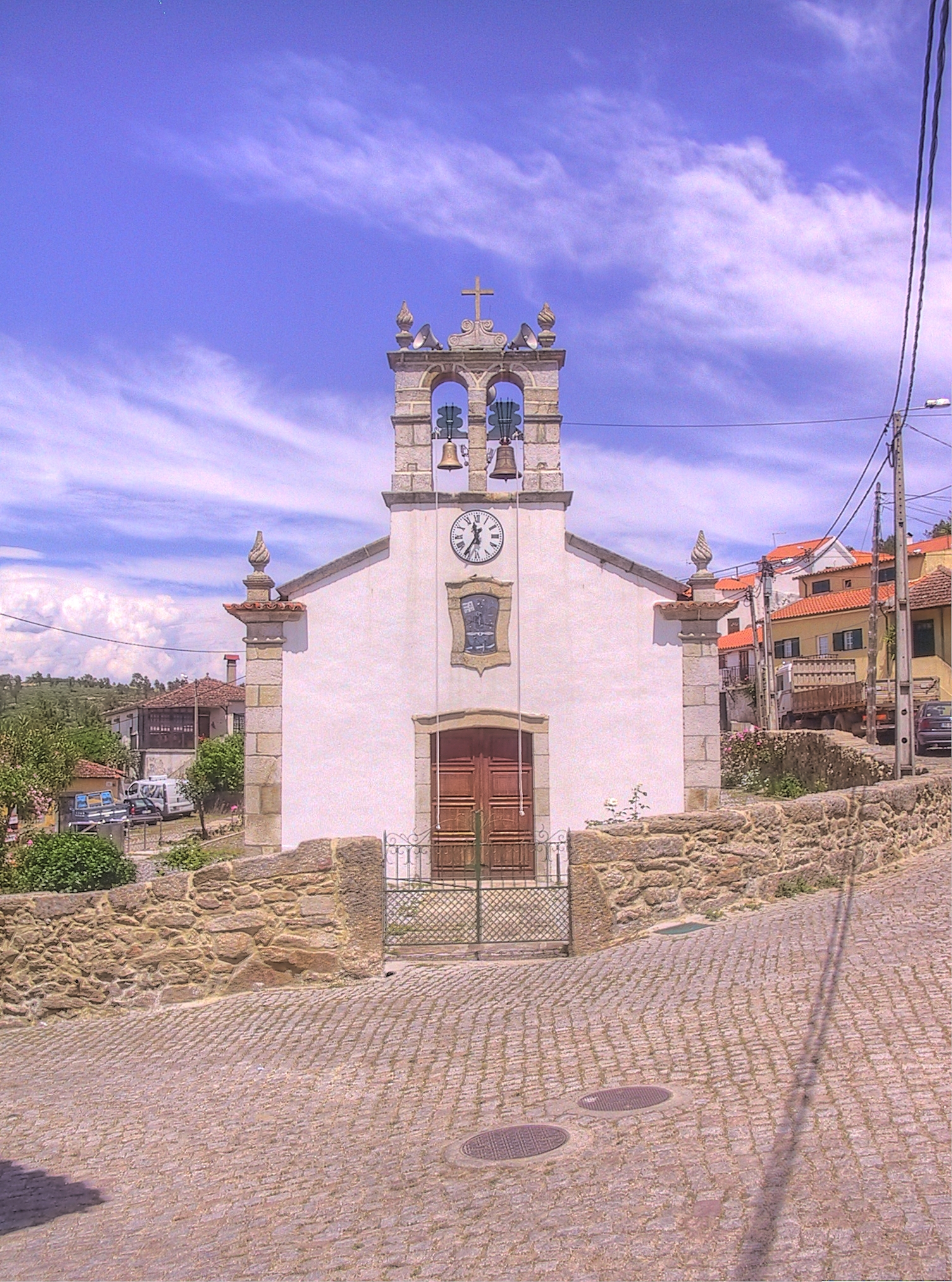
Igreja Matriz de Vale das Fontes
