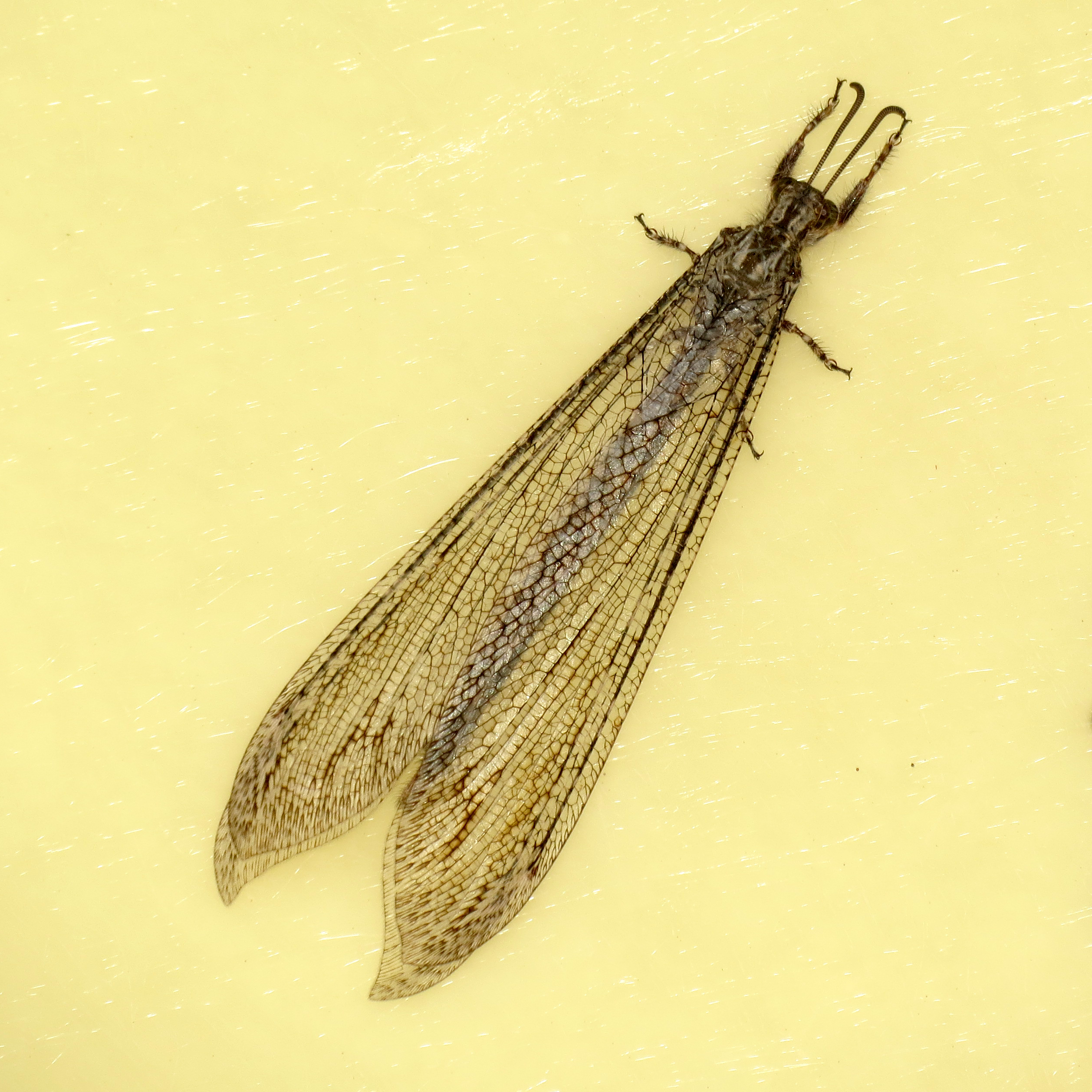

Scientific classification
- Kingdom: Animalia
- Phylum: Arthropoda
- Class: Insecta
- Order: Neuroptera
- Family: Myrmeleontidae
- Genus: Vella
- Species: V. fallax

Binomial name
- Vella fallax (Rambur, 1842)

= Vella fallax =

Species of insect

Vella fallax is a species of antlion in the family Myrmeleontidae. It is found in the Caribbean Sea, Central America, North America, and South America.

== Subspecies ==
These two subspecies belong to the species Vella fallax:

- Vella fallax fallax (Rambur, 1842)
- Vella fallax texana (Hagen, 1887)

== Gallery ==
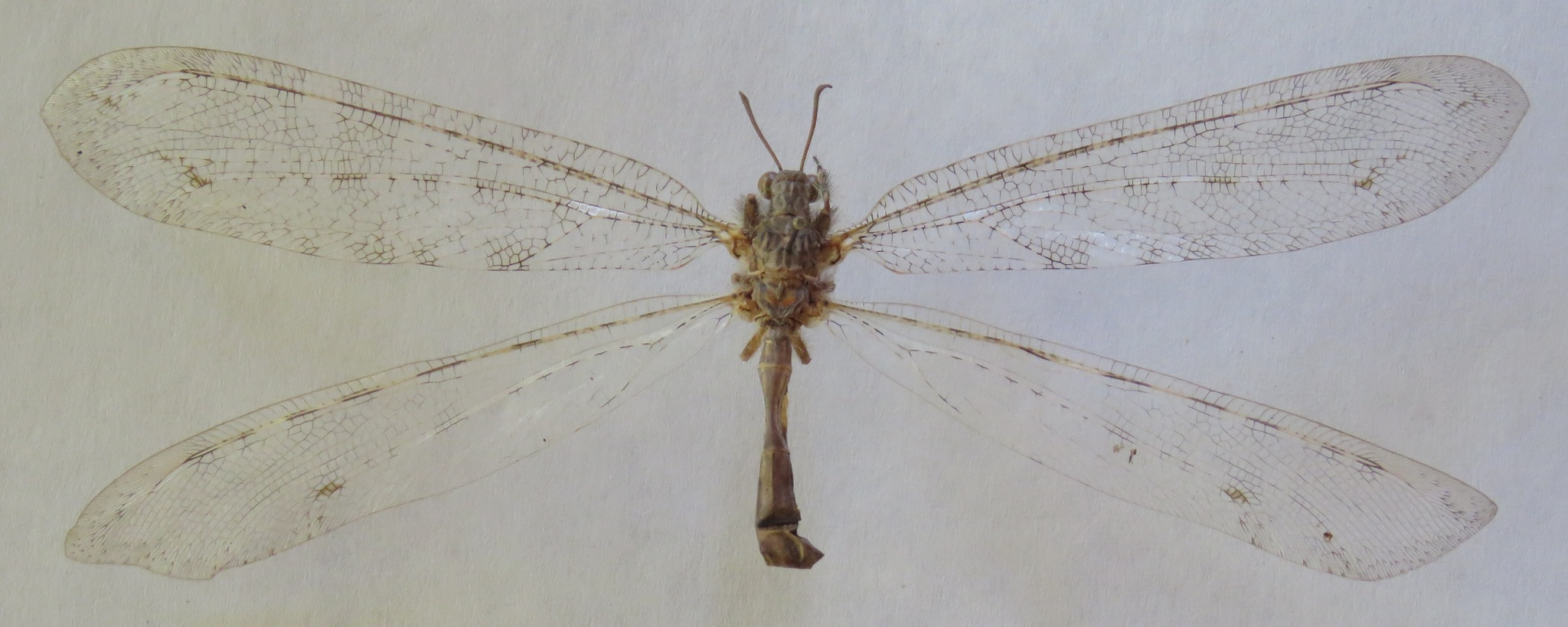
V. fallax fallax collected in Nicaragua

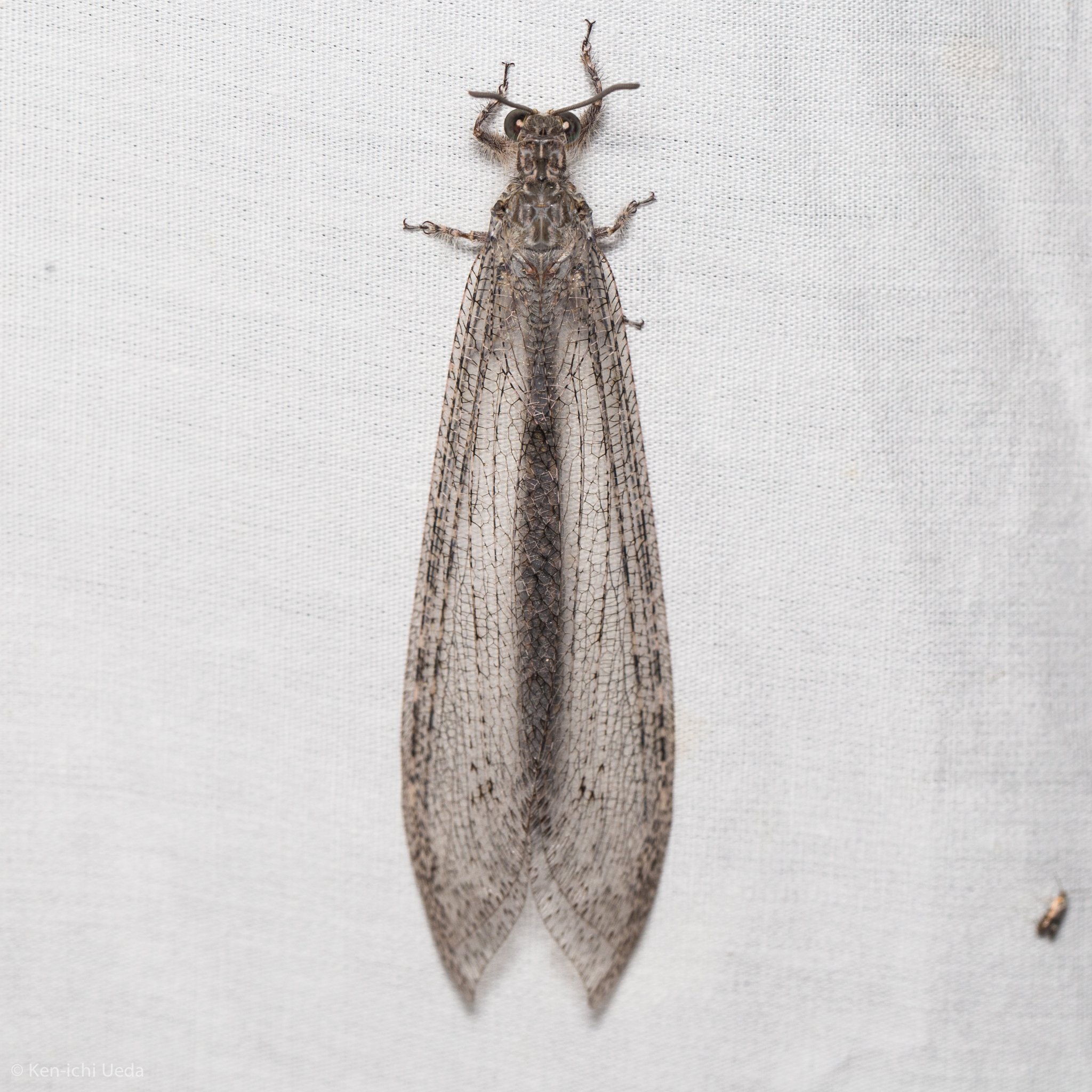
V. fallax texana in Arizona
