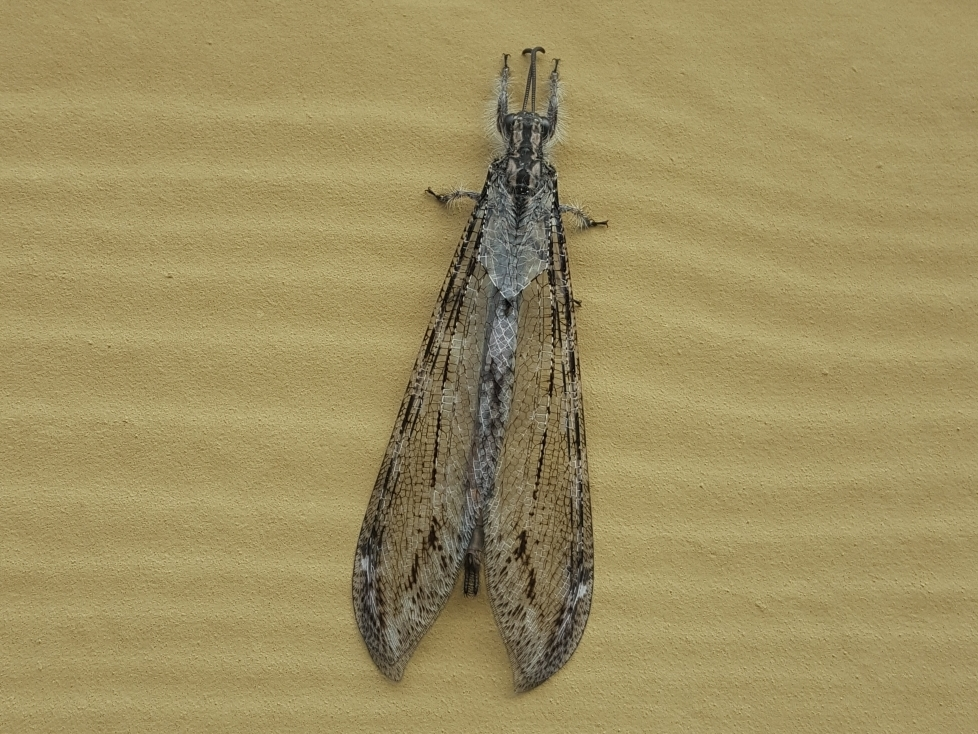

Scientific classification
- Domain: Eukaryota
- Kingdom: Animalia
- Phylum: Arthropoda
- Class: Insecta
- Order: Neuroptera
- Family: Myrmeleontidae
- Genus: Vella
- Species: V. americana

Binomial name
- Vella americana (Drury, 1773)

= Vella americana =

Species of insect

Vella americana is a species of antlion in the family Myrmeleontidae. It is found in North America.
