= Vola =

Vola may refer to:

== People ==
- Vola Vale (1897–1970), American actress
- François Vola (born 1953), French guitarist and composer
- Louis Vola (1902–1990), French double-bassist
- Vicki Vola (1916–1985), American actress

== Bands ==
- Vola (band), a Danish progressive metal band
- Vola and the Oriental Machine, a Japanese rock band

== Other uses ==
- Voľa, a municipality in eastern Slovakia
- Alfa Romeo Vola, a concept car

== See also ==
- Valo (disambiguation)
- Volo (disambiguation)
