= Volo =

Volo can refer to:

== Places ==
- Volo, Illinois, a village in the United States
  - Volo Auto Museum
- Volos, Greek city
- Çatalada (Volo)

== Music ==
- Volo (duo), French duo made up of Frédéric and Olivier Volovitch
- Il Volo, Italian operatic pop trio
- Volo, an album by the Italian progressive rock band Goblin

== Others ==
- Volo (Company), a British retail technology business.
- SS Volo, a merchant vessel launched in 1938 and sunk in 1941
- Volo (barque), a merchant vessel built in the 1880s and wrecked in 1886
- Volothamp Geddarm, a fictional historian and travel writer from the world of Forgotten Realms created by Ed Greenwood
- Volo, a character from Pokémon Legends: Arceus.
- bocce volo, a boules game, a variation on the game of bocce

== See also ==
- Valo (disambiguation)
- Vola (disambiguation)
