= Vala Chakradhar Rao =

Indian politician

Dr. Vala Chakradhar Rao

Ex-MLA
- Incumbent
- Assumed office 1972-78
- Constituency: Nizamabad

Personal details
- Born: 28 March 1928 Yamanapalli, Mahadevpur, Karimnagar district, Andhra Pradesh
- Died: 27 September 1991 (aged 63) Nizamabad, Andhra Pradesh
- Citizenship: India
- Party: Indian National Congress
- Spouse: Vala Kamala Devi
- Children: 6

Dr. Vala Chakradhar Rao (28 March 1928 – 27 September 1991) was a doctor and politician. He was Vice President of the All India Private Medical Practitioner Association (PMP) and was President for the Andhra Pradesh state PMP for over 20 years. He was elected as Member of Legislative Assembly (MLA) as an independent candidate from Nizamabad constituency to the AP State Assembly in 1972.

== Early life ==
Chakradhar Rao completed a degree in HDMS (Homeopathy) from Sinha Homeopathy Medical College, Laherir Sarai, Bihar State in 1946-50.

== Personal life ==
Kamala Devi

Rao born to a landlord (Vala Venkata Narasimha Rao) in Yamanapally village of Karimnagar District of AP.

Rao moved to Nizamabad and started his own medical clinic to serve poor people.

Rao married to Kamala Devi (daughter of Kakulamarri Lakshmi Narasimha Rao, landlord) from Eturnagaram, Warangal Dist., AP) and have 3 sons (Ranga Rao- premlata rao, Narasimha Rao- sucharitha rao, Ravinder Rao- suma rao) and 3 daughters (prabhakar rao-Vasundhara, ram mohan rao- Vijaya and DR ravichandra- Vasudha). His grand children { Kamal Rao, Pavan Rao, Siddarth Rao, Vijaya Sarathi Rao, Harish Rao, Dheeraj Rao, and Kovidh Rao.}

Late Smt. Kamala Devi was a social worker in Nizamabad and helped many poor for survival. Rao made foundation to many major projects and was the key person to get Law college in Nizamabad.

Rao provided lands to poor in suburbs of Nizamabad and that place is named after him as Chakradhar Nagar.

== Political life ==
Serving as MLA

Rao began his career of public service by conducting free medical checkups in Nizamabad.

Rao was elected as governor to Lions club for Nizamabad and also became vice president to all India private medical practitioners association (PMP) for 1 year and was president for AP state PMP association for more than 20 years till his death.

After his wife, Kamala Devi's death in 1970, Rao deeply involved in social service being a Municipal Chairman and later won elections for Member of Legislative Assembly (MLA) as independent for Nizamabad of Andhra Pradesh State Assembly.

Rao served mentored many party workers, who have become MLAs, MPs and occupied key Ministries in AP state cabinet.

== Career ==
with PV Narasimha Rao

Rao served at many other important positions in medical and political areas:

- Municipal Chairman (Nizamabad) - 1967 to 1972
- Member of Legislative Assembly, MLA (Nizamabad) - 1972 to 1978
- Vice President, All India Private Medical Practitioners Association (PMP)
- President, AP State Private Medical Practitioners Association (PMP)
- President, Nizamabad Medical Association
- Lions Club Governor, (Nizamabad) - 1984-85
