= Vilar de Lomba e São Jomil =

- Civil parish
- Location in Portugal
- Coordinates: 41.811°N 7.182°W
- Country: Portugal
- Region: Norte
- Intermunic. comm.: Terras de Trás-os-Montes
- District: Bragança
- Municipality: Vinhais

Area
  - Total: 29.48 km^{2} (11.38 sq mi)

Population (2011)
  - Total: 237
  - Density: 8.0/km^{2} (21/sq mi)
- Time zone: UTC+00:00 (WET)
  - Summer (DST): UTC+01:00 (WEST)

Vilar de Lomba e São Jomil is a civil parish in the municipality of Vinhais, Portugal. It was formed in 2013 by the merger of the former parishes Vilar de Lomba and São Jomil. The population in 2011 was 237, in an area of 29.48 km².

== Images ==
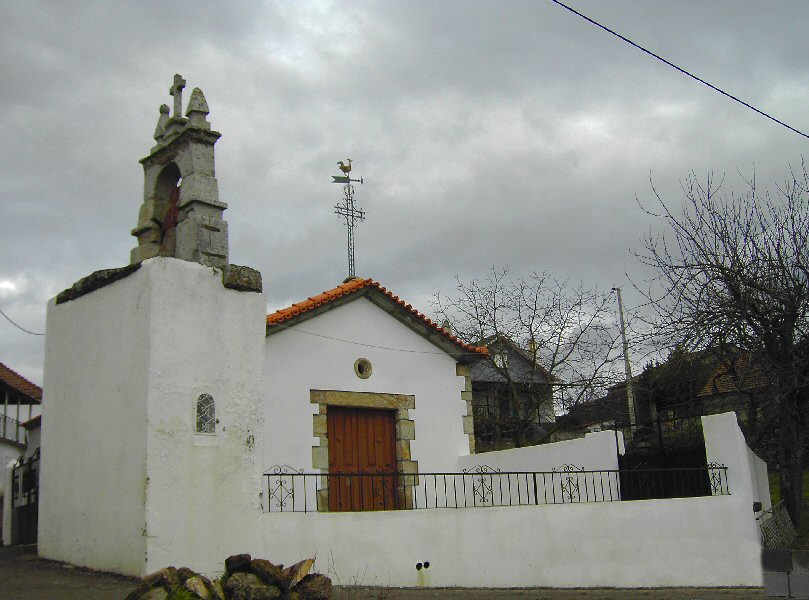
Church of Vilar de Lomba

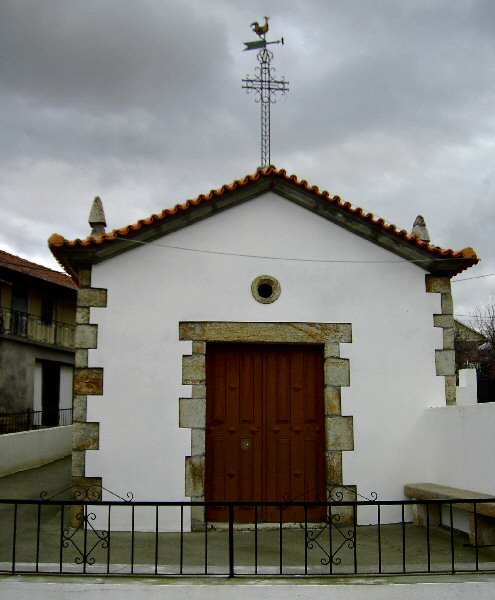
Church of Vilar de Lomba

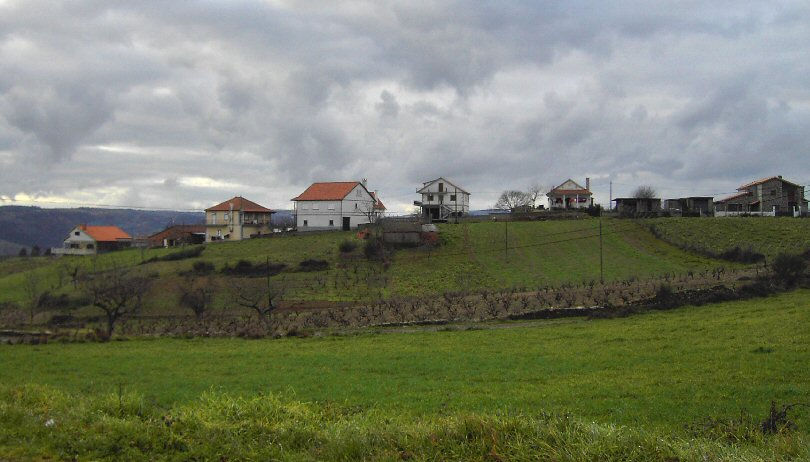
View of Vilar de Lomba
