= Mont Vélan =

Mountain in Switzerland/Italy

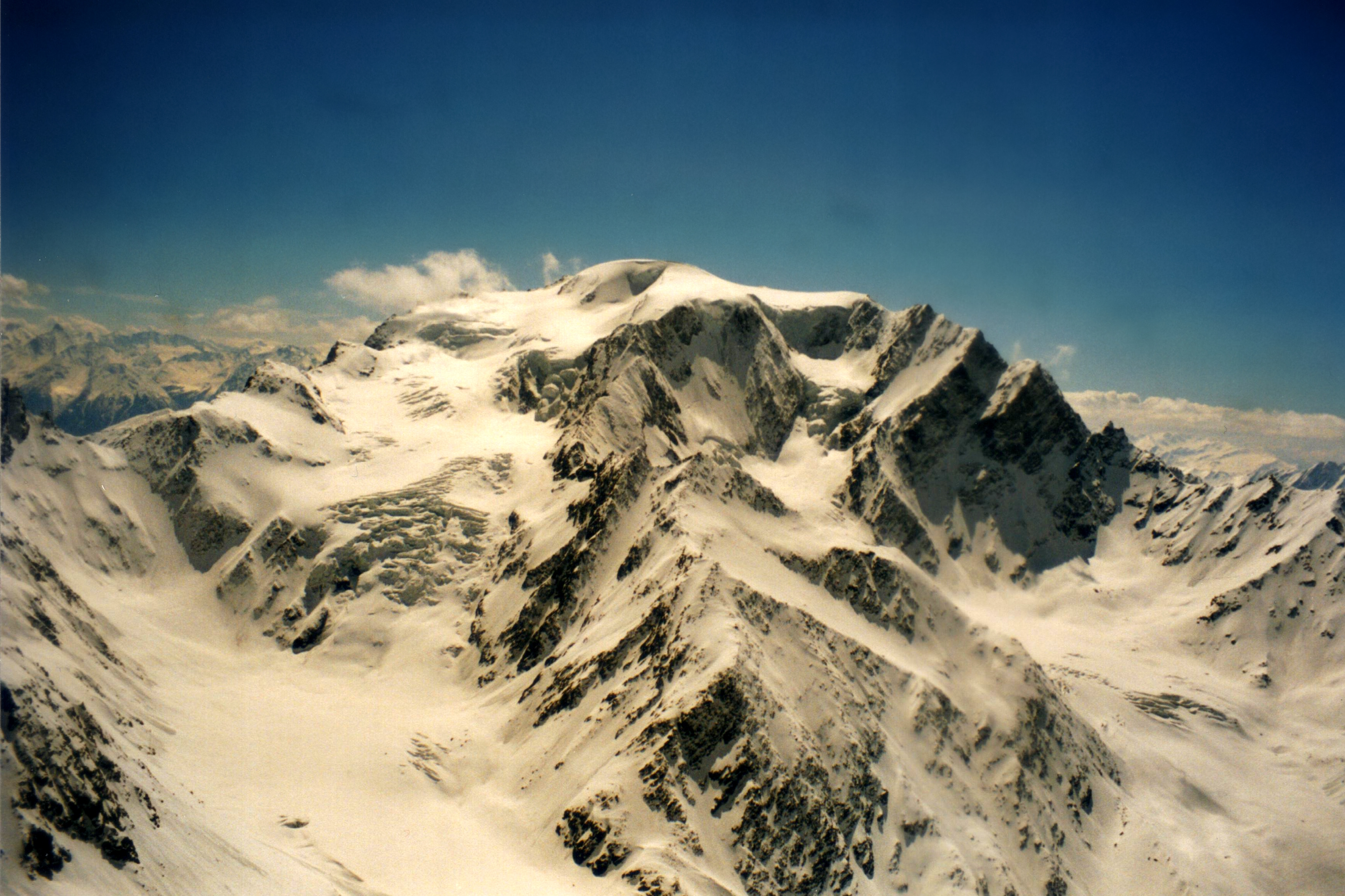
- Mont Vélan as seen from Grand Combin

Highest point
- Elevation: 3,727 m (12,228 ft)
- Prominence: 621 m (2,037 ft)
- Parent peak: Grand Combin
- Isolation: 5.53 km (3.44 mi)
- Listing: Alpine mountains above 3000 m
- Coordinates: 45°53′35″N 7°15′03.8″E

Geography
- Location within Alps
- Location: Valais, Switzerland; Aosta Valley, Italy
- Parent range: Pennine Alps

Climbing
- First ascent: August 31, 1779 by Laurent Joseph Murith

Mont Vélan is a mountain of the Pennine Alps, located on the border between Switzerland and Italy. At 3,727 metres, Mont Vélan is the highest summit lying between the Great St Bernard Pass and Grand Combin. Two large glaciers cover its northern flanks: Glacier de Tseudet (west) and Glacier de Valsoray (east). The Glacier de Proz, lying on the west side, was traversed during the first ascent.

The mountain is located south of Bourg-Saint-Pierre in the canton of Valais and north of Etroubles in the Aosta Valley. The Petit Vélan is a lower summit in the same massif lying north to the main summit.

== First ascent ==
The protagonist of the first successful ascent of the Velan was a priest of the Great St Bernard Hospice, Laurent Joseph Murith. He had been born in the nearby village of Sembrancher in 1742 and had taken holy orders in 1776. Murith, besides being an ecclesiastic, was a scientist, and was the author of a botanical handbook to the Valais. He was acquainted with the Genevese scientists and welcomed them when they came to his parish of Liddes or to the St Bernard Hospice, of which he later became prior. He decided to climb Mont Vélan, which was the most impressive peak in his region.

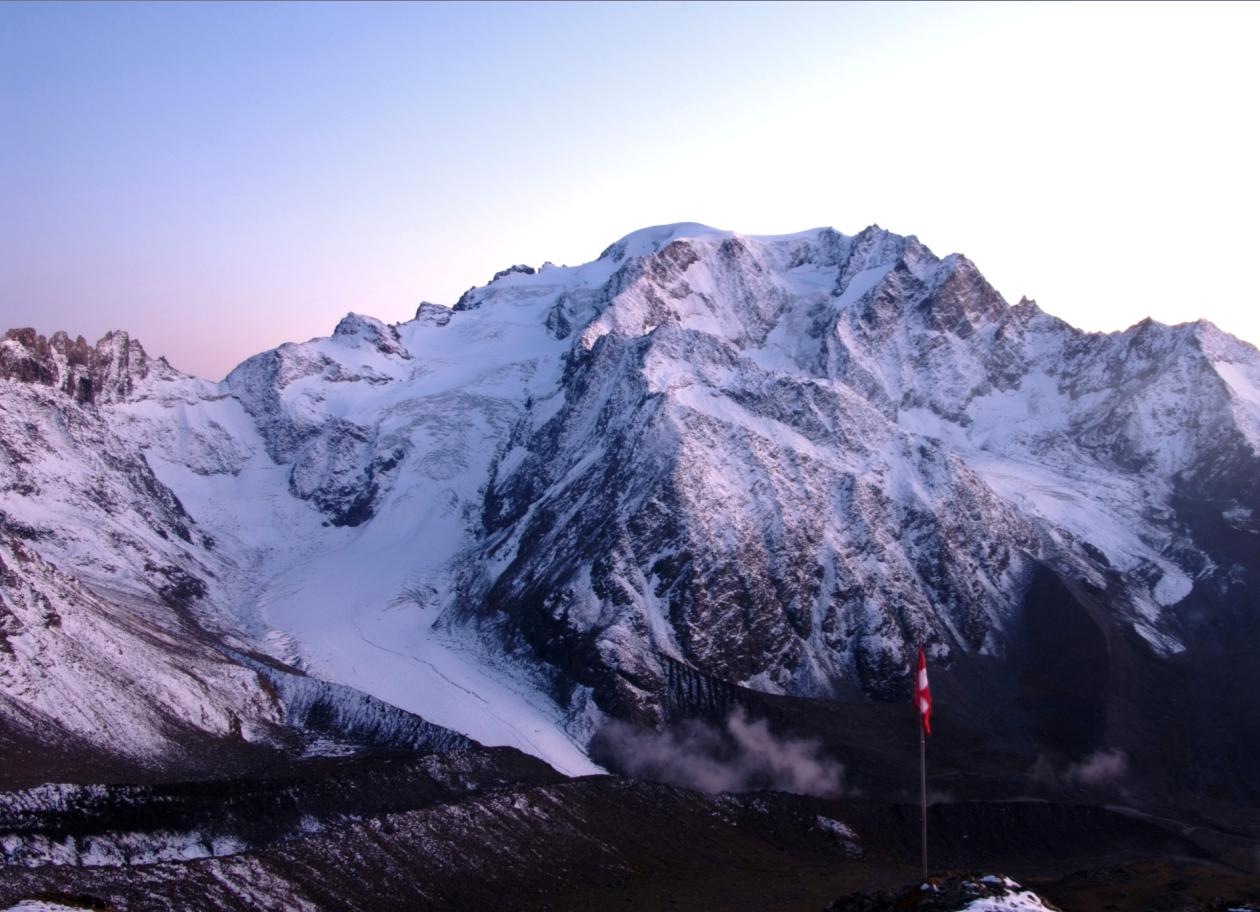
Mont Vélan as seen from Valsoray hut

Murith found two hunters who had some idea how to lead the climb, and the three men started on August 31, 1779, carrying food for several days and a barometer which, by luck, was not broken during the ascent. They slept a night on the way and proceeded to attack the mountain from the Glacier de Proz. They encountered numerous difficulties, amongst others a wall of ice which Murith climbed by hacking steps and hand-holds with a pointed hammer. The hunters complained of the heat and of exhaustion, but Murith successfully reached the summit. When he was back in Liddes, he wrote triumphantly to Horace-Bénédict de Saussure to describe his climb:

"Had you been with me you would have enjoyed the most splendid spectacle of mountains and glaciers you can imagine; you would have been able to gaze on a wide circle of peaks of different heights, from Turin to the Little St. Bernard, from the St. Bernard to the Lake of Geneva, from Vevey to the St. Gothard, from the St. Gothard to Turin . . . But I cannot promise I will help you to enjoy so ravishing a view. In spite of my own intrepidity, I had too much trouble in gaining the summit of this wintry giant."

Feeling proud of his achievement he wrote a few months later to the Genevese traveller Marc Theodore Bourrit:

"The prospect from the Buet is magnificent but the Velan, which is hardly less than 100 toises lower than the highest point of Mont Blanc, would have delighted you; you would have seen the universe under your feet, the points and needles of the highest hills looking like a tumultuous sea ... I believe I ascended one of the first great peaks ever climbed in Europe."

== See also ==
- List of mountains of Switzerland
