= Vinhais =

- Municipality
- Town of Vinhais
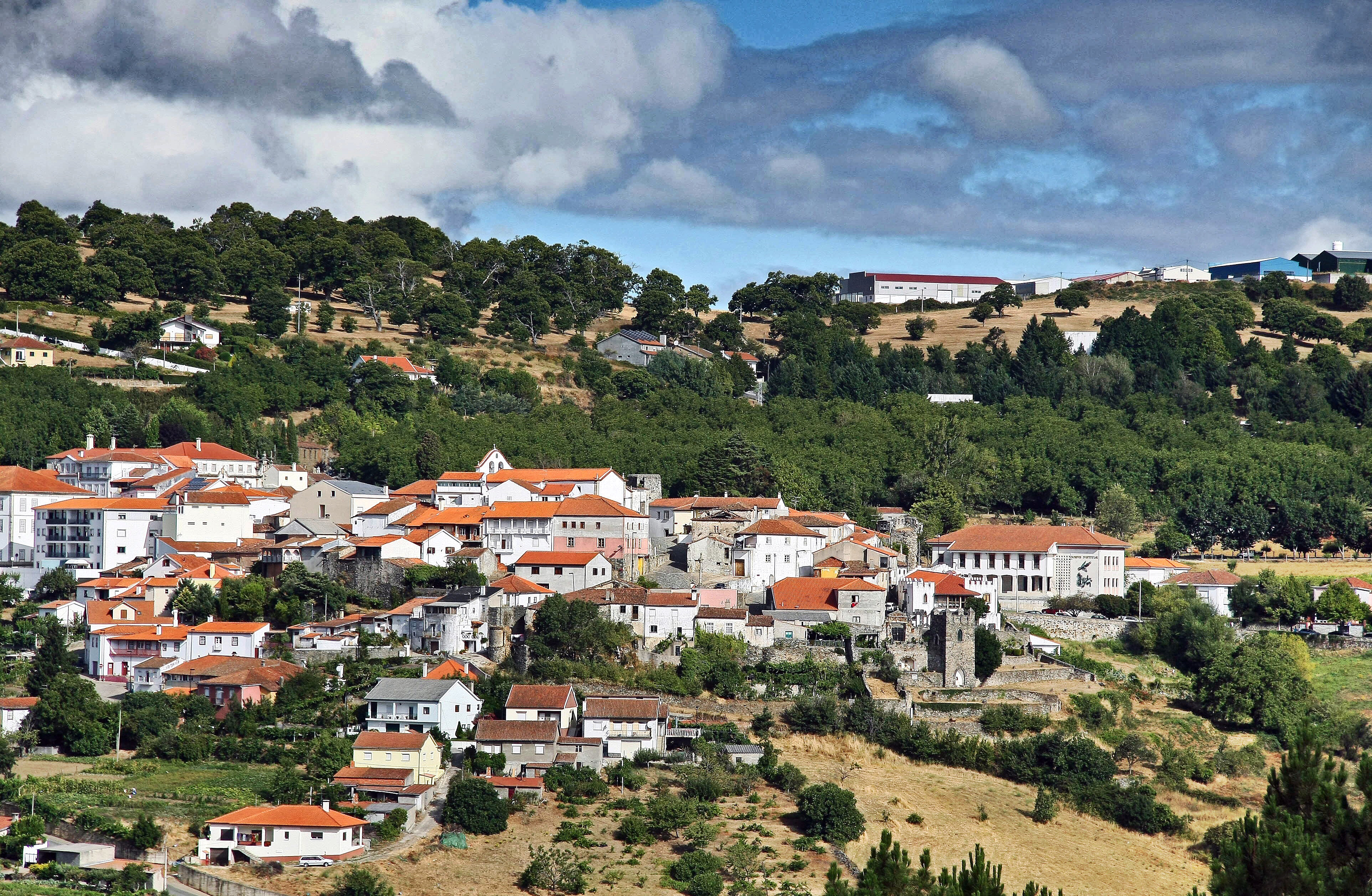
- View of Vinhais

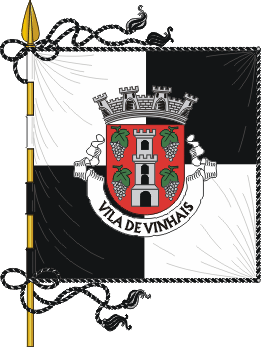
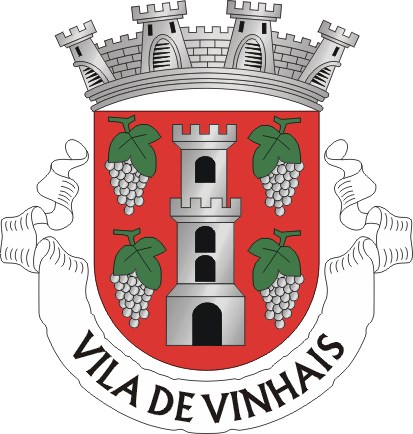
- Flag Coat of arms
- Interactive map of Vinhais
- Coordinates: 41°49′N 7°00′W
- Country: Portugal
- Region: Norte
- Intermunic. comm.: Terras de Trás-os-Montes
- District: Bragança
- Parishes: 26

Area
  - Total: 694.76 km^{2} (268.25 sq mi)

Population (2011)
  - Total: 9,066
  - Density: 13.05/km^{2} (33.80/sq mi)
- Time zone: UTC+00:00 (WET)
  - Summer (DST): UTC+01:00 (WEST)
- Website: http://www.cm-vinhais.pt

Vinhais (European Portuguese: [viˈɲajʃ]; Proto-Celtic: *Veniatia), officially Town of Vinhais (Portuguese: Vila de Vinhais), is a municipality in the district of Bragança, northern Portugal. The population in 2011 was 9,066, in an area of 694.76 square kilometres (268.25 sq mi).

== Parishes ==
The municipality is composed of 26 parishes:

- Agrochão
- Candedo
- Celas
- Curopos e Vale de Janeiro
- Edral
- Edrosa
- Ervedoa
- Moimenta e Montouto
- Nunes e Ousilhão
- Paçó
- Penhas Juntas
- Quirás e Pinheiro Novo
- Rebordelo
- Santalha
- Sobreiró de Baixo e Alvaredos
- Soeira, Fresulfe e Mofreita
- Travanca e Santa Cruz
- Tuizelo
- Vale das Fontes
- Vila Boa de Ousilhão
- Vila Verde
- Vilar de Lomba e São Jomil
- Vilar de Ossos
- Vilar de Peregrinos
- Vilar Seco de Lomba
- Vinhais
