= Jorge Vala =

Jorge Vala (born 1947), PhD in social psychology, University of Louvain, is a psychologist. He was a full professor at ISCTE - Lisbon University Institute, and is currently a researcher at the Institute of Social Sciences (ICS)/University of Lisbon.

== Research focus ==
At ICS, his research focus on socio-cognitive processes, namely in the field of social representations and ideologies, social norms and social identities. His present projects articulate these processes with the study of racism and prejudice, immigration issues, political attitudes, social justice, and validation of everyday knowledge.

== Present and past positions ==
Vala was an invited professor at several universities, including the Paris Descartes University, École des hautes études en sciences sociales and the Rio de Janeiro State University. He was a member of the executive committee of the European Association of Experimental Social Psychology, president of the Portuguese Association of Psychology, editor of the Revista Psicologia. He was the Portuguese representative on the European Programme COST, as well as president of the Department of Social and Organizational Psychology at ISCTE. Currently, he is the national coordinator for the European Social Survey, and member of the Scientific Committee of the European Values Study. He is also member of the Scientific Board of the Fondation Suisse pour la Recherche en Sciences Sociales (FORS). Between May 2007 and September 2009, he chaired the ICS Academic Board; and he was its Director from 2010 till 2014.

== Selected publications ==
- Pereira, C., Vala, J. e Leyens, JPh (2009). From Infra-humanization to Discrimination: The Mediation of Symbolic Threat Needs Egalitarian Norms, Journal of Experimental Social Psychology, 45:336-344
- Vala, J., Pereira, C., Costa-Lopes, R. (2009).Is the attribution of cultural differences to minorities an expression of racial prejudice? International Journal of Psychology, 44: 1, 20–28.
- Vala, J.; Lopes, D.; Lima, M. (2008). Black Immigrants in Portugal: Luso-Tropicalism and Prejudice. Journal of Social Issues, 64, 287-302
- Aguiar, P., Vala, J, Correia, I & Pereira, C. (2008). Justice in our world and in that of others: Belief in a just world and reactions to victims. Social Justice Research, 21,50-68
- Lopes, D., Vala, J. & Marques, L. (2007) Social Validation of Everyday Knowledge: Heterogeneity and Consensus Functionality, Group Dynamics: Theory, Research, and Practice, 11,223-239.
- Vala, J. (2007). Representações Sociais e Psicologia Social do Conhecimento Quotidiano. In J. *Vala e M. B. Monteiro (Edits), Psicologia Social (7ª edição ). Lisboa. Fundação Calouste Gulbenkian
- Vala, J., Lima, M. & Lopes, D. (2004). Social values, prejudice and solidarity in the European Union. In W. Arts & L. Halman (Eds.), European values at the turn of the millennium. Leiden: Brill
- Vala, J., Brito, R. e Lopes, D. (1999). Expressões dos racismos em Portugal, Lisboa: Imprensa de Ciências Sociais.
- Vala, J., Garcia-Marques, L., Pereira, M. e Lopes, D. (1998). Validation of polemical social representations: Introducing the intergroup differentiation of homogeneity. Social Science Information, 37, 469–492.
- Vala, J. (1993). As representações sociais no quadro dos paradigmas e metáforas da psicologia social. Análise Social, 28 (4-5), 887-919
- Vala, J., Monteiro, M.B., e Leyens, J. Ph. (1988). Perception of violence as a function of observer's ideology and actor's group membership. British Journal of Social Psychology, 27, 231-237
