= Aleš Vála =

Czech ice hockey defenceman

- Born: October 8, 1973 (age 51)
- Height: 6 ft 2 in (188 cm)
- Weight: 209 lb (95 kg; 14 st 13 lb)
- Position: Defence
- Shot: Left
- Played for: HC Pardubice; HC Bílí Tygři Liberec; BK Mladá Boleslav
- Playing career: 1991–2015

Aleš Vála (born October 18, 1973) is a Czech former professional ice hockey defenceman.

Vála played seventeen games in the Czechoslovak First Ice Hockey League for HC Pardubice and thirty games in the Czech Extraliga for HC Bílí Tygři Liberec and BK Mladá Boleslav. He is currently working as equipment manager for Bílí Tygři Liberec.
