= Vilarinho =

Vilarinho may refer to:

== People ==
- Giancarlo Vilarinho (born 1992), Brazilian racing driver
- Manuel Vilarinho, Portuguese football president
- Manuel Vilarinho (painter) (born 1953), Portuguese painter

== Places ==
=== Portugal ===
- Vilarinho (Lousã), a civil parish in the municipality of Lousã
- Vilarinho (Santo Tirso), a civil parish in the municipality of Santo Tirso
- Vilarinho (Vila Verde), a civil parish in the municipality of Vila Verde

Other variants

- Vilarinho da Castanheira, a parish in the municipality of Carrazeda de Ansiães
- Vilarinho das Azenhas, a parish in the municipality of Vila Flor
- Vilarinho das Cambas, a parish in the municipality of Vila Nova de Famalicão
- Vilarinho da Furna, a village that was drowned by a dam with same name in Terras de Bouro
- Vilarinho das Paranheiras, a parish in the municipality of Chaves
- Vilarinho de Agrochão, a parish in the municipality of Macedo de Cavaleiros
- Vilarinho de Cotas, a parish in the municipality of Alijó
- Vilarinho de Cova de Lua, a parish in the municipality of Bragança
- Vilarinho de São Romão, a parish in the municipality of Sabrosa
- Vilarinho de Samardã, a parish in the municipality of Vila Real
- Vilarinho do Monte, a parish in the municipality of Macedo de Cavaleiros
- Vilarinho do Bairro, a parish in the municipality of Anadia (Portugal)
- Vilarinho dos Freires, a parish in the municipality of Peso da Régua
- Vilarinho dos Galegos, a parish in the municipality of Mogadouro
