= Valen =

Valen may refer to:

== Places ==
- Valen, Bindal, a fjord in the municipality of Bindal in Nordland county, Norway
- Valen, Kvinnherad, a village in the municipality of Kvinnherad in Vestland county, Norway
- Valen, Nærøy, a small village in the municipality of Nærøysund in Trondelag county, Norway
- Valen, Vadsø, a small village in the municipality of Vadsø in Finnmark county, Norway

== Other uses ==
- Valen (surname), a surname
- Valen TV, Norwegian comedy television series
- Valen (Babylon 5), a character in the television series Babylon 5
- Kamen Rider Valen, a character in the television series Kamen Rider Gavv

== See also ==
- Vale (disambiguation)
- Valan (disambiguation)
- Valens (disambiguation)
