= Petit Vélan =

Mountain in Switzerland

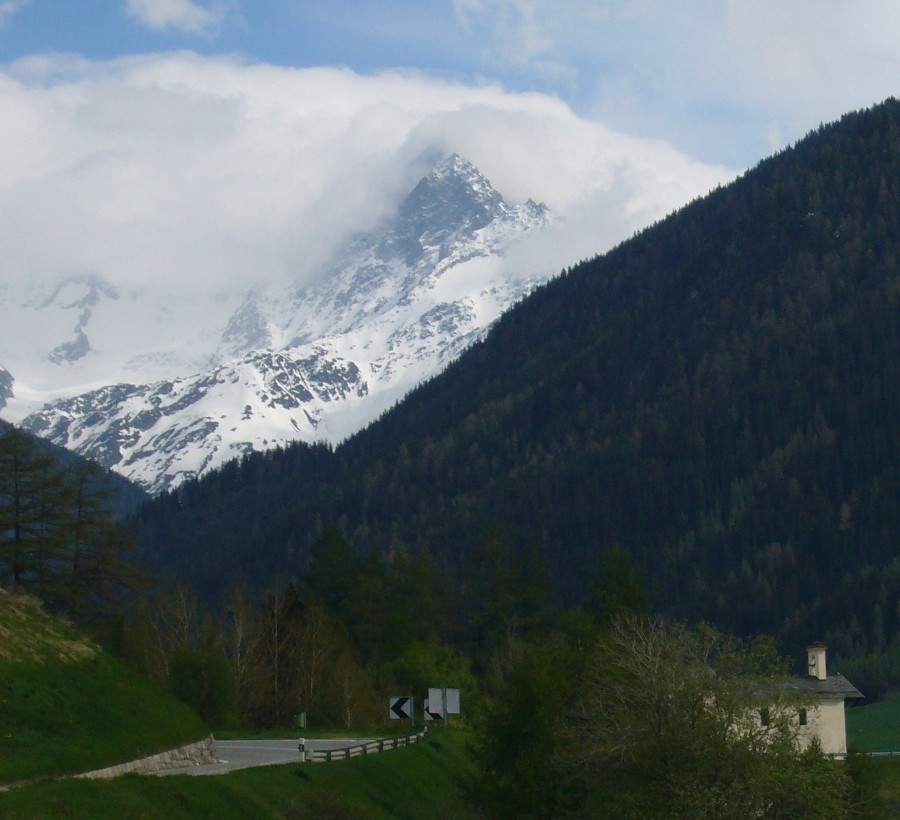
- Petit Vélan from the north

Highest point
- Elevation: 3,222 m (10,571 ft)
- Prominence: 53 m (174 ft)
- Parent peak: Mont Vélan
- Coordinates: 45°54′22.3″N 7°14′12.2″E

Geography
- Location within Switzerland
- Location: Valais, Switzerland
- Parent range: Pennine Alps

The Petit Vélan is a mountain of the Swiss Pennine Alps, located south of Bourg-Saint-Pierre in the canton of Valais. It lies NW of Mont Vélan.
