= Nacina Ves =

Village and municipality in Slovakia

Nacina Ves Nátafalva
- Municipality
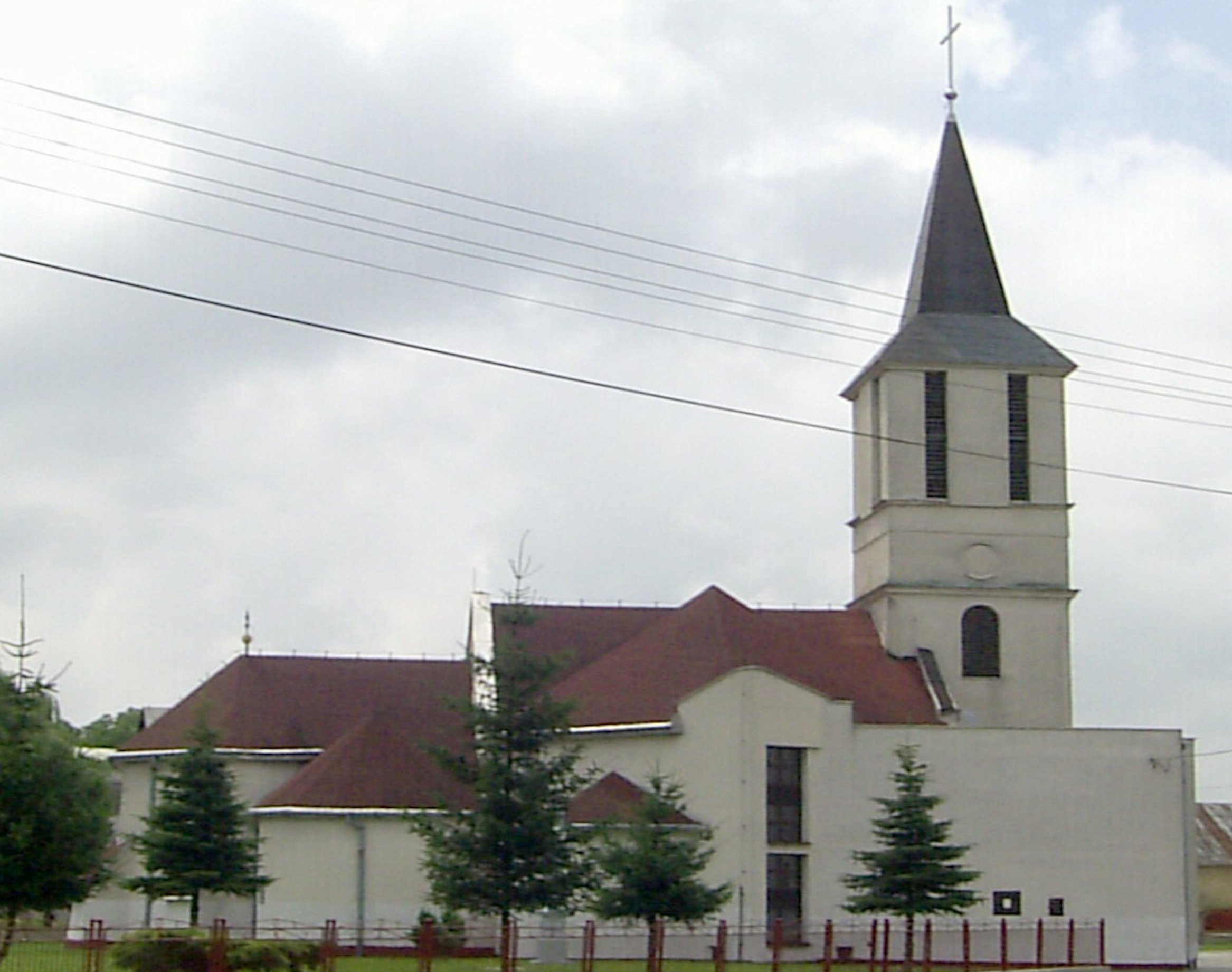

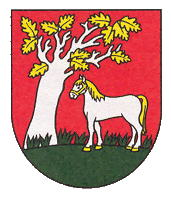
- Flag Coat of arms

- Location of Nacina Ves in the Košice Region Location of Nacina Ves in Slovakia
- Coordinates: 48.82°N 21.85°E
- Country: Slovakia
- Region: Košice Region
- District: Michalovce District
- First mentioned: 1254

Area
  - Total: 15.80 km^{2} (6.10 sq mi)
- Elevation: 128 m (420 ft)

Population (2025)
  - Total: 1,816
- Time zone: UTC+1 (CET)
  - Summer (DST): UTC+2 (CEST)
- Postal code: 722 1
- Area code: +421 56
- Vehicle registration plate (until 2022): MI
- Website: www.nacinaves.sk

Nacina Ves (Hungarian: Nátafalva) is a village and municipality in Michalovce District in the Košice Region of eastern Slovakia.

== History ==
In historical records the village was first mentioned in 1219. The Hungarian State Archives record that the village was granted by King Bela IV to his son Nata and the name became Natafalva. (Village of Nata) The Natafalusi family were the nobles who controlled the town for hundreds of years, many of them moving after the Kuruc Wars in the early 18th century. In the late 19th century, records indicate that this was a "toth falu" (Slovak village) with a majority Slovak population, but with a sizeable Hungarian minority. After Hungary was partitioned in 1920, Natafalva found itself in the newly created Czechoslovakia. Many Hungarian residents of the town left, immigrating to North America or back to what was left of Hungary. The name was changed from Natafalva to Nacina Ves and during World War II, remaining Hungarians who did not swear that they were Slovaks were expelled.

== Geography ==
The municipality lies at an altitude of 128 metres (420 ft) and covers an area of 15.80 km^{2} (6.10 sq mi) (2025).

== Transport ==
The village has three bus stops with bus shelters. Regular bus routes available include to Michalovce, Strážske, Humenné and Vranov nad Topľou.

Nacina Ves also has its own small railway station, located west of the village, next to the local railway line between Michalovce and Humenné (part of the ŽSR regional line no. 191 between Michaľany and Lupków).

== Population ==
Population statistic (10 years)
Year	1995	2005	2015	2025
Count	1693	1737	1789	1816
Difference		+2.59%	+2.99%	+1.50%

Population statistic
Year	2024	2025
Count	1841	1816
Difference		−1.35%

It has a population of 1816 people (31 December 2025).

=== Ethnicity ===
Census 2021 (1+ %)
Ethnicity	Number	Fraction
Slovak	1741	96.29%
Romani	43	2.37%
Not found out	41	2.26%
Total	1808	

In year 2021 was 1808 people by ethnicity 1741 as Slovak, 43 as Romani, 41 as Not found out, 11 as Other, 8 as Czech, 8 as Rusyn, 3 as English, 2 as Ukrainian, 1 as Italian and 1 as Austrian.

Note on population: The difference values of population numbers in the table "Population statistic" and in the sections "Ethnicity" & "Religion" is caused by the use of various statistical methods.

=== Religion ===
Census 2021 (1+ %)
Religion	Number	Fraction
Roman Catholic Church	1157	63.99%
Greek Catholic Church	427	23.62%
None	86	4.76%
Not found out	55	3.04%
Eastern Orthodox Church	42	2.32%
Total	1808	

In year 2021 was 1808 people by religion 1157 from Roman Catholic Church, 427 from Greek Catholic Church, 86 from None, 55 from Not found out, 42 from Eastern Orthodox Church, 11 from Evangelical Church, 10 from Calvinist Church, 9 from Jehovah's Witnesses, 7 from Christian Congregations in Slovakia, 3 from Ad hoc movements and 1 from Other.

== See also ==
- List of municipalities and towns in Michalovce District
- List of municipalities and towns in Slovakia
