= Vellan =

Vellan ولان
- Village
- Location within Iran
- Coordinates: 28°36′02″N 61°01′43″E
- Country: Iran
- Province: Sistan and Baluchestan
- County: Khash
- Bakhsh: Nukabad
- Rural District: Taftan-e Jonubi

Population (2006)
  - Total: 486
- Time zone: UTC+3:30 (IRST)
  - Summer (DST): UTC+4:30 (IRDT)

Vellan (Persian: ولان, also Romanized as Vellān and Valān; also known as Varaj and Waraj) is a village in Taftan-e Jonubi Rural District, Nukabad District, Khash County, Sistan and Baluchestan Province, Iran. At the 2006 census, its population was 486, in 119 families.
