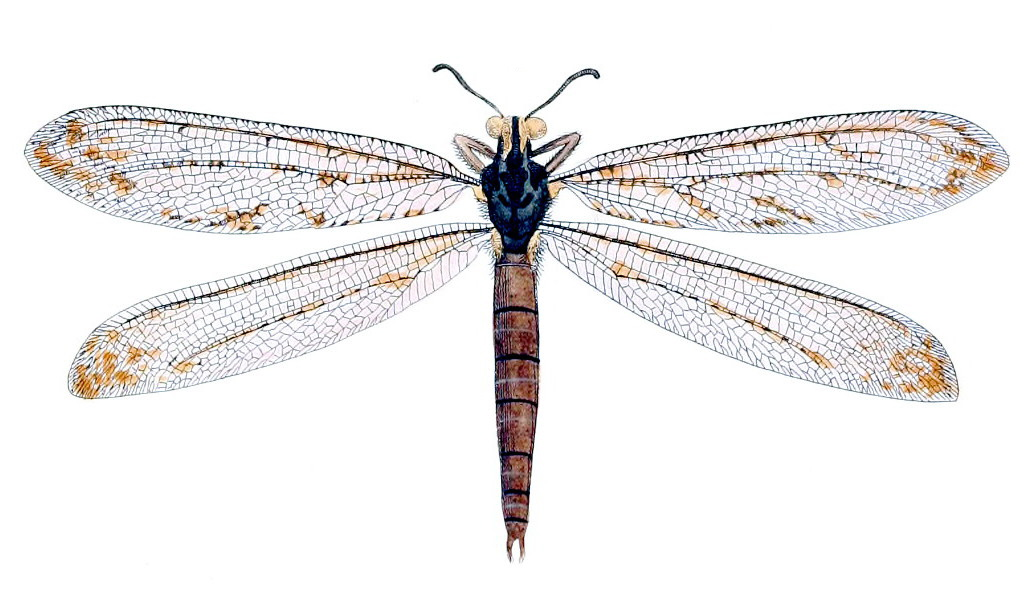
- Vella americana

Scientific classification
- Domain: Eukaryota
- Kingdom: Animalia
- Phylum: Arthropoda
- Class: Insecta
- Order: Neuroptera
- Family: Myrmeleontidae
- Subfamily: Myrmeleontinae
- Tribe: Acanthaclisini
- Genus: Vella; Navas, 1913

= Vella (insect) =

Genus of insects

Vella is a genus of antlions in the family Myrmeleontidae. There are about five described species in Vella.

== Species ==
These five species belong to the genus Vella:

- Vella americana (Drury, 1773)^{i c g b}
- Vella assimilis (Banks, 1908)^{i c g}
- Vella eggerti Esben-Petersen, 1928^{i c g}
- Vella fallax (Rambur, 1842)^{i c g b}
- Vella flaccida Navás, 1917^{i c g}

Data sources: i = ITIS, c = Catalogue of Life, g = GBIF, b = Bugguide.net

== Gallery ==
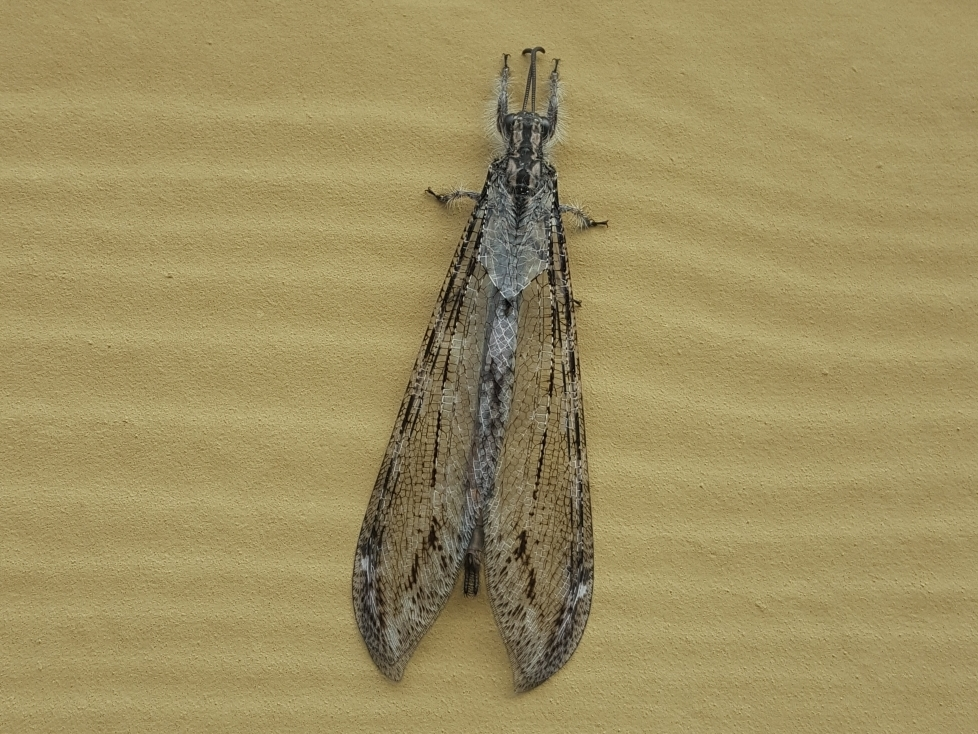
V. americana in Florida.

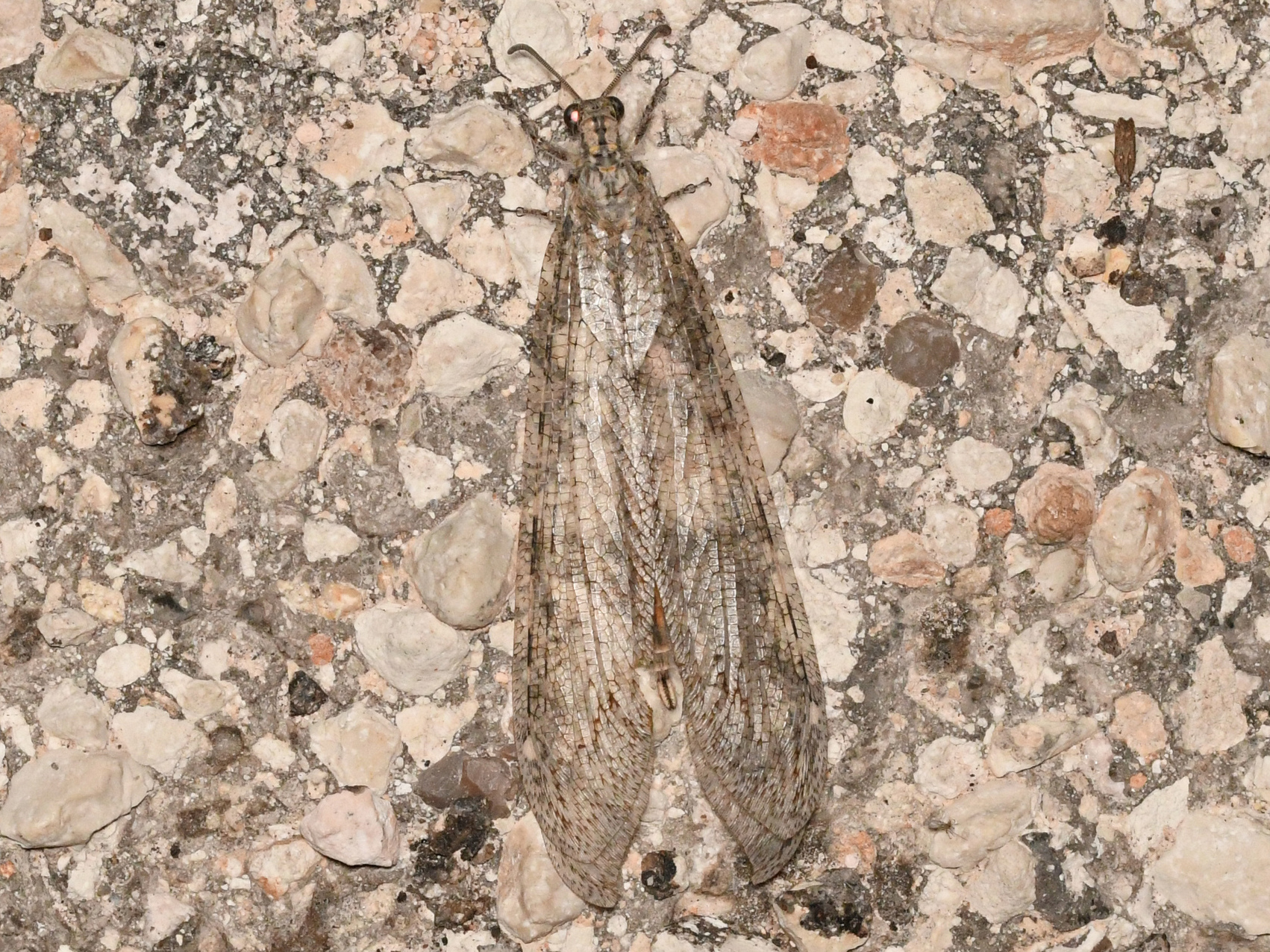
V. eggerti in the Dominican Republic.

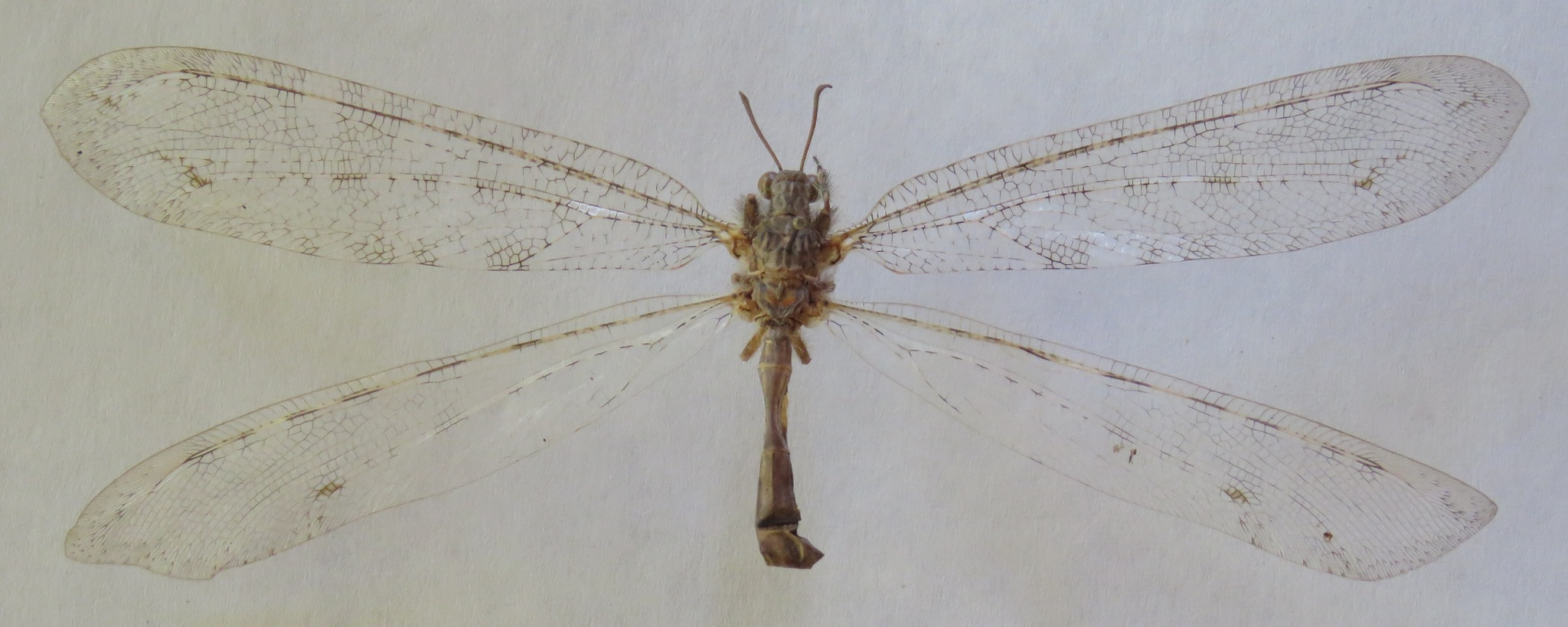
V. fallax fallax collected in Nicaragua.

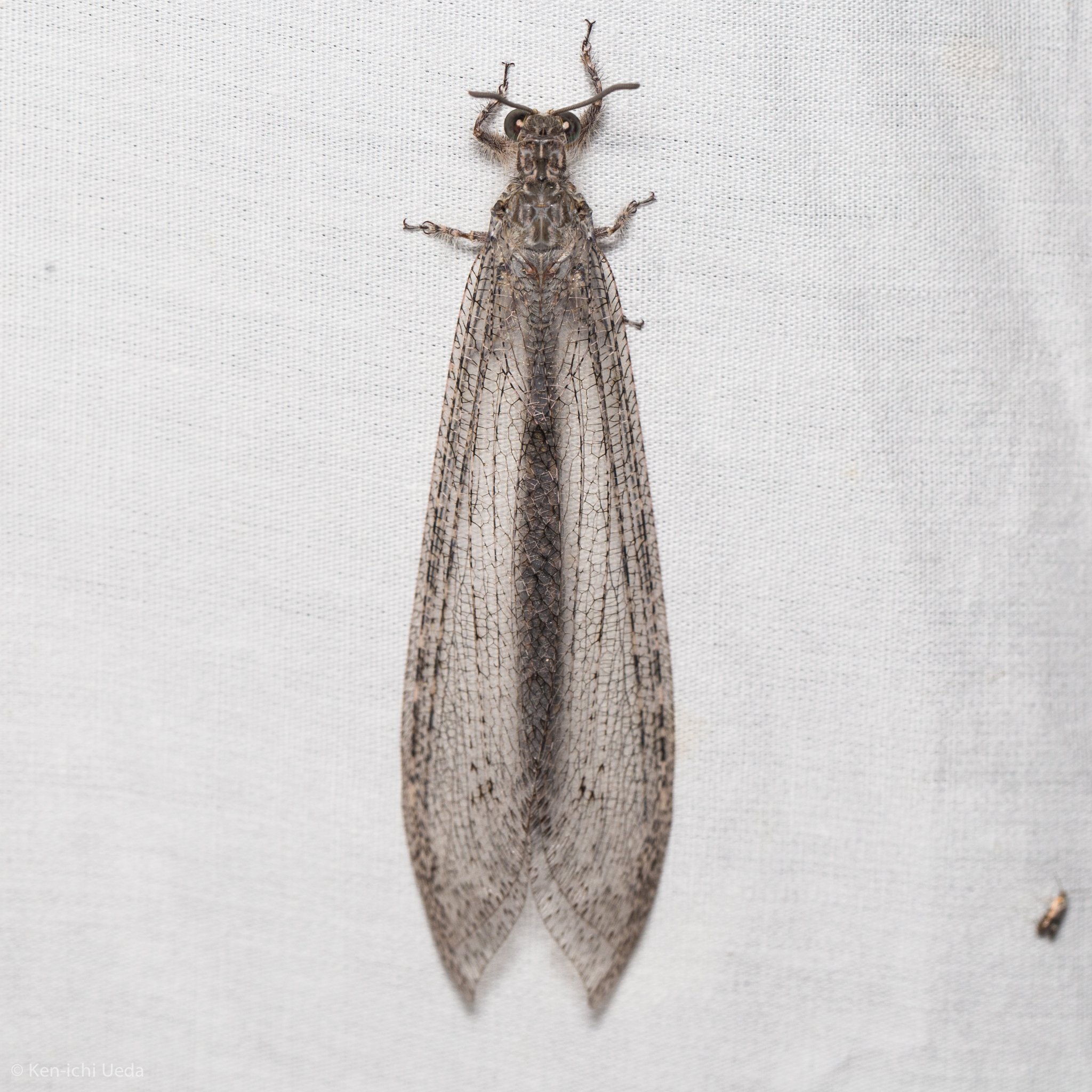
V. fallax texana in Arizona.
