= Vallum (disambiguation) =

A vallum is the whole or a portion of the fortifications of a Roman camp.

Vallum may also refer to:

- Vallum (anatomy), a portion of the human tongue
- Vallum (Hadrian's Wall), a huge earthwork which runs from coast to coast to the south of Hadrian's Wall

== See also ==
- Valium
- Vellum
