= Valor =

Valor, valour, or valorous may mean:

- Courage, a similar meaning
- Virtue ethics, roughly "courage in defense of a noble cause"

== Entertainment ==
- Valor Kand, a member of the band Christian Death
- Valor (TV series), an American drama series
- Valor (DC Comics), a DC Comics superhero
- Valor (EC Comics), an EC Comics title

== Sports ==
- Washington Valor, American football team
- Team Valor International, an American Thoroughbred horse racing stable
- Valour FC, a Canadian soccer club

== Other ==
- Bell V-280 Valor, U.S. army tiltrotor aircraft
- Valor Communications, the former name of Windstream Communications, a telecommunications company
- Valor Ecclesiasticus, a survey of the finances of the church in England, Wales and English-controlled parts of Ireland made in 1535
- Yale & Valor, a UK-based gas boiler manufacturer
- Carnival Valor, a Conquest-class cruise ship operated by Carnival Cruise Line
- HMS Valorous, the name of more than one ship of the British Royal Navy
- Team Valor, a team on Pokémon Go
- Valoren number, the analog of ISIN security identifiers for Switzerland

== See also ==
- Válor, a municipality in Spain
- Valar, figures on J. R. R. Tolkien's legendarium
- Velour, a plush, knitted fabric or textile
