= Versatile Laboratory Aid =

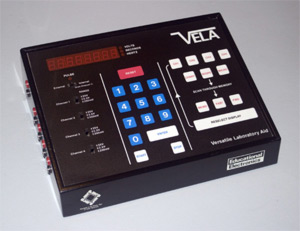
- Type: Laboratory instrumentation
- Released: circa. 1981
- Introductory price: GBP £ 472.50 (1982)
- Discontinued: early 1990s
- Units sold: over 4000
- CPU: Motorola MC6802 @ 1MHz
- Memory: 4 kB RAM + up to 16 kB ROM
- Connectivity: 1× Motorola MC6821 PIA Digital Out, Power, Scope out, Sync out, +5v 70mA out, 4× Analog In, Pulse, 2× 1.25v Pulse

The Versatile Laboratory Aid (VELA) is a 4-channel data logging tool that was created as part of a joint venture by Ashley Clarke, Keith Jones and David Binney of Leeds University and Educational Electronics. The VELA was designed to be used as a stand-alone data logger that could be used out in the field and it could then be taken back to the laboratory where it could be connected to a chart printer, oscilloscope or microcomputer for data analysis purposes.

The VELA was designed and built with the intention that it would be used in schools and Universities to monitor Physics and Chemistry experiments as it could be attached to all manner or analogue probes and sensors such as pH meters, temperature sensors, light gates, Signal generator and microphones. Each of the VELA's four channels can be independently set to record voltages in the ranges of +/–250mV, +/–2.5V and +/–25V allowing a range of different input devices to be connected simultaneously.

The basic VELA carries a single 4KB EPROM (ISL1 or ISL1*) which contains the basic input and output routines that handle the keyboard input and 8-digit LED display output together with seventeen user selectable programs which range from a 4-channel digital volt meter to a random event monitor which could be used with a Geiger Counter Probe to measure and log radiation levels from a source material.

In total, the VELA could record a maximum of 4096 data points either from one channel or split equally between the four channels depending on the selected monitoring program. In later versions of the VELA firmware (ISL1*), the number of data points was reduced by 7 bytes per data channel as these bytes were reserved for storing channel and program configuration data when transferring data to a microcomputer.

== Hardware specifications ==
The VELA went through at least two hardware revisions going from the Mark I to Mark II and subsequently the VELA PLUS but the ISL ROMs remained compatible between all three devices although the Mark I VELA required a daughter board to carry the extra ROMs that were developed after the VELA's initial release.

=== Mark I Specifications ===
The VELA Mark I was based around the Motorola MC6802 central processor and carried 4KB of RAM. It shipped with the original ISL1 ROM fitted and has space for a further 2 ROMs to be fitted on board. The PCB of the Mark I was split into two parts which connected to each other through a ribbon cable. The ROMs were generally shipped on 2732 EPROM chips and they could be sent back to Educational Electronics to be updated with enhanced firmware when it became available.

=== Mark II Specifications ===
The VELA Mark II was a refinement to the Mark I design and was based on the same processor and hardware. The Mark II PCB was condensed onto a single board and carried space for a further three EPROM's to be fitted in addition to the ISL1* EPROM that it shipped with. There were modifications to the connectors on the VELA Mark II with the addition of a 5V 70mA output and a revised power supply connector although early Mark II VELA's continued to use the original 3.5mm power supply plug socket as used on the VELA Mark I.

=== VELA PLUS Specifications ===
The VELA PLUS was again a refinement on the Mark II VELA and the PCB carried alterations to the op-amps and circuitry associated with the channel inputs. The VELA front panel was also revised to make it clearer to understand as the usability of the VELA had been a source of issues amongst the teaching community.

With the advent of the VELA PLUS, the name Versatile Laboratory Aid which was displayed on the front panel was changed to Versatile Laboratory Instrument whilst retaining the VELA contraction.

== Use in education ==
The VELA was 50/50 subsidised by the DTI, an arm of the British Government to encourage take up within the education sector and many thousands of VELA units were sold to schools.

In 1986 an article in the Electronic Systems News Spring Journal stated "4000 teachers now possess a VELA, but it is suspected that more than half of these have never been used."

== Connectivity ==
The VELA was designed to be connected to three different types of device, being a chart printer, an oscilloscope or a microcomputer. Connecting the VELA to a chart printer allowed the captured data to be printed directly from the VELA for analysis and making a permanent record of the data captured. Connecting the VELA to an oscilloscope allowed users to have a real-time view of the data the VELA was recording or a playback view of pre-existing captured data. When connected to a microcomputer, the data captured could be stored and manipulated using a variety of different software applications that were available for the VELA.

Using the Digital Out port, the VELA can also be used as a control device using 8 of the 16 data lines provided.

=== Available Software ===
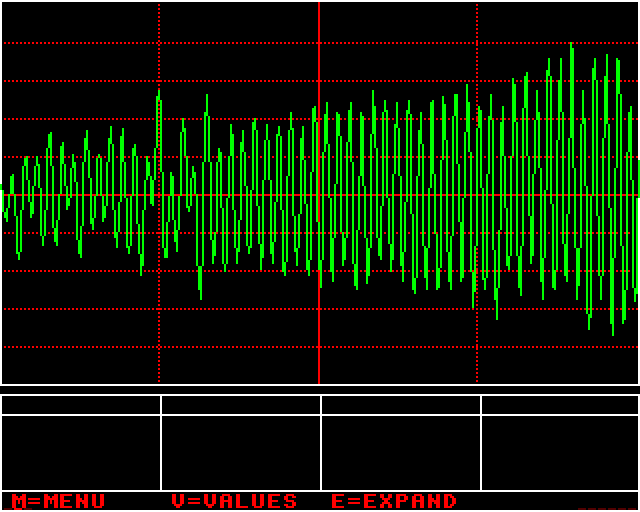
VELAnalysis version 1.3 displaying a wave form of a Whistle as captured by VELA

Software was produced for several microcomputers including the Apple II, BBC Micro, Commodore PET, Commodore 64, Research Machines 380Z and early IBM-PC compatible. A partial list of known software titles is listed below.

Software Title	Supplier	Platform	Price
VELAnalysis III	Educational Electronics	BBC Micro/Apple II/IBM PC compatible	£30 (GBP)
Statpack	Thomas Nelson and Sons Ltd	BBC Micro/RM 380Z	£30 (GBP)
VELAdisc+	Instrumentation Software Ltd	BBC Micro/RM 380Z	£25 (GBP)
Acklam Graphpack	Instrumentation Software Ltd	RM 380Z	£22 (GBP)
Utilities Disc	Instrumentation Software Ltd	BBC Micro	£28 (GBP)
X-Y Graphing	Instrumentation Software Ltd	BBC Micro	£20 (GBP)
Graph Plot	Science Education Software Ltd	BBC Micro	£12 (GBP)
VELA Software	Bunglesoft	BBC Micro	£15 (GBP)
Integrated Science Programs	Philip Harris	BBC Micro	Unknown
VELAcom	Satchel Software	IBM-PC with MS-DOS	Unknown
VELAd	John Taylor Teacher's Centre	Unknown	Unknown
VelaXFER	retro-kit.co.uk	BBC Micro	FREE
