= Velar (caste) =

Tamil artisan caste from south Indian state Tamil Nadu

Regions with significant populations
- Tamilnadu

Languages
- Tamil

Religion
- Hindu

Velar is a Tamil artisan caste whose members traditionally pursued pottery and trade in the Indian state of Tamil Nadu. They are officially classified as Kulala or Velar. They belong to the Other Backward Class group.

== Etymology ==
The word Vel refers to earth. Velar means "those of the earth".

== History ==
Velars are the descendants of the three sons of their original ancestor Kulalan, who was the son of Brahma. Kulalan prayed to Brahma to be allowed to create and destroy things daily, so Brahma made him a potter.

== Titles ==
They are subdivided into numerous clans based on Koottamam or Kulam.

Some Tamil-speaking Velar in northern Tamil Nadu and Kongu regions use the title Udayar

Telugu-speaking Kummaras in southern Tamil Nadu use the title Chettiyar. They are relatively recent migrants in the southern region of Tamil Nadu from old Andhra region.

== See also ==
- Vellalar
- Devanga
- Sengunthar
- Kulala
