= List of power stations in Slovakia =

The following page lists power stations in Slovakia.

Current nuclear power plant locations are Jaslovske Bohunice and Mochovce. Other alternative locations planned for construction of nuclear power plants are Vojany (district of Michalovce), Novaky, industrial complex of U.S. Steel Košice, Kecerovce near Kosice, Zehna near Presov, Bahon near Bratislava and Ziar nad Hronom.

== Nuclear ==
Name	Location	Coordinates	Type	Capacity, MWe	Operational	Notes
Bohunice NPP	Jaslovské Bohunice	48.491°N 17.672°E	KS 150	110	1972–1977	shut down after a refuelling incident
		48.491°N 17.672°E	VVER	440	1980–2006	deactivated 2006, being decommissioned
		48.492°N 17.676°E	VVER	440	1981–2008	deactivated 2008, being decommissioned
		48.497°N 17.691°E	VVER	505	1985-	
		48.496°N 17.693°E	VVER	505	1985-	
			AP1000	1250	2045-	under construction 2027–2045
Mochovce NPP	Mochovce	48.261°N 18.457°E	VVER	500	1998-	
		48.259°N 18.457°E	VVER	500	2000-	
			VVER	471	2023-	
			VVER	471	2026-	

== Thermal ==
=== Fossil ===
Name	Location	Coordinates	Capacity, MWe	Units	Fuel	Operational
Nováky Power Plant	Nováky	48.698°N 18.533°E	518	5	brown coal, fuel oil, biomass	1953–2023
Vojany Power Station	Vojany	48.553°N 21.978°E	1 320	12	black coal, fuel oil, natural gas	1966–2024

=== Gas power plants ===
Name	Location	Capacity, MWe	Operator
Malženice Power Plant	Malženice	436	Západoslovenská energetika, a. s. (ZSE)
PPC Bratislava Power Plant	Bratislava	218	
Levice Power Plant	Levice	80	

== Hydroelectric ==
Name	Location	Coordinates	Capacity, MWe	Pumped-storage
Malinec	under construction 2027–2035		2400	yes
Čierny Váh Hydro Power Plant	Čierny Váh	49.008°N 19.912°E	735	yes
Gabčíkovo Hydro Power Plant	Gabčíkovo	47.880°N 17.538°E	720	no
Ipel	planned		600	yes
Liptovská Mara Hydro Power Plant	Vlachy	49.098°N 19.484°E	198	yes
Mikšová Hydro Power Plant	Mikšová	49.192°N 18.508°E	94	no
Nosice Hydro Power Plant	Nosice	49.127°N 18.364°E	68	no
Ružín Hydro Power Plant	Ružín	48.861°N 21.090°E	60	yes
Považská Bystrica Hydro Power Plant	Považská Bystrica	49.133°N 18.453°E	55	no
Dobšiná Hydro Power Plant	Dobšiná	48.855°N 20.383°E	24	yes

Further, many hydro power stations with a total maximum capacity of 50 MW exist.

== See also ==
- List of largest power stations in the world
