= Nuclear power in Slovakia =

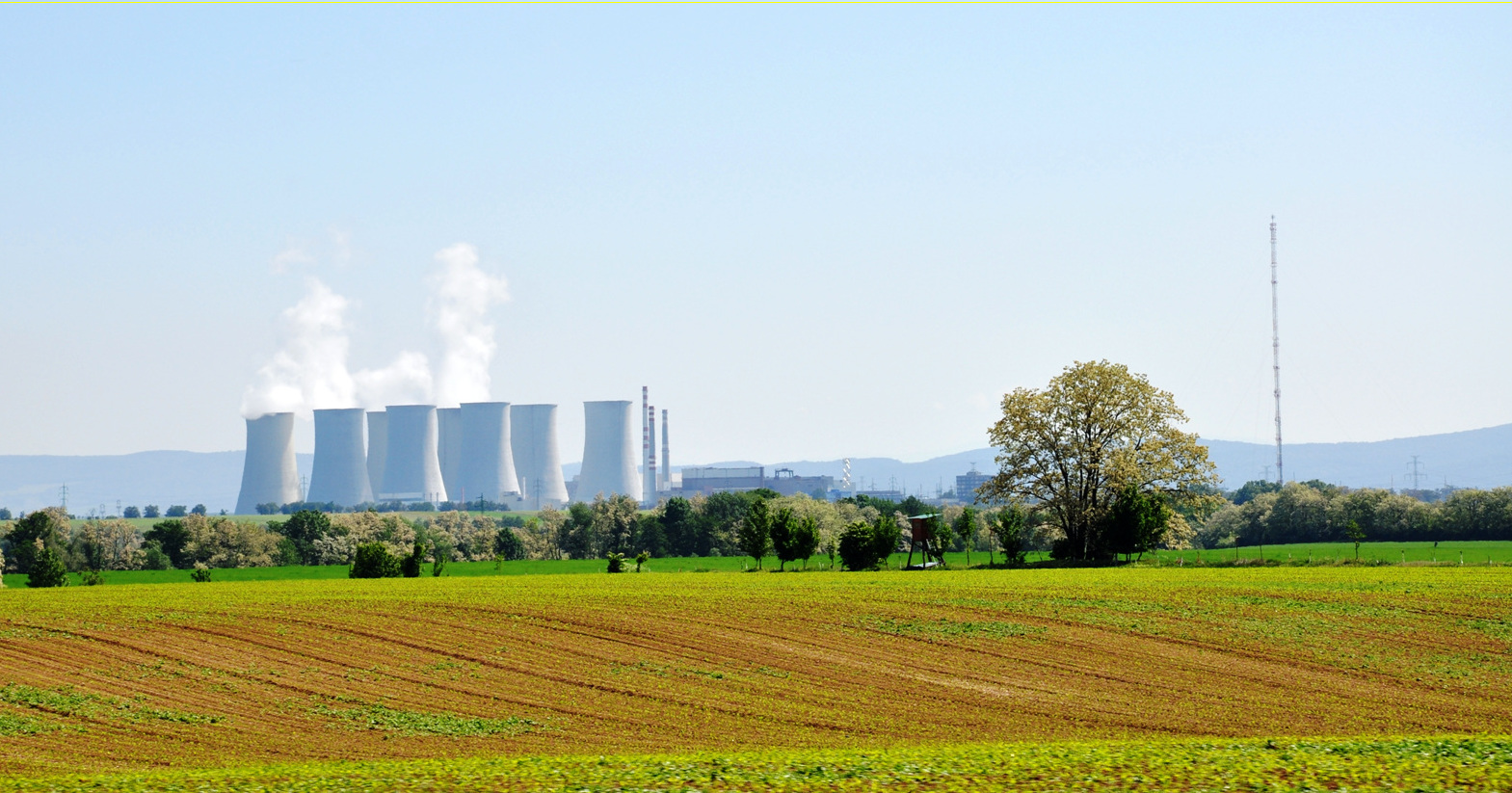
nuclear power plant's cooling chimneys in Jaslovské Bohunice

Nuclear power stations in Slovakia (view)
Active plants

Slovakia has five operational nuclear reactors, with a combined net power capacity of 2,308 MWe, with a sixth coming on line shortly. Within the EU, Slovakia is one of the pro-nuclear Visegrád Group nations.

The country currently operates two nuclear power plants - Bohunice Nuclear Power Plant and Mochovce Nuclear Power Plant. Bohunice was the first nuclear power plant to be built in former Czechoslovakia, with its first unit (A1) coming online in 1972. Mochovce is currently the most powerful plant in the country with a nameplate capacity of 1 411 MWe.

In 2025, nuclear power produced 64% of the country’s electricity. Once Unit 4 at Mochovce becomes operational this number is expected to rise to over 75%.

== History ==
Slovakia’s nuclear energy development has been driven by political strategy and economic necessity rather than purely technical factors. During the communist era, Czechoslovakia sought energy independence from Western imports, leading to the construction of the Bohunice A1 reactor in the 1960s. However, a major accident in 1977 forced its shutdown, prompting the government to rely on Soviet-designed VVER reactors at Bohunice NPP V1 and V2, reflecting the country’s strong political and economic ties to the Soviet Union. By the late 1980s, the government initiated the Mochovce Nuclear Power Plant project to further strengthen energy security. However, after the dissolution of Czechoslovakia in 1993, Slovakia faced financial difficulties, delaying completion. The government prioritized finishing Mochovce but lacked funding. Western financial aid, particularly from the European Bank for Reconstruction and Development (EBRD), helped restart the project, though it came with conditions, such as safety upgrades and alignment with European Union regulations. Units 1 and 2 were completed in 1998 and 2000.

By the late 1990s, nuclear power dominated Slovakia’s energy sector, ensuring energy security. However, as Slovakia pursued EU membership, political pressure mounted to shut down older Soviet-era reactors. Despite domestic opposition, Slovakia agreed to close Bohunice V1 in the 2000s as part of EU accession negotiations, marking a controversial shift influenced by international politics rather than national energy needs.

== Reactors ==
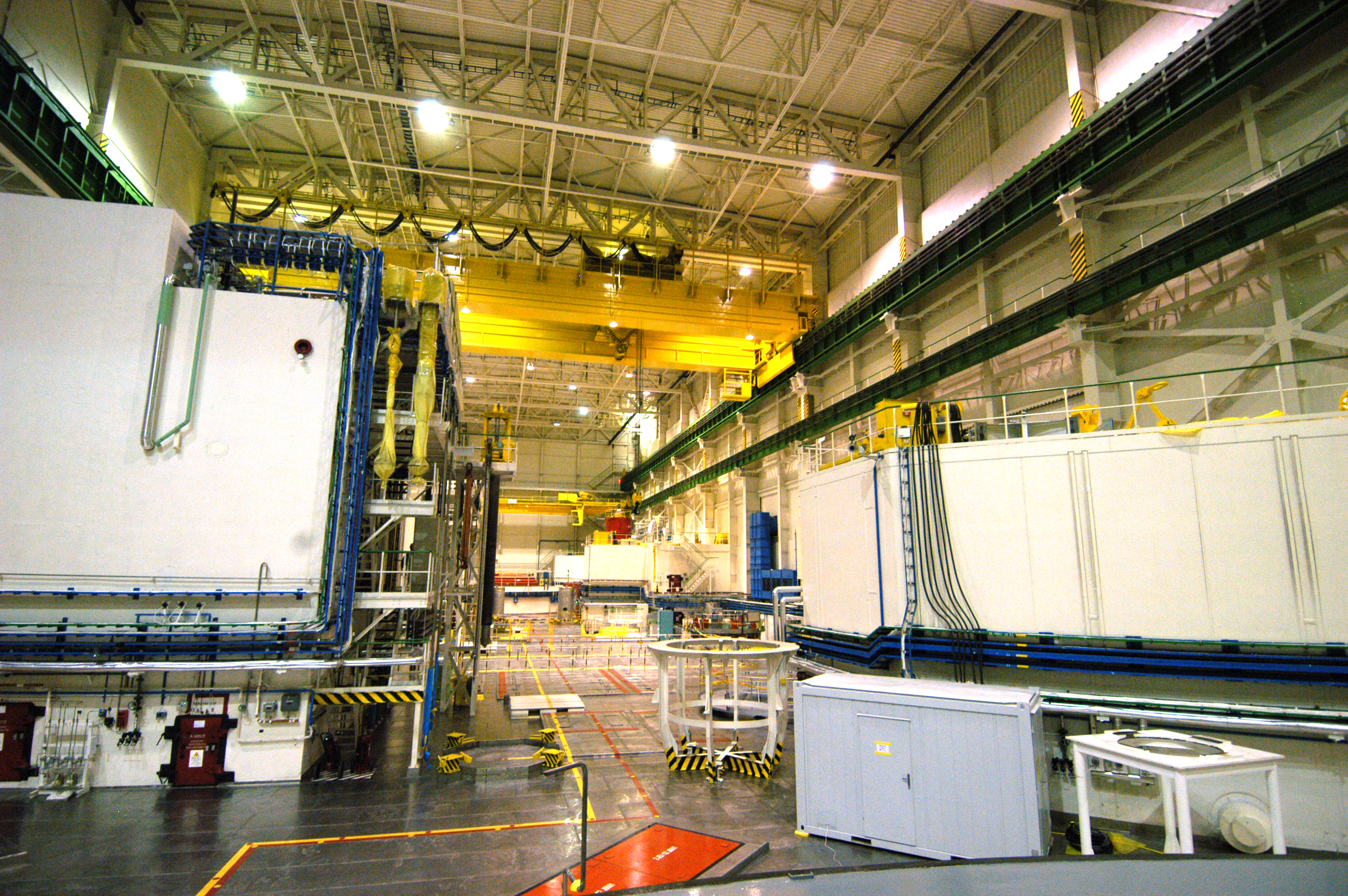
Mochovce NPP

Two V-213 reactors, designed by Atomenergoproekt and built by Skoda are currently operational at the Bohunice V2 plant. The V2 units construction began in 1976 and commenced operation in 1984 and 1985 and each provide 466 MWe.

In 1982 construction on two units of the planned four-unit Mochovce nuclear power plant was commenced by Skoda, using VVER-440 V-213 reactor units, they were commissioned between 1998 and 1999. Originally 440 MWe, they were upgraded in 2008 to 470 MWe.

The government of Slovakia has been committed to nuclear power, and two new reactors began construction at MNPP in 1987, but were suspended in 1992. The project reactivated in 2009.

The two new reactors at Mochovce have a net electrical capacity of 471 MWe each. Enel, an Italian power company and 50% shareholder of Slovenske Elektrarne, initially planned an investment of €1.6 billion for the completion of the MNPP units 3 and 4 by 2011–2012. In January 2006 the Slovak government approved a new energy strategy incorporating these plans, with capacity uprates at MNPP units 1 and 2, and at BNPP units 3 and 4.

Mochovce-3 came on-line in January 2023. Mochovce-4 is due to follow in 2026.

In August 2023 Slovakia signed an agreement to receive nuclear fuel from the American company Westinghouse as a step towards moving away from Russian source fuels. Slovakia is also talking to France's Framatome to work together on the development of a nuclear fuel for VVER-440 pressurised water reactors.

	Reactor type	Power (thermal)	Power (electric)	Construction started	Commenced operations	Status	Notes
Bohunice V-2	2x VVER-440/213	2750 MW	942 MWe	1976	1984	Operational	Only operational unit at Bohunice
Mochovce 1	VVER-440/213	1471 MW	470 MWe	1983	1998	Operational	
Mochovce 2	VVER-440/213	1471 MW	470 MWe	1983	2000	Operational	
Mochovce 3	VVER-440/213	1375 MW	471 MWe	1987	2023	Operational	
Mochovce 4	VVER-440/213	1375 MW	471 MWe	1987	2026 (planned)	Construction complete, undergoing testing	Slated to begin operations in 2026

=== Future development ===
A proposal was put forward in February 2023 for permission to build unit 6 at Bohunice. The new reactor has an expected output of 1,200 megawatts. The utility Slovenske Elektrarne is the commissioner.

In July 2023 an agreement with Westinghouse was signed on the potential deployment of its AP1000 and AP300 small modular reactors in Slovakia.

In 2024, Slovakia approved plans for a new Nuclear reactor at the Jaslovské Bohunice site. The proposed unit, with a capacity of up to 1,200 MW, aims to enhance energy security and self-sufficiency. The government is working on a comprehensive plan to outline suppliers, timelines, and financing by October 2024. Potential international partners, including South Korea, France, and the United States, are being considered for the project. Prime Minister Robert Fico has already engaged in discussions with South Korean officials to explore cooperation. This project reflects Slovakia's ongoing commitment to nuclear energy.

In 2025 it was announced that the Westinghouse AP1000 nuclear reactor would be the best option but final decisions has not been made yet. To this day Westinghouse Electric Company is negotiating with Slovakian side about future realisation of new nuclear block at Bohunice Nuclear Power Plant. This project is named "Nový Jadrový Zdroj" in English: New Nuclear Energy Source. It is estimated that the new reactor would start its energy production in 2040s.

== Reactors deactivated and decommissioned ==
Three reactors have been deactivated.

- 143 MWe Russian-designed KS 150 reactor at the Bohunice A-1 plant. Built by Skoda, completed in 1972 and ran until 1977 when it was closed due to an accident that took place during refuelling.
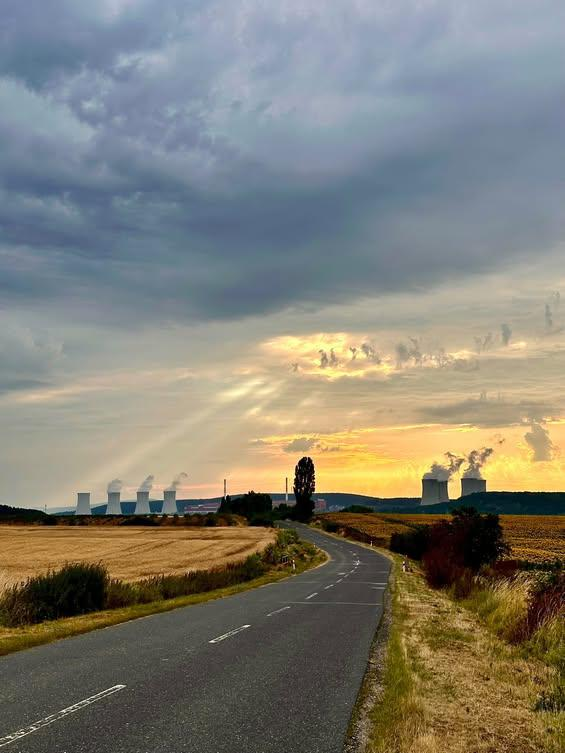
- View over Mochovce Nuclear Power Plant in 2025
  Two VVER-440 V-230 reactors at the Bohunice V1 plant, supplied by Atomenergoexport of Russia and Skoda, completed in 1978 and 1980, closed in 2006 and 2008.

Prior to its accession to the European Union, Slovakia had to shut down two of its older reactors at Bohunice, because they did not meet European safety standards. Although Slovakia spent significant effort to achieve WANO standards, the EU insisted on the shutdowns. The first plant closed 31 December 2006 and the second on 31 December 2008. The closure of these units, prior to the completion of two new reactors has left the country short on power and Slovakia became an energy importer after the first plant was shut down.

At Bohunice, two reactors of the V1 plant have been deactivated. The total cost of decommission and dismantling of Bohunice V1 by 2025 is estimated at €1.14 billion.

The first reactor pressure vessel was removed from Bohunice V1 on June 3, 2020. It is the first decommissioning of a VVER 440 plant to be completed. The process was completed amid health and safety regulations in place to prevent the spread of the coronavirus.

	Reactor type	Power (thermal)	Power (electric)	Construction started	Commenced operations	Closure	Status	Notes
Bohunice A-1	KS 150	770 MW	143 MWe	1958	1972	1977	Undergoing decommissioning	Involved in the 1976 accident
Bohunice V-1/1	VVER-440/230	1375 MW	440 MWe	1972	1978	2006	Undergoing decommissioning	First VVER unit in Slovakia
Bohunice V-1/2	VVER-440/230	1375 MW	440 MWe	1972	1980	2008	Undergoing decommissining	

== Waste disposal ==
Radioactive waste in Slovakia is disposed without reprocessing. The spent fuel stays at the reactor site; however, some spent fuel has been exported to Russia. Slovakia has also begun a search for a high-level waste repository and established a fund with approximately €775 million to build it.

== Gallery ==
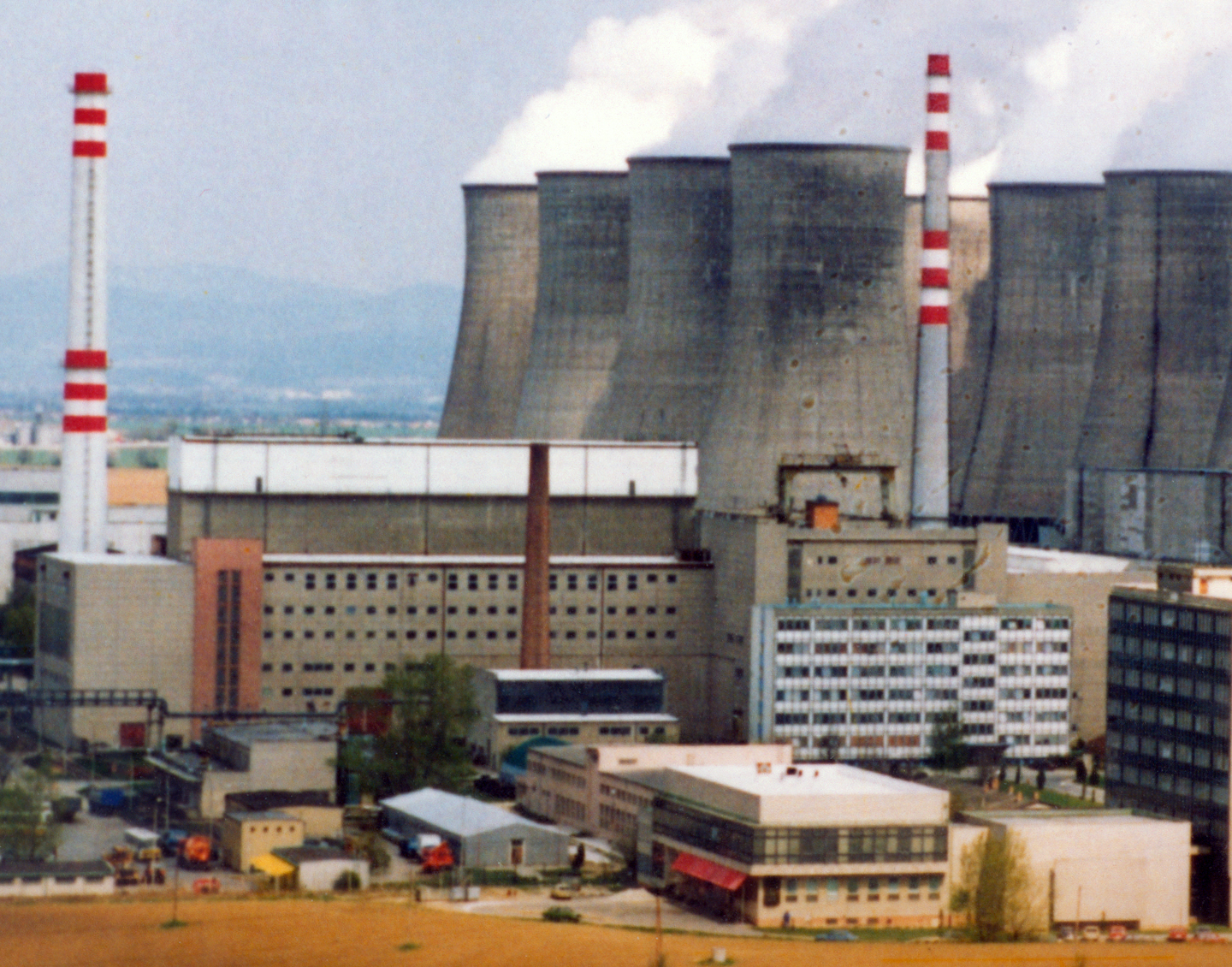
Aerial view of the Bohunice Nuclear Power Plant

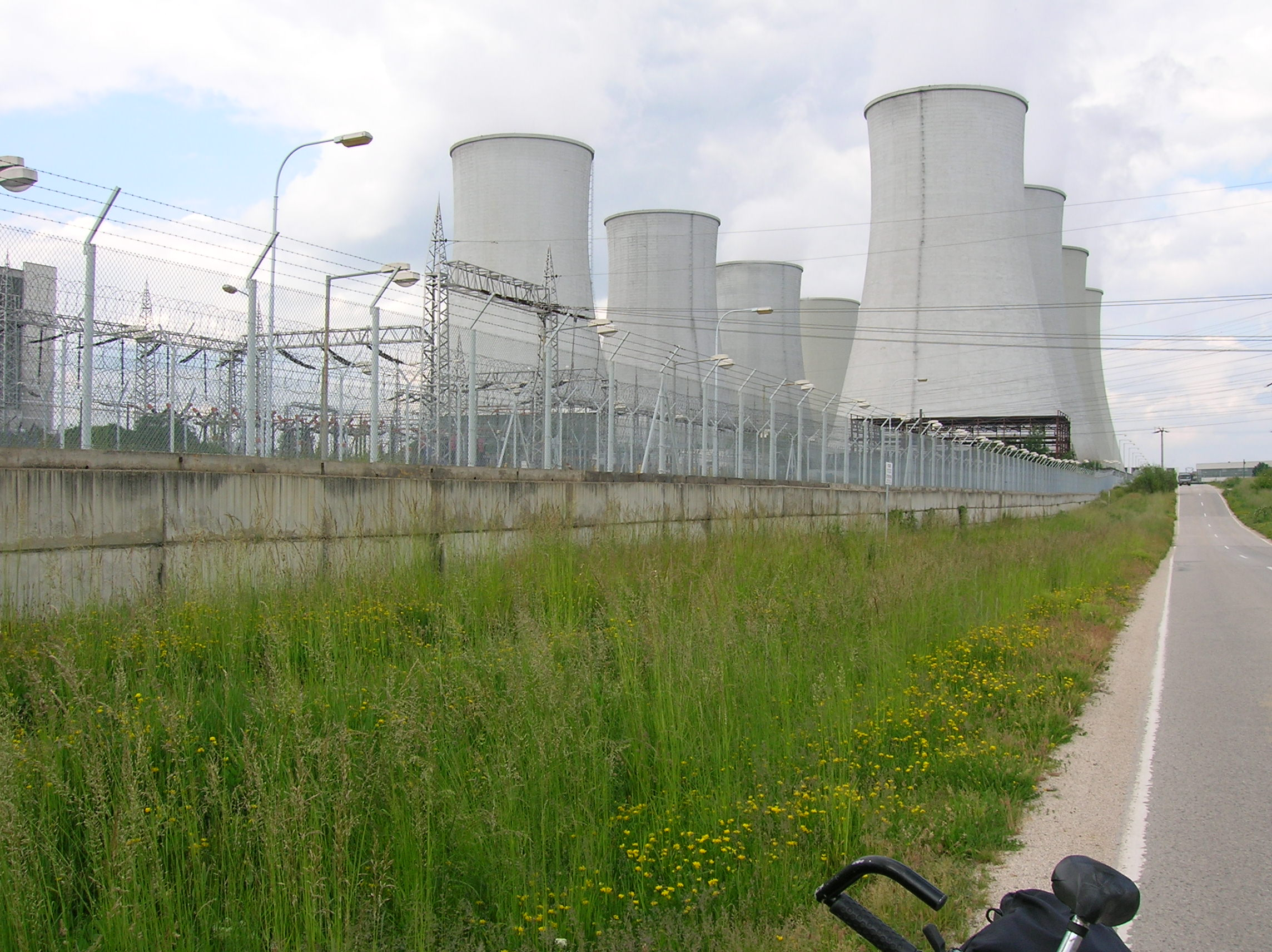
Roadside view of Bohunice

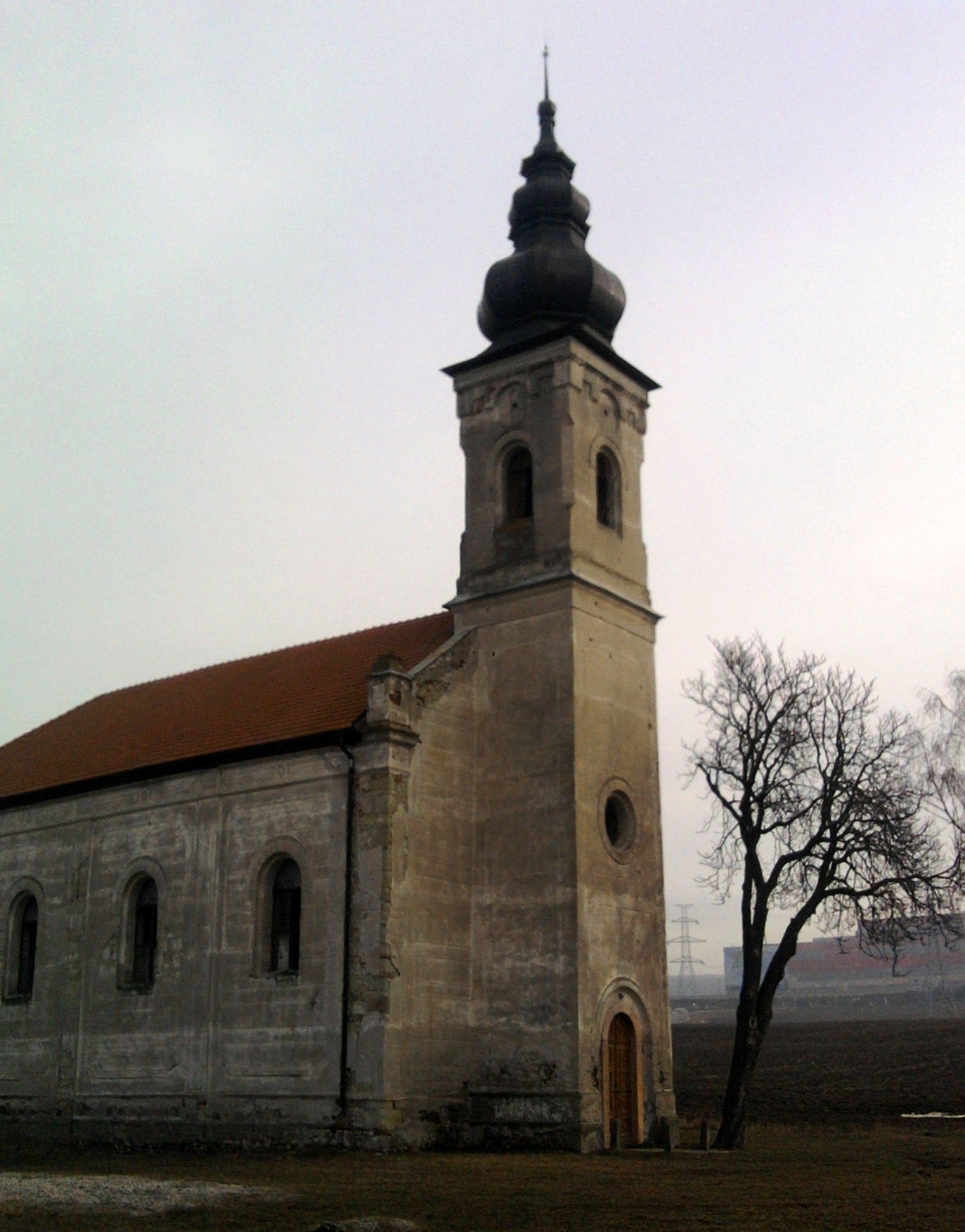
The church at the former village of Mochovce

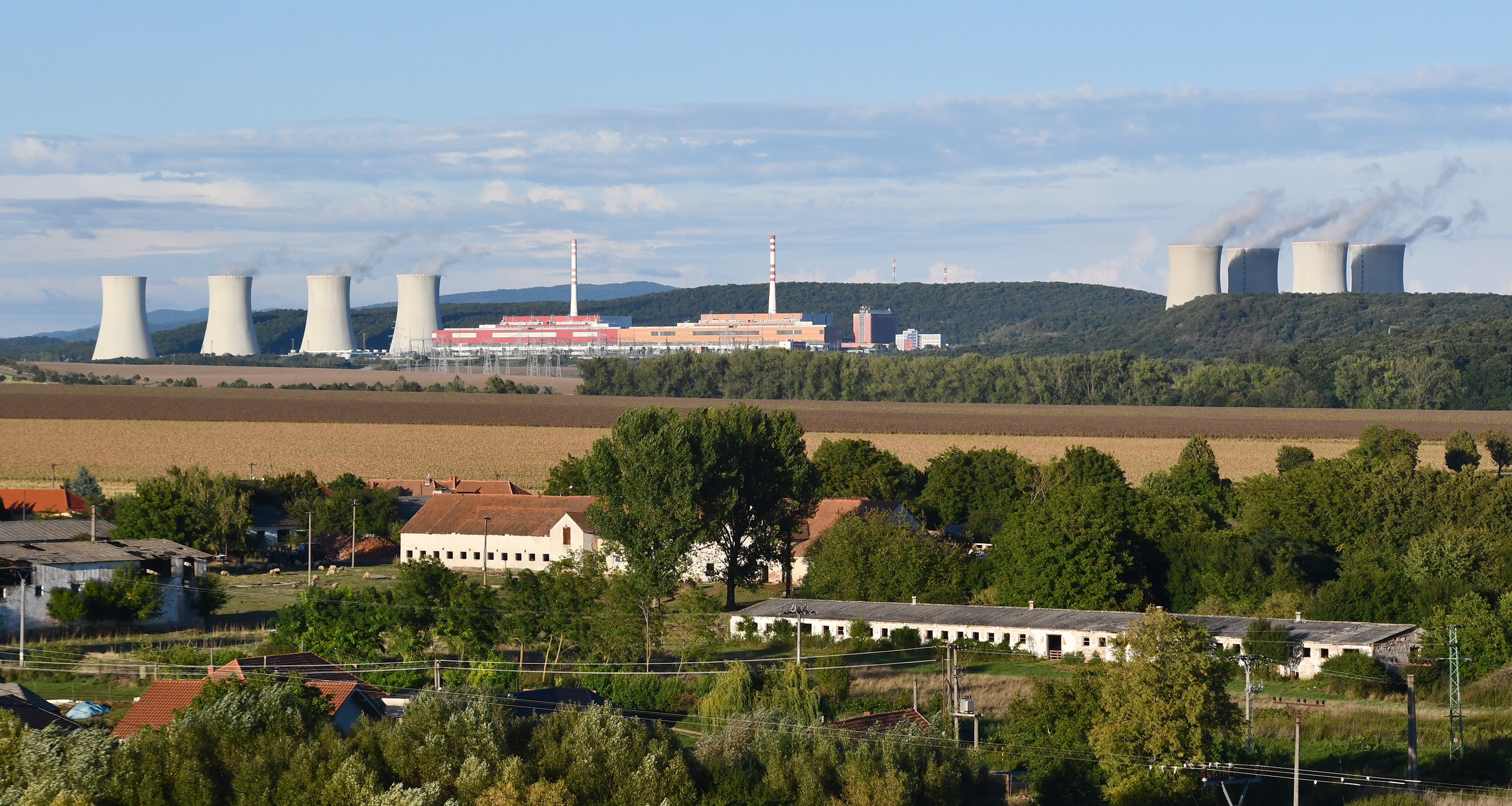
Mochovce Nuclear Power Plant

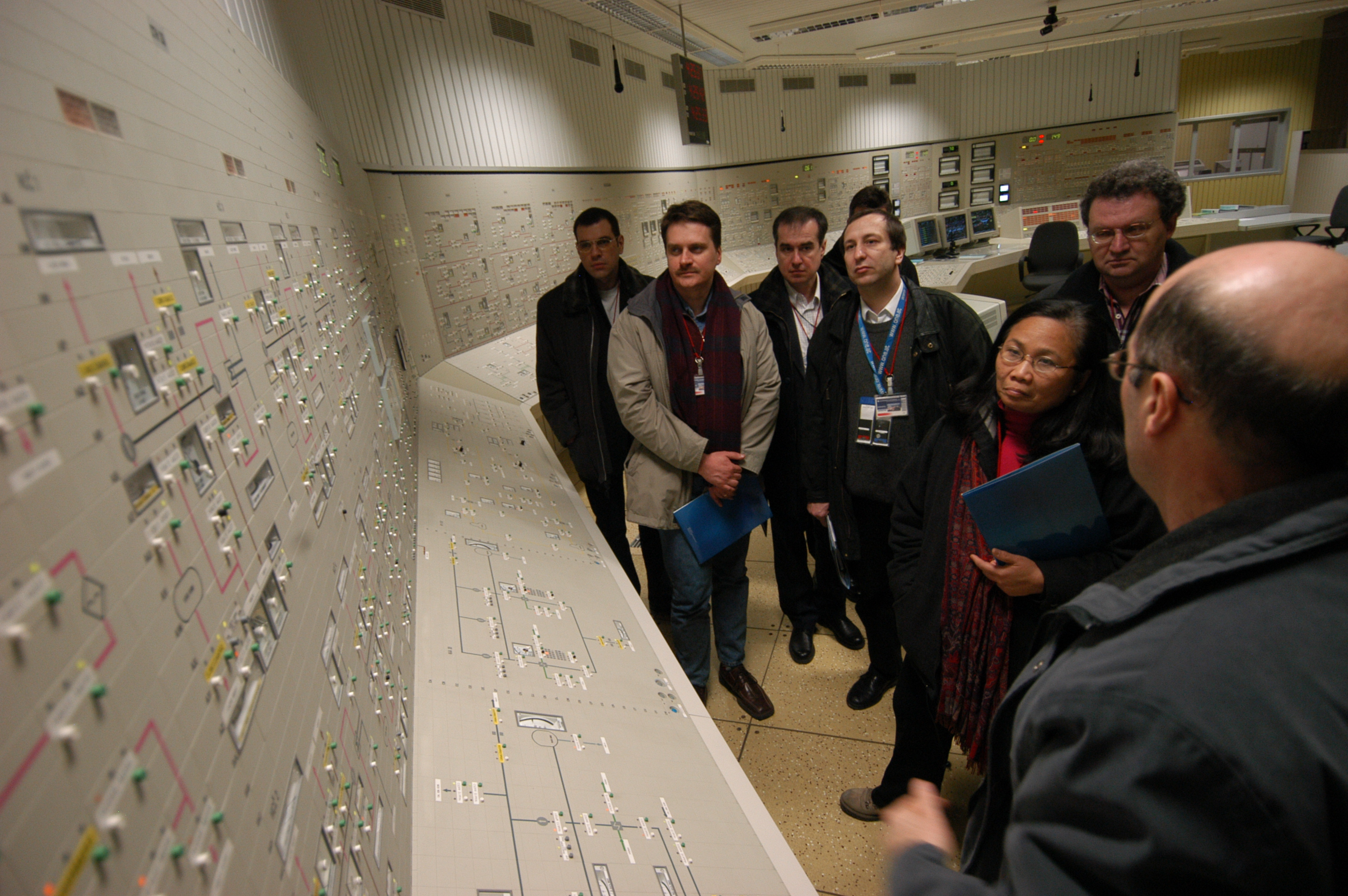
Control room at Mochovce

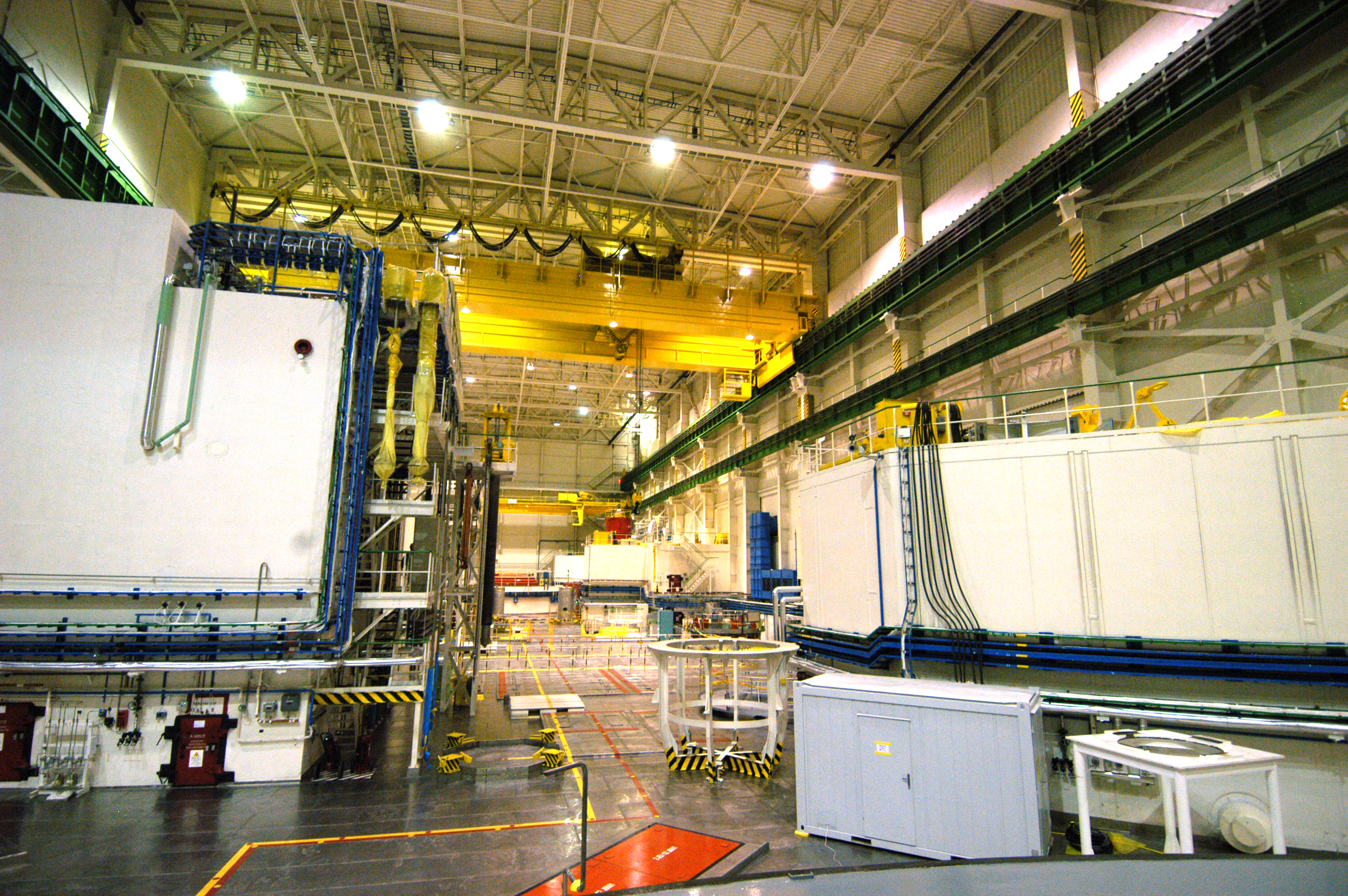
Reactor hall at Mochovce

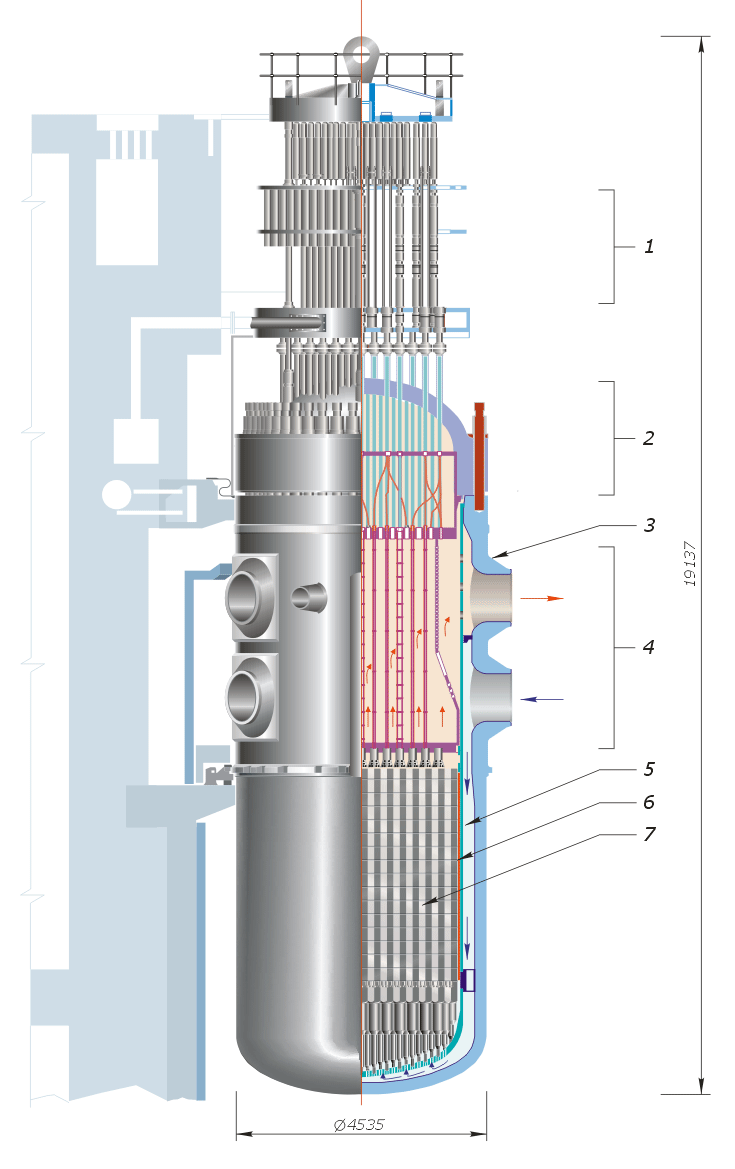
Scheme of a VVER-1000 reactor, similar to the ones currently in service at Bohunice and Mochovce

== See also ==
- List of commercial nuclear reactors#Slovakia
