= Energy in Slovakia =

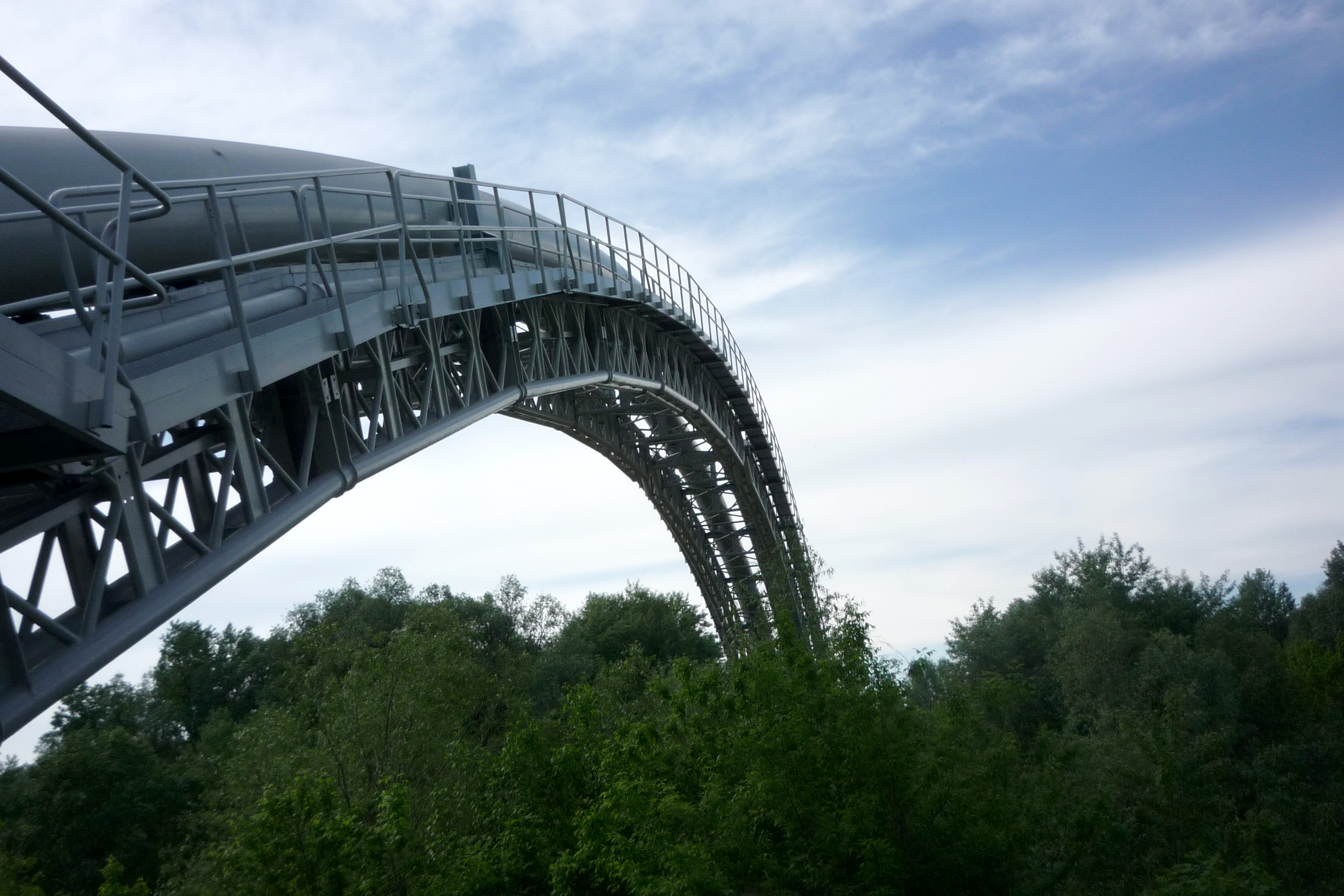
Ižkovce Gas pipeline - panoramio

Primary energy use in Slovakia was 194 TWh and 36 TWh per million inhabitants in 2009.

== Statistics ==
2020 energy statistics

Production capacities for electricity (billion kWh)
Type	Amount
Nuclear	38.18
Fossil fuel	13.58
Hydro	11.58
Biomass	3.86
Wind power	1.90
Solar	1.65
Total	65.75

Electricity (billion kWh)
Category	Amount
Consumption	26.50
Production	27.77
Import	13.29
Export	12.97

Natural Gas (billion m^{3})
Consumption	4.93
Production	0.01
Import	4.36

Crude Oil (barrels per day)
Consumption	85,200
Production	3,800
Import	109,800
Export	100

CO_{2} emissions:
29.04 million tons

== Energy plan ==
Slovakia has a plan to get renewable sources of energy up to 19.2% by 2030.

== Energy types ==
From 2024, following the completion of two new nuclear reactors, Slovakia will return to being a net exporter of electricity.

=== Fossil fuels ===
Slovakia electricity production by source

==== Oil ====
Slovnaft is the largest oil refinery in Slovakia.

In 2022 Slovakia sought to reduce its reliance on oil from Russia.

==== Natural gas ====
Slovenský plynárenský priemysel (Slovak Gas Industry, SPP) is the main natural gas supplier in Slovakia.

In 2022 Slovakia sought to reduce its reliance on natural gas from Russia, which was supplying 81% in 2020.

In order to lower reliance, a gas pipeline interconnector with neighbouring Poland was completed by August 2022 and put into operation in a bilateral opening ceremony on the 26 August 2022.

In 2024, SPP entered into a short-term pilot contract to buy natural gas from Azerbaijan to reduce the impact of the Ukrainian closure of the pipeline for Russian supplies in 2025. Transfer will be by the Trans-Balkan pipeline, or possibly via Russia and the TurkStream pipeline across the Black Sea, then Turkey, Bulgaria, Serbia and Hungary. The contract could be extended into a longer-term deal.

==== Coal ====
Two coal power stations were operated in Slovakia until 2024, with the power station at Nováky closing in 2023, and the power station at Vojany ceasing production in spring 2024. Slovakia currently does not have thermal powerplants in operation and relies on nuclear power generation and power generation from renewables.

=== Nuclear Energy ===
There are five operating reactors in two powerplants. Bohunice Nuclear Power Plant, with two reactors dating from the 1980s, and three reactors at Mochovce Nuclear Power Plant), with two from the 1990s and the 3rd being commissioned in January 2023. Total electricity generation from nuclear sources in 2020 was 15.4 TWh. One additional reactor is near completion at Mochovce.

=== Renewable energy ===
Slovakia renewable electricity production by source

Years in which the last three renewable power levels achieved
Achievement	Year	Achievement	Year	Achievement	Year
5%	2001	10%	2009	15%	2019

Renewable energy includes wind, solar, biomass and geothermal energy sources.

==== Wind power ====
At the end of 2022, wind power capacity in Slovakia constituted 3 MW, a number that has not changed since 2010. In the National Energy and Climate Plan the Government plans to build 500 MW of wind power by 2030.

==== Solar power ====
In 2023 Slovakia had 840 MW of installed solar power capacity.

==== Biomass ====
Biomass provides around 4% of electricity generation capacity.

=== Hydro power ===
There is hydropower potential in the Váh and Orava rivers (before Starý Hrad, and after Kráľoviansky Meander, Oravka tunnel), with hydroelectric powerplants over 30 MW as extremely profitable (for low cost/installed MW).

== Emissions and climate change ==
Emissions of carbon dioxide in total, per capita in 2007 were 6.8 tons CO_{2} compared to EU 27 average 7.9 tons CO_{2}. Emission change 2007/1990 (%) was -35.1%. In Europe in 2007 the Slovak emissions of carbon dioxide per capita (6.8 tons CO_{2}) were higher than in Hungary 5.4, Sweden 5.1, Portugal 5.2 or Switzerland 5.6 and lower than in Czech Republic 11.8, Luxembourg 22.4, Finland 12.2, Netherlands 11.1, Germany 9.7 or Ireland 10.1

1990 emissions were 74 Mt CO_{2}_{eq}. The Kyoto Protocol target is reduction of 6 Mt (-8%).

== See also ==
- 2009 Handlová mine blast
- List of power stations in Slovakia
- Renewable energy by country
- Russia–Ukraine gas disputes
- 2022–2023 Russia–European Union gas dispute
