= Nuclear power in the European Union =

Share of primary energy consumption from nuclear power in Europe

Share of primary energy consumption from nuclear power in the EU over time

As of 2025, Nuclear power in the European Union accounted for approximately 22% of total electricity production and nearly one-third of low-carbon energy production across the EU.

The energy policies of the European Union (EU) member countries vary significantly. As of October 2025, 12 out of 27 countries have operating nuclear reactors. The countries with reactors are: Belgium, Bulgaria, Czech Republic, Finland, France, Hungary, Netherlands, Romania, Slovakia, Slovenia, Spain and Sweden, and with Germany having phased out their nuclear power in April 2023. The United Kingdom (a former member of the European Union with interconnected electricity links with the EU) also operates nuclear reactors.

As of November 2021, 5 member countries jointly urged the European Commission to keep nuclear power out of the EU's green finance taxonomy; namely the countries are Germany, Austria, Portugal, Denmark, Luxembourg. As they collectively comprise less than 19% of the member states & less than 25% of the overall European Union population, they would be unable to block the European Commission's recommendations to include both natural gas and nuclear power within the EU's green finance taxonomy.

== Stress tests ==
Stress tests were developed within the EU in the aftermath of the Fukushima nuclear disaster, with the goal of making all 132 operating European reactors follow the same safety standards and have the same safety level for a range of possible catastrophic events (e.g. earthquake, flooding or plane crash). Most reactors proved well during the tests, with just 4 reactors in 2 countries having less than one hour for reactivating safety systems; however, most reactors will also have to undergo a program of safety upgrades. In 2012, the costs of additional safety improvements were estimated to be in the range of €30 million to €200 million per reactor unit. Thus, the total costs for the 132 reactors operating in the EU could be in the order of €10–25 billion for all NPP units in the EU over the coming years.

== Energy mix ==
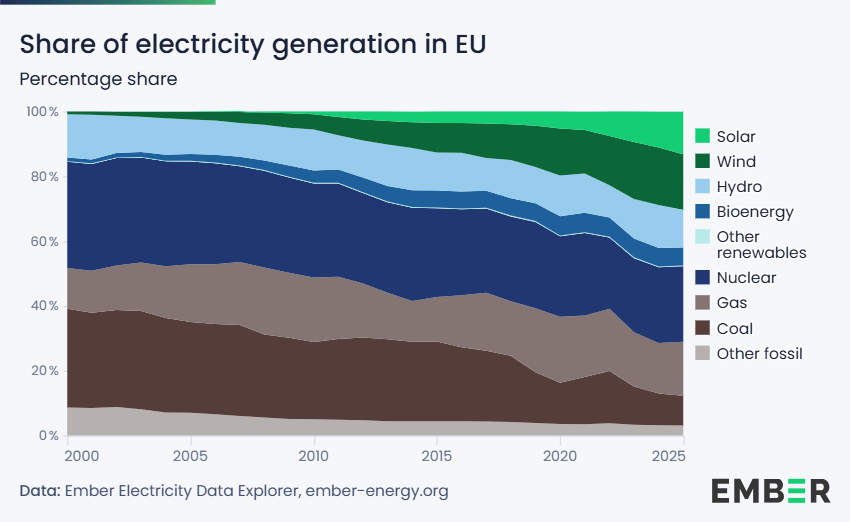
Electricity generation in the EU by source - percentage share

The EU-27 in 2005 satisfied its primary energy consumption with 36.7% oil, 24.6% gas, 17.7% coal, 14.2% nuclear, 6.7% renewables and 0.1% industrial waste. In 2006, nuclear energy provided the largest source (29.5%) of electricity with a production of 990 TWh, and an installed capacity of 134 GWe (17.6% of all installed capacity).

It was the leading electric power source in Belgium, France, Hungary, Lithuania and Slovakia. France, where nuclear is also the largest primary energy source, produced 450 TWh in 2006 – 45% of the EU's total. France alone has the largest nuclear fleet in Europe, with a capacity exceeding 61 GW out of a total of about 105 GW for the European Union. Denmark, Estonia, Ireland, Greece, Italy, Cyprus, Latvia, Luxembourg, Malta, Austria, Poland and Portugal did not produce any nuclear energy.

As of June 2013 there were 131 nuclear reactors in the European Union. 112 units of these are located in eight of the western EU countries. Total nuclear energy generation from EU power plants increased by 25% from 1995 to 2005. The majority of this growth occurred in the 1990s. Installed capacities decreased by 2.6% since 1990 and relative contribution to the overall electricity mix decreased from 30.8% in 1990 to 30.2% in 2005.

In 2019, there were 106 operational reactors, and production decreased by 16%, primarily due to the shutdown of a number of reactors in Germany.

Nuclear power in France usually provides up to 70% of electricity production. Corrosion in several French nuclear reactors, even the most modern type N4, led to long term shutdowns since October 2021. As of early September 2022, 32 of France's 56 nuclear reactors were shut down due to maintenance or technical problems. In 2022, Europe's driest summer in 500 years had serious consequences for power plant cooling systems, as the drought reduced the amount of river water available for cooling. On 6 July 2022, Paris announced that it will nationalise the Électricité de France (EDF) power utility as a result of the escalating energy crisis on the European continent.

== Uranium resources ==
A small amount of uranium mining is conducted in the European Union, however the majority of uranium is imported into the EU. Denmark, through Greenland, contains the majority of uranium deposits of any EU country but in 2021 most uranium mining was banned by Greenland's parliament due to environmental concerns. In a sign of increasing politicisation of uranium mining, Spain proposed a ban in 2020. Since 2001, France no longer has any uranium mines in operation, although continued to own a monopoly on uranium mines in Niger.

The Euratom Supply Agency aims to ensure access to nuclear energy materials for all countries within the European Atomic Energy Community.

== EU-level policy ==
European nuclear policy is governed by the Euratom Treaty. Therefore, regular EU policy on for example environment or the market does not apply to issues in the nuclear field. Nuclear policy is mainly in the competence of the member states. In the EU level, DG ENER is the main authority for EU nuclear issues.

The European Council is the locus for intergovernmental decisions. The European Parliament does not have authority in the field of nuclear policy other than the right to ask questions to the European Commission.

In case of a radiological emergency, the EU will trigger its ECURIE alert system, which immediately notifies all national authorities of an impending nuclear hazard. This system was installed after the experience with the Chernobyl disaster.

The commission's SET plan mentions the "sustainable nuclear fission initiative" to develop Generation IV reactors as one of the research priorities of the European Union.

The European Commission is proposing a stress test for all nuclear power plants in Europe, to prove the nuclear fleet can withstand incidents like those in Fukushima. The European Commission is also proposing tests for countries near the EU that make use of nuclear power.

== Nuclear waste ==
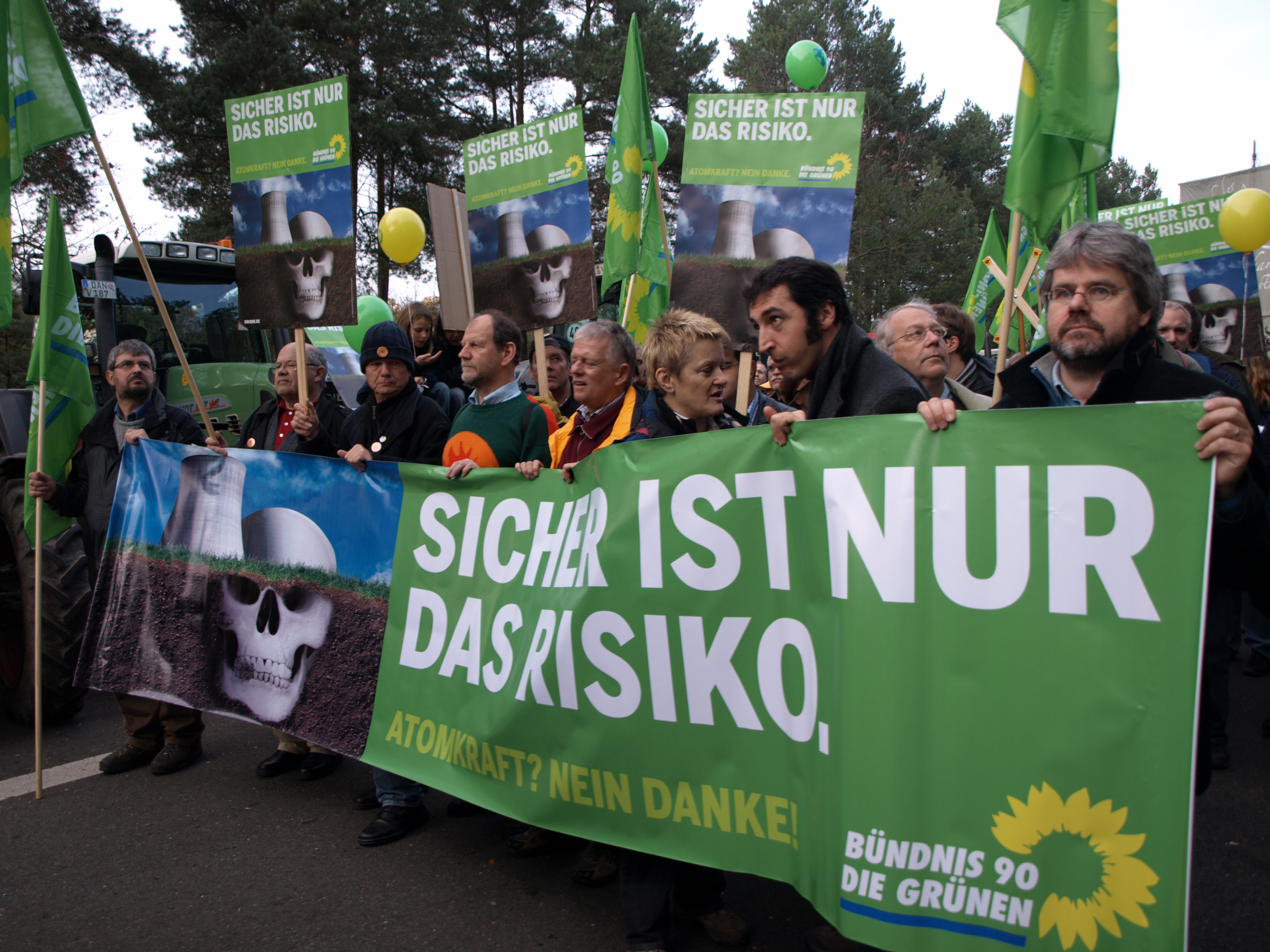
Anti-nuclear protesters of Alliance 90/The Greens party near a nuclear waste disposal centre at Gorleben, in northern Germany, on 8 November 2008. The sign says, "Only the risk is certain. Atomic power? No, thanks!"

On average, the EU creates about 40,000 cubic meters of radioactive waste per year. Eighty percent of that is short-lived low-level radioactive waste. France is currently the only EU country that reprocess waste. The reprocessing is expected to continue in France. The countries that currently use this reprocessed fuel (MOX) include Germany, Belgium, France and Switzerland. Reprocessing spent fuel significantly decreases its volume and extracts plutonium from it. Although plutonium is commonly associated with nuclear weapons, the plutonium extracted with reprocessing is not suitable for 'classic' nuclear weapons.

The EBRD is financing the decommissioning of old nuclear plants in Bulgaria, Lithuania and Slovakia.

EU member states Austria, Ireland, Netherlands, Poland, Slovakia, Bulgaria, Italy, Lithuania, Romania, and Slovenia are working since January 2009 together in the European Repository Development Organisation (ERDO) to address common issues on nuclear waste storage.

ERDO was working early 2010 on a plan to store European nuclear waste somewhere in eastern Europe.

"Some 7,000 cubic meters of high-level nuclear waste are produced across the EU each year. Most Member States store spent fuel and other highly radioactive wastes in above-ground storage facilities that need continuous maintenance and oversight and are at risk of accidents, such as airplane crashes, fires or earthquakes. Hungary and Bulgaria currently ship nuclear waste to Russia."

On 19 July 2011, the European Commission adopted a Directive for regulating and handling nuclear waste in the EU. "Exports to countries outside the EU is allowed under very strict and binding conditions: The third country needs to have a final repository in operation, when the waste is being shipped. Such a repository for highly radioactive waste is internationally defined to be a deep geological repository. At present, such deep geological repositories do not exist anywhere in the world nor is a repository in construction outside of the EU. It takes currently a minimum of 40 years to develop and build one."

The MAX project (2011 to August 2014), funded partly with an almost €3 million European Commission contribution, embodied working on transmuting the waste into less toxic shorter-lived elements. The final report from August 2014 is available. It concludes that one milestone was not achieved.

== Nuclear decommissioning ==
By 2025, it is estimated that over a third of the EU's currently operational reactors will be at the end of their lifecycle and in need of shutdown. At the time of the accession to the EU, Bulgaria, Lithuania and Slovakia agreed to shut down reactors at the sites of Kozloduy, Ignalina and Bohunice respectively: these programs are currently under way. Other decommissioning activities are under way for older reactors, phased out for political reasons (e.g. Italy, Germany) or simply because they reached their end-of-life (e.g. United Kingdom).

In 2016, Reuters reported that the European Commission estimated that the EU's nuclear decommissioning liabilities were seriously underfunded by about 118 billion euros, with only 150 billion euros of earmarked assets to cover 268 billion euros of expected decommissioning costs covering both dismantling of nuclear plants and storage of radioactive parts and waste. Among EU member states still operating nuclear plants, only Britain's operators have enough dedicated assets to cover the expected costs, 63 billion euros, the commission's draft working paper finds. France had the largest shortfall with only 23 billion euros of earmarked assets to cover 74 billion euros of expected costs, while a stress test carried out by Germany's Economy Ministry late last year showed the provisions made by the country's utilities – E.ON, RWE, EnBW and Vattenfall [VATN.UL] – were adequate. Decommissioning costs vary according to reactor type and size, location, the proximity and availability of disposal facilities, the intended future use of the site and the condition of the reactor at the time of decommissioning. Although decommissioning might gradually become cheaper, the cost of final waste depositories is largely unknown and costs could also grow, rather than shrink, over the many decades in question. The European Commission declined to comment on an unpublished document and has not confirmed when the report will be officially published.

== European nuclear industry ==
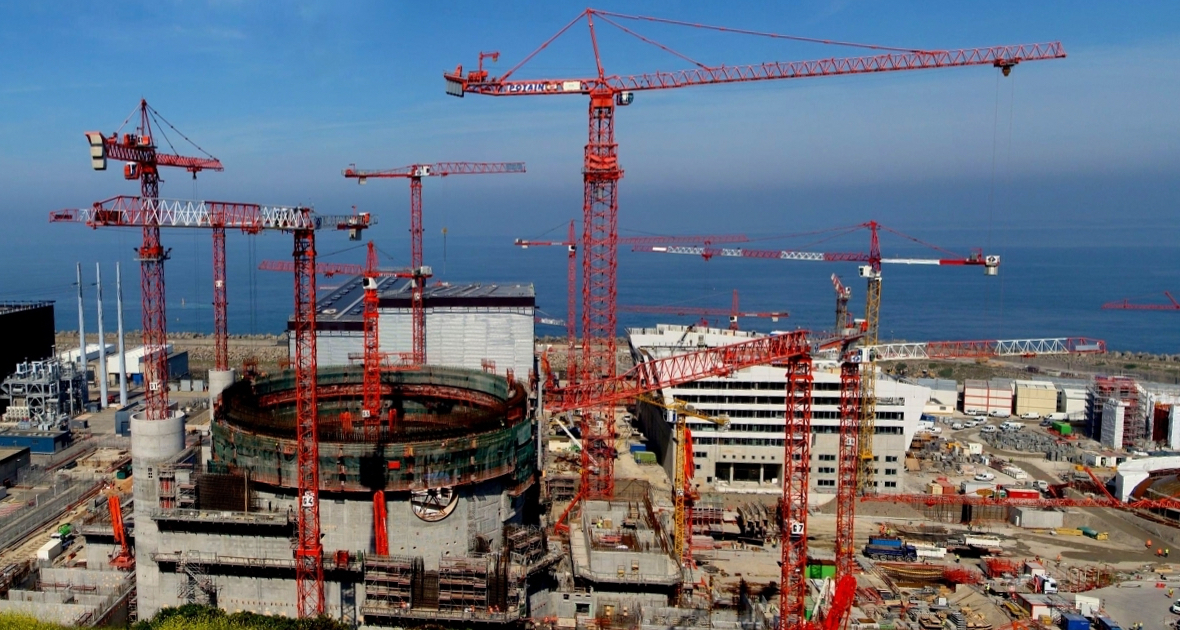
EDF has said its third-generation EPR Flamanville 3 project (seen here in 2010) will be delayed until 2019, due to "both structural and economic reasons," and the project's total cost has climbed to EUR 11 billion in 2012.

Advanced new reactors under construction in Finland and France, which were meant to lead a nuclear renaissance, have been delayed and are running over-budget. There has been a 15-year gap in building reactors, which has meant that there are difficulties in manufacturing the high quality parts required for a reactor. The new reactor also represents an advance over existing technologies, with better reliability and safety over Generation II reactors. Finally, they are "first-of-a-kind" industrial plants, having then all the kinds of problems and delays that should be avoided in following projects.

The European nuclear industry is working to develop Generation IV nuclear reactors. Foratom is a Brussels-based trade organisation that bills itself as the "voice of the nuclear industry".

Along with companies and trade organisations like Foratom, General Electric, Hitachi, and Toshiba are all partners in the European Nuclear Industry. Other partners may include TEPCO from Japan and KEPCO from South Korea. The nuclear industry is regulated by governments and financing is often provided to private contractors who do the work.

Nuclear Safety is an ongoing discussion in the EU. The Western European Nuclear Regulators Association has members from 17 states or European countries. Nuclear safety faces many challenges. WENRA addresses these challenges and commits itself to objective reporting. An example of a report is the 2011 publication, "Stress tests" specifications: Proposal by the WENRA Task Force

== Future plans ==
Currently, nine European countries are building new reactors, or seriously planning to build new ones:

- France
- Finland
- Slovakia
- Poland
- Hungary
- Romania
- Bulgaria
- Czech Republic
- Sweden

Slovenian government has issued an energy permit for building a new nuclear power plant in 2021. Additionally, a 20 years life extension of the existing Krško Nuclear Power Plant is currently underway.

EPR new reactors under construction in Finland and France have been delayed and are running over-budget. Similar problems are for new VVR reactors under construction in Mochovce, Slovakia, which are anyway closing to completion.

Power companies are building nuclear reactors in Finland and France and the French state continues to fund nuclear power, with a €1 billion added to help research for fourth-generation technology and nuclear safety.

Several countries, among the ones owning nuclear power plants, have anyway expanded their nuclear power generation capacity by just upgrading existing reactors. Such upgrades granted from 10% to 29% more power per unit.

Following the Fukushima nuclear disaster, Germany has permanently shut down eight of its reactors and pledged to close the rest by 2022; but difficulties, costs and subsequent critics of planned energy transition could potentially harm this policy. Italy voted twice, in 1987 to make more difficult to build new plants (the vote was extensively interpreted by following governments as a total repeal of nuclear power plants, leading to the sudden shut down of all Italian operating reactors within few years), and in 2011 to keep their country non-nuclear. Switzerland and Spain have banned the construction of new reactors. Belgium is considering phasing out its nuclear plants. France, frequently heralded as a nuclear commercial model for the world, was as of 2011 locked in a national debate over a partial nuclear phase-out. In the same time, however, Sweden embraced a nuclear phase-out policy as early as 1980, so preceding all these countries; but only the two oldest reactors, of twelve, were shut down at their end of life; while in 2010 Swedish Parliament repealed this policy.

Eight German nuclear power reactors (Biblis A and B, Brunsbuettel, Isar 1, Kruemmel, Neckarwestheim 1, Philippsburg 1 and Unterweser) were permanently shut down on 6 August 2011, following the Japanese Fukushima nuclear disaster.

As said, the 2011 Japanese Fukushima nuclear disaster has led some European energy officials to re-think nuclear power generation, especially in Germany and Switzerland. Switzerland has abandoned plans to replace its old nuclear reactors and will take the last one offline in 2034. Anti-nuclear movement intensified in Germany. In the following months the government decided to shut down eight reactors immediately (6 August 2011) and to have the other nine off the grid by the end of 2022. Renewable energy in Germany is believed to be able to compensate for much of the loss. In September 2011 Siemens, which had been responsible for constructing all 17 of Germany's existing nuclear power plants, announced that it would exit the nuclear sector following the Fukushima disaster and the subsequent changes to German energy policy. Chief executive Peter Löscher has supported the German government's planned Energiewende, its transition to renewable energy technologies, calling it a "project of the century" and saying Berlin's target of reaching 35% renewable energy sources by 2020 was feasible. Despite this, the phasing out of nuclear energy seems to be much more difficult and costly than expected. The transition is tending more towards polluting fossil fuel plants than clean renewable energies, sparking several critics. Actually, transition plans did not meet their short-term goals and will hardly meet their medium-term goals; fossil fuel prices and technology are still more efficient, cheaper and easier to implement than heavily state-subsidised solar and wind power generation.

In 2023, France and group of member states founded the European Nuclear Energy Alliance, which contributed to advancing nuclear energy in EU policies, which was supported by the (Nuclear Energy Summit) in Brussels in March 2024 to strengthen its political comeback.

In February 2024, the European Commission launched the European Industrial Alliance on Small Modular Reactors (SMRs), aiming to accelerate deployment and support a new generation of nuclear technologies as part of the EU’s clean energy transition.

== See also ==
- Nuclear energy policy by country – Europe
- World Nuclear Industry Status Report
- European countries by fossil fuel use (% of total energy)
