= Energoland =

Information center for energy and electricity generation in Mochovce, Slovakia

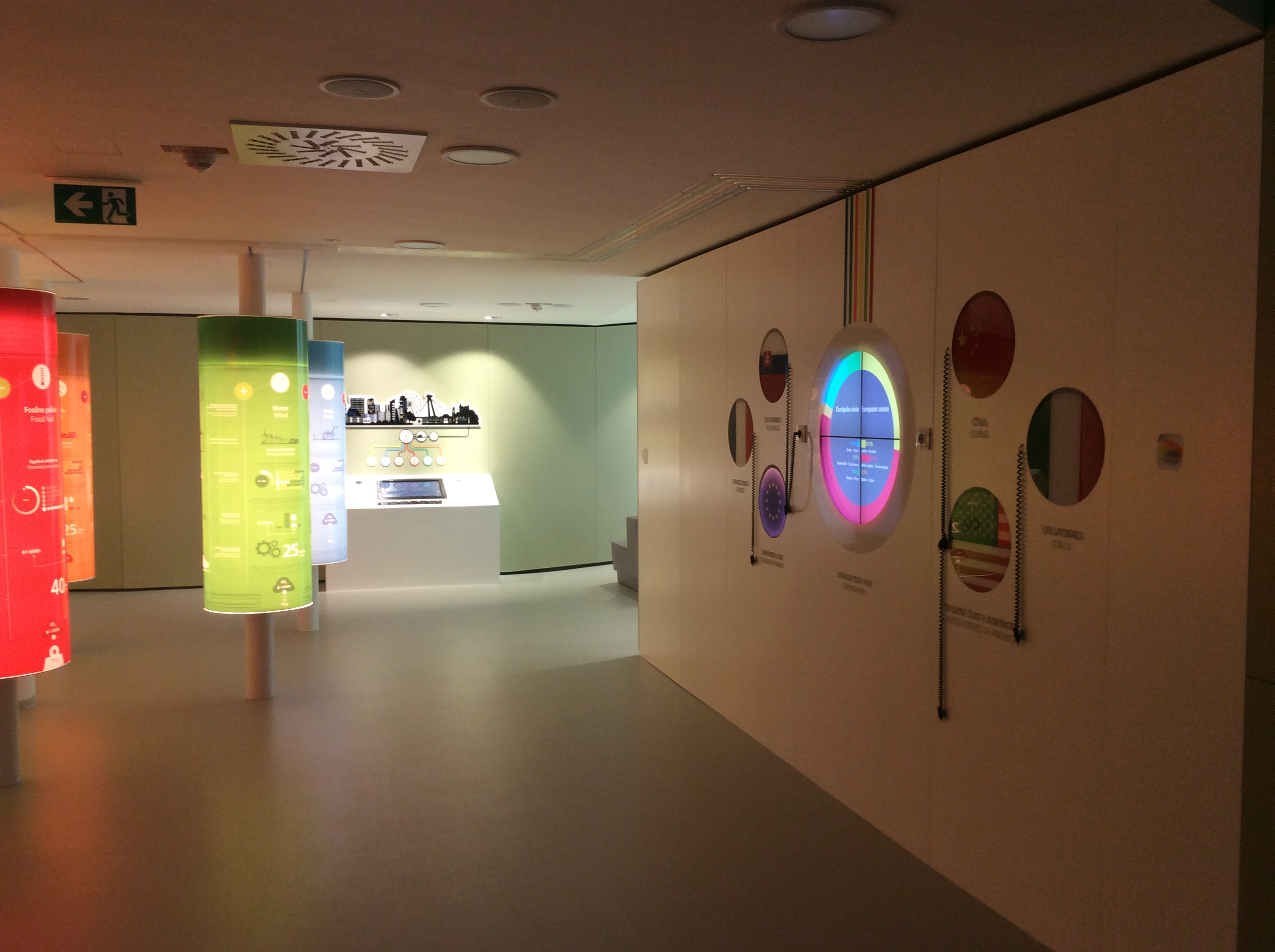

Energoland is an information center for energy and electricity generation which was opened by Slovenské elektrárne on 14 October 2014 at Mochovce, Slovakia, at the site of a nuclear power plant. It is situated between Levice and Nitra. The center mainly serves the schools and public. The entry is free of charge. The exposition was awarded as an excellent communication project at the PIME conference and evaluated as a five-star training center by Laura Elizabeth Kennedy, governor of the United States of America in the Board of Governors of the International Atomic Energy Agency in Vienna and chargé d'affaires of permanent representation of the USA in international organisation in Vienna.

== Exposition ==
Energoland offers more than thirty objects, applications, and interactive expositions. Edutainment (blending education and entertainment) at Mochovce offers information on energy, electricity generation, global warming, and carbon burden. Visitors learn about the energy mix, electricity grid dispatching, and about the radiation around us. The exposition also focuses on the power industry, both with respect to safety and radioactive waste and dealing with the fuel cycle, nanoworld of atoms, and Cherenkov radiation. Some of the specialities include the 3D cinema with its own movie Energy Odyssey, a model of emission-free motorcycles, interactive LED floors or thermal mirrors, and the augmented-reality mobile application Energoland. The Energy Map shows various statistics in a world map with countries highlighted.

Energoland also attempts to help visitors form their own opinions of electricity generation and sources, so in addition to nuclear energy, it provides information about other sources: water, sun, wind, geothermal energy, and fossil fuels.

== Construction of Energoland ==
The design of the building is the work of Ing. arch. Viktor Šabík (BARAK Architekti) who, together with the QEX Company and Italian agency Piter Design, designed the interior of Energoland, as well.[2] The total area of the building, including the training rooms and offices is 2,000 square metres; the info center itself takes up the area of 600 m2.

== Other activities ==
Energoland serves as a training center for the employees of Slovenské elektrárne and provides office areas, in addition to being a visitor and information center. There are many events for the employees of Slovenské elektrárne or public taking place here, such as the 90 reactor-years anniversary, programme within the national round of Olympics in Physics, Science Talks during the Science and Technology Week, Sustainable Development Conference in May 2015, etc.
