= KS 150 =

Gas-cooled nuclear reactor

KS 150 is a gas-cooled reactor using heavy water as a moderator (GCHWR) nuclear reactor design. A single example, A-1, was constructed at the Bohunice Nuclear Power Plant in Jaslovské Bohunice, Czechoslovakia. The power plant suffered a series of accidents, the worst being an accident on February 22, 1977, rated INES-4. Since 1979 the plant has been undergoing decommissioning.

== History ==
The decision to build a nuclear power plant in Czechoslovakia was made in 1956. Construction of A-1 in Jaslovské Bohunice (western Slovakia) started in 1958 and took an unexpected 16 years. A-1 was commissioned on October 24, 1972.

The KS 150 reactor was built entirely in Czechoslovakia, designed together with USSR, built by Škoda Works. One advantage of the design was its ability to use unenriched uranium mined in Czechoslovakia, similar to a CANDU reactor.

Because of its experimental design the power plant suffered from accidents resulting in over 30 unplanned shutdowns. On January 5, 1976, two workers were killed due to a leak of carbon dioxide, which was used as a coolant. A 'technical' (mechanical?) failure occurred during refuelling and a fresh fuel assembly was shot off the reactor into the reactor's hall. The most serious accident from 1977 (see below) was rated INES-4. The damage could have been repaired with a large investment but on May 17, 1979, the government, dissatisfied with high costs, low performance and accidents, decided to decommission the plant. Plans to build the second reactor block A-2 were canceled.

The accidents were kept secret, although wild stories circulated among the public.

A1 Nuclear Power Plant was in operation for 19,261 hours altogether, it generated 1,464 GWh and supplied 916 GWh to the network. Maximum output achieved was 127 MW.

Decommissioning, decontamination and dismantling of the plant still continues and is expected to be completed in 2033.

== Technical details ==
KS 150 is a heavy water moderated, gas cooled reactor (HWGCR) able to refuel during operation.

Seventy metal uranium wires, each clad in a compound of magnesium and beryllium, are bundled together to form a fuel rod.

The reactor's pressure vessel is of 15 cm carbon steel in a cylindrical shape with diameter 5.1 m and height 20 m. Within the pressure vessel (in the active zone) is a cylindrical vessel of aluminium- magnesium-silicon alloy for the heavy water moderator.

Fuel channels are vertical, each containing a single fuel rod cooled with circulating carbon dioxide. The core is in a pressurized vessel to allow refuelling during operation. The heavy water moderator is cooled in a separate circuit.

Carbon Dioxide gas used as a primary coolant is streamed around the fuel rods. After being heated by the rods it is piped to six steam generators. The resulting steam powers three turbogenerators.

- Fuel: unenriched metal uranium, 23.1 tonnes in the reactor.
- Core: diameter 3.56 m, height 4 m.
- Coolant gas on exit from reactor: pressure 5.4 MPa (~54 atm), temperature 426 °C.
- Conversion efficiency: 18.5%.
- Moderating heavy water: temperature 65 °C (Max/exit 90 °C)
- Capacity: 143 MWe.

== 1977 accident ==
On February 22, 1977, during a fuel change, a combination of human mistakes and design problems caused the worst nuclear accident in Czechoslovak history. Some fuel rods were being replaced while the reactor was active in a standard procedure. In this instance however humidity absorbers covering the rods were not removed, causing local overheating of the fuel (since transmission of heat to the coolant gas was reduced). The active zone was damaged, heavy water came into contact with the coolant and both primary and secondary circuits were contaminated.

The accident was rated as level 4 on International Nuclear Event Scale (in comparison, the Three Mile Island accident was rated level 5).

25% of the fuel elements in a heavy water moderated carbon dioxide cooled 100 MW(e) power reactor were damaged due to operator error. The operators failed to remove silica gel pellets that had fallen into a new fuel element from a damaged pack (there was no procedure available to check the interior of fuel element, therefore only pellets from the top were removed). The silica gel packs were used to keep the unused fuel dry during storage and transport. The silica gel pellets blocked the flow of the coolant resulting in overheating of the fuel and the pressure channel holding it. As a result of overheating the heavy water leaked into the part of the reactor (the gas circuit) where the fuel elements are accommodated, the fuel cladding was subject to corrosion and a considerable amount of radioactivity leaked into the primary cooling circuit (CO_{2} gas). Through leaks in the steam boilers (similar basic design to a MAGNOX or AGR plant) some parts of the secondary circuit became contaminated.
