= Slovenské elektrárne =

Slovenské elektrárne, a.s.
- Type: Joint-stock company
- Industry: Electric power industry
- Founded: 1994
- Headquarters: Bratislava, Slovakia
- Key people: Branislav Strýček (chairman and CEO)
- Products: Electricity and heat
- Services: Grid ancillary services
- Revenue: €3.914 billion (2025)
- Operating income: €1.379 billion (2025)
- Net income: €968.1 million (2025)
- Total assets: €14.652 billion (2025)
- Total equity: €6.421 billion (2025)
- Owner: EPH (66%); Slovak state (34%)
- Number of employees: 5,027 (2025)
- Website: www.seas.sk/en/

Slovenské elektrárne, a.s. is an electricity generating company based in Bratislava, Slovakia, and the country's largest electricity producer. It operates the Bohunice and Mochovce nuclear power plants, as well as hydroelectric and solar power plants. It also operates pumped-storage and battery storage facilities.

The Czech energy group EPH controls 66% of the company through Slovak Power Holding, while the Slovak state owns the remaining 34%. EPH acquired Enel's remaining interest in Slovak Power Holding in May 2025.

== Hydroelectric power ==
Slovenské elektrárne's 31 hydroelectric power plants had a total installed capacity of 1,653 MW in 2026. These included pumped-storage plants at Čierny Váh, Liptovská Mara, Ružín and Dobšiná, with a combined capacity of 916.4 MW.

The company's reservoir-based plants include Orava, Liptovská Mara, Nosice and Kráľová. Alongside electricity generation, its hydroelectric plants provide frequency regulation and reserve capacity for the electricity grid. Čierny Váh, with an installed capacity of 735 MW, is Slovakia's largest pumped-storage power plant.

== Energy storage ==
Slovenské elektrárne began operating a battery storage facility at its former Nováky coal plant in July 2026. With a power output of 36 MW and a storage capacity of 72 MWh, it was Slovakia's largest battery installation at the time of its opening. The facility helps keep the grid frequency stable. It also stores surplus electricity for use at times of peak demand. The company also operates a smaller, 3.2 MW battery system at the Dobšiná hydroelectric plant.

At Čierny Váh, the company's SE Integrátor project combines the modernisation of two pumped-storage units with a planned battery installation. The units are being converted to variable-speed operation to improve their flexibility. The EU awarded €62.63 million from its Connecting Europe Facility to the first phase of the project. Work on this phase is due to finish in 2031. In October 2026, Slovenské elektrárne announced plans for a battery system with a power output of up to 120 MW and a storage capacity of 480 MWh.

== Nuclear power ==
Slovenské elektrárne operates two reactors at the V2 station of the Bohunice Nuclear Power Plant and three at the Mochovce Nuclear Power Plant. All five are VVER-440 pressurised water reactors. Electricity supplied by the five reactors reached a record 17,930 GWh in 2025.

Mochovce's first two units entered operation in 1998 and 1999, followed by Unit 3 in commercial operation in October 2023. Unit 4, with an electrical capacity of 471 MW, first supplied electricity to the grid on 15 October 2026. This formed part of its commissioning programme, with further testing at increasing power levels required before full commercial operation.
