= Mochovce Nuclear Power Plant =

Nuclear power plant located in Slovakia

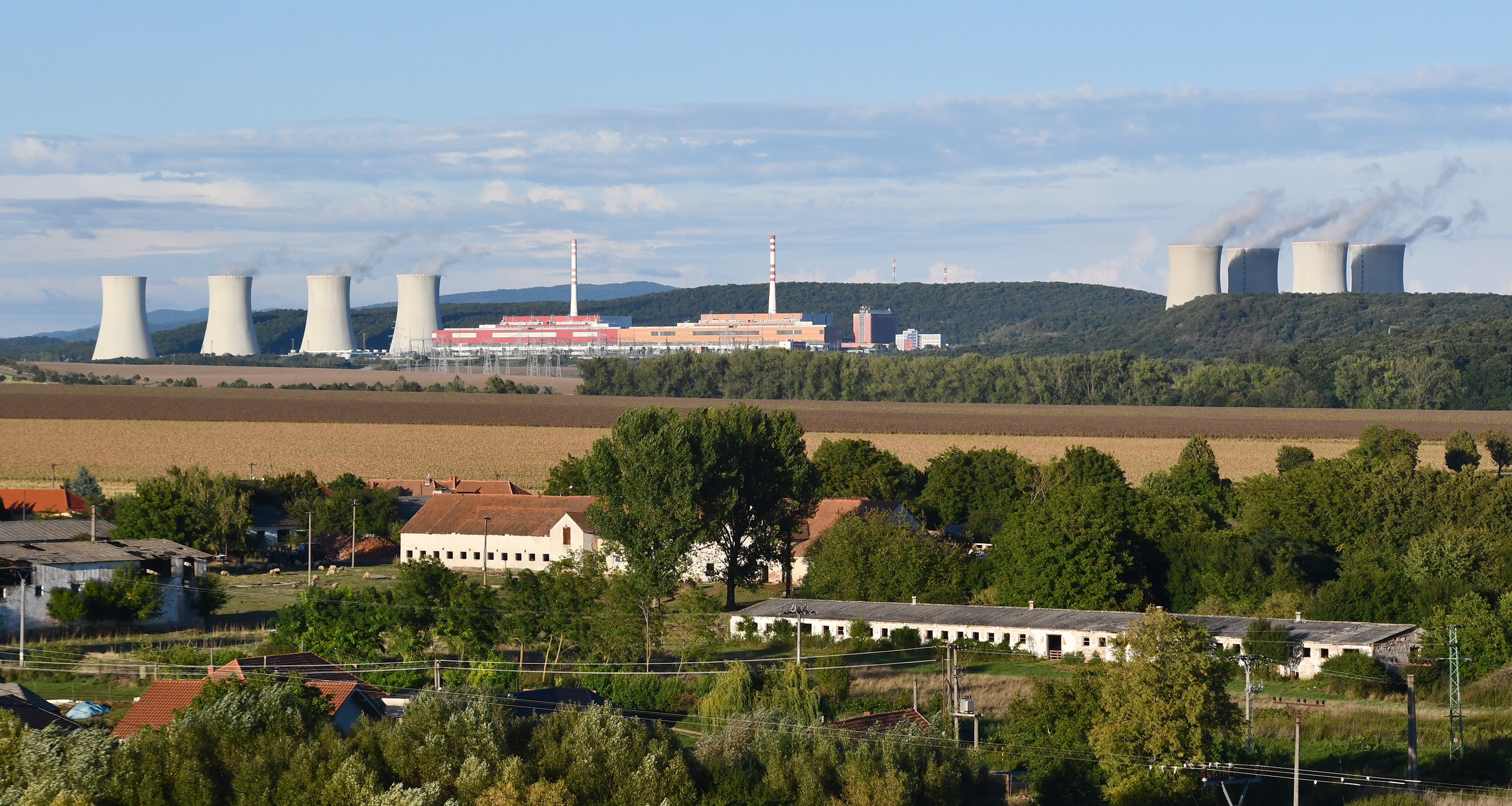
- Mochovce Nuclear Power Plant viewed from Čefáre in Slovakia
- Country: Slovakia
- Coordinates: 48°15′50″N 18°27′25″E
- Status: Operational
- Construction began: October 1, 1983
- Commission date: October 29, 1998
- Owner: Slovenské elektrárne a.s.
- Operator: Electrostation Mochovce

Power generation
- Units operational: 2 x 470 MW; 1 x 471 MW
- Units under const.: 1 x 471 MW
- Nameplate capacity: 1,411 MW
- Capacity factor: 84.1%
- Annual net output: 6,922 GW·h

External links
- Commons: Related media on Commons

The Mochovce Nuclear Power Plant (Slovak: Atómové elektrárne Mochovce, abbr. EMO) is a nuclear power plant located between the towns of Nitra and Levice, on the site of the former village of Mochovce, Slovakia. Two up-rated 470 MW (originally 440 MW) reactors plus a 471 MW VVER 440 reactor are presently in operation, with a fourth of the same type under commissioning. In 2022 it generated almost 7,000 GWh of electricity, the power plant provided approximately 20% of Slovakia's electricity needs.

== History ==
A power plant consisting of four VVER 440/V-213 pressurized water reactors was proposed in the 1970s. The Czechoslovak government began with a geological survey to find a suitable seismically stable site. After taking into account all factors the location of the village of Mochovce was chosen. Preparatory work was started in June 1981, and site construction for Mochovce-1 and Mochovce-2 started in November 1982.

Construction of the remaining two units, Mochovce-3 and Mochovce-4, began in 1985 but work on all four units was halted in 1991 due to a lack of funds. In 1995 the Slovak government approved a plan to finish the first pair with additional Western safety technology. The first two units were commissioned in 1998 and 1999 respectively. Commissioning of the plant has sparked protests in Austria, a neighboring country strongly opposed to the use of nuclear energy in general. Installed capacity of units 1 and 2 was up-rated by 7% in 2008.

Construction of Units 3 and 4 restarted in November 2008. They were planned initially to be completed in 2012 and 2013, but the completion date was shifted to 2020 and 2022. Unit 4 was connected to the grid on October 15, 2026.

The owner of the plant is Slovenské elektrárne, which is 34% state-owned. Enel, an Italian utility company, was the majority 66% owner, but sold half its stake to Czech energy group EPH in 2017. Enel plans to sell its remaining stake after completion of units 3&4.

== Units 1&2 operations ==
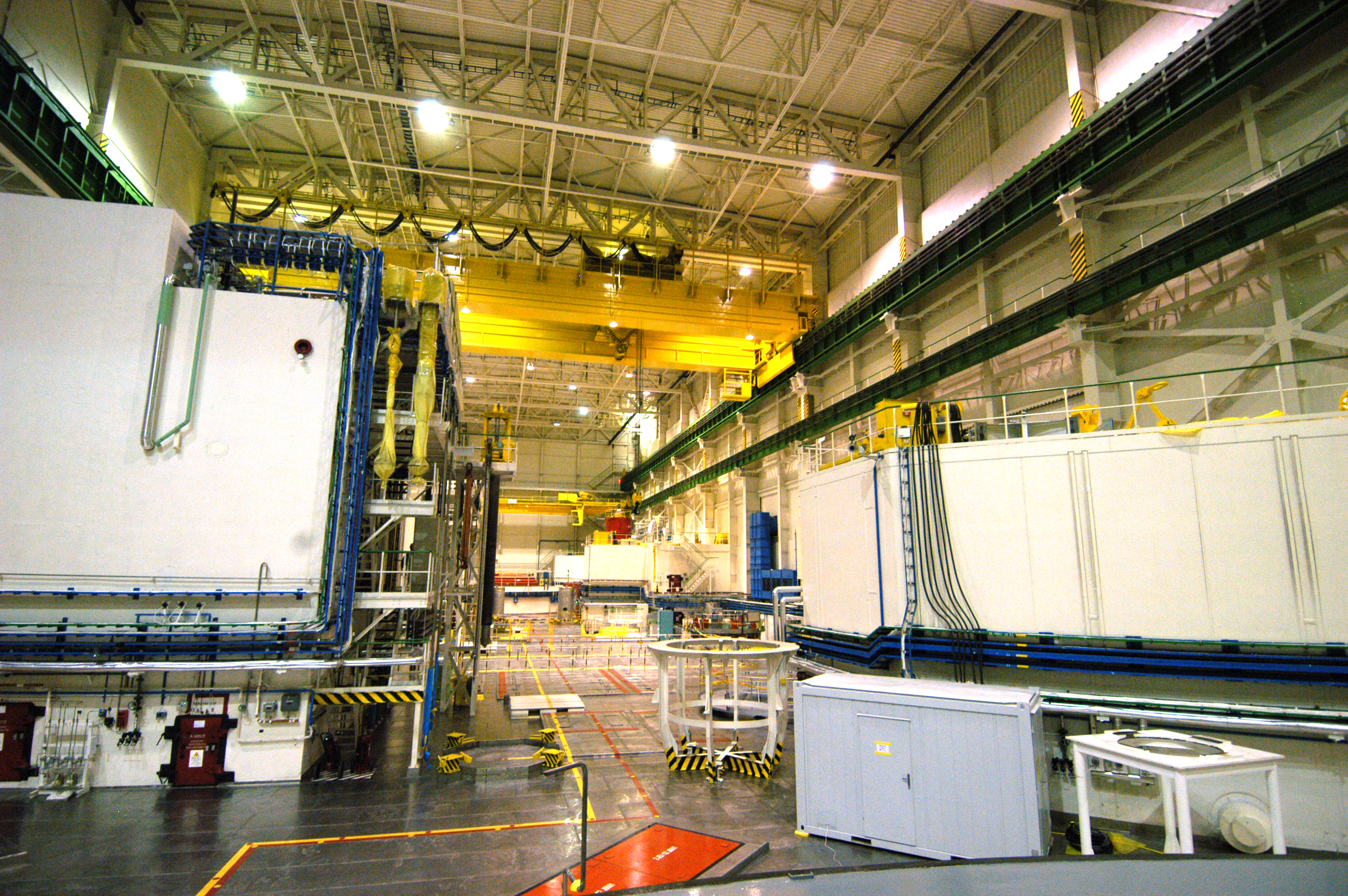
Reactor hall for units 1&2

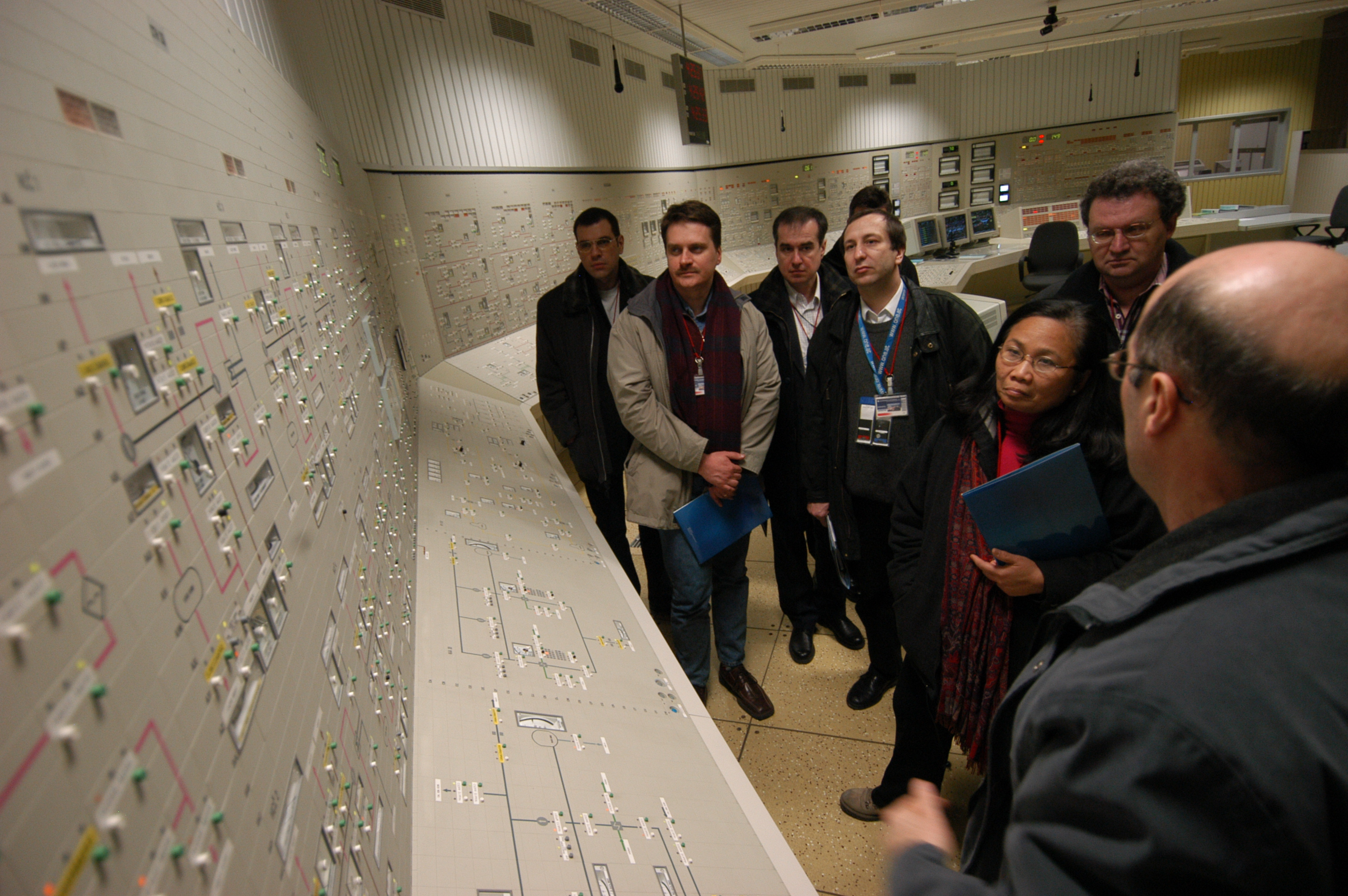
Control room for units 1&2

Since late 2008 the two operating units at Mochovce NPP have uprated net electrical power output to 436 MW per turbogenerator, ergo the total installed capacity of units 1 and 2 in Mochovce NPP stands at 872 MW. In 2009, the plant managed to generate over 7 TWh of electricity during a one-year period for the first time in its history. This represents approximately one quarter of the overall annual electricity consumption in Slovakia. All units at Bohunice and Mochovce NPP feature evolutionary VVER pressurized water reactors, which are characteristic with:

- relatively low power and power density
- huge volume of water for cooling during normal operation as well as in emergency
- robust design with reinforced concrete containment with walls thick up to 1.5 m
- triple redundancy safety systems (3 x 100%)
- high level of passive safety.

Water flowing from the units' VVER-440 reactors to primary circuit heat exchangers has a temperature of about 297 °C. Cooling is by cooling towers.

== Units 3&4 construction ==
Units 3&4 of Mochovce NPP are currently under construction. This project is:

- one of the three projects of nuclear power plants currently under construction in the EU
- the largest private investment in the history of Slovakia
- 2/3 of works on site are performed by Slovak companies
- 90% of the population around power plant is in favour of the completion of Units 3&4
- each unit will have 471 MWe gross 440 MWe net electrical output
- annual production of two units will save over 7 million tonnes of CO_{2} emissions.

Unit 3 was expected to be operational in 2021 and unit 4 in 2023, delayed from earlier plans for 2018 and 2019.

The commissioning license was issued for unit 3 in January 2022. The technical start license was issued in August 2022.

On the 26th of August 2022, the Slovak Nuclear Regulatory Authority (ÚJD) gives the final authorisation for the commissioning of Unit 3. The operator (Slovenské elektráne) commenced fuel loading operations on 9 September 2022. The first reactor criticality was reached on 22 October 2022. The third reactor was operational as of October 2023.

Unit 4 reached criticality on 6 August 2026, was connected to the grid, and started supplying its first electricity on 15 October 2026.

When all four units are operational, nuclear power is expected to produce 70% of Slovakia's electricity.

== Safety ==
Although the original power plant design featured safety improvements such as seismically resistant attachment of equipment, it did not suit the safety and regulatory environment of the 1990s. To rectify this the German company Siemens supplied a new control system, and Western and EU safety measures were implemented during the final phases of construction. According to the plant operator Mochovce nuclear power plant was the first Soviet-sourced nuclear plant in the former Eastern Bloc to meet the safety standards of Western nuclear power plants. The nuclear industry was conceived and developed with a conscientious awareness of having to face and respect strict safety guidelines, as well as technical, environmental and health standards. For this reason, safety at a power plant is verified and controlled at maximum possible levels in all of its phases (project design, authorization, construction, operation, decommissioning and final dismantlement), using procedures that have been elaborated exclusively for the needs of this specific sector. In addition, the realization of a nuclear power station is subordinated by a particularly complex authorization process comprising two different components: authorization from a nuclear safety standpoint, and in terms of its environmental impact (EIA – Environmental Impact Assessment). In concrete terms, safety in the electronuclear industry is entrusted to a set of technical, organizational and human measures enacted throughout all stages of an installation's lifetime, with the aim of protecting citizens and the surrounding environment from a release of radioactive material under any circumstances.

== Environment ==
Nuclear power plants emit no greenhouse gas to the atmosphere, in this way NPPs annually contribute to CO_{2} emission reduction by 15 million tonnes in Slovakia. Nuclear power plants hence contribute significantly to the obligation to reduce emissions of harmful greenhouse gas to the atmosphere. Mochovce NPP meets all international requirements and that the operation impact is minimal. Water required for cooling is taken from a water dam built on the nearby Hron river, which ensures sufficient supply of water even in extremely dry climate conditions. The impact of the discharged water on the quality of the Hron river water, fauna and flora is negligible. Emissions to the atmosphere and effluents to the hydrosphere are regularly measured and assessed in the 15-km area around the plant. There are 25 monitoring stations of the tele-dosimetry system, which continuously monitor the dose rate of gamma radiation, activity of aerosols and radioactive iodine in the air, soil, water and food chain (feed, milk, agricultural products). The volume of radioactive substances contained in liquid and gaseous discharges is considerably lower than the limits set out by authorities.

== Radiation protection ==
For radiation protection of the power plant staff and population, the ALARA principle is applied. This principle ensures that the radiation exposure inside and outside the power plant is As Low As Reasonably Achievable and well below the limits set by legislation. The impact of the NPP operation on the environment and human health is negligible with respect to other radiation sources present in everyday life. There are 24 monitoring stations of the tele-dosimetry system in the 20 km radius around the power plant, which continuously monitors the dose rate of gamma radiation, volume activity of aerosols and radioactive iodine in the air, soil, water and food chain (feed, milk, agricultural produces). The volume of radioactive substances contained in liquid and gaseous discharges is considerably lower than the limits set out by authorities.

== Stress tests ==
Immediately after the Fukushima accident, European politicians, representatives of the nuclear industry and regulatory bodies agreed on the undertaking of power-plant safety reviews. All 15 member states of the EU operating nuclear power plants were involved. The testing of the two Bohunice NPP V2 units and all four Mochovce NPP units was carried out mainly through engineering analyses, calculations and reports. Stress tests analysed extraordinary external events – earthquakes, floods, and impacts of other events that might result in the multiple loss of power-plant safety functions. The combination of events, including loss of power supply, long-term water supply breakdown, as well as loss of power supply due to extreme climate conditions were also assessed. Stress tests revealed no deficiencies requiring immediate action; the further safe operation of neither the operating units nor the units under construction was put in doubt. Identified measures would further increase nuclear safety, for example by adding mobile diesel-generator for recharging of back-up batteries.

== Technical data ==
Unit	Reactor type	Net capacity	Thermal power	Construction start	first criticality	Commercial operation	Exp. shutdown (start)	status
Mochovce 1	VVER 440/213	470 MW	1471 MW	1983-10-13	1998-06-09	1998-10-29	2058	operational
Mochovce 2	VVER 440/213	470 MW	1471 MW	1983-10-13	1999-12-01	2000-04-11	2060	operational
Mochovce 3	VVER 440/213	471 MW	1375 MW	1987-01-27	2022-10-22	2023-10-17		operational
Mochovce 4	VVER 440/213	471 MW	1375 MW	1987-01-27	2026-10-15			Construction complete, criticality achieved, undergoing testing

== See also ==
- Energoland
- Nuclear power in Slovakia
- List of commercial nuclear reactors#Slovakia
