= Mochovce =

Village in Slovakia

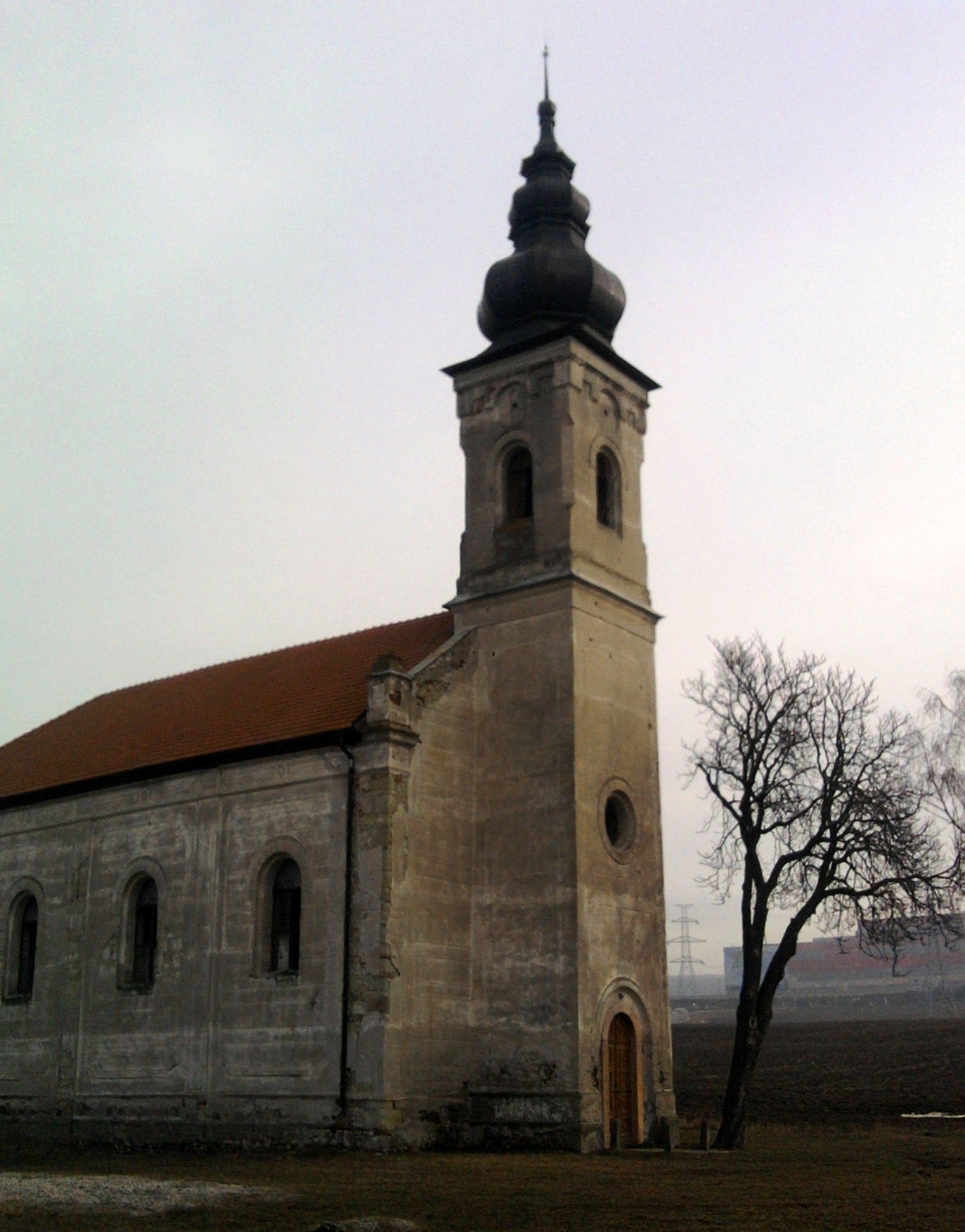
Church in Mochovce

Mochovce (Hungarian: Mohi) is a former village in western Slovakia, best known for its nuclear power plant.

It is situated in Nitra Region, 13 kilometres (8 mi) northwest of Levice. The village inhabitants were relocated and the village was destroyed to make place for the power plant. A late baroque church and a cemetery are the only remaining structures. In contrast, the power plant construction has brought an economic and demographic boom to the nearby town of Levice in the 1980s.
