= Jaslovské Bohunice =

- Municipality
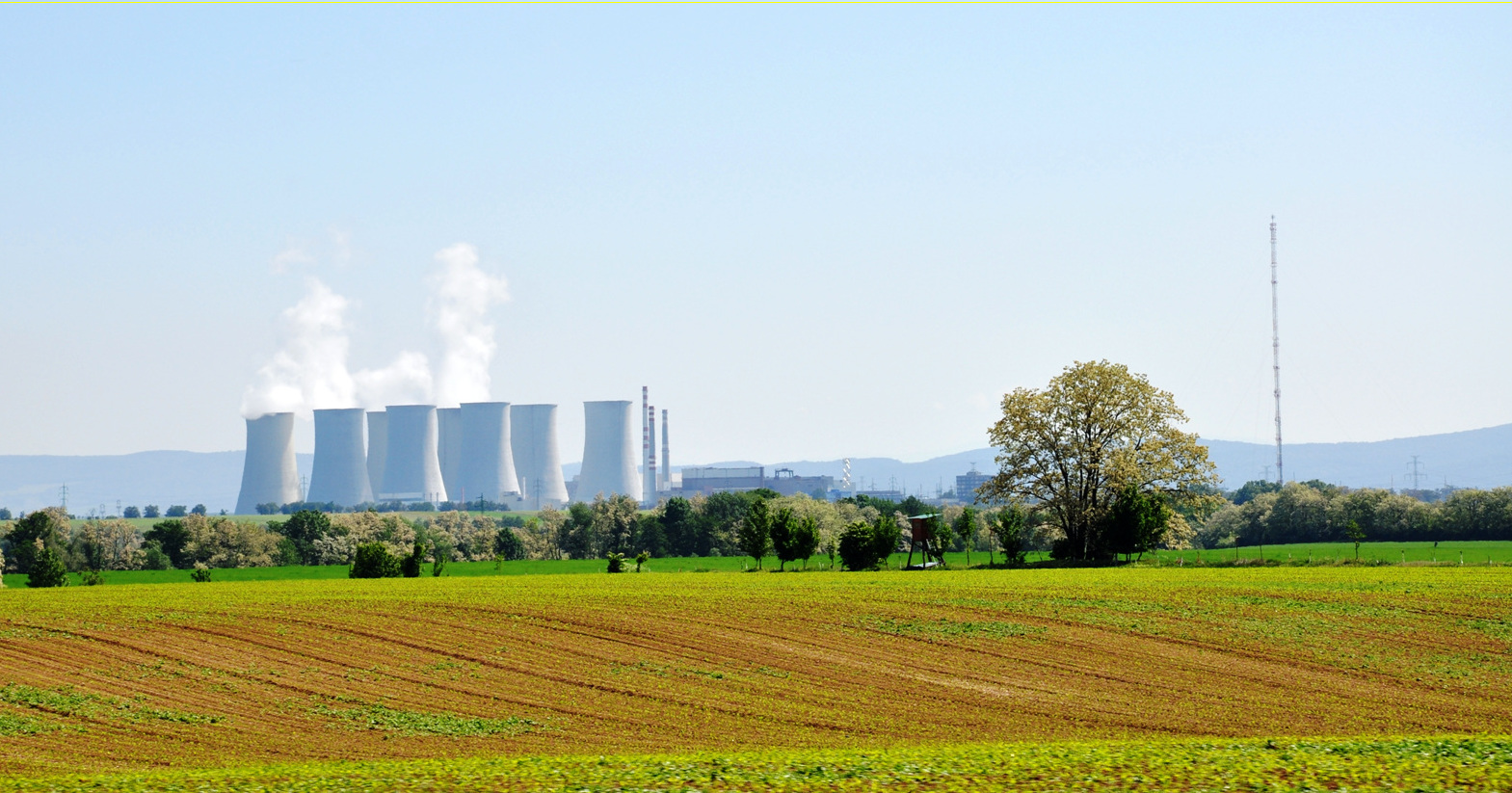

- Flag

- Location of Jaslovské Bohunice in the Trnava Region Location of Jaslovské Bohunice in Slovakia
- Coordinates: 48.48°N 17.65°E
- Country: Slovakia
- Region: Trnava Region
- District: Trnava District
- First mentioned: 1113

Area
  - Total: 20.08 km^{2} (7.75 sq mi)
- Elevation: 162 m (531 ft)

Population (2025)
  - Total: 2,458
- Time zone: UTC+1 (CET)
  - Summer (DST): UTC+2 (CEST)
- Postal code: 919 30
- Area code: +421 33
- Vehicle registration plate (until 2022): TT
- Website: www.jaslovske-bohunice.sk

Jaslovské Bohunice is a small village in Slovakia in the Trnava District. It is best known for the nearby Bohunice Nuclear Power Plant complex.

The village arose in 1958 through a merge of Jaslovce (pop. 578 in 1948) and Bohunice (pop. 619 in 1948). The former village of Paderovce was amalgamated in 1976. The first written reference dates back to 1113 (to Bohunice).

== Geography ==
The municipality lies at an altitude of 162 metres (531 ft) and covers an area of 20.08 km^{2} (7.75 sq mi) (2025).

== Climate ==
Climate data for Jaslovské Bohunice (1991-2020), elevation: 178m
Month	Jan	Feb	Mar	Apr	May	Jun	Jul	Aug	Sep	Oct	Nov	Dec	Year
Record high °C (°F)	15.6 (60.1)	19.5 (67.1)	22.4 (72.3)	30.7 (87.3)	32.4 (90.3)	36.2 (97.2)	38.4 (101.1)	38.7 (101.7)	33.1 (91.6)	27.8 (82.0)	21.0 (69.8)	16.0 (60.8)	38.7 (101.7)
Mean daily maximum °C (°F)	2.2 (36.0)	5.0 (41.0)	10.4 (50.7)	17.0 (62.6)	21.3 (70.3)	25.1 (77.2)	27.5 (81.5)	27.3 (81.1)	21.6 (70.9)	15.2 (59.4)	8.5 (47.3)	2.9 (37.2)	15.3 (59.6)
Daily mean °C (°F)	−0.7 (30.7)	1.1 (34.0)	5.2 (41.4)	10.9 (51.6)	15.3 (59.5)	18.9 (66.0)	20.9 (69.6)	20.6 (69.1)	15.5 (59.9)	10.2 (50.4)	5.3 (41.5)	0.5 (32.9)	10.3 (50.5)
Mean daily minimum °C (°F)	−3.5 (25.7)	−2.4 (27.7)	0.8 (33.4)	5.0 (41.0)	9.3 (48.7)	12.6 (54.7)	14.4 (57.9)	14.5 (58.1)	10.6 (51.1)	6.2 (43.2)	2.4 (36.3)	−2.0 (28.4)	5.7 (42.2)
Record low °C (°F)	−20.1 (−4.2)	−18.4 (−1.1)	−13.5 (7.7)	−5.8 (21.6)	−1.6 (29.1)	4.0 (39.2)	5.5 (41.9)	6.0 (42.8)	0.5 (32.9)	−7.5 (18.5)	−12.6 (9.3)	−20.7 (−5.3)	−20.7 (−5.3)
Average precipitation mm (inches)	35.2 (1.39)	30.8 (1.21)	33.8 (1.33)	33.9 (1.33)	58.4 (2.30)	59.3 (2.33)	64.7 (2.55)	60.0 (2.36)	60.4 (2.38)	47.0 (1.85)	43.8 (1.72)	41.5 (1.63)	568.8 (22.38)
Average precipitation days (≥ 0.1 mm)	12.8	10.9	11.4	9.1	12.6	11.4	10.7	10	10.2	11.3	13.3	14.2	137.9
Average snowy days	9.7	7.2	4.4	1.1	0	0	0	0	0	0.2	3.6	7.3	33.5
Average relative humidity (%)	83.9	78.8	71.5	63.7	67.3	67.8	64.6	66.9	72.2	79	83.8	86	73.8
Mean monthly sunshine hours	65.9	97.4	149.3	213.5	247.1	259.1	266.2	259.4	184.5	129.1	66.5	52.4	1,990.4
Source: NOAA NCEI

Climate data for Jaslovské Bohunice (1991-2020 precipitation days)
Month	Jan	Feb	Mar	Apr	May	Jun	Jul	Aug	Sep	Oct	Nov	Dec	Year
Average precipitation days (≥ 1.0 mm)	7.2	6.6	6.6	5.7	8.5	7.5	7.7	6.7	7.1	7.2	7.8	8	86.6
Source: NOAA

== Population ==
Population statistic (10 years)
Year	1995	2005	2015	2025
Count	1649	1877	2170	2458
Difference		+13.82%	+15.61%	+13.27%

Population statistic
Year	2024	2025
Count	2433	2458
Difference		+1.02%

It has a population of 2458 people (31 December 2025).

=== Ethnicity ===
Census 2021 (1+ %)
Ethnicity	Number	Fraction
Slovak	2271	97.17%
Not found out	41	1.75%
Total	2337	

In year 2021 was 2337 people by ethnicity 2271 as Slovak, 41 as Not found out, 18 as Romani, 15 as Czech, 6 as Rusyn, 6 as Russian, 6 as Other, 3 as Ukrainian, 3 as Italian, 3 as Hungarian, 1 as Jewish, 1 as Serbian, 1 as Moravian and 1 as Korean.

Note on population: The difference values of population numbers in the table "Population statistic" and in the sections "Ethnicity" & "Religion" is caused by the use of various statistical methods.

=== Religion ===
Census 2021 (1+ %)
Religion	Number	Fraction
Roman Catholic Church	1820	77.88%
None	395	16.9%
Not found out	53	2.27%
Total	2337	

In year 2021 was 2337 people by religion 1820 from Roman Catholic Church, 395 from None, 53 from Not found out, 13 from Greek Catholic Church, 11 from Evangelical Church, 10 from Other, 9 from Ad hoc movements, 8 from Christian Congregations in Slovakia, 6 from Other and not ascertained christian church, 4 from Eastern Orthodox Church, 3 from Jewish community, 2 from Jehovah's Witnesses, 2 from Hinduism and 1 from Calvinist Church.

== See also ==
- List of municipalities and towns in Slovakia

== Genealogical resources ==
The records for genealogical research are available at the state archive "Statny Archiv in Bratislava, Slovakia"

- Roman Catholic church records (births/marriages/deaths): 1768-1896 (parish A)
- Lutheran church records (births/marriages/deaths): 1717-1895 (parish A)
