= Bohunice Nuclear Power Plant =

Power plant in Slovakia

Jaslovské Bohunice Nuclear Power Plant
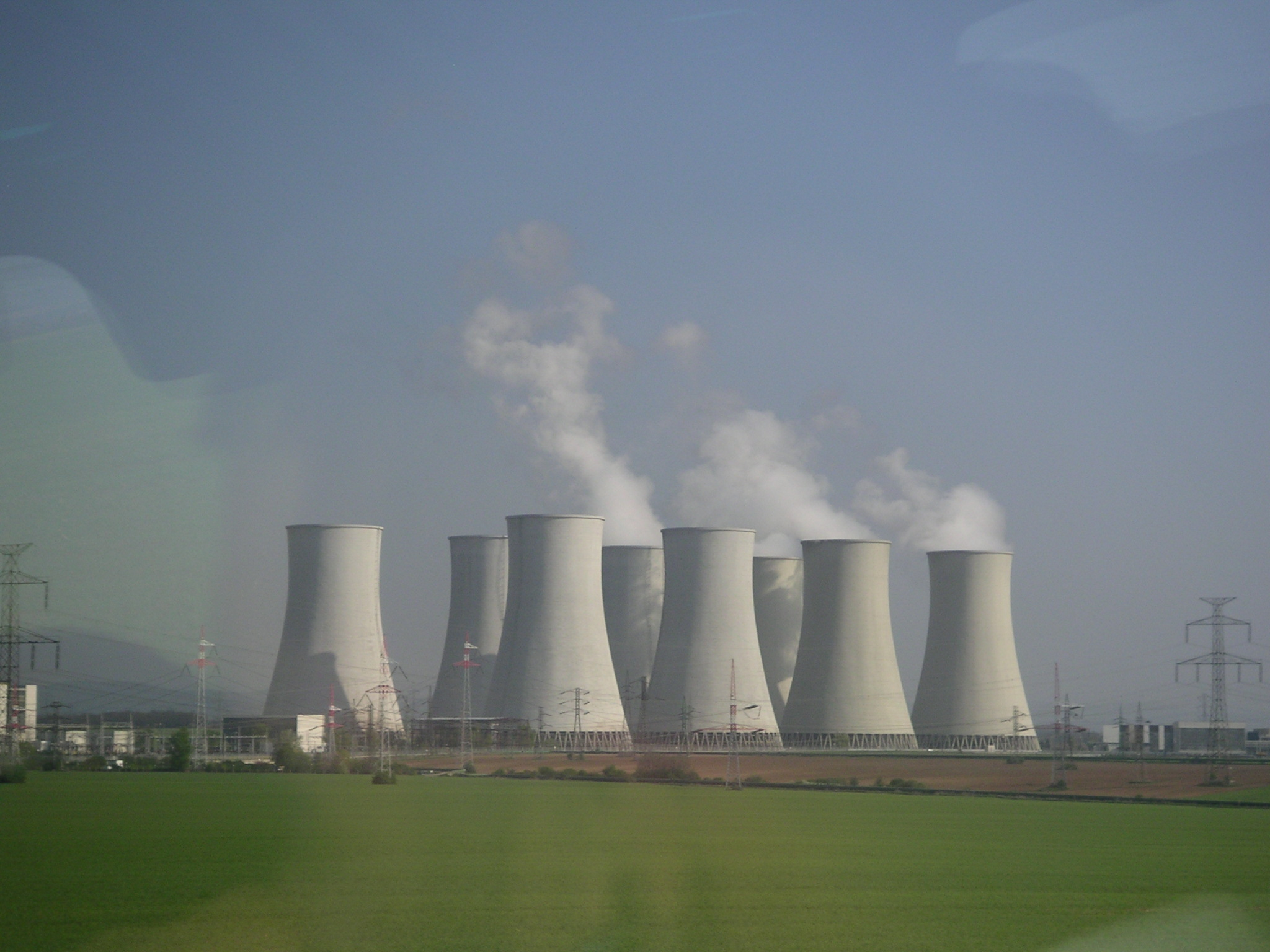
- Country: Slovakia
- Coordinates: 48°29′40″N 17°40′55″E
- Status: Operational
- Construction began: 1 August 1958
- Commission date: 25 December 1972
- Decommission date: 2006, 2008
- Owners: Slovenské elektrárne a.s., a.s. (V2), Javys, a.s. (A1 and V1)
- Operator: Electrostation Bohunice

Power generation
- Units operational: 2 x 471 MW
- Units decommissioned: 2 x 408 MW, 1 x 93 MW
- Nameplate capacity: 942 MW
- Capacity factor: 87.9%
- Annual net output: 7,779 GW·h

External links
- Commons: Related media on Commons

The Jaslovské Bohunice Nuclear Power Plant (NPP) (Slovak: Atómové elektrárne Jaslovské Bohunice, abbr. EBO) is a complex of nuclear reactors situated 2.5 km from the village of Jaslovské Bohunice in the Trnava District of western Slovakia.

Bohunice NPP consists of three plants: A1 (shut down—one KS 150 reactor unit), V1 (shut down—two VVER units), and V2 (two VVER units). The plant was connected to the national power network in stages between 1972 and 1985. The two power reactors presently in operation, as well as the decommissioned units at V1, are pressurized water reactors of the Soviet VVER-440 design.

Annual electricity generation averages about 12,000 GWh. Upon development of a district heating supply network in the town of Trnava near Bohunice NPP, V2 switched to co-generation. Part of this system is a heat feeder line commissioned in 1987. In 1997, a heat feeder line to Leopoldov and Hlohovec was created, branching off from the Trnava line.

== Reactor data ==
The Bohunice Nuclear Power Plant hosts two active VVER-440 reactors, while two older VVER-440s and a KS 150 reactor have been decommissioned. The Slovak government plans to build a new AP1000 unit on the site, which is to begin operation between 2038 and 2040.

	Reactor type	Power (thermal)	Power (electric)	Construction started	Commenced operations	Closure	Status	
A1	1x KS 150	770 MW	143 MWe	1958	1972	1977	Undergoing decommissioning	Involved in the 1976 accident
V1	2x VVER-440/230	2,750 MW	880 MWe	1972	1978	2008	Undergoing decommissioning	First VVER plant in Czechoslovakia
V2	2x VVER-440/213	2,750 MW	942 MWe	1976	1984	In service	Operational	Currently the only operational unit
New nuclear source	1x AP1000	3415 MW	1110 MWe	–	2038–2040		Planned	Planned

== Bohunice A1 (decommissioned) ==
The A1 plant was the first to be built on the site and the only one to ever host a KS 150 reactor. Designed and built in Czechoslovakia between 1958 and 1972, the KS 150 used non-enriched uranium as fuel. Unlike conventional reactors, refuelling was carried out while the reactor was in operation. From the beginning, there were various problems with its operation, and a number of accidents occurred, related to the reactor's experimental design. In 1976, the first major accident at the plant took place. During a fuel change, the carbon dioxide used to cool the reactor began leaking, resulting in the death of two workers and the scramming of the reactor. A second major accident, which received a fourth-degree rating by INES, occurred during refuelling in February 1977. A decision was subsequently made to shut down the reactor, due to the high cost of repairs following the accident as well as inefficiency of operation. The Czechoslovak government decided to build additional conventional Soviet reactors of the VVER type instead, which have a higher power output, with a more efficient operational process. The A1 power plant was closed and began a decommissioning and cleanup process.

== Bohunice V1 (decommissioned) ==
As a condition of accession into the European Union in 2004, Slovakia was required to deactivate the two reactors at the V1 plant. A provision in the accession treaty allowed for reactivation in case of an emergency.

The V1 plant was exempted from the sale of Slovenské Elektrárne to Enel and transferred to the Slovak Nuclear and Decommissioning Company, which was fully owned by the state. The first reactor was shut down at the end of 2006 and the second on the last day of 2008.

The Russia-Ukraine gas dispute in January 2009 disrupted natural gas supplies and electricity generation. On 10 January, the Slovak government ordered the second reactor, then still undergoing a shutdown procedure, to be returned to power-generation-capable mode. The reactor was ultimately not reconnected to the grid, and the shutdown resumed.

== Bohunice V2 (operating) ==
Bohunice V2 consists of two second-generation VVER-440/213 units that went online on 20 August 1984 and 18 December 1985, respectively. In November 2010, both reactors were uprated from 440 MW to 471 MW (gross electrical output), and operation is planned to be maintained until 2055.

== Planned reactor ==
The idea of building a new unit at the Bohunice plant was first proposed during prime minister Robert Fico's first term, in 2006. By 2026, the American company Westinghouse's AP1000 was chosen as the preferred design, in favour of other competing reactors such as the South Korean APR-1400 and the French EPR. Construction is slated to begin in 2032.

== Gallery ==
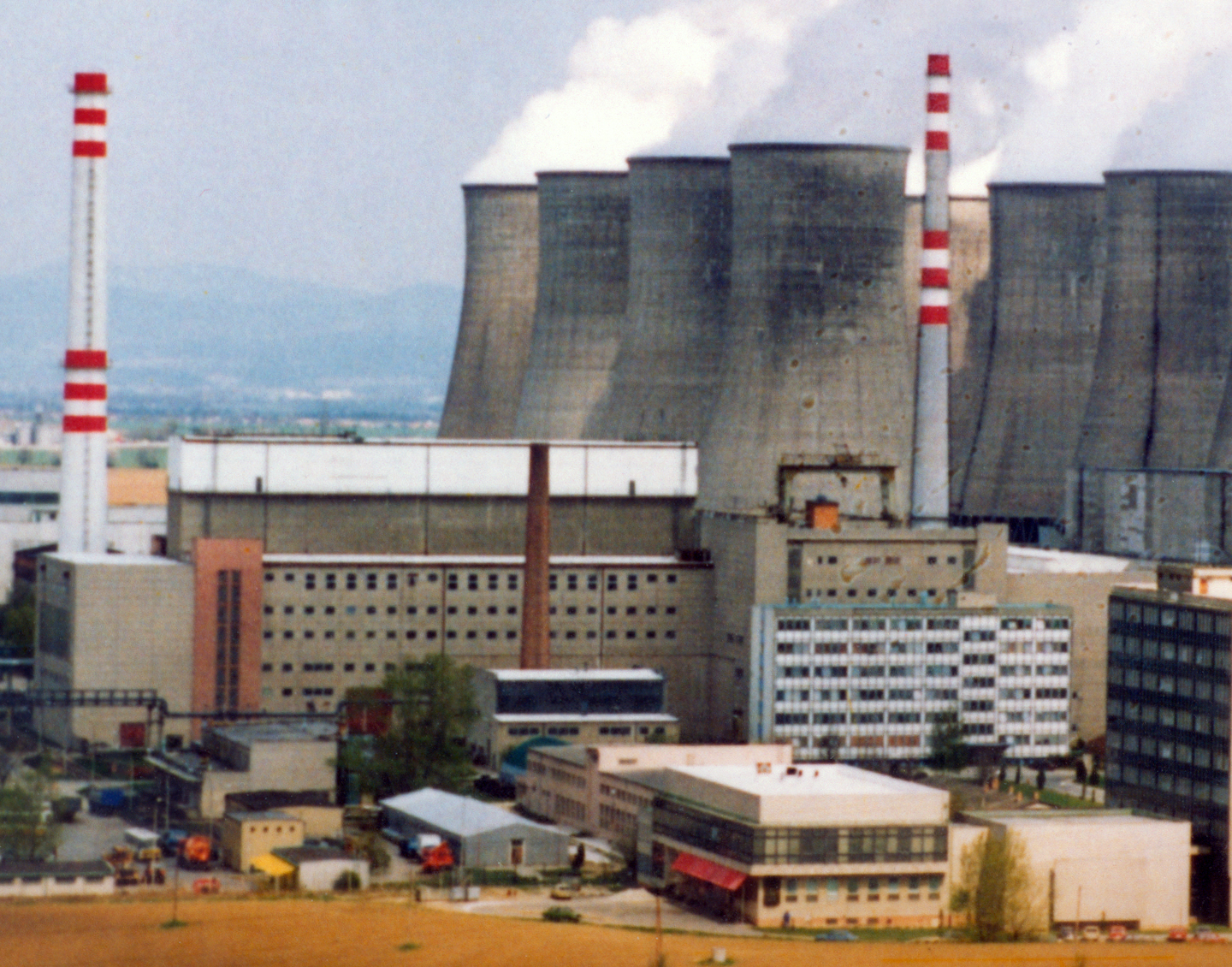
Aerial view of the cooling towers and reactor buildings

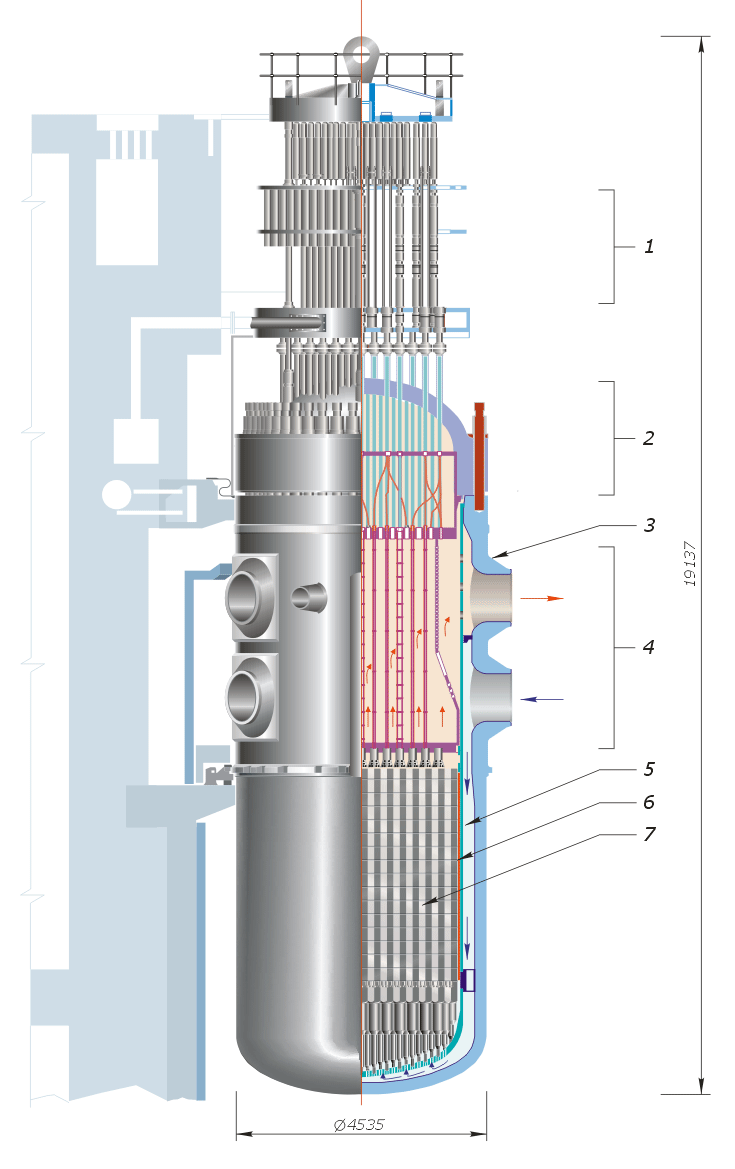
Scheme of a VVER-1000 reactor, similar to the ones currently in operation at the plant

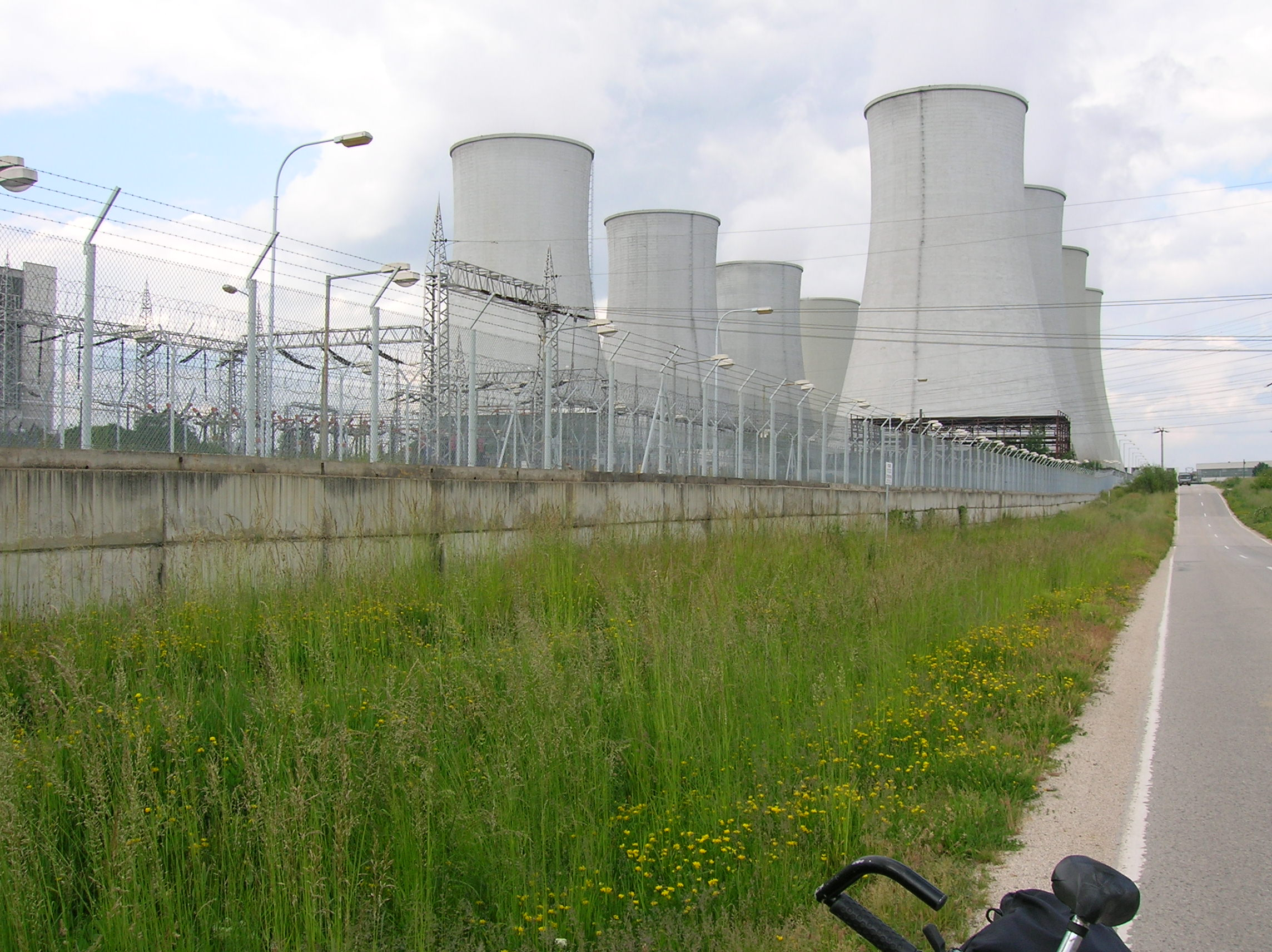
Roadside view of the plant
