= List of tallest structures in Slovakia =

This is the list of the tallest structures in Slovakia. This list contains every type of structure.

Name	Pinnacle height	Year	Structural type	Town	Coordinates	Remarks
Dubnik Transmitter	318 m (1,043 ft)	1961	Guyed mast	Zlatá Baňa	48°55′25.29″N 21°27′44.65″E	
Suchá Hora transmitter	312 m (1,024 ft)	1960	Guyed mast	Kremnica	48°44′18.01″N 18°59′47.22″E	
Chimney of Novaky Power Plant	300 m (980 ft)	1976	Chimney	Nováky	48°41′55.83″N 18°32′0.47″E	
Chimney of DUSLO Factory	240.4 m (789 ft)	1992	Chimney	Šaľa	48°10′56.35″N 17°56′15.5″E	
Laskomer transmitter	221 m (725 ft)	1936	Guyed mast	Banská Bystrica	48°45′19.52″N 19°07′09.45″E	insulated against ground
Petrovany transmitter	220 m (720 ft)	1980s	Guyed mast	Petrovany	48°56′55.24″N 21°16′3.92″E	insulated against ground, demolished 26 October 2011
Jaslovské Bohunice Meteorological Tower	212.5 m (697 ft)	1984	Guyed mast	Jaslovské Bohunice	48°29′11.7″N 17°39′47.6″E	
Chimney of Mondi Business Paper SCP	204 m (669 ft)	1981	Chimney	Ružomberok	49°4′45.4″N 19°19′57.4″E	
Chimney of ZSNP	202 m (663 ft)	1985	Chimney	Žiar nad Hronom	48°34′3.16″N 18°51′31.66″E	
Chimney of Považská Bystrica Old Power Station	201 m (659 ft)	1987	Chimney	Považská Bystrica	49°06′58.93″N 18°25′24.19″E	dismantled in 2016
Chimney of Strážske Chemko Power Station	200 m (660 ft)	?	Chimney	Strážske	48°52′25.4″N 21°48′51.8″E	
Chimney of Vojany Power Station, EVO 1	200 m (660 ft)	1966	Chimney	Vojany	48°33′8.66″N 21°58′19.85″E	
Large Chimney of Krompachy Kovohuty Copper Smelter	200 m (660 ft)	?	Chimney	Krompachy	48°55′20.65″N 20°52′52.36″E	
Chimney of Power Station of Vranov nad Topľou Bukóza Holding Works	197 m (646 ft)	?	Chimney	Vranov nad Topľou	48°51′31.71″N 21°44′7.85″E	
Kamzik TV Tower	194 m (636 ft)	1975	Tower	Bratislava	48°10′57.15″N 17°5′40.88″E	
Large Chimney of Žilina Heat Power Station	192 m (630 ft)	1982	Chimney	Žilina	49°13′13.25″N 18°45′45.28″E	
Chimney of Zvolen Heat Power Station	190 m (620 ft)	?	Chimney	Zvolen	48°33′58.55″N 19°10′15.05″E	
Chimney of Vojany Power Station, EVO 2	175 m (574 ft)	1974	Chimney	Vojany	48°33′12.96″N 21°58′41.43″E	Height until 1998, 300 metres
Rimavská Sobota Shortwave Transmitter, Towers of Antenna North	171 m (561 ft)	1950s	Lattice tower	Rimavská Sobota	48°24′19.82″N 20°07′28.8″E ; 48°24′24.66″N 20°07′25.42″E ; 48°24′29.9″N 20°07′26.27″E ; 48°24′32.39″N 20°07′28.73″E	
Rimavská Sobota Shortwave Transmitter, Towers of Antenna Southeast	170 m (560 ft)	?	Lattice tower	Rimavská Sobota	48°24′17.55″N 20°07′48.21″E ; 48°24′17.26″N 20°07′43.73″E	
Považská Bystrica Chimney	170 m (560 ft)	?	Chimney	Považská Bystrica	49°07′03.35″N 18°25′05.19″E	
Martin Chimney	164 m (538 ft)	?	Chimney	Martin	49°03′31.65″N 18°54′26.68″E	
Štúrovo Chimney	161 m (528 ft)	?	Chimney	Štúrovo	47°46′52.57″N 18°41′30.36″E	
Snina Chimney	160 m (520 ft)	?	Chimney	Snina	48°59′13.61″N 22°10′27.61″E	
Chimney of Devínska Nová Ves	160 m (520 ft)	?	Chimney	Devínska Nová Ves	48°12′52″N 16°59′15″E	
Chimney of Petrochema	160 m (520 ft)	?	Chimney	Dubová	48°48′41.32″N 19°26′22.29″E	
Chimney of Bánovce nad Bebravou	151 m (495 ft)	?	Chimney	Bánovce nad Bebravou	48°43′34.51″N 18°16′42.63″E	
Chimney of Volkswagen	150 m (490 ft)	?	Chimney	Bratislava	48°13′52.4″N 16°59′14.2″E	
Chimney of Jaslovské Bohunice Power Station	150 m (490 ft)	?	Chimney	Jaslovské Bohunice	48°29′37.02″N 17°40′37.44″E	
Chimney of Novaky Power Plant-B, Units 1 + 2	150 m (490 ft)	1963	Chimney	Nováky	48°41′39.63″N 18°31′57.46″E	
Chimney of Mochovce Nuclear Power Station	150 m (490 ft)	?	Chimney	Mochovce	48°15′34.14″N 18°27′30.53″E	
Chimney of Mochovce Nuclear Power Station	150 m (490 ft)	?	Chimney	Mochovce	48°15′43.68″N 18°27′29.29″E	
Jarok transmitter	142 m (466 ft)	1988	Guyed mast	Jarok	48°16′38.19″N 17°54′43.74″E	
Myjava Chimney	140 m (460 ft)	?	Chimney	Myjava	48°46′14.6″N 17°34′11.7″E	
Partizánske Chimney	140 m (460 ft)	?	Chimney	Partizánske	48°37′54.97″N 18°22′10.18″E	
Veľké Kostoľany Radio Mast	140 m (460 ft)	?	Guyed Mast	Veľké Kostoľany	48°31′13″N 17°43′34.2″E	
Kráľova Hoľa TV Mast	137.5 m (451 ft)	1960	Guyed Mast	Kráľova hoľa	48°52′58.16″N 20°08′23.32″E	
Trebišov Chimney	137 m (449 ft)	?	Chimney	Trebišov	48°38′44.42″N 21°43′06.7″E	
Čižatice transmitter	135 m (443 ft)	?	Guyed mast	Čižatice	48°47′55.38″N 21°24′0.24″E ; 48°47′54.88″N 21°24′3.09″E	2 masts, used for broadcasting on 1521 kHz
Veľká Javorina TV Tower	133 m (436 ft)	?	Tower	Veľká Javorina	48°51′26.56″N 17°40′30.45″E	
Nitra transmitter	133 m (436 ft)	?	Guyed mast	Nitra	48°17′16.98″N 17°59′25.02″E	
Trenčín Chimney	132 m (433 ft)	?	Chimney	Trenčín	48°52′15.16″N 18°03′43.81″E	
Chimney of Nováky Power Station	131 m (430 ft)	?	Chimney	Nováky	48°42′09″N 18°31′50″E	
Chimney of Vojany Power Station	131 m (430 ft)	?	Chimney	Vojany	48°33′08.2″N 21°58′21.58″E	
Nová Baňa Chimney	130 m (430 ft)	?	Chimney	Nová Baňa	48°24′35.23″N 18°38′41.27″E	
Chimney of Hnúšťa	130 m (430 ft)	?	Chimney	Hnúšťa	48°34′1.72″N 19°57′32.07″E	
Chimney of Humenné	130 m (430 ft)	?	Chimney	Humenné	48°55′35.46″N 21°53′43.53″E	
Žiar nad Hronom Chimney	130 m (430 ft)	?	Chimney	Žiar nad Hronom	48°34′04″N 18°51′34″E	
Rohožník Chimney	128 m (420 ft)	?	Chimney	Rohožník	48°27′23.95″N 17°11′35.2″E	
Chimney of Jaslovské Bohunice Power Station	126 m (413 ft)	?	Chimney	Jaslovské Bohunice	48°29′47.51″N 17°41′33.98″E	
Chimney of Jaslovské Bohunice Power Station	126 m (413 ft)	?	Chimney	Jaslovské Bohunice	48°29′40.78″N 17°40′23.3″E	
Mochovce Nuclear Power Station Cooling Tower	125 m (410 ft)	?	Tower	Mochovce	48°15′10.95″N 18°27′21.03″E ; 48°15′11.21″N 18°27′28.09″E ; 48°15′6.16″N 18°27′21.84″E ; 48°15′6.5″N 18°27′28.94″E	
Polomka Chimney	125 m (410 ft)	?	Chimney	Polomka	48°51′05″N 19°52′02.34″E	
Šaľa Chimney	124 m (407 ft)	?	Chimney	Šaľa	48°10′54.32″N 17°56′18.49″E	
Chimney of Zvolenská tepláreň	122 m (400 ft)	?	Chimney	Zvolen	48°10′30.47″N 17°3′26.2″E	
Nad Oborou Radio Tower	122 m (400 ft)	?	Lattice Tower	Horné Srnie	48°59′30.35″N 18°01′52.45″E	
Trnava Chimney	122 m (400 ft)	?	Chimney	Trnava	48°21′39.73″N 17°34′06.35″E	
Trnava Chimney	122 m (400 ft)	?	Chimney	Trnava	48°23′0.72″N 17°34′46.93″E	
Bratislava Waste Incinerator Chimney	121 m (397 ft)	?	Chimney	Bratislava	48°06′27.11″N 17°9′58.54″E	
Chimney of Bánovce nad Bebravou	120 m (390 ft)	?	Chimney	Bánovce nad Bebravou	48°43′48.22″N 18°14′39.38″E	
Ružomberok Chimney	120 m (390 ft)	?	Chimney	Ružomberok	49°05′05.43″N 19°16′36.11″E	
Ružomberok Chimney	120 m (390 ft)	?	Chimney	Ružomberok	49°04′47.21″N 19°19′44.29″E	
Slovnaft Chimney	120 m (390 ft)	?	Chimney	Bratislava	48°07′24″N 17°10′24″E	
Slovnaft Chimney	120 m (390 ft)	?	Chimney	Bratislava	48°06′41.01″N 17°11′2.67″E	
Chimney of Brezno	120 m (390 ft)	?	Chimney	Brezno	48°48′1.19″N 19°37′13″E	
Chimney of Dunajská Streda	120 m (390 ft)	?	Chimney	Dunajská Streda	47°59′36.33″N 17°35′48.74″E	
Slovnaft Steel Chimney	120 m (390 ft)	?	Chimney	Bratislava	48°06′26.82″N 17°11′38.52″E	
Chimney of Jelšava	120 m (390 ft)	?	Chimney	Jelšava	48°38′52.92″N 20°13′17.54″E	
Nižná Slaná Chimney	120 m (390 ft)	?	Chimney	Nižná Slaná	48°44′11.35″N 20°25′01.19″E	
Piesok Chimney	120 m (390 ft)	?	Chimney	Podbrezová	48°48′38.06″N 19°33′40.7″E	
Poprad Chimney	120 m (390 ft)	?	Chimney	Poprad	49°03′42″N 20°19′20″E	
Žilina	120 m (390 ft)	?	Chimney	Žilina	49°13′11.36″N 18°45′43.52″E	
Chimney of Heating station	120 m (390 ft)	1972	Chimney	Bratislava	48°08′38.78″N 17°07′29.51″E	
Chimney of Heating station	120 m (390 ft)	?	Chimney	Bratislava	48°07′10.71″N 17°05′30.55″E	
Levice Chimney	120 m (390 ft)	?	Chimney	Levice	48°11′49.66″N 18°35′56.13″E	
Liptovský Mikuláš Chimney	120 m (390 ft)	?	Chimney	Liptovský Mikuláš	49°04′32.8″N 19°38′06.92″E	
Tlmače Chimney	120 m (390 ft)	?	Chimney	Tlmače	48°17′21.21″N 18°32′58.34″E	
Vranov nad Topľou Chimney	120 m (390 ft)	?	Chimney	Vranov nad Topľou	48°51′50.67″N 21°44′20.24″E	
Zvolen Chimney	120 m (390 ft)	?	Chimney	Zvolen	48°34′05.13″N 19°09′54.12″E	
Strážske Cooling Tower	118 m (387 ft)	?	Cooling Tower	Strážske	48°52′35.86″N 21°49′3.53″E	
Krížava TV Mast	116 m (381 ft)	?	Guyed Mast	Martin	49°05′44.99″N 18°49′9.25″E	
Ťahanovce Chimney	115 m (377 ft)	?	Chimney	Košice	48°44′59.18″N 21°15′41.73″E	
Krásna Chimney	115 m (377 ft)	?	Chimney	Košice	48°39′27.81″N 21°18′44.82″E	
Chimney of Handlová	115 m (377 ft)	?	Chimney	Handlová	48°43′29.28″N 18°45′6.98″E	
Tower 115	115 m (377 ft)	1984	Skyscraper	Bratislava	48°8′28.7″N 17°7′40.67″E	
National Bank of Slovakia	112 m (367 ft)	2002	Skyscraper	Bratislava	48°9′10.4″N 17°6′54.1″E	
Spišská Nová Ves Chimney	112 m (367 ft)	?	Chimney	Spišská Nová Ves	48°56′03.02″N 20°35′55.32″E	
Tornaľa Chimney	112 m (367 ft)	?	Chimney	Tornaľa	48°24′40.19″N 20°19′29.39″E	
VSH Slovakia Silo	112 m (367 ft)	?	Silo	Turňa nad Bodvou	48°35′35.37″N 20°50′32.68″E	
Chimney of Bošany	110 m (360 ft)	?	Chimney	Bošany	48°34′32.37″N 18°14′11.04″E	
Chimney of Hriňová	110 m (360 ft)	?	Chimney	Hriňová	48°34′54.31″N 19°31′40.49″E	
Chimney of Dobšiná Power Station	110 m (360 ft)	?	Chimney	Dobšiná	48°47′31.87″N 20°21′30.07″E	
Nové Zámky Chimney	110 m (360 ft)	?	Chimney	Nové Zámky	47°59′0.37″N 18°11′20.42″E	
Nové Zámky Chimney	110 m (360 ft)	?	Chimney	Nové Zámky	47°58′54″N 18°10′49″E	
Prešov Chimney	110 m (360 ft)	?	Chimney	Prešov	48°59′05.87″N 21°15′10.32″E	
Prešov Chimney	110 m (360 ft)	?	Chimney	Prešov	48°59′59″N 21°13′46″E	
Trenčín Chimney	110 m (360 ft)	?	Chimney	Trenčín	48°53′39.88″N 18°03′38.38″E	
Trnava Chimney	110 m (360 ft)	?	Chimney	Trnava	48°22′11″N 17°37′20″E	
Turany Chimney	110 m (360 ft)	?	Chimney	Turany	49°06′15.14″N 19°02′04.41″E	
Veľká Ida Gasometer	110 m (360 ft)	?	Gasometer	Veľká Ida	48°36′4.85″N 21°10′54.64″E	
Veľká Ida Steel Work Chimney	110 m (360 ft)	?	Chimney	Veľká Ida	48°36′38.53″N 21°11′55.12″E	
Veľká Ida Steel Work Chimney	110 m (360 ft)	?	Chimney	Veľká Ida	48°36′58″N 21°11′46″E	
Vrútky Chimney	110 m (360 ft)	?	Chimney	Vrútky	49°06′38.98″N 18°56′35.43″E	
Zlaté Moravce Chimney	110 m (360 ft)	?	Chimney	Zlaté Moravce	48°23′55.69″N 18°23′49.77″E	
Slovak Television (building)	108 m (354 ft)	1975	Skyscraper	Bratislava	48°9′23″N 17°4′25″E	
City Business Center I	107 m (351 ft)	2007	Skyscraper	Bratislava	48°8′58.67″N 17°7′33.49″E	
Large Chimney of Detva Power Station	106 m (348 ft)	?	Chimney	Detva	48°33′41.39″N 19°21′57.46″E	
Chimney of Dolný Kubín	105 m (344 ft)	?	Chimney	Dolný Kubín	49°12′39.82″N 19°16′45.23″E	
Pezinok Chimney	105 m (344 ft)	?	Chimney	Pezinok	48°16′27.76″N 17°16′0.3″E	
Prešov Chimney	105 m (344 ft)	?	Chimney	Prešov	48°59′51″N 21°15′29″E	
Chimney of Gemer Brewery	105 m (344 ft)	?	Chimney	Rimavská Sobota	48°23′16.55″N 20°00′11.54″E	
Šurany Chimney	105 m (344 ft)	?	Chimney	Šurany	48°04′56.81″N 18°10′57.24″E	
VSH Slovakia Chimney	105 m (344 ft)	?	Chimney	Turňa nad Bodvou	48°35′37.85″N 20°50′35″E	
Žiar nad Hronom Chimney	105 m (344 ft)	?	Chimney	Žiar nad Hronom	48°33′39.99″N 18°50′32.62″E	
Nižná na Orave Chimney	104 m (341 ft)	?	Chimney	Nižná na Orave	49°18′43.84″N 19°32′11.78″E	
Senica Chimney	104 m (341 ft)	?	Chimney	Senica	48°40′57.37″N 17°21′36.42″E	
Magurica Radio Tower	104 m (341 ft)	?	Lattice tower	Snina	48°59′29.53″N 22°11′44.83″E	Hexagonal cross section
Chimney of Hermanec	103 m (338 ft)	?	Chimney	Hermanec	48°47′39.54″N 19°04′55.36″E	
Chimney of Heating station	103 m (338 ft)	?	Chimney	Bratislava	48°10′36.2″N 17°09′17.89″E	
Spišská Nová Ves Chimney	102 m (335 ft)	?	Chimney	Spišská Nová Ves	48°56′9.53″N 20°34′44.57″E	
Veľká Ida Steel Work Chimney	102 m (335 ft)	?	Chimney	Veľká Ida	48°36′39.86″N 21°11′40.25″E	
Žarnovica Chimney	102 m (335 ft)	?	Chimney	Žarnovica	48°29′23.68″N 18°43′38.27″E	
Kysucké Nové Mesto Chimney	101 m (331 ft)	?	Chimney	Kysucké Nové Mesto	49°18′32.48″N 18°47′07.36″E	
Veľká Ida Steel Work Chimney	101 m (331 ft)	?	Chimney	Veľká Ida	48°36′37.19″N 21°11′35.04″E	
Polyfunkčný dom Glória	100 m (330 ft)	2006	Skyscraper	Bratislava	48°09′17.79″N 17°8′21.07″E	
Millennium Tower II	100 m (330 ft)	2006	Skyscraper	Bratislava	48°10′3.3″N 17°8′20.5″E	
Rozbehy Wind Turbines	100 m (330 ft)	?	Wind turbine	Rozbehy	48°34′10.18″N 17°22′55.52″E ; 48°34′11.99″N 17°23′2.43″E ; 48°34′13.86″N 17°23′9.27″E ; 48°34′15.67″N 17°23′16.1″E	
Towers of Záhorie Testing Range	100 m (330 ft)	?	Lattice tower	Jablonica	48°37′10.11″N 17°20′35.18″E ; 48°37′12.43″N 17°20′31.54″E	used for calibration and spotting modern weapon systems
Leopoldov Prison Chimney	100 m (330 ft)	?	Chimney	Leopoldov	48°26′44.1″N 17°46′37.18″E	
Chimney of Nováky Power Station	100 m (330 ft)	?	Chimney	Nováky	48°42′30.94″N 18°31′53.79″E	
Pohronský Ruskov Chimney	100 m (330 ft)	?	Chimney	Pohronský Ruskov	47°58′29.93″N 18°39′24.24″E	
Sereď Chimney	100 m (330 ft)	?	Chimney	Sereď	48°16′05.5″N 17°44′30.49″E	
Strážske Chimney	100 m (330 ft)	?	Chimney	Strážske	48°52′28.39″N 21°48′39.89″E	
Topoľčany Chimney	100 m (330 ft)	?	Chimney	Topoľčany	48°33′54.96″N 18°10′32.62″E	
Vojany Power Station Cooling Tower	100 m (330 ft)	?	Chimney	Vojany	48°33′9.34″N 21°58′43.77″E; 48°33′10.47″N 21°58′49.18″E ; 48°33′11.82″N 21°58′54.7″E	
Žiar nad Hronom Chimney	100 m (330 ft)	?	Chimney	Žiar nad Hronom	48°33′47.2″N 18°50′58.79″E	
Žiar nad Hronom Chimney	100 m (330 ft)	?	Chimney	Žiar nad Hronom	48°33′40.34″N 18°50′45.31″E	
Chimney of TEKO Power Station	100 m (330 ft)	?	Chimney	Žiar nad Hronom	48°41′49.85″N 21°16′18.94″E : 48°41′53.08″N 21°16′18.27″E	
