= Jovsa =

Village and municipality in Slovakia

Jovsa Jósza
- Municipality
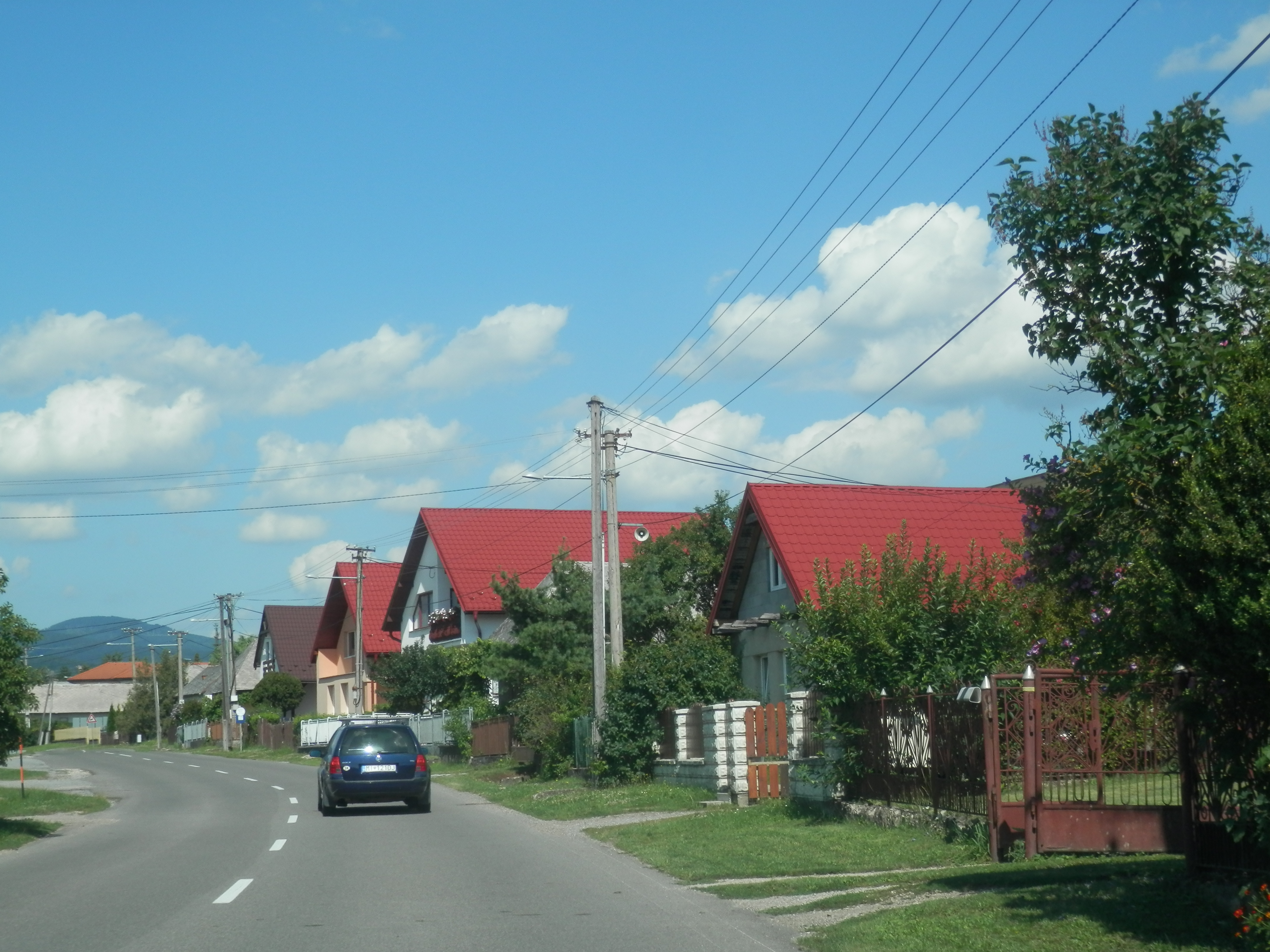

- Flag

- Location of Jovsa in the Košice Region Location of Jovsa in Slovakia
- Coordinates: 48.83°N 22.10°E
- Country: Slovakia
- Region: Košice Region
- District: Michalovce District
- First mentioned: 1418

Area
  - Total: 18.46 km^{2} (7.13 sq mi)
- Elevation: 134 m (440 ft)

Population (2025)
  - Total: 850
- Time zone: UTC+1 (CET)
  - Summer (DST): UTC+2 (CEST)
- Postal code: 723 2
- Area code: +421 56
- Vehicle registration plate (until 2022): MI
- Website: www.obecjovsa.sk

Jovsa (Hungarian: Jósza) is a village and municipality in Michalovce District in the Kosice Region of eastern Slovakia.

== History ==
In historical records the village was first mentioned in 1418. Before the establishment of independent Czechoslovakia in 1918, it was part of Ung County within the Kingdom of Hungary.

== Geography ==
The municipality lies at an altitude of 134 metres (440 ft) and covers an area of 18.46 km^{2} (7.13 sq mi) (2025).

== Population ==
Population statistic (10 years)
Year	1995	2005	2015	2025
Count	825	824	796	850
Difference		−0.12%	−3.39%	+6.78%

Population statistic
Year	2024	2025
Count	858	850
Difference		−0.93%

It has a population of 850 people (31 December 2025).

=== Ethnicity ===
Census 2021 (1+ %)
Ethnicity	Number	Fraction
Slovak	789	94.15%
Not found out	40	4.77%
Romani	35	4.17%
Total	838	

In year 2021 was 838 people by ethnicity 789 as Slovak, 40 as Not found out, 35 as Romani, 8 as Hungarian, 4 as Ukrainian, 3 as Rusyn, 1 as Jewish, 1 as Czech and 1 as Bulgarian.

Note on population: The difference values of population numbers in the table "Population statistic" and in the sections "Ethnicity" & "Religion" is caused by the use of various statistical methods.

=== Religion ===
Census 2021 (1+ %)
Religion	Number	Fraction
Greek Catholic Church	511	60.98%
Roman Catholic Church	138	16.47%
Not found out	77	9.19%
None	68	8.11%
Eastern Orthodox Church	14	1.67%
Total	838	

In year 2021 was 838 people by religion 511 from Greek Catholic Church, 138 from Roman Catholic Church, 77 from Not found out, 68 from None, 14 from Eastern Orthodox Church, 6 from Other and not ascertained christian church, 5 from Calvinist Church, 4 from Christian Congregations in Slovakia, 4 from Ad hoc movements, 3 from Jehovah's Witnesses, 3 from Evangelical Church, 2 from Other, 1 from Jewish community, 1 from Buddhism and 1 from Apostolic Church.

== Culture ==
The village has a small public library, a post office, a football pitch and a food store.

== Genealogical resources ==
The records for genealogical research are available at the state archive "Statny Archiv in Presov, Slovakia":

- Greek Catholic church records (births/marriages/deaths): 1767-1914 (parish A)

== Gallery ==
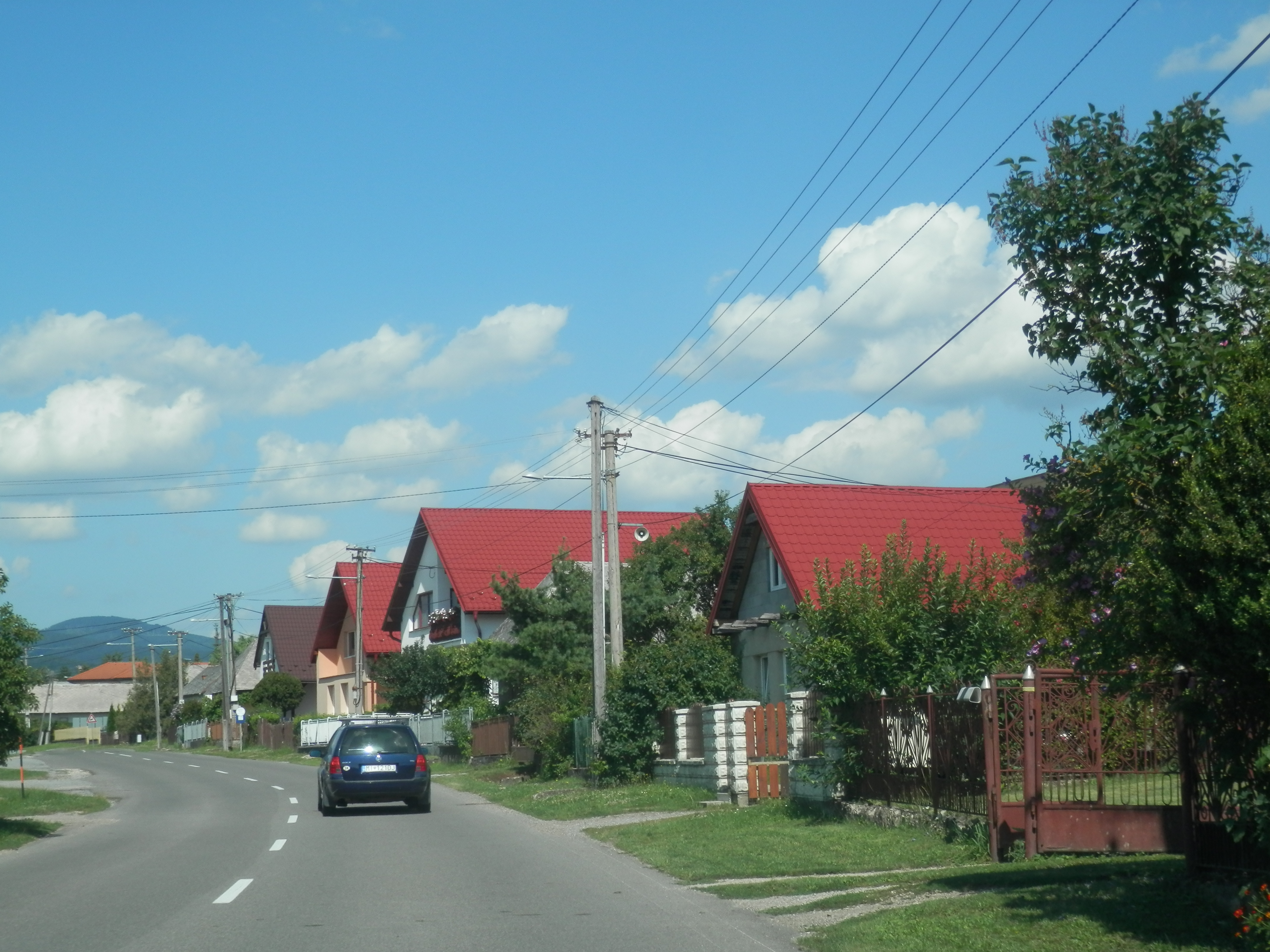
Main street in Jovsa

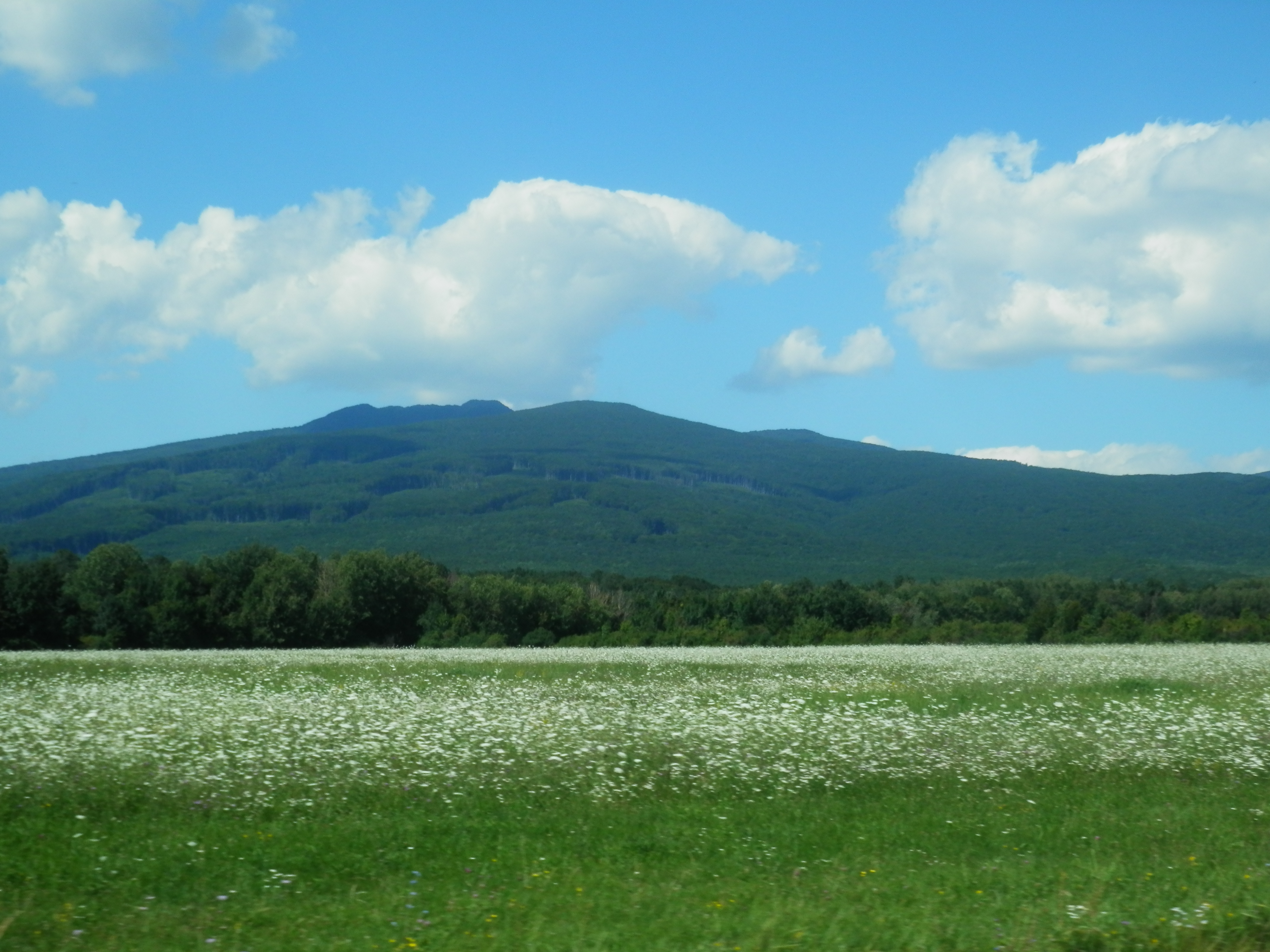
The Vihorlat Mountains seen from Jovsa

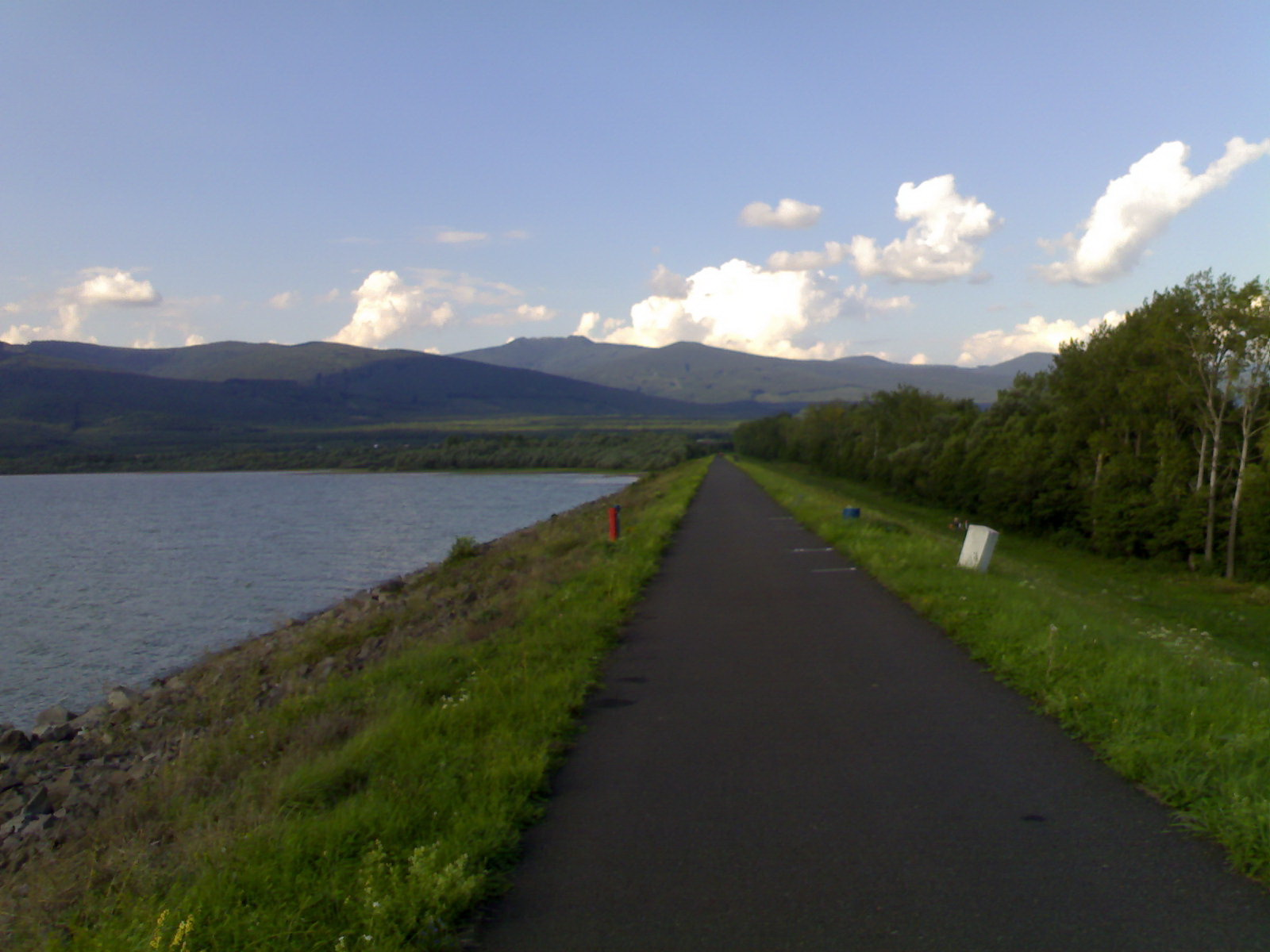
Dyke of the Zemplínska Šírava reservoir on the outskirts of Jovsa, with footpath

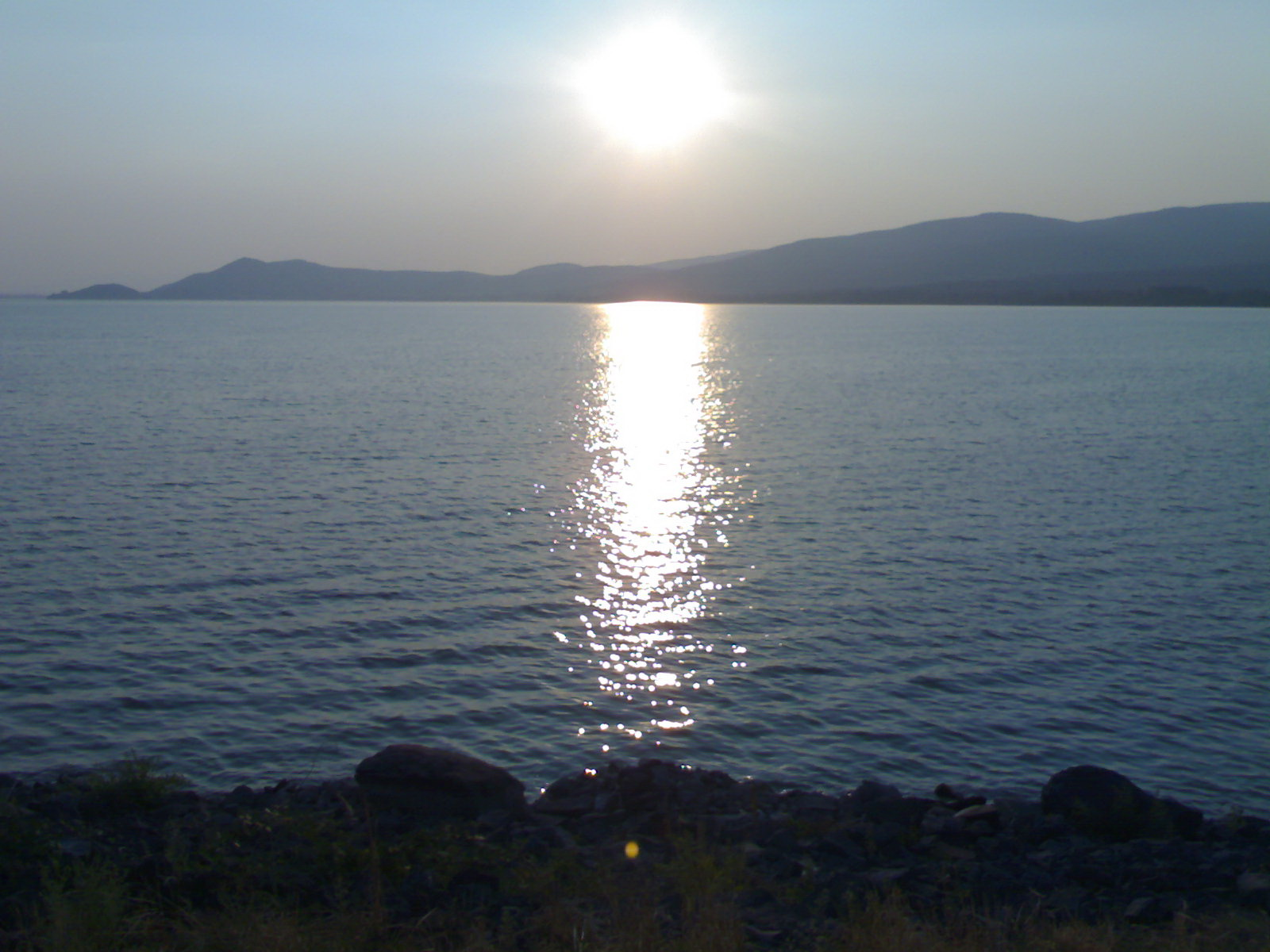
The Zemplínska Šírava reservoir from the shore in Jovsa, Medvedia hora peninsula seen in distance

== See also ==
- List of municipalities and towns in Slovakia

== Population ==
Population statistic (10 years)
Year	1995	2005	2015	2025
Count	825	824	796	850
Difference		−0.12%	−3.39%	+6.78%

Population statistic
Year	2024	2025
Count	858	850
Difference		−0.93%
