= Zalužice =

Village and municipality in Slovakia

Zalužice Zalacska
- Municipality
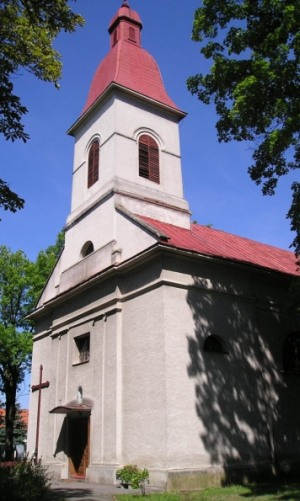

- Flag Coat of arms

- Location of Zalužice in the Košice Region Location of Zalužice in Slovakia
- Coordinates: 48.76°N 21.99°E
- Country: Slovakia
- Region: Košice Region
- District: Michalovce District
- First mentioned: 1249

Area
  - Total: 19.61 km^{2} (7.57 sq mi)
- Elevation: 124 m (407 ft)

Population (2025)
  - Total: 1,161
- Time zone: UTC+1 (CET)
  - Summer (DST): UTC+2 (CEST)
- Postal code: 723 4
- Area code: +421 56
- Vehicle registration plate (until 2022): MI
- Website: www.zaluzice.sk

Zalužice (Hungarian: Zalacska) is a village and municipality in Michalovce District in the Kosice Region of eastern Slovakia.

== History ==
In historical records the village was first mentioned in 1249.

== Geography ==
The municipality lies at an altitude of 124 metres (407 ft) and covers an area of 19.61 km^{2} (7.57 sq mi) (2025).

== Population ==
Population statistic (10 years)
Year	1995	2005	2015	2025
Count	1210	1132	1139	1161
Difference		−6.44%	+0.61%	+1.93%

Population statistic
Year	2024	2025
Count	1161	1161
Difference		+0%

It has a population of 1161 people (31 December 2025).

=== Ethnicity ===
Census 2021 (1+ %)
Ethnicity	Number	Fraction
Slovak	1148	96.79%
Not found out	26	2.19%
Total	1186	

In year 2021 was 1186 people by ethnicity 1148 as Slovak, 26 as Not found out, 10 as Rusyn, 7 as Czech, 5 as Ukrainian, 4 as Bulgarian, 4 as English, 3 as Russian, 3 as Polish, 3 as Other, 2 as Romani and 2 as Hungarian.

Note on population: The difference values of population numbers in the table "Population statistic" and in the sections "Ethnicity" & "Religion" is caused by the use of various statistical methods.

=== Religion ===
Census 2021 (1+ %)
Religion	Number	Fraction
Roman Catholic Church	658	55.48%
Greek Catholic Church	204	17.2%
None	110	9.27%
Eastern Orthodox Church	73	6.16%
Calvinist Church	42	3.54%
Not found out	35	2.95%
Jehovah's Witnesses	27	2.28%
Evangelical Church	21	1.77%
Total	1186	

In year 2021 was 1186 people by religion 658 from Roman Catholic Church, 204 from Greek Catholic Church, 110 from None, 73 from Eastern Orthodox Church, 42 from Calvinist Church, 35 from Not found out, 27 from Jehovah's Witnesses, 21 from Evangelical Church, 6 from Ad hoc movements, 5 from Paganism and natural spirituality, 2 from Apostolic Church, 1 from Jewish community, 1 from Other and 1 from Church of the Brethren.

== Gallery ==
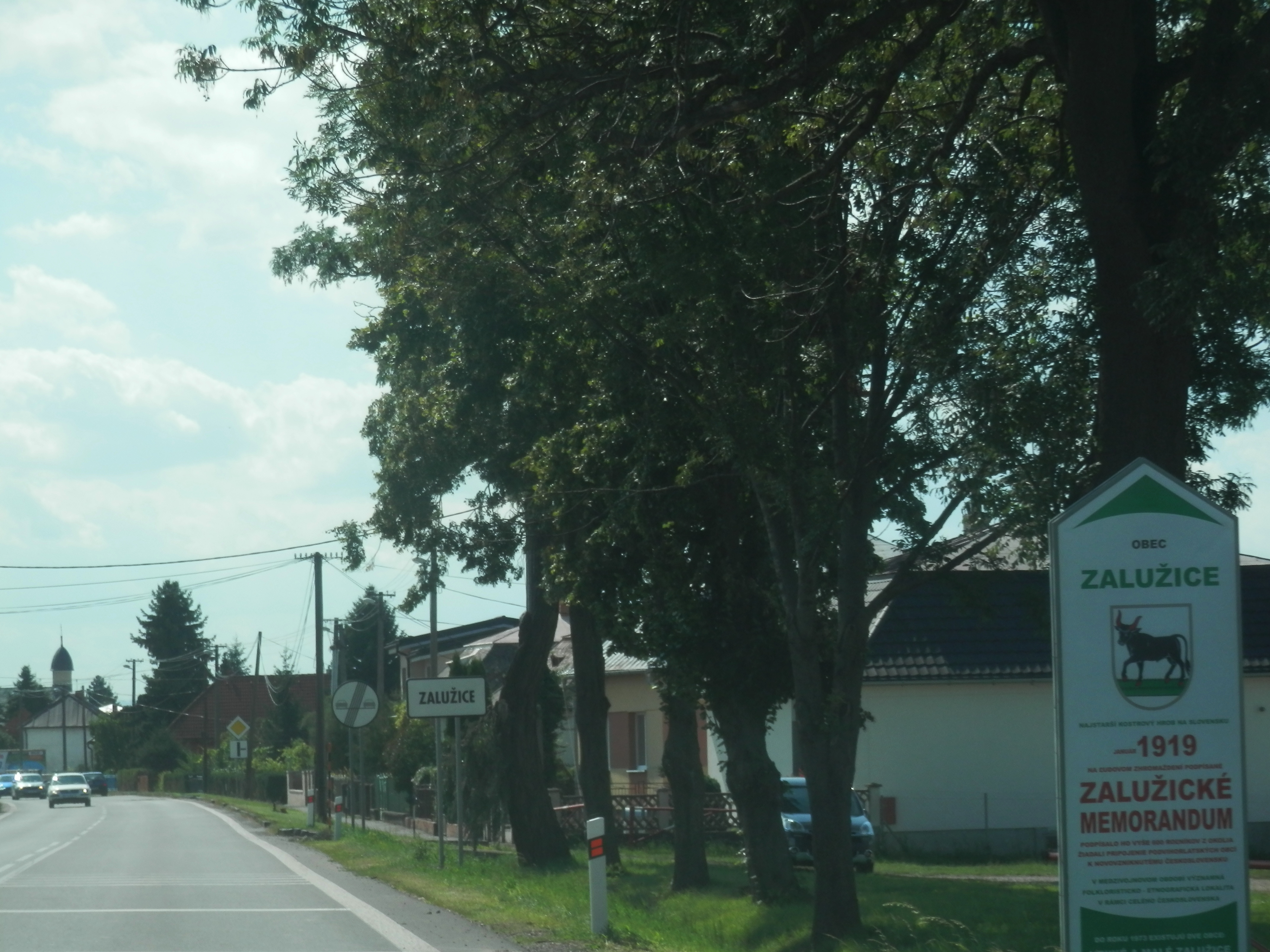
Entering the village of Zalužice

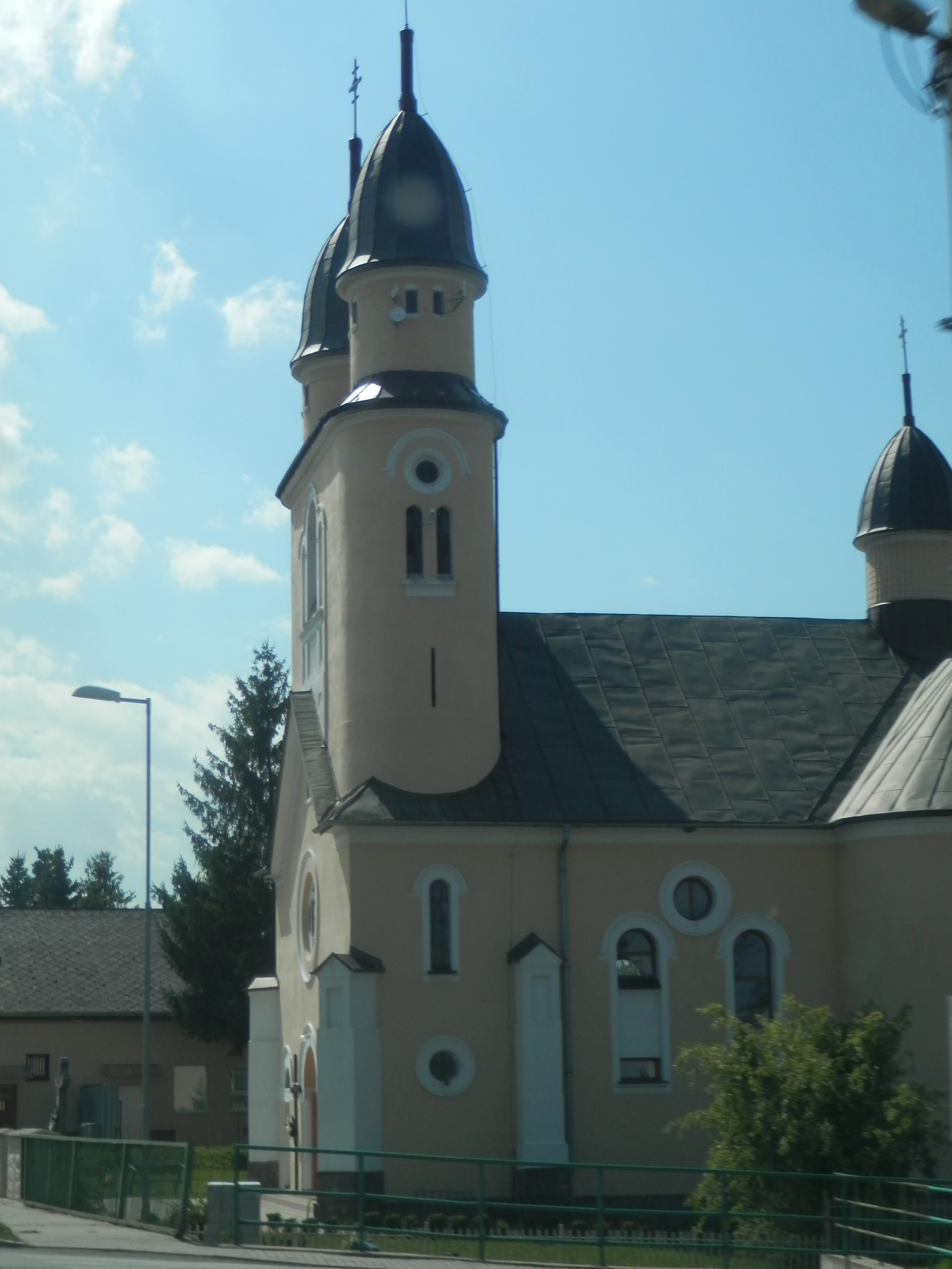
Greek Catholic Church of the Holy Trinity in Zalužice

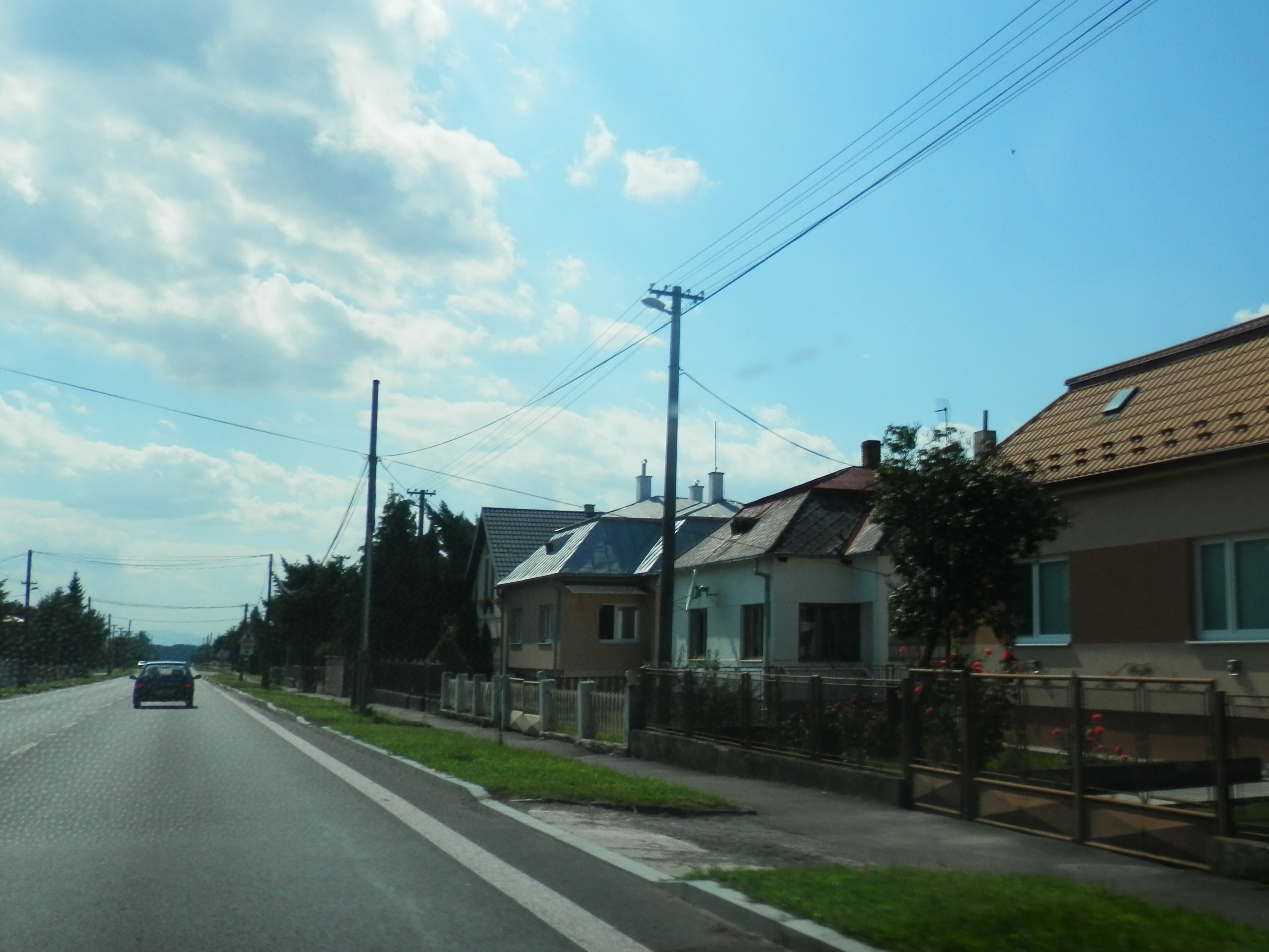
Main street in Zalužice

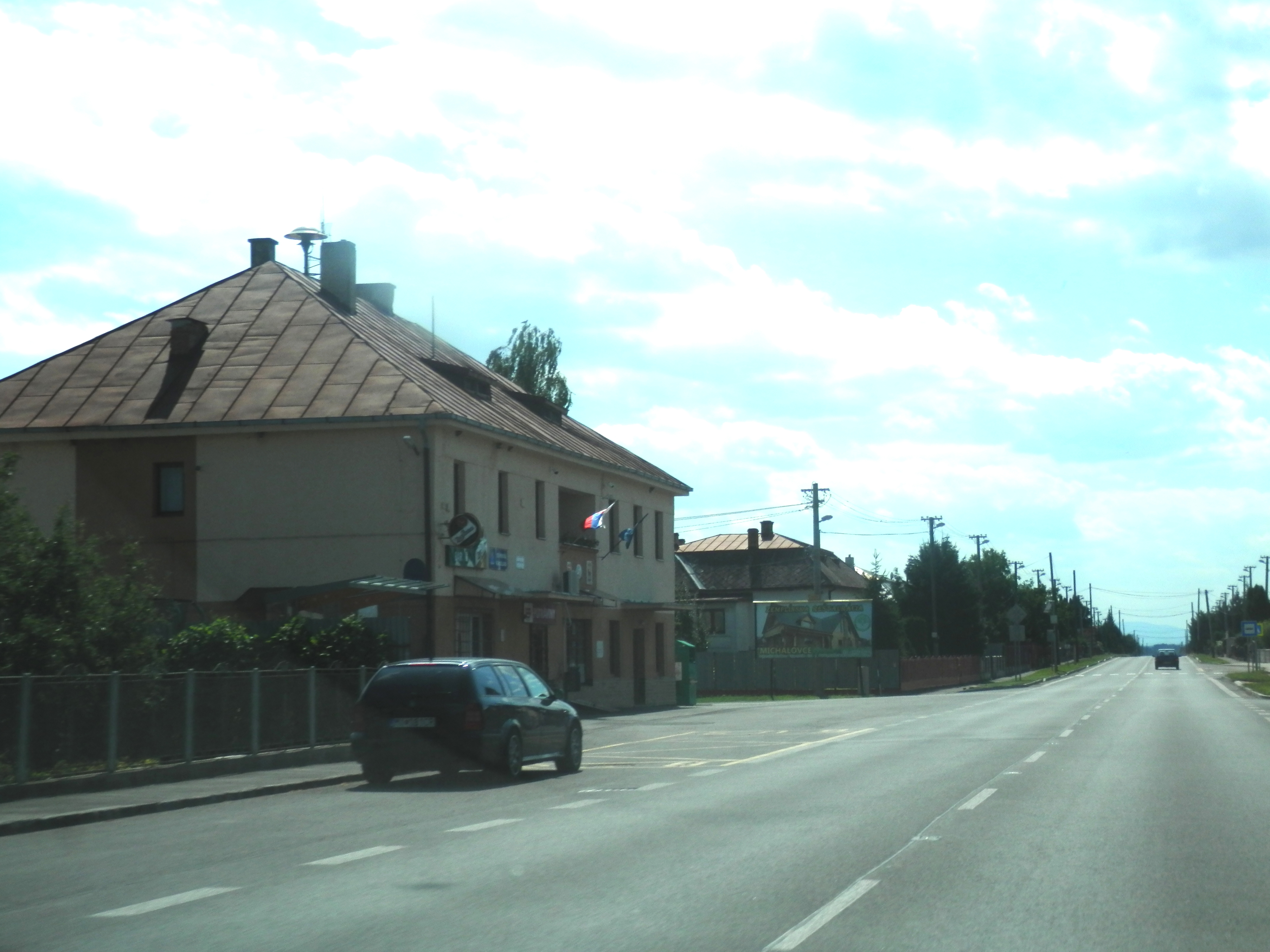
Municipal office in Zalužice

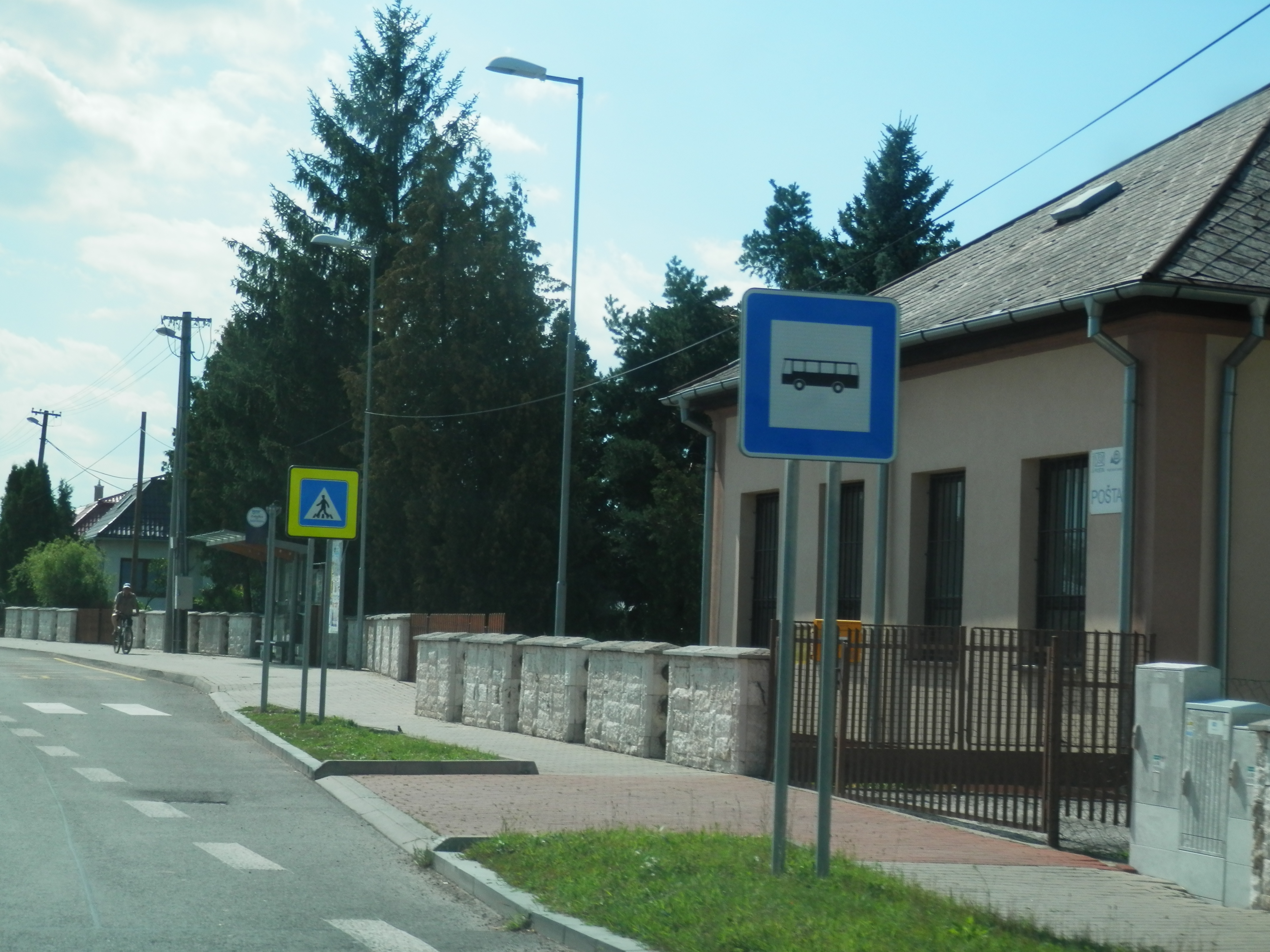
Post office in Zalužice

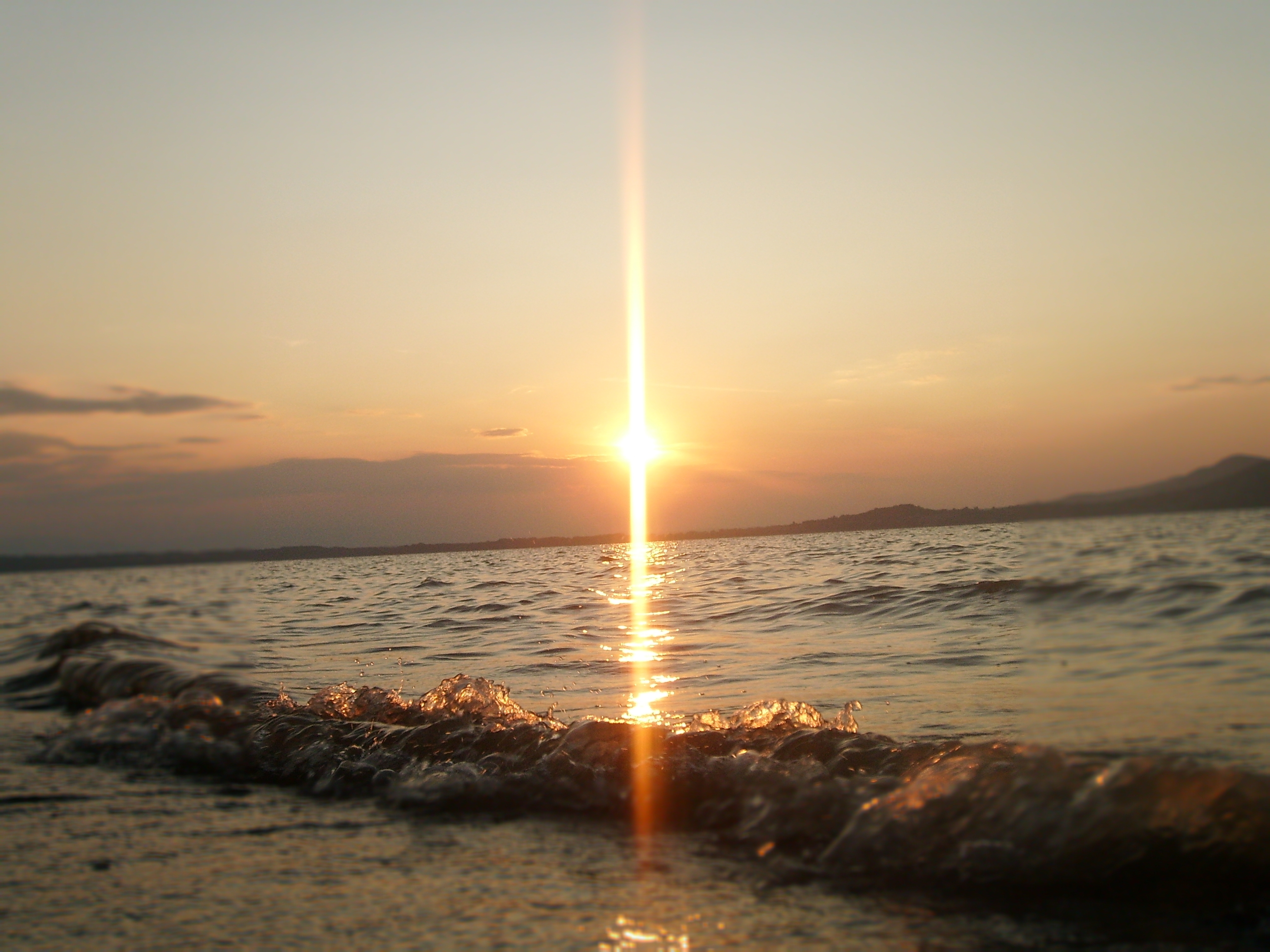
Sunset over the Zemplínska Šírava reservoir's shoreline near Zalužice during autumn (November 2007)

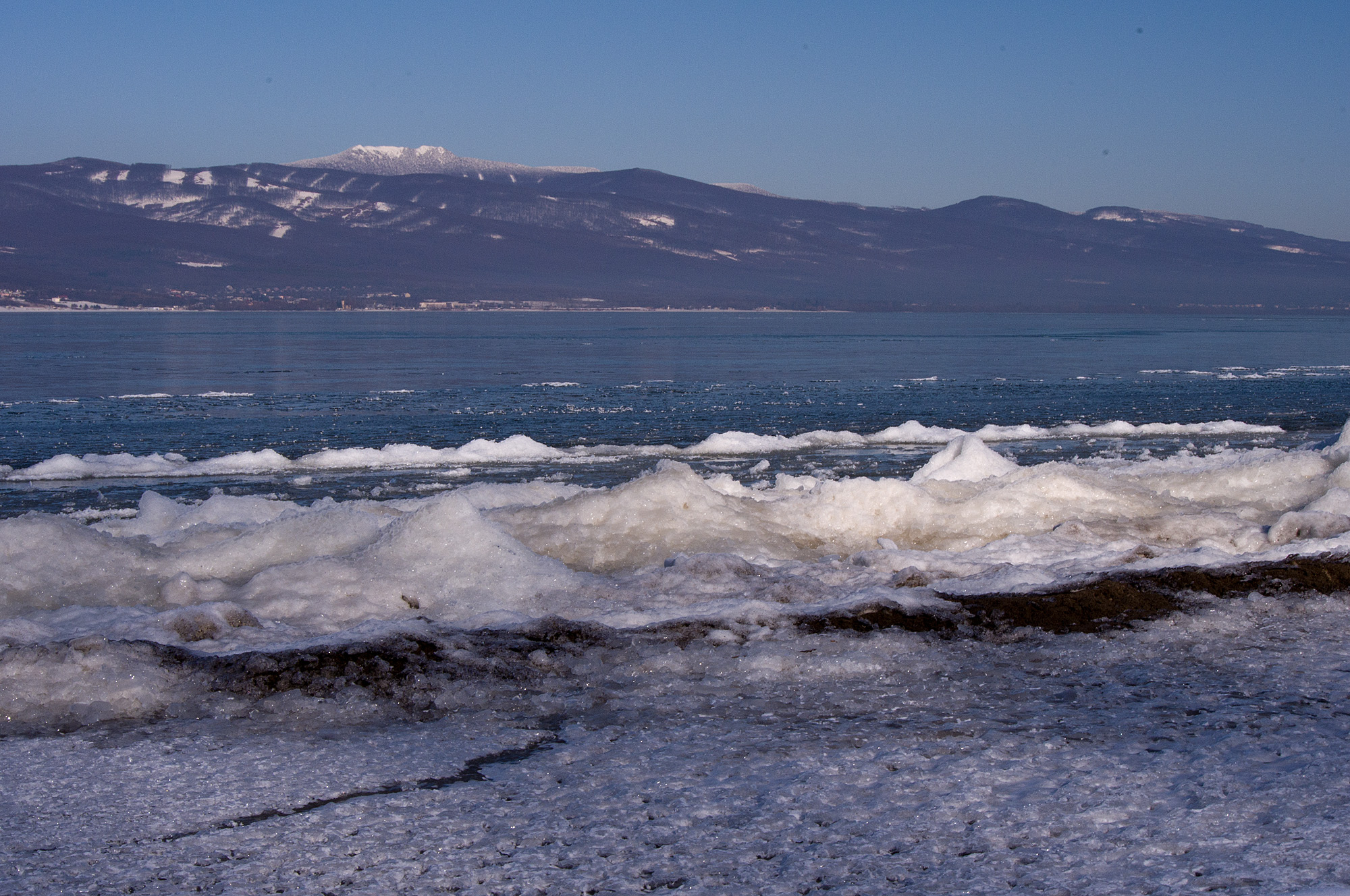
The southern shore of Zemplínska Šírava reservoir near Zalužice during winter (January 2012)

== See also ==
- List of municipalities and towns in Michalovce District
- List of municipalities and towns in Slovakia
