= Malé Raškovce =

Municipality of Slovakia

Malé Raškovce Kisráska
- Municipality
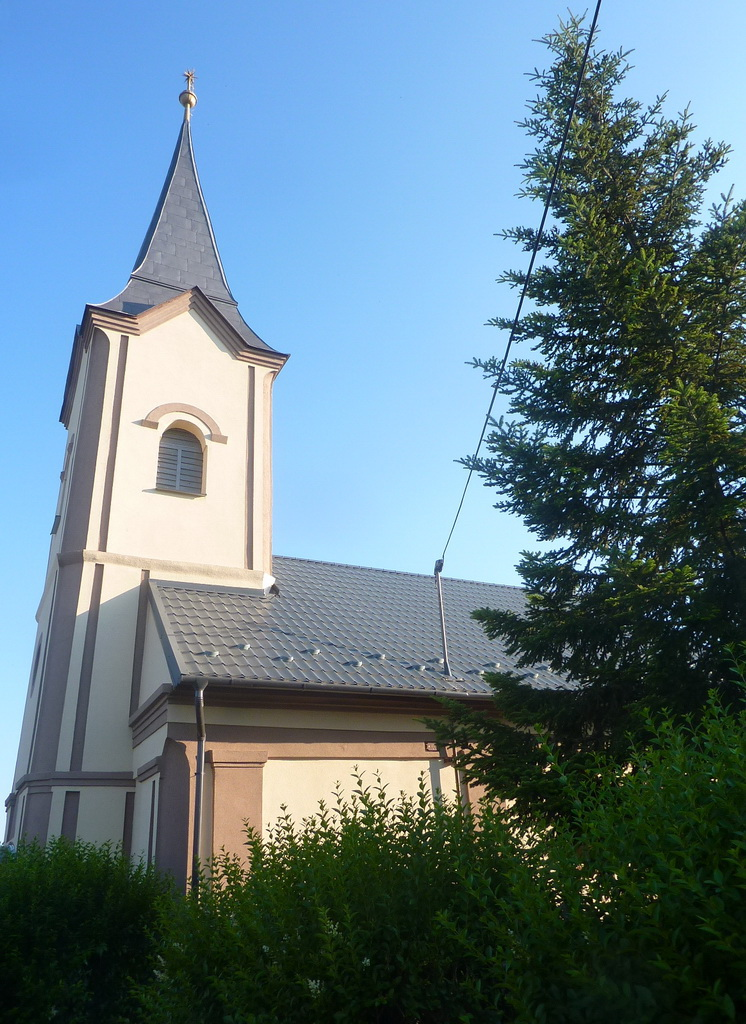

- Flag

- Location of Malé Raškovce in the Košice Region Location of Malé Raškovce in Slovakia
- Coordinates: 48.57°N 21.92°E
- Country: Slovakia
- Region: Košice Region
- District: Michalovce District
- First mentioned: 1478

Area
  - Total: 8.75 km^{2} (3.38 sq mi)
- Elevation: 102 m (335 ft)

Population (2025)
  - Total: 225
- Time zone: UTC+1 (CET)
  - Summer (DST): UTC+2 (CEST)
- Postal code: 721 7
- Area code: +421 56
- Vehicle registration plate (until 2022): MI
- Website: www.maleraskovce.sk

Malé Raškovce (Hungarian: Kisráska) is a village and municipality in Michalovce District in the Košice Region of eastern Slovakia.

== History ==
In historical records the village was first mentioned in 1220.

== Geography ==
The municipality lies at an altitude of 102 metres (335 ft) and covers an area of 8.75 km^{2} (3.38 sq mi) (2025).

== Infrastructure ==
The village has a small general shop and a small village pub.

== Population ==
Population statistic (10 years)
Year	1995	2005	2015	2025
Count	261	237	249	225
Difference		−9.19%	+5.06%	−9.63%

Population statistic
Year	2024	2025
Count	220	225
Difference		+2.27%

It has a population of 225 people (31 December 2025).

=== Ethnicity ===
Census 2021 (1+ %)
Ethnicity	Number	Fraction
Slovak	149	67.11%
Hungarian	102	45.94%
Not found out	10	4.5%
Czech	3	1.35%
Total	222	

In year 2021 was 222 people by ethnicity 149 as Slovak, 102 as Hungarian, 10 as Not found out and 3 as Czech.

Note on population: The difference values of population numbers in the table "Population statistic" and in the sections "Ethnicity" & "Religion" is caused by the use of various statistical methods.

=== Religion ===
Census 2021 (1+ %)
Religion	Number	Fraction
Calvinist Church	117	52.7%
Roman Catholic Church	70	31.53%
Greek Catholic Church	19	8.56%
Evangelical Church	6	2.7%
None	5	2.25%
Not found out	4	1.8%
Total	222	

In year 2021 was 222 people by religion 117 from Calvinist Church, 70 from Roman Catholic Church, 19 from Greek Catholic Church, 6 from Evangelical Church, 5 from None, 4 from Not found out and 1 from Eastern Orthodox Church.

== Culture ==
The village has a local cultural centre, as well as a village green with a stage, a public playground and a football pitch.

== Historical monuments ==
The village has a single church, a Reformed Church building established in 1838.

There is also a memorial to WWII victims in front of the municipal office and a memorial to the Jewish community of the village at the location of the former Jewish cemetery.

== Transport ==
The village has two bus stops with bus shelters next to the main road, at its northern and southern end. Regular bus lines run between the village and Michalovce, and between the village and Veľké Raškovce, Vojany and Veľké Kapušany.

== See also ==
- List of municipalities and towns in Michalovce District
- List of municipalities and towns in Slovakia
