= Dubnik Transmitter =

Coordinates: 48°55′21.9″N 21°27′45.18″E

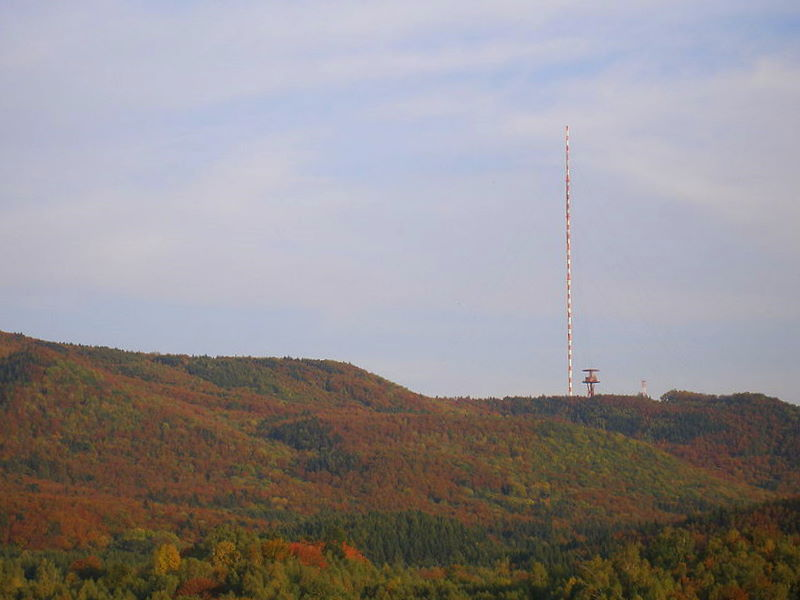
Dubnik transmitter

Dubnik transmitter is a facility for FM-/TV-broadcasting near Dubnik in Slovakia at 21°27'45" E 48°55'26" N. It uses as antenna tower a guyed tubular steel mast, which is similar to that of Suchá Hora transmitter and 318 metres tall and one of the tallest towers in Slovakia. Close to the mast, there is an architectonically interesting telecommunication tower.

== Radiated programmes ==
=== FM ===
Frequency [MHz]	Programm	ERP
87.7	Fun Radio	80.00
96.6	Rádio Slovensko	100.00
98.6	Jemné Melódie	50.00
100.3	Rádio Regina	100.00

=== TV ===
Channel Number	Frequency [MHz]	Programm	Antenna Height	ERP
6		Jednotka; STV	265 m	100 kW
25		Dvojka; STV	300 m	353 kW
59		Markíza	300 m	400 kW
