= Jarok =

Village and municipality in Slovakia

Jarok Íreg
- Municipality
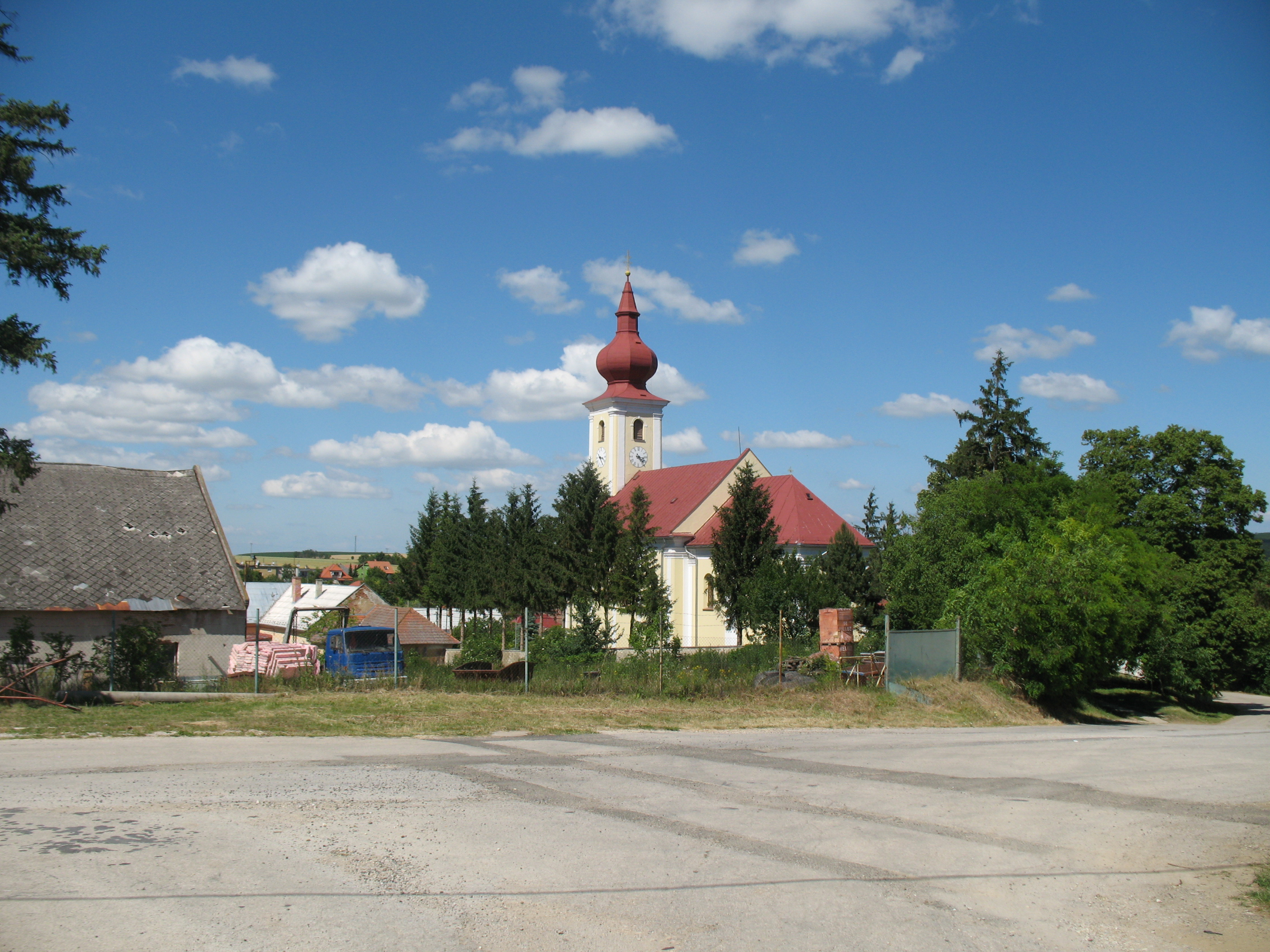

- Flag

- Location of Jarok in the Nitra Region Location of Jarok in Slovakia
- Coordinates: 48.28°N 17.95°E
- Country: Slovakia
- Region: Nitra Region
- District: Nitra District
- First mentioned: 1113

Area
  - Total: 22.11 km^{2} (8.54 sq mi)
- Elevation: 151 m (495 ft)

Population (2025)
  - Total: 2,148
- Time zone: UTC+1 (CET)
  - Summer (DST): UTC+2 (CEST)
- Postal code: 951 48
- Area code: +421 37
- Vehicle registration plate (until 2022): NR
- Website: www.jarok.sk

Jarok (locally known as Íreg;) is a village and municipality in the Nitra District in western central Slovakia, in the Nitra Region. The Veľké Kostoľany transmitter, Slovakia's most powerful broadcasting facility, is situated in the village.

== History ==
In historical records the village was first mentioned in 1113.

== Geography ==
The municipality lies at an altitude of 151 metres (495 ft) and covers an area of 22.11 km^{2} (8.54 sq mi) (2025).

== Population ==
Population statistic (10 years)
Year	1995	2005	2015	2025
Count	1793	1799	1978	2148
Difference		+0.33%	+9.94%	+8.59%

Population statistic
Year	2024	2025
Count	2143	2148
Difference		+0.23%

It has a population of 2148 people (2025-12-31).

== Ethnicity ==
The village is approximately 99% Slovak.

== Facilities ==
The village has a public library, a gym and football pitch.

== Points of interests ==
At Jarok, there is a high power mediumwave broadcasting station. It works on 1098 kHz and uses as antenna tower a 133 metres tall guyed mast. Construction work on facility started in 1984. Inauguration was in 1988.

== See also ==
- List of municipalities and towns in Slovakia

== Genealogical resources ==
The records for genealogical research are available at the state archive "Statny Archiv in Nitra, Slovakia"

- Roman Catholic church records (births/marriages/deaths): 1763-1895 (parish A)
