= Suchá Hora transmitter =

Suchá hora
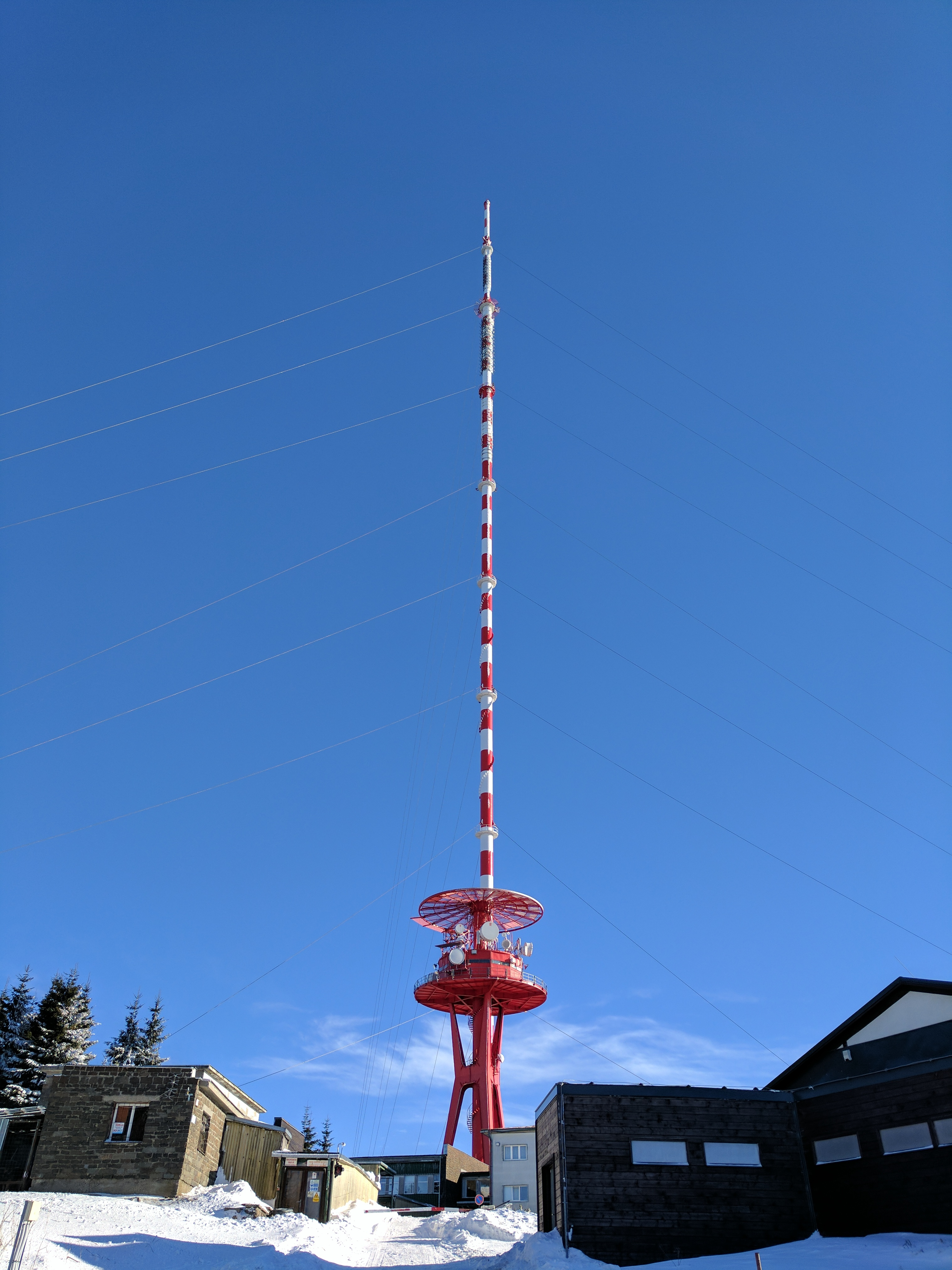
- Transmitter Suchá Hora

- Location in Slovakia
- Location: Kremnica Mountains
- Mast height: 300 metres (984 ft)
- Coordinates: 48°44′19″N 18°59′46″E
- Built: 28.10.1960

Suchá Hora transmitter is a facility for FM- and TV-transmission on 1,231.6 metres high mountain Skalka (Kremnica Mountains) near Banská Bystrica in Slovakia. Suchá Hora transmitter uses as antenna mast a 312 metres tall guyed tubular mast, which is one of the tallest structure of Slovakia and one of the highest elevated supertall structures in Europe. The mast of Suchá Hora transmitter was built in 1960. The transmitter went on service on October 28, 1960. In 1961 a storm blasted the roof of the transmitter building away and in 1962 the 7 ton weighing TV broadcasting antenna, which was covered with ice, fell from 300 metres height to the ground and impacted close to the transmitter building. Close to the tower, there is a small free-standing telecommunication tower built of steel.

== FM ==
Frequency [MHz]	Programm	ERP
87.7	Jemné Melódie	10.00 kW
90.1	Rádio Slovensko - SRO 1	100.00 kW
97.6	Rádio Anténa Rock	100.00 kW
101.5	Rádio Regina	100.00 kW
104.0	Fun Radio	100.00 kW
106.0	Europa 2	50.00 kW

== TV ==
Channel Number	Frequency [MHz]	Programm	Antenna Height	ERP
7		Jednotka; STV	266 m	85 kW
32		Dvojka; STV	300 m	360 kW
49		Markíza	300 m	400 kW

== Gallery ==
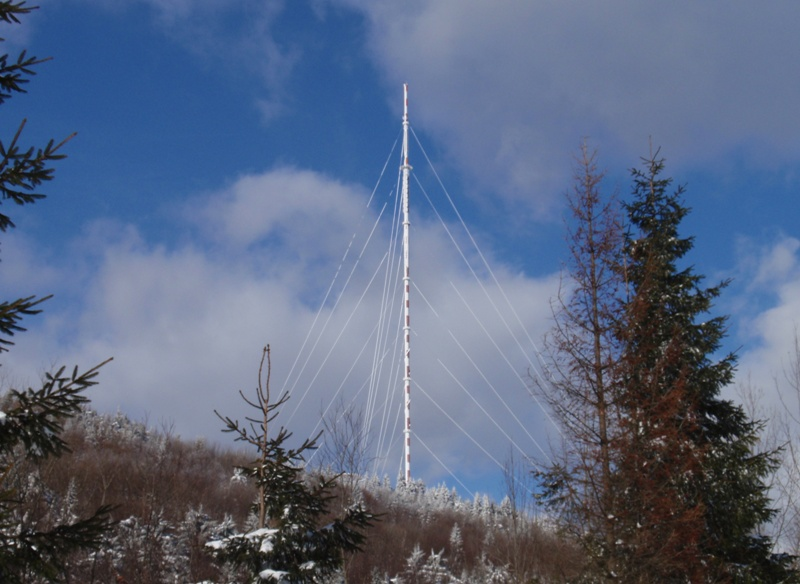

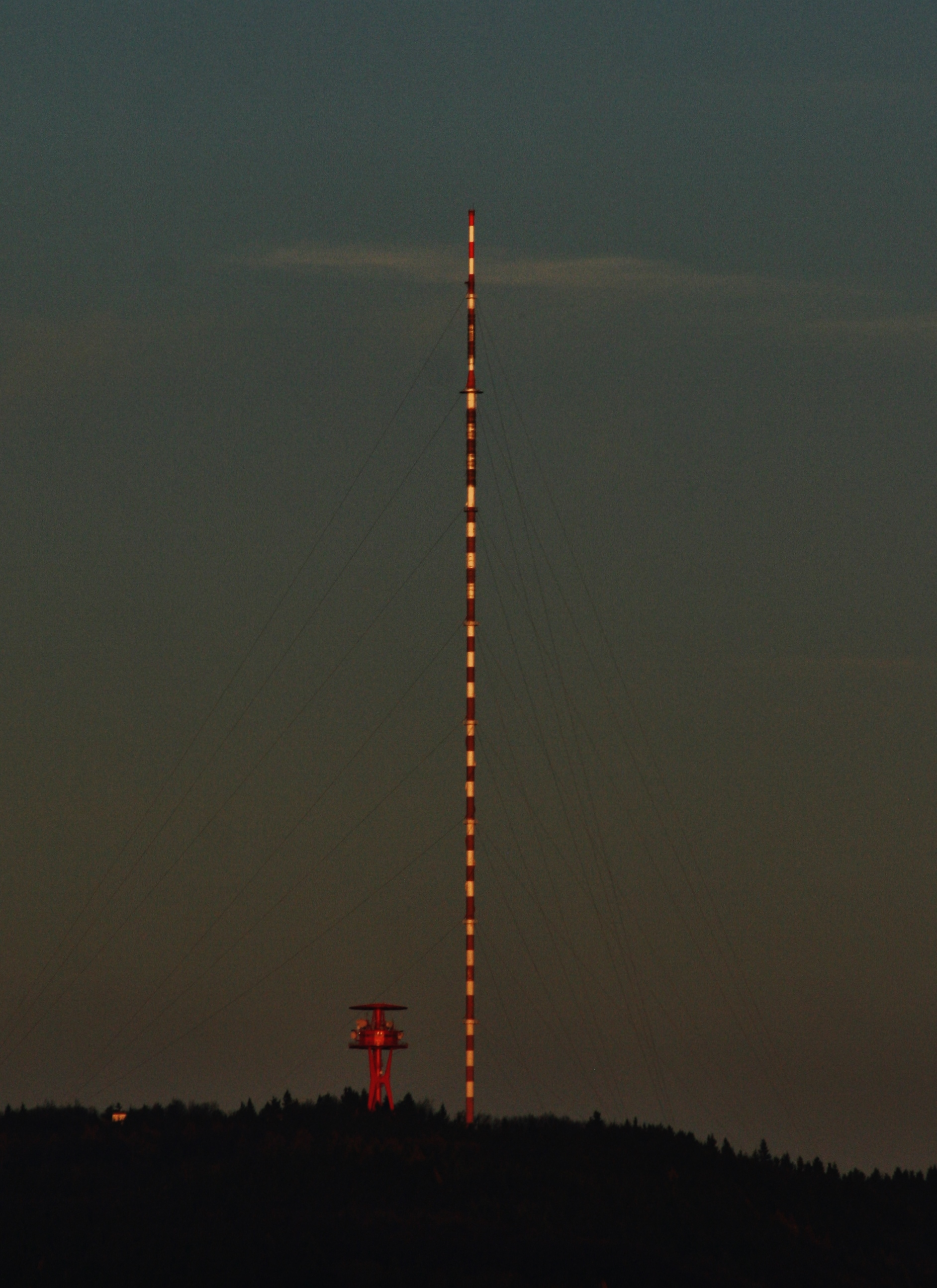
An evening view from Krahule (5.5 km)

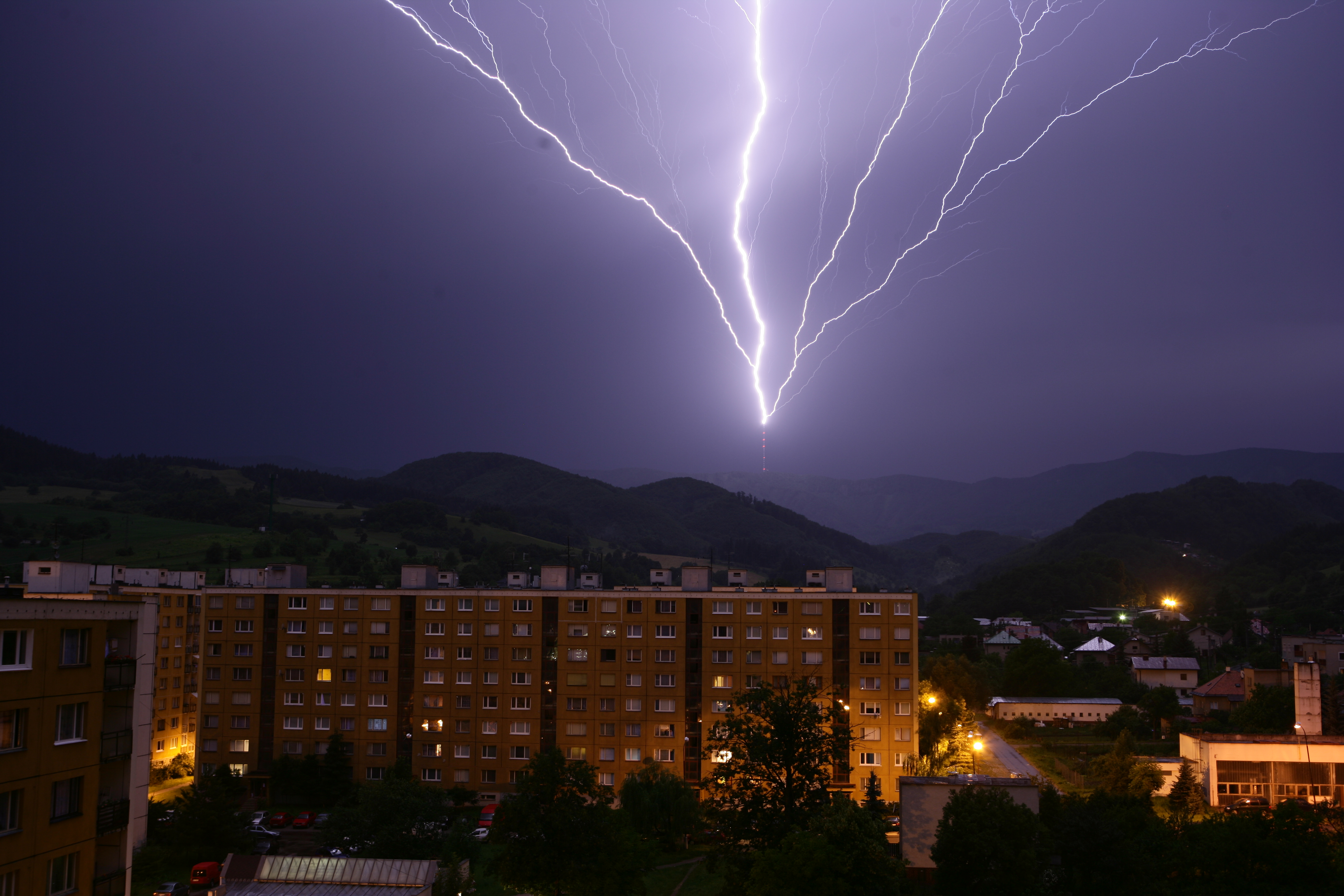
A lightning struck the mast

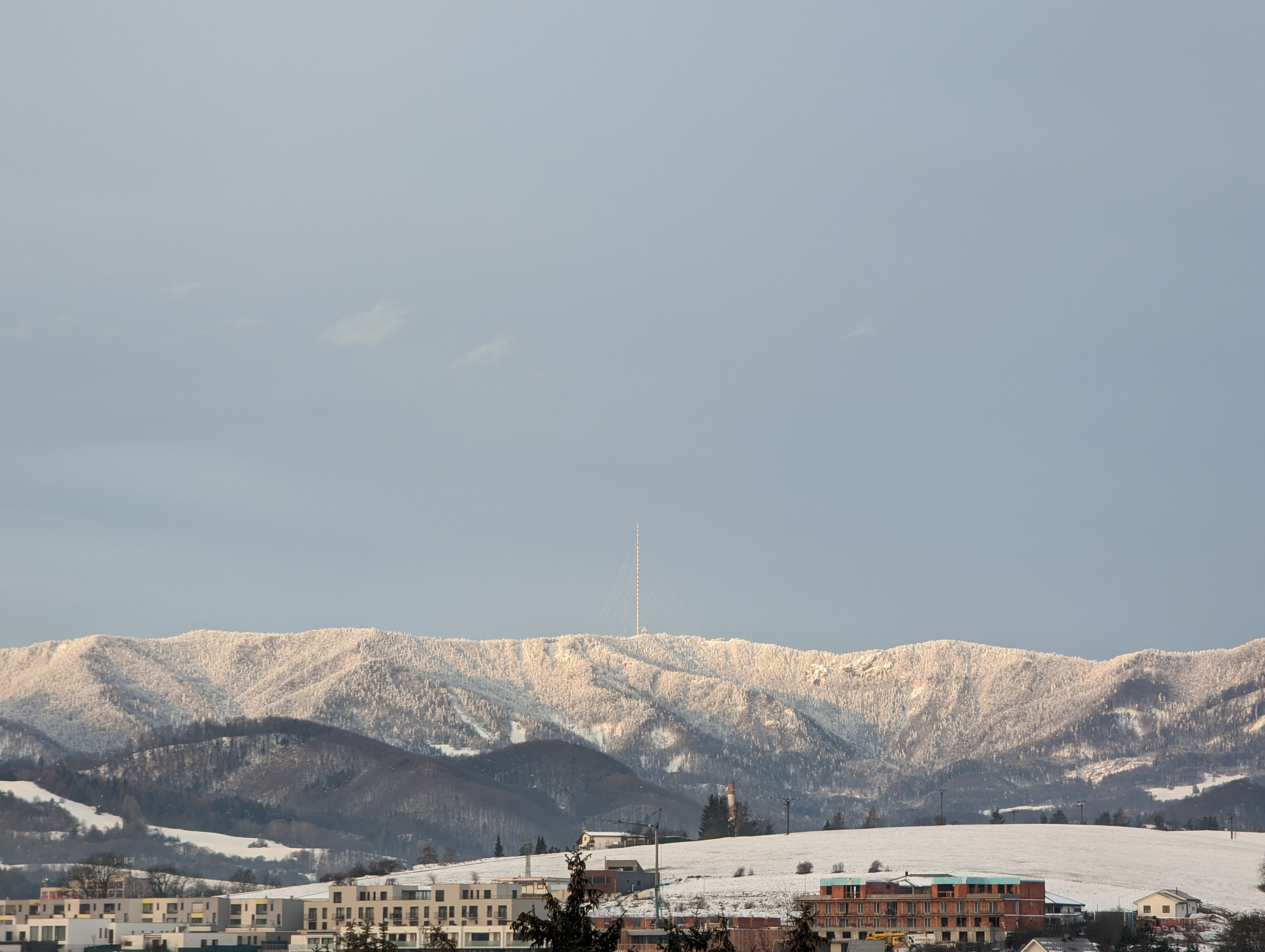
A view of the transmitter mast from a distance over 11 km (7 miles)

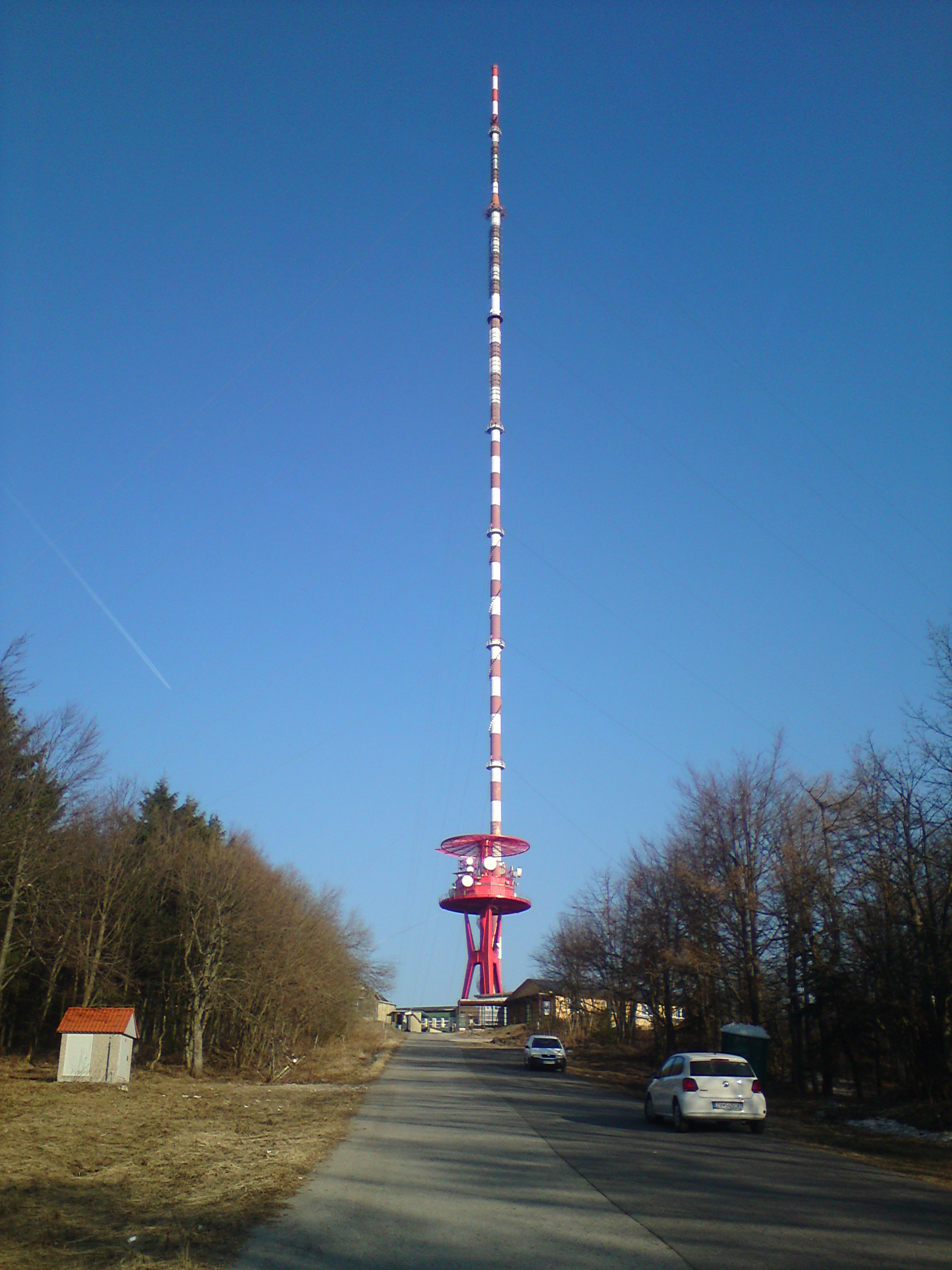

== See also ==
- Dubnik Transmitter
