= Petrovany =

Village and municipality in Slovakia

- Municipality
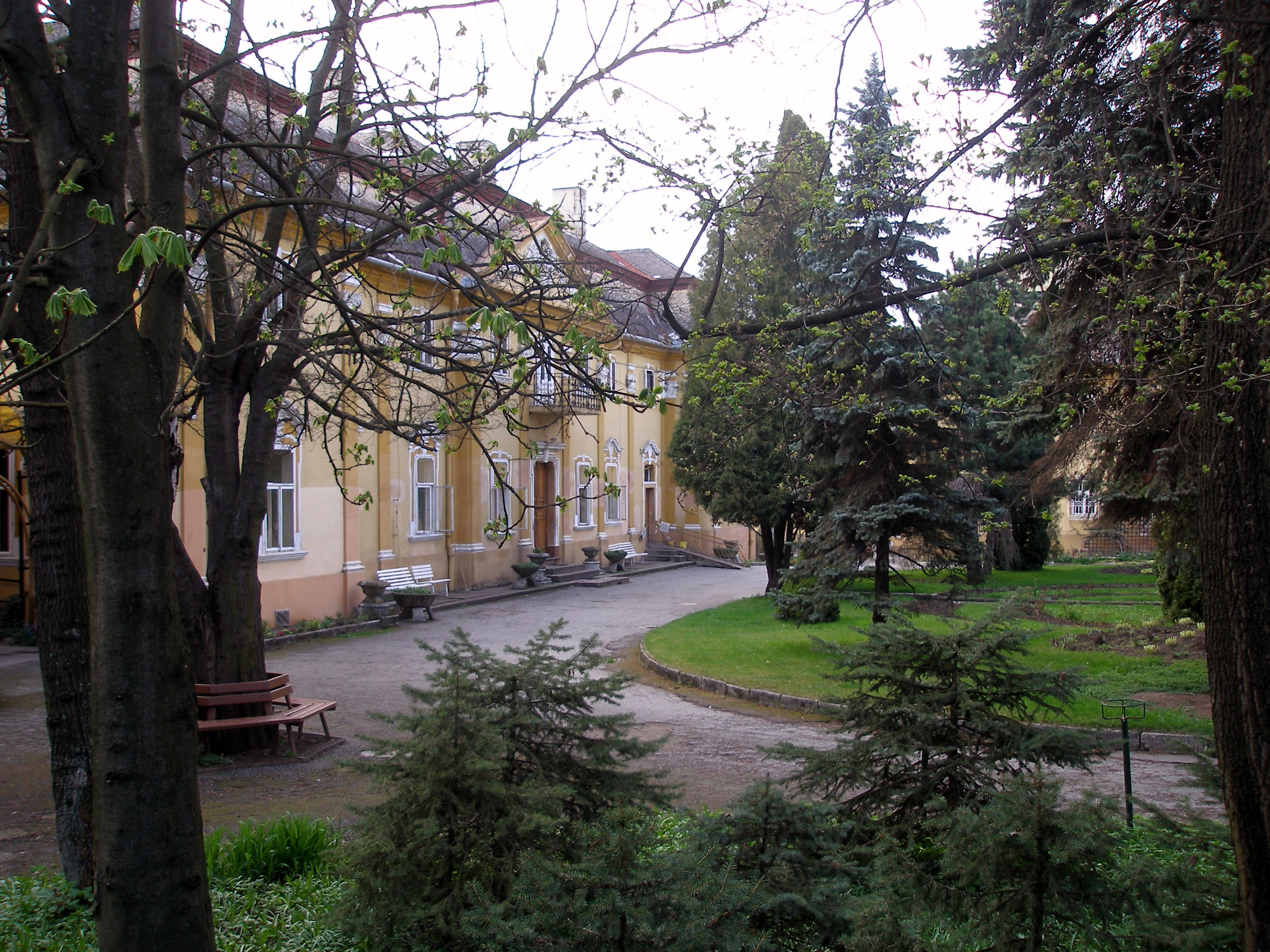

- Flag

- Location of Petrovany in the Prešov Region Location of Petrovany in Slovakia
- Coordinates: 48.92°N 21.27°E
- Country: Slovakia
- Region: Prešov Region
- District: Prešov District
- First mentioned: 1304

Area
  - Total: 17.50 km^{2} (6.76 sq mi)
- Elevation: 257 m (843 ft)

Population (2025)
  - Total: 2,042
- Time zone: UTC+1 (CET)
  - Summer (DST): UTC+2 (CEST)
- Postal code: 825 3
- Area code: +421 51
- Vehicle registration plate (until 2022): PO
- Website: www.petrovany.sk

Petrovany (Hungarian: Tarcaszentpéter) is a village and municipality in Prešov District in the Prešov Region of eastern Slovakia.

== History ==
In historical records the village was first mentioned in 1304.

== Geography ==
The municipality lies at an altitude of 257 metres (843 ft) and covers an area of 17.50 km^{2} (6.76 sq mi) (2025).

== Population ==
Population statistic (10 years)
Year	1995	2005	2015	2025
Count	1636	1801	1893	2042
Difference		+10.08%	+5.10%	+7.87%

Population statistic
Year	2024	2025
Count	2036	2042
Difference		+0.29%

It has a population of 2042 people (31 December 2025).

=== Ethnicity ===
Census 2021 (1+ %)
Ethnicity	Number	Fraction
Slovak	1869	94.58%
Romani	199	10.07%
Not found out	83	4.2%
Total	1976	

In year 2021 was 1976 people by ethnicity 1869 as Slovak, 199 as Romani, 83 as Not found out, 9 as Czech, 8 as Rusyn, 6 as English, 5 as German, 4 as Ukrainian, 3 as Other, 1 as Russian, 1 as Hungarian and 1 as Canadian.

Note on population: The difference values of population numbers in the table "Population statistic" and in the sections "Ethnicity" & "Religion" is caused by the use of various statistical methods.

=== Religion ===
Census 2021 (1+ %)
Religion	Number	Fraction
Roman Catholic Church	1538	77.83%
None	118	5.97%
Evangelical Church	104	5.26%
Not found out	80	4.05%
Greek Catholic Church	68	3.44%
Apostolic Church	22	1.11%
Christian Congregations in Slovakia	21	1.06%
Total	1976	

In year 2021 was 1976 people by religion 1538 from Roman Catholic Church, 118 from None, 104 from Evangelical Church, 80 from Not found out, 68 from Greek Catholic Church, 22 from Apostolic Church, 21 from Christian Congregations in Slovakia, 9 from Jehovah's Witnesses, 4 from Eastern Orthodox Church, 4 from Ad hoc movements, 2 from Calvinist Church, 2 from Other, 2 from United Methodist Church, 1 from Other and not ascertained christian church and 1 from Seventh-day Adventist Church.
