= Vojany Power Station =

Coal-fired plant in Slovakia

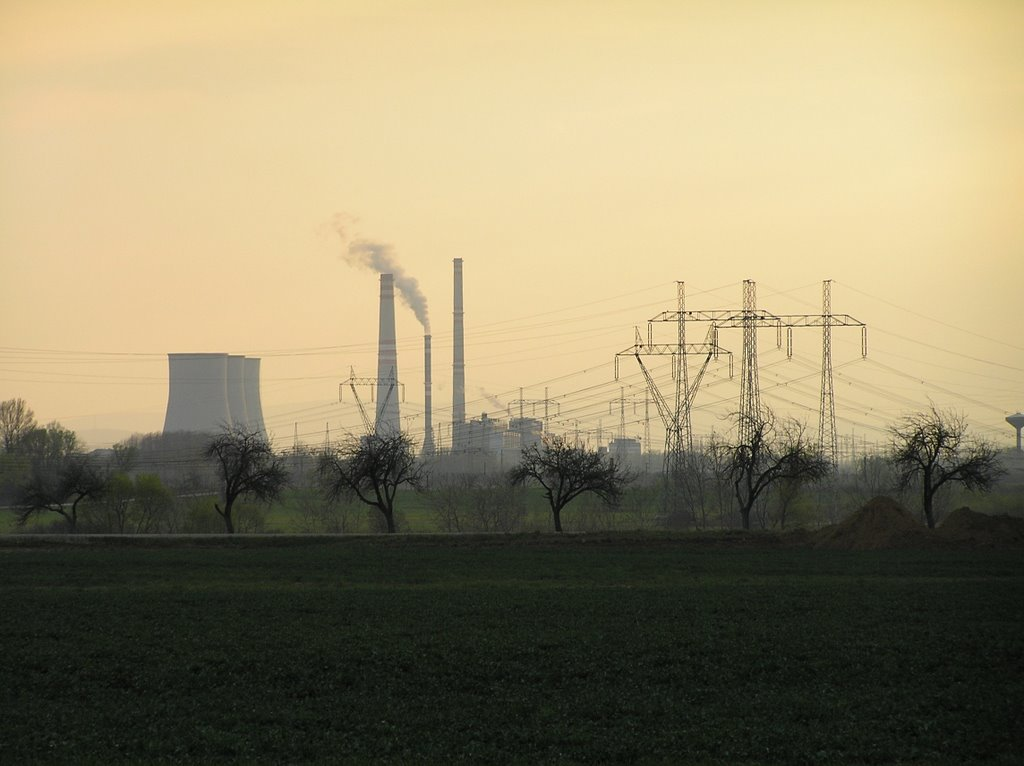
- Location of the Vojany Power Station
- Official name: Elektráreň Vojany
- Country: Slovakia
- Location: Vojany
- Coordinates: 48°33′13″N 21°58′41″E
- Status: Decommissioned
- Construction began: 1961
- Commission date: 1966
- Decommission date: 26 March 2024
- Owner: Slovenské elektrárne
- Operator: Slovenské elektrárne

Thermal power station
- Primary fuel: Coal
- Secondary fuel: Natural gas
- Tertiary fuel: Fuel oil

Power generation
- Units operational: 12 x 110 MW
- Make and model: Škoda
- Nameplate capacity: 1,320 MW

External links
- Commons: Related media on Commons

Vojany Power Station was a thermal power station at Vojany, Slovakia. It consists of 12 units, with 110 MW generation capacity each. Planning of the first plant began in 1959, the project was approved in 1960, and construction began in 1961. It was commissioned in 1966. The second plant was approved in 1966, construction started in 1968, and it was commissioned in 1973–1974.

The first plant was designed to use semi-anthracite coal imported from Ukraine by a purpose-built wide-gauge rail line. Cooling water is supplied from the Zemplínska Šírava reservoir. Its flue gas stack is 200 metres (656 ft) tall.

The second plant uses heavy fuel oil. Between 1979 and 1985 it was modernized to use also natural gas. Its flue gas stack, which was completed in 1974, was originally 300 metres (984 ft) tall. In 1998, its height was reduced to 175 metres (574 ft).

The operator of the power plant, Slovenské elektrárne, shut down the Vojany power plant from operation on 26 March 2024. This decommissioning ended the production of electricity from coal in Slovakia. Future use of this area as a solar park or battery storage is being considered.
