= Vojany =

Village and municipality in Slovakia

Vojany Vaján
- Municipality
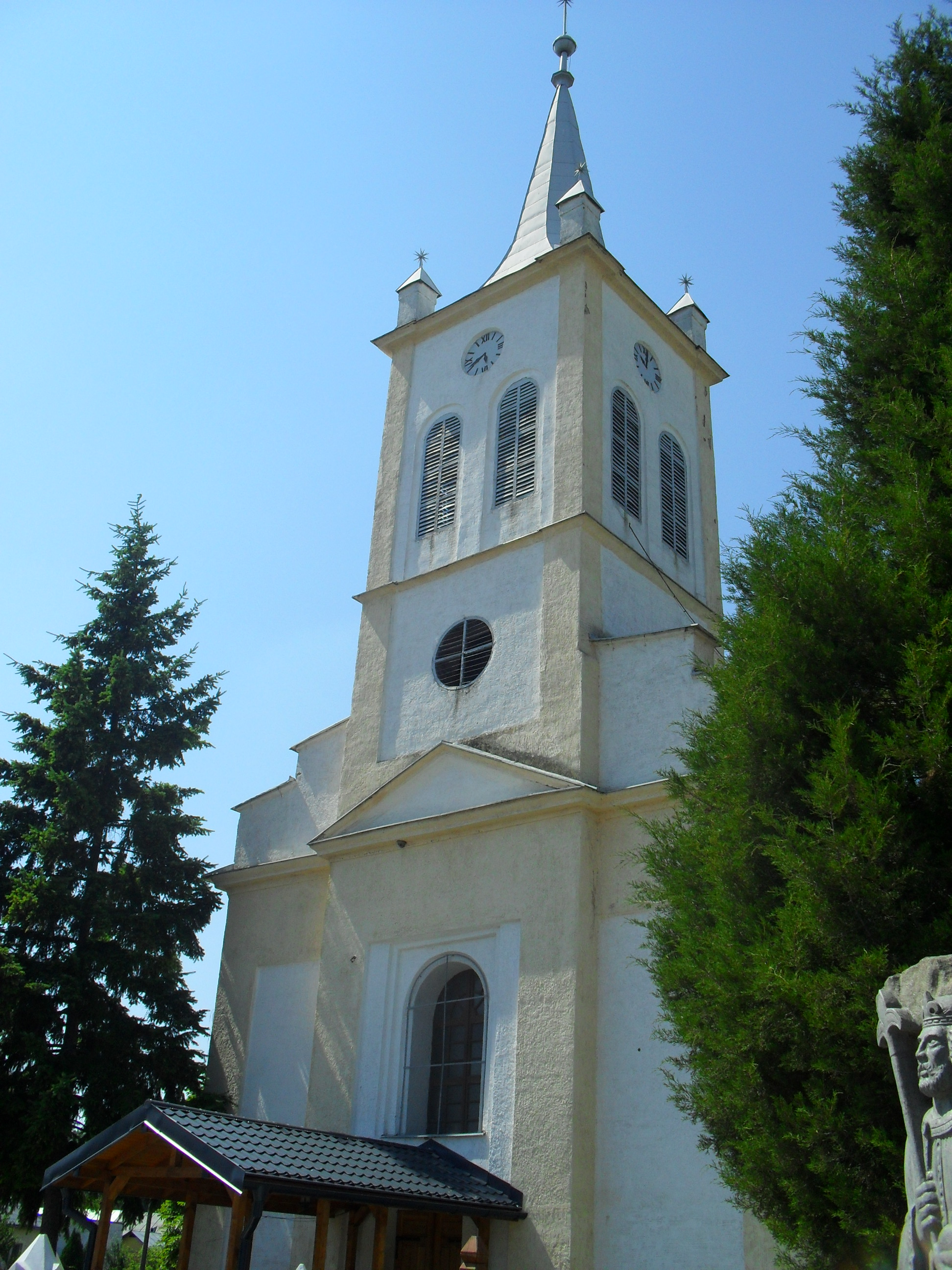

- Flag Coat of arms

- Location of Vojany in the Košice Region Location of Vojany in Slovakia
- Coordinates: 48.57°N 21.98°E
- Country: Slovakia
- Region: Košice Region
- District: Michalovce District
- First mentioned: 1323

Area
  - Total: 10.92 km^{2} (4.22 sq mi)
- Elevation: 101 m (331 ft)

Population (2025)
  - Total: 966
- Time zone: UTC+1 (CET)
  - Summer (DST): UTC+2 (CEST)
- Postal code: 767 2
- Area code: +421 56
- Vehicle registration plate (until 2022): MI
- Website: www.vojany.sk

Vojany (Hungarian: Vaján) is a village and municipality in Michalovce District in the Kosice Region of eastern Slovakia.

== History ==
In historical records the village was first mentioned in 1323.

== Geography ==
The municipality lies at an altitude of 101 metres (331 ft) and covers an area of 10.92 km^{2} (4.22 sq mi) (2025).

== Population ==
Population statistic (10 years)
Year	1995	2005	2015	2025
Count	711	828	894	966
Difference		+16.45%	+7.97%	+8.05%

Population statistic
Year	2024	2025
Count	950	966
Difference		+1.68%

It has a population of 966 people (31 December 2025).

=== Ethnicity ===
Census 2021 (1+ %)
Ethnicity	Number	Fraction
Hungarian	501	54.45%
Romani	256	27.82%
Slovak	248	26.95%
Not found out	101	10.97%
Total	920	

In year 2021 was 920 people by ethnicity 501 as Hungarian, 256 as Romani, 248 as Slovak, 101 as Not found out, 7 as Ukrainian, 3 as Czech, 1 as Rusyn, 1 as Russian, 1 as Romanian and 1 as Other.

Note on population: The difference values of population numbers in the table "Population statistic" and in the sections "Ethnicity" & "Religion" is caused by the use of various statistical methods.

=== Religion ===
Census 2021 (1+ %)
Religion	Number	Fraction
Calvinist Church	423	45.98%
Roman Catholic Church	166	18.04%
None	123	13.37%
Not found out	112	12.17%
Greek Catholic Church	47	5.11%
Evangelical Church	27	2.93%
Total	920	

In year 2021 was 920 people by religion 423 from Calvinist Church, 166 from Roman Catholic Church, 123 from None, 112 from Not found out, 47 from Greek Catholic Church, 27 from Evangelical Church, 8 from Eastern Orthodox Church, 7 from Jehovah's Witnesses, 3 from Christian Congregations in Slovakia, 2 from United Methodist Church, 1 from Other and not ascertained christian church and 1 from Buddhism.

== Culture ==
The village has a public library, and a football pitch. It also has a doctors surgery.

== Transport ==
The village has a railway station.

== Economy ==
- Vojany Power Station
