= Zemplínska šírava =

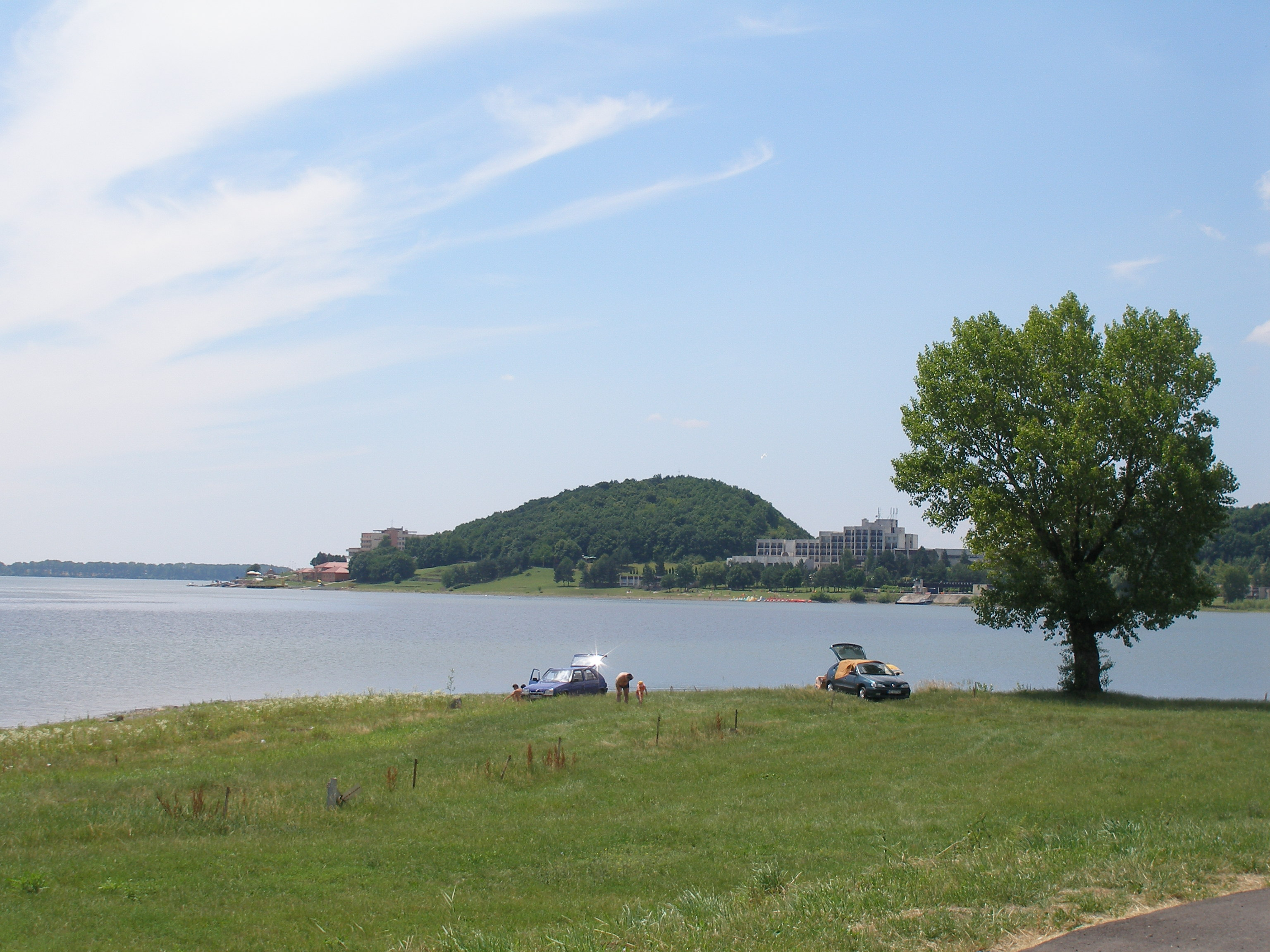

- Location within Slovakia
- Location: Michalovce district
- Coordinates: 48°47′0″N 22°02′12″E
- Type: reservoir
- Primary inflows: Laborec
- Primary outflows: Laborec
- Basin countries: Slovakia
- Max. length: 11 km (6.8 mi)
- Max. width: 3.5 km (2.2 mi)
- Surface area: 33 km^{2} (13 sq mi)
- Average depth: 9.5 m (31 ft)
- Max. depth: 14 m (46 ft)
- Water volume: 334 million cubic metres (271,000 acre⋅ft)
- Settlements: Hôrka, Medvedia hora, Kamenec, Paľkov, Biela hora

Zemplínska šírava (sometimes called the "Slovak sea" (Slovak: Slovenské more, Hungarian: Széles-tó). is a reservoir in eastern Slovakia, near the town of Michalovce, wholly belonging to the Michalovce District. The name recalls the historical Zemplín region. The dam was built in 1961–1965, covers an area of 33 km^{2} (13 sq mi), has an average depth of 9.5 m (31 ft), with a maximum depth of 14 m (46 ft). Water from the dam flows into the Laborec river, which in turn flows into the Bodrog river. The area is primarily used for recreation. It also supplies cooling water for the Vojany Power Station.

== Panorama ==
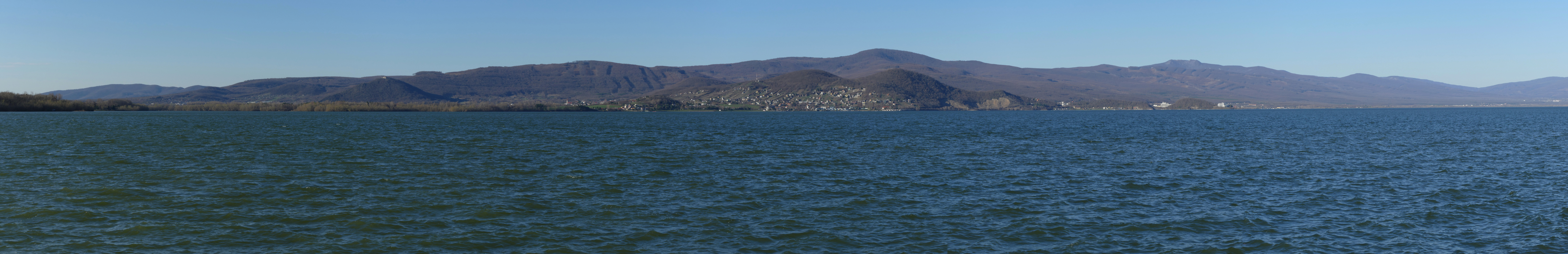
Panorama of Zemplínska šírava and Vihorlat Mountains (Vihorlatské vrchy)
