= Veľké Kostoľany transmitter =

Transmission facility

Coordinates: 48°31′06″N 17°43′24″E

The Velke Kostolany transmitter was the transmission facility of the Slovakian broadcasting company. It was situated north of Velke Kostolany. It was inaugurated in 1949 and was used for medium wave and short wave broadcasting. For medium wave broadcasting a 140 metres tall guyed mast was used. Until 2003 it transmitted in the medium wave band on 1098 kHz with omnidirectional radiation.
