= List of power stations in Poland =

The following page lists all power stations in Poland.

== Coal ==
Name	Location	Coordinates	Fuel	Capacity, MWe	Operational	Notes and references
Bełchatów Power Station	Bełchatów	51°15′59″N 19°19′50″E	Lignite	5,102	1982	
Kozienice Power Station	Kozienice	51°39′48″N 21°27′52″E	Coal, biomass	4,016	1973	Also provides 266 MWth of heat
Opole Power Plant	Opole	50°45′04″N 17°52′57″E	Coal	3,342		
Turów Power Station	Bogatynia	50°56′45″N 14°54′53″E	Lignite	1,950		7 TWh/y and 180 GW_{t}h/y (2015)
Połaniec Power Station	Połaniec	50°26′14″N 21°20′13″E	Coal	1,800		
Rybnik Power Station	Rybnik	50°08′04″N 18°31′22″E	Coal	1,775	1974	
Dolna Odra Power Station	Nowe Czarnowo	53°12′24″N 14°27′59″E	Coal	1,772	1974	2018: 1362 MW of electric and 100 MW of heat power to Gryfino
Pątnów Power Station	Konin	52°18′05″N 18°14′03″E	Lignite	1,674		
Jaworzno Power Station	Jaworzno	50°12′25″N 19°12′18″E	Coal	1,535		
Łaziska Power Station	Łaziska Górne	50°07′58″N 18°50′47″E	Coal	1,155	1963	
Łagisza Power Station	Będzin	50°20′59″N 19°08′32″E	Coal, biomass	1,060		
Ostrołęka Power Station	Ostrołęka	53°06′14″N 21°36′42″E	Coal, biomass	740		
Siersza Power Station	Trzebinia	50°12′31″N 19°27′39″E	Coal	666		
Siekierki Heat Power Station	Warsaw-Siekierki	52°11′13″N 21°05′19″E	Coal	622	1961	
Adamów Power Station	Turek	52°00′44″N 18°32′34″E	Lignite	600		
Białystok Power Station	Białystok	53°08′53″N 23°10′08″E	Coal	505	1967	
Skawina Power Station	Skawina	49°58′35″N 19°48′26″E	Coal	490	1957-1961	
Kraków Heat Power Station	Kraków-Łęg	50°03′14″N 20°00′24″E	Coal	460	1977-1985	
Żerań Heat Power Station	Warsaw-Żerań	52°17′41″N 20°59′36″E	Coal, biomass	350		
Stalowa Wola Power Station	Stalowa Wola	50°33′09″N 22°04′52″E	Coal	341		
Poznań Karolin Heat Power Station	Poznań	52°26′11″N 16°59′19″E	Coal, biomass	276		
Wrocław Heat Power Station	Wrocław	51°07′23″N 17°01′28″E	Coal, biomass	263		
Konin Power Station	Konin	52°17′05″N 18°16′09″E	Lignite	248		
Lublin-Wrotków Heat Power Station	Lublin-Wrotków	51°12′58″N 22°33′34″E	Natural gas	231		
Zielona Góra Heat Power Station	Zielona Góra	51°57′04″N 15°29′20″E	Natural gas, coal	221	1974	
Gdańsk Heat Power Station	Gdańsk	54°22′43″N 18°38′25″E	Coal	217		
Łódź Heat Power Station EC3	Łódź	51°47′53″N 19°25′17″E	Coal	205	1968	
Łódź Heat Power Station EC4	Łódź	51°44′43″N 19°32′16″E	Coal	200	1977	
Bydgoszcz Heat Power Station EC2	Bydgoszcz	53°05′59″N 18°05′20″E	Coal	183		
Blachownia Power Station	Kędzierzyn-Koźle	50°21′23″N 18°17′24″E	Coal	165		
EC Nowa	Dąbrowa Górnicza	50°20′51″N 19°16′34″E	Coal	150		
Katowice Heat Power Station	Katowice	50°17′08″N 19°03′14″E	Coal	135		
Pomorzany Power Station	Szczecin	53°23′27″N 14°31′38″E	Coal	134	1940	
Miechowice Heat Power Station	Bytom	50°20′55″N 18°50′34″E	Coal	125		
Chorzów Heat Power Station	Chorzów	50°18′28″N 18°58′08″E	Coal	113		
Gdynia Heat Power Station	Gdynia	54°33′12″N 18°28′40″E	Coal	105		
Rzeszów Heat Power Station	Rzeszów	50°03′54″N 22°01′50″E	Natural gas	101		
Halemba Power Station	Ruda Śląska	50°13′56″N 18°51′13″E	Coal	100		
Czechnica Heat Power Station	Siechnice	51°02′16″N 17°08′53″E	Coal	100		
Zabrze Heat Power Plant	Zabrze	50°17′56″N 18°48′44″E	Coal	98		
Gorzów Heat Power Station	Gorzów Wielkopolski	52°44′59″N 15°16′09″E	Coal	97		
Łódź Heat Power Station EC-2	Łódź	51°44′31″N 19°16′56″E	Coal	87	1958	
Będzin Power Station	Śląskie	50°18′14″N 19°8′16″E	Coal	81	1975	
Bielsko-Biała Heat Power Station EC1	Bielsko-Biała	49°48′44″N 19°03′15″E	Coal	81		
Szczecin Power Station	Szczecin	53°24′41″N 14°35′14″E	Coal	70	1916	
Bielsko-Północ Heat Power Station EC2	Czechowice-Dziedzice	49°52′30″N 19°01′47″E	Coal	55		
Kielce Heat Power Station	Kielce	50°53′51″N 20°36′59″E	Coal, biomass	10.5		
Szombierki Heat Power Station	Bytom	50°20′42″N 18°53′11″E	Coal	8.8	1920	
Bydgoszcz Heat Power Station EC1	Bydgoszcz	53°08′09″N 17°58′59″E	Coal	4		
Kawęczyn Heat Plant	Warsaw-Kawęczyn	52°16′05″N 21°07′43″E	Coal			Heat only (512 MWth)
Pruszków II Power Plant	Pruszków	52°10′30″N 20°44′33″E			never opened	

== Gas turbines ==
Name	Location	Coordinates	Capacity, MWe	Notes and references
Gorzów Heat and Power Plant	Gorzów Wielkopolski	52°48′N 15°18′E	236.88	CCGT; 791.98 GW_{e}h and 417.56 GW_{t}h as of 2024;
Zielona Góra			190	

== Hydroelectric ==
Name	Location	Coordinates	Capacity, MWe	Ref
Dychów	Lubuskie		90	
Grajówka	Lubuskie		2.79	
Niedzica	Małopolskie		92.75	
Rożnów	Małopolskie		50	
Włocławek	Kujawsko-Pomorskie		160	

== Pumped storage hydroelectric ==
Name	Location	Coordinates	Capacity, MWe	Ref
Solina	Solina		200	
Żar			500	
Żarnowiec	Pomorskie		680	
Żydowo	Wielkopolskie		150	

== Wind ==
Name/location	Voivodeship	Capacity, MWe	Operational
Potęgowo	Pomerania	220	under construction
Margonin	Greater Poland	120	2010
Marszewo I & II	West Pomerania	100	
Kopaniewo (FW Lotnisko)	Pomerania	94.5	2015
Resko I & II	West Pomerania	90.3	
Karścino Wind Farm	West Pomerania	90	2008
Żuromin	Masovia	61.2	2012
Nekla	Greater Poland	52.5	2010
Tymień Wind Farm	West Pomerania	50	
Banie-Kozielice	West Pomerania	50	2015
Pelplin	Pomerania	49	2012
Gawłowice	Kuyavian-Pomeranian	48.3	2014
Łosino near Słupsk	Pomerania	48	
Gołdap	Warmia-Masuria	48	2011
Mycielin	Lubusz	46	2015
Skurpie	Warmia-Masuria	43.7	2015
Płaszewo-Lulemino	Pomerania	41.4	2011
Suwałki	Podlaskie	41	2009
Kisielice I & II	Warmia-Masuria	53.6	
Karwice	West Pomerania	40	2015
Wicko	Pomerania	40	
Jagniątkowo (Lake Ostrowo)	West Pomerania	34.2	
Łukaszów	Lower Silesian	34	2012
Śniatowo	West Pomerania	32	
Kamieńsk	Łódź	31.2	
Karnice I	West Pomerania	29.9	2009
Zagórze	West Pomerania	30	2003
Wojciechowo	Pomerania	28.3	2014
Rajgród	Podlaskie	25.3	2014
Modlikowice	Lower Silesian	24	2012
Puck	Pomerania	22	2007
Cisowo	West Pomerania	18	2001
Lisewo	Pomerania	10.8	2007
Lubawa (Elektrownia Wiatrowa "Rożental")	Warmia-Mazuria	8	2013
Barzowice	West Pomerania	5.1	2001

== Solar ==
Name/location	Voivodeship	Capacity, MWe	Operational
Goldbeck Solar		204	2022
Przykona		200	2023

== See also ==
- Energy in Poland
- List of power stations in Europe
- List of largest power stations in the world
