= Połaniec Power Station =

Power station in Poland

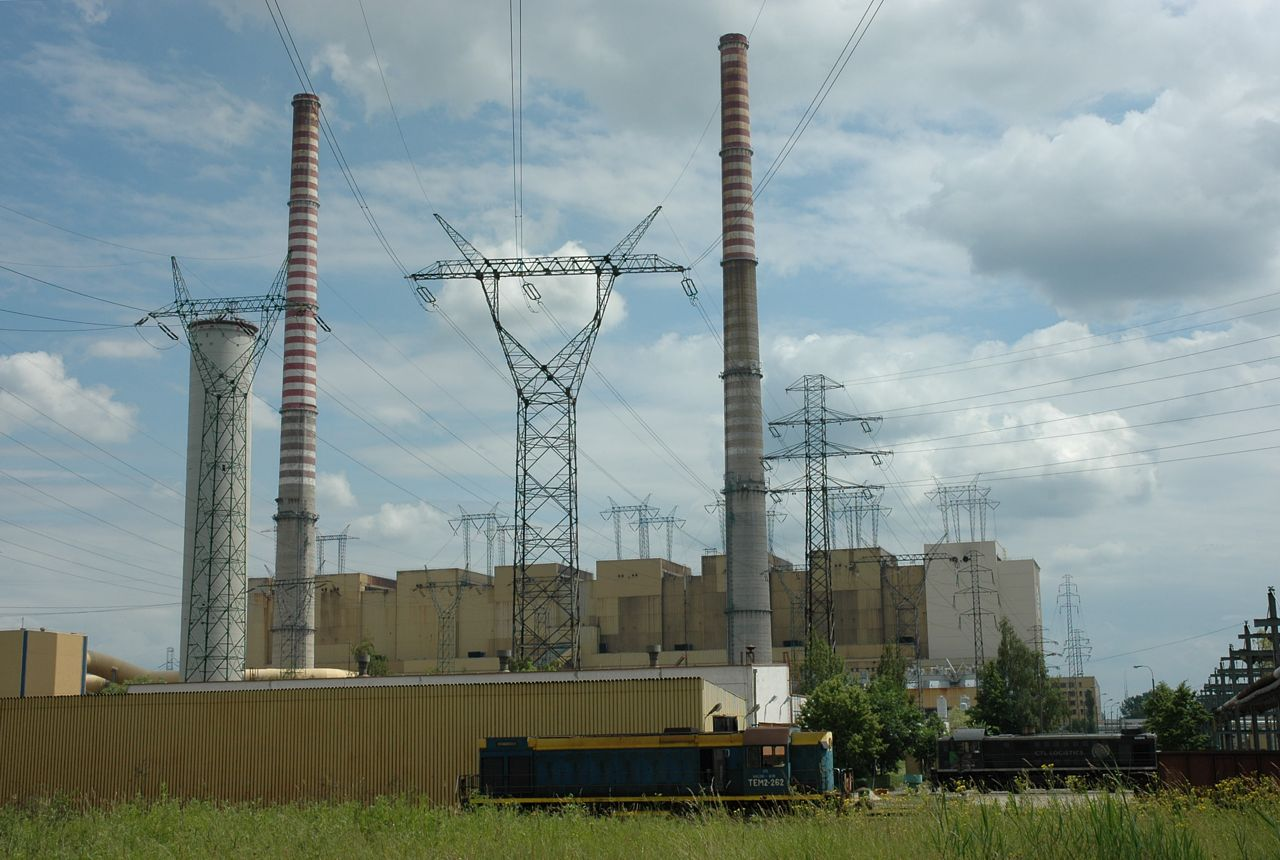
- Official name: Elektrownia Połaniec
- Country: Poland
- Location: Połaniec, Świętokrzyskie Voivodeship
- Coordinates: 50°26′14.51″N 21°20′13.57″E
- Status: Operational
- Commission date: 1979
- Owner: Electrabel
- Operator: Electrabel Polaniec SA

Thermal power station
- Primary fuel: Coal

Power generation
- Units operational: 8 x 225 MW
- Make and model: TAGMET; Zamech; Dolmel; Electrosila
- Nameplate capacity: 1,800 MW

External links
- Website: www.enea.pl/pl/enea-polaniec
- Commons: Related media on Commons

Połaniec Power Station is a coal-fired and biomass power station near Połaniec in Świętokrzyskie Voivodeship, Poland. It consists of 8 units each with a generation capacity of 225 MW. The power station went into service between 1979 and 1983. Originally these units had a generation capacity of 200 MW, but after turbine modernization between 1992 and 1995, it grew up to its actual value.

Following a 1 billion PLN (US$290 million) investment, in November 2012 a biomass power plant became operational at the site of the existing power station. The resulting biomass unit is one of the largest biomass power plants in the world.

== Features ==
The power station has two flue gas stacks, which also carry telecommunication antennas and which are both 250 metres (820 ft) tall. An interesting feature of the facility is that the outgoing powerlines cross the building of the power station on rooftop pylons.

The biomass section is 80% fuelled by wood chips and 20% by agricultural waste. Wood chips are produced from wood waste at the fuel yard, while the agricultural wastes are supplied from within 100 km radius of the plant.

From the eight 225MWe turbines, the biomass unit produces 205MW.

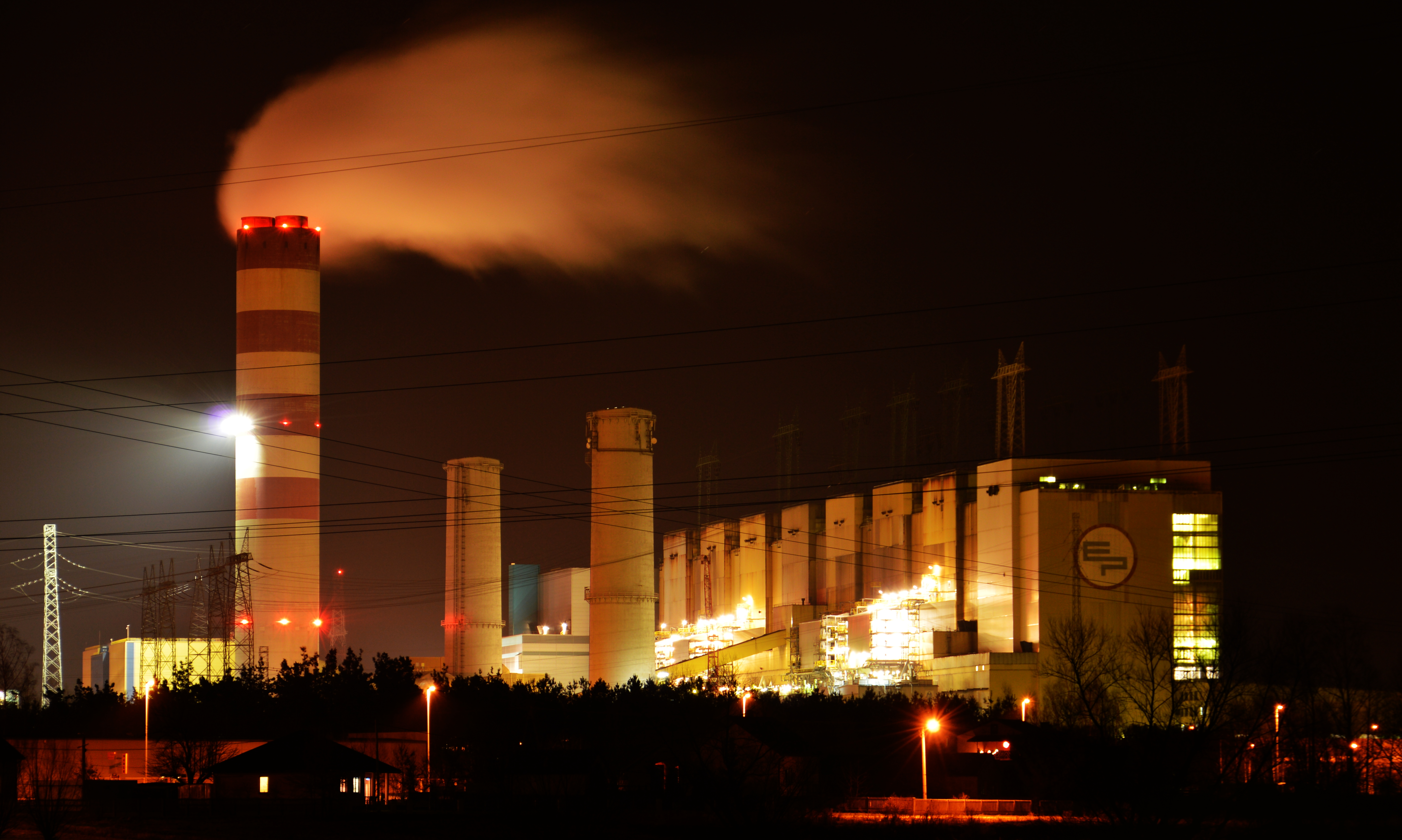
Połaniec Power Station at night

== See also ==
- Bełchatów Power Station
- Katowice Power Station
- Jaworzno Power Station
- Kozienice Power Station
- Łaziska Power Station
- List of tallest structures in Poland
- List of power stations in Poland
