= Kozienice Power Station =

Coal-fired power station in Poland

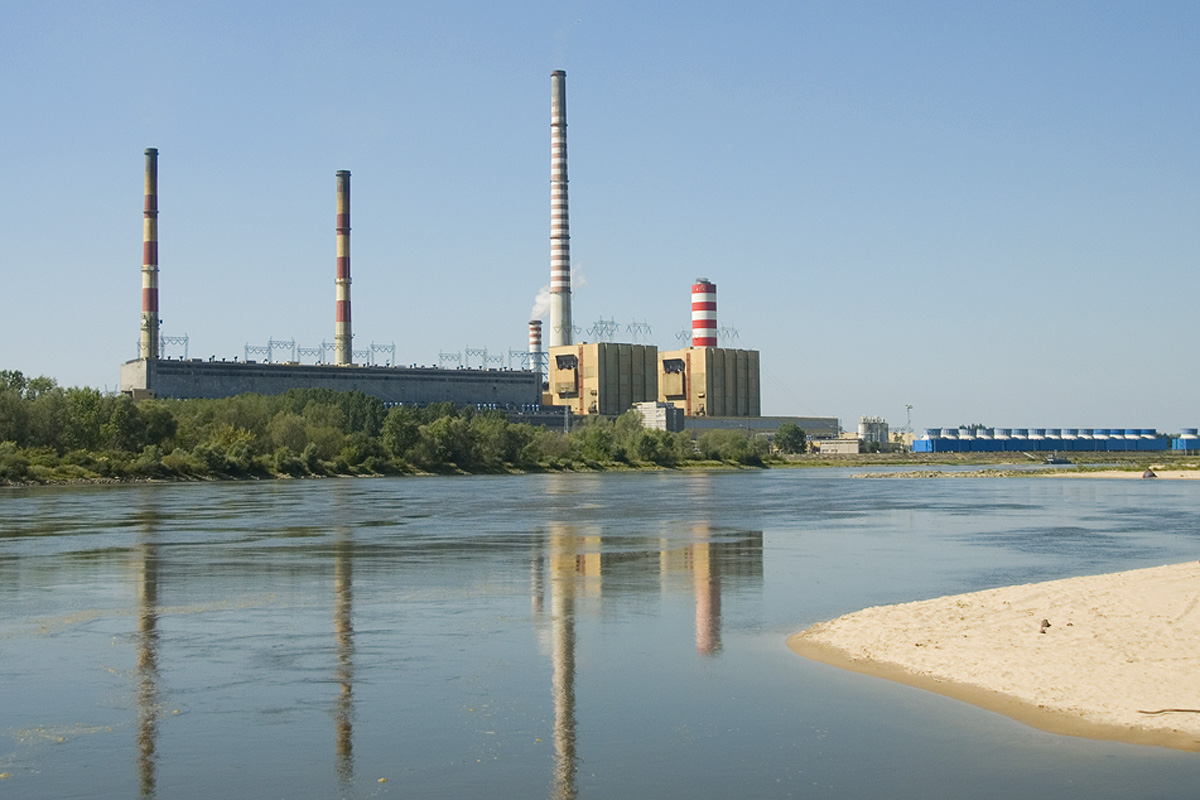
- Official name: Elektrownia Kozienice
- Country: Poland
- Location: Świerże Górne
- Coordinates: 51°40′N 21°28′E
- Status: Operational
- Commission date: 1973
- Owner: Grupa Energetyczna Enea SA
- Operator: Elektrownia Kozienice SA

Thermal power station
- Primary fuel: Anthracite
- Secondary fuel: Biomass

Power generation
- Units operational: 8 x 215 MW; 2 x 500 MW; 1 x 1,075 MW
- Make and model: Rafako; Deutsche Babcock; Zamech; LMZ; Dolmel; Electrosila
- Nameplate capacity: 4,016 MW
- Annual net output: 11,000 GWh

External links
- Website: www.elko.com.pl/elkoweb/site2/site.php?id_lang=1
- Commons: Related media on Commons

The Kozienice Power Station is a coal-fired thermal power station in Świerże Górne near Kozienice, Poland. It is Poland's second largest power station with an installed capacity of 4,016 MW.

The power station has one 300-metre (980 ft) high flue gas stack, which is one of Poland's tallest free standing structures, and two 200-metre (660 ft) high flue gas stacks. A further remarkable feature of it is that the powerlines running away from its switchyard are built as a roofstand on the top of the power station building. On 4 December 2013 four workers died in a fall, as a result of a platform failure within one of the chimneys.

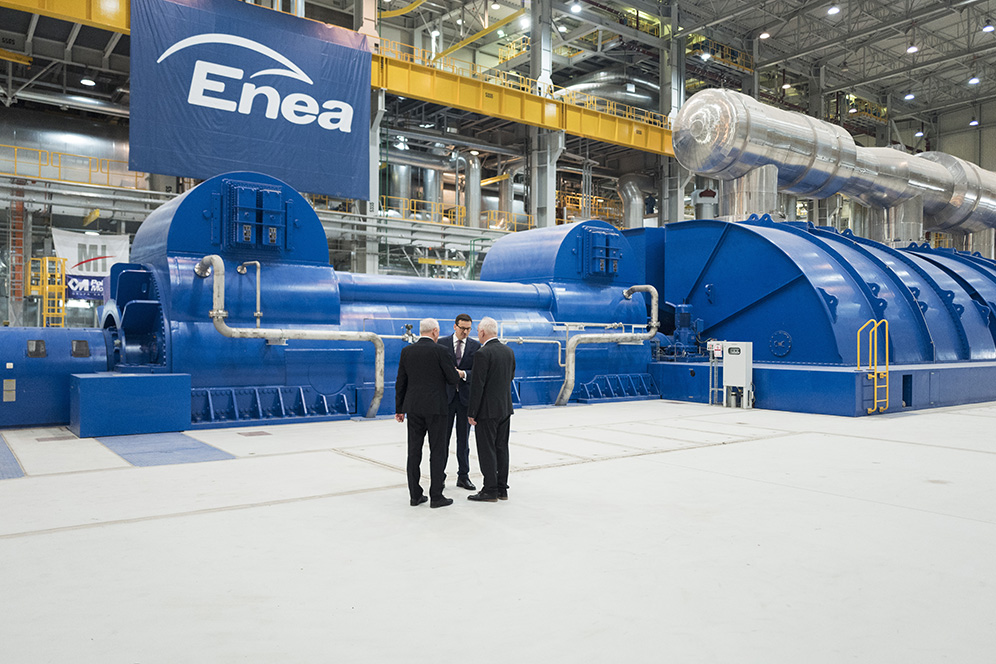
Prime Minister Mateusz Morawiecki during a visit at the Kozienice Power Plant in 2017

== See also ==
- Bełchatów Power Station
- Jaworzno Power Station
- Połaniec Power Station
- Łaziska Power Station
- Katowice Power Station
- List of towers
- List of power stations in Poland
