= Kozienice =

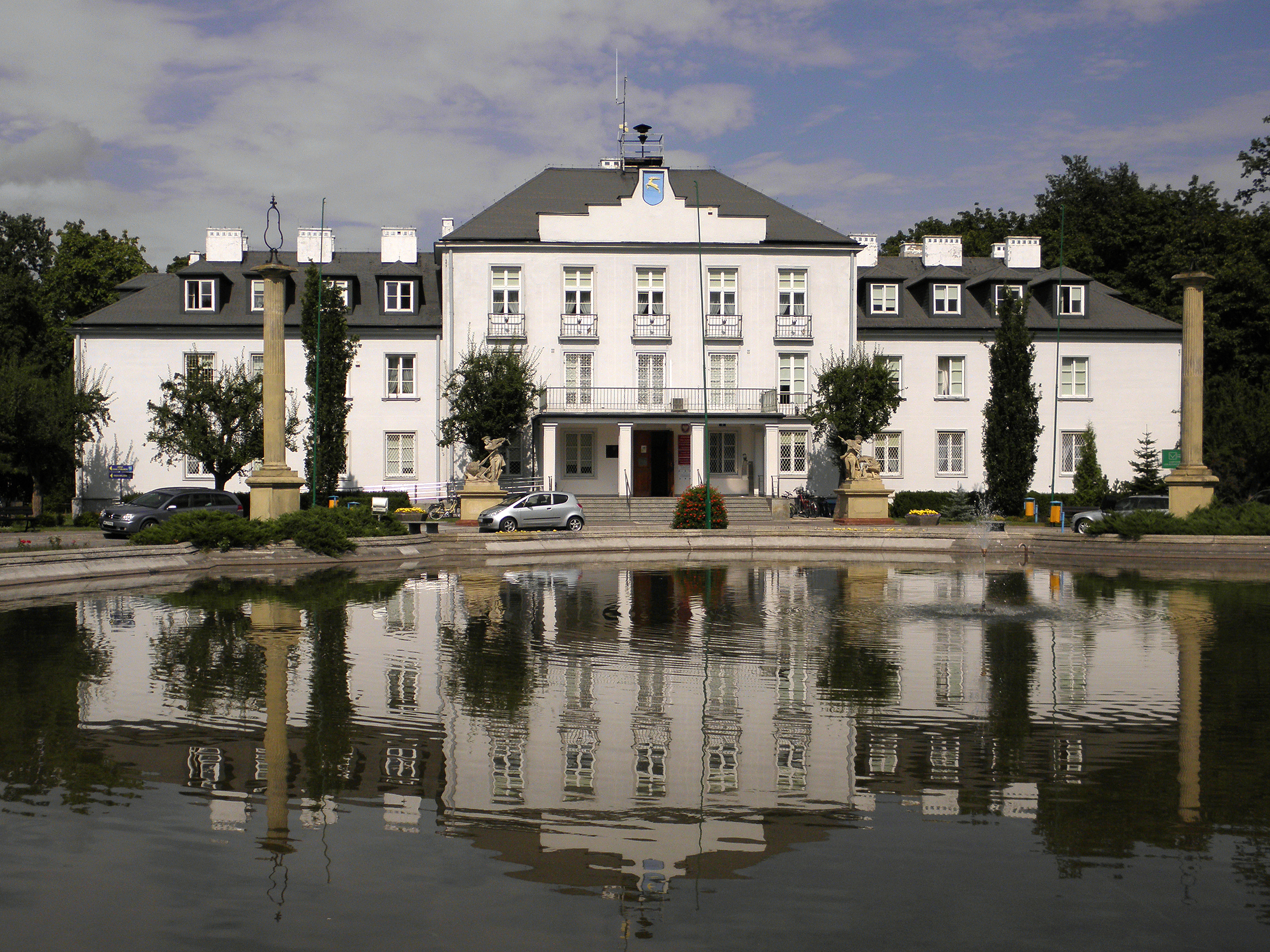
- Palace in Kozienice

- Flag Coat of arms

- Location within Poland
- Coordinates: 51°35′N 21°34′E
- Country: Poland
- Voivodeship: Masovian
- County: Kozienice
- Gmina: Kozienice
- First mentioned: 1206
- Town rights: 1549

Government
  - Mayor: Piotr Kozłowski

Area
  - City: 10.45 km^{2} (4.03 sq mi)

Population (2019)
  - City: 17,075
  - Density: 1,634/km^{2} (4,232/sq mi)
  - Metro: 30,000
- Time zone: UTC+1 (CET)
  - Summer (DST): UTC+2 (CEST)
- Postal code: 26-900
- Area code: +48 48
- Car plates: WKZ
- Website: www.kozienice.pl

Kozienice (Polish pronunciation: [kɔʑɛˈɲit͡sɛ]; Yiddish: קאזשניץ Kozhnits) is a town in eastern Poland with 21,500 inhabitants (1995). Located four miles from the Vistula, it is the capital of Kozienice County.

Even though Kozienice is part of Lesser Poland, it is situated in the Masovian Voivodeship (since 1999); previously, it was in Radom Voivodeship (1975–1998) and in Kielce Voivodeship (1919–1939, 1945–1975). North-west of Kozienice, in Świerże Górne, Poland's second largest coal-fired thermal Kozienice Power Station is located. Kozienice gives its name to the protected area called Kozienice Landscape Park.

== Etymology ==
In records from 1429, the name of the town was spelled in Latin Coszinicze (Kozinice). In 1569 it was called Kozienycze – the name comes from the given name Kozina.

== History ==
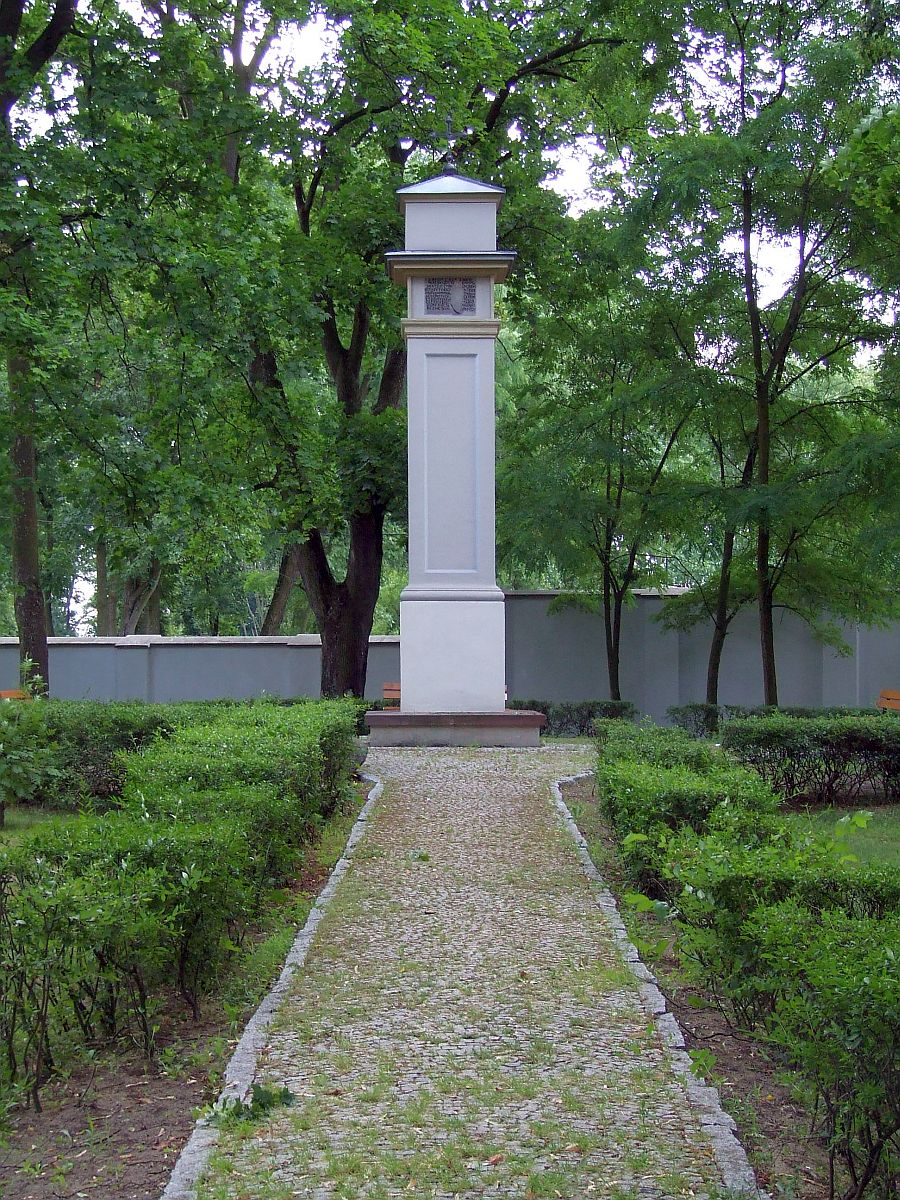
Monument commemorating the birth of Polish King Sigismund I the Old in Kozienice

History of the town dates back to 1206, when – together with neighboring villages, Kozienice was owned by the Norbertine Nuns from Płock. Subsequently, it used to belong to Polish crown, and remained so until the Partitions of Poland. In 1326 Kozienice was incorporated by King Władysław I the Elbow-high. Located on the ancient road from Kraków to Vilnius and on the edge of the Kozienice Forest, the town became one of favorite retreats of King Władysław II Jagiełło, who founded a church there in 1394. Due to close proximity of the Kozienice Forest and, thus the easily accessible wood supply a pontoon bridge was built over the river, which was later moved to Czerwińsk and used by Polish troops to cross the Vistula (Wisła) between June 30 and July 3, 1410 (see Polish–Lithuanian–Teutonic War).

In 1467, future King Sigismund I the Old was born in Kozienice at a manor house, which is marked by a monument, erected in 1518 (the oldest non-religious monument in Poland). Kozienice was incorporated as a city in 1549, by King Sigismund II Augustus. In 1559 the king established three annual fairs in Kozienice. It was a royal town, administratively located in the Radom County in the Sandomierz Voivodeship in the Lesser Poland Province of the Polish Crown. In 1652, the town was decimated by a cholera outbreak, and four years later, during the Deluge, a battle between Poles and Swedes took place there. In 1782 Kozienice burns in a fire, and due to the efforts of King Stanisław August Poniatowski, the town was rebuilt, and wooden buildings were replaced by stone houses. In 1784-1788, a manufacture, producing rifles, was founded in Kozienice. The 2nd Polish National Cavalry Brigade was stationed in Kozienice in 1792.

The town was annexed by Austria in the Third Partition of Poland in 1795. In 1809, Poles led by General Józef Zajączek defeated the Austrians in the Battle of Kozienice, and the town then became part of the short-lived Polish Duchy of Warsaw. After its dissolution in 1815 it fell to the Russian Partition of Poland. In 1867, for the first time in history, Kozienice became the seat of a county. A road to Radom was built, as well as barracks of the Imperial Russian Army. In 1897 it was inhabited by 6,391 people (including 3,764 Jews). In 1918 Poland regained independence and the town was reintegrated with the reborn state.

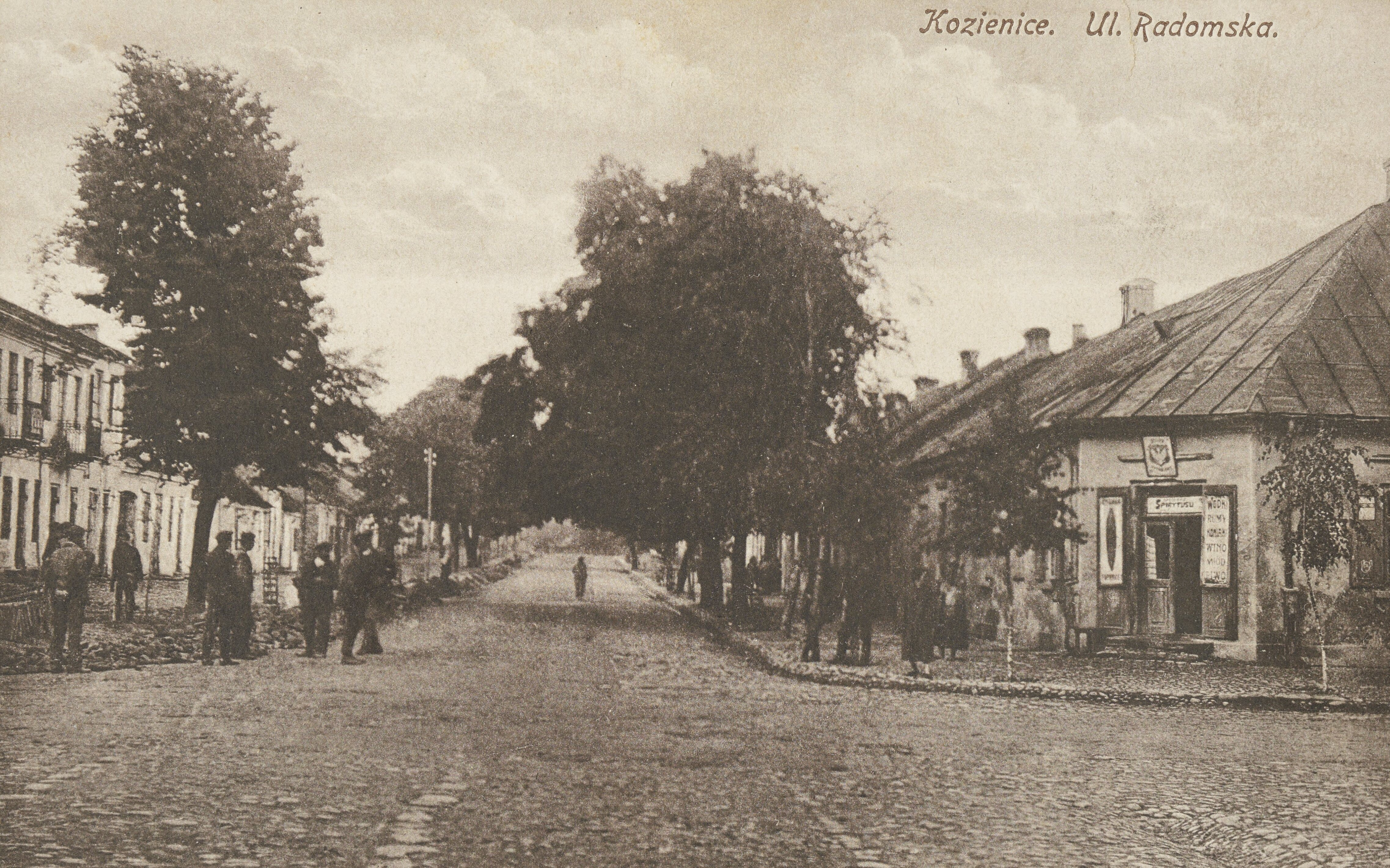
Radomska Street before 1926

After the joint German-Soviet invasion of Poland, which started World War II, the town was occupied by Germany from 1939 to 1945, administratively included in the Radom District of the General Government (German-occupied central Poland). As part of the AB-Aktion, in June 1940, the Germans carried out mass arrests of Poles, who were afterwards imprisoned and tortured in Skarżysko-Kamienna and then murdered in a forest near Skarżysko-Kamienna. The Polish resistance movement was active in the town.

=== Jews in Kozienice ===
Kozienice had a Jewish community with a long history dating back to 1596. Kozienice is pronounced as "Kozhnitz" in Yiddish. In the early 19th century, the Kozhnitzer Magid, Rabbi Yisroel Hopstein was one of the pioneers of Hasidism in Poland. He established the Kozhnitz dynasty. In 1856, there were 2,885 people in Kozienice with 1,961 Jews, and in 1897, there were 6,882 people and 3,700 were Jews. Before World War II, about 15,000 souls lived in this region. The Jewish community lived there for about 400 years. The two main industries there were tourism, with Jewish pilgrims visiting the Maggid's tomb, and shoe manufacturing. Kozienice had approximately 5,000 Jews before World War II.

In the mid-19th the Jewish community of Kozienice was made up of families like the Aidenboim, Borensztein, Cytron, Fiszman, Frydman, Goldsztein, Grossman, Hopstein, Horowicz, Rotenberg, Tenenbaum and Wolbergier families among many others.

During the invasion of Poland in September 1939, the Germans forced 2,000 Jews into a small local church, where many of them died of suffocation. Kozienice had 15 streets. The Germans established a ghetto in the fall of 1940 in an area of only three streets. A Jewish Judenrat council was established by the Germans, but most prominent Jews refused to serve. On September 27, 1942, 8,000 Jews from Kozienice and nearby towns were sent to the Treblinka extermination camp, where they were murdered on arrival. Only 70–120 Jews were then left in the Kozienice ghetto, but they were deported in late December 1942 to the Pionki slave labor camp and to Skarzysko Kamienna camp. Some Jews, however, were able to survive the Holocaust by hiding with the Poles. Several Poles from Kozienice were sentenced to death or deported to the Auschwitz concentration camp for rescuing Jews. After World War II the survivors emigrated and with time created the Memorial Book of Kozienice, with supplementary List of Martyrs from Kozienice which includes residents of Kozienice killed in Kozienice itself as well as those deported to death camps where they were gassed.

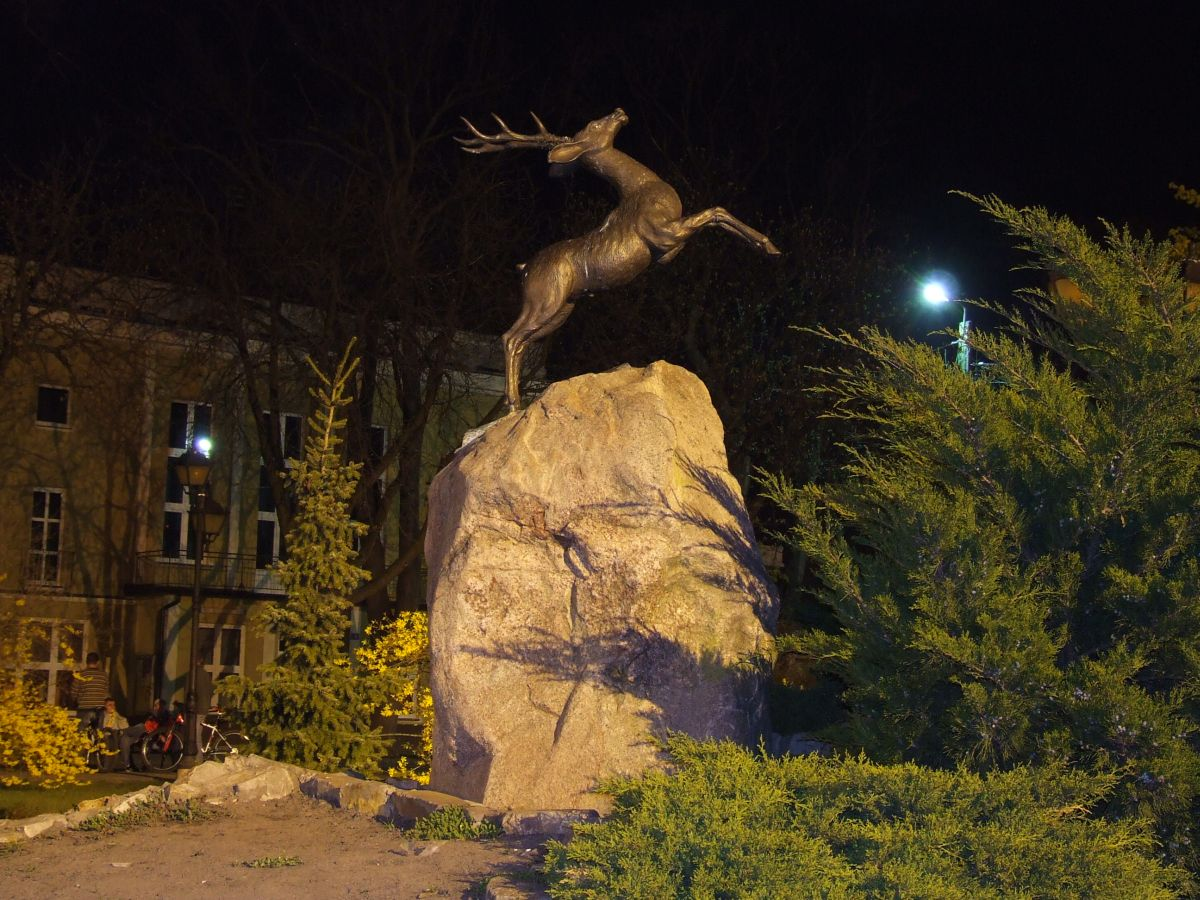
Monument of a deer, the symbol of the town, contained in its coat of arms

== Notable people ==
- Rabbi Yisroel Hopstein (1737–1814) a Polish Rabbi from the third generation of Chassidus, author of "Avodas Yisroel", commonly known as the "Koznitzer Maggid"
- Frans Krajcberg (1921–2017) a Polish Brazilian painter, sculptor, engraver and photographer.
- Edmund Lesisz (1906-1943) a Polish Captain, a leader of the Raid on Fraustadt in 1939
- Julia Michalska (born 1985) a Polish rower and team bronze medallist at the 2008 Summer Olympics
- Irene Gut Opdyke (1922–2003) a Polish nurse, aided Polish Jews persecuted by Nazi Germany during WWII.
- Sigismund I the Old (1467–1548) King of Poland and Grand Duke of Lithuania from 1506-1548.

== Climate ==
Kozienice has an oceanic climate (Köppen climate classification: Cfb) using the −3 °C (27 °F) isotherm or a humid continental climate (Köppen climate classification: Dfb) using the 0 °C (32 °F) isotherm.

Climate data for Kozienice (1991–2020 normals, extremes 1977–present)
Month	Jan	Feb	Mar	Apr	May	Jun	Jul	Aug	Sep	Oct	Nov	Dec	Year
Record high °C (°F)	15.3 (59.5)	18.0 (64.4)	22.3 (72.1)	30.9 (87.6)	32.8 (91.0)	34.9 (94.8)	36.9 (98.4)	37.3 (99.1)	35.0 (95.0)	25.5 (77.9)	19.5 (67.1)	14.5 (58.1)	37.3 (99.1)
Mean daily maximum °C (°F)	1.1 (34.0)	2.8 (37.0)	7.7 (45.9)	14.8 (58.6)	20.1 (68.2)	23.5 (74.3)	25.6 (78.1)	25.2 (77.4)	19.5 (67.1)	13.3 (55.9)	6.9 (44.4)	2.3 (36.1)	13.6 (56.5)
Daily mean °C (°F)	−1.6 (29.1)	−0.6 (30.9)	3.1 (37.6)	8.8 (47.8)	13.9 (57.0)	17.4 (63.3)	19.4 (66.9)	18.7 (65.7)	13.6 (56.5)	8.5 (47.3)	3.7 (38.7)	−0.2 (31.6)	8.7 (47.7)
Mean daily minimum °C (°F)	−4.4 (24.1)	−3.7 (25.3)	−1.1 (30.0)	3.0 (37.4)	7.6 (45.7)	11.3 (52.3)	13.3 (55.9)	12.6 (54.7)	8.5 (47.3)	4.4 (39.9)	0.9 (33.6)	−2.8 (27.0)	4.1 (39.4)
Record low °C (°F)	−32.8 (−27.0)	−26.8 (−16.2)	−23.7 (−10.7)	−9.3 (15.3)	−4.8 (23.4)	−0.5 (31.1)	4.8 (40.6)	2.6 (36.7)	−2.5 (27.5)	−9.1 (15.6)	−21.0 (−5.8)	−24.3 (−11.7)	−32.8 (−27.0)
Average precipitation mm (inches)	30.1 (1.19)	29.2 (1.15)	34.4 (1.35)	39.2 (1.54)	63.2 (2.49)	64.9 (2.56)	85.6 (3.37)	57.6 (2.27)	54.1 (2.13)	42.4 (1.67)	34.8 (1.37)	32.4 (1.28)	568.0 (22.36)
Average extreme snow depth cm (inches)	5.8 (2.3)	6.7 (2.6)	4.4 (1.7)	1.1 (0.4)	0.0 (0.0)	0.0 (0.0)	0.0 (0.0)	0.0 (0.0)	0.0 (0.0)	0.3 (0.1)	3.1 (1.2)	4.2 (1.7)	6.7 (2.6)
Average precipitation days (≥ 0.1 mm)	15.57	13.44	13.17	11.50	12.80	12.87	13.57	10.93	11.40	12.37	13.37	14.97	155.94
Average snowy days (≥ 0 cm)	15.0	14.6	6.6	0.8	0.0	0.0	0.0	0.0	0.0	0.3	3.4	8.7	49.4
Average relative humidity (%)	85.4	82.9	76.5	70.5	72.1	72.6	72.4	73.6	80.3	83.8	87.9	87.4	78.8
Mean monthly sunshine hours	54.1	74.0	134.9	194.5	254.3	265.5	269.4	249.5	174.8	121.1	57.5	40.5	1,890.2
Source 1: Institute of Meteorology and Water Management
Source 2: Meteomodel.pl (records, relative humidity 1991–2020)

== Sport ==
The local football team is MG MZKS Kozienice. It competes in the lower leagues.

== Twin towns – sister cities ==
Kozienice is twinned with:

- Roswell, United States (2023)
- Göllheim, Germany (1996)
- Chuhuiv, Ukraine (2001)
- Medzilaborce, Slovakia (2005)
- Dunavarsány, Hungary (2010)
