= Łaziska Power Station =

Power station in Poland

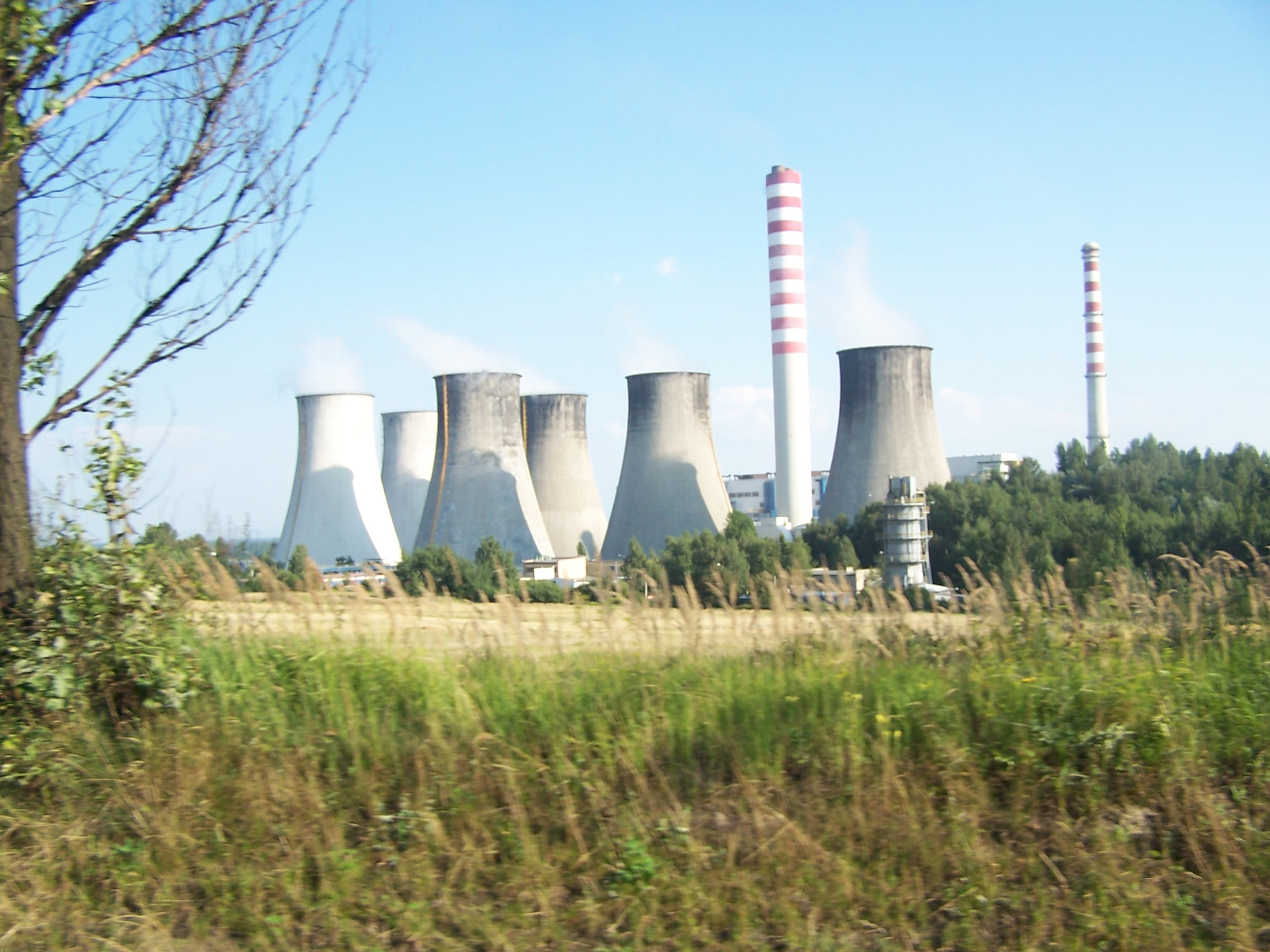
- Official name: Elektrownia Łaziska
- Country: Poland
- Location: Łaziska Górne
- Coordinates: 50°8′1″N 18°50′29″E
- Status: Operational
- Commission date: 1967
- Owner: Tauron Group
- Operator: Tauron Elektrownia Łaziska

Thermal power station
- Primary fuel: Coal

Power generation
- Units operational: 3 x 225 MW; 2 x 125 MW; 1 x 230 MW
- Make and model: Deutsche Babcock; Rafako; Zamech; Dolmel
- Nameplate capacity: 1,155 MW

External links
- Commons: Related media on Commons

Łaziska Power Station (Polish: Elektrownia Łaziska) is a thermal power station in Łaziska Górne, Poland. The first Łaziska Power Station was inaugurated in 1917. In 1929, an 87.1 MW unit was inaugurated making it to the largest power station in Poland at those days.

== Operation ==
The current Łaziska Power Station was built in 1967–1972. It has six units. Three units have capacity of 225 MW, two 125 MW, and one 230 MW. The two flue gas stacks of the station are 200 and 162 metres (656 and 531 ft) tall, a further 200 metres (660 ft) tall flue gas stack was demolished in March 2002 with a special excavator.

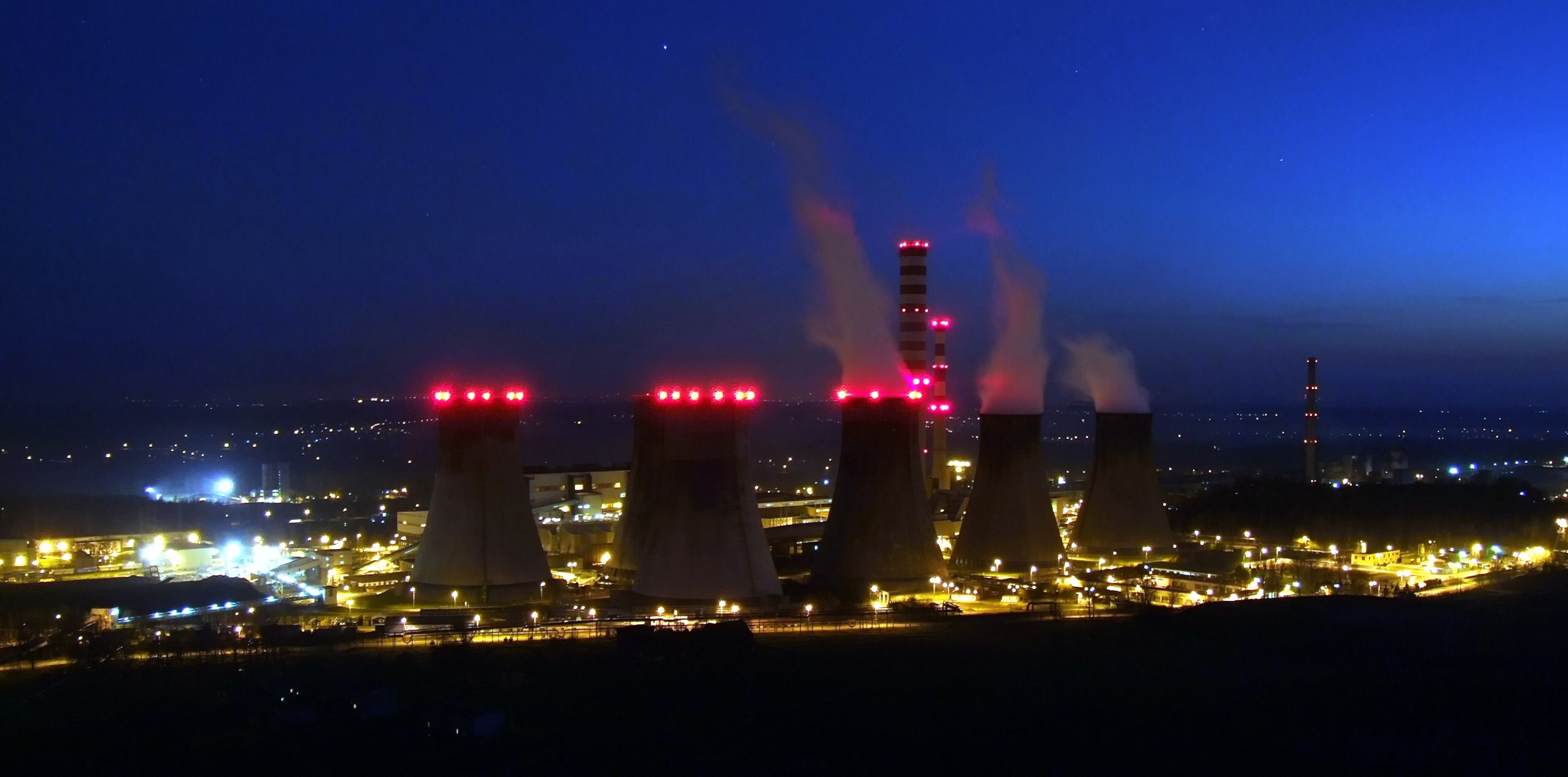
Łaziska Power Station in the night

== See also ==
- Katowice Power Station
- Jaworzno Power Station
- Kozienice Power Station
- Połaniec Power Station
- List of power stations in Poland
