= Edmund Lesisz =

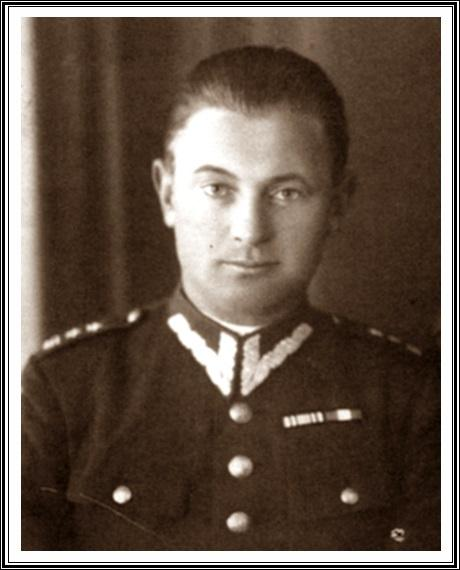
- Born: 1 April 1906; Kozienice, Radom Governorate, Russia
- Died: 21 January 1943 (aged 36); Łódź, General Government, Germany
- Military career
- Allegiance: Poland
- Branch: Polish Armed Forces
- Service years: ??? – 1940
- Rank: Captain
- Conflicts: World War II: Battle of the Border; Raid on Fraustadt

Edmund Lesisz (1906-1943) was a Polish Captain who was known for being one of the main leaders of the Raid on Fraustadt and commanding the 55th Poznań Infantry Regiment during the Invasion of Poland.

== Biography ==
Lesisz was a professional infantry officer, coming from a family with patriotic traditions, and a graduate of the Cadet Corps in Lviv. During the Invasion of Poland, Cpt. Ludwik Snitko, commanding a platoon of heavy machine guns and a platoon of armored cars, organized the Raid on Fraustadt which ended in a Polish victory. He was also a captain of the 55th Infantry Regiment as the commander of the 2nd company in the 1st battalion.

After the conclusion of the Invasion, Capt. Lesisz was captured by the Germans and stayed in Oflag VII-A Murnau. There, in the fall of 1941, he was arrested by the Gestapo for allegedly ordering the deaths of surrendered German soldiers at Fraustadt. A similar fate befell his superior - Maj. Jan Dymowski who was the commander of the 1st Battalion of the 55th Infantry Regiment. Until January 1943 they were both held in a prison in Łódź, where they were to be tried but Lesisz was tortured and brutally murdered the day before the end of the trial on 21 January 1943.

=== Legacy ===
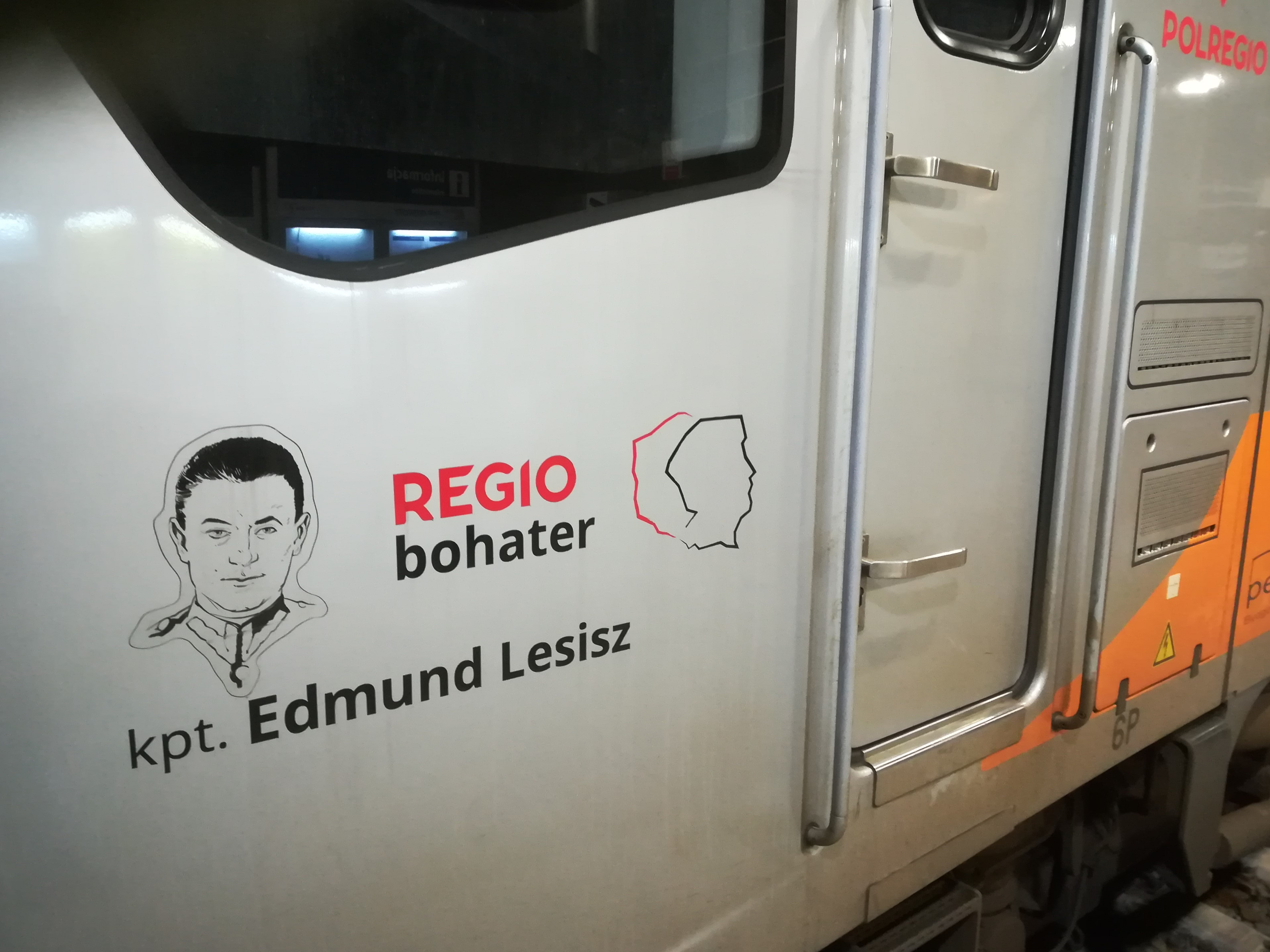
Edmund Lesisz as Regio Bohater on the SA139-023 model of the Polregio

Lesisz was posthumously awarded the Cross of the Order of Virtuti Militari by the Polish government-in-exile during the 1970s. He is also featured in a SA139-023 model as a Regio Bohater as a commemoration for the 100th Anniversary of Poland's independence.
