= Władysław Wiecierzyński =

Polish colonel

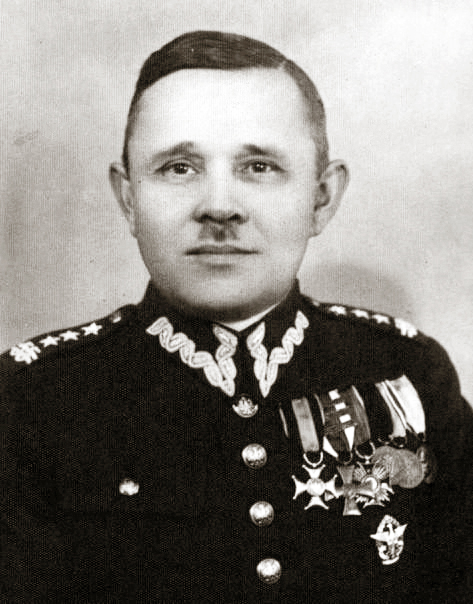
- Born: April 15, 1894; Suwałki, Suwałki Governorate, Russian Empire
- Died: February 22, 1983 (aged 88); Leszno, Leszno Voivodeship, Polish People's Republic
- Military career
- Allegiance: Russian Empire; Poland
- Branch: Imperial Russian Army; Polish Armed Forces
- Service years: 1913 – 1939
- Rank: Infantry colonel
- Commands: 141st Infantry Regiment; 41st Suwałki Infantry Regiment; KOP "Sejny" Battalion; KOP "Snów" Battalion; 56th Greater Poland Infantry Regiment; 55 Poznań Infantry Regiment
- Conflicts: World War I; Polish–Soviet War; World War II; Invasion of Poland; Raid on Fraustadt

Władysław Wiecierzyński (April 15, 1894 – February 22, 1983) was a Polish colonel who was a commander of the Polish Armed Forces and was a knight of the Virtuti Militari.

== Biography ==
Wiecierzyński was the son of Józef who was a shoemaker and Bronisława née Norbert. In the years 1901–1910 he attended primary school and the Private Seven-year School of Economics in Suwałki . In October 1911 he joined the Imperial Russian Army, but was released to the reserve the following year on health grounds. In 1913 he was re-called up to the Russian army and in 1914 he was sent to an officer course in St. Petersburg. In 1915, after graduating from school, he was appointed ensign and was assigned to the 141st Moghis Infantry Regiment fighting in the Russian 36th Infantry Division of the North-Western Front. In 1916 he was promoted to second lieutenant and in the next year, to the rank of lieutenant.

In 1917, after demobilization, he returned to Suwałki and joined the Polish Military Organization. As part of the underground activities, he took part in the disarmament of German patrols in the Suwałki region. In January 1919 he broke through the cordon of German troops to Zambrów and joined the 1st Suwałki Rifle Regiment, later renamed the 41st Suwałki Infantry Regiment. In the regiment, he took command of a machine gun company and fought at Lida, where he was wounded. He was wounded for the second time in August 1920 near Modlin.

On June 1, 1921, as a captain, he continued to serve in the 41st Infantry Regiment. On May 3, 1922, he was verified with the rank of major with seniority on June 1, 1919, and the 518th position in the corps of infantry officers, and his parent unit was still the 41st infantry regiment. On July 22, 1922, he was approved as a battalion commander in the 41st infantry regiment. In 1923 he was the commander of the 3rd battalion of the 41st Infantry Regiment. In 1924, he was on a temporary position, on a course for junior infantry officers in Chełmno, remaining a full-time officer in the 41st Infantry Regiment.

On March 11, 1926, his transfer to the Border Protection Corps to the position of the commander of the KOP "Sejny" Battalion. On January 23, 1928, he was promoted to senior lieutenant colonel on January 1, 1928, and ranked 69th in the corps of infantry officers. In the summer of 1929 he was transferred to the position of the commander of the KOP "Snów" Battalion.

On January 28, 1931, it was announced that he was transferred from the KOP to the 56th Greater Poland Infantry Regiment in Krotoszyn to the position of deputy regiment commander. In November 1935 he took command of the 55th Poznań Infantry Regiment in Leszno. On March 19, 1939, he was promoted to colonel in the corps of infantry officers.

He fought at the head of a regiment in the Invasion of Poland of 1939. After losing the ability to command the regiment as a result of heavy losses and enemy bombings, on September 17, 1939, he broke through Budy Stare-Kamion-Łaźnia to the Kampinos Forest. He was captured by the Germans near Modlin. During World War II he was in Oflag XVIII A in Linz, and from the beginning of 1941 in Oflag II-C in Woldenberg, No. 20669 / XVIII A.

=== Later years ===
After returning from captivity, he resigned from the army. He was recognized by the Inwalid Medical Commission in Leszno due to "his wound in 1939 and a German heart disease acquired in captivity", he was a war invalid in 70 percent. On April 25, 1945, he started working as an invalid at the "Antoniny" Seed Breeding Station in Leszno . In 1950, together with his subordinates, he founded the "Bzura" Cooperative of the Disabled in Leszno, later renamed "Kopernik". He worked there as an accountant from 1953 to 1967, when he was retired. He died on February 22, 1983, in Leszno . He was buried in Leszno at the parish cemetery at Kąkolewska Street.

Colonel Władysław Wiecierzyński was commemorated in Leszno with a plaque on the house where he lived. On January 24, 1991, by resolution No. XI / 52/91, one of the streets in Leszno was named “Płk. Władysław Wiecierzyński ”.

=== Family ===
On January 27, 1923, Wiecierzyński married Jadwiga Monika Mackiewicz, daughter of Wiktor and Bogumiła, born on December 24, 1901, in Suwałki. His wife graduated from the SGH Warsaw School of Economics. On August 18, 1939, she and her sons were evacuated to the vicinity of Lviv. During the war, she was imprisoned in the Ravensbrück concentration camp. Władysław and Jadwiga had two sons: Władysław (born on April 8, 1924) and Ryszard (born on September 17, 1928). Both sons were prisoners of the Stutthof and Ravensbrück concentration camps.

== Awards ==
- Virtuti Militari, Gold Cross (No. 139 from 1946 / MON 1972)
- Virtuti Militari, Silver Cross (No. 1179 of 1920)
- Cross of Valour (Awarded four times, No. 34483)
- Cross of Merit, Gold Cross (No. 3897 in 1928, second awarded in 1938)
- Cross of Independence (1932)
- Medal for Long Service, Silver and Bronze
- Medal "For participation in the defensive war of 1939"
- Badge "Meritorious Activist of the National Unity Front"
- Memorial Badge of the 55th Infantry Regiment
