= Katowice Power Station =

Coal-fired power station in Katowice, Poland

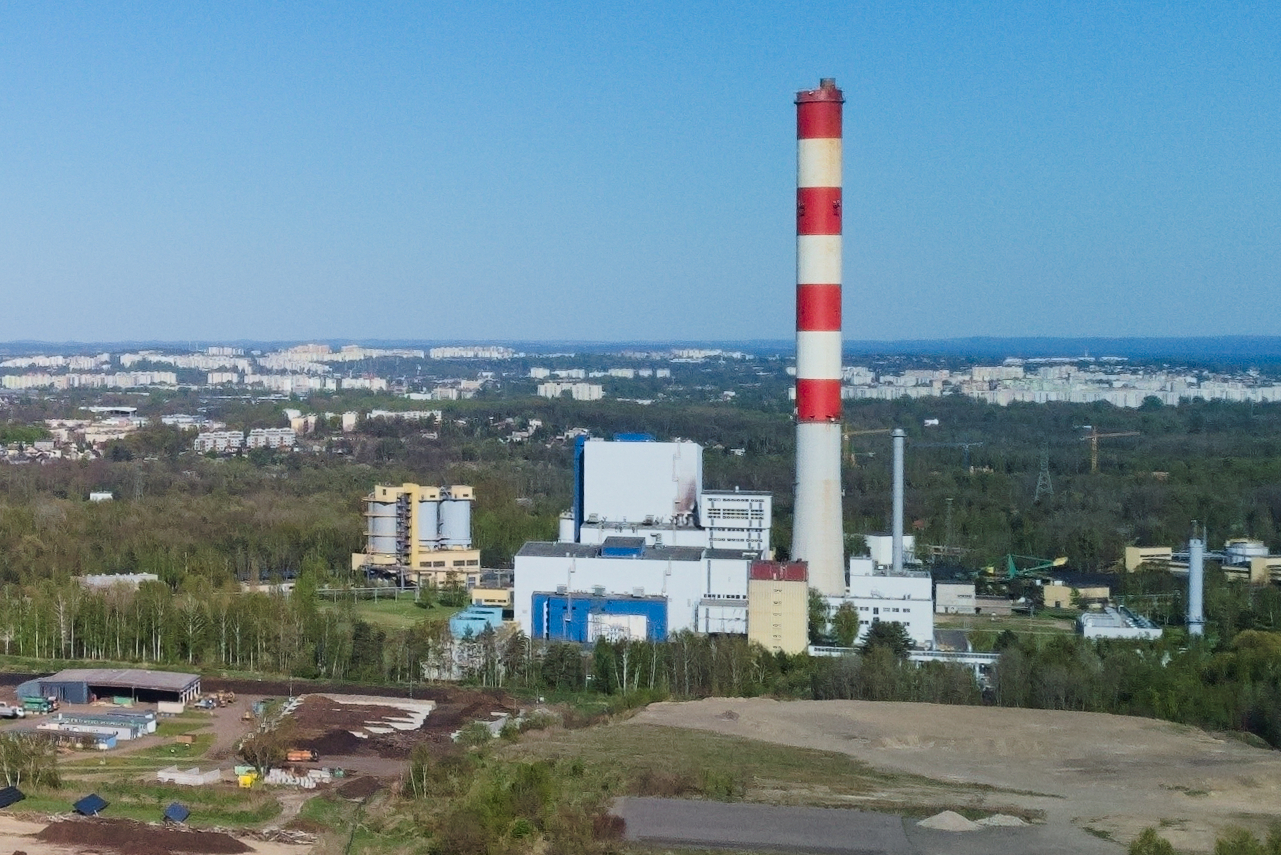
- Official name: Elektrociepłownia Katowice
- Country: Poland
- Location: Katowice
- Coordinates: 50°17′08.13″N 19°3′14.07″E
- Status: Operational
- Commission date: 1985
- Owner: PKE
- Operator

Thermal power station
- Primary fuel: Coal
- Secondary fuel: Oil
- Tertiary fuel: Natural gas
- Cogeneration?: Yes
- Thermal capacity: 2 × 144 MWt; 1 × 233 MWt

Power generation
- Units operational: 1 × 135.5 MWe
- Make and model: BCF-100
- Nameplate capacity: 135.5 MW

External links
- Website: www.pke.pl/elektrownie/pke-sa-elektrocieplownia-katowice
- Commons: Related media on Commons

Katowice Power Station (Polish: Elektrociepłownia Katowice) is a coal-fired power station in Katowice, Poland. It consists of four units. Two units each with a generation capacity of 144 MWt went in service respectively in 1985, and a third unit of 233 MWt in 1991. In 2000 a new unit of BCF-100 type with a heat capacity of 200 MW and electric generation capacity of 135.5 MW was added. The plant has a heating capacity of 200 MWt.

The flue gas stack of the power station is 200 metres (660 ft) tall and equipped with several antennas.

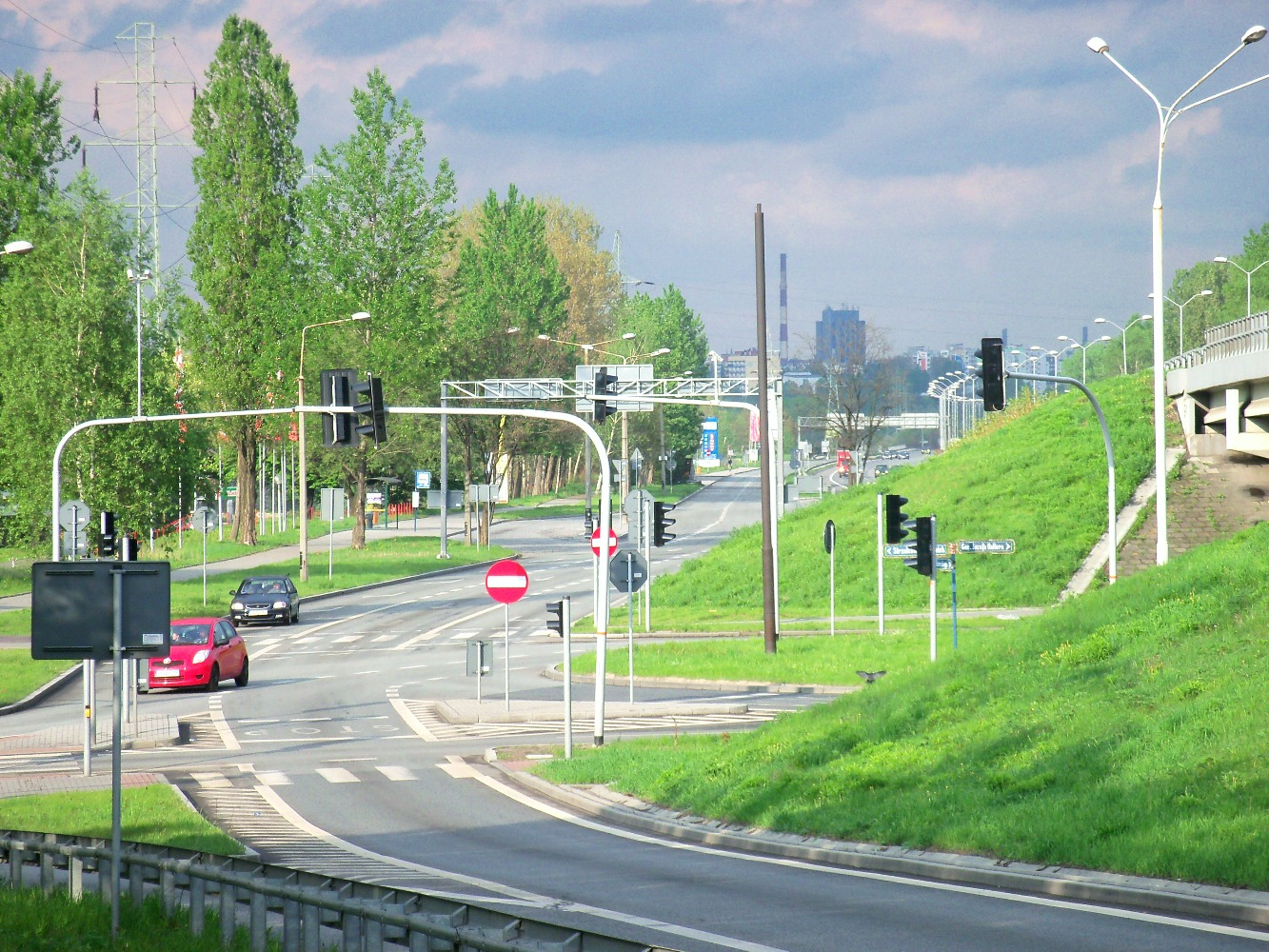
Distant view of Katowice Power Station as seen from Hallera and Roździeńskiego junction

== See also ==
- Bełchatów Power Station
- Jaworzno Power Station
- Kozienice Power Station
- Połaniec Power Station
- Łaziska Power Station
