= Dębowa Łęka =

- Village
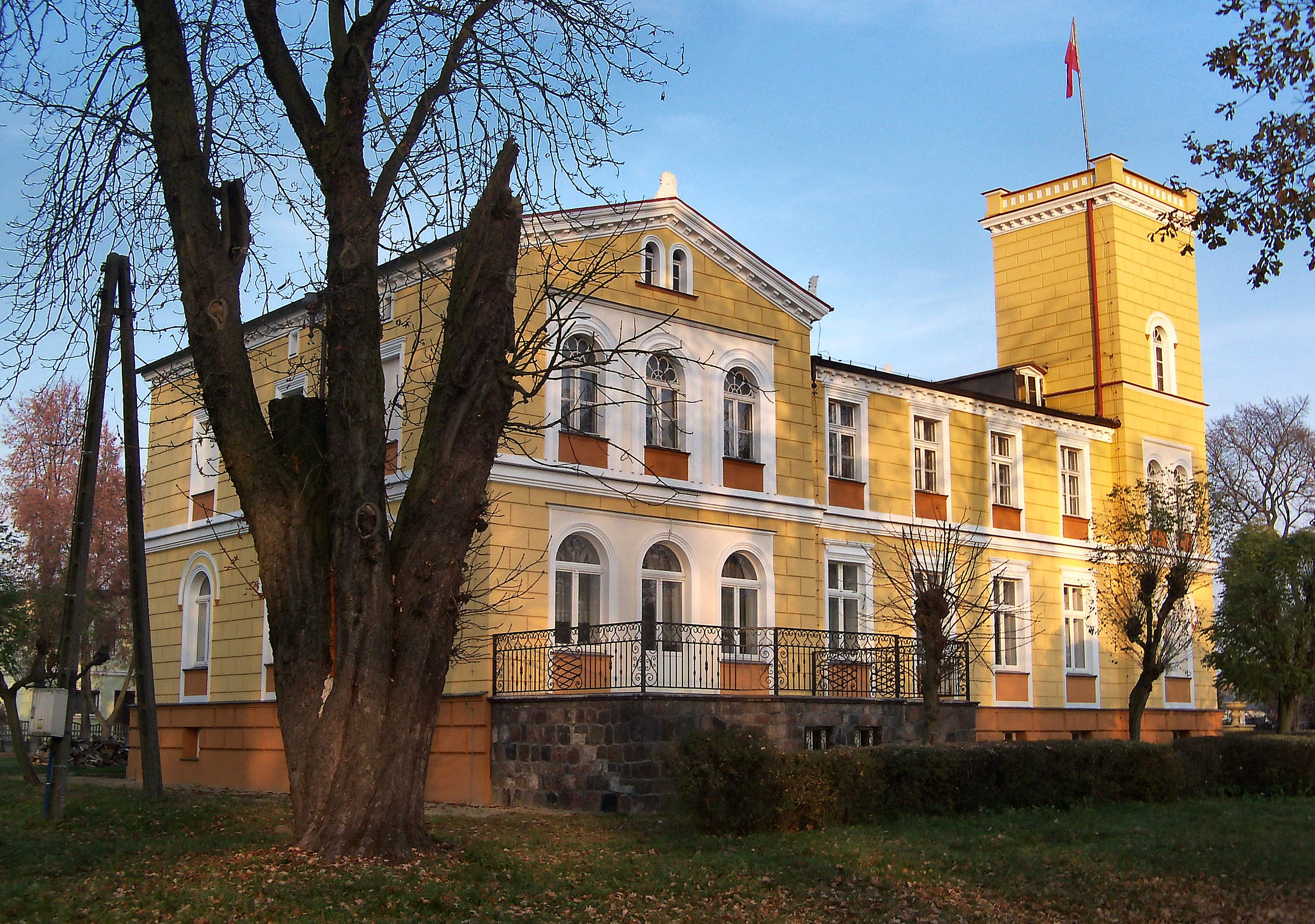
- Brodowski Palace in Dębowa Łęka

- Location within Poland
- Coordinates: 51°49′N 16°23′E
- Country: Poland
- Voivodeship: Lubusz
- County: Wschowa
- Gmina: Wschowa
- Time zone: UTC+1 (CET)
  - Summer (DST): UTC+2 (CEST)
- Vehicle registration: FWS
- Climate: Dfb

Dębowa Łęka ([dɛmˈbɔva ˈwɛnka]) is a village in the administrative district of Gmina Wschowa, within Wschowa County, Lubusz Voivodeship, in western Poland. It is part of the historic region of Greater Poland.

== History ==
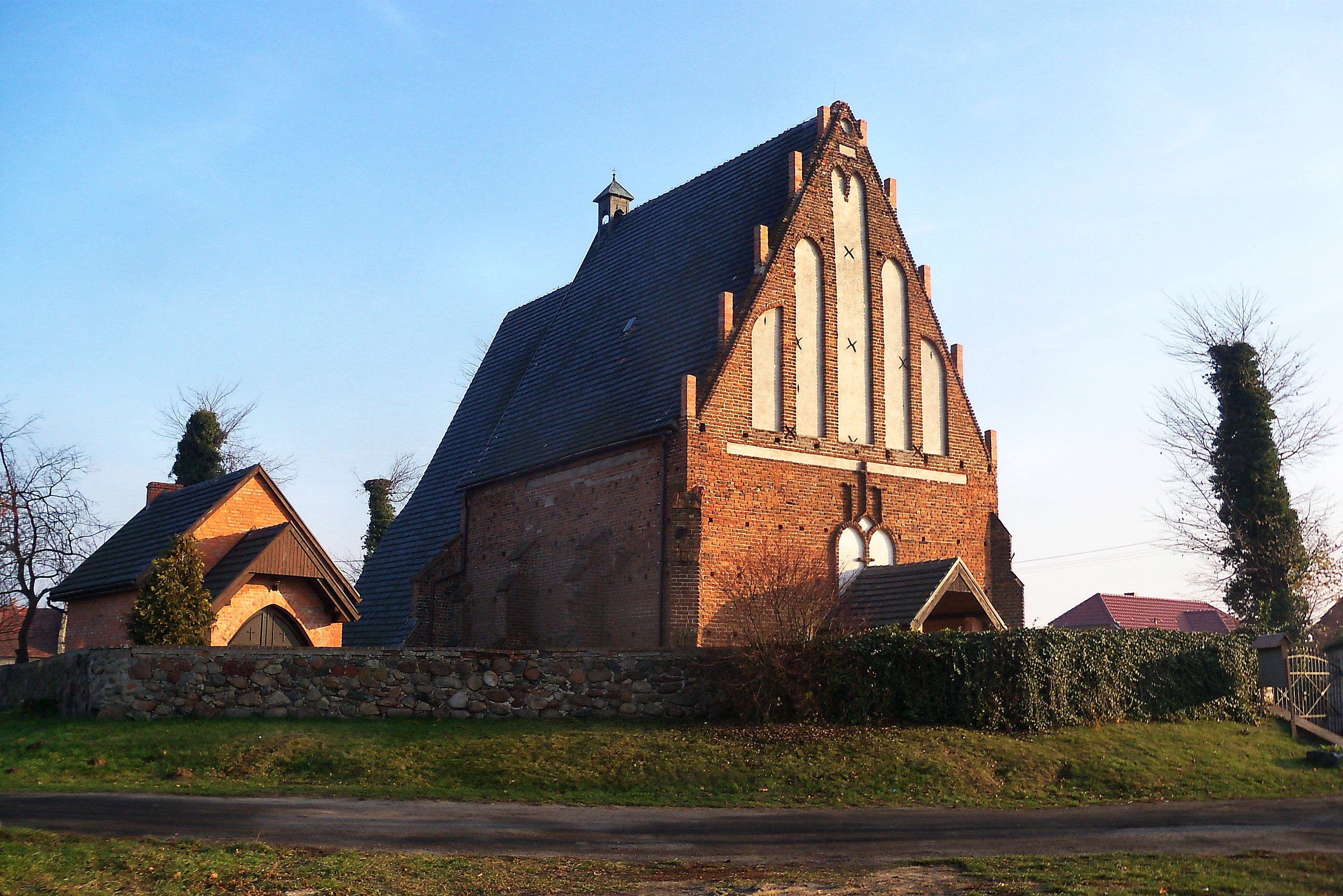
Gothic church

Dębowa Łęka was a private village of Polish nobility, administratively located in the Wschowa County in the Poznań Voivodeship in the Greater Poland Province of the Kingdom of Poland. It was the seat of the Dębołęcki family of Prawdzic coat of arms. In the 16th century it passed to the Ossowski family.

It was annexed by Prussia in the Second Partition of Poland in 1793. Following the successful Greater Poland uprising of 1806, it was regained by Poles and included within the short-lived Duchy of Warsaw, and after the duchy's dissolution it was re-annexed by Prussia in 1815, officially under the Germanized name Geyersdorf. From 1871 it was also part of Germany. During World War II, it was the first settlement of pre-war Germany to be occupied by enemy forces, in conjunction with the Raid on Fraustadt (Wschowa) on 2 September 1939; Polish forces withdrew a few days later after the situation became untenable. After Germany's defeat in the war, in 1945, the village became again part of Poland and its historic name Dębowa Łęka was restored.

== Sights ==
Landmarks of Dębowa Łęka are the Gothic Saint Jadwiga church and the Brodowski Palace.
