= Jaworzno Power Station =

Power station in Poland

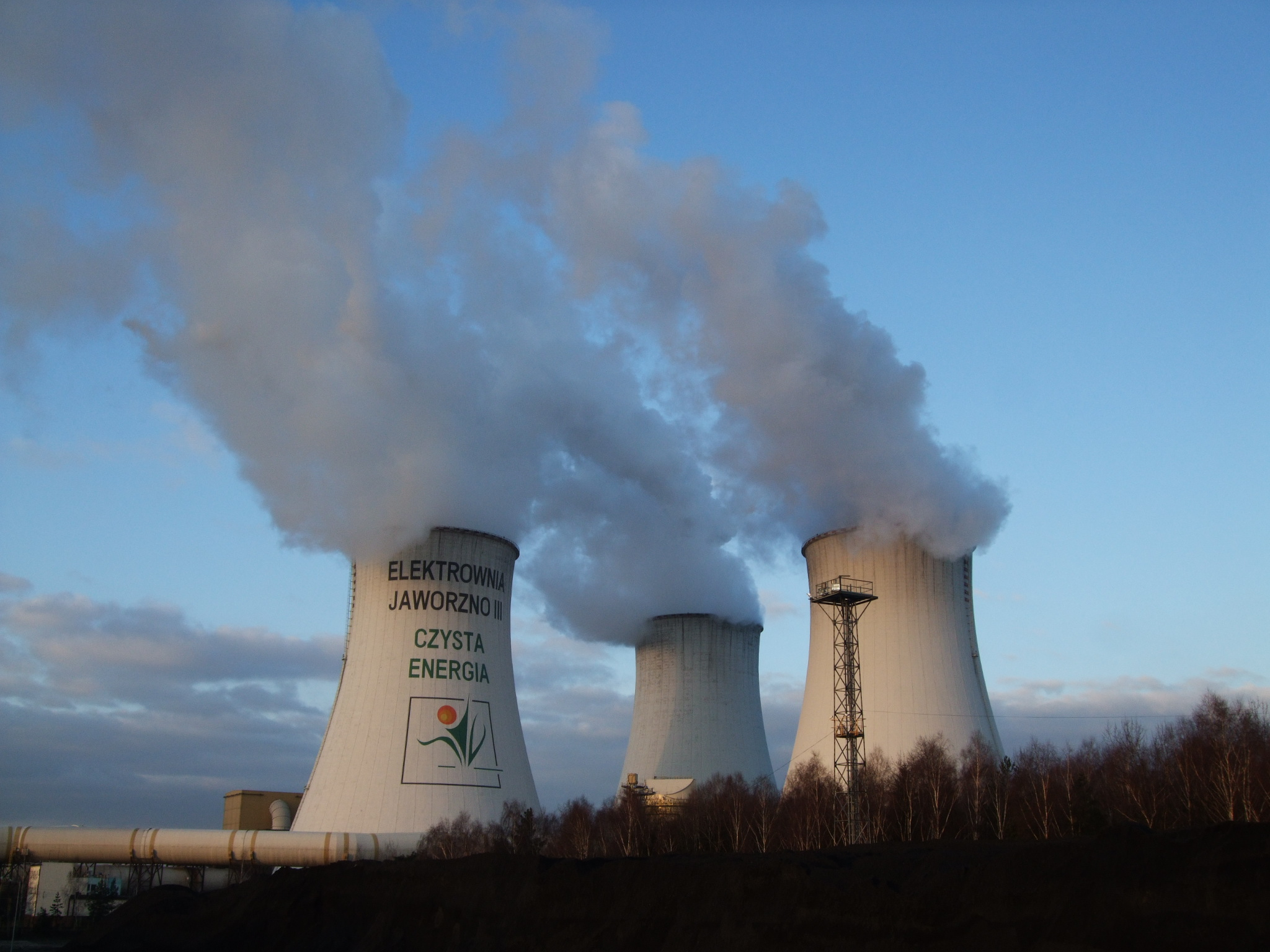
- The Jaworzno III Power Station
- Official name: Elektrownia Jaworzno I-II-III
- Country: Poland
- Location: Jaworzno
- Coordinates: 50.20827°N 19.20490°E
- Status: Operational
- Commission date: 1898 (Jaworzno Power Station I); 1953 (Jaworzno Power Station II); 1976 (Jaworzno Power Station III)
- Decommission date: 1998 (Jaworzno Power Station I)
- Owner: PKE
- Operator: PKE Elektrownia Jaworzno III

Thermal power station
- Primary fuel: Coal
- Cooling towers: 6
- Cogeneration?: Yes

Power generation
- Units operational: Jaworzno Power Station II: 1 x 60 MW; 2 x 70 MW; Jaworzno Power Station III: 5 x 225 MW; 1 x 220 MW
- Make and model: Rafako; Zamech; ZiO-Podolsk; Dolmel; Electrosila
- Units decommissioned: Jaworzno Power Station I: 320 kW
- Nameplate capacity: 1,545 MW

External links
- Website: www.pl.ej3.pkesa.com/en/index.htm
- Commons: Related media on Commons

The Jaworzno Power Station is a complex of coal-fired thermal power stations at Jaworzno, Poland.

The largest plant of the Jaworzno power plant complex is called Jaworzno III. It has an installed electrical generating capacity of 1,345 MW, as well as thermal heating capacity of 321 MWt. About 1 kilometre (0.62 miles) to the east is Jaworzno II, with an installed electrical generating capacity of 200 MW.

== History ==
The beginnings of the plant go back to 1898, when the first two generators were installed with the capacity of 320 kW for the purpose of lighting the neighbouring coal mines and houses. In 1959, after modernization the power station's capacity reached 157 MW.

Is 1940s, the construction of the Jaworzno II Power Station started and in 1953 the first two generating units became operational. In 1956, the Jaworzno Power Station II reached the capacity of 300 MW. The two power stations were merged into a single company in 1972.

Construction of the Jaworzno III Power Station started in 1972 and the generating units were commissioned in 1976–1979. In 1995, all three stations were combined into a state-owned company called Elektrownia Jaworzno III. The first power station was decommissioned in 1998. In 2000, the Elektrownia Jaworzno III became part of PKE SA.

== The Jaworzno III Plant ==
Jaworzno III has a 306-metre (1,004 ft) high flue gas stack which is one of Poland's tallest free standing structures.

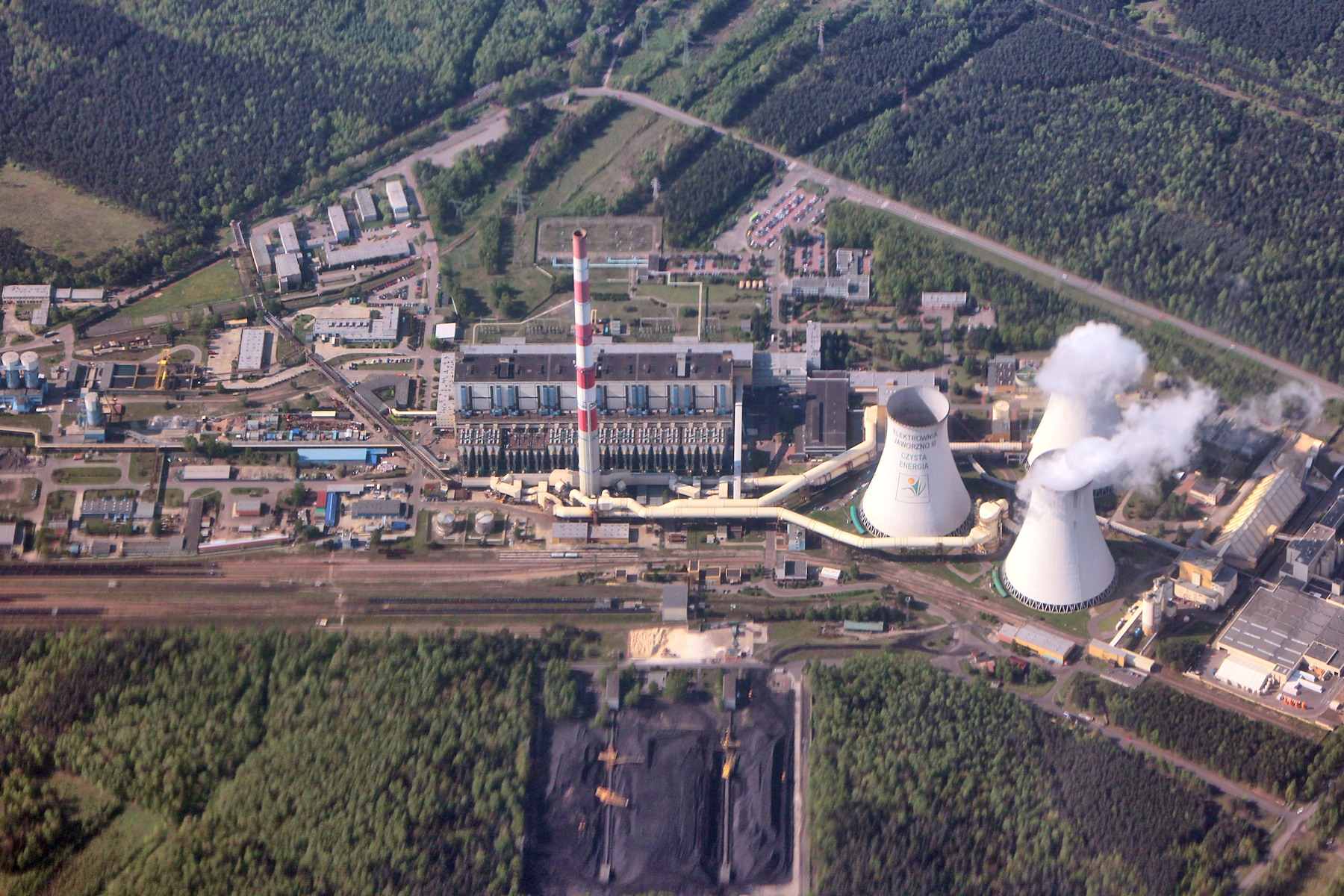
Aerial view of the Jaworzno Power Station

== See also ==
- List of power stations in Poland
- Katowice Power Station
- Kozienice Power Station
- Połaniec Power Station
- Łaziska Power Station
- List of towers
