= Łagisza Power Station =

Thermal power station at Łagisza in Będzin, Poland

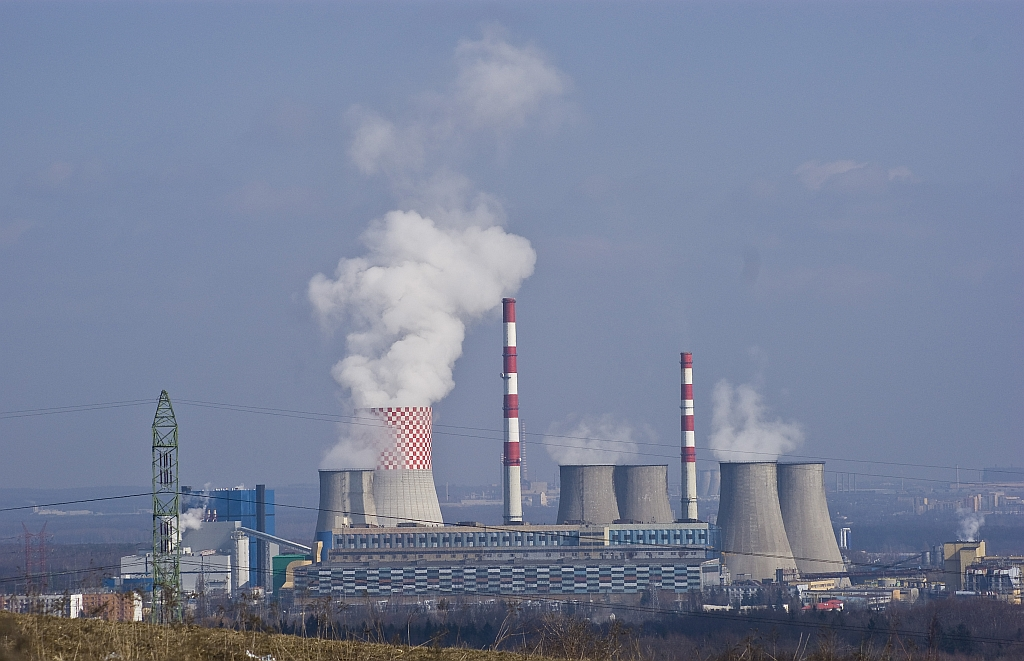
- Official name: Elektrownia Łagisza
- Country: Poland
- Location: Będzin
- Coordinates: 50°20′57″N 19°8′40″E
- Status: Operational
- Construction began: 1960
- Commission date: 1963; 2009
- Construction cost: €400 million
- Owner: PKE

Thermal power station
- Primary fuel: Coal
- Secondary fuel: Biomass
- Cogeneration?: Yes

Power generation
- Units operational: 5 x 120 MW; 1 x 460 MW CFB
- Make and model: Alstom; Foster Wheeler
- Nameplate capacity: 1,060 MW

External links
- Website: www.pke.pl
- Commons: Related media on Commons

Łagisza Power Station (Polish: Elektrownia Łagisza) is a coal-fired thermal power station at Łagisza in Będzin, Poland. The power plant has a total installed power capacity of 1,060 MW and installed cogeneration thermal capacity of 335 MW. It is operated by Południowy Koncern Energetyczny, a subsidiary of the Tauron Group.

Construction of the power station started in 1960, after it was decided in 1958 to build it. In 1963–1967, seven units with 120 MW generation capacity each were built. These units used two flue gas stacks: one with a height of 200 metres (660 ft) and one with a height of 160 metres (520 ft).

On 12 May 2006, construction of a new unit with 460 MW unit started. It was the world's first supercritical circulating fluidized bed project with the world's largest circulating fluidized bed boiler. The boiler was supplied by Foster Wheeler, while automation was supplied by Metso Automation. The generator was supplied by Alstom. The power station went in service on 30 June 2009, being built adjacent to the two old boilers it replaced. An interesting feature is that it has no chimney, as the new 133.2 metres (437 ft) tall cooling tower takes this function.

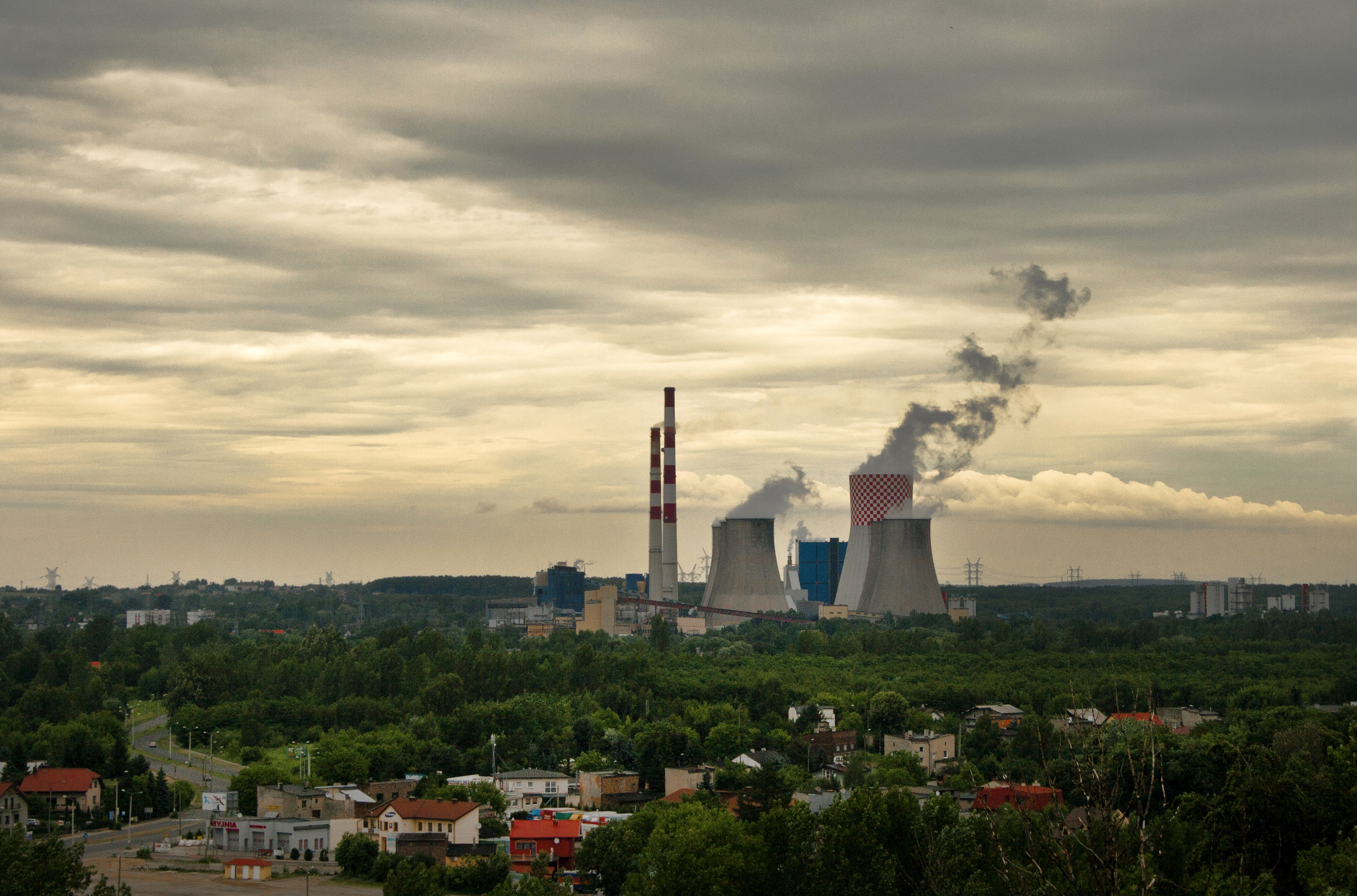
Łagisza Station panorama

== See also ==
- List of power stations in Poland
- Będzin Power Station
