= Raid on Fraustadt =

Polish raid on the German town of Fraustadt, September 2, 1939

- Part of the Invasion of Poland
Date	September 2, 1939
Location	Fraustadt, Province of Silesia, Germany
Result	Polish victory

Belligerents
Poland	Germany

Commanders and leaders
(Second Polish Republic) Władysław Wiecierzyński (Second Polish Republic) Edmund Lesisz	(Nazi Germany) Unknown

Strength
55th Poznan Infantry Regiment	Unknown border guard and garrison

Casualties and losses
Unknown	Unknown

The Raid on Fraustadt (Polish: Wypad na Wschowę) was a military raid, carried out by the Polish Army on September 2, 1939, the second day of the Invasion of Poland. Polish forces attacked Wehrmacht positions in and around the town of Fraustadt (present-day Wschowa), in the Province of Silesia, Free State of Prussia.

== Background ==
In the night of September 1/2, 1939, at app. 1 a.m., General Roman Abraham, who commanded Wielkopolska Cavalry Brigade, ordered a platoon of military cyclists stationed in Krzywin under Colonel Zbigniew Baranski to come to Leszno.

In the morning of September 2, observation planes of the Polish air force observed German positions around Fraustadt. At the same time, a company of bicycle-riding Polish scouts patrolled forests along the nearby border. At 2:30 p.m., General Abraham issued an order to carry out a raid on Fraustadt. According to his directive, Polish forces were to repel enemy units and shell the town. The raid was to be carried out by 55th. Poznan Infantry Regiment, stationed in Leszno. Colonel Waclaw Wiecierzynski, who commanded this unit, named Captain Edmund Lesisz leader of the raid.

The group which took part in the attack consisted of 300 soldiers and seven officers, with a platoon of military vehicles, a platoon of heavy machine guns and a platoon of artillery under Captain Ludwik Snitko. They were supported by a platoon of uhlans in the north, and a squadron of TKS tankettes, plus a platoon of military cyclists in the south. All three units communicated with each other via cyclists and mounted couriers.

== Raid ==
In the afternoon of September 2, at about 4 p.m., the units headed towards the border. Buses were provided for the infantry, while artillery, with horse carts, reached the border after the infantry. Captain Edmund Lesisz ordered Lieutenant Władysław Konwiński of 2nd Platoon to attack a Border Guard (Grenzschutz) post, which blocked the road towards the village of Geyersdorf (Dębowa Łąka). After a short exchange of fire, the Germans retreated, and the Poles captured the post, together with a large amount of weaponry, which was taken to the barracks at Leszno.

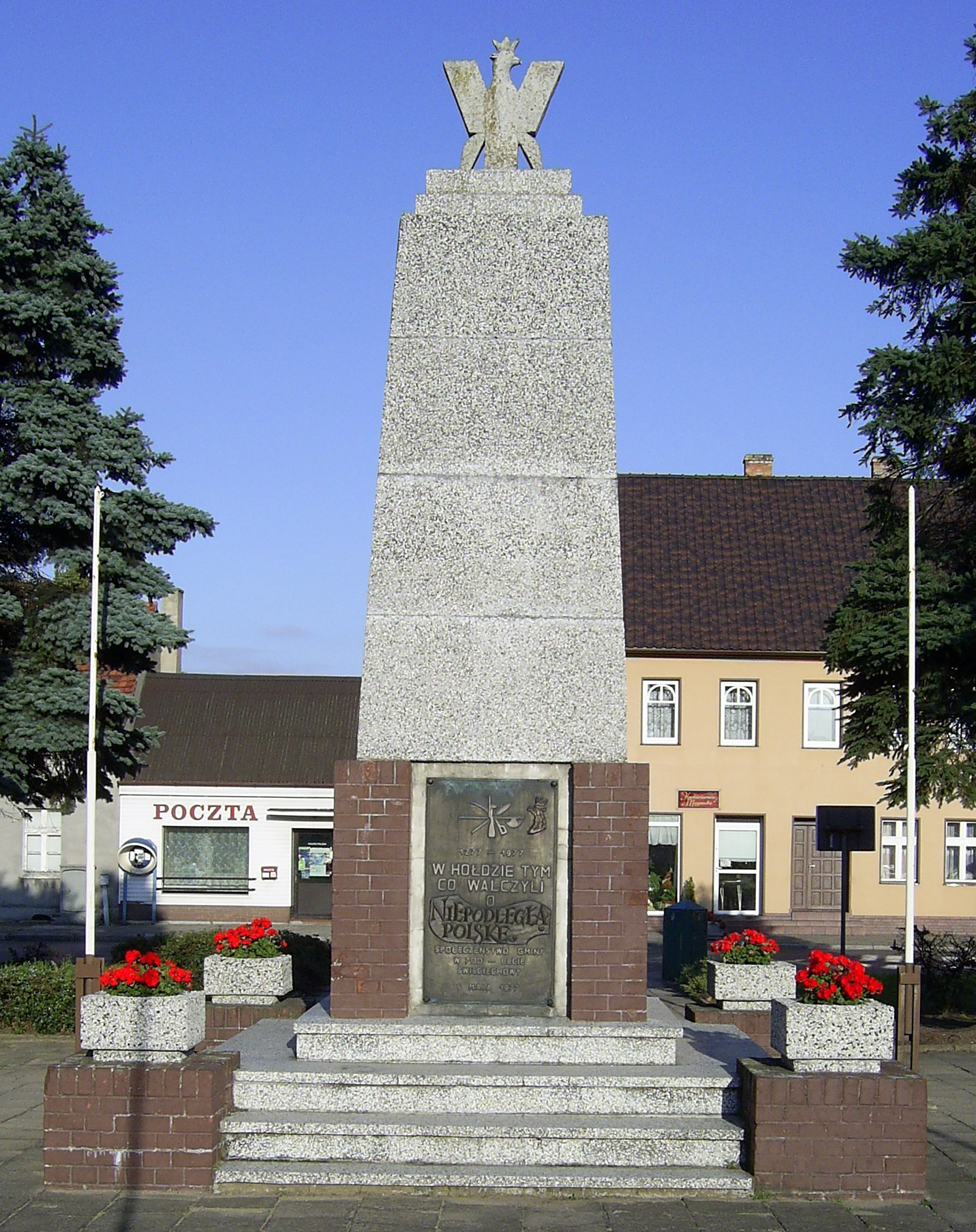
Monument to defenders of Poland's sovereignty in Święciechowa

Meanwhile, 1st Platoon of Lieutenant Stanisław Rybczyński attacked the border checkpoint, and Polish artillery took its designated positions. Soon afterward, Polish cannons opened fire on Geyersdorf, which resulted in panic among German soldiers. A number of TKS tankettes appeared in the village, supported by machine gun fire. As a result, German soldiers and civilians fled from Geyersdorf. The village was seized at app. 6 p.m. Soon afterward, Polish artillery began shelling of Fraustadt, killing some German soldiers. At the same time a Polish front unit, which was 3rd Platoon of Lieutenant Stefan Perkiewicz, reached the outskirts of Fraustadt, some 8 kilometers into German territory. The town itself was not seized, as before nightfall, General Roman Abraham ordered all Polish troops to return to Leszno.

During the retreat, an incident took place in of Święciechowa. Ethnic German residents of the village came out with Nazi flags to welcome the Polish soldiers, mistaking them for the advancing Wehrmacht. A gunfire exchange ensued, after which most active Germans were arrested by the military police.

After the Invasion of Poland, Captain Edmund Lesisz was captured by the Germans and sent to Oflag VII-A Murnau. Found there by the Gestapo, he was taken to Łódź and murdered.

== Aftermath ==
The raid on Fraustadt, together with the capture of Geyersdorf, was used by Polish propaganda to bolster the morale of soldiers of Wielkopolska Cavalry Brigade and other units, and convince them that it was possible to defeat the Wehrmacht. Nevertheless, from military and strategic point of view, it did not have any influence on the course of the campaign. Polish forces engaged in the raid were too weak, as General Abraham did not want to risk losing the city of Leszno.

The raid on Fraustadt is commemorated by a monument, which stands in the outskirts of Wschowa, along the road to Leszno.

== See also ==
- Polish army order of battle in 1939
- Fall Weiss (1939)
- Jabłonków Incident
- Invasion of Poland
- List of German military equipment of World War II
- List of World War II military equipment of Poland
