= Świerże Górne =

- Village
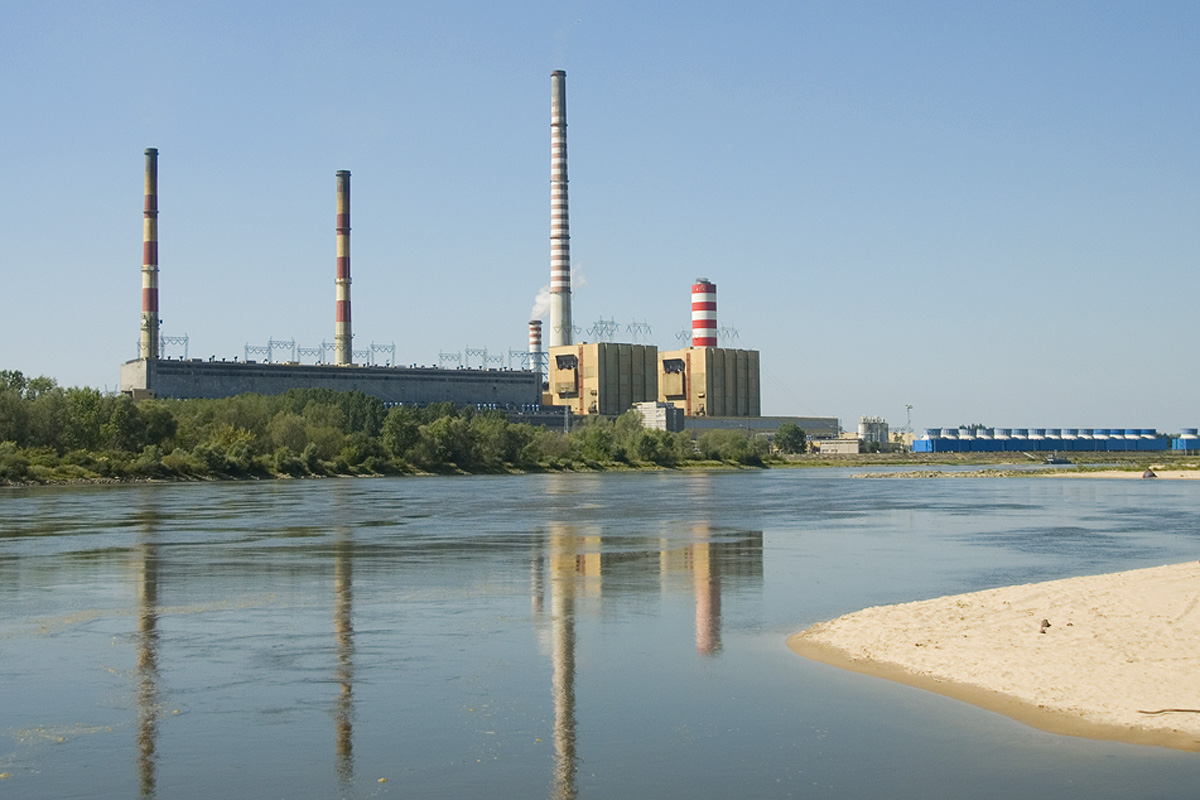
- Kozienice Power Station

- Location within Poland
- Coordinates: 51°39′N 21°29′E
- Country: Poland
- Voivodeship: Masovian
- County: Kozienice
- Gmina: Kozienice

Population
  - Total: 1,800

Świerże Górne (Polish pronunciation: [ˈɕfjɛrʐɛ ˈɡurnɛ]) is a village in the administrative district of Gmina Kozienice, within Kozienice County, Masovian Voivodeship, in east-central Poland.

Kozienice Power Station is located here.
