= Łódź Heat Power Stations =

Combined heat and power stations in Poland

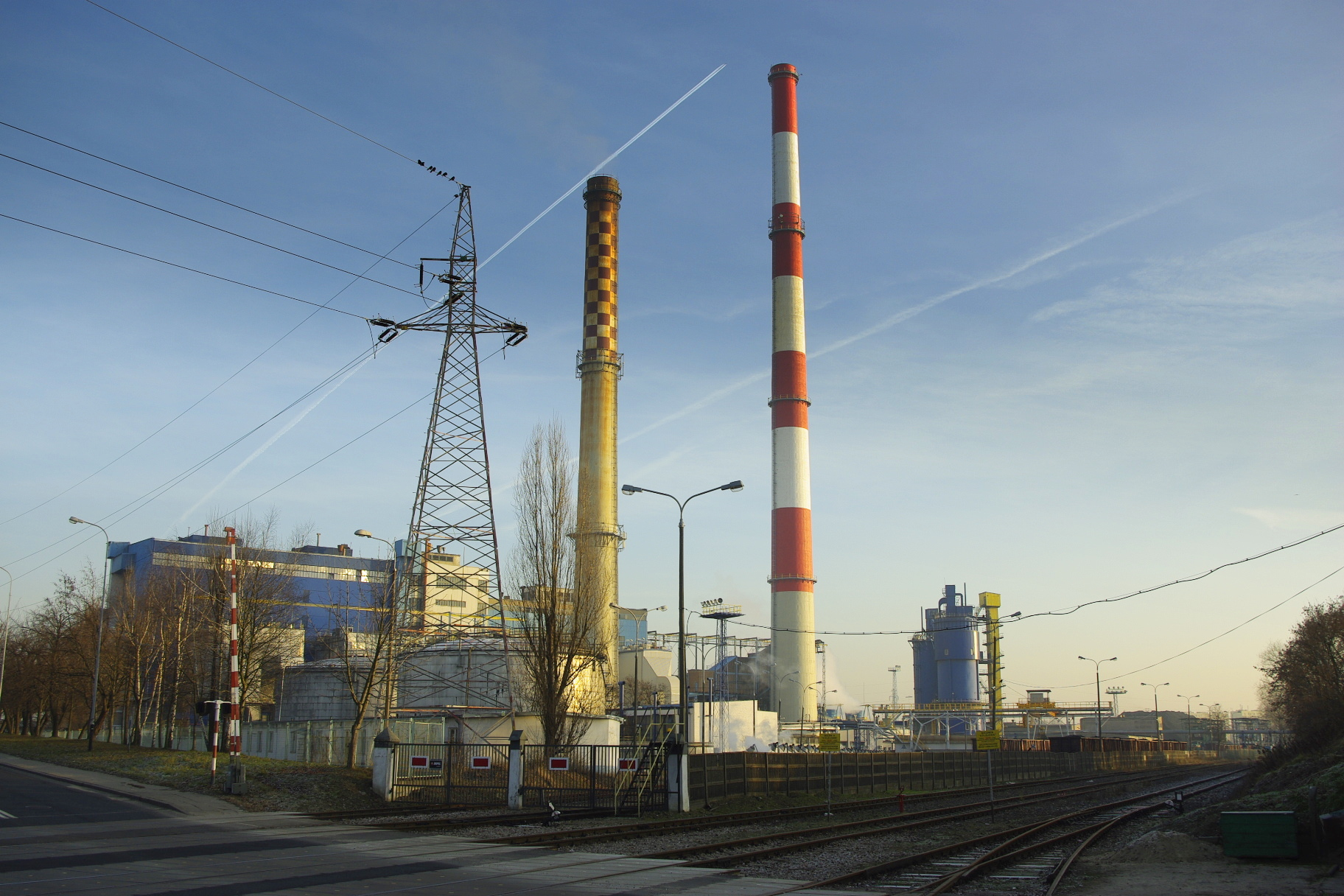
- Country: Poland
- Coordinates: 51°44′44″N 19°32′16″E

Power generation
- Nameplate capacity: 198.5 MW

External links
- Website: www.energiadlalodzi.pl
- Commons: Related media on Commons

Łódź III Heat Power Plant
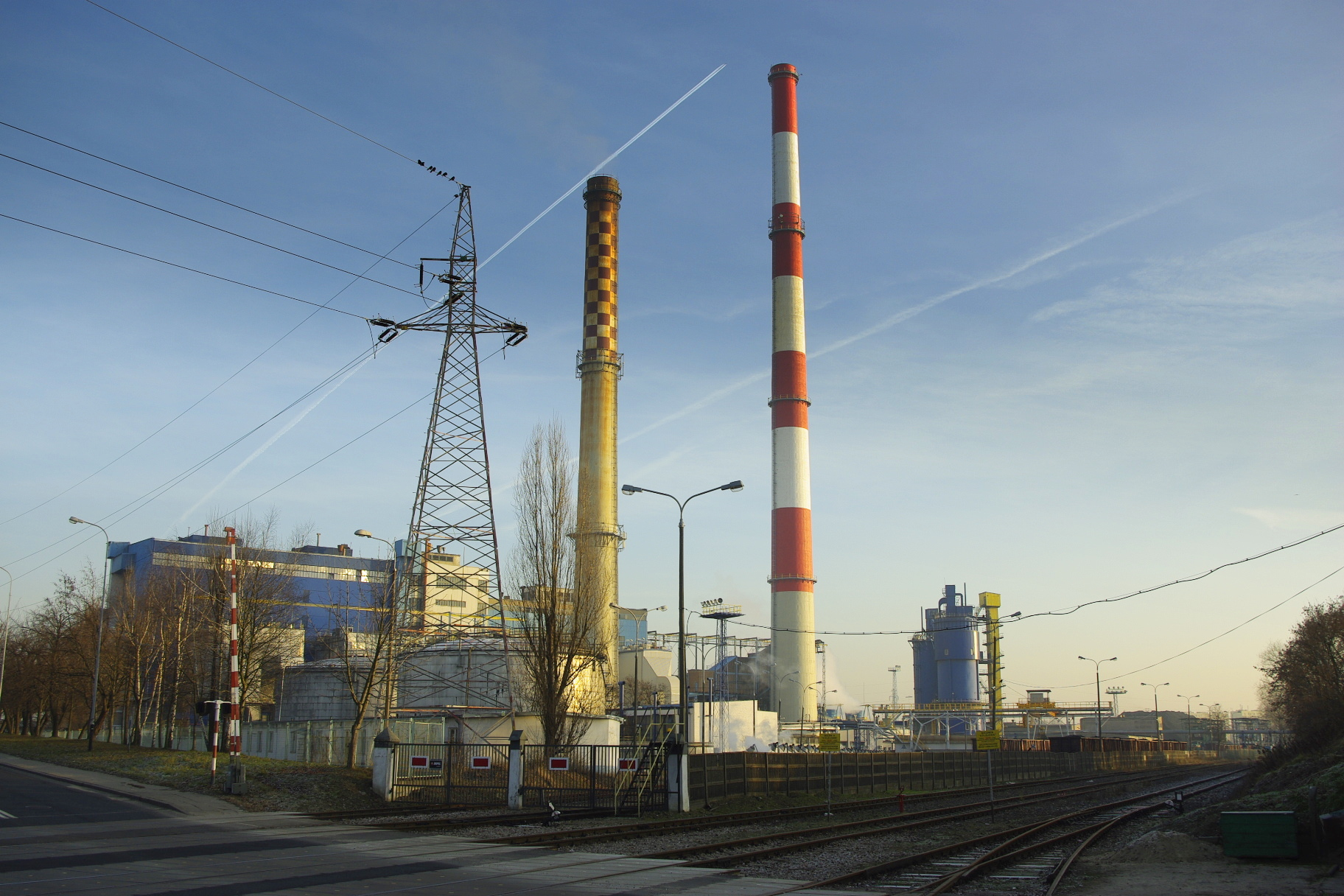
- Country: Poland
- Location: Łódź
- Coordinates: 51°47′53″N 19°25′17″E
- Status: Operational
- Commission date: 1968
- Owner: Veolia Energia Łódź S.A.

Thermal power station
- Primary fuel: Coal
- Cogeneration?: Yes

Power generation
- Units operational: 4
- Nameplate capacity: 206 MW

External links
- Website: www.energiadlalodzi.pl
- Commons: Related media on Commons

Łódź IV Heat Power Plant
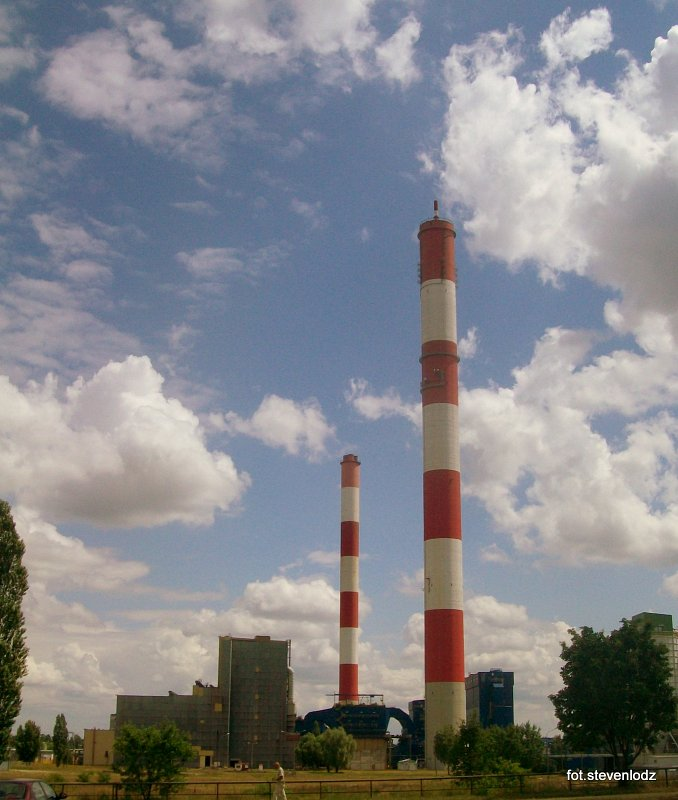
- Country: Poland
- Location: Łódź
- Coordinates: 51°44′43″N 19°32′16″E
- Status: Operational
- Commission date: 1977
- Owner: Veolia Energia Łódź S.A.

Thermal power station
- Primary fuel: Coal
- Cogeneration?: Yes

Power generation
- Nameplate capacity: 198 MW

External links
- Website: www.energiadlalodzi.pl
- Commons: Related media on Commons

Łódź Heat Power Stations (Polish: Zespół Elektrociepłowni w Łodzi), also known under the company name of Veolia Energia Łódź S.A., are combined heat and power stations in Łódź, Poland. They are operated by Veolia Energia Łódź.

They are 2 operating heat and power stations in Łódź.

	EC-3	EC-4
Name	Elektrociepłownia nr 3	Elektrociepłownia nr 4
Address	ul. Pojezierska 70, Łódź	ul. J. Andrzejewskiej 5, Łódź
Coordinates	51°47′53″N 19°25′17″E	51°44′43″N 19°32′16″E
Operational since	1968	1977
No. of boilers	8	6
No. of turbine sets	4	3
Temporary maximum thermal output capacity (MW)	804	820
Installed electricity capacity (MWe)	206	198
