= Rzeszów Power Station =

Coal-fired power station in Poland

- Official name: Elektrociepłownia Rzeszów
- Country: Poland
- Location: Rzeszów
- Coordinates: 50°3′51″N 22°1′49″E
- Status: Operational
- Commission date: 1976
- Owner: PGE
- Operator: PGE Elektrociepłownia Rzeszów SA

Thermal power station
- Primary fuel: Coal
- Secondary fuel: Natural gas
- Cogeneration?: Yes
- Thermal capacity: 336 MWt

Power generation
- Units operational: 1 x 101 MWe
- Nameplate capacity: 101 MWe

External links
- Website: www.ecrzeszow.pgegiek.pl

Rzeszow Power Station (Polish: Elektrociepłownia Rzeszów) is a coal-fired thermal power station in Rzeszów, Poland. In first construction phase four 25 MWt generators were built between 1976 and 1983. To these were added two Sefako WP-120 generators with a total thermal capacity of 280 MWt between 1983 and 1988. Plans to install two BC-50 units were cancelled. In 2003 one of the two WP-120 generators units was replaced by a gas-and-steam BGP-100 generator.

The flue gas stack of Rzeszow Power Station is 203 metres (666 ft) tall.
