= Gdańsk Power Station =

Power station in Poland

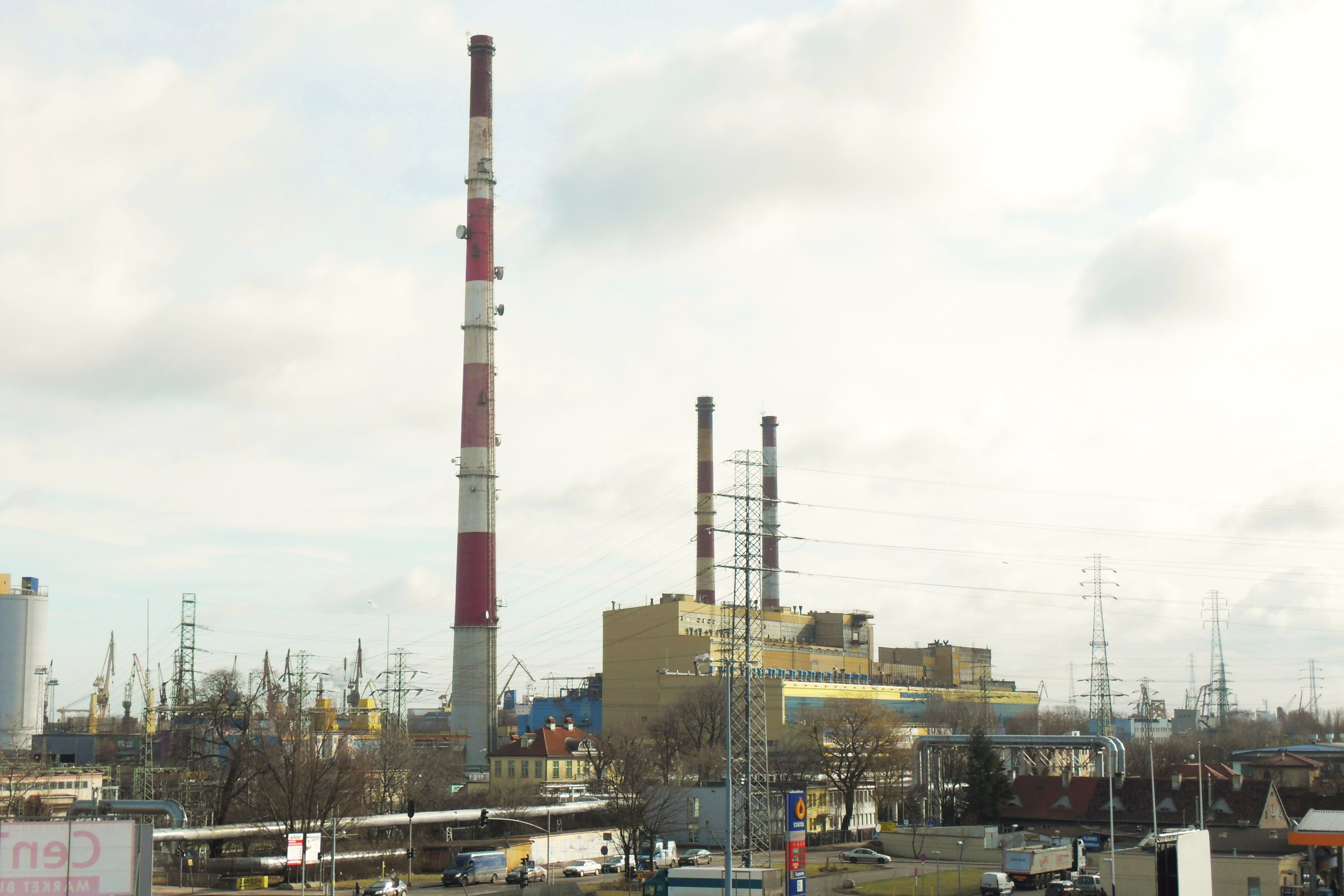
- Official name: Elektrociepłownia Gdańska
- Country: Poland
- Location: Gdańsk
- Coordinates: 54°22′41.9″N 18°38′30.1″E
- Status: Operational
- Commission date: 1970
- Owner: EDF
- Operator: Elektrociepłownie Wybrzeże

Thermal power station
- Primary fuel: Coal

Power generation
- Units operational: 5
- Nameplate capacity: 227 MW

External links
- Commons: Related media on Commons

Gdańsk Power Station (Polish: Elektrociepłownia Gdańska) is a combined heat and power station in Gdańsk, Poland. It is operated by PGE Energia Ciepła Oddział Wybrzeże, a subsidiary of PGE.

The power station has 5 power generation units and 2 boilers without electricity generation. The parameters of these installations are:

Facility	Type	Heat Generation Power [MW]	Electricity generation Power [MW]
Boiler	WP-70	81	-
Boiler	WP-120	154	-
Heat Power Station Unit	BC-22,5 nr 1	38,9	9,6
Heat Power Station Unit	BC-50 nr 2	112,1	52,8
Heat Power Station Unit	BC-50 nr 3	112,3	54
Heat Power Station Unit	BC-50 nr 4	112,6	57,5
Heat Power Station Unit	BC-50 nr 5	115,2	53
		726,1	226,9

Gdansk Power Station has three flue gas stacks: one with a height of 200 metres (660 ft), which is the tallest structure in Gdańsk, and two with a height of 120 metres (390 ft).
