= Będzin Power Station =

Cogeneration plant in Będzin, Poland

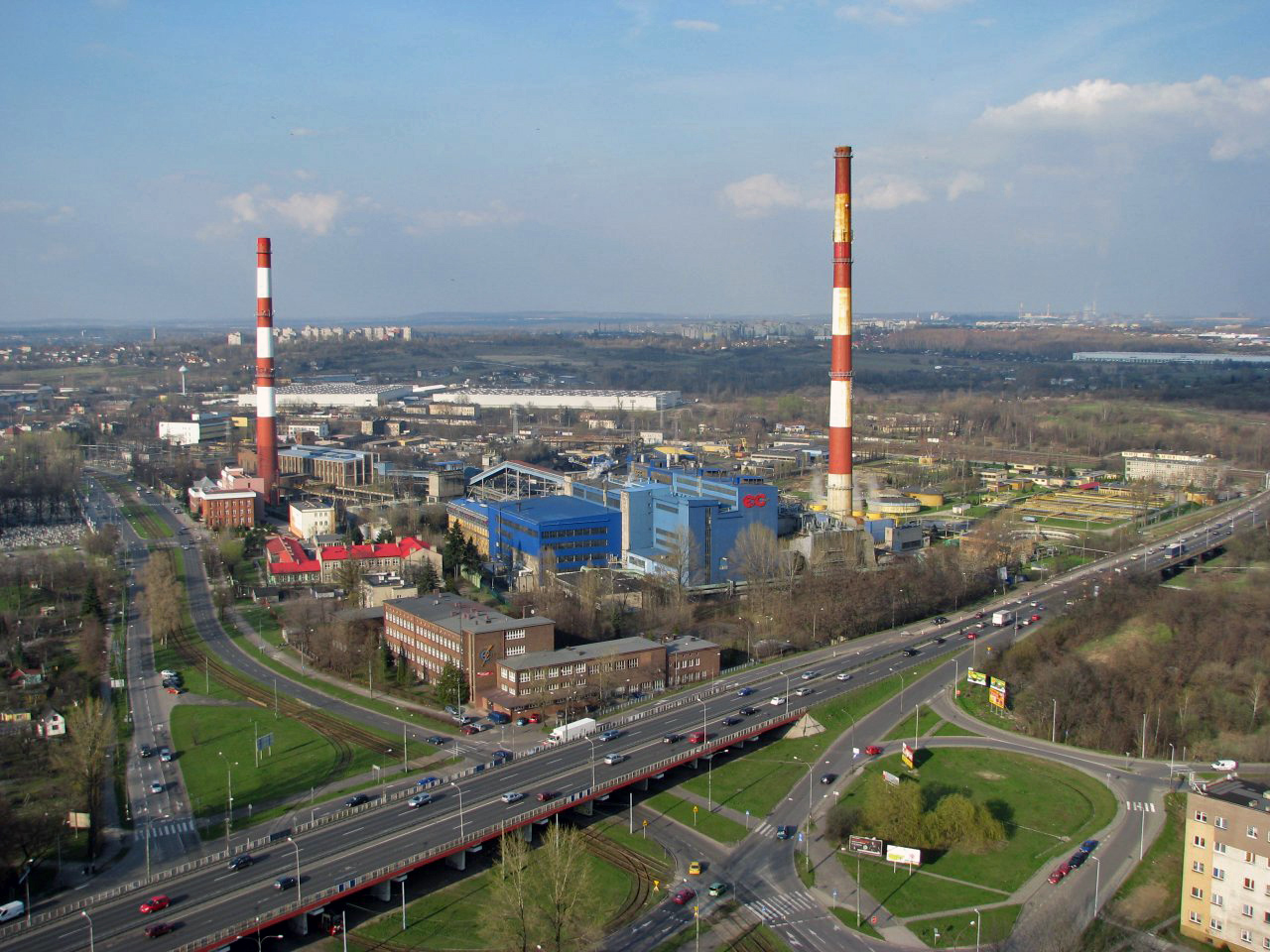
- Official name: Elektrociepłownia Będzin
- Country: Poland
- Location: Będzin
- Coordinates: 50°18′14″N 19°8′16″E
- Status: Operational
- Construction began: 1913
- Commission date: 1916
- Owner: Elektrociepłownia Będzin S.A.
- Thermal capacity: 445 MWt

Power generation
- Units operational: 81.5 MW
- Make and model: 13UCK 80
- Nameplate capacity: 81.5 MW
- Annual net output: 151 GW·h (2014)

External links
- Website: www.pke.pl
- Commons: Related media on Commons

Będzin Power Station (Polish: Elektrociepłownia Będzin) is a cogeneration plant in Będzin, Silesian Voivodeship, Poland.

The plant is operated by the Elektrociepłownia Będzin S.A. company. It is the major energy provider for the Zagłębie Dąbrowskie. Its construction begun in 1913, and it started operating in 1916. The company is a stock action company since 1993, and is listed on the Warsaw Stock Exchange.

Electrical production in 2014 was 151,140 MW·h. Rated capacity of the two OP-140 utility boilers is 2 x 145 t/h = 290 t/h, equivalent to 112,6 MWt each, 225,2 MWt total.

Rated heat capacity of the heating boilers (1 x WP-70 and 1 x WP-120) is 220.2 MWt. The total installed heat capacity is 445.4 MWt plus 83.5 MWt in cogeneration from the 13UCK 80 turboset. (UCK is a turbine classification acronym which stands for "kondensacyjne z upustami przemysłowymi i ciepłowniczymi", polish for "condensation with industrial and district heating")

== See also ==
- Łagisza Power Station
