= Bełchatów Power Station =

Coal-fired power plant in Łódź Voivodeship, Poland

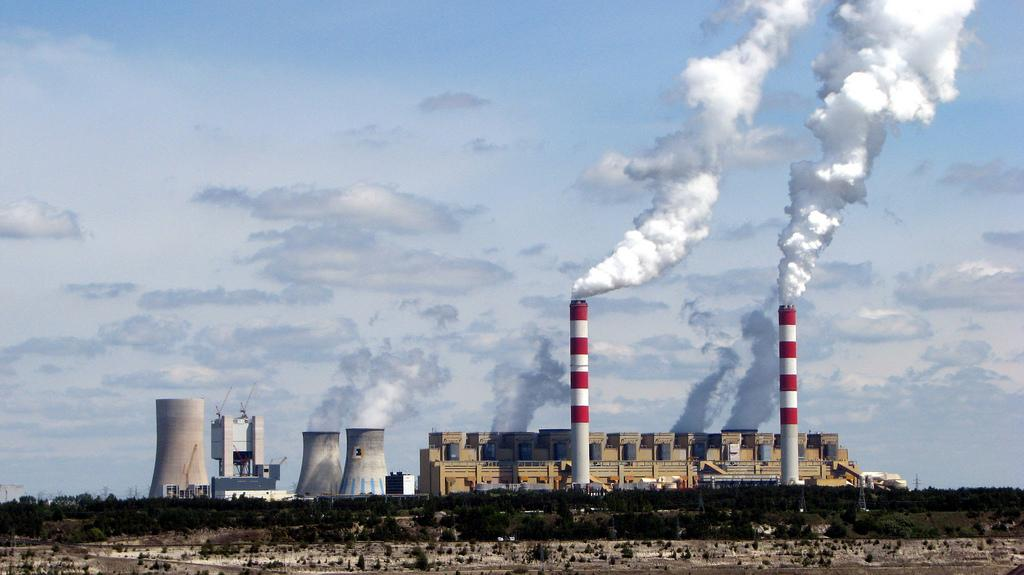
- Official name: Elektrownia Bełchatów
- Country: Poland
- Location: Bełchatów, Łódź Voivodeship
- Coordinates: 51°15′59″N 19°19′50″E
- Status: Operational
- Commission date: 1982
- Owner: PGE
- Operator: PGE GiEK – Elektrownia Bełchatów

Thermal power station
- Primary fuel: Lignite

Power generation
- Units operational: 11 x 370/380 MW; 1 x 858 MW
- Nameplate capacity: 5,102 MW
- Annual net output: 27–28 TWh

External links
- Website: elbelchatow.pgegiek.pl
- Commons: Related media on Commons

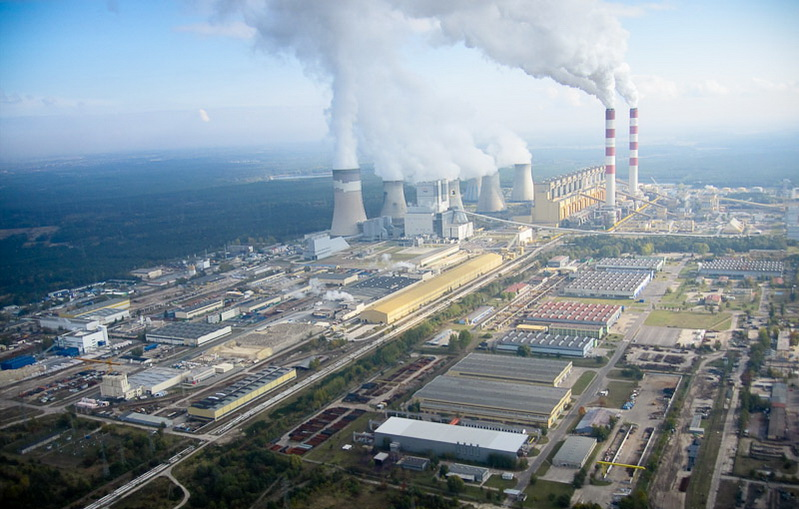
Bełchatów Power Station view at the top

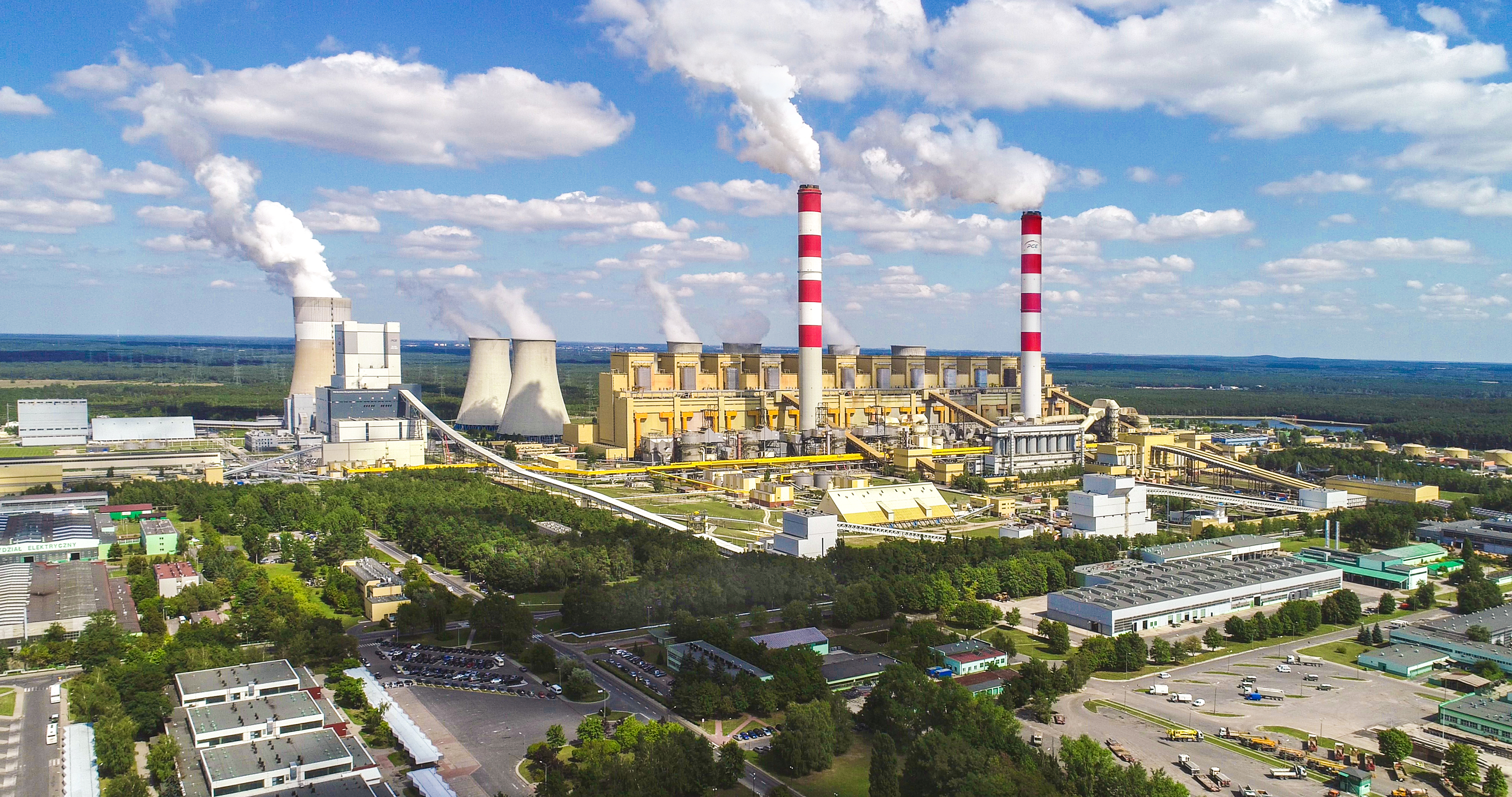
Bełchatów Power Plant

Bełchatów Power Station is a coal-fired power station near Bełchatów, Poland. It is Europe's largest coal-fired power station. The power station is owned and operated by PGE GiEK Oddział Elektrownia Bełchatów, a subsidiary of Polska Grupa Energetyczna.

In 2011, a new 858 MW unit was commissioned. increasing the station's total capacity to 5,053 MW. The new unit has an efficiency rating of approximately 42%, contributed to reduction of both fuel consumption and emissions compared to the older units. The unit has been built by Alstom. Alstom also has modernized the low pressure parts in all 12 turbines and, in 2009, PGE and Alstom signed a contract to modernise unit 6. After modernization of other units, the total installed capacity reached 5,420 MW in 2015. In 2017, the electrical capacity of Elektrownia Bełchatow was increased to 5,472 MW. The plant's current achievable capacity is 5,102 MW. In the second half of 2019, the achievable capacity was reduced due to the decommissioning of the oldest unit (unit No 1).

The station's flue gas is vented through two 300 m (980 ft) tall chimneys, among Poland's tallest free-standing structures. Lignite (brown coal) for the plant is provided by a large neighboring strip mine Bełchatów coal mine.

The building of the power station itself has a height of 118 metres, a length of 740 metres and a width of 117 metres.

== Local and large scale pollution ==
The facility is estimated to be the most toxic in Europe.

It is Poland’s largest NO_{x} emitter and emits many air pollutants, among them NO_{2} harmful particulate matter, PAHs, as well as heavy metals carried in the coal. In the case of mercury, heavy metals are emitted in gaseous form; other heavy metals (such as the carcinogens lead, cadmium, and nickel) are contained in the particulate matter.

== Carbon dioxide emissions ==
Bełchatów is the fifth largest coal-fired power plant in the world. According to estimates, in 2018, it emitted 37.6 million tons of carbon dioxide, more than any other power station, with relative emissions estimated at 1.756 kg per kWh. The plant releases more carbon dioxide each year than the entirety of Switzerland.

In order to reduce CO_{2} emissions, PGE sought to introduce carbon capture and storage technology. In 2008, it signed a memorandum of understanding with Alstom, according to which Alstom would design and construct a pilot carbon capture plant at Unit 12 by mid-2011. A larger carbon capture plant was to be integrated with the new 858 MW unit by 2015. The project failed to receive a European Commission grant for €180 million from the European Energy Programme for Recovery, and was cancelled in 2013.

== Future ==
In September 2020, the District Court in Łódź ordered settlement talks between PGE GiEK and ClientEarth regarding the reduction of the environmental and climate impact of the Bełchatów Power Plant.

On October 19, 2020, PGE Polska Grupa Energetyczna published the Group's new strategy for the decade running up to 2030 with an outlook to 2050. The company presented the Group's transition and decarbonisation plan and announced the goal of achieving climate neutrality by 2050.

The PGE project "Just transformation of the Bełchatów complex" initially consists of photovoltaic farms, wind farms, and a thermal waste treatment installation with energy recovery; it would be the first stage in the process of regional transition towards carbon neutrality.

In June 2021, local authorities published a plan for public consultation that would see the plant decommissioned by 2036, with support from the Just Transition fund.

== See also ==
- Renewable energy in Poland
- Wind power in Poland
- Solar power in Poland

== See also ==
- List of power stations in Poland
- List of largest power stations
- List of least carbon efficient power stations
- List of coal power stations
