= List of tallest chimneys =

This list of the tallest chimneys in the world ranks chimneys by height.

== Use ==
Although many kinds of industrial facilities have tall chimneys, most of the chimneys with heights of 200 m (660 ft) or more are part of thermal, especially coal-fired power stations. This is to increase the stack effect and disperse pollutants. Only a few smelters, steel mills, chemical factories and oil refineries use such tall chimneys.

== Timeline of world's tallest chimney ==
Since the beginning of the Industrial Revolution, tall chimneys were built, at the beginning with bricks, and later also of concrete or steel. Although chimneys never held the absolute height record, they are among the tallest free-standing architectural structures and often hold national records (as tallest free-standing or as overall tallest structures of a country).

Held record		Name and location	Completed	Height		Notes
From	To	Name and location	Completed	(m)	(ft)	Notes
1820	1835	Chimney of North Lotts Glass Bottle Company, Dublin, Ireland	1820	30	95	
1835	1842	Adams' Soap Works Chimney, Smethwick, Birmingham, England, UK	September–October 1836	97.5	312	
1842	1859	Tennant's Stalk, Glasgow, Scotland, UK	29 June 1842	132.7	435.5	Struck by lightning and shortened; demolished in 1922.
1859	1885	Port Dundas Townsend Chimney, Glasgow, Scotland, UK	6 October 1859	138.3	454	Demolished in 1928.
1885	1889	Langer Emil, Mechernich, Germany	19 September 1885	134.6	442	Demolished on 28 October 1961.
1889	1908	Halsbrücker Esse, Halsbrücke, Germany	28 October 1889	140	459	
1908	1914	The Big Stack, Great Falls, Montana, US	23 November 1908	154.8	508	Demolished in 1982.
1914	1916	Hitachi Smelter and Refinery Stack, Hitachi, Ibaraki, Japan	13 March 1914	155.7	511	Partially collapsed in 1993.
1916	1917	Saganoseki Smelter and Refinery First Stack, Saganoseki, Ōita, Japan	November 1916	167.6	550	Demolished in 2013.
1917	1919	Ruston Smelter Stack, Ruston, Washington, US	1917	174.0	571	Demolished on 17 January 1993.
1919	1937	Anaconda Smelter Stack, Anaconda, Montana, US	5 May 1919	178.3	585	Tallest chimney built of bricks.
1937	1951	Lead Smelter Chimney of American Smelting and Refining Co, Selby, California, US	1937	184.7	606	Possibly demolished in 1972–73.
1951	1954	Lead Smelter Chimney of American Smelting and Refining Co, El Paso, Texas, US	1950–51	183 or 186	600 or 611'8"	Conflicting information on actual height or the chimney's height may have been subsequently reduced. Demolished in April 2013.
1954	1962	INCO Copper Cliff Nickel Refinery Stack, Sudbury, Ontario, Canada	1954	194	637	
1962	1965	Chimney of Schilling Power Station, Stade, West Germany (Germany)	1962	220	722	Demolished in 2006.
1965	1966	First chimney of ASARCO Copper Smelter, El Paso, Texas, US	1965	248	813	Possibly demolished.
1966	1967	Chimney of Kashira Power Plant, Kashira, USSR (Russia)	1966	250	820	Also used as electricity pylons for a 220 kV line from the power station to the switchyard
1967	1967	Second chimney of ASARCO Copper Smelter, El Paso, Texas, US	30 January 1967	252.5	828	Demolished in April 2013.
1967	1968	Chimney of Lippendorf Power Station, Neukieritzsch, East Germany (Germany)	1967	300	984	Demolished in 2005.
1968	1971	Chimney of Mitchell Power Plant, Moundsville, West Virginia, US	26 October 1968	367.6	1,206	
1971	1987	Vale Superstack, Copper Cliff, Ontario, Canada	1971	380	1,247	
1987		GRES-2 Power Station, Ekibastuz, USSR (Kazakhstan)	1987	419.7	1,377	

Hamon Custodis claims to have built a 707 ft (215 m) stack in 1953, but there are no references to the location or client of this/these stack(s). Skyscraperpage indicates the 846-foot-tall (258 m) chimney of Omskaya Cogeneration Plant #4 was built in 1965, but it is likely that this date is referring to the construction of the first section of the plant with the smaller chimney. No other references or information can be found to corroborate this claim.

== List ==
Indicates a structure that is no longer standing.
indicates a structure in the process of being removed.
indicates a structure that has had a height reduction.

Name	Pinnacle height		Year	Country	Town	Remarks
Chimney of GRES-2 Power Station	1,377 ft	419.7 m	1987	Kazakhstan	Ekibastuz	Tallest chimney in the world.
Inco Superstack	1,250 ft	380.1 m	1971	Canada	Sudbury, Ontario	Tallest chimney in the Western Hemisphere. Scheduled for demolition. The dismantling of the superstack commenced in the summer of 2025 and as of October 2025 the stack height was reduced by about 35 meters, giving it a current height of approximately ~355 meters.
Original Unit 3 chimney of Homer City Generating Station	1,217 ft	371 m	1977	United States	Homer City, Pennsylvania	Demolished by explosives on 22 March 2025. Tallest chimney in the United States, replaced by one of 860 ft (260 m) that serves the flue gas scrubber retro-fitted to Unit 3 in 2001.
Kennecott Smokestack	1,215 ft	370.4 m	1974	United States	Magna, Utah	Tallest chimney west of the Mississippi.
Chimney of Berezovskaya GRES	1,214 ft	370 m	1985	Russia	Sharypovo	Tallest chimney in Russia.
Original chimney of Mitchell Power Plant	1,206 ft	367.6 m	1968	United States	Moundsville, West Virginia	Tallest chimney in the world from 1968 to 1971, replaced by a 1,000 ft (300 m) 2-flue chimney serving the scrubber and retrofitted to the plant in 2006.
Trbovlje Chimney	1,181 ft	360 m	1976 (1 June)	Slovenia	Trbovlje	Tallest chimney in Europe.
Chimney of Endesa Power Station	1,168 ft	356 m	1974	Spain	As Pontes, Galicia	The tallest multi-flue chimney in the world, and the most massive chimney in the world by volume of materials used in construction.
Chimney of Phoenix Copper Smelter	1,153 ft	351.5 m	1995	Romania	Baia Mare	Tallest structure in Romania.
Third chimney of Syrdarya Power Plant	1,148 ft	350 m	1980	Uzbekistan	Shirin	
Chimney of Teruel Power Plant	1,125 ft	343 m	1981	Spain	Teruel	Demolished by explosives on 16 February 2023, the tallest freestanding structure ever demolished by explosives.
Chimney of Plomin Power Station	1,116 ft	340 m	1999	Croatia	Plomin	
Original chimney of Mountaineer Power Plant	1,103 ft	336.2 m	1980	United States	New Haven, West Virginia	Its functionally has been replaced by a 1,000 ft (300 m) FDG stack that serves the flue gas scrubbers retrofitted to the plant.
Original Chimney of the Gavin Power Plant	1,103 ft	336.2 m	1974	United States	Cheshire, Ohio	This chimney was reduced to ~500 feet at some point in the 1990s from its original height of 1,100 feet. Its functionally has been replaced by two of 800 ft (240 m) that serves the flue gas scrubbers retrofitted to the plant.
Chimney of Kharkiv TEC-5	1,083 ft	330 m	1991	Ukraine	Kharkiv	
Third chimney of Primorskaya GRES	1,083 ft	330 m	1990	Russia	Luchegorsk	
Second chimney of Gusinoozyorskaya GRES	1,083 ft	330 m	1988	Russia	Gusinoozyorsk	
Fifth chimney of the Cuciurgan power station	1,083 ft	330 m	1987	Moldova	Dnestrovsc	
Chimney of Novo-Angrenskaya Power Plant	1,083 ft	330 m	1985	Uzbekistan	Olmaliq, Angren	
Two chimneys of Permskaya GRES	1,083 ft	330 m	1982/1992	Russia	Dobryanka	
Second chimney of Ekibastuz GRES-1	1,083 ft	330 m	1982	Kazakhstan	Ekibastuz	
Chimney of Zuevska thermal power station	1083 ft	330 m	1981	Ukraine	Zuhres, Donetsk Oblast	
Fourth Chimney of Reftinskaya GRES	1,083 ft	330 m	1979	Russia	Reftinsky	
Chimney of Pirdop copper smelter and refinery	1,066 ft	325 m	1987	Bulgaria	Pirdop	
Chimney of Maritsa Iztok-3 Power Station	1,065 ft	324.6 m	1980	Bulgaria	Stara Zagora	
Two chimneys of Maritsa Iztok-2 Power Station	1,065 ft	324.6 m	1977/1980	Bulgaria	Stara Zagora	No.2, No.3
Two chimneys of Kirishskaya GRES	1,050 ft	320 m	1984/1986	Russia	Kirishi	
Two chimneys of Azerbaijan Thermal Power Plant	1,050 ft	320 m	1981/1990	Azerbaijan	Mingachevir	Tallest free-standing structure in the South Caucasus.
Third chimney of Kostromskaya GRES	1,050 ft	320 m	1980	Russia	Volgorechensk	
Two chimneys of Ryazanskaya GRES	1,050 ft	320 m	1973/1980	Russia	Novomichurinsk	
Two chimneys of Vuhlehirska thermal power plant	1,050 ft	320 m	1972/1975	Ukraine	Svitlodarsk	
Two chimneys of Zaporozhskaya GRES	1,050 ft	320 m	1972/1977	Ukraine	Enerhodar	
Chimney of Rockport Power Plant	1,038 ft	316.4 m	1984	United States	Rockport, Indiana	
Chimney of Ugljevik Power Plant	1,017 ft	310 m	1985	Bosnia and Herzegovina	Ugljevik	
Chimney of Armstrong Power Plant	1,011 ft	308.15 m	1982	United States	Kittanning, Pennsylvania	
Chimney of Harllee Branch Power Plant	1,007 ft	307 m	1978	United States	Milledgeville, Georgia	Demolished on 15 October 2016 by explosives.
Chimney of Buschhaus Power Station	1,007 ft	307 m	1984	Germany	Helmstedt, Lower Saxony	
Chimney of Jaworzno Power Station	1,004 ft	306 m	1977	Poland	Jaworzno	
Chimney of Trepça Lead Smelter	1,004 ft	306 m	1972	Serbia	Trepça	
Two chimneys of Robert W Scherer Power Plant	1,001 ft	305 m	1983/1985	United States	Juliette, Georgia	
Chimney of Independence Power Plant	1,001 ft	305 m	1983	United States	Newark, Arkansas	
Chimney of Kyger Creek Power Plant	1,001 ft	305 m	1980	United States	Cheshire, Ohio	
Chimney of White Bluff Power Plant	1,001 ft	305 m	1980	United States	Pine Bluff, Arkansas	
Chimney of Widows Creek Power Plant	1,001 ft	305 m	1977	United States	Stevenson, Alabama	Demolished on 3 December 2020 by explosives.
Chimney of Chvaletice Power Station	1,001 ft	305 m	1977	Czech Republic	Chvaletice	
Chimney of Hal B. Wansley Power Plant	1,001 ft	305 m	1976	United States	Carrollton, Georgia	
Two chimneys of Kingston Power Plant	1,001 ft	305 m	1976	United States	Kingston, Tennessee	Units 1–5 & 6–9
Two chimneys of Plant Bowen	1,001 ft	305 m	1975	United States	Cartersville, Georgia	
Three chimneys of Harrison Power Station	1,001 ft	305 m	1972/1973/1994	United States	Haywood, West Virginia	Units 1+2 & 2+3
Two chimneys of Conemaugh Generating Station	1,001 ft	305 m	1970/1971	United States	Seward, Pennsylvania	Units 1&2
Two chimneys of Cumberland Fossil Plant	1,001 ft	305 m	1970	United States	Cumberland City, Tennessee	Units 1&2
Chimney of W. H. Sammis Power Plant	1,001 ft	305 m	1970	United States	Stratton, Ohio	Unit 7
Chimney of Hayden Smelter	1,001 ft	305 m	197?	United States	Hayden, Arizona	
Two chimneys of Pleasants Power Plant	1,000 ft	304.8 m	1979/1980	United States	Belmont, West Virginia	
Chimney of Cardinal Power Plant	1,000 ft	304.8 m	1977	United States	Brilliant, Ohio	Unit 3
Chimney #2 of Mitchell Power Plant	1,000 ft	304.8 m	2006	United States	Moundsville, West Virginia	
Chimney of Power Plant Chemnitz	990 ft	301.8 m	1984	Germany	Chemnitz	
Chimney of SASOL III Synthetic Fuel Production Plant	988 ft	301 m	1979	South Africa	Secunda	Tallest chimney in the Southern Hemisphere.
Chimney of Volzhskaya TEC-2	986 ft	300.7 m	1988	Russia	Volzhsky	
Chimney of Tuzla Thermal Power Plant	984 ft	300 m	1963	Bosnia and Herzegovina	Tuzla	
Chimney of Lippendorf Power Station	984 ft	300 m	1967	Germany	Lippendorf, Saxony	Briefly the tallest chimney in the world. Demolished in 2005.
Chimney of Thierbach Power Station	984 ft	300 m	1968	Germany	Espenhain, Saxony	Demolished in 2002.
Chimney for Units B-E of Power Plant Scholven	984 ft	300 m	1968	Germany	Gelsenkirchen	also used as electricity pylon for the 220 kV-line leaving Unit D
Chimney for Units F-H of Power Plant Scholven	984 ft	300 m	1974	Germany	Gelsenkirchen	
Chimney of Marl-Chemiepark Power Station	984 ft	300 m	197?	Germany	Marl, North Rhine-Westphalia	Demolished in 1995.
Chimney of Vojany Power Station, EVO 2	984 ft	300 m	1974	Slovakia	Vojany	Height was reduced to 175 m (574 ft) in 1998.
Chimney of Tušimice Power Station	984 ft	300 m	1974	Czech Republic	Tušimice	Demolished in 2011–2012.
Second chimney of Rybnik Power Station	984 ft	300 m	1974	Poland	Rybnik	
Chimney of Novaky Power Plant	984 ft	300 m	1976	Slovakia	Nováky	
Chimney of Clifty Creek Power Plant	984 ft	300 m	1978	United States	Madison, Indiana	
Chimney of Kozienice Power Station	984 ft	300 m	1978	Poland	Kozienice	
Two chimneys of Bełchatów Power Station	984 ft	300 m	1979/1982	Poland	Bełchatów	
Four chimneys of Boxberg Power Station	984 ft	300 m	1979	Germany	Boxberg, Saxony	Demolished in 2000, 2009 and 2012.
First chimney of Ekibastuz GRES-1	984 ft	300 m	1980	Kazakhstan	Ekibastuz	
Chimney of Prunéřov Power Station	984 ft	300 m	1981	Czech Republic	Kadaň	Unit 2
Chimney North of Romag-Termo Power Plant	984 ft	300 m	1981	Romania	Halanga	
Three chimneys of Power Station Jänschwalde	984 ft	300 m	1981	Germany	Jänschwalde	Demolished in 2002–2007.
Chimney of Westerholt Power Station	984 ft	300 m	1981	Germany	Gelsenkirchen–Westerholt	Demolished on 3 December 2006. Height confirmed as 300 m (980 ft) rather than 337 m (1,106 ft).
Chimney of Duvha Power Station	984 ft	300 m	1982	South Africa	Witbank	
Chimney of Warszawa-Kawęczyn Power Station	984 ft	300 m	1983	Poland	Warsaw	
Chimney of Kemerkoy Power Plant	984 ft	300 m	1983	Turkey	Mugla	
Chimney of Kakanj Thermal Power Plant	984 ft	300 m	1987	Bosnia and Herzegovina	Čatići	
Chimney of Walsum Power Station	984 ft	300 m	1988	Germany	Duisburg-Walsum, North Rhine-Westphalia	
Chimney of Bishkek TEC	984 ft	300 m	1989	Kyrgyzstan	Bishkek	
Chimney of Herne Power Station	984 ft	300 m	1989	Germany	Herne, North Rhine-Westphalia	
Third chimney of Orot Rabin	984 ft	300 m	1997	Israel	Hadera	
Litvínov Chimney	984 ft	300 m	?	Czech Republic	Litvínov	Under construction.
Stružnice Chimney	984 ft	300 m	?	Czech Republic	Stružnice	
Chimney of Provence Power Station	974 ft	297 m	1984	France	Gardanne	
Chimney of TPP Kostolac, Unit B	968 ft	295 m	1987	Serbia	Kostolac	
Second chimney of Compostilla II Power Station	951 ft	290 m	1984	Spain	Cubillos del Sil	
Chimney of Bruce Mansfield Power Plant, Unit 1 + 2	950 ft	289.6 m	1976	United States	Shippingport, Pennsylvania	
Chimney of Bergkamen Power Station	932 ft	284 m	1981	Germany	Bergkamen, North Rhine-Westphalia	
Third chimney of Krasnoyarskaya TEC-3	929 ft	283.2 m	1991	Russia	Krasnoyarsk	
Chimney of Werdohl-Elverlingsen Power Station	925 ft	282 m	1982	Germany	Werdohl, North Rhine-Westphalia	
Chimney of Fundidora Mexicana de Cobre	919 ft	280 m	1988	Mexico	Nacozari	
Chimney of Nikola Tesla Power Station, Unit B	918 ft	280 m	1983	Serbia	Obrenovac	
Chimney of CET Brașov	918 ft	280 m	?	Romania	Brașov	
Four chimneys of CET Turceni	918 ft	280 m	1978/1980/1983/1987	Romania	Turceni	
Chimney of CET Rovinari	918 ft	280 m	?	Romania	Rovinari	
Chimney of CET Pitești	918 ft	280 m	?	Romania	Pitești	
Second chimney of TEC-5	910 ft	277.5 m	1983	Russia	Omsk	
Third chimney of Matla Power Station Smokestack	906 ft	276 m	1982	South Africa	Kriel	Destroyed
Chimney of TEC-6	906 ft	276 m	1982	Ukraine	Kyiv	
Chimney of John E. Amos Power Plant	904 ft	275.4 m	1971/1973	United States	Winfield, West Virginia	
Chimney of Dahanu Thermal Power Station	903 ft	275.3 m	1995	India	Dahanu	Tallest in India.
Fourth chimney of Krasnoyarskaya TEC-1	902 ft	275 m	2020	Russia	Krasnoyarsk	
Chimney of Adhunik Power & Natural Resource Ltd	902 ft	275 m	2012	India	Padampur, Jharkhand	
Chimney of Korba Power Plant	902 ft	275 m	2009	India	Korba	
Chimney of Deenbandhu Chhotu Ram Thermal Power Station	902 ft	275 m	2008	India	Yamunanagar	
Chimneys of Captive Power Plant, Vedanta Aluminium Ltd	902 ft	275 m	2007	India	Jharsuguda, Odisha	
Chimney of Sagardighi Thermal Power Station	902 ft	275 m	2004	India	Sagardighi, Murshidabad	
Two chimneys of Rihand Thermal Power Station	902 ft	275 m	1988/2005/2012	India	Sonbhadra district	
Two chimneys of Kendal Power Station	902 ft	275 m	1988/1991	South Africa	Kendal	
Two chimneys of Lethabo Power Station	902 ft	275 m	1985/1988	South Africa	Vereeniging	
Two chimneys of Tutuka Power Station	902 ft	275 m	1985/1988	South Africa	Standerton	
Chimney of Ibbenbüren Power Station	902 ft	275 m	1985	Germany	Ibbenbüren, North Rhine-Westphalia	
Second chimney of Matla Power Station	902 ft	275 m	1984	South Africa	Kriel	One stack is a replacement. Original stack was demolished after partial collapse of internal structure during construction.
Chimney of Wilhelmshaven Power Station (E.ON)	902 ft	275 m	1976	Germany	Wilhelmshaven, Lower Saxony	
Chimney of Orhaneli Power Plant	902 ft	275 m	?	Turkey	Orhaneli	
Chimney of Killen Station	901 ft	274.5 m	1982	United States	Manchester, Ohio	In January 2017, DP&L announced plans to close Killen Station in an agreement with the Sierra Club and several unnamed parties. The closure was planned for mid-2018.
Chimney of Kammer Power Plant	901 ft	274.5 m	1978	United States	Moundsville, West Virginia	
Second chimney of TEC-2	899 ft	274 m	1989	Russia	Volgodonsk	
Chimney of Power Plant Łódź	899 ft	274 m	1977	Poland	Łódź	
Chimney of Talimarjan Power Plant	896 ft	273 m	1989	Uzbekistan	Nuristan, Qashqadaryo Province	
Chimney of Cardinal Power Plant	895 ft	272.8 m	1977	United States	Brilliant, Ohio	Unit 3
Chimney of Hrazdan Thermal Power Plant	886 ft	270 m	1990	Armenia	Hrazdan	Unit 5
Third chimney of Tbilisi GRES	886 ft	270 m	1990	Georgia	Gardabani	
Second chimney of TEC-1	886 ft	270 m	1987	Russia	Kurgan	
Three chimneys of Surgut-2 Power Station	896 ft	270 m	1985/1986/1991	Russia	Surgut	
Large chimney of Tobolskaya TEC	886 ft	270 m	1986	Russia	Tobolsk	also used as electricity pylon for two 220 kV-lines leaving Tobolskaya TEC
Fourth chimney of Krasnoyarskaya GRES-2	787 ft	270 m	1983	Russia	Zelenogorsk, Krasnoyarsk Krai	
Second chimney of Stavropolskaya GRES	886 ft	270 m	1983	Russia	Solnechnodolsk	
Chimney of MIM Smelter (MIM Smelter Stack)	886 ft	270 m	1978	Australia	Mount Isa, Queensland	
Third chimney of Karmanovskaya GRES	886 ft	270 m	1973	Russia	Energetik	
Chimney of Mělník Power Station	886 ft	270 m	1971	Czech Republic	Horní Počaply	
First chimney of Kostromskaya GRES	886 ft	270 m	1970	Russia	Volgorechensk	
First chimney of Compostilla II Power Station	886 ft	270 m	1972	Spain	Cubillos del Sil	
Chimneys of Shengtou Power Station 2	886 ft	270 m		China	Shuozhou	together with Chimney South of Suizhong Power Station the tallest chimneyd of China
Suizhong Power Station, Chimney South	886 ft	270 m		China	Qinhuangdao	together with chimneys of Shengtou Power Station 2 the tallest chimney of China
Chimney of Dětmarovice Power Station	882 ft	269 m	1975	Czech Republic	Dětmarovice	Planned conversion to nuclear but not before 2035
2nd Chimney of Dětmarovice Power Station	882 ft	269 m	1975	Czech Republic	Dětmarovice	Planned conversion to nuclear but not before 2035
Third chimney of Naberezhnochelninskaya TEC	869 ft	265 m	1976	Russia	Naberezhnye Chelny	
Chimney of Power Plant Kraków-Leg	853 ft	262 m	1970	Poland	Kraków	
Chimney of Siersza Power Station	853 ft	262 m	1970	Poland	Siersza	
Chimney of TEC-5	853 ft	260 m	1985	Russia	Novosibirsk	
Chimney of Loy Yang Power Station, Unit B	853 ft	260 m	1993	Australia	Traralgon	
First himney of Rybnik Power Station	853 ft	260 m	1972	Poland	Rybnik	
Chimney of Shawville Generating Station	850 ft	259 m	1976	United States	Shawville, Pennsylvania	
Chimney of R. E. Burger Power Plant	850 ft	259 m	1972	United States	Shadyside, Ohio	Demolished on 29 July 2016.
Two chimneys of W. H. Sammis Power Plant, Unit 5 + 6	850 ft	259 m	1967	United States	Stratton, Ohio	
Chimney of Drax Power Station	850 ft	259 m	1969	United Kingdom	Drax, North Yorkshire	Tallest industrial chimney in the UK.
Second chimney of TEC-4	848 ft	258.5 m	198?	Russia	Omsk	
Chimney of Robert W Scherer Power Plant New Units 3&4	847 ft	258 m	2010	United States	Juliette, Georgia	
Second chimney of Zapadno-Sibirskaya TEC	843 ft	257 m	198?	Russia	Novokuznetsk	
Chimney of Unit 6 of Bremen-Hafen Power Station	840 ft	256 m	1979	Germany	Bremen	
Chimney Hamburg-Port	840 ft	256 m	?	Germany	Hamburg	Demolished. During its demolition by explosives in April 2004, further damage occurred caused by miscalculation of debris trajectories.
Chimney of Pruszków Power Plant	830 ft	256 m	?	Poland	Moszna-Parcela, Pruszków	Power plant was never commissioned.
Second chimney of Kostromskaya GRES	838 ft	255.4 m	1972	Russia	Volgorechensk	
Two сhimneys of Loy Yang Power Station, Unit A	853 ft	255 m	1984/1988	Australia	Traralgon	
Chimney of Gen. J. M. Gavin Power Plant	830 ft	253 m	1994	United States	Cheshire, Ohio	
Two chimneys of Yates Power Plant	830 ft	253 m	1974	United States	Newnan, Georgia	One of the chimneys was demolished on 21 January 2017.
Second chimney of ASARCO El Paso Smelter	828 ft	252.5 m	1967	United States	El Paso, Texas	Very briefly the tallest chimney in the world. Demolished in April 2013.
Chimney of Aramon Power Plant	826.5 ft	252 m	1977	France	Aramon	
Chimney of ZETES-3 Power Station	827 ft	252 m	2016	Turkey	Çatalağzı, Zonguldak	Reinforced concrete chimney with twin steel flues, built by slipforming.
Two chimneys of Eesti Power Plant	825 ft	251.5 m	1973	Estonia	Narva	
Third chimney of Aksu GRES	825 ft	251.5 m	1973	Kazakhstan	Aksu	
New Chimney of Kuznetskaya TEC	823.5 ft	251 m	198?	Russia	Novokuznetsk	
Chimney of Hudbay Flin Flon Smelter	823.5 ft	251 m	1973	Canada	Flin Flon, Manitoba	No longer in operation after smelter was shut down in 2010
Second chimney of Volzhskaya TEC-1	823.5 ft	251 m	197?	Russia	Volzhsky	
Chimney of Esbjerg Power Station	821 ft	250.2 m	1992	Denmark	Esbjerg	
Two chimneys of Majuba Power Station	820 ft	250 m	1996/2000	South Africa	Volksrust	
Two chimneys of Orot Rabin	820 ft	250 m	1993	Israel	Hadera	No.1, No.2
Chimney of Nizhnevartovsk GRES	820 ft	250 m	1992	Russia	Izluchinsk	
Second chimney of Novo-Ziminskaya TEC	820 ft	250 m	1990	Russia	Zima	Never entered in service
Two chimneys of Rutenberg Power Station	820 ft	250 m	1990/2000	Israel	Ashkelon	
Two chimneys of Matimba Power Station	820 ft	250 m	1987/1990	South Africa	Ellisras	
Four chimneys of Taichung Power Plant	820 ft	250 m	1991/1992/1996/1997	Taiwan	Taichung	Tallest industrial chimney in Taiwan.
Two chimneys of Bayswater Power Station	820 ft	250 m	1985/1986	Australia	Hunter Valley	
Chimney of Mount Piper Power Station	820 ft	250 m	1993	Australia	Lithgow	
Second chimney of Voerde Power Station	820 ft	250 m	1982	Germany	Voerde, North Rhine-Westphalia	
Chimney South of Romag-Termo Power Plant	820 ft	250 m	1981	Romania	Halanga	
Chimney of Stráž pod Ralskem	820 ft	250 m	1979	Czech Republic	Stráž pod Ralskem	
TE Rijeka	820 ft	250 m	1978	Croatia	Kostrena	
Bakar Eurco Chimney TE Rijeka	820 ft	250 m	1978	Croatia	Bakar	Demolished in 2005.
Chimney of Grosskrotzenburg Power Station	820 ft	250 m	1992	Germany	Großkrotzenburg, Hesse	
Chimney of Lünen Power Station	820 ft	250 m	1984	Germany	Lünen, North Rhine-Westphalia	
Two chimneys of Altbach Power Station	820 ft	250 m	1985/1997	Germany	Altbach, Baden-Württemberg	
Chimneys of Heilbronn Power Station	820 ft	250 m	1986	Germany	Heilbronn, Baden-Württemberg	
Two chimneys of Duisburg-Schwelgern Sinterplant	820 ft	250 m	?	Germany	Duisburg, North Rhine-Westphalia	
Chimney of Fina Refinery of Duisburg	820 ft	250 m	1981	Germany	Duisburg–Neuenkamp, North Rhine-Westphalia	
Chimney of DK Recycling und Roheisen GmbH	820 ft	250 m	?	Germany	Duisburg-Hochfeld, North Rhine-Westphalia	
Chimney of Mehrum Power Station	820 ft	250 m	1979	Germany	Hohenhameln, Lower Saxony	
Chimney of AES Tisza 2 Power Plant	820 ft	250 m	1974	Hungary	Tiszaújváros	
Chimneys of Porto Tolle Power Station	820 ft	250 m	1977	Italy	Porto Tolle	
Two chimneys of Połaniec Power Station	820 ft	250 m	1979/1983	Poland	Połaniec	
Chimney of Katowice Sinterplant	820 ft	250 m	1975	Poland	Katowice	
Two chimneys of Dolna Odra Power Station	820 ft	250 m	1973/1976	Poland	Nowe Czarnowo	One 250 m (820 ft) chimney was demolished after construction of a smoke cleaning facility.
Chimney of Power Plant Opole	820 ft	250 m	1993	Poland	Opole	
Chimney of artificial fibre factory "WISKORD"	820 ft	250 m	1979	Poland	Szczecin	
Third chimney of TEC-2	820 ft	250 m	1986	Russia	Cheboksary	
Second chimney of Ust-Ilimskaya TEC	820 ft	250 m	1984	Russia	Ust-Ilimsk	
Chimney of Vilnius TEC-3	820 ft	250 m	1983	Lithuania	Vilnius	
Fourth chimney of Krasnoyarsk GRES-2	820 ft	250 m	1981	Russia	Zelenogorsk, Krasnoyarsk Krai	
Chimney of Novo-Sterlitamakskaya TEC	820 ft	250 m	1981	Russia	Sterlitamak	
Second chimney of TEC-3	820 ft	250 m	1980	Russia	Novocheboksarsk	
Third chimney of Iriklinskaya Power Plant	820 ft	250 m	1979	Russia	Energetik, Orenburg Oblast	
Two chimneys of TEC-2	820 ft	250 m	1978/1982	Russia	Nizhnekamsk	
Chimney of TEC-2	820 ft	250 m	1978	Russia	Lipetsk	
Third chimney of TEC-1	820 ft	250 m	1977	Russia	Nizhnekamsk	
Chimney of Cherepovetskaya GRES	820 ft	250 m	1976	Russia	Kaduy	
Fourth chimney of Troitskaya GRES	820 ft	250 m	1976	Russia	Troitsk, Chelyabinsk Oblast	
Two chimneys of Northern TEC	820 ft	250 m	1975/1980	Russia	Saint Petersburg	
First chimney of Stavropolskaya GRES	820 ft	250 m	1974	Russia	Solnechnodolsk	
Two chimneys of Naberezhnochelninskaya TEC	820 ft	250 m	1973/1976	Russia	Naberezhnye Chelny	No.1, No.2
Second chimney of Karmanovskaya GRES	820 ft	250 m	1973	Russia	Energetik	
Two chimneys of Reftinskaya GRES	820 ft	250 m	1972/1975	Russia	Reftinsky	No.2, No.3
Two chimneys of Kurakhove Power Station	820 ft	250 m	1972	Ukraine	Kurakhove	No.5, No.6
Three chimneys of Novocherkassk Power Plant	820 ft	250 m	1970/1971/1972	Russia	Novocherkassk	No.2, No.3, No.4
Two chimneys of TEC-2	820 ft	250 m	198?	Kazakhstan	Temirtau	Other sources gives 253m
Three chimneys of Lukoml power station	820 ft	250 m	1969/1971/1973	Belarus	Novolukoml	also used as electricity pylons for the 330 kV-lines from the power station to the switchyard
Third chimney of Konakovo Power Station	820 ft	250 m	1970	Russia	Konakovo	
Two chimneys of Elektrėnai Power Plant	820 ft	250 m	1968/1973	Lithuania	Elektrėnai	No.2, No.3, No.2 is used as electricity pylon for a 330 kV-line from the power station to the switchyard
Fourth chimney of Nazarovo power station	820 ft	250 m	1968	Russia	Nazarovo	
Two chimneys of Kashirskaya GRES	820 ft	250 m	1966/1983	Russia	Kashira	Briefly the tallest chimney in the world, also used as electricity pylons for a 220 kV-line from the power station to the switchyard
Chimney of TEC-27	819 ft	249.6 m	1992	Russia	Chelobityevo	
Chimney of Severstal Power Plant	817 ft	249 m	1985	Russia	Cherepovets	
Chimney of TEC-2	815 ft	248.5 m	1980	Russia	Ulyanovsk	
First chimney of ASARCO El Paso Smelter	814 ft	248 m	1965	United States	El Paso, Texas	Briefly the tallest chimney in the world. Possibly demolished.
Second chimney of TEC-23	811 ft	247.3 m	1980	Russia	Moscow	
First chimney of TEC-23	806 ft	245.6 m	1975	Russia	Moscow	
Chimney of Yates Power Plant	805 ft	245.4 m	1971/1973	United States	Newnan, Georgia	
Chimneys of Monroe Power Plant	801 ft	244.1 m	1974	United States	Monroe, Michigan	
Chimney of Grain Power Station	801 ft	244 m	1979	United Kingdom	Isle of Grain, Kent	Demolished on 7 September 2016, by explosives.
Two chimneys of Shawnee Fossil Plant	801 ft	244 m	1979/1980	United States	Paducah, Kentucky	
Two chimneys of Miami Fort Power Station	801 ft	244 m	1975/1978	United States	North Bend, Ohio	
Four chimneys of J.M. Stuart Station	801 ft	244 m	1970/1971/1972/1974	United States	Aberdeen, Ohio	
Third chimney of Paradise Fossil Plant	801 ft	244 m	1970	United States	Drakesboro, Kentucky	
Two chimneys of Homer City Generating Station	801 ft	244 m	1969	United States	Homer City, Pennsylvania	Demolished by explosives on 22 March 2025. Units 1&2
Two chimneys of Keystone Generating Station	801 ft	244 m	1967/68	United States	Shelocta, Pennsylvania	Units 1&2
Chimney of Bull Run Fossil Plant	801 ft	244 m	1967	United States	Oak Ridge, Tennessee	
Stack#1 of New Madrid Powerplant	800 ft	243.8 m	?	United States	New Madrid, Missouri	
Chimney of Marl-Chemiepark Power Station	791 ft	241 m	?	Germany	Marl, North Rhine-Westphalia	
Chimney of Scholven A Power Station	789 ft	240.5 m	?	Germany	Gelsenkirchen, North Rhine-Westphalia	
Chimney of Duslo Šaľa	788 ft	240.4 m	1992	Slovakia	Šaľa	
Small chimney of Tobolskaya TEC	787 ft	240 m	1980	Russia	Tobolsk	also used as electricity pylon for two 220 kV-lines leaving Tobolskaya TEC
Fifth chimney of Troitskaya GRES	787 ft	240 m	2013	Russia	Troitsk, Chelyabinsk Oblast	
Chimney of Minskaya TEC-5	787 ft	240 m	1992	Belarus	Rudensk	
Second chimney of Sosnovoborsk TEC	787 ft	240 m	1990	Russia	Sosnovoborsk, Krasnoyarsk Krai	
Chimney of Kharanorskaya Power Station	821 ft	240 m	1991	Russia	Yasnogorsk, Zabaykalsky Krai	
Two chimneys of Luohuang Power Station	787 ft	240 m	1989/2005	China	Chongqing	
Chimney of TEC-2	821 ft	240 m	1986	Russia	Tyumen	
Chimneys of Bexbach Power Station	787 ft	240 m	1983	Germany	Bexbach, Saarland	
Second chimney of TEC-3	787 ft	240 m	1983	Russia	Kazan	
Second chimney of Samarskaya TEC	787 ft	240 m	1972	Russia	Samara	
Chimneys of Le Havre coal power plant	787.4 ft	240 m	1969/1984	France	Le Havre, Haute Normandie	
Chimney of Allen S King Generating Station	786 ft	239.5 m	1968	United States	Bayport, Minnesota	
Third chimney of Novo-gorkovskaya TEC	781 ft	238 m	1988	Russia	Kstovo	
Fourth chimney of TEC-3	780 ft	237.3 m	198?	Russia	Omsk	
Three chimneys of Navajo Generating Station	775 ft	236.2 m	1997/1998/1999	United States	Page, Arizona	The three smokestacks were demolished on 18 December 2020.
Chimney of Mažeikių Nafta Power Plant	820 ft	236 m	1979	Lithuania	Mažeikiai	
Chimney of Inverkip Power Station	774 ft	236 m	1976	United Kingdom	Inverkip, Scotland	Demolished on 28 July 2013.
Chimney of Fyn Power Station	771 ft	235 m	1991	Denmark	Odense	
Chimney of Power Station Schwandorf	771 ft	235 m	?	Germany	Schwandorf, Bavaria	Demolished in 2005.
Chimney of Petrogal Sines	768 ft	234 m	?	Portugal	Sines	
Third chimney of Balakovo TEC	766 ft	233.5 m	1983	Russia	Balakovo	
Chimney Heating Power Station Karlsruhe	764 ft	233 m	1985	Germany	Karlsruhe, Baden-Württemberg	Block 7
Chimneys Weiher Power Station	761 ft	232 m	1976	Germany	Quierschied, Saarland	
Chimneys of Kashima Thermal power station	758 ft	231 m	1971	Japan	Ibaraki	
Chimney of E. C. Gaston Power Station	755 ft	230 m	2009	United States	Wilsonville, Alabama	
Chimney of W. C. Gorgas	755 ft	230 m	2007	United States	Parrish, Alabama	
Chimney of Callide Power Station, Unit 'C'	755 ft	230 m	2000	Australia	Callide	
Second chimney of TEC-3	755 ft	230 m	1980	Russia	Barnaul	
Chimney of Cheswick Power Station	755 ft	230 m	1970	United States	Springdale, Pennsylvania	Demolished in 2023.
Chimney of Castrop-Rauxel Power Station	755 ft	230 m	1966	Germany	Castrop-Rauxel, North Rhine-Westphalia	Demolished in 2008.
Third chimney of Voerde Power Station	755 ft	230 m	2005	Germany	Voerde, North Rhine-Westphalia	
Chimney of Power Plant Lubin	755 ft	230 m	?	Poland	Lubin	
Chimney of Šoštanj Power Station	755 ft	230 m	1977	Slovenia	Šoštanj	
Chimney Heating Power Station Karlsruhe	689 ft	230 m	2008	Germany	Karlsruhe, Baden-Württemberg	Block 8
Chimney of New Castle Power Plant	750 ft	228.6 m	1977	United States	New Castle, Pennsylvania	
Chimney of Heyden Power Station	745 ft	227 m	1987	Germany	Petershagen, North Rhine-Westphalia	
Chimneys of Heating Power Station Gera-Nord	738 ft	225 m	1984/1986	Germany	Gera, Thuringia	Demolished 2008–2010.
Chimney Power Station Jena	738 ft	225 m	1981	Germany	Jena, Thuringia	
Chimney of Power Plant Bielsko Biala	738 ft	225 m	1975	Poland	Czechowice-Dziedzice	
Chimney of Power Plant Kraków-Leg	738 ft	225 m	1970	Poland	Kraków	
Počerady Chimney	735 ft	224 m	?	Czech Republic	Počerady	
Kunčice Chimney	728 ft	222 m	?	Czech Republic	Kunčice	
Chimney of Power Plant Głogów	728 ft	222 m	?	Poland	Głogów	
Chimney of Asnæs Power Station	723 ft	220.1 m	1981	Denmark	Kalundborg	
Chimney of TEC-2	723 ft	220 m	1977	Russia	Astrakhan	
Chimney of Moneypoint power station	722 ft	220 m	1985	Ireland	Kilrush	Designed to have a height of 225 m (738 ft), but built to a height of 220 m (720 ft) after changes during construction. Tallest freestanding structure in Ireland.
Chimney of Cuno Power Station	787 ft	220 m	1982	Germany	Herdecke, North Rhine-Westphalia	
Chimney of Počerady Power Station	722 ft	220 m	1977	Czech Republic	Počerady	
Two chimneys of Trmice Power Plant	722 ft	220 m	?	Czech Republic	Trmice	
Chimney of Schilling Power Station	722 ft	220 m	1962	Germany	Stade, Lower Saxony	Tallest chimney in the world upon completion in 1962 until 1966. Demolished.
Chimney of Chita Power Station Units 1–4	722 ft	220 m	1966	Japan	Chita	
Chimney of Mittal Steel Ostrava	722 ft	220 m	?	Czech Republic	Ostrava	
Chimney of Power Plant Polkowice	722 ft	220 m	?	Poland	Polkowice	
Chimney of Power Plant Toruń	722 ft	220 m	?	Poland	Toruń	
Chimney of Sual Power Station	720 ft	220 m	?	Philippines	Sual	
Chimney of Nikola Tesla Power Station, Unit A	718 ft	220 m	1970	Serbia	Obrenovac	
Two chimneys of Cordemais Power Station	718 ft	220 m	1976/1983	France	Cordemais	
Two chimneys of Porcheville Power Station	718 ft	220 m	1968/1975	France	Porcheville	Stopped since 1 January 2017.
Chimneys of Morgantown Generating Station	718 ft	218.85 m	1970/1971	United States	Newburg, Maryland	
First Chimney of Voerde Power Station	715 ft	218 m	1970	Germany	Voerde, North Rhine-Westphalia	
Chimney of Teplárny Brno-sever	714 ft	217.5 m	1982	Czech Republic	Brno	Crooked chimney due to problem during erection in winter 1981.
Chimney of Pembroke Power Station	713 ft	217.3 m	1968	United Kingdom	Pembroke, Wales	Demolished on 25 November 2000.
Chimney of Shell Pernis	712 ft	216 m	1974	Netherlands	Rotterdam	
Chimney of Littlebrook Power Station, Unit 'D'	705 ft	215 m	1981	United Kingdom	Dartford, Kent	Demolished on 15 December 2019.
Three сhimneys of the Lamma Power Station	705 ft	215 m	1982	Hong Kong	Po Lo Tsui, Lamma Island, New Territories	
Chimney of Richard L. Hearn Thermal Generating Station	705 ft	214.9 m	1971	Canada	Toronto, Ontario	
Chimney of Intermountain Power Plant	701 ft	213.67 m	1987	United States	Delta, Utah	
First chimney of Matla Power Station	700 ft	213.5 m	1979	South Africa	Kriel	
Two сhimneys of J. H. Miller Power Station	700 ft	213.5 m	2010/2009	United States	West Jefferson, Alabama	Units 1&2 + Units 3&4
Chimney of Rush Island Power Station	700 ft	213.5 m	1975	United States	Festus, Missouri	
Two сhimneys of Lacygne Power Plant	700 ft	213.5 m	1973/1977	United States	Lacygne, Kansas	
Chimney of Iatan Power Plant	700 ft	213.5 m	1980	United States	Iatan, Missouri	
Chimney of Oswego Generating Station	700 ft	213.5 m	1980	United States	Oswego, New York	
Chimney of Nebraska City Power Station	700 ft	213.5 m	1978	United States	Nebraska City, Nebraska	
Chimney of Oswego Generating Station, Unit 5	700 ft	213.5 m	1976	United States	Oswego, New York	
Chimneys of Labadie Power Station	700 ft	213.5 m	1970/1972	United States	Labadie, Missouri	
Chimney of Alma Power Station	700 ft	213.5 m	1960	United States	Alma, Wisconsin	Demolished on 1 October 2018, by explosives
Chimney of Sibley Generating Station	700 ft	213.3 m	1967	United States	Sibley, Missouri	
Chimney of Kielce Power Station	699 ft	213 m	1992	Poland	Kielce	
Chimney of Tarong North Power Station	689 ft	210 m	2001	Australia	Tarong	
Chimney of Stanwell Power Station	689 ft	210 m	1993	Australia	Stanwell	
Chimney of Callide Power Station, Unit 'B'	689 ft	210 m	1988	Australia	Callide	
Chimney of Tarong Power Station	689 ft	210 m	1986	Australia	Tarong	
Chimney of Toshima Incinerator	689 ft	210 m	1999	Japan	Ikebukuro, Tokyo	
Chimney of Guangdong Yudean Jinghai Power Generation Station	689 ft	210 m	2007	China	Jieyang	
Chimney of Guangdong Red Bay Generation Powerplant	689 ft	210 m	2006	China	Shanwei	
Chimney of Zhanjiang Aoliyou Powerplant	689 ft	210 m	2005	China	Zhanjiang	
Chimney of Huaneng Shantou Powerplant	689 ft	210 m	1996	China	Shantou	
Chimney Power Station Moers-Meerbeck	689 ft	210 m	?	Germany	Moers–Meerbeck, North Rhine-Westphalia	Demolished early 1990s.
Chimney Power Station Dortmund-Derne	689 ft	210 m	?	Germany	Dortmund-Derne, North Rhine-Westphalia	
Chimney Heating Power Station Karlsruhe	689 ft	210 m	1978	Germany	Karlsruhe, Baden-Württemberg	Block 5
Main chimney of the MiRO refinery	689 ft	210 m	?	Germany	Karlsruhe, Baden-Württemberg	
Chimney of Gustav Knepper Power Station	689 ft	210 m	1971	Germany	Dortmund, North Rhine-Westphalia	
Chimney of CET Bacău	689 ft	210 m	1990	Romania	Bacău	
Chimney of Wesleyville Power Station	682 ft	208 m		Canada	Wesleyville, Ontario	Power plant idled, unused stack.
Two chimneys of Poolbeg Generating Station	680 ft	207.3 m	1970/1978	Ireland	Dublin	
Vřesová Chimney	676 ft	206 m	?	Czech Republic	Vřesová	
Chimney of Plant Hammond	675 ft	205.8 m	2008	United States	Coosa, Georgia	
Chimney of Plant Bowen Units 1&2	675 ft	205.8 m	2008	United States	Cartersville, Georgia	
Chimney of Plant Bowen Units 3&4	675 ft	205.8 m	2007	United States	Cartersville, Georgia	
Chimney of Hal B. Wansley Power Plant	675 ft	205.8 m	2007	United States	Roopville, Georgia	
Chimney of Zinifex Smelter (Zinifex Smelter Stack)	673 ft	205 m	?	Australia	Port Pirie	
Stahl- und Hartgusswerk Bösdorf	673 ft	205 m	?	Germany	Leipzig, Saxony	
Chimney of Ironbridge B Power Station	673 ft	205 m	1969	United Kingdom	Ironbridge, Shropshire	Demolished on 3 September 2021.
Chimney of Počerady Power Station	673 ft	205 m	?	Czech Republic	Počerady	
Chimney of Slovalco	669 ft	204 m	?	Slovakia	Žiar nad Hronom	
Chimney of Mondi Business Paper SCP	669 ft	204 m		Slovakia	Ružomberok	
Chimney of MVM Észak-Buda Power Station	666 ft	203 m	1974	Hungary	Budapest	
Chimney of Iru Thermal Power Plant	664 ft	202.4 m	1978	Estonia	Maardu	
Chimney of Savica Power Plant	663 ft	202 m	?	Croatia	Zagreb	
Chimney Power Station Franken II	663 ft	202 m	1963/1964	Germany	Erlangen, Bavaria	Demolished in 2001.
Chimney of Považská Bystrica Old Power Station	659 ft	201 m		Slovakia	Považská Bystrica	Demolished in 2016.
Křivenice Chimney	659 ft	201 m		Czech Republic	Křivenice	
Neratovice Chimney	659 ft	201 m		Czech Republic	Neratovice	
Chimney of Thermal Power Plant Frederick II	656 ft	200 m	?	Italy	Brindisi	
Chimney of Tresnjevka Power Plant	656 ft	200 m		Croatia	Zagreb	
Chimney of Amyntaio Power Station	656 ft	200 m	1987	Greece	Amyntaio	
Chimneys of Eraring Power Station	656 ft	200 m	1982/1983	Australia	Eraring	
Three chimneys of Manjung Coal Fired Power Plant	656 ft	200 m	2002/2015/2017	Malaysia	Manjung	Tallest chimneys in Malaysia.
Chimney of Simmering Power Station	656 ft	200 m	1990	Austria	Vienna	Unit 3
Chimney of TEC-3	659 ft	200 m	1979	Russia	Volgograd	
Chimney of Škoda Auto	656 ft	200 m		Czech Republic	Mladá Boleslav	
Chimney of Mělník Power Station	656 ft	200 m	1980	Czech Republic	Horní Počaply	
Chimney of Ledvice Power Station	656 ft	200 m	1969	Czech Republic	Ledvice	
Chimney of Počerady Power Station	656 ft	200 m		Czech Republic	Počerady	
Chimney of Spolana Neratovice	656 ft	200 m		Czech Republic	Neratovice	
Stadtwerketurm	656 ft	200 m	1967	Germany	Duisburg, North Rhine-Westphalia	
Chimney Power Station Mannheim-Neckar	656 ft	200 m	198?	Germany	Mannheim–Neckarau, Baden-Württemberg	
Chimney Ludwigshafen	656 ft	200 m		Germany	Ludwigshafen, Rhineland-Palatinate	Demolished in November 2002.
Chimneys of Bayer-Power Station Leverkusen	722 ft	200 m	?	Germany	Leverkusen, North Rhine-Westphalia	Some sources give 220 m (720 ft).
Chimney of Incineration Plant Essen-Karnap	656 ft	200 m	1987	Germany	Essen–Karnap, North Rhine-Westphalia	
Chimney Power Station Westfalen	656 ft	200 m	1989	Germany	Hamm–Schmehausen, North Rhine-Westphalia	
Chimney of Frimmersdorf Power Station, Unit P	656 ft	200 m	1966	Germany	Frimmersdorf, North Rhine-Westphalia	
Chimneys of Irsching Power Station	656 ft	200 m	1969/1974	Germany	Vohburg an der Donau	
Chimney Power Station Breitungen	656 ft	200 m	1986	Germany	Breitungen, Thuringia	Demolished in 2005.
Chimney of Schkopau Power Station	656 ft	200 m	1995	Germany	Schkopau, Saxony-Anhalt	
Chimney of Schwedt PCK-refinery	656 ft	200 m		Germany	Schwedt, Brandenburg	Demolished in 2003.
Chimney of Hekinan Power Plant, Units 1–3	656 ft	200 m	1990	Japan	Hekinan	
Chimney of Sakaide Power Plant, Units 2–4	656 ft	200 m	1971	Japan	Sakaide	
Saganoseki Smelter and Refinery Second Stack	656 ft	200 m	1972	Japan	Saganoseki, Ōita	
Chimney of Anan Power Plant	656 ft	200 m		Japan	Anan	
Chimney of Atsumi Power Plant	656 ft	200 m		Japan	Atsumi	
Chimney of Chita Daini Power Plant	656 ft	200 m		Japan	Chita	
Chimney of Chita Power Station Units 5–6	656 ft	200 m		Japan	Chita	
Chimney of New Plymouth Power Station	656 ft	200 m	1972	New Zealand	New Plymouth	
Chimney of Katowice Power Station	656 ft	200 m	?	Poland	Katowice	
Chimney of Power Plant Zabrze	656 ft	200 m	?	Poland	Zabrze	
Chimney of Power Station Kozienice	656 ft	200 m	?	Poland	Kozienice	
Chimney of Łagisza Power Station	656 ft	200 m	?	Poland	Będzin–Łagisza	
Chimney of Pątnów Power Station	656 ft	200 m	?	Poland	Pątnów	Demolished in 2008.
Chimney of Power Station Poznań-Karolin	656 ft	200 m	?	Poland	Poznań–Karolin	
Three chimneys of Siekierki Power Station	656 ft	200 m	?	Poland	Warsaw–Siekierki	Chimneys n°2, 3 and 4
Chimney of Gdańsk Power Station	656 ft	200 m		Poland	Gdańsk	
Chimney of Żerań Power Station	656 ft	200 m		Poland	Warsaw–Żerań	
Chimney of Sant Adrià de Besòs Power Station	656 ft	200 m	1976	Spain	Sant Adrià de Besòs	
Chimney of Strážske Chemko Power Station	656 ft	200 m		Slovakia	Strážske	
Chimney of Vojany Power Station, EVO 1	656 ft	200 m		Slovakia	Vojany	
Large Chimney of Krompachy Kovohuty Copper Smelter	656 ft	200 m		Slovakia	Krompachy	
Chimney of Power Station Vranov nad Topľou Bukóza Holding Works	656 ft	200 m		Slovakia	Vranov nad Topľou	
Chimney of Prunéřov Power Station	656 ft	200 m	1976	Czech Republic	Kadaň	Unit 1.
Chimney of Mělník Power Station III	656 ft	200 m		Czech Republic	Horní Počaply	
Manušice Chimney	656 ft	200 m		Czech Republic	Česká Lípa	Demolished ?
Chimney of Skalice u České Lípy	656 ft	200 m		Czech Republic	Skalice u České Lípy	Demolished?
Chimney of Candiota III Generating Station	656 ft	200 m	2010	Brazil	Candiota	
Chimney of Fiddlers Ferry Power Station	656 ft	200 m	1971	United Kingdom	Widnes, Cheshire	
Chimney of Eggborough Power Station	656 ft	200 m	1966	United Kingdom	Eggborough, North Yorkshire	Demolished on 24 July 2022.
Chimneys of West Burton A Power Station	656 ft	200 m	Original: 1966; Replacement: 2003	United Kingdom	West Burton, Nottinghamshire	Twin chimneys. Original stacks demolished in 2003.
Chimney of Gibson Generating Station	655 ft	199.7 m	2005	United States	Owensville, Indiana	
Chimney of Didcot A Power Station	654 ft	199.5 m	1968	United Kingdom	Didcot, Oxfordshire	Demolished on 9 February 2020.
Chimney of Ratcliffe-on-Soar Power Station	653 ft	199 m	1967	United Kingdom	Ratcliffe-on-Soar, Nottinghamshire	
Chimneys of Ferrybridge C Power Station	650 ft	198 m	1966	United Kingdom	Ferrybridge, West Yorkshire	Twin chimneys, demolished on 22 August 2021.
Chimney of Cottam Power Station	650 ft	198 m	1968	United Kingdom	Cottam, Nottinghamshire	Demolished on 20 March 2025.
Chimney of Kingsnorth Power Station	650 ft	198 m	1970	United Kingdom	Hoo St Werburgh, Kent	Demolished on 22 March 2018.
Chimney of Fawley Power Station	650 ft	198 m	1969	United Kingdom	Fawley, Hampshire	Demolished on 31 October 2021.
Chimney of Kilroot Power Station	650 ft	198 m	1981	United Kingdom	Carrickfergus, Northern Ireland	
Chimney of Consumers Energy B.C. Cobb Plant	650 ft	198 m	?	United States	Muskegon, Michigan	Ceased operations in 2016. It was completely demolished along with the B.C. Cobb plant in January 2020 after a gradual demolition process over two years.
Chimney of Nanticoke Generating Station Units 1–4	650 ft	198 m		Canada	Nanticoke, Ontario	Demolished on 28 February 2018, by explosives
Chimney of Nanticoke Generating Station Units 5–8	650 ft	198 m		Canada	Nanticoke, Ontario	Demolished on 28 February 2018, by explosives
Chimney of Lennox Generating Station Units 1–2	650 ft	198 m		Canada	Lennox County, Ontario	
Chimney of Lennox Generating Station Units 3–4	650 ft	198 m		Canada	Lennox County, Ontario	
Chimney of Thunder Bay Generating Station Units 3–4	650 ft	198 m		Canada	Thunder Bay, Ontario	Demolished on 9 September 2021 by explosives.
Port Kembla Copper Stack	650 ft	198 m	1965	Australia	Port Kembla	Demolished on 20 February 2014 by explosives.
Chimney of Tušimice Power Station	643 ft	196 m	1964	Czech Republic	Tušimice	Demolished on 27 November 2005 by explosives.
Chimney of Gibson Generating Station	626 ft	195.6 m	2006	United States	Owensville, Indiana	
Large Chimney of Žilina Heat Power Station	640 ft	195 m	1982	Slovakia	Žilina	
Copper Cliff Nickel Refinery smokestack	637 ft	194 m	1954	Canada	Sudbury, Ontario	Tallest chimney in the world upon completion.
Chimney of Jablonec nad Nisou	627 ft	191 m		Czech Republic	Jablonec nad Nisou	
Four chimneys of Northport Power Station	620 ft	190 m	1967	United States	Fort Salonga, New York	
Chimney of Tepláreň	620 ft	190 m		Slovakia	Zvolen	
Chimneys of Otto E. Eckert Power Plant	615 ft	187.5 m	1981	United States	Lansing, Michigan	
Lead Smelter Chimney of American Smelting and Refining Co	611"8" ft	186 m	1951	United States	El Paso, Texas	Briefly the tallest chimney in the world from 1951 to 1952. Demolished in April 2013.
Chimney of pl:Elektrociepłownia Wrocław	611 ft	186 m	1978	Poland	Wrocław, Poland	
Chimney of Doe Run primary lead smelter	610 ft	186 m	1968	United States	Glover, Missouri	Idle since 2003.
Amercentrale	607 ft	185 m	1980	Netherlands	Geertruidenberg	
Chimney of Ashbridges Bay Sewage Treatment Plant	607 ft	185 m	?	Canada	Toronto, Ontario	
Lead Smelter Chimney of American Smelting and Refining Co	606 ft	184.7 m	1937	United States	Selby, California	Tallest chimney in the world from 1937 to 1951. Demolished in 1972–73.
Chimney of Komořany Power Station	604 ft	184 m	1963	Czech Republic	Komořany u Mostu	
Chimney of Longannet Power Station	600 ft	183 m	1969	United Kingdom	Fife, Scotland	Demolished on 9 December 2021.
Chimney of Rugeley B Power Station	600 ft	183 m	Original: 1970; Replacement: 2009	United Kingdom	Rugeley, Staffordshire	Replacement chimney demolished on 24 January 2021.
Chimney of Plant Barry	600 ft	183 m	2009	United States	Bucks, Alabama	
Chimney of Brunner Island Power Plant	600 ft	183 m	2008	United States	York Haven, Pennsylvania	
Chimney of Coleson Cove Generating Station	600 ft	183 m	2004	Canada	Saint John, New Brunswick	
Chimney of Seward Power Plant	600 ft	183 m	1921	United States	Seward, Pennsylvania	1921 is the date the power plant was constructed. There is no references to indicate the current 600 ft (180 m) stack was built at that time and the plant itself has been reconstructed multiple times over its history. Furthermore, the stack is built of concrete, which was not known to have been used in chimney construction until the 1930s.
Two chimneys of Coleson Cove Generating Station	600 ft	183m		Canada	Saint John, New Brunswick	
Syncrude Mildred Lake Chimney	600 ft	183 m	1969	Canada	Mildred Lake, Alberta	
Two higher chimneys of Balti Power Plant	599 ft	182.6 m	1965	Estonia	Narva	
Chimney of Power Station Senoko III	597 ft	182 m	1976	Singapore	Singapore	
Sokolov Chimney	597 ft	182 m		Czech Republic	Sokolov	
Chomutov Chimney	594 ft	181 m		Czech Republic	Chomutov	
Chimney of Tychy CHP Power Plant	591 ft	180 m	1976	Poland	Tychy	
Third Chimney of Svetlogorsk TEC	591 ft	180 m	1991	Belarus	Svetlogorsk	
Chimney of Spalovna Malešice	591 ft	180 m	1996	Czech Republic	Malešice	
Chimney of Sezimovo Ústí	591 ft	180 m		Czech Republic	Sezimovo Ústí	
Chimney of Česká Lípa	591 ft	180 m		Czech Republic	Česká Lípa	
East chimney of the MiRO refinery	591 ft	180 m	?	Germany	Karlsruhe, Baden-Württemberg	
Chimney of Duck Creek Power Plant	588 ft	179.3 m	2008	United States	Canton, Illinois	
Praha Chimney	587 ft	179 m		Czech Republic	Prague	
Anaconda Smelter Stack	585 ft	178.3 m	1919	United States	Anaconda, Montana	Tallest brick chimney in the world.
Chimney of Monroe Power Plant	580 ft	176.8 m	2007	United States	Monroe, Michigan	
Chimney of Amercentrale	577 ft	176 m	1980	Netherlands	Geertruidenberg	
Chimney of EON-centrale Maasvlakte	574 ft	175 m	2010	Netherlands	Rotterdam	
Chimney of Vojany Power Station, EVO 2	574 ft	175 m	1974	Slovakia	Vojany	Height reduced from 300 m (980 ft) to 175 m (574 ft) in 1998.
Chimney of Ruston Copper Smelter	571 ft	174.0 m	1917	United States	Ruston, Washington	Owned by ASARCO. "[O]nce the world's tallest smokestack" Reduced to 562 ft (171 m) after an earthquake in 1937. Demolished on 17 January 1993.
Chimney of Agios Dimitrios Power Station	571 ft	174.0 m		Greece	Agios Dimitrios	
Chimney of Liquichimica Biosintesi	571 ft	174.0 m		Italy	Montebello Ionico	
Chimney of Kerncentrale Borssele	570 ft	173 m	1973	Netherlands	Borssele	
Two chimneys of Harding Street Station	565 ft	172 m	1973	United States	Indianapolis, Indiana	Owned by AES Indiana.
Plzeň Chimney	561 ft	171 m		Czech Republic	Plzeň	
Chimney of Peterhead Power Station	560 ft	170.6 m	1980	United Kingdom	Boddam, Scotland	
Chimneys of Blyth B Power Station	557 ft	170 m	1962	United Kingdom	Blyth, Northumberland	Twin chimneys, demolished on 7 December 2003.
Považská Bystrica Chimney	557 ft	170 m		Slovakia	Považská Bystrica	
Otrokovice Chimney	557 ft	170 m		Czech Republic	Otrokovice	
Lambton Generating Station Chimney 1	557 ft	170 m	1969	Canada	Corunna, Ontario	
Lambton Generating Station Chimney 2	557 ft	170 m	1969	Canada	Corunna, Ontario	
St. Lawrence Cement Chimney	556 ft	169.4 m	1956	Canada	Mississauga, Ontario	
Děčín Chimney	554 ft	169 m		Czech Republic	Děčín	
Chimneys of Tilbury B Power Station	551 ft	168 m	1968	United Kingdom	Tilbury, Essex	Twin chimneys, demolished on 28 September 2017.
Lambton Generating Station Chimney 3	550 ft	168 m		Canada	Corunna, Ontario	
Chimneys of Drakelow A Power Station	548 ft	167 m	1957	United Kingdom	Burton upon Trent, Staffordshire	Twin chimneys, demolished in 2005.
Kunčice Chimney	548 ft	167 m		Czech Republic	Kunčice	
La Oroya Smelter Chimney	548 ft	167 m		Peru	La Oroya	
Chimney of Tepláreň Martin	539 ft	165 m	1980	Slovakia	Martin	
Chimney of Electriciteitscentrale Gelderland	537 ft	164 m	1980	Netherlands	Nijmegen	
Štětí Chimney	535 ft	163 m		Czech Republic	Štětí	
Chimney of Kralupy nad Vlatvou	531 ft	162 m		Czech Republic	Kralupy nad Vltavou	
České Budějovice Chimney	531 ft	162 m		Czech Republic	České Budějovice	
Praha Chimney	531 ft	162 m		Czech Republic	Prague	
Kopřivnice Chimney	531 ft	162 m		Czech Republic	Kopřivnice	
Štúrovo Chimney	528 ft	161 m		Slovakia	Štúrovo	
Příbram Chimney	528 ft	161 m		Czech Republic	Příbram	
Chimney of Jablonec nad Nisou	528 ft	161 m		Czech Republic	Jablonec nad Nisou	
Snina Chimney	524 ft	160 m		Slovakia	Snina	
Chimney of Devínska Nová Ves	524 ft	160 m		Slovakia	Devínska Nová Ves	
Chimney of Suginami Incinerator	524 ft	160 m	1982	Japan	Suginami, Tokyo	
Chimney of Kralupy nad Vlatvou	524 ft	160 m		Czech Republic	Kralupy nad Vltavou	
Chimney of Býnina	524 ft	160 m	1960	Czech Republic	Valašské Meziříčí	
Chimney of Praha Heat Power Station	524 ft	160 m	1961	Czech Republic	Prague	
Chimney of Aberthaw B Power Station	524 ft	160 m	1971	United Kingdom	Vale of Glamorgan, Wales	
Chimney of Petrochema	524 ft	160 m	1989	Slovakia	Dubová	
Chimney of Leipzig-North Cogeneration Plant	512 ft	156 m	1929	Germany	Leipzig, Saxony	was at time of completion tallest chimney in Europe, demolished in 1995
Postřelmov Chimney	512 ft	156 m		Czech Republic	Postřelmov	
Štětí Chimney	508 ft	155 m		Czech Republic	Štětí	
Chimney of ASARCO	508.5 ft	155 m	1929	Mexico	Nueva Rosita	Chimney built of bricks.
The Big Stack	508 ft	154.8 m	1908	United States	Great Falls, Montana	Completed on 23 November 1908. Demolished on 18 September 1982.
Two chimneys of Moss Landing Power Plant	500 ft	153 m	1964	United States	Moss Landing, California	
Praha Chimney	500 ft	152 m		Czech Republic	Prague	
Chimneys of Cockenzie Power Station	500 ft	152 m	1966	United Kingdom	Cockenzie, Scotland	Twin chimneys, demolished on 26 September 2015.
INCO Nickel Smelter Chimney	500 ft	152 m	1929	Canada	Sudbury, Ontario	
INCO Copper Smelter Chimney	500 ft	152 m	1936	Canada	Sudbury, Ontario	
INCO Nickel Smelter Chimney	500 ft	152 m	1937	Canada	Port Colborne, Ontario	
INCO Thompson Smelter Chimney	500 ft	152 m	1958	Canada	Thompson, Manitoba	
Tema Volca Aluminium Smelter Chimney	500 ft	152 m		Ghana	Tema	
Ostrava Chimney	499 ft	152 m		Czech Republic	Ostrava	
Bridgeport Chimney	498 ft	152 m	1969	United States	Bridgeport, Connecticut	To be discontinued by 1 July 2021, the last coal fired power plant in Connecticut.
Litvínov Chimney	495 ft	151 m		Czech Republic	Litvínov	
Křivenice Chimney	495 ft	151 m		Czech Republic	Křivenice	
Paskov Chimney	495 ft	151 m		Czech Republic	Paskov	
Chimney of Bánovce nad Bebravou	495 ft	151 m		Slovakia	Bánovce nad Bebravou	
Chimney of Västerås Power Plant	494 ft	150.6 m	1963	Sweden	Västerås	
Chimney of Jaslovské Bohunice Power Station	492 ft	150 m		Slovakia	Jaslovské Bohunice	
Chimneys of Mochovce Nuclear Power Station	492 ft	150 m		Slovakia	Mochovce	
Chimneys of Huntly Power Station	492 ft	150 m		New Zealand	Huntly, New Zealand	
Chimney of Bali Refuse Incineration Plant	492 ft	150 m	1998	Taiwan	New Taipei	
Chimney of Volkswagen	492 ft	150 m		Slovakia	Bratislava	
Chimney of Novaky Power Plant-B, Units 1 + 2	492 ft	150 m	1963	Slovakia	Nováky	
Two chimneys of Senoko Incineration Plant	492 ft	150 m	1992	Singapore	Singapore	
Four Lower Chimneys of Balti Power Plant	492 ft	150 m	1959/1963	Estonia	Narva	Demolished 2005–2011
Příbram Chimney	492 ft	150 m		Czech Republic	Příbram	
Chimney of Beitou Refuse Incineration Plant	492 ft	150 m	2000	Taiwan	Taipei	Public observation deck at a height of 116 m (381 ft) and restaurant at a height of 120 m (390 ft)
Kladno Chimney	492 ft	150 m		Czech Republic	Kladno	
Chimney of Hranice Cement Works	492 ft	150 m		Czech Republic	Hranice	
Chimney of Mělník Power Station	492 ft	150 m		Czech Republic	Horní Počaply	
Chimney of Mittal Steel	492 ft	150 m	1986	Czech Republic	Kunčičky	
Přívoz Chimney	492 ft	150 m		Czech Republic	Přívoz	
Čelechovice Chimney	492 ft	150 m		Czech Republic	Čelechovice	
Neratovice Chimney	492 ft	150 m		Czech Republic	Neratovice	
Chimney of Skalice u České Lípy	492 ft	150 m		Czech Republic	Skalice u České Lípy	
Chimney of Dolní Jiřetín	492 ft	150 m		Czech Republic	Dolní Jiřetín	Under construction.
Chimney of Mondi Štětí	492 ft	150 m		Czech Republic	Štětí	
Lakvijaya Power Station Chimney No:1	492 ft	150 m	2010	Sri Lanka	Norochcholai	
Lakvijaya Power Station Chimney No:2	492 ft	150 m	2010	Sri Lanka	Norochcholai	
Lakvijaya Power Station Chimney No:3	492 ft	150 m	2010	Sri Lanka	Norochcholai	
Třeboradice Chimney	492 ft	150 m		Czech Republic	Třeboradice	
Radio City Tower	486 ft	148 m	1965	United Kingdom	Liverpool, Merseyside	Built as chimney for the heating system of a nearby mall.
Strakonice Chimney	486 ft	148 m		Czech Republic	Strakonice	
Chimney of Copper Smelting fundición de Cobre Industrial Minera México	919 ft	147m	1947	Mexico	San Luis Potosí	Chimney build it on ASARCO period
Chimney of Muzha Refuse Incineration Plant	482 ft	147 m	1991	Taiwan	Taipei	
Chimneys of Zouk Power Station	476 ft	145 m		Lebanon	Jounieh	
Zlín Chimney	469 ft	143 m		Czech Republic	Zlín	
Písek Chimney	466 ft	142 m		Czech Republic	Písek	
Opatovice Chimney	466 ft	142 m		Czech Republic	Opatovice	
Teplice Chimney	463 ft	141 m		Czech Republic	Teplice	
Křivenice Chimney	463 ft	141 m		Czech Republic	Křivenice	
Chimney of Michle Heat Power Station	463 ft	141 m		Czech Republic	Michle	
Reckitt's Chimney	460 ft	141m	1970s	United Kingdom	Kingston upon Hull, East Riding of Yorkshire	Not in use since 2007.
ZDA Chimney	459 ft	140 m	1967	Slovakia	Partizánske	
Myjava Chimney	459 ft	140 m		Slovakia	Myjava	
Halsbrücker Esse	459 ft	140 m	1889	Germany	Halsbrücke	Chimney built of bricks
Kladno K7 Stack	459 ft	140 m		Czech Republic	Kladno	
Nymburk Chimney	459 ft	140 m		Czech Republic	Nymburk	
DSM-Chimney	459 ft	140 m		Switzerland	Eiken	
Horní Počaply Chimney	459 ft	140 m		Czech Republic	Horní Počaply	
Chimney of Zlín Power Station	459 ft	140 m		Czech Republic	Zlín	
West chimney of the MiRO refinery	459 ft	140 m	?	Germany	Karlsruhe, Baden-Württemberg	
Port Dundas Townsend Chimney	454 ft	138.4 m	1859	United Kingdom	Glasgow, Scotland	Chimney built of bricks. Tallest in the world from 1859 to 1889. Demolished in 1964.
Three chimneys of Morro Bay Power Plant	450 ft	137.1 m	1955	United States	Morro Bay, California	
Chimneys of High Marnham Power Station	449 ft	137 m	1959	United Kingdom	Marnham, Nottinghamshire	Twin chimneys, demolished on 15 December 2004.
Trebišov Chimney	449 ft	137 m		Slovakia	Trebišov	
Liberec Chimney	436 ft	133 m		Czech Republic	Liberec	
Tennant's Stalk	435.5 ft	132.7 m	1842	United Kingdom	Glasgow, Scotland	Tallest in the world from 1842 to 1859. Destroyed by lightning in 1922.
Two chimneys of Port Jefferson Power Station	434 ft	132 m	1948	United States	Port Jefferson, New York	
Trenčín Chimney	433 ft	132 m		Slovakia	Trenčín	
Chimney of Nováky Power Station	430 ft	131 m		Slovakia	Zemianske Kostoľany	
Chimney of Vojany Power Station	430 ft	131 m		Slovakia	Vojany	
Litvínov Chimney	430 ft	131 m		Czech Republic	Litvínov	
Poštorná Chimney	430 ft	131 m		Czech Republic	Poštorná	
Novosedlice Chimney	427 ft	130 m		Czech Republic	Novosedlice	
Chimney of Komárno	430 ft	130 m	1981	Slovakia	Komárno	
Chimney of Hnúšťa	430 ft	130 m		Slovakia	Hnúšťa	
Chimney of Humenné	430 ft	130 m		Slovakia	Humenné	
Žiar nad Hronom Chimney	430 ft	130 m		Slovakia	Žiar nad Hronom	
Rohožník Chimney	430 ft	130 m		Slovakia	Rohožník	
Heleneholmsverket	427 ft	130 m	1991	Sweden	Malmö	
Cheminée du Front de Seine	427 ft	130 m	1973	France	Paris	
New Chimney of Borregaard Boilerhouse	427 ft	130 m	2008	Norway	Sarpsborg	
Adachi Incineration Plant Chimney	427 ft	130 m	2005	Japan	Tokyo	
Minato Incineration Plant Chimney	427 ft	130 m	1999	Japan	Tokyo	
Chinose Incineration Plant Chimney	427 ft	130 m	1996	Japan	Tokyo	
Koeltoren Amercentrale	427 ft	130 m	1952	Netherlands	Geertruidenberg	
Chimney of Otrokovice Heat Power Station	427 ft	130 m		Czech Republic	Otrokovice	
Komin Kotlowni	423 ft	129 m		Poland	Wałbrzych	
Milevsko Chimney	420 ft	128 m		Czech Republic	Milevsko	
Enstedværket Unit 2 Chimney	419 ft	127.7 m	1969	Denmark	Aabenraa	
Štětí Chimney	417 ft	127 m		Czech Republic	Štětí	
Two chimneys of Fort Howard Paper Mill	415 ft	126.5 m	Stack 10 – 1984, Stack 11 – 1992	United States	Green Bay, Wisconsin	
Two chimneys of Jaslovské Bohunice Power Station	413 ft	126 m		Slovakia	Jaslovské Bohunice	
Three chimneys of Ballylumford B Power Station	413 ft	126 m	1974	United Kingdom	Larne, Northern Ireland	
Čížkovice Chimney	413 ft	126 m		Czech Republic	Čížkovice	
Chimney of České Budějovice	413 ft	126 m		Czech Republic	České Budějovice	
Brno Chimney	413 ft	126 m		Czech Republic	Brno	
Přerov Heating Plant	413 ft	126 m		Czech Republic	Přerov	
Chimney of Rožnov pod Radhoštěm	413 ft	126 m		Czech Republic	Rožnov pod Radhoštěm	
New chimney of Akmenės Cementas	410 ft	125 m	2014	Lithuania	Naujoji Akmenė	
Polomka Chimney	410 ft	125 m		Slovakia	Polomka	
Chimney of Atherinolakkos Power Station	410 ft	125 m	2004	Greece	Goudouras	
Chimney of Bay of Biscay Power Plant	410 ft	125 m	2003	Spain	Zierbena	
Chimney of Šiauliai Power Plant	410 ft	125 m	1966	Lithuania	Šiauliai	
Chimney of Aqaba Power Plant Units 1+2	410 ft	125 m	1986	Jordan	Aqaba	
Chimney of Aqaba Power Plant Units 3+4	410 ft	125 m	1986	Jordan	Aqaba	
Chimney of Aqaba Power Plant Unit 5	410 ft	125 m	1998	Jordan	Aqaba	
Five chimneys of Aleppo Thermal Power Station	410 ft	125 m	1997	Syria	Aleppo	
Es Murterar Power Station Chimney	410 ft	125 m		Spain	Alcudia	
Kamin der Jura-Zement	410 ft	125 m		Switzerland	Möriken-Wildegg	
KWK Katowice Chimney 2	410 ft	125 m		Poland	Katowice	
Vřesová Chimney	410 ft	125 m		Czech Republic	Vřesová	
Krnov Chimney	410 ft	125 m		Czech Republic	Krnov	
Chimneys of Mustamäe Boiler House	410 ft	125 m	?	Estonia	Tallinn	

Japanese Steel Smokestacks This is a list of Japanese smokestacks built from large sections of steel pipe. The majority of tall steel chimneys in the world are located in Japan. Unlike other modern developed countries which use reinforced concrete to build tall chimneys, Japan has historically used steel until recently in smokestack construction.

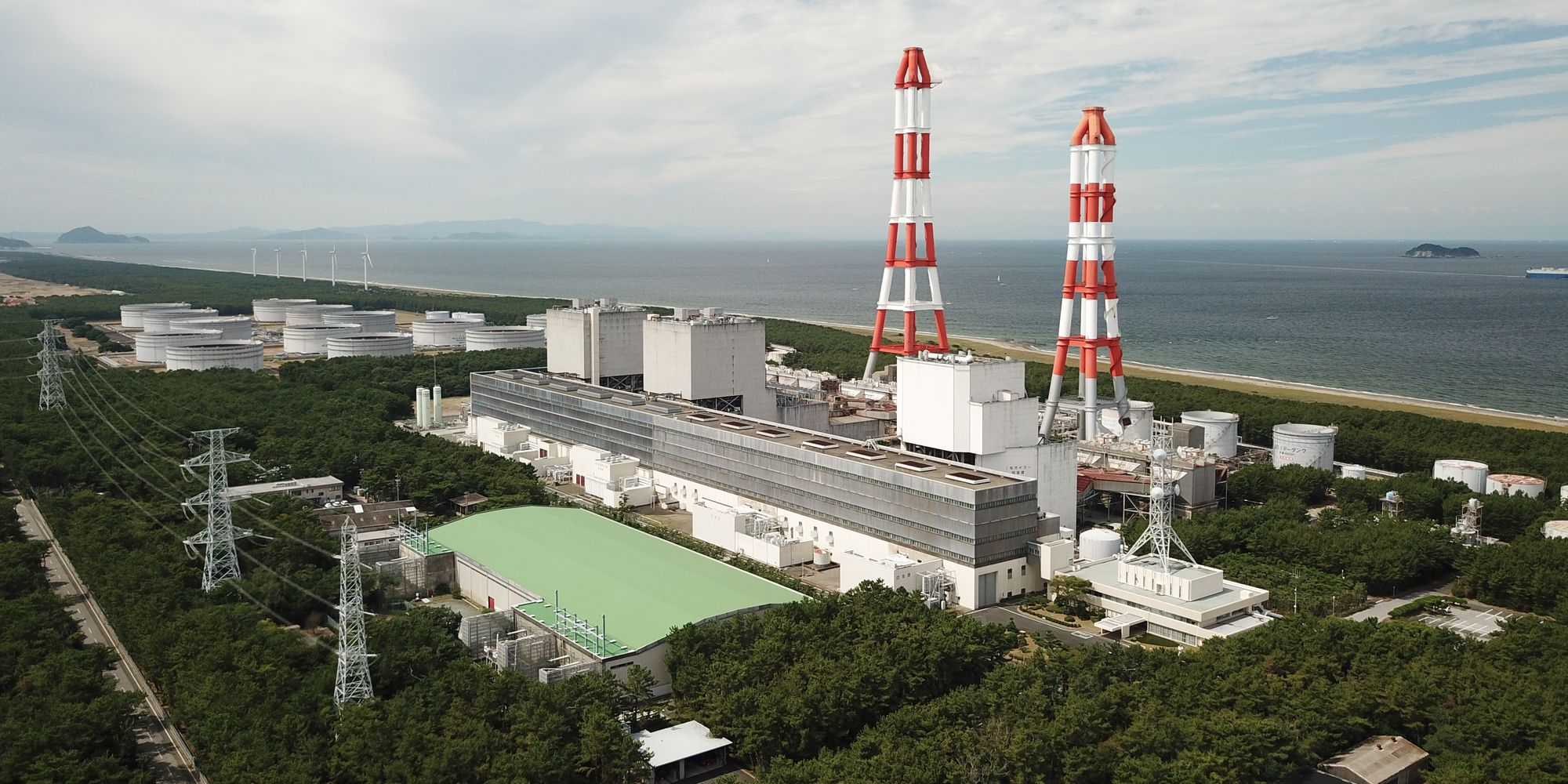
Two Japanese-style steel smokestacks located at the Atsumi Thermal Power Station

Tower	Year	Country	Town	Height m	Height ft	Remarks
Hsinta Power Plant		Taiwan	Kaohsiung	250 m	820 ft	2 chimneys
Mitsubishi Chemical Kashima Plant, stack 1 (pg.40)	2001	Japan	Kashima	230 m	755 ft	35°54′11″N 140°41′23″E
Chita Thermal Power Station, stack 1		Japan	Chita	220 m	722 ft	
Kimitsu Steel Works		Japan	Kimitsu	220 m	722 ft	
Kyushudenryoku Shinkokura Power Station, Stack 2		Japan	Kitakyushu	200 m	656 ft	
Sakaide Power Plant	1971	Japan	Sakaide	200 m	656 ft	
Hekinan Thermal Power Station, stack 1		Japan	Hekinan	200 m	656 ft	
Hekinan Thermal Power Station, stack 2		Japan	Hekinan	200 m	656 ft	
Atsumi Thermal Power Station		Japan	Atsumi	200 m	656 ft	
Chita Thermal Power Station, stack 2		Japan	Chita	200 m	656 ft	
Chita Daini Thermal Power Station		Japan	Chita	200 m	656 ft	
Anan Power Plant		Japan	Anan	200 m	656 ft	
Kawagoe Power Station, stack 1	1983	Japan	Kawagoe	200 m	656 ft	
Kawagoe Power Station, stack 2	1983	Japan	Kawagoe	200 m	656 ft	
Yokkaichi Power Station, stack 1		Japan	Yokkaichi	200 m	656 ft	
Yokkaichi Power Station, stack 2		Japan	Yokkaichi	200 m	656 ft	
Showa Yokkaichi Oil Plant		Japan	Yokkaichi	200 m	656 ft	
Mitsubishi Chemical Kashima Plant, stack 2		Japan	Kashima	197 m	646 ft	35°54′11″N 140°41′23″E
Mitsubishi Chemical Corporation Kurosaki Plant Site, Stack 1		Japan	Yahatanishi	190 m	624 ft	
Mie Plant of Mitsubishi Chemical		Japan	Yokkaichi	174 m	572 ft	
South Processing Factory, Yokosuka City		Japan	Yokosuka City	170 m	558 ft	
Mitsubishi Chemical Corporation Kurosaki Plant Site, Stack 2		Japan	Yahatanishi	170 m	558 ft	
Mitsubishi Chemical Kashima Plant, stack 3		Japan	Kashima	151 m	495 ft	35°54′11″N 140°41′23″E
Atsumi Thermal Power Station		Japan	Atsumi	150 m	492 ft	

== See also ==
- List of tallest freestanding structures
- List of tallest towers
- Solar power tower
- List of elevator test towers
- List of tallest cooling towers
- List of tallest oil platforms
- List of tallest industrial buildings
