= Energetik =

Energetik (Russian: Энергетик) is the name of several rural localities in Russia:

- Energetik, Republic of Bashkortostan, a former urban-type settlement in the Republic of Bashkortostan, Russia; since 2004—a rural locality (selo)
- Energetik, Orenburg Oblast, a former urban-type settlement in Orenburg Oblast, Russia; since 1999—a settlement
- Energetik, a former urban-type settlement in Vladimir Oblast, Russia; since 2006—part of the city of Vladimir
