= Mitchell Power Plant =

Coal-fired power station in West Virginia

- Country: United States
- Coordinates: 39°49′48″N 80°49′05″W

Power generation
- Nameplate capacity: 1,632.6 MW

External links
- Commons: Related media on Commons

Mitchell Power Plant is a large coal fired power station located on West Virginia Route 2 south of Moundsville, West Virginia, United States.

It has a 1,206-foot (368 m) tall chimney, which was built in 1971. This smokestack was once the tallest in the world for a short period of time. As of 2013 it is the sixth tallest, and still the tallest freestanding structure in the Southern United States.

A second 1,000 foot tall smokestack was built in 2006 to comply with emission regulations. On March 6, 2006, a fire broke out at the top of the new stack trapping several construction workers just as they were finishing the installation of the stack's fiberglass liner. Three of the workers were rescued by helicopter evacuation; a fourth worker at the site, Gerald Talbert, died from the accident.

== See also ==
- List of chimneys
- List of towers
- List of tallest freestanding structures in the world

Records
Preceded by Chimney of Lippendorf Power Station	World's tallest chimney 367.6 m (1206 ft); 1968-1971	Succeeded by Inco Superstack
