= Izvoru Bârzii =

- Commune
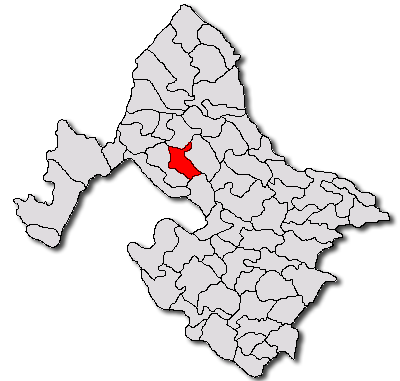
- Location in Mehedinți County

- Location in Romania
- Coordinates: 44°42′N 22°40′E
- Country: Romania
- County: Mehedinți
- Area: 68.8 km^{2} (26.6 sq mi)
- Population (2021-12-01): 2,481
  - Density: 36.1/km^{2} (93.4/sq mi)
- Time zone: UTC+02:00 (EET)
  - Summer (DST): UTC+03:00 (EEST)
- Vehicle reg.: MH

Izvoru Bârzii is a commune located in Mehedinți County, Oltenia, Romania. It is composed of seven villages: Balotești, Halânga, Izvoru Bârzii, Puținei, Răscolești, Schinteiești and Schitu Topolniței.

== Points of interest ==
- Romag-Termo Power Plant
