= Počerady Power Station =

Coal-fired power plant in the Czech Republic

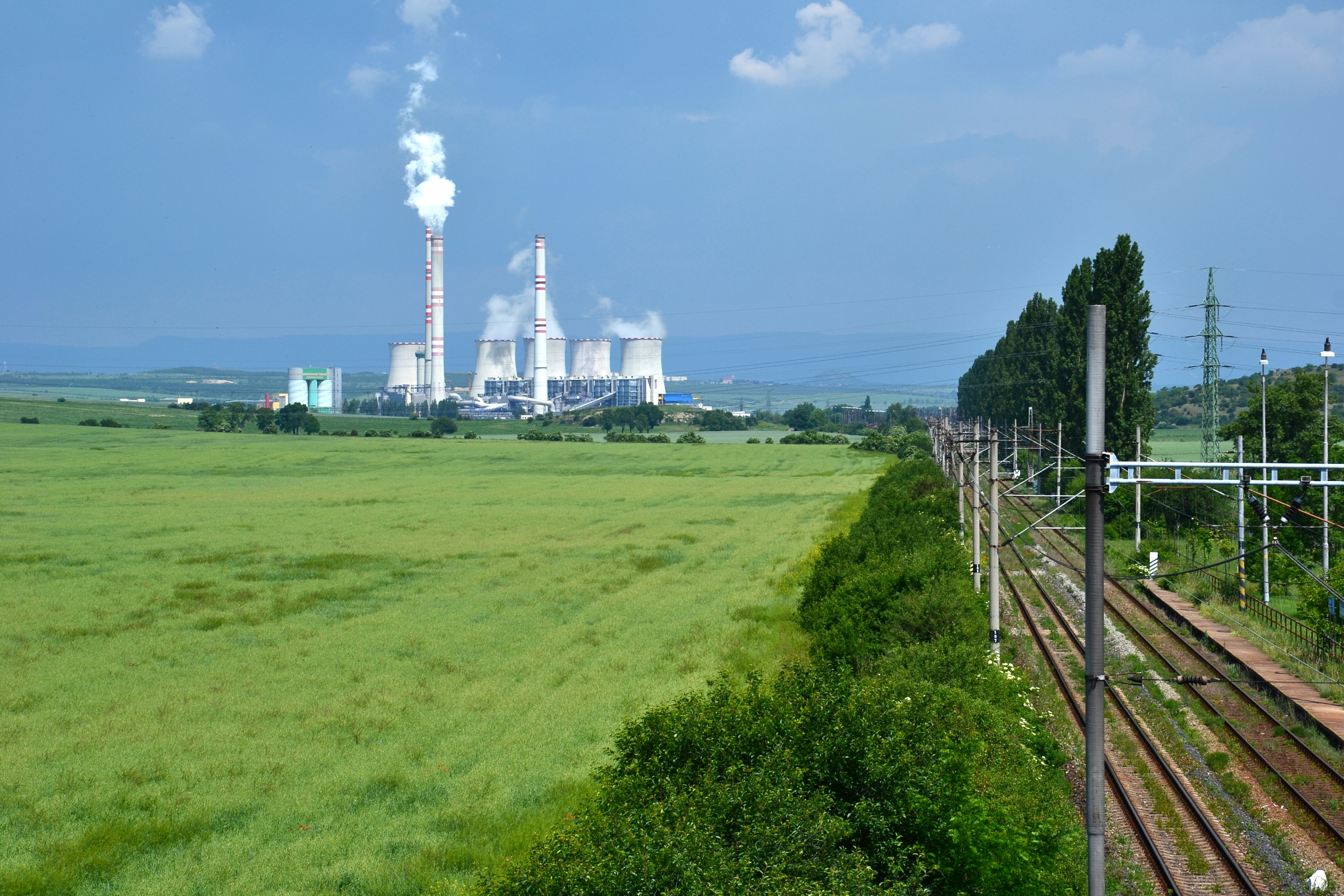
- Country: Czech Republic
- Location: Volevčice
- Coordinates: 50°26′N 13°41′E
- Status: Operational
- Construction began: 1964
- Commission date: 1970
- Owner: Vršanská uhelná
- Operator: Elektrárna Počerady

Thermal power station
- Primary fuel: Lignite

Power generation
- Nameplate capacity: 1,000 MW; 1,200 MW; 800 MW
- Annual net output: 4,952 GWh (2019)

External links
- Commons: Related media on Commons

The Počerady Power Station is a coal-fired power station in the Czech Republic. It is located in the municipality of Volevčice in the Ústí nad Labem Region, near the village of Počerady, from which it takes its name. It is operated by Vršanská uhelná, a part of the Sev.en AG group owned by Pavel Tykač.

The total installed capacity of the station is 5× 200 MW, with an annual electricity production of approximately 6000 GWh. Its coal supply comes from the nearby Vršany mine. The power station was commissioned between 1970 and 1977 and has undergone desulfurization and modernization.

== History ==
The construction of the power station occurred in two phases. In 1970 and 1971, four units (Počerady I) were commissioned. The construction led to the displacement and demolition of the village Třískolupy and the Mastný Dvůr farm. In 1977, two additional units (Počerady II) were commissioned. The first unit was decommissioned in 1994, and the remaining five units underwent a modernization program.

Desulfurization of two units was completed in 1994, and the remaining three were desulfurized in 1996. From 1997, the station transitioned from hydraulic ash and slag removal to a dry ash collection process, producing stabilizer material (a mix of fly ash, gypsum, slag, water, and 1–3% quicklime).

The total installed capacity of the plant is 1000 MW.

As of 2018, the station was the largest centralized source of pollution in the Czech Republic, emitting over 5.5 million tons of carbon dioxide annually.

Following reconstruction, the station met most updated emission limits but failed to comply with mercury limits. Operations were expected to cease in August 2021, though the operator could seek partial and temporary exceptions.

== Technical specifications ==
	Installed capacity	Commissioning date	Modernized and desulfurized	Notes
Počerady I	4×200 MW	1970–1971	1994–2000	Unit 1 dismantled in 1994
Počerady II	2×200 MW	1977	1994–2000	
Combined-cycle power station	2× gas turbines (284 MW each) + 1× steam turbine (270 MW), total 838 MW	c. 2013	–	New gas-fired power station

== Coal supply ==
The station's primary coal source is the nearby Vršany mine, owned by the same operator, Vršanská uhelná. Coal is transported via railway from the Most Basin surface mines. The station is supplied with water from the Ohře River.

== Sale to Pavel Tykač ==
In 2017, a dispute arose over whether the ČEZ energy company should sell the power station to a firm controlled by controversial businessman Pavel Tykač. The Supervisory Board of ČEZ initially postponed its decision before rejecting the sale in May 2017, despite the Vršanská uhelná offering 10 billion CZK. However, in 2019, ČEZ confirmed the sale to Sev.en AG.

In October 2020, the sale price was increased from 2 to 2.5 billion CZK, and the station was officially transferred in early 2021.

== Criticism ==
The power station has been criticized for its health and environmental impacts, including an estimated 111 premature deaths annually due to air pollution.

== Combined-cycle power station ==
In March 2010, ČEZ announced the construction of a combined-cycle power station at Počerady, with a planned capacity of 880 MW and 70% lower carbon dioxide emissions compared to coal. Operations began in April 2013.
