= Suizhong Power Station =

Power station in Suizhong, Liaoning, China

Suizhong Power Station 绥中电厂
- Country: People's Republic of China
- Location: Suizhong, Liaoning
- Coordinates: 40°04′46″N 120°00′29″E
- Status: Operational
- Commission date: 2000
- Owner: CSEC Guohua International Power Company

Thermal power station
- Primary fuel: Bituminous coal

Power generation
- Units operational: Phase 1: 2 × 800MW; Phase 2: 2 × 1,000MW
- Make and model: TAGMET; LMZ; Electrosila
- Nameplate capacity: 3,600 MW

The Suizhong Power Station (Chinese: 绥中电厂; pinyin: Suízhōng Diànchǎng), also known as Suizhong Power Plant, is a large coal-fired power station in Suizhong, China. The facility generates power by utilizing two units at 800 MW and two units at 1,000 MW, totalling the installed capacity to 3,600 MW.

== History ==
The first phase of the project of the Suizhong Power Station was started in 1993 and put into operation in 2000.

The second phase of the project of the plant began construction on April 30, 2008, and began formal operation in 2010. After the second phase was completed and put into operation, the total installed capacity of Suizhong Power Station reached 3,600MW, making it the largest thermal power plant in Northeast China.
