= Bielsko-Biała Power Plant =

Power station in Poland

Bielsko Biala Power Plant
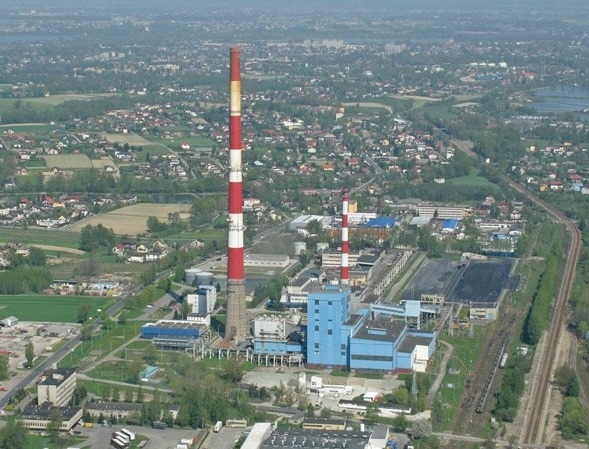
- Official name: Zespół Elektrociepłowni Bielsko-Biała
- Country: Poland
- Location: Czechowice-Dziedzice
- Coordinates: 49.812°N 19.052°E
- Status: Operational
- Construction began: 1960
- Owner: PKE

Thermal power station
- Primary fuel: Coal
- Secondary fuel: Fuel oil
- Tertiary fuel: Natural gas
- Cogeneration?: Yes

Power generation
- Units operational: 1 × 77 MW; 1 × 55 MW
- Units planned: 1 × 50 MW & 150 MWt
- Nameplate capacity: 132 MW

The Bielsko-Biała Power Plant is a complex of coal-fired combined heat and power plants at Czechowice-Dziedzice near Bielsko-Biała, Poland. It has two principal flue gas stacks, 100 metres (330 ft) and 225 metres (738 ft) high, the latter of which is one of the tallest free standing structures in Poland. The complex is operated by Południowy Koncern Energetyczny, a subsidiary of the Tauron Group.

== History ==
The first plant (EC1) at Bielsko Biala was built in 1960–1973. The necessity of building this power station was caused when Bielsko and Czechowice formed a big industrial center which required more energy. The second power plant (EC2) was built in 1975–1997 to supply energy for the Fabryka Samochodów Małolitrażowych car factory and residential housing estates. In 2009, it was announced that Tauron Groupis planning to build a new generation unit with power capacity of 50 MW and thermal capacity of 150 MWt.

== Specifications ==
The first plant has four boilers and consists of three turbine sets. It has installed power capacity of 77 MW and installed thermal capacity of 275 MJ/s. The second plant has a heating unit with the circulating fluidized bed boiler and two heating steam-oil boilers. It has installed power capacity of 55 MW and installed thermal capacity of 172 MJ/s.

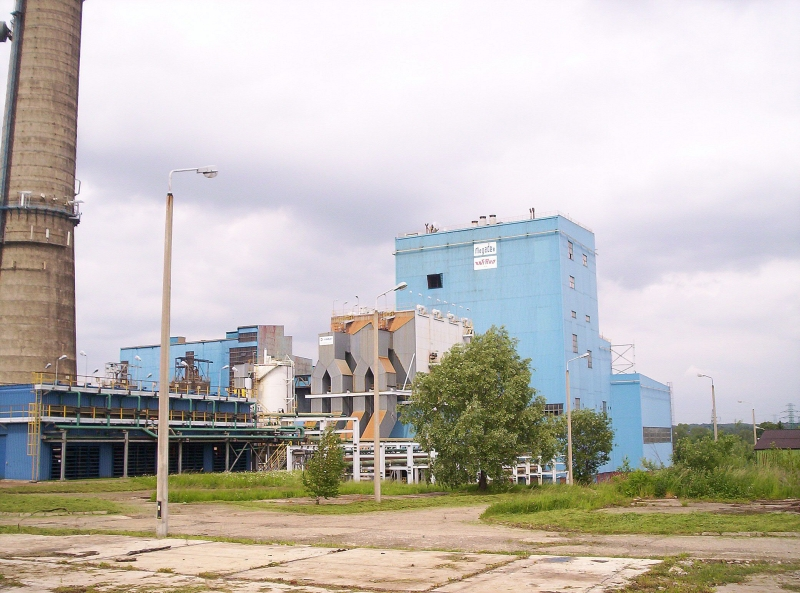
Czechowice-Dziedzice Plant

Smaller stack, 100 meters
