= Aqaba Thermal Power Plant =

Aqaba Thermal Power Station
- Country: Jordan
- Coordinates: 29°22′40″N 34°58′22″E
- Status: Operational
- Commission date: 1986
- Owner: Central Electricity Generating Company

Thermal power station
- Primary fuel: Natural gas
- Secondary fuel: Fuel oil

Power generation
- Units operational: 5 x 130 MW; 2 x 3 MW
- Nameplate capacity: 656 MW
- Annual net output: 1,771,638.53 MW h (2017)

The Aqaba Thermal Power Station is the largest power station in Jordan. It has a total generation capacity of 656 MW, which consists of five steam turbines units (5 x 130 MW), and two hydraulic turbines (2 x 3 MW). The power station is fueled by natural gas and by fuel oil. It is operated by the Central Electricity Generating Company of Jordan.

The Aqaba Thermal Power Station was established in 1986 as an oil-fueled power station. After construction of the Arab Gas Pipeline, the power station was switched to use natural gas.
