= Čelechovice =

- Municipality
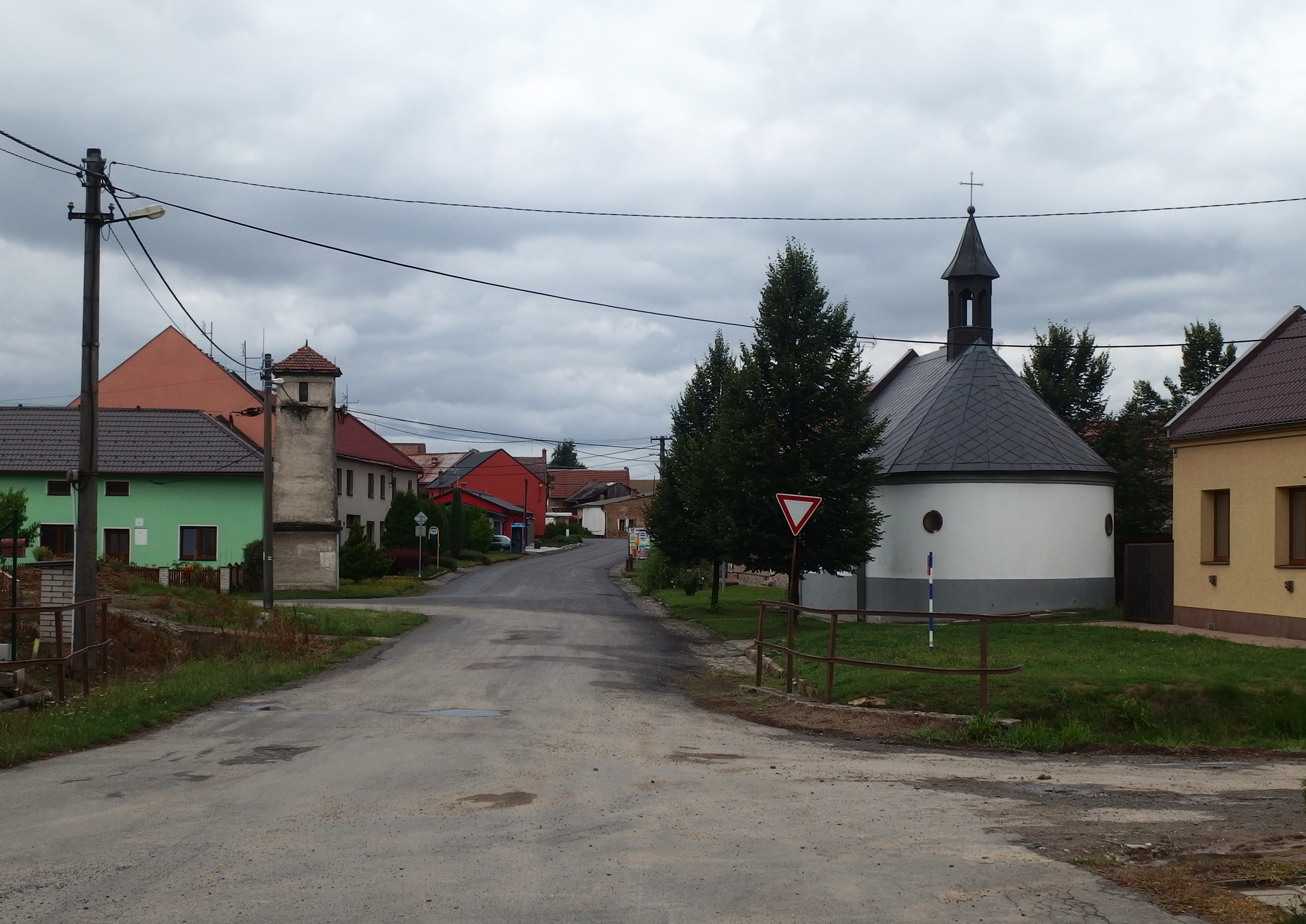
- Centre of Čelechovice

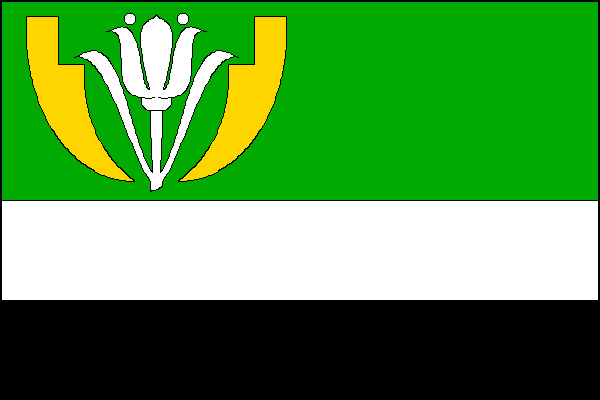
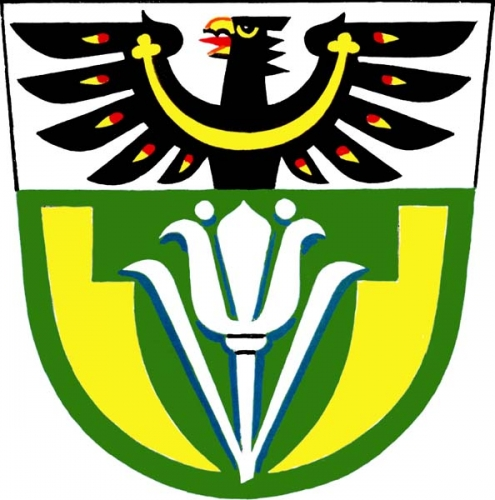
- Flag Coat of arms

- Location in the Czech Republic
- Coordinates: 49°30′36″N 17°22′20″E
- Country: Czech Republic
- Region: Olomouc
- District: Přerov
- First mentioned: 1254

Area
  - Total: 2.13 km^{2} (0.82 sq mi)
- Elevation: 237 m (778 ft)

Population (2026-01-01)
  - Total: 131
  - Density: 61.5/km^{2} (159/sq mi)
- Time zone: UTC+1 (CET)
  - Summer (DST): UTC+2 (CEST)
- Postal code: 751 03
- Website: www.celechovice.cz

Čelechovice is a municipality and village in Přerov District in the Olomouc Region of the Czech Republic. It has about 100 inhabitants.

Čelechovice lies approximately 9 kilometres (6 mi) north-west of Přerov, 13 km (8 mi) south-east of Olomouc, and 222 km (138 mi) east of Prague.

== Demographics ==
Historical population
Year	Pop.	±%
1869	147	—
1880	152	+3.4%
1890	153	+0.7%
1900	156	+2.0%
1910	156	+0.0%
1921	185	+18.6%
1930	170	−8.1%
1950	144	−15.3%
1961	134	−6.9%
1970	107	−20.1%
1980	94	−12.1%
1991	99	+5.3%
2001	95	−4.0%
2011	118	+24.2%
2021	130	+10.2%
Source: Censuses
