= Esbjerg Power Station =

Coal-fired power station in Esbjerg, Denmark

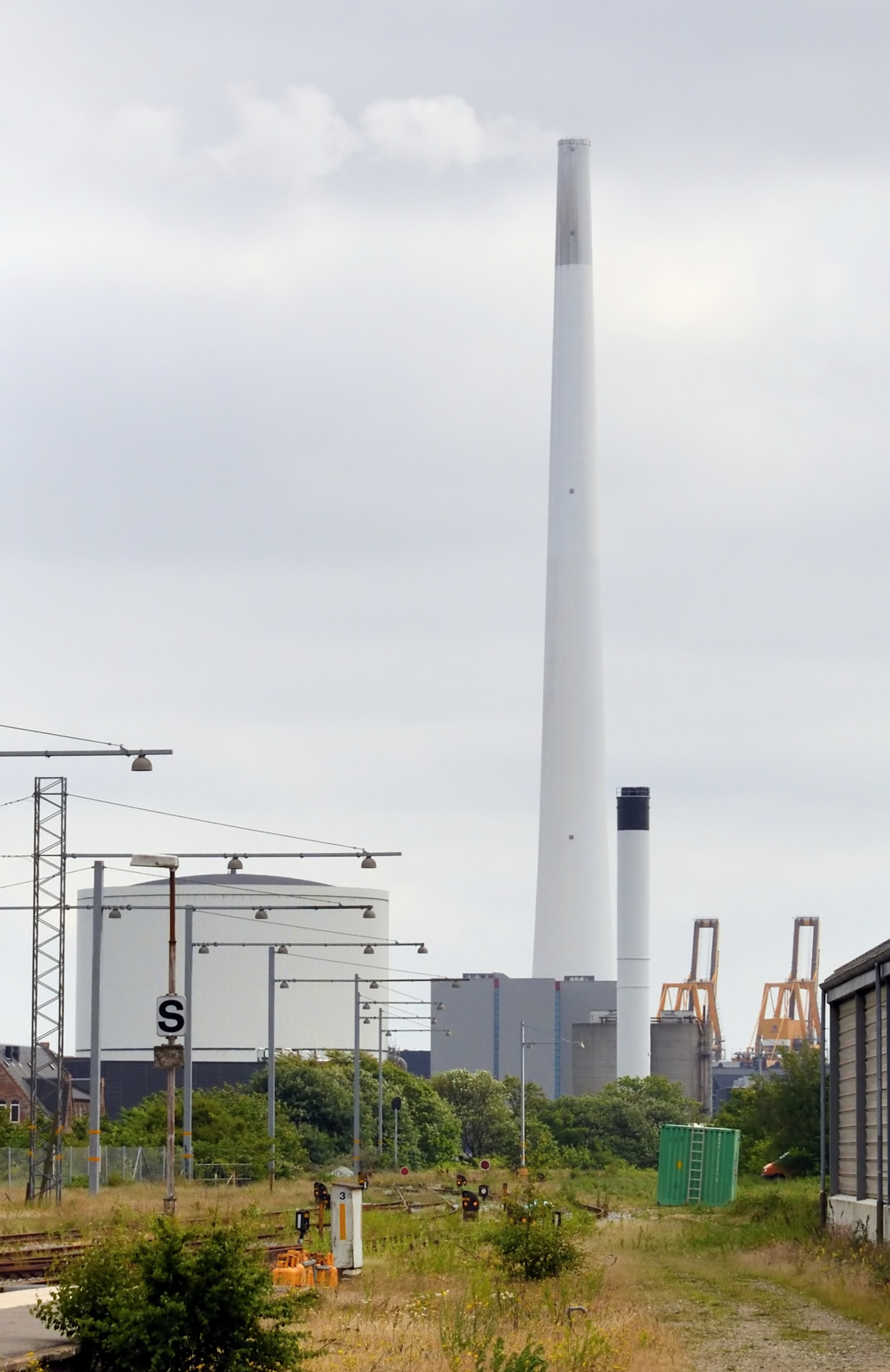
- Esbjerg Power Station with chimney
- Country: Denmark
- Location: Esbjerg
- Coordinates: 55°27′16.5″N 8°27′19.1″E
- Status: Operational
- Commission date: 1992
- Decommission date: 31 August 2024
- Owner: Ørsted
- Operator: Ørsted

Thermal power station
- Primary fuel: Coal

Power generation
- Nameplate capacity: 378 MW
- Annual net output: 2,405 GWh (electricity 2006); 2,559 TJ (heat 2006)

External links
- Commons: Related media on Commons

Esbjerg Power Station is a decommissioned coal-fired power station at Esbjerg, Denmark. The power station had a generation capacity of 378 MW. It is owned by Ørsted. Its chimney is with a height of 250.24 metres (821.0 ft) the tallest chimney in Scandinavia. In 2004 a facility for removing NOx was added to the plant.

Esbjerg Power Station produced 2,405 GWh and 2,559 TJ heat per year and has approximately 100 employees.

In October 2022, due to energy security concerns in light of the Russian invasion of Ukraine, the Danish authorities ordered Ørsted to extend the life of the plant's Unit 3. The company said that they remain committed to their goal of reaching carbon neutrality by 2025.

The plant closed on 31 August 2024.

== See also ==
- List of power stations in Denmark
