= Nazarovo Power Station =

Coal-fired power plant in Nazarovo, Krasnoyarsk Krai, Russia

Nazarovo power station
- Official name: Назаровская ГРЭС
- Country: Russia
- Location: Nazarovo
- Coordinates: 56°02′14″N 90°20′51″E
- Status: Operational
- Construction began: 1955
- Commission date: 1961
- Owner: Yenisei TGK (TGK-13)

Thermal power station
- Primary fuel: Lignite (open pit mine)

Power generation
- Units operational: 6 x 152 MW; 1 x 401 MW
- Make and model: Electrotyazhmash; Electrosila
- Nameplate capacity: 1,313 MW

External links
- Website: sibgenco.ru/about/company/generation/nazarovskaya-gres/

Nazarovo power station (Russian: Назаровская ГРЭС, Nazarovskaya GRES) is a coal-fired power plant with an electrical power output of 1,210 MW near to town of Nazarovo in Krasnoyarsk Krai, Russia. Station was commissioned for exploitation in 1961 and reached its current capacity in 2007. The ecological modernisation program started in early 2000 to ease down the influence of its work on river Chulym. The Nazarovo power station uses lignite mined as close as 5 km away in a coal pit with the same name. The power station is operated by Yenisei TGK (TGK-13).

== See also ==
- List of power stations in Russia
