= Shengtou Power Station =

Chinese coal-fired power station

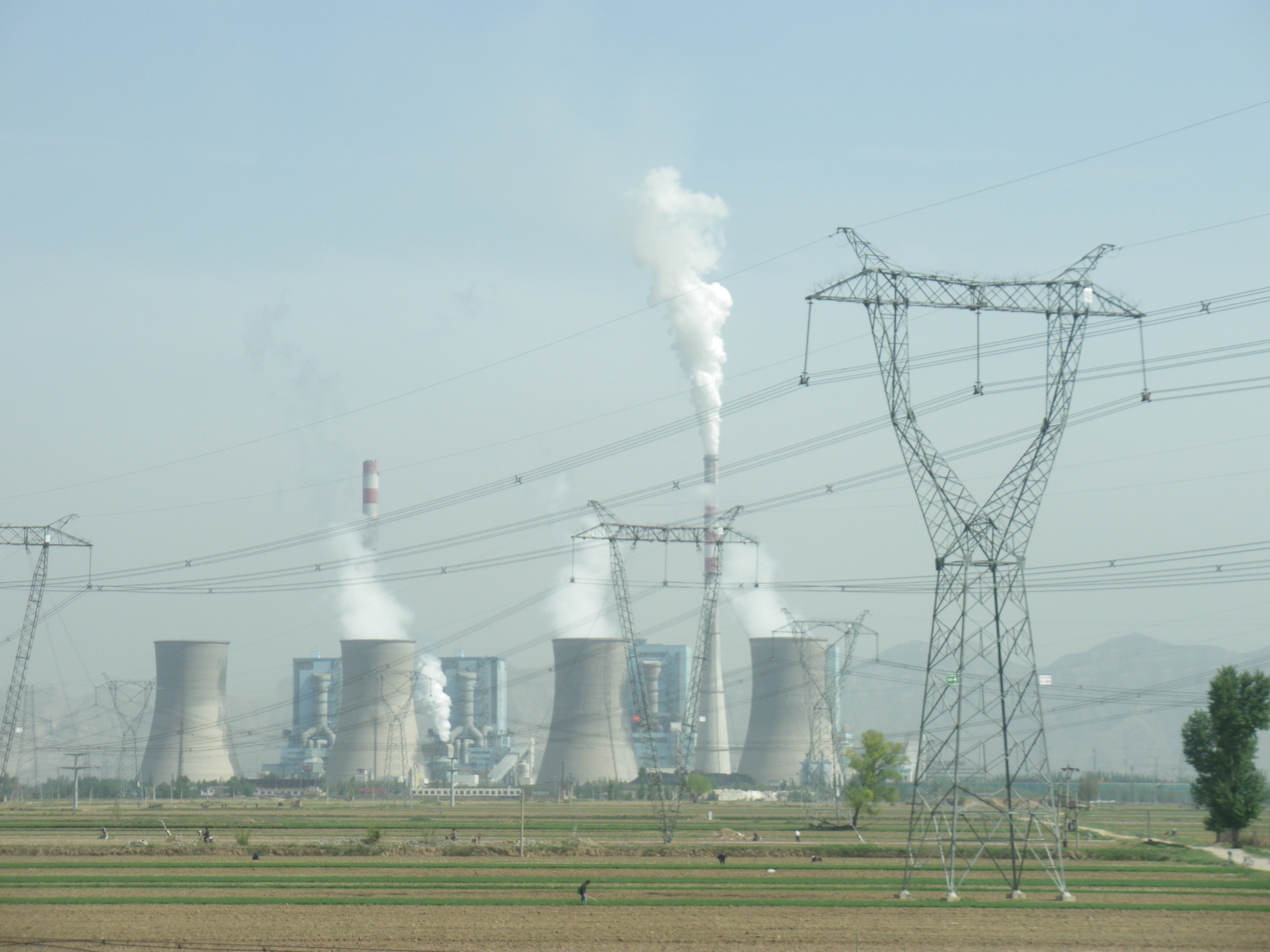
- Country: China
- Location: Shanxi Province
- Coordinates: 39°21′56″N 112°31′59″E
- Status: Operational
- Commission date: 1977-1987 (Units 1-8) 2013 (Units 9 & 10), 2022 (Units 11 & 12)
- Owners: State Power Investment Corporation (80%), ChinaCoal (20%)

Thermal power station
- Primary fuel: Bituminous Coal
- Turbine technology: Supercritical (Units 9 & 10); Ultra-Supercritical (Units 11 & 12)
- Chimneys: 2
- Cooling towers: 4
- Cooling source: Natural Draft Cooling Towers

Power generation
- Units decommissioned: 8 x 160MW
- Nameplate capacity: 3,320 MW

Shengtou Power Station or Shentou power station is a large coal-fired power station in China.

The plant was initially owned by China Power Investment Corporation (CPI). The first eight units, with a total capacity of 1,300 MW, were commissioned between 1977-1987. Units 9-10, with a 1,320 MW capacity, were brought online in 2013. The first eight units were retired one year later in 2014.

The station runs on bituminous coal using supercritical and ultra supercritical boiler technology across its 4 units. It has a total capacity of 3,320 MW (Units 9 & 10: 660 MW; Units 11 & 12: 1,000 MW)

== New units ==
CPI (now State Power Investment Corporation) had planned to build two additional coal-fired units at the existing power station, units 11-12, with a total planned capacity of 2,000 MW. The new units were scheduled to be completed in 2016, However, construction permissions weren't granted until January 2016, and construction finally began in May 2016. In July 2017 whilst construction was progressing, The Chinese Government issued the "Guideline of Supply-Side Reform of the Coal Power Bubble". The publication included a draft list which slowed down or halted 185 coal-burning units across 21 provinces, totaling 107 GW. 114 coal units (65 GW) are ordered to slow down the construction progress during 2017 to 2020, and are not allowed to connect to the grid in 2017. Shengtou was subject to this and construction was halted.

In September 2017, negotiations allowed for the new units to be postponed rather than permanently halted. Then on 28 March 2019, the construction on the two units resumed and they were completed in January 2022 and June 2022 respectively.

== See also ==
- List of coal power stations
