= Stadtwerketurm =

Chimney in Duisburg

Coordinates: 51°25′47″N 6°45′11″E

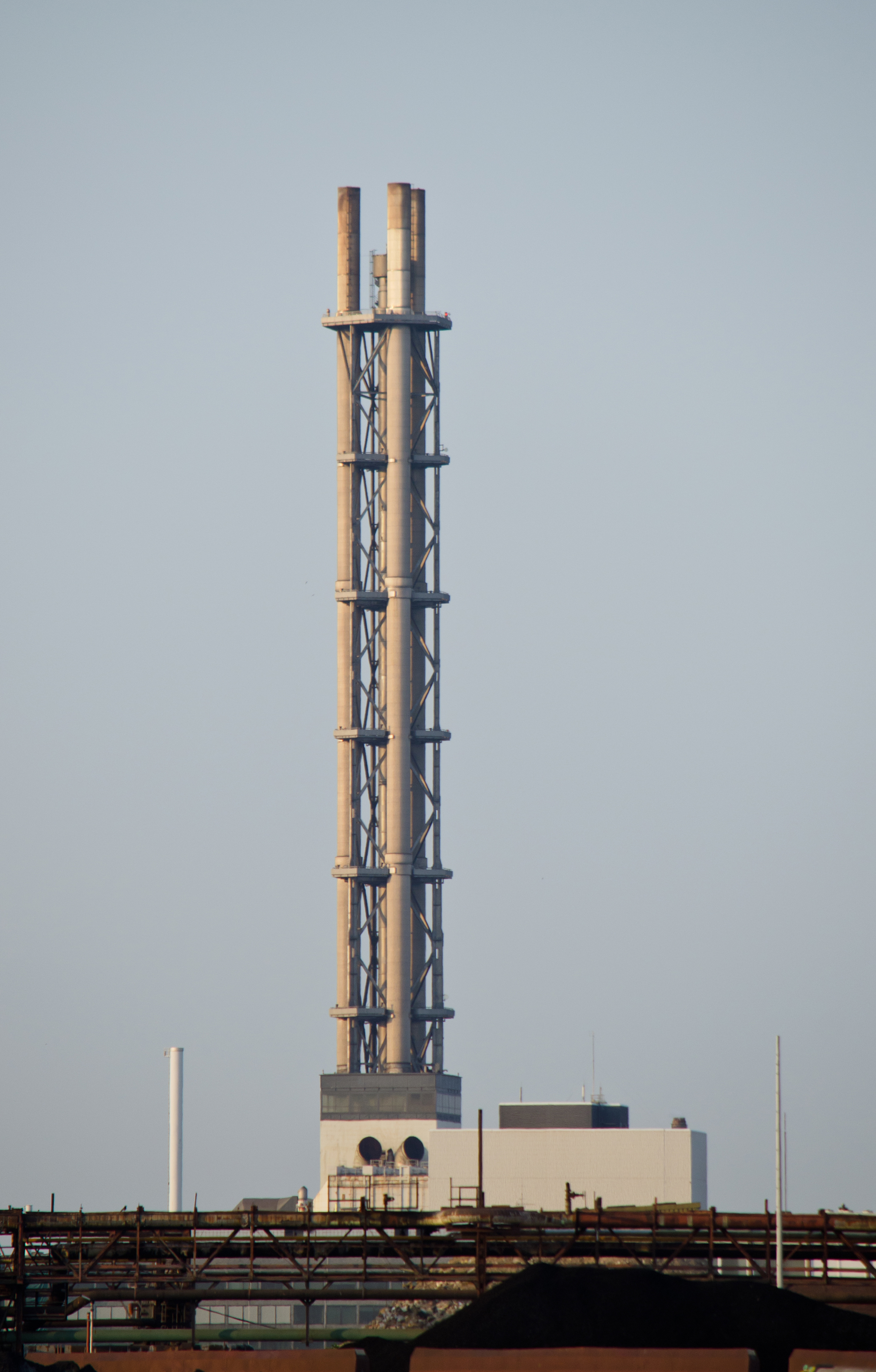
Stadtwerketurm.

Stadtwerketurm is a chimney of Duisburg. It was built in 1966–67 and consists of four tubes. One of these tubes contains an elevator, the others are used for smoke guiding. It Stands at least more than 7 metres tall.
