= Ensted Power Station =

Power station in Aabenraa, Denmark

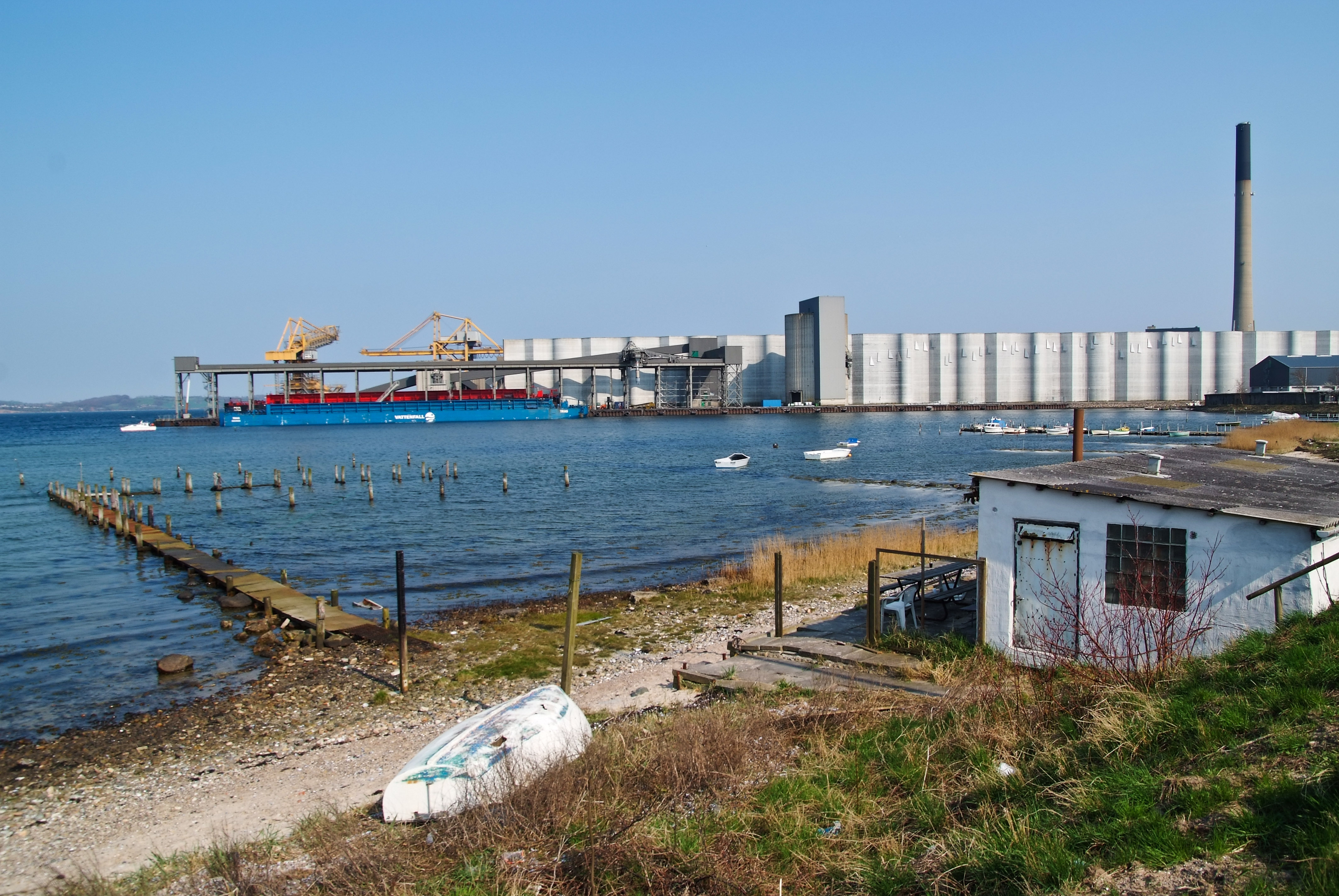
- Country: Denmark
- Location: Aabenraa
- Coordinates: 55°01′14.5″N 9°26′31.5″E
- Status: Closed
- Commission date: 1979
- Decommission date: 30 October 2013
- Owner: DONG Energy
- Operator: Ørsted

Thermal power station
- Primary fuel: Coal
- Tertiary fuel: Biomass
- Cogeneration?: Yes

Power generation
- Nameplate capacity: 626 MW
- Annual net output: 2,782 GWh (electricity 2006); 968 TJ (district heating 2006)

External links
- Commons: Related media on Commons

The Ensted Power Station (also known as the Aabenraa Power Station) (Danish: Enstedværket) was a thermal power plant in Aabenraa, Denmark. The power station was fueled by coal, straw and woodchips. It is operated by DONG Energy.

The power station had two units, which went in service in 1969 and 1977. The older unit, which was in 1997 transformed in a combined gas- and steam-turbine plant, has a total height from 127.7 metres (419 ft) with its chimney on the roof. The chimney of the other unit is 180.7 metres (593 ft) tall. Coal is delivered to the power station by ship. The harbour of the power plant is with a depth of 18 metres (59 ft) the deepest of Denmark.

It was permanently closed in 2013 and demolished in 2019.

== See also ==
- List of power stations in Denmark
