= Rybnik Power Station =

Coal power plant in Rybnik, Poland

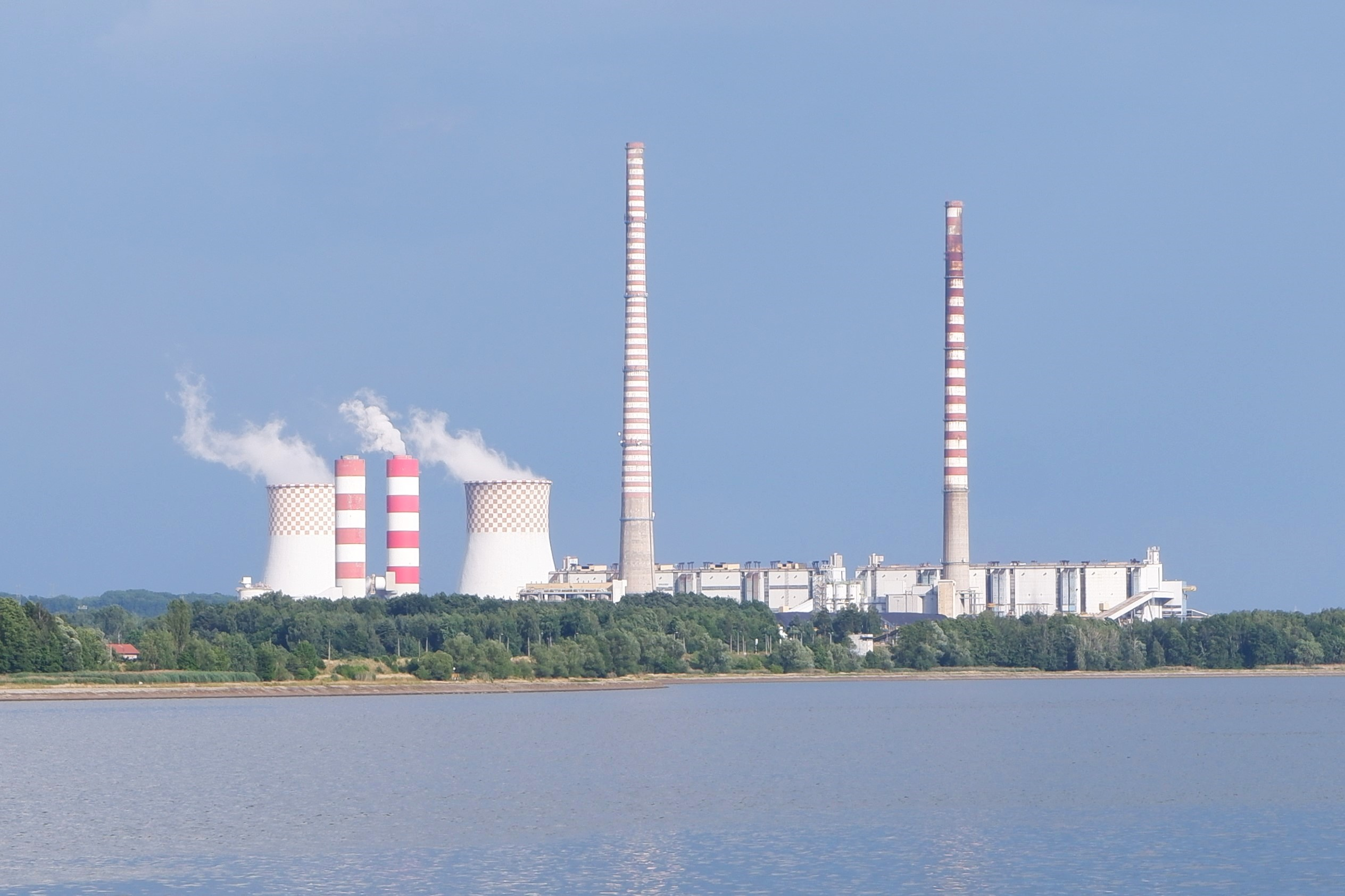
- Country: Poland
- Location: Rybnik
- Coordinates: 50°08′N 18°32′E
- Status: Operational
- Commission date: 1972
- Owners: EDF; EnBW Energie Baden-Württemberg; Elektrociepłownie Wybrzeże SA
- Operator: Elektrownia Rybnik SA

Thermal power station
- Primary fuel: Coal

Power generation
- Units operational: 8 x 215 MW
- Make and model: Rafako; Zamech; LMZ; Dolmel; Electrosila
- Nameplate capacity: 1,720 MW
- Annual net output: 9,000 GWh

External links
- Website: elektrowniarybnik.pl/index.html
- Commons: Related media on Commons

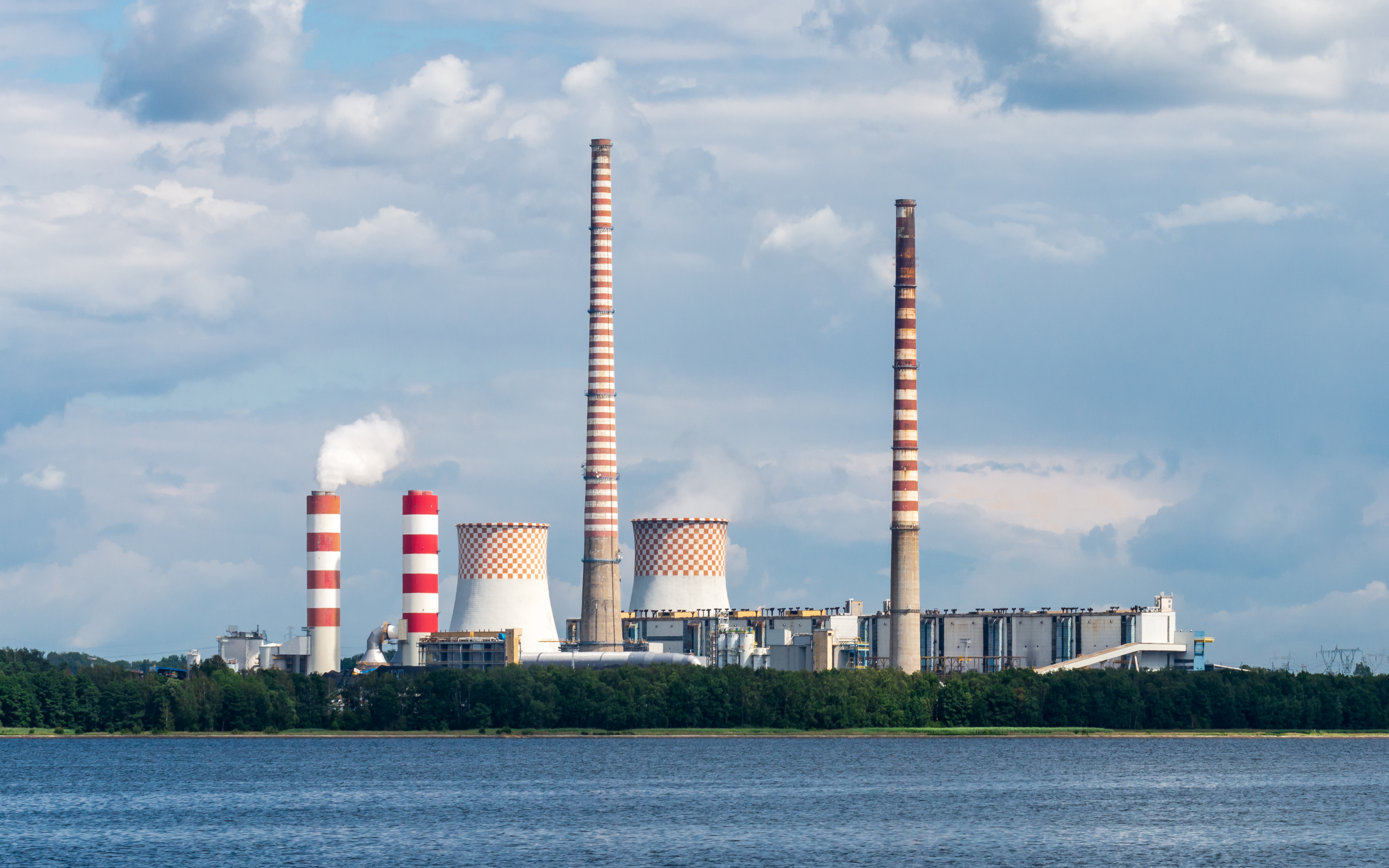
Rybnik power station seen from Lake Rybnickie (Poland). White smoke comes up a chimney close to the characteristic red and white checkered cooling towers.

Rybnik Power Station is a hard coal-fired power station at Rybnik in Poland. The power station was built in the 1970s. It has installed power generation capacity of 1,775 MW. The average annual production of electricity amounts to 9 TWh. Rybnik Power Station has two 120-metre (390 ft) tall cooling towers and two large flue gas stacks, one with a height of 260 metres (850 ft) and another with a height of 300 metres (980 ft).

This hard coal power plant is located on the outskirts of the city of Rybnik in Upper Silesia (Silesian Voivodeship) the most industrialized region of Poland where most of the hard-coal mines and the majority of hard-coal power plants are located. It is the biggest power plant in upper Silesia region.

== History ==
The eight generation units of the Rybnik Power Station were commissioned in 1972–1978. In 1989, the Rybnik Power Station was separated from the Southern Power District and a separate state-owned company Elektrownia Rybnik was established. In 2001, the company was privatized to Électricité de France and EnBW Energie Baden-Württemberg.

== Technical data ==
- power: 1775 MW (7% of power installed in Poland)
- annual energy production: 9,436,135 MWh
- 8 units of 225 MW of power each operates based on coal with annual consumption amounting to 4–4.5 million tonnes.

== Development ==
Rybnik Power Plant had planned to construct a new unit of 910 MW. The unit was supposed to begin operation in 2018 and projected to generate up to 8% of its energy from co-firing of hard coal with biomass. However, since 19 December 2012 the project is suspended. EdF states that the reasons for the suspension of the project are:

1. the decision of the European Commission not to allow the new Rybnik coal-fired unit to be included in the National Investment Plan of the Republic of Poland resulting in the inability of EdF to compensate through the investment in this hard-coal unit for the CO_{2} emission allowances as allowed under Art 10c of the EU ETS directive,
2. projected reduction of support for coal and biomass co-firing in the most recent version of the proposed Polish renewable energy act,
3. dire economic outlook and the projected decrease of energy demand as compared to the 2008-2009 forecast, the business plan of the EdF Rybnik investment has been based on.

The new unit in Rybnik would produce approximately 4,7 million tonnes of CO_{2} per year and would cost EUR 1,8 billion and EdF planned to cover it from the group's own capital. However, due to the increase in costs due to the Fukushima accident in 2011 and the economic downturn, it is no longer certain whether EdF is able to invest EUR 1,8 billion without resorting to the financial markets. The tender for supplying the boiler and the turbine hall to the new unit in Rybnik has been won by Alstom and is valued at 900 million euros.

== Social effect ==
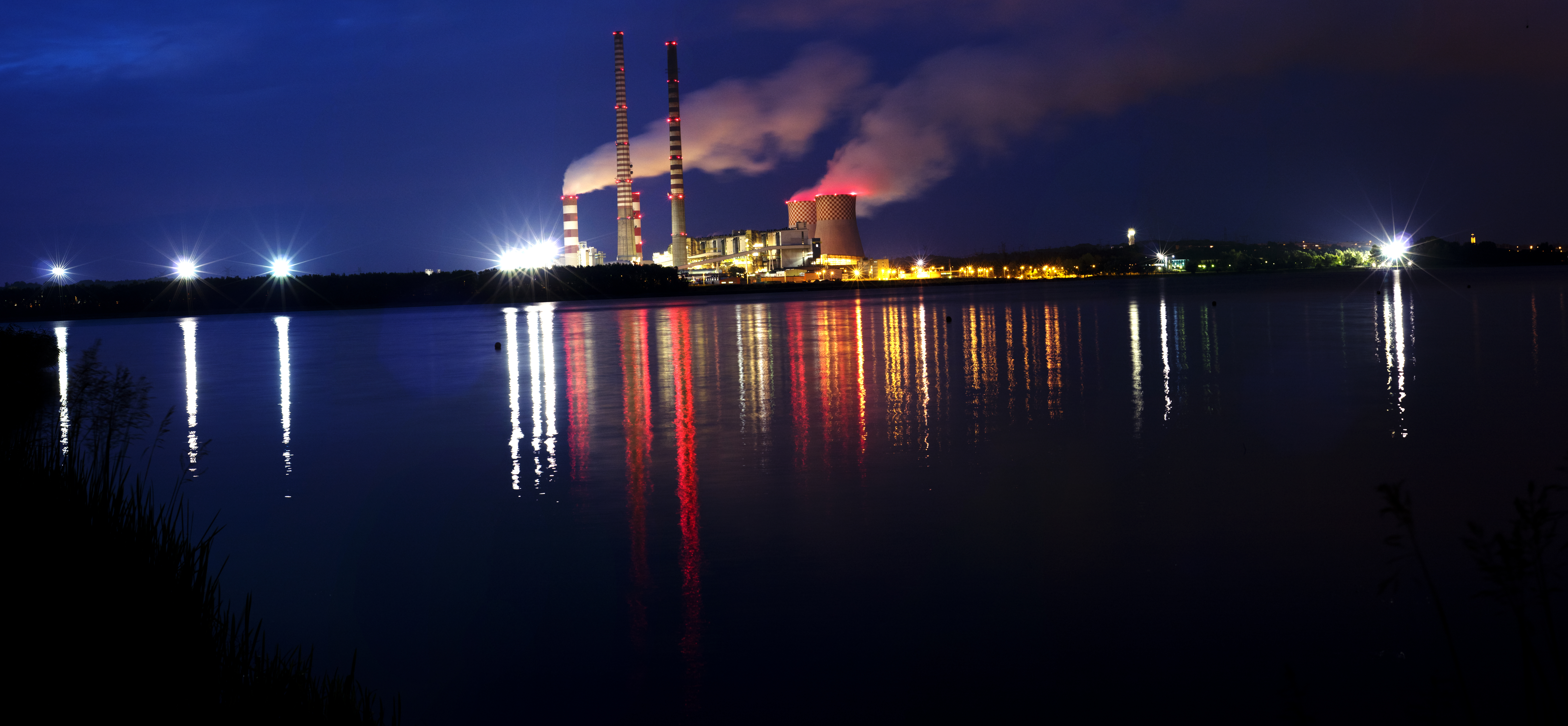
Night view of the Rybnik Power Station

One of the main problems of citizens living in the area of the investment is the bad air quality of Silesia region and Rybnik city in particular. On 21 November 2011 European Commission has sued Poland to the European Court of Justice for lack of progress in transposition of the Ambient Air Quality and Cleaner Air for Europe (CAFE) Directive (2008/50/EC), which should have been implemented in Poland by 11 June 2010. The directive requires in particular that the PM10 (larger dust particles) level does not exceed 50 milligrams/m^{3} more than 35 times a year. However this PM10 level is breached with much higher frequency in most Polish metropolitan areas including Rybnik and Jaworzno in the Silesia region. Recently a group of residents of Rybnik have taken the Polish state to court over the bad air quality and the lack of clear plans to improve the situation in the perceivable future. The local health effects from coal mining, transportation and combustion are also of a significant concern, and communities living in a proximity to these activities are experiencing adverse social effects, such as loss of amenity, displacement, and loss of social capital as well as facing increased risks of respiratory disease, heart disease, and lung cancer.

== Environmental effect ==
Burning coal is one of the most polluting ways of energy production, and the most popular, with China and the U.S. leading the way; 68.7 percent of Chinese electricity comes from coal as of 2006, and 49 percent in the U.S. respectively. It causes significant changes to air quality through emissions of toxic substances such as SO_{2}, NO_{x}, small and large dust particles (PM10 and PM2.5) and heavy metals such as mercury and cadmium. Coal burning is also the largest single contributor to GHGs emissions worldwide and thus affects the climate of the region and the planet. Coal mining and coal combustion also cause serious water shortages and pollution both by modifying ground and subterranean water flows and sewage discharges that affect river and sea flora and fauna. The Silesia region, as well as Rybnik city itself, are struggling with serious air quality problems.

== See also ==
- List of power stations in Poland
