= Nováky Power Plant =

Coal-fired power plant in Slovakia

Coordinates: 48°41′55″N 18°32′00″E

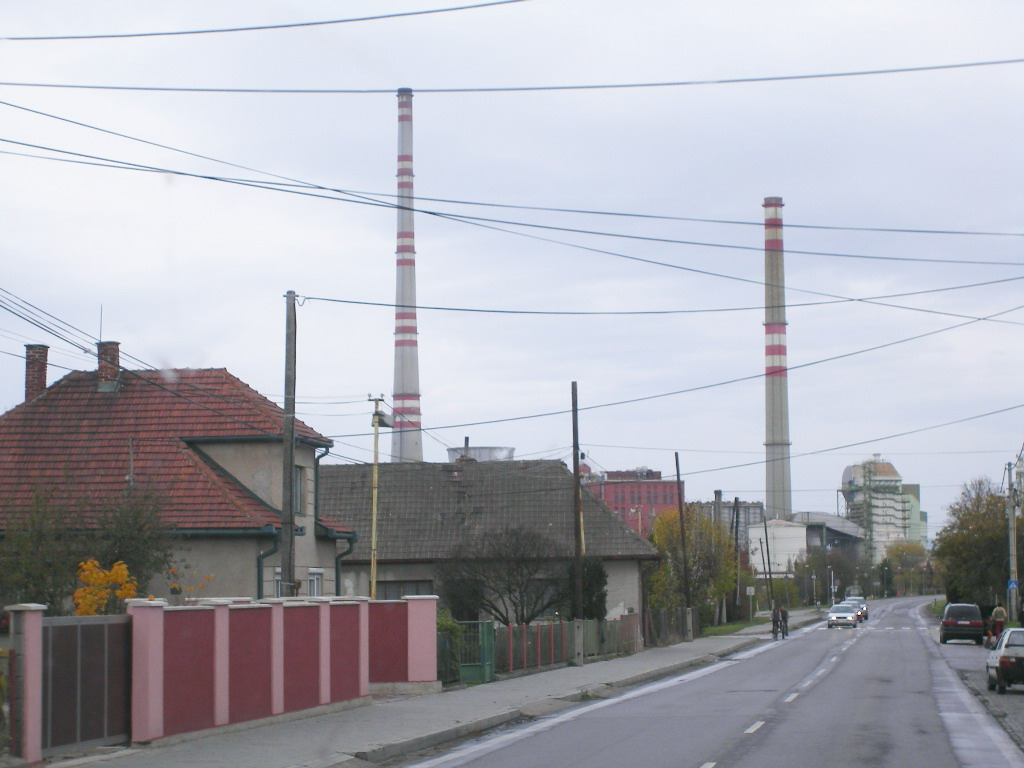
300 m chimney, built in 1976 and 150 m chimney, built in 1963

The Nováky Power Plant was a lignite fired power station located in Zemianske Kostoľany near the Novácke uhoľné bane coal mines in the District of Prievidza, Slovakia. In addition to electricity generation and supply, Nováky Power Plant provided for hot water supplies for heating of the towns of Prievidza, Nováky, Zemianske Kostoľany as well as for industrial and other organisations and steam for heat supplies to surrounding industrial enterprises. It has a 150m tall chimney, built in 1963 and a 300-metre tall chimney, built in 1976.

The power station operated in the Slovak power system under basic and semi-peak modes. With its installed capacity of 266 MWe it accounted for some 6% of Slovenské elektrárne, a.s. installed capacity.

The power plant was ranked by the European Environment Agency as the industrial facility that is causing the highest damage costs to health and the environment in Slovakia and the 18th worst in the entire European Union. It was calculated that the total cost to health and environment of the Nováky Power Plant was between 1.814 and 5.003 billion euro over the 5-year period of 2008 and 2012.

In 2019, the European Commission approved a measure under state aid rules to ensure the plant stays operational even when not profitable, to ensure security of supply in the region.

In 2023, after seventy years of providing electricity and central heating to the region, the plant ceased all operations and was decommissioned on 20. December 2023.
