= Halânga Power Station =

Power station in Romania

- Country: Romania
- Location: Halânga
- Coordinates: 44°40′36″N 22°41′6″E
- Status: Operational
- Owner: R.A. Activitati Nucleare

Thermal power station
- Primary fuel: Coal

Power generation
- Units operational: 7
- Nameplate capacity: 247 MW

The Halânga Power Station is a large thermal power plant located in Halânga, having 7 generation groups, 4 of 25 MW, 2 of 50 MW and 1 of 47 MW having a total electricity generation capacity of 247 MW. The American AES Corporation is also interested in constructing a new 400 MW unit at the station's site worth around US$1.6 billion.

== See also ==
- List of power stations in Romania
