= Energetik, Republic of Bashkortostan =

Energetik Энергетик
- Selo
- Location within Bashkortostan Location within Russia
- Coordinates: 56°14′N 54°33′E
- Country: Russia
- Region: Bashkortostan
- District: Neftekamsk
- Time zone: UTC+5:00

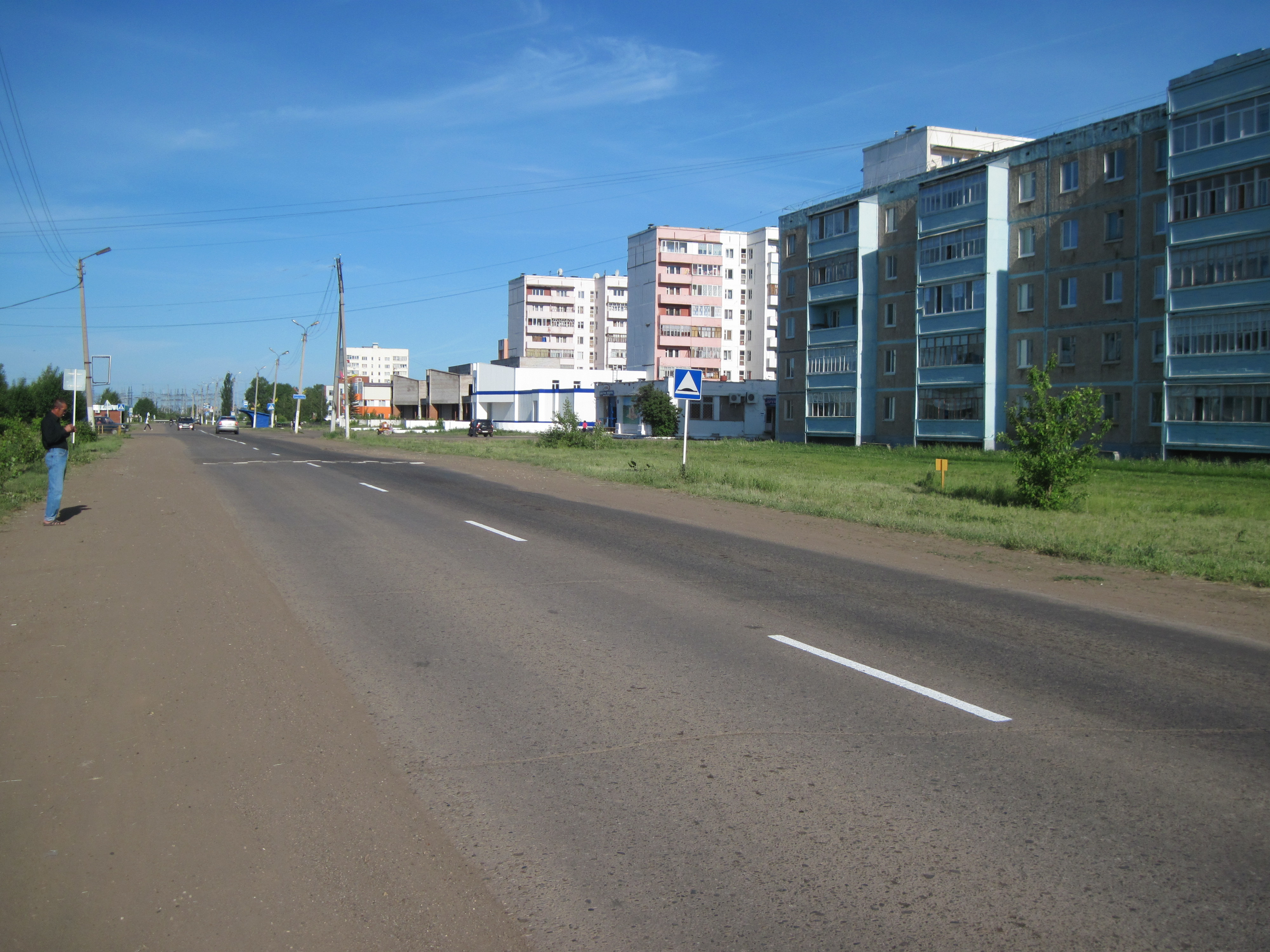
Поселок Энергетик,улица Высоковольтная

Energetik (Russian: Энергетик) is a rural locality (a selo) in Neftekamsk, Bashkortostan, Russia. The population was 3,450 as of 2010. There are 8 streets.
