= Electricity sector in Russia =

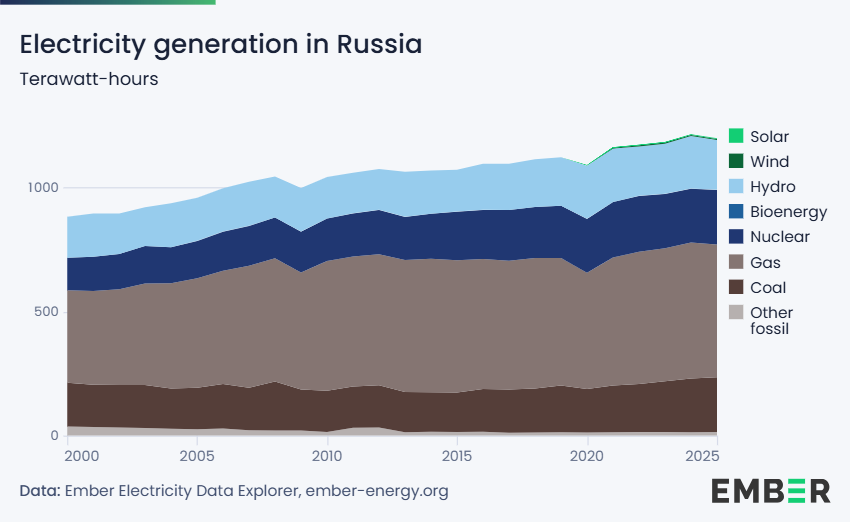
Electricity generation in Russia in terawatt-hours

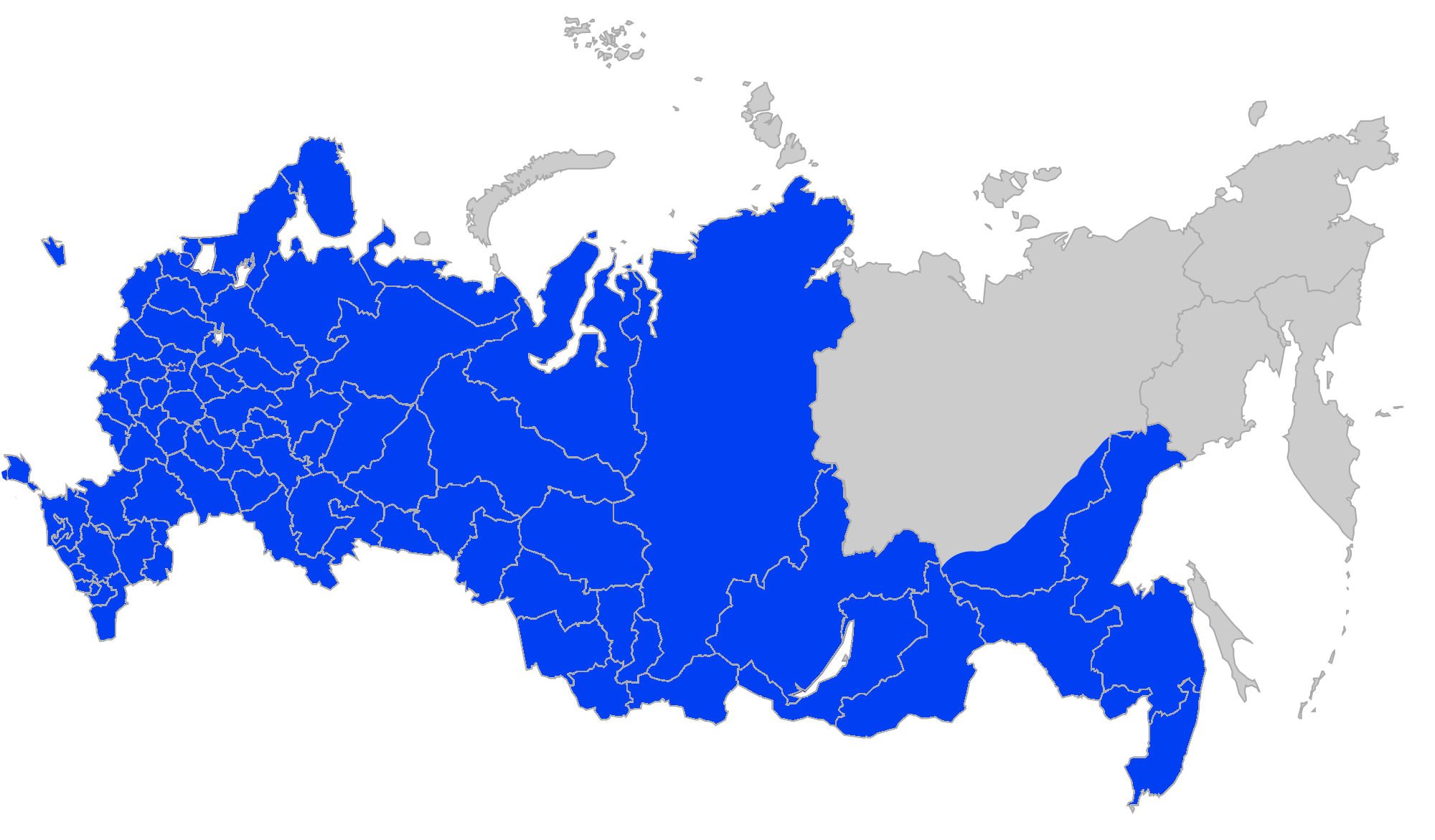
Unified Energy System of Russia

Russia is the fourth largest generator and consumer of electricity in the world. Its 440 power stations have a combined installed generation capacity of 220 GW.

Russia has a single synchronous electrical grid encompassing much of the country. The Russian electric grid links over 3,200,000 kilometres (2,000,000 mi) of power lines, 150,000 kilometres (93,000 mi) of which are high voltage cables over 220 kV. Electricity generation is based largely on gas (46%), coal (18%), hydro (18%), and nuclear (17%) power. 60% of thermal generation (gas and coal) is from combined heat and power plants. Russia operates 31 nuclear power reactors in 10 locations, with an installed capacity of 21 GW.

Despite considerable geothermal and wind resources, this accounts for less than one percent.

== History ==
=== Tsarist period ===
The electric power industry first developed in Russia under the Tsarist regime. The industry was highly regulated particularly by the Ministry of Finance, the Ministry of Trade and Industry and the Ministry of Internal Affairs. This led to considerable delay as electrification was not made a priority in the process of industrialisation.

=== Provisional Government (1917) ===
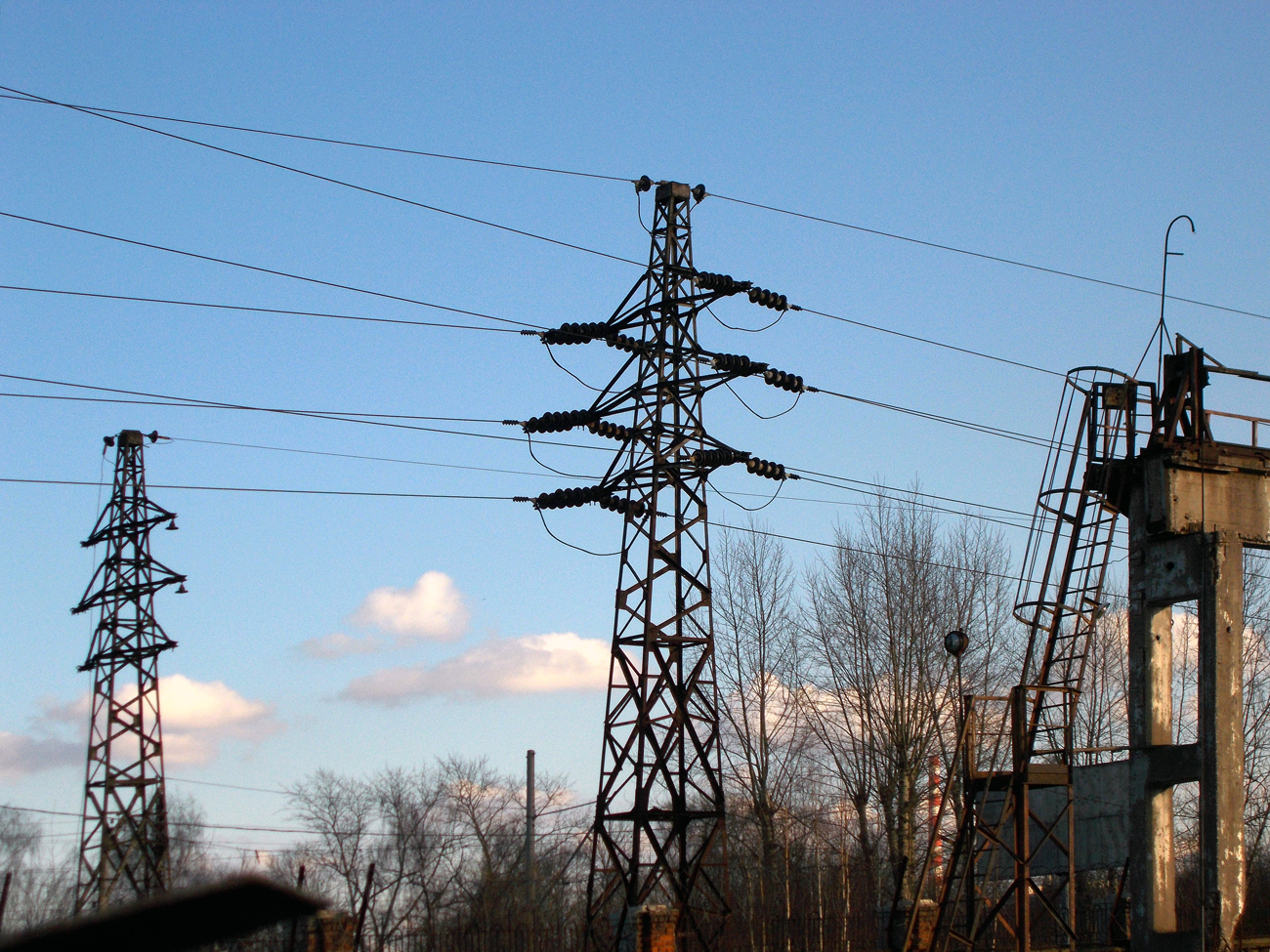
Old Electricity pylons in Elektrostal

The eight months of the provisional government laid the groundwork for a state-owned approach to electrification as part of their move towards a centrally planned economy. They set up the Central Economic Committee.

=== Soviet electrification ===
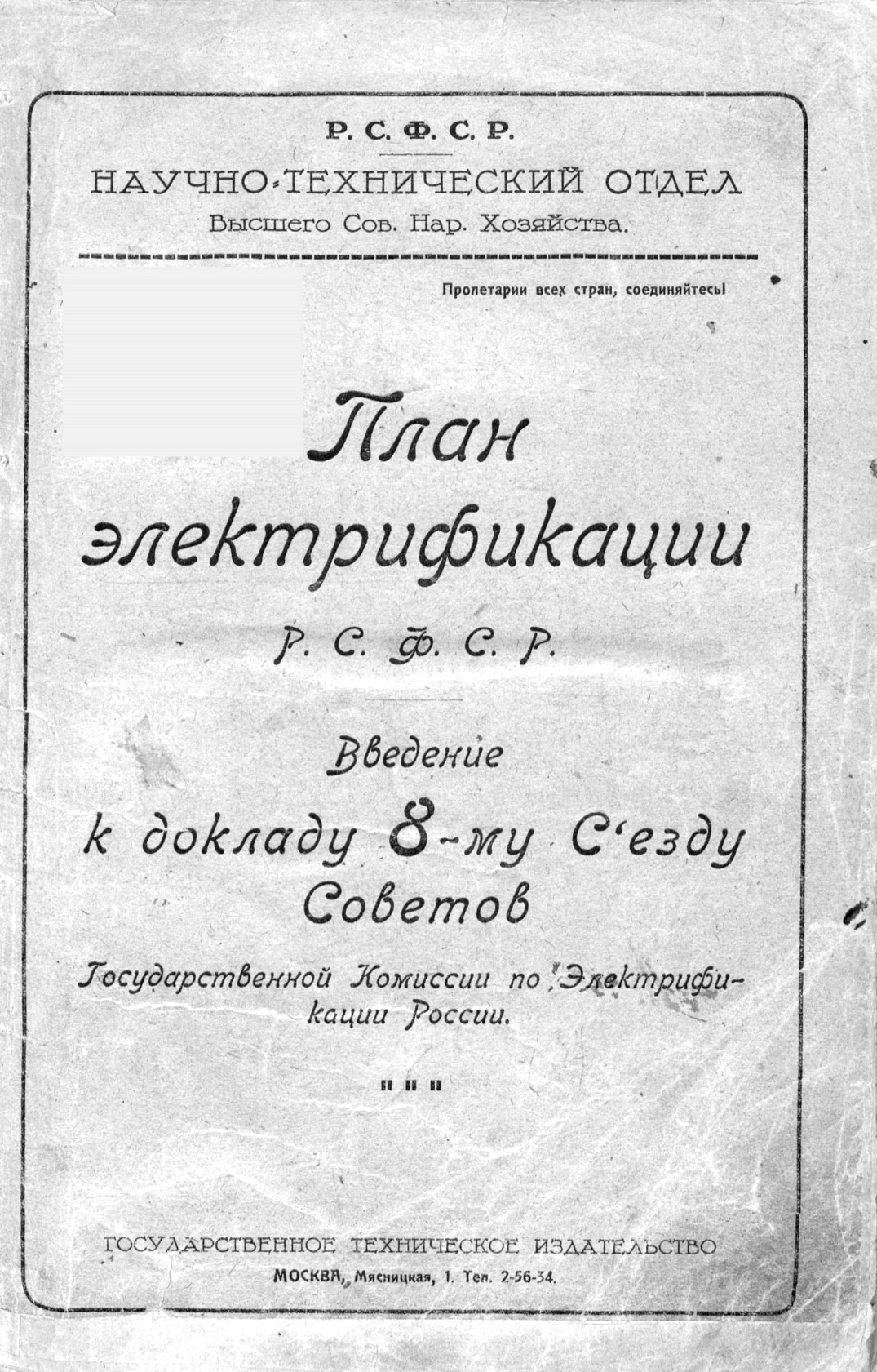
GOELRO plan title page, 1920

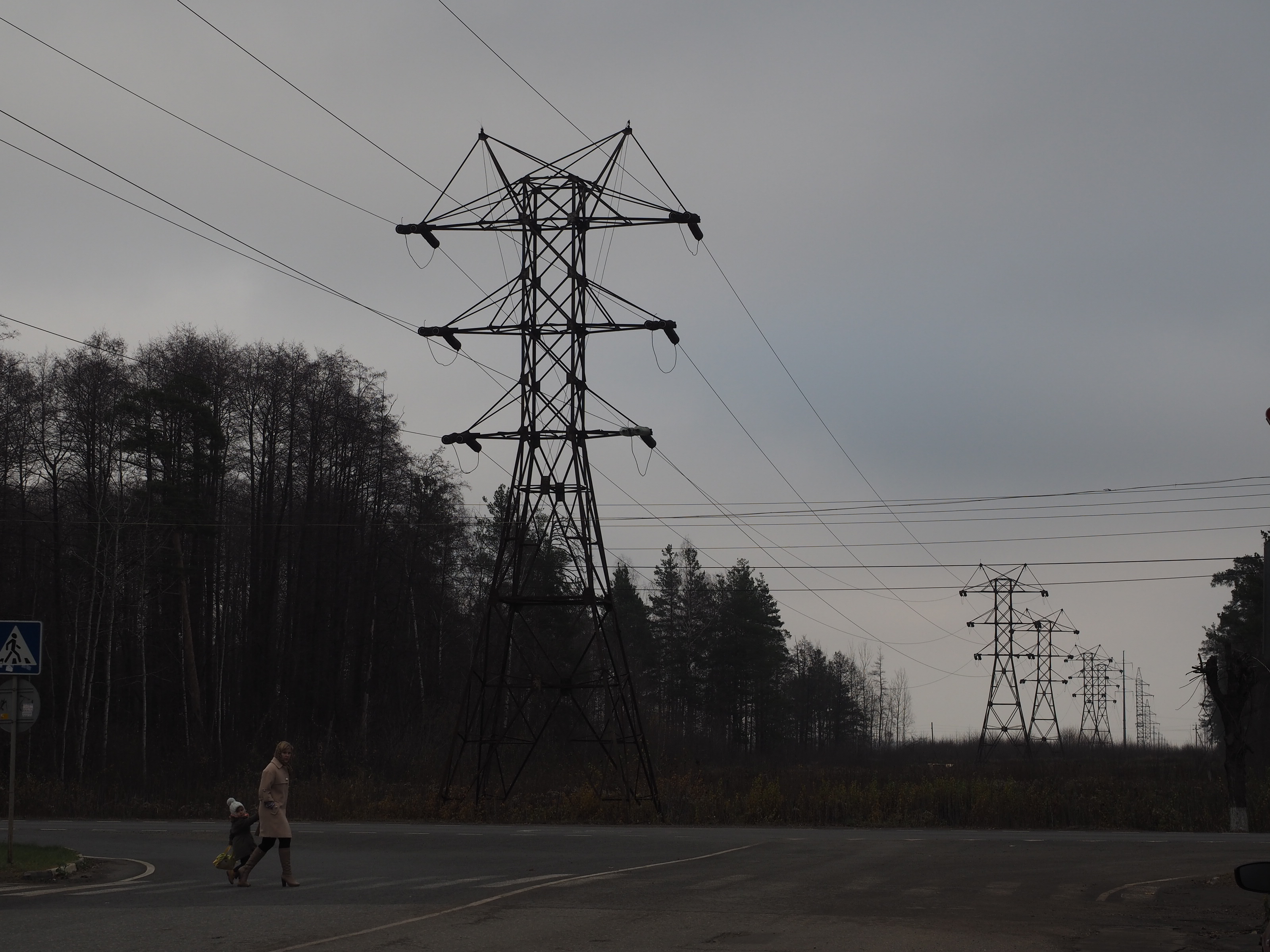
Electricity pylons near Moscow built during GOELRO

Electrification was a key part of the Bolshevik political programme:

Communism is Soviet government plus the electrification of the whole country.

— Vladimir Lenin,

This led to the creation of the GOELRO plan (Russian: план ГОЭЛРО) as the first-ever Soviet plan for national economic recovery and development. It was the prototype for subsequent Five-Year Plans drafted by Gosplan. GOELRO is the transliteration of the Russian abbreviation for "State Commission for Electrification of Russia" (Государственная комиссия по электрификации России).

=== After World War II ===
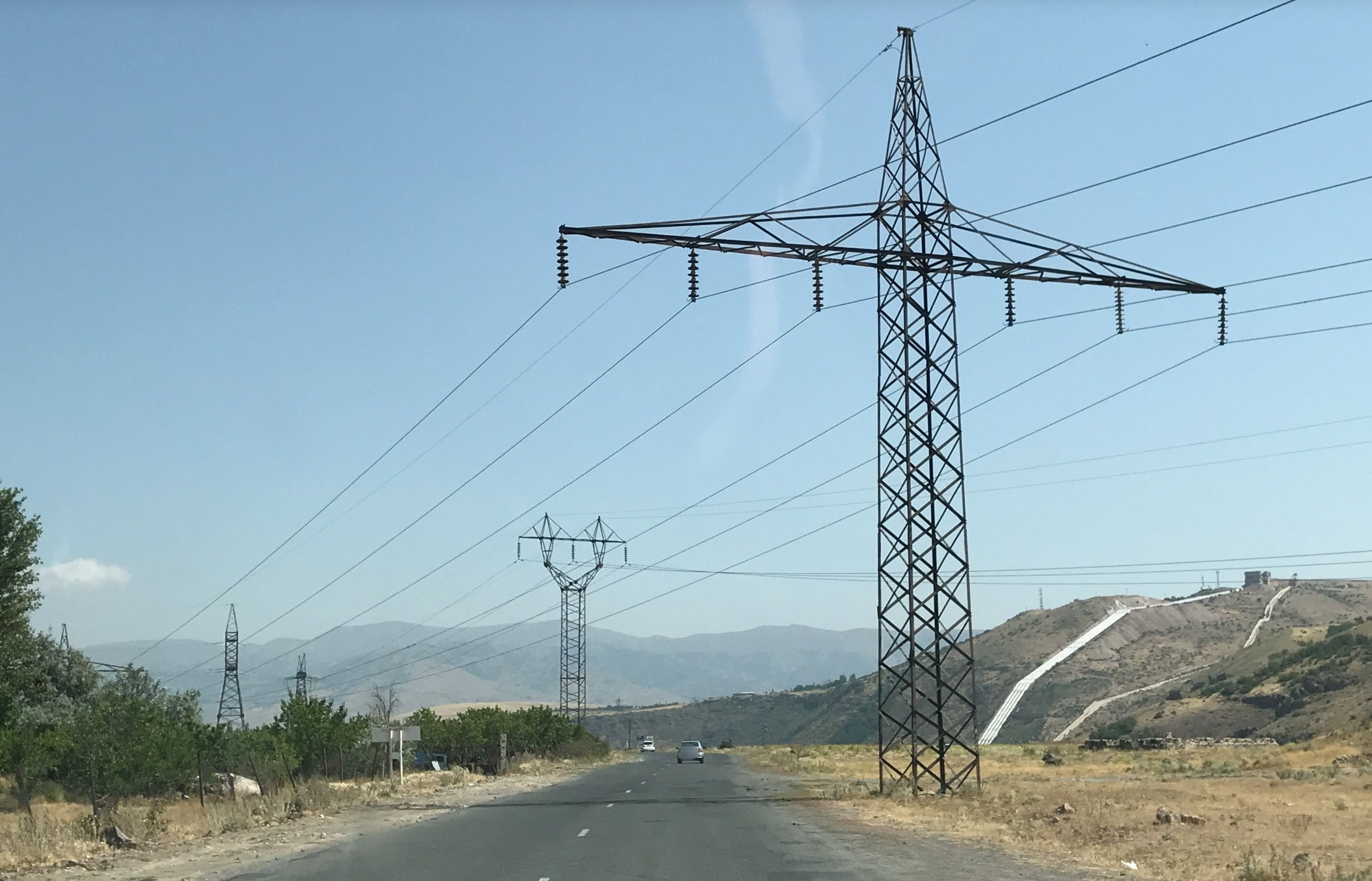
German-made Sachsenwerk pylon in Armenia

The Second World War stopped the electrification programs in the western Soviet Union and left severe damage to generating and transmission systems. After 1945, the Soviets took generators, transformers and even electricity pylons from occupied Germany. Even whole power plants (e.g. Trattendorf power station) were dismantled and transported into the Soviet Union.

In 1954, the first nuclear power plant was commissioned in Obninsk.

In 1985, a 1150-kV ultra-high-voltage power line was commissioned, the first power line operated with more than 1000 kV.

=== Post Soviet development ===
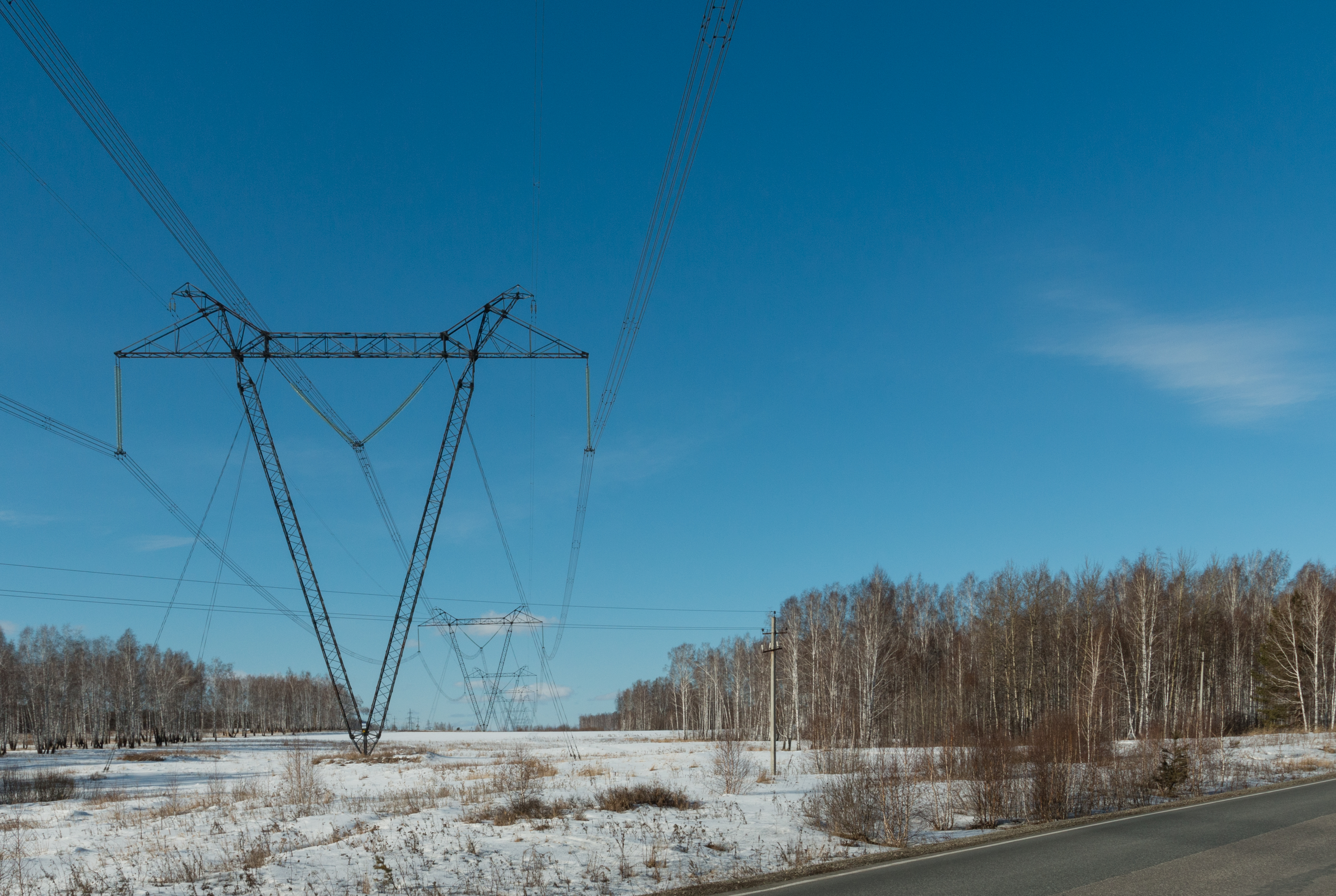
Ekibastuz–Kokshetau high-voltage line, formerly run with 1150 kV

After the dissolution of the Soviet Union, Russia inherited a vertically integrated electric power industry, represented by the Unified Energy System which brought together about 70 regional energy systems, largely aligned with the country’s administrative-territorial divisions. Within each regional system, Energy Production Associations (Russian: производственные энергетические объединения) combined major units: power plants and electrical grids, covering the full cycle of production, transmission, distribution, and sales. Alongside these associations, construction and installation trusts and energy construction complexes performed related tasks. The Unified Energy System developed during the Soviet period under directive planning and strict state control, designed exclusively for state ownership and centralized management.

In 1992, as part of ongoing economic and administrative reforms, the Russian government introduced a plan to create a new federal-level management structure for the Unified Energy System that would align with emerging market conditions. To preserve the Unified Energy System as a single national power complex and guarantee open access to the grid for both producers and consumers, a prerequisite for a competitive electricity market, it became necessary to consolidate all transmission lines and substations within a single entity.

By Presidential Decree No. 1334 of November 5, 1992, Russia’s electric power sector, excluding nuclear plants, was corporatized into a nationwide holding company: the Russian Open Joint-Stock Company for Energy and Electrification RAO UES. The company’s authorized capital included controlling stakes in territorial energy companies, trunk transmission lines, the dispatch control system, major power plants, and several industrial infrastructure enterprises. RAO UES became a vertically integrated company that combined the assets of thermal and hydroelectric power plants, transmission networks, substations, and shares in energy firms, along with sector-specific research, design, and construction organizations. The decree also specified that subsidiary joint-stock companies, created from power plants whose assets were transferred to RAO UES, would later be reorganized as independent companies. This process was carried out as planned. The next major stage of reform was the reorganization of RAO UES itself. The central mechanism was the separation of specialized companies by activity type, creating independently functioning entities to replace the single integrated structure.

From 1992 to 2008 it was the largest electric power holding company. Four energy companies - Novosibirskenergo, Tatenergo, Irkutskenergo and Bashenergo - managed to avoid incorporation into RAO UES.

=== Privatization and reform ===
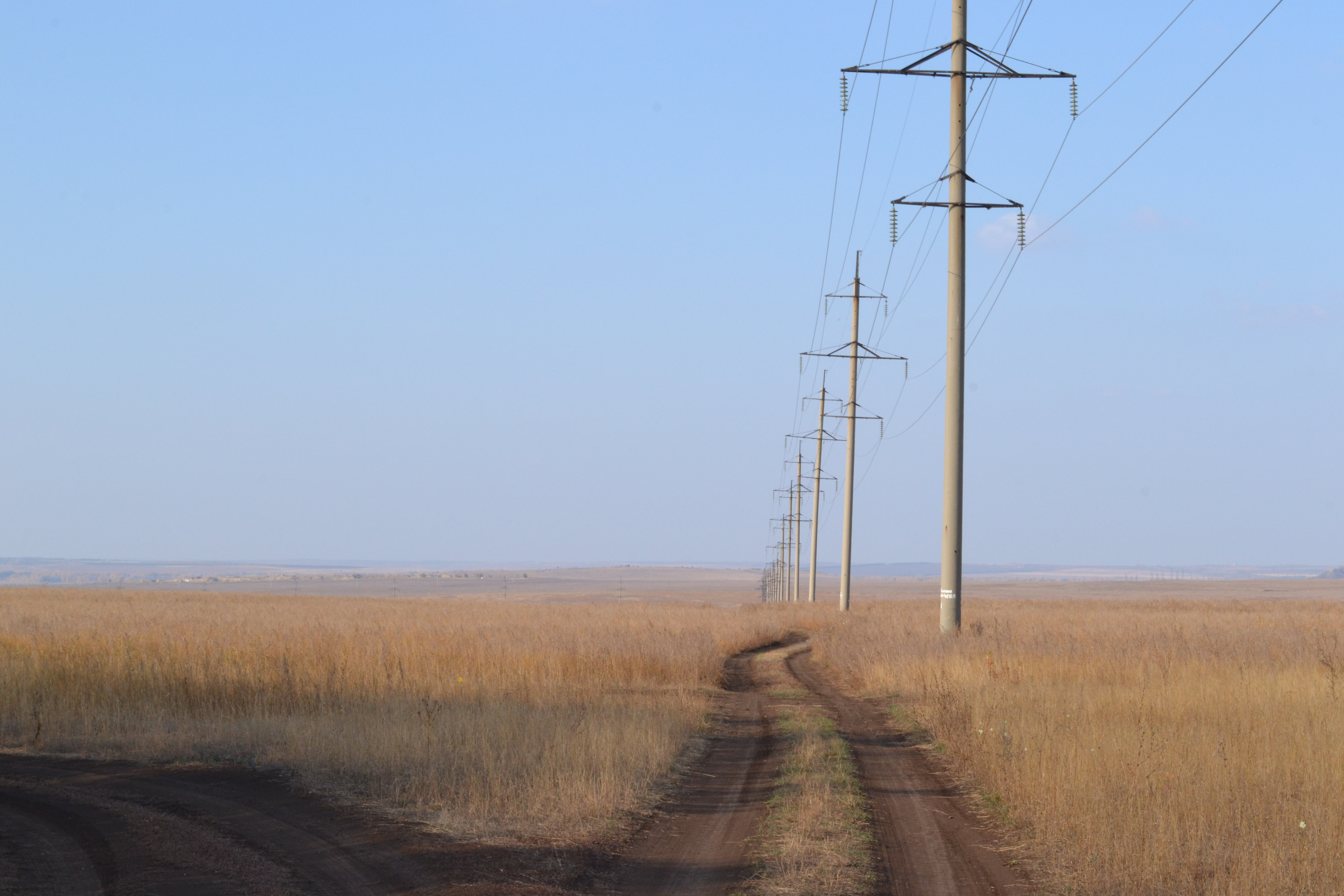
contemporary concrete pylons for 110 kV

In 2002, the Russian government began reforming the power sector. The main goal was and remains upgrading the aging and outdated heating and electricity infrastructure. The restructuring involved the separation and privatization of the generation, transmission and sales companies. The grids were brought under regulatory supervision.

Power generation was divided up into seven wholesale generating companies (OGK) – including RusHydro, 14 territorial generating companies (TGK), independents and state-owned entities. OGKs contain power plants and specialize mainly in electric power generation. TGKs contain predominantly combined heat and power plants (CHPs).

The gradual liberalization of the wholesale electricity market, completed in January 2011, now allows producers to charge market prices. The transmission grid remains mostly under state control.

As a result of the reorganization, Inter RAO UES became a major generating company in Russia in the field of export and import of electric power. The total installed capacity of the power plants owned or managed by the company is around 18,000 MW. The company's main types of activities are generation of electric and thermal power, sales of electric and thermal power to consumers and export and import of electric power.

=== Post-reform developments ===
Price increase followed the reform process, 3-4 times the margin set by regulatory authorities. In November 2011, then prime minister Vladimir Putin tasked the Ministry for Economic Development (Russia), the Ministry of Energy (Russia) and the 'Federal Tariffs Service' to draft a government resolution restricting the profitability of electric utilities. This "restricted the ability of electric utilities to make money from providing services other than supplying electricity"

As of 2013, Russia had no wholesale electricity market. The Ministry for Energy of Russia, concerned with price increases envisions a wholesale market under bi-lateral contracts between consumers and specific power plants. Inter RAO and Gazprom Energy Holding were lobbying for a different one.

== Equipment producers ==
The Saint Petersburg-based Russian energy systems machine-building company Power Machines is the leading Russian equipment producer, with a share of over 50%. It unites production, supply, construction, maintenance and modernization of equipment for thermal, nuclear, hydraulic and gas turbine power plants.

== Power companies ==
=== Territorial generating companies ===
- TGK-1 - North-West (Leningrad, Murmansk Oblasts and Karelia);
- TGK-2 - north of Central Russia, Vologda and Arkhangelsk Oblasts;
- Mosenergo (TGK-3) - Moscow and Moscow Oblast;
- Quadra (TGK-4) - Black Earth and southern regions of Central Russia (12 Oblasts in all);
- T Plus Group:
  - TGK-5 - Kirov Oblast, Udmurtia, Mari El and Chuvashia;
  - TGK-6 - east of Central Russia, Penza Oblast;
  - TGK-7 - Middle Volga and Orenburg Oblast;
  - TGK-9 - Perm Krai, Sverdlovsk Oblast and Komi Republic;
- Lukoil-Ecoenergo (TGK-8) - Southern Federal District;
- Fortum (TGK-10) - Urals Federal District (except for Sverdlovsk Oblast);
- TGK-11 - Omsk and Tomsk Oblasts;
- Siberian Generation Company:
  - Kuzbassenergo (TGK-12) - Kemerovo Oblast and Altai Krai;
  - Yenisei Territorial Generation Company (TGK-13) - Krasnoyarsk Krai, Khakassia and Tyva;
- TGK-14 - Buryatia and the Trans-Baikal Krai.

=== Wholesale generating and other companies ===
- Inter RAO
  - OGK-1 - merged into Inter RAO in 2012
  - OGK-3 - merged into Inter RAO in 2012
- OGK-2
  - OGK-6 - merged into OGK-2 in 2010
- Unipro (OGK-4)
- Enel Russia (OGK-5)
- Irkutskenergo - independent vertically integrated company, it owns the production and distribution facilities supplying the Irkutsk region.
- RusHydro - excluded from the 2003 reform law, as it is considered a strategic asset.
- Rosenergoatom - state-owned company controlling all nuclear power generation assets.

=== Transmission and distribution companies ===
- Rosseti
  - MOESK - Moscow metropolitan area
  - FGC UES

=== Supply companies ===
Largest supply companies:

- OJSC First Supply Company
- OJSC Saint Petersburg Supply Company
- OJSC Samaraenergo
- OJSC EK Vostok

=== Isolated energy systems ===
Some parts of the country have limited connections to the Russian unified energy system, reducing the likelihood that new companies will enter the energy supply market by importing energy from neighboring energy systems. Those areas, defined as "non-price" zones, include Kaliningrad Oblast, the Komi Republic, Arkhangelsk Oblast, the south of the Sakha Republic, Primorsk Krai, Khabarovsk Krai, Amur Oblast, and the Jewish Autonomous Oblast.

Additionally, some parts of Russia are completely isolated from the unified energy system, including Kamchatka, Magadan Oblast, Sakhalin Oblast, Chukotka and Taimyr Autonomous Okrug, the western and central parts of the Sakha Republic, as well as many remote settlements across the country. Energy prices in "non-price" and isolated regions are exempt from liberalization and remain regulated.

== Consumption ==
Power end use (TWh and %)
	Russia	World	Russia %
1990	827	9,708	8.5%
1995	618	10,859	5.7%
2000	609	12,665	4.8%
2004	646	14,415	4.4%
2005	650	15,064	4.3%
2006	682	15,712	4.3%
2007	701	16,487	4.3%
2008	726	16,819	4.3%
Note: Gross use of electricity 2008: Russia 1,038 TWh, the world 20,181 TWh

In 2008 the end use of electricity was 4.3% (726 TWh) of the world total (16,819 TWh). In 2008 the gross production of electricity was 5.1% (1,038 TWh) of the world total (20,181 TWh).

== Mode of production ==
Electricity generation by source in Russia in 2016

- Natural gas: 521,788 GWh (47.9%)
- Nuclear: 196,614 GWh (18.1%)
- Hydro: 186,640 GWh (17.1%)
- Coal: 171,443 GWh (15.7%)
- Oil: 10,968 GWh (1.0%)
- Solar: 462 GWh (0.0%)
- Geothermal: 446 GWh (0.0%)
- Wind: 146 GWh (0.0%)
- Waste: 32 GWh (0.0%)

Gross production of electricity by power source in Russia (TWh)
	Production	Export	Gas	Coal/Peat	Nuclear	Hydro
2004	930	20	421	161	145	176
2008	1,038	18	495	197	163	167
2008			47.7%	19%	15.7%	16.1%
Note: The end use (2008) Russia 726 TWh.

According to the IEA the Russian gross production of electricity was 1,038 TWh in 2008 and 930 TWh in 2004 giving the 4th top position among the world producers in 2008. Top ten countries produced 67% of electricity in 2008. The top producers were: 1) United States 21.5% 2) China 17.1% 3) Japan 5.3% 4) Russia 5.1% 5) India 4.1% 6) Canada 3.2% 7) Germany 3.1% 8) France 2.8% 9) Brazil 2.3% and 10) South Korea 2.2%. The rest of the world produced 33%.

=== Gas ===
The share of natural gas fuelled electricity was 48% of the gross electricity production in 2008 in Russia (495 TWh / 1,038 TWh.

=== Coal and peat ===
The share of coal and peat electricity was 19% of the gross electricity production in 2008 in Russia (187 TWh / 1,038 TWh).

=== Nuclear power ===
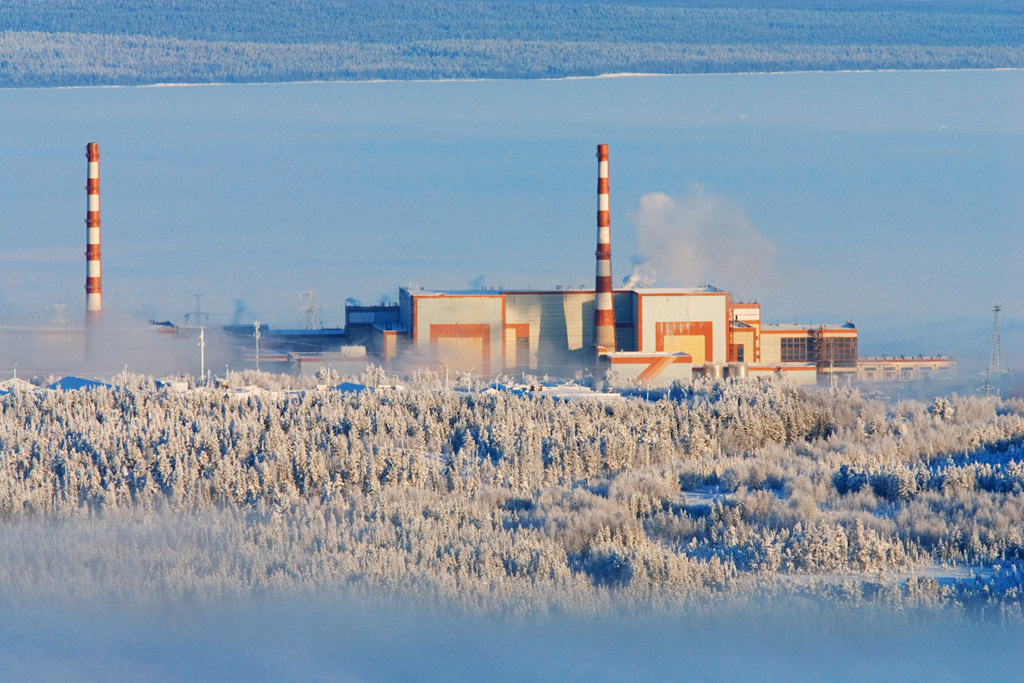
Kola Nuclear Power Plant

In 2008 Russian federation was the 4th country by nuclear electricity production with 163 TWh (6% of the world total). According to the IEA 15.7% of Russian domestic electricity was generated by nuclear power in 2008.

In 2009 Russia had in total 31 nuclear reactors and installed capacity in 2008 23 GW.

==== Nuclear reactor construction and export ====
In 2006 Russia had exported nuclear reactors to Armenia, Bulgaria, Czech Republic, Finland, Hungary, India, Iran, Slovak Republic and Ukraine. In Russia, the average construction time was in 1) 1965-1976 57 months and 2) 1977-1993 72–89 months, but the four plants that have been completed since then have taken around 180 months (15 years), due to increased opposition following the Chernobyl accident and the political changes after 1992.

=== Hydropower ===
As of 2008 hydroelectric power plants generated 167 TWh from a total capacity of 47 GW. Russia is the 5th-largest producer of electricity from hydropower in the world, accounting for 5.1% of the world's hydroelectric generation. The use of other renewable sources for electricity in 2008 was not significant in the Russian Federation, according to the statistics of the IEA in terms of electricity volume in 2008.

== Electrical grid ==
The IPS/UPS is a wide area synchronous transmission grid of some CIS countries with a common mode of operation and centralized supervisory control. It has an installed generation capacity of 300 gigawatts, and produces 1,200 terawatt-hours (TWh) per year for its 280 million customers. The system spans eight time zones.

== See also ==
- IPS/UPS: the unified energy system of Russia and other former Soviet countries
- Energy in Russia
- Energy policy of Russia
- Electric energy markets by country
