= OGK =

OGK may refer to:

- The OGK, a professional wrestling tag team
- The extraterritorial energy companies of the wholesale electricity market (Оптовая генерирующая компания, ОГК), separated from RAO UES
  - OGK-1
  - OGK-2
  - OGK-3
  - OGK-4, now Unipro
  - OGK-5, now Enel Russia
  - OGK-6
