= OGK-2 =

OJSC OGK-2
- Native name: OAO Оптовая генерирующая компания № 2
- Romanized name: OAO Optovaya Generiruyushchaya Kompaniya 2
- Company type: Public (OAO)
- Traded as: MCX: OGKB
- Industry: Electricity
- Predecessor: RAO UES
- Founded: 2005
- Headquarters: Solnechnodolsk, Russia
- Key people: Stanislav V. Neveynitsyn (CEO)
- Products: Power and heat
- Revenue: $1.92 billion (2021)
- Operating income: $105 million (2021)
- Net income: $60.2 million (2021)
- Total assets: $2.85 billion (2021)
- Total equity: $1.94 billion (2021)
- Number of employees: 4,928
- Parent: Gazprom
- Website: www.ogk2.ru

OGK-2 (Wholesale generating company №2) is a Russian power generation company. A majority of the company's stock is owned by Gazprom.

== History ==
In 2005, five thermal power plants with an installed capacity of about 8,700MW were merged into single company. The power output of these plants in 2007 was around 48TWh.

In April 2010, Gazprom, the major shareholder of OGK-2 and OGK-6, announced a plan to merge these companies. OGK-2 issued 26.59 billion new shares (81.2% of existing share capital) which were used for conversion of OGK-6 shares at a ratio of 1.2141 OGK-6 to 1 OGK-2 share. The merger was completed by 1 November 2011.

== Operations ==
OGK-2 operates following power stations:

- Pskov GRES – 430 MW
- Serov GRES – 526 MW
- Stavropol GRES – 2,400 MW
- Surgut GRES-1 - 2,059 MW
- Troitsk GRES – 3,280 MW
- Novocherkassk GRES – 2,112 MW,
- Kirishi GRES – 2,100 MW
- Ryazan GRES – 2,650 MW
- Krasnoyarsk-2 GRES - 1,250 MW
- Cherepovets GRES - 1,050 MW
- GRES-24 - 310 MW (at Novomichurinsk; merged with Ryazan GRES in November 2008)

The installed capacity of the company is 17,750MW.

== See also ==
- Inter RAO
