= North-West Thermal Power Plant =

Power station in Saint Petersburg, Russia

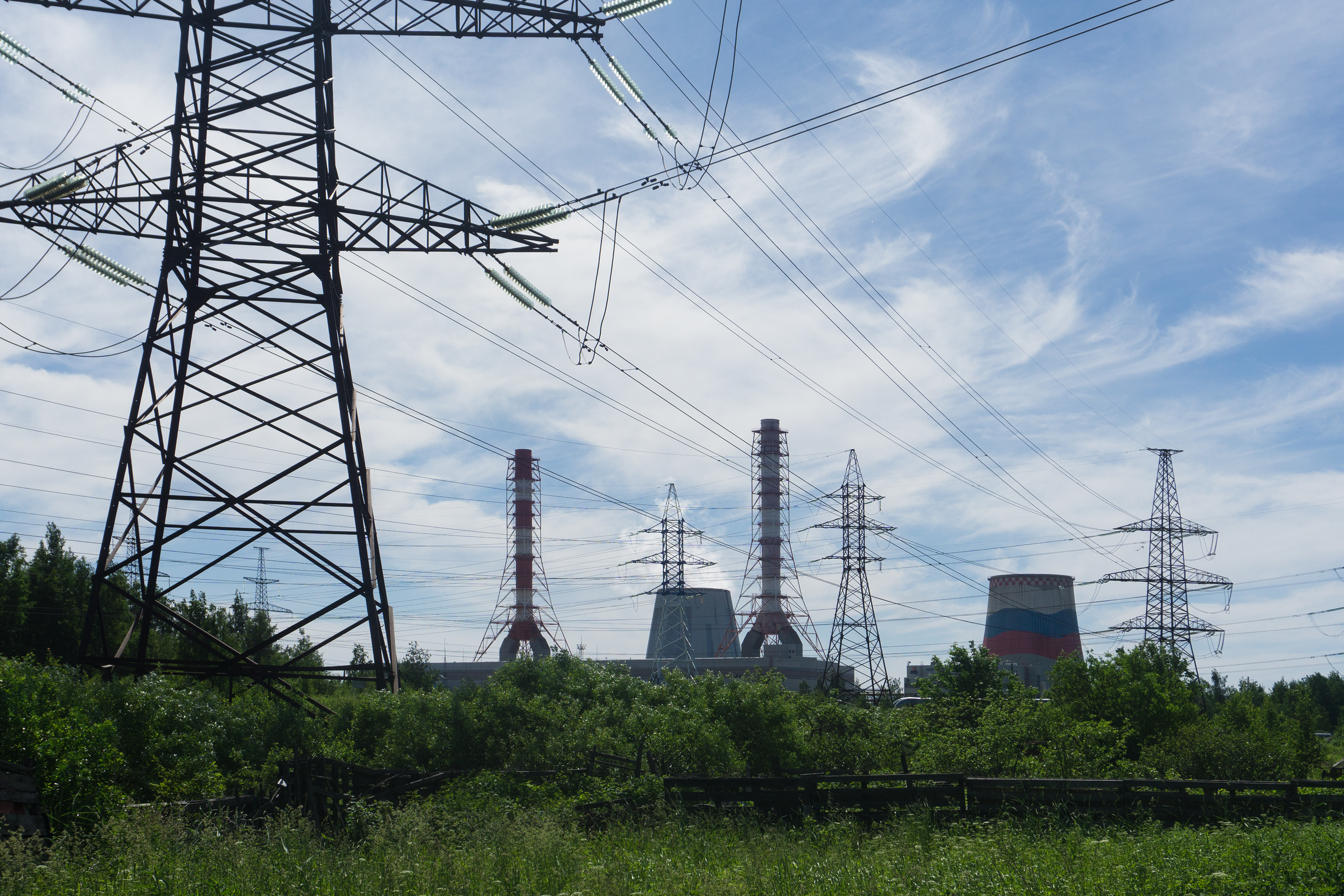
- Official name: Северо - Западная ТЭЦ
- Country: Russia
- Location: Saint-Petersburg
- Coordinates: 60°0.95′N 30°5.52′E
- Commission date: 2000
- Owner: Inter RAO UES

Thermal power station
- Primary fuel: Natural gas
- Combined cycle?: Yes

Power generation
- Units operational: 2
- Nameplate capacity: 900 MW

External links
- Commons: Related media on Commons

North-West Thermal Power Plant (Russian: Северо - Западная ТЭЦ) is a cogeneration power station (TETs) in Saint-Petersburg, owned by Inter RAO UES. This is a first power station in Russia to use combined cycle.

== History ==
Building of the station began in 1994, and in 2000 first unit of the station was started to generate electrical energy. The gas-fired combined-cycle plant has a capacity of 900 MW. 90% of all produced electric power was exported to Finland until May 2022, when the export halted. It was owned by the company of same name with majority shares held by RAO UES. In December 2007, as a result of reorganizations of RAO UES, it was decided to merge the North-West Thermal Power Plant with Inter RAO UES. The merger was completed on 1 May 2008 and the North-West Thermal Power Plant ceased to exist as independent company.

Since 2004, the power station was managed by Enel ESN Energo, a subsidiary of Enel.

== See also ==
- OGK-1
