= GRES-1 =

GRES-1 may refer to:

- Beryozovskaya GRES, a coal-fired power station near the town of Sharypovo in Krasnoyarsk Krai, Russia.
- Ekibastuz GRES-1, a coal-fired power station in Kazakhstan.
- Surgut-1 Power Station, an oil-fired power station in Surgut, Russia.
