= OGK-6 =

Defunct Russian power generation company

OJSC OGK-6
- Native name: ОАО «ОГК-6»
- Company type: Public (OAO)
- Industry: Power generation
- Predecessor: RAO UES
- Founded: 16 March 2005
- Defunct: 1 November 2011
- Fate: Merged with OGK-2
- Successor: OGK-2
- Headquarters: Moscow, Russia
- Key people: Alexey Mityushov (CEO)
- Products: Power and heat
- Revenue: US$1.5 billion (2007)
- Number of employees: 6,100 (2007)
- Parent: Gazprom

The Sixth Wholesale Power Market Generating Company JSC (OGK-6) was a Russian power generation company formed by merger of six generation companies. In 2006, the following power plants were merged into single company:

- Novocherkassk GRES – 2,112 MW,
- Kirishi GRES – 2,100 MW
- Ryazan GRES – 2,650 MW
- Krasnoyarsk-2 GRES - 1,250 MW
- Cherepovets GRES - 1,050 MW
- GRES-24–310 MW (at Novomichurinsk; merged with Ryazan GRES in November 2008)

The installed capacity of all six thermal power plants was about 9,052 MW which made OGK-6 the fourth largest power company by installed capacity in Russia. The total installed heat of OGK-6 plants amounted to 2,704 Gcal/h. The power output of the OGK-6 power plants in 2007 was around 32.065 TWh.

OGK-6 shares were traded on MICEX and RTS.

In April 2010, it was announced that Gazprom, the major shareholder of OGK-2 and OGK-6, will merger OGK-6 into OGK-2 to create a single company with 10 power stations and a capacity of 17,750 MW. The merger was completed by 1 November 2011.
