= Beryozovskaya GRES =

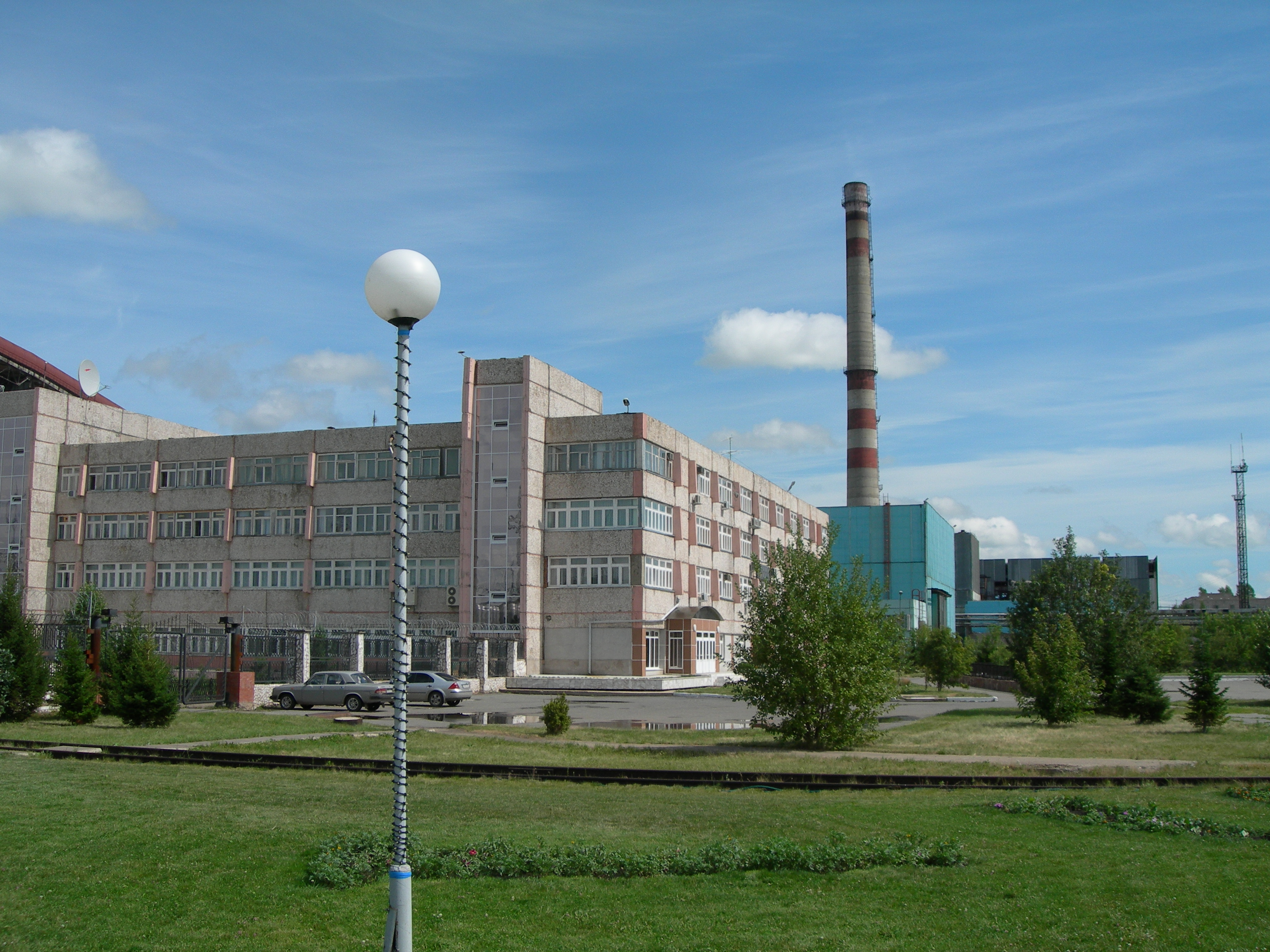
- Beryozovsk power plant behind administrative building
- Country: Russia
- Location: Sharypovo, Krasnoyarsk Krai
- Coordinates: 55°34′46″N 89°04′21″E
- Status: Operational
- Commission date: 1988
- Owner: Unipro

Thermal power station
- Primary fuel: Coal
- Cogeneration?: Yes

Power generation
- Units operational: 1 x 820 MW, 2 x 800 MW
- Make and model: LMZ; Electrosila
- Nameplate capacity: 2,420 MW
- Annual net output: 8,000 GWh

External links
- Website: www.eon-russia.ru?obj=id2300&id=1685
- Commons: Related media on Commons

Beryozovskaya GRES is a coal-fired power plant near the town of Sharypovo in Krasnoyarsk Krai, Russia. The power plant is owned by Unipro. The installed capacity of the plant is 2,420 megawatts (3,250,000 hp).

Its flue gas stack is 370 metres (1,210 ft) tall and the tallest free-standing structure in Russia outside the Moscow and Sankt-Petersburg areas.

== General information ==
The Beryozovskaya power plant provides extra electricity for the Russian power grid during winter, when electrical demand peaks. In other seasons the average load of the power plant is below half its capacity as the Central Siberian region uses several more efficient hydro power plants. The production cost for one kilowatt-hour by station is close to US$0.01, and the annual production can be over 10,000 gigawatt-hours (36,000 TJ).

The lignite used by the power plant belongs to Kansk-Achinsk basin with total reserves 600 bn tonne, one third of it is available for surface mining. The plant uses coal from a field with proved reserves of 3.7 bn tonne, which is 14 km away. The transportation of this fuel from the pit to power plant uses a transporter line, which is capable of transferring up to 40 mn tonne of coal annually.

Production has grown in last years and there are plans to develop the station by adding new generators. The power plant also performs centralized heat supply. For self-cooling purposes it uses reservoir, which holds back the river Beresh (Chulym basin), instead of applying cooling towers.

== History ==
According to original Soviet project the final installed capacity of the power plant should be 6.4 GW with eight 800 MW generators. The construction of Beryozovskaya GRES began in 1970, its first two generators were commissioned in 1990. Mounting of the chimney was completed in 1985, its height is 370 m.

In 2012 Enka began construction of the third generator unit at the Berezovskaya power plant. The structural design of this project is comparable to the first two generators at the Berezovskaya power plant, but features an upgrade to increase efficiency and reduce nitrogen oxide emissions.

== Present activities ==
Installed capacity of the power plant was planned 1,600 MW. However, shortly after start of operation, the capacity of existing power units was reduced from the targeted 1,600 MW to about 1,400 MW, due to the intensive slagging of boiler heating surfaces during the operation using the high-ash coal of the Berezovskoye deposit at maximum capacity parameters. In 2009, E.ON Russia JSC launched a project aimed at increasing the capacity of the plant back up to the targeted 1,600 MW. These improvements became possible due to modern energy technologies. The project to increase installed capacity of power unit No. 2 was completed in the end of 2010. The similar project at power unit No. 1 was completed in 2011.Official website As of 2010 year, the power plant is undergoing modernization program, which would improve efficiency and output of existing generators. According to the plans of OGK-4, the station's capacity will raise to 1,600 MW in 2011. Also construction of third unit finished, and it was opened in 2015. Company develops network of pipelines in the region for centralized heat supply to localities around. Since 2023 total capacity of the plant is 2420 MW.

== See also ==
- List of power stations in Russia
