= MICEX 10 =

Unweighted stock price index in Russia

The MICEX 10 Index (Russian: Индекс ММВБ10) is an unweighted price index that tracks the ten most liquid Russian stocks listed on Moscow Exchange. Composition of the index is assessed quarterly following the liquidity criterion. Components are assigned equal weight.

== Calculation ==
The index is the arithmetic average of the change of prices between a time $t$ and a base time 0, which is the end of the preceding quarter. The formula is:

$$\text{MICEX10} = \frac {k}{10}\cdot\sum\limits_{i=1}^{10}\left(\frac {P_{i}}{P^0_i}\right)$$

where $P_{i}$ is the price of the component stock $i$ at time $t$, $P^0_i$ is the price of the component stock $i$ at the end of previous quarter, and $k$ is the adjustment coefficient.

== Components ==
As of June 2017, the composition of the index was the following:

Company	Ticker symbol	Industry	Stock type
NorNickel	GMKN	Precious and non-ferrous metals	Common
Alrosa	ALRS	Mining	Common
Moscow Exchange	MOEX	Finance	Common
Gazprom	GAZP	Oil & gas	Common
FGC UES	FEES	Electric utility	Common
Lukoil	LKOH	Oil & gas	Common
Sberbank	SBER	Banking	Common
Rosneft	ROSN	Oil & gas	Common
Magnit	MGNT	Retail	Common
RusHydro	HYDR	Electric utility	Common
