= Sochi Thermal Power Plant =

Power station in Sochi, Russia

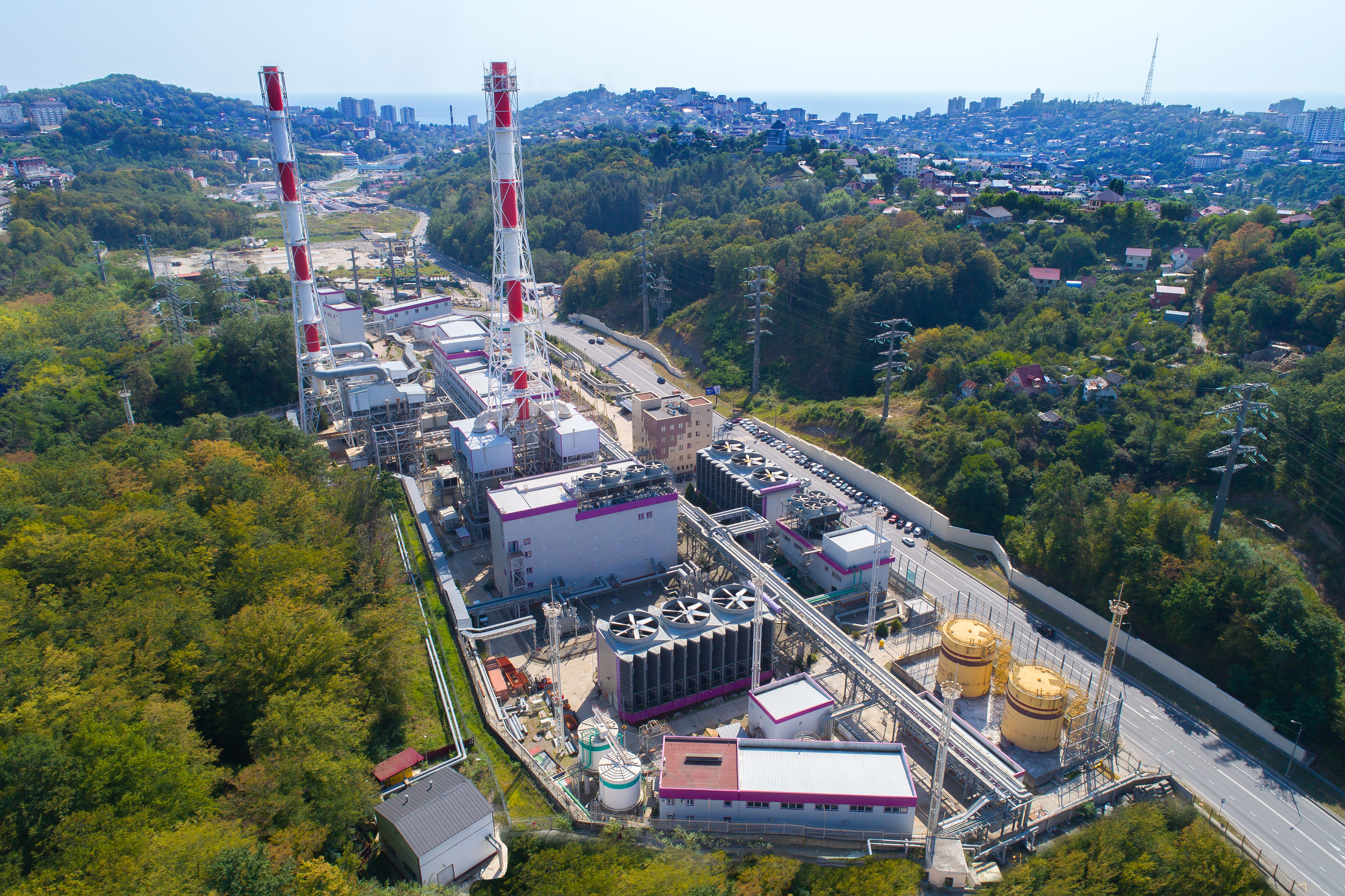
- Official name: Сочинская ТЭС
- Country: Russia
- Location: Sochi
- Coordinates: 43°35′41″N 39°45′16″E
- Status: Operational
- Commission date: 20 December 2004
- Owner: Inter RAO UES

Thermal power station
- Primary fuel: Natural gas

Power generation
- Units operational: 4
- Nameplate capacity: 160 MW

Sochi Thermal Power Plant (Russian: Сочинская ТЭС) is a power station in Sochi, Russia. It is part of the infrastructure constructed or improved for the 2014 Winter Olympics which was held in Sochi. There have been a total of 3 thermal power plants built with one combined heat and power plant along with 19 substations. The combined capacity of the power plants is 1,208 MWt. High and low has pressure pipelines were also added, with a total length of 654 km.

== History ==
The first two generation units with a total capacity of 78 MW were launched in December 2004. After announcement in 2007 that Sochi will host 2014 Winter Olympics, the decision was taken to build the second stage of the plant, and two more units were launched in December 2009.
