= Kovykta field =

Natural gas field in Eastern Siberia, Russia

- Location within Russia
- Country: Russia
- Region: Eastern Siberia
- Location: Zhigalovo and Kazachinsko-Lensk districts, Irkutsk Oblast
- Offshore/onshore: onshore
- Coordinates: 55°23′4″N 106°7′21″E trubagaz.ru
- Owner: Gazprom

Field history
- Discovery: 1987

Production
- Estimated gas in place: 2,000×10^{9} m^{3} (71×10^{12} cu ft)

The Kovykta gas condensate field is one of the largest undeveloped natural gas fields in Eastern Siberia, Russia. The field is located in the northern part of the Irkutsk Oblast, in the Zhigalovo and Kazachinsko-Lensk districts.

== History ==
The field was discovered in 1987. In June 2007, TNK-BP agreed to sell its stake for US$ 700 million to US$ 900 million to Gazprom with option to buy back a 25% plus one share stake in the project. However, this deal never materialized. In June 2010, Rusia Petroleum, the developer of Kovykta field filed for bankruptcy. TNK-BP also tried to sell the field to state-owned Rosneftegaz, but failed. On 1 March 2011, Gazprom bought Rusia Petroleum's assets, including rights for the Kovykta field, for $711 million.

== Reserves ==
The reserves of Kovykta amount to 2 trillion cubic meters of natural gas and more than 83 million tons of gas condensate. The period of active gas production in the Kovykta field is expected to be 30 years, and the period of field development about 50 years.

== Developer ==
The field was developed by Rusia Petroleum, 62.9% of which is owned by TNK-BP. 24.99% is owned by the power generating company OGK-3.

== Significance ==
The Kovykta field is considered to supply natural gas to China and Korea. According to these agreements signed by Rusia Petroleum with China National Petroleum Corporation and Kogas on 2 November 2000, the annual export of gas to China and Korea will be 20 billion cubic meters (bcm) and 10 bcm, respectively. The Kovykta field will contribute also to the gasification of Irkutsk Oblast, implemented by the OAO East Siberia Gas Company, a joint venture of Gazprom (originally TNK-BP) and the Irkutsk Oblast Administration.

== See also ==
- Energy policy of Russia
- Energy policy of China
- Petroleum industry in Russia
