= Kashira Power Plant =

Coal-fired power plant in Kashira, Moscow, Russia

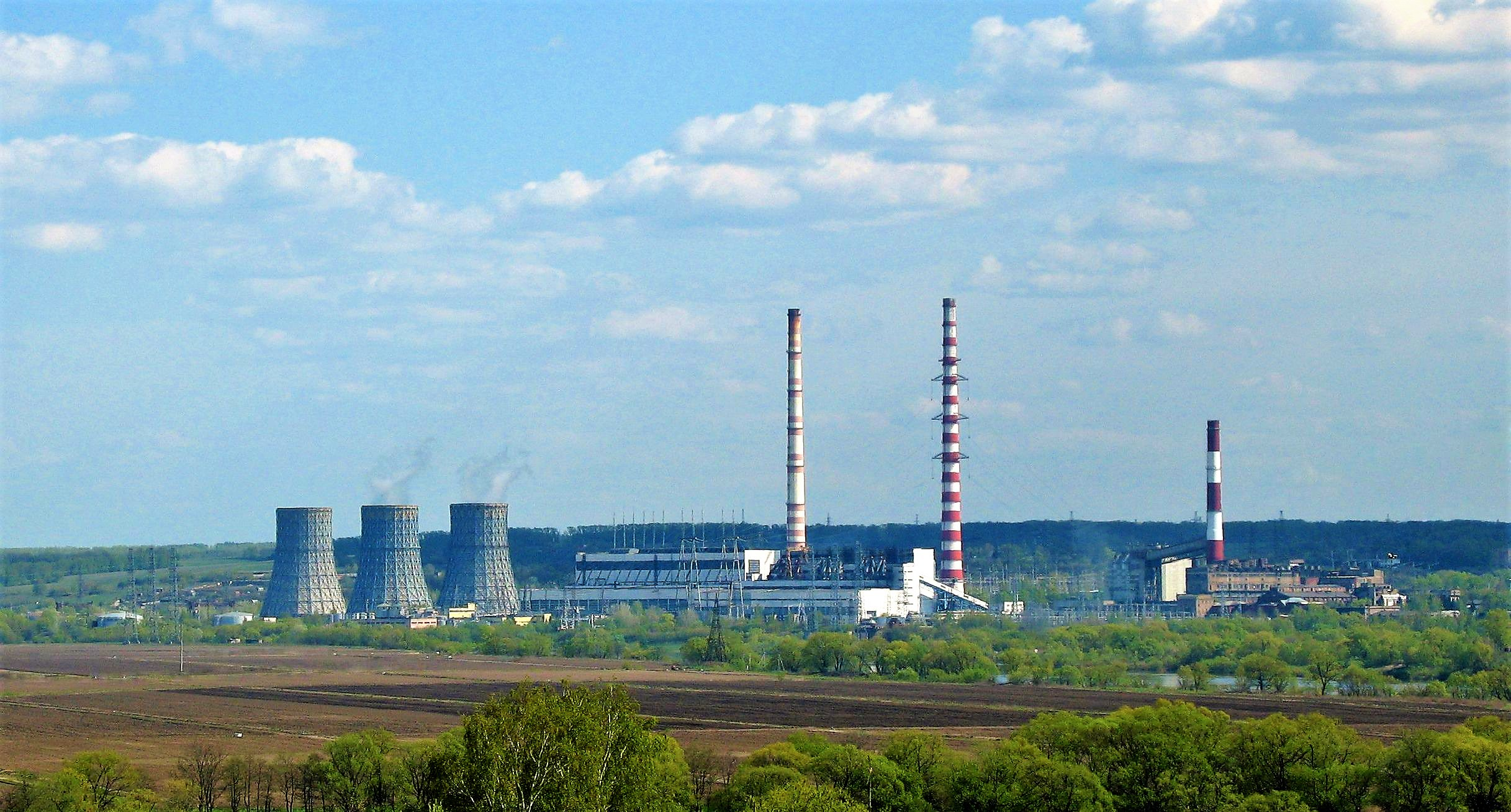
- Official name: Kashirskaya GRES named after G.M. Krzhizhanovsky; Каширская ГРЭС имени Г. М. Кржижановского
- Country: Russia
- Location: Kashira-2
- Coordinates: 54°51′29″N 38°15′35″E
- Status: Operational
- Commission date: 4 June 1922
- Owner: OGK-1

Thermal power station
- Primary fuel: Coal
- Secondary fuel: Natural gas
- Thermal capacity: 80 MWt

Power generation
- Units operational: 1 x 330 MW; 5 x 300 MW; 1 x 80 MWt (heat)
- Nameplate capacity: 1,830 MW (electrical); 80 MWt (heating)
- Annual net output: 8,262 GW·h

External links
- Website: interrao.ru/en/
- Commons: Related media on Commons

Kashira Power Plant is a coal-fired power plant at Kashira in Moscow Oblast, Russia. Its first unit was commissioned in 1922 with a power capacity of 12 MW. As of today, it has an installed power capacity of 1,910 MW and a heating capacity of 533 MWt, and consists of 6 units. Double units 1 and 2 have capacity of 300 MW, and single units 4, 5 have capacity of 300 MW each, unit 6 has capacity of 330 MW. In addition, unit 7 has thermal capacity of 80 MW.

In 1951 a HVDC link with 30 MW built from the components of Elbe-Project to Moscow was built. Its terminal is situated west of the 110 kV switchyard at 54°51'29"N 38°14'45"E. However it is not in service any more. The power plant has an interesting feature as one of its two main chimneys serves as electricity pylon.

== See also ==
- List of power stations in Russia
