= Kostroma Power Station =

Gas-fired power station in Kostroma, Russia

Kostromskaya Power Station
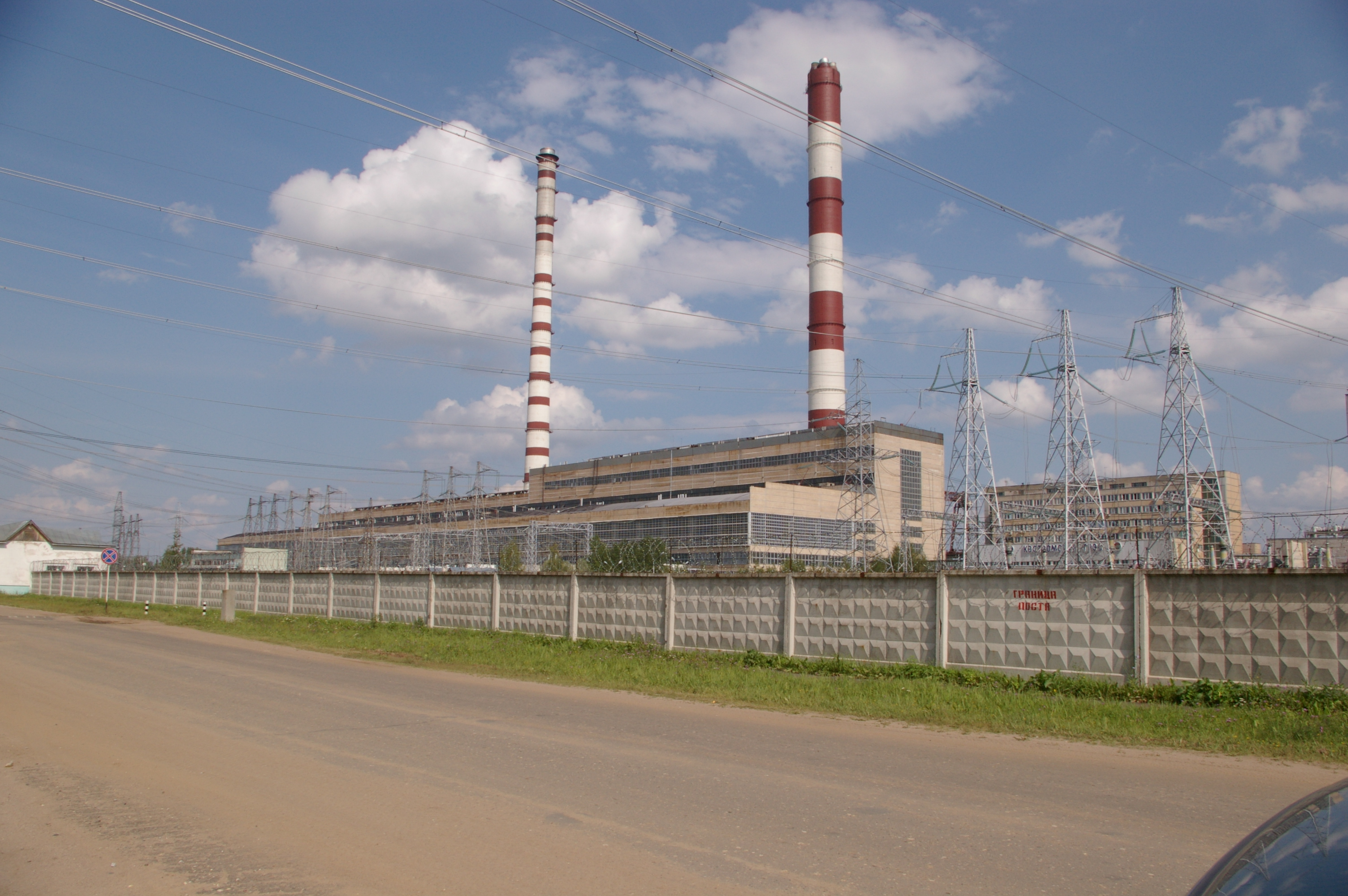
- Country: Russia
- Location: Volgorechensk
- Coordinates: 57°27′34″N 41°10′30″E
- Owner: WGC-3

Thermal power station
- Primary fuel: Natural gas

Power generation
- Units operational: 4 × 300MW; 4 × 330MW; 1 × 1,200MW
- Nameplate capacity: 3,720 MW

External links
- Website: irao-generation.ru/stations/kostromag/

The Kostroma Power Station (Kostromskaya GRES) is a gas-fired power station near Volgorechensk in Russia. The station consists of four 300-megawatt units, four 330-megawatt units and a single 1,200-megawatt unit, of which the 1,200 MW unit is the world's largest gas-fired power station unit. The station also has a 320 m (1,050 ft) tall chimney, one of the tallest in the world.

== See also ==
- List of largest power stations in the world
- List of natural gas power stations
- List of power stations in Russia
