= Ryazan Power Station =

Power station in Novomichurinsk, Ryazan, Russia

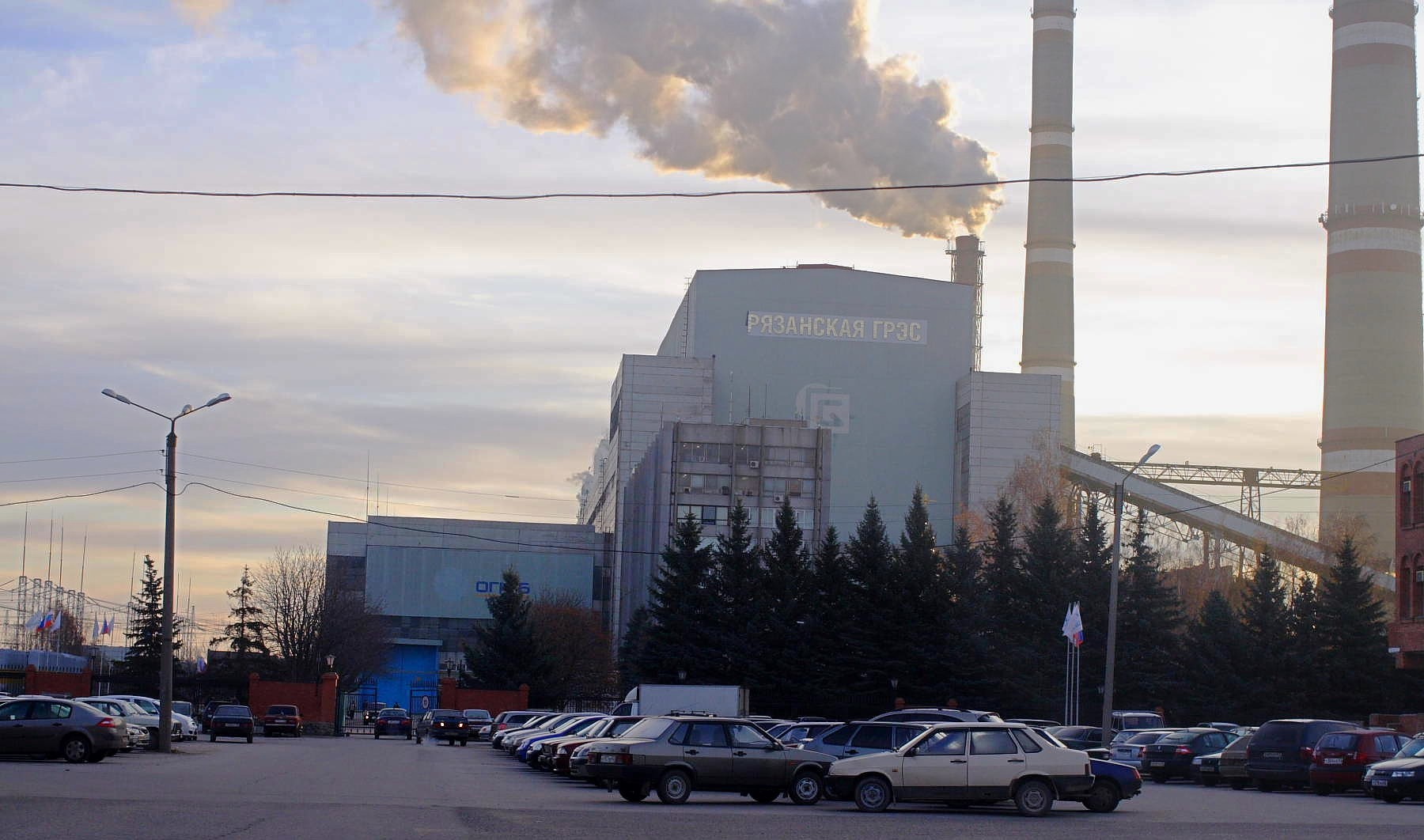
- Country: Russia
- Location: Novomichurinsk, Ryazan Oblast
- Coordinates: 54°02′04″N 39°46′39″E
- Status: Operational
- Commission date: 1971
- Owner: OGK-2

Thermal power station
- Primary fuel: Lignite; Natural gas

Power generation
- Units operational: 4 × 270 MW; 2 × 785 MW; 1 × 420 MW
- Nameplate capacity: 3,130 MW

External links
- Website: www.ogk2.ru/rus/branch/ryazangres/

The Ryazan Power Station (also called Novomichurinsk Power Station) is the fifth largest power station in Russia, with an installed capacity of 3,130 MW. The power station is located in Novomichurinsk of the Ryazan Oblast, Russia. It mainly fires lignite from the Moscow coal basin and the Kansk-Achinsk coal basins.

The facility houses one of the tallest chimneys in the world, topping out at 320 m (1,050 ft) in height and made from concrete. A second concrete chimney is only slightly lower, and two more chimneys 180 m (591 ft) in height are made from steel. Power is generated by four units of 300 MW, two units of 800 MW.

== History ==
Construction began in 1968 with the first unit going online in 1973.

The seventh unit (420 MW) was formerly known as GRES-24. It is situated nearby to the Ryazan GRES and joined into it in 2008. GRES-24 initially was built as first in the world power plant with magnetohydrodynamic generator, but in 1989 this project was cancelled and the plant was finished using traditional construction.

On 28 August 2024 the plant was reported to be on fire.

== See also ==
- List of largest power stations in the world
- List of power stations in Russia
