= Volgorechensk =

Town in Kostroma Oblast, Russia

Volgorechensk Волгореченск
- Town
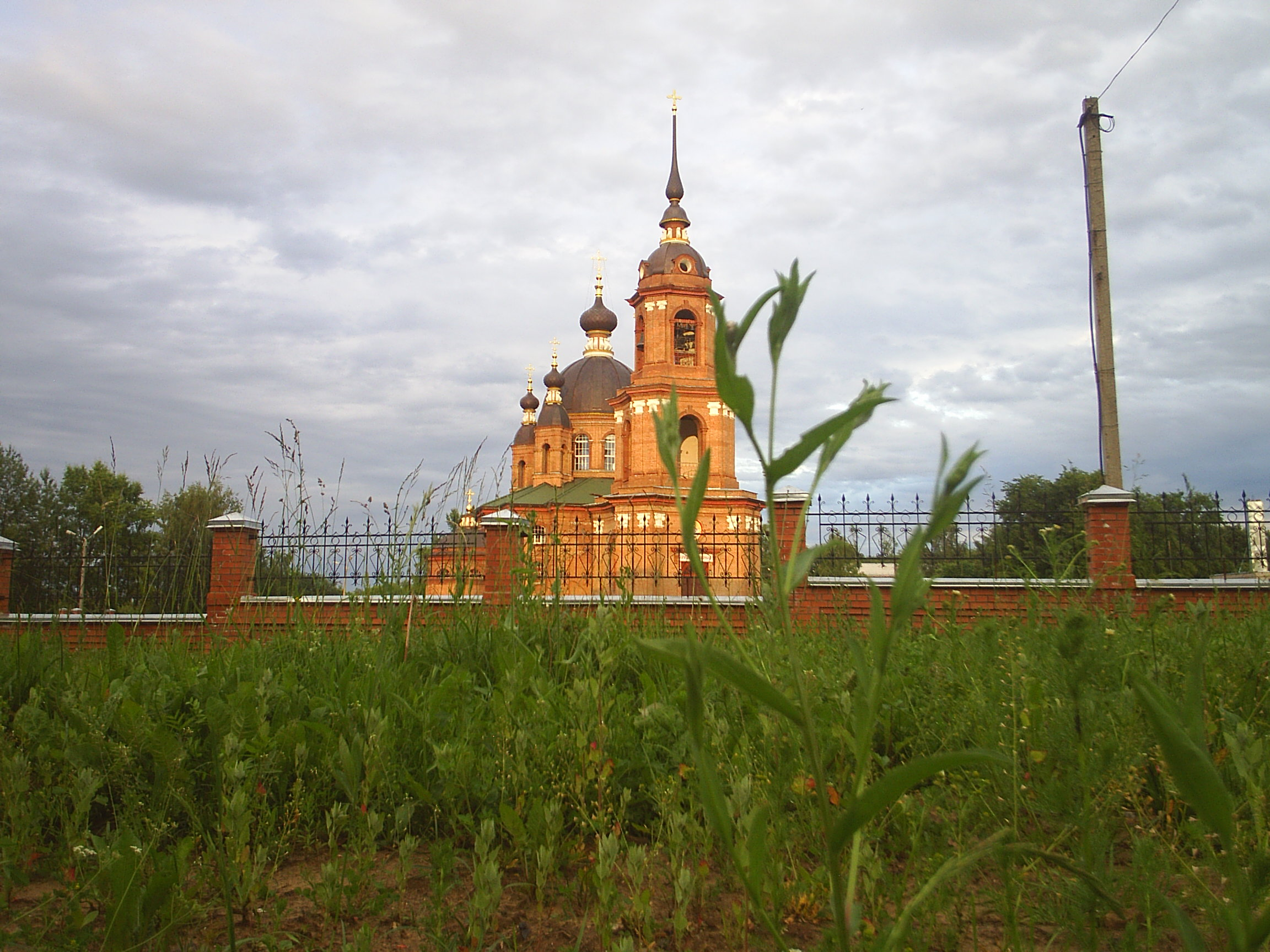
- Church in Volgorechensk

- Flag Coat of arms
- Interactive map of Volgorechensk
- Location of Volgorechensk Volgorechensk (Kostroma Oblast)
- Coordinates: 57°26′38″N 41°09′33″E
- Country: Russia
- Federal subject: Kostroma Oblast
- Founded: 1964
- Town status since: 2005
- Elevation: 110 m (360 ft)

Population (2010 Census)
  - Total: 17,104
  - Estimate (2021): 14,355 (−16.1%)

Administrative status
  - Subordinated to: town of oblast significance of Volgorechensk
  - Capital of: town of oblast significance of Volgorechensk

Municipal status
  - Urban okrug: Volgorechensk Urban Okrug
  - Capital of: Volgorechensk Urban Okrug
- Time zone: UTC+3 (MSK)
- Postal code: 156901
- Dialing code: +7 49453
- OKTMO ID: 34706000001
- Website: www.go-volgorechensk.ru

Volgorechensk (Russian: Волгоре́ченск) is a town in Kostroma Oblast, Russia, on the right bank of the Volga River, 40 kilometers (25 mi) south of Kostroma, the administrative center of the oblast. Population: 14,355 (2021 census); 17,104 (2010 census); 18,164 (2002 census); 15,966 (1989 Soviet census).

== History ==
The town was founded in 1964 as a settlement for the employees of the Kostroma Power Station. It was granted town status in 1994, and in 2005 the status of a city district.

== Administrative and municipal status ==
Within the framework of administrative divisions, it is, together with two rural localities, incorporated as the town of oblast significance of Volgorechensk—an administrative unit with the status equal to that of the districts. As a municipal division, the town of oblast significance of Volgorechensk is incorporated as Volgorechensk Urban Okrug.
