= Inter RAO =

Russian electricity company

PJSC Inter RAO UES

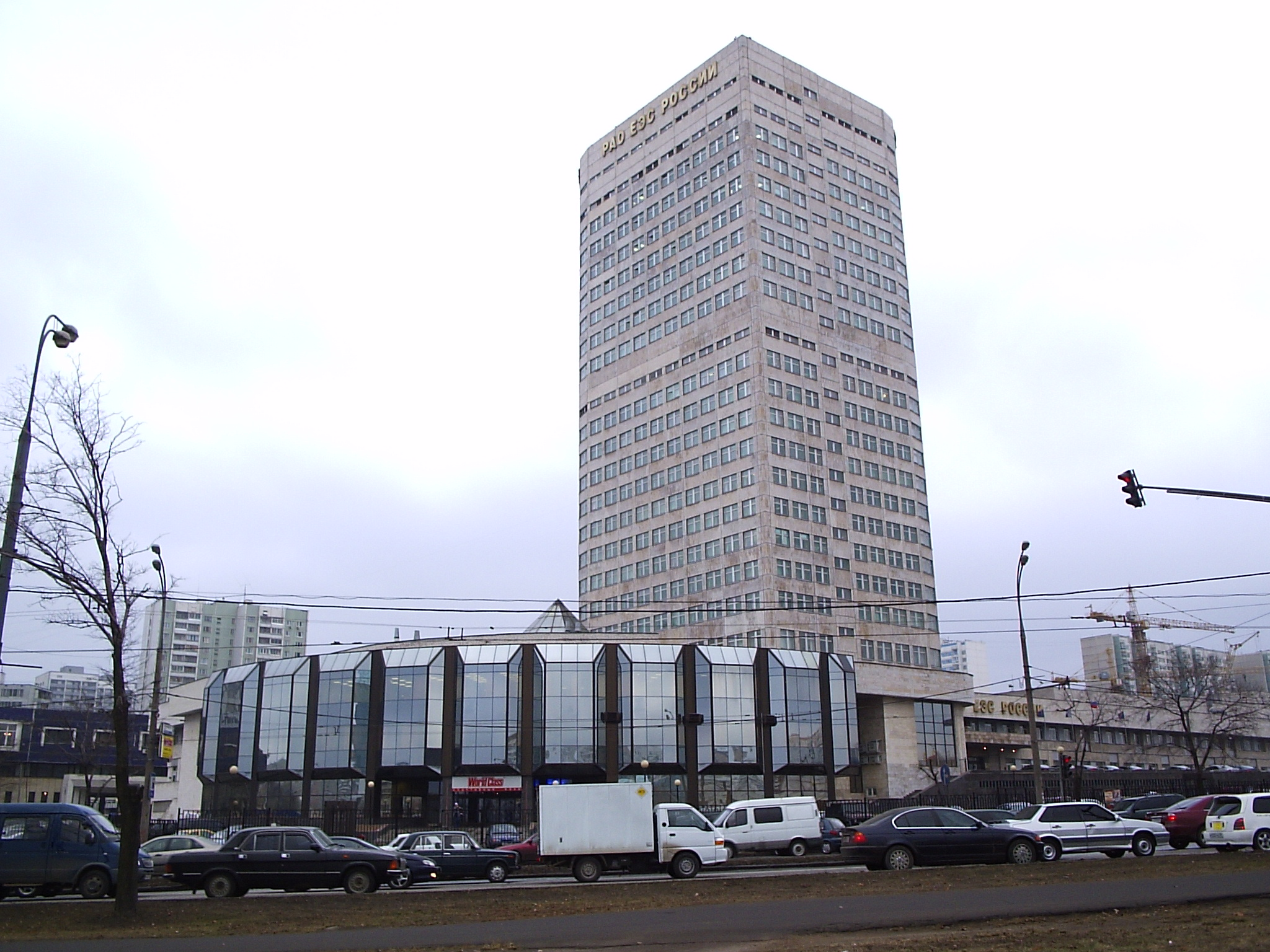
- Native name: ПАО Интер РАО ЕЭС
- Type: Public (ПAO)
- Traded as: MCX: IRAO
- Industry: Electricity
- Founded: 1997; 29 years ago
- Founder: RAO UES
- Headquarters: Moscow, Russia
- Key people: Boris Kovalchuk, (CEO); Igor Sechin (Chairman of the Board of Directors)
- Products: Electrical power Electric power infrastructure
- Services: Electricity generation and distribution International trading
- Revenue: $20.7 billion (2025)
- Operating income: $1.25 billion (2025)
- Net income: $1.57 billion (2025)
- Total assets: $18.5 billion (2025)
- Total equity: $13.4 billion (2025)
- Number of employees: 15,879
- Website: interrao.ru

Joint Stock Company Inter RAO UES (Russian: Публичное акционерное общество «ИНТЕР РАО ЕЭС», short form: Inter RAO), traded as, is a diversified energy holding company headquartered in Moscow, Russia. Its business includes power and heat generation, electricity supply, international energy trading, engineering, design, and development of electric power infrastructure. In addition to its assets in Russia, it controls several energy companies outside Russia, including thermal and hydropower plants, grid operators, and energy traders. It holds a monopoly on the export and import of electricity in Russia.

Inter RAO is one of the largest Russian public energy companies by market capitalization, which exceeded US$10.5 billion at the end of 2011. In fiscal year 2011, the company reported a revenue of US$18.24 bn (versus US$15.28 bn in 2010) and net income of $1.41 bn (vs $614 million in 2010). At the end of 2011, Inter RAO Group had more than 47,000 employees. In 2021, the company's revenue amounted to 89 billion rubles.

== History ==
Inter RAO was established in 1997 as a subsidiary of the Russian unified power company RAO UES. Its initial focus was international energy trading.

In 2002, Inter RAO started exporting electricity from Russia and generating its own electricity.

In 2005, Inter RAO made several acquisitions:

- 50% stake in Ekibastuz GRES-2 Power Station
- 25% plus 1 shares North-West Thermal Power Plant
- 70% stake in TGR Energy
- 51% stake in the Cuciurgan power station

In early 2008, Inter RAO obtained listings on the Russian stock exchanges Moscow Interbank Currency Exchange (MICEX) and Russian Trading System (RTS). As part of its reorganization, Inter RAO acquired several Russian power generation facilities, including the Sochi Thermal Power Plant, North-West Thermal Power Plant, Ivanovo CCPP, and Kaliningrad CHPP-2. In the same year, Inter RAO purchased the remaining 49% stake in the Cuciurgan power station.

In the following years, the Government of Russia transferred the power companies' shares remaining after the reform of RAO UES to the property of state-owned companies RusHydro, FGC UES, Federal Agency for State Property Management (Rosimushchestvo), and Rosneftegaz to Inter RAO. That included transfer of 41% stake in Irkutskenergo, 65.8% of OGK-1, 3.24% of OGK-4, 26.43% of OGK-5, 24.9% of TGC-6, 34.21% of TGC-7, 30.54% of TGC-11, 20.24% of Kuzbassenergo, 21.27% of Bashkirenergo, 14.48% of Sangtuda 1 Hydroelectric Power Plant (in Tajikistan), and 100% of Hrazdan Thermal Power Plant (in Armenia).

In 2009, Inter RAO shares were included in the MSCI EM Index. At the end of 2009, INTER RAO was ranked fifth in S&P Global Ratings informational transparency rating of the Russian energy companies.

In June 2018, board member Karina Tsurkan was arrested by the Federal Security Service on allegations of spying on behalf of Romania.

On 13 May 2022, Inter RAO subsidiary RAO Nordic announced that it would suspend deliveries of electricity to Finland and stopped them at midnight. The announcement came one day after Finland's president Sauli Niinistö and prime minister Sanna Marin had expressed their support for Finnish membership in the North Atlantic Treaty Organization (NATO). The move fits an ongoing pattern of economic sanctions and counter-sanctions in the wake of the 2022 Russian invasion of Ukraine.

== Shareholders ==
Major shareholders of Inter RAO are Russian state-owned entities. As of August 2018, shareholders of Inter RAO were:

- Rosneftegaz – 27.63%
- FGC UES – 9.24%
- Inter RAO Capital – 29.39%
- Freely traded (minority shareholders) – 33.74%

Boris Kovalchuk was appointed acting chairman in 2009, and was the CEO of Inter RAO from 2010–2024.

== Operations ==
=== Electricity generation ===
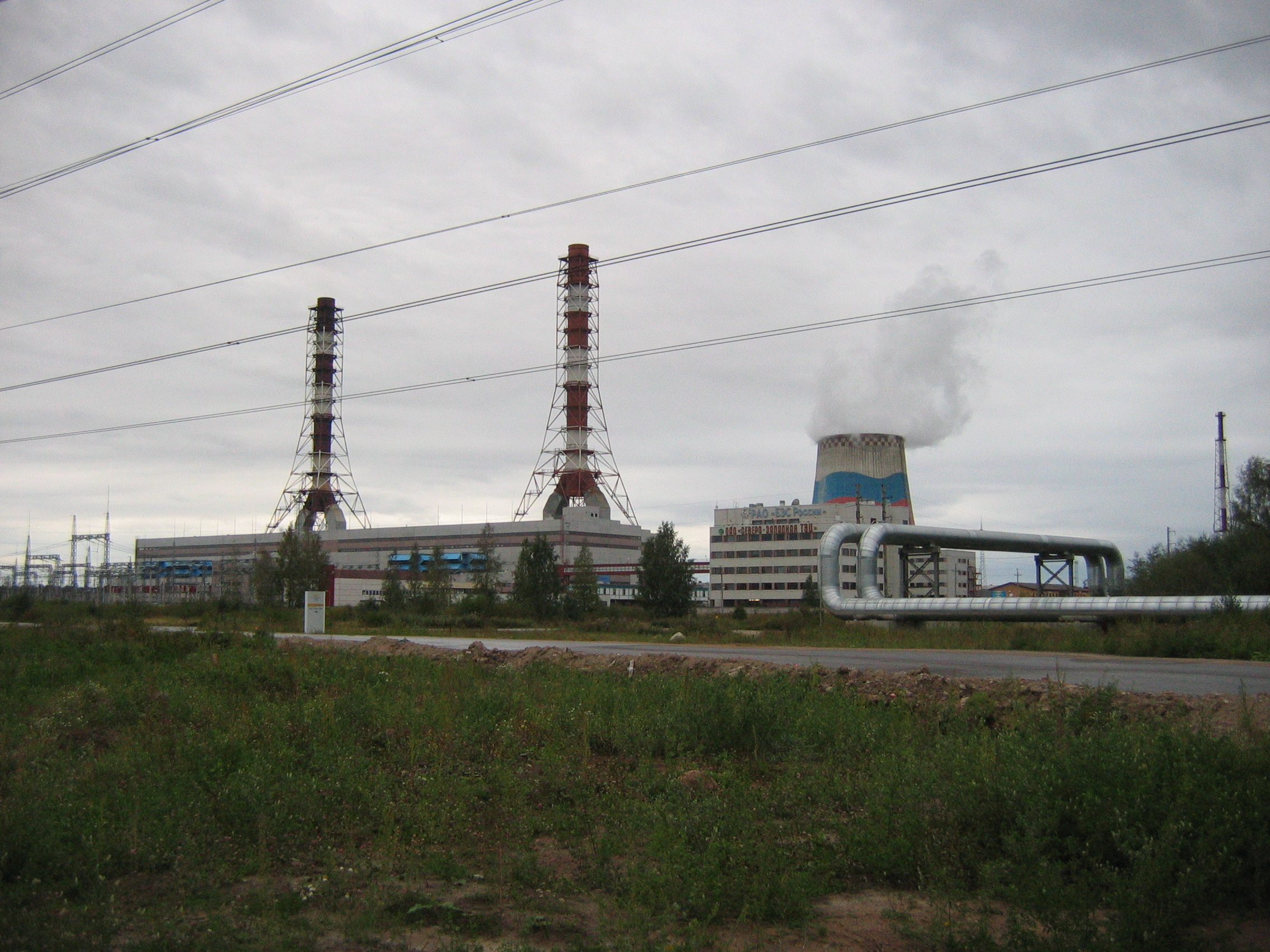
North-West Thermal Power Plant, St.Petersburg

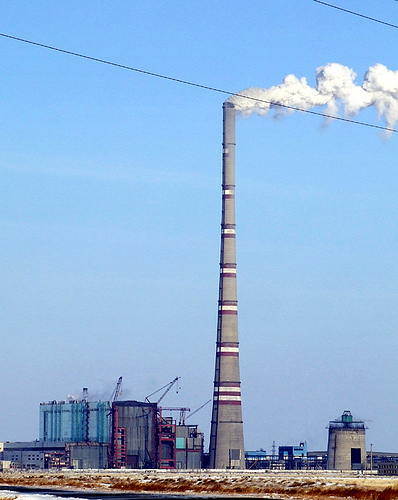
Ekibastuz GRES-2 Power Station, Kazakhstan

The combined installed capacity of power plants operated by Inter RAO Group is approximately 28 GW. Inter RAO UES controls the following power generation assets.

Russian power generating assets
Asset	Location	Capacity
INTER RAO - Electric Power Plants	Russia	2283 MW
OGK-1	Russia	9861 MW
OGK-3	Russia	8357 MW
TGK-11	Russia	1971 MW
Ivanovo CCPP	Russia	110 MW

Power generation assets in other countries
Asset	Location	Capacity
Hrazdan TPP	Armenia	1110 MW
Mtkvari TPP	Georgia	600 MW
Khrami HPP-1	Georgia	112,8 MW
Khrami HPP-2	Georgia	114,4 MW
Ekibastuz GRES-2 Power Station	Kazakhstan	1000 MW
Cuciurgan power station	Moldova	2520 MW
Vydmantai Wind Park	Lithuania	30 MW
Sangtuda 1 Hydroelectric Power Plant	Tajikistan	670 MW

=== Trading ===
The main export markets for INTER RAO are Finland, Lithuania, and Belarus.

The following Inter RAO subsidiaries are responsible for international energy trading:

- Eastern Energy Company (focused on export of Russian electricity to China)
- RAO Nordic Oy (Finland)
- TGR Enerji (Turkey)
- Inter RAO Lietuva (Lithuania)

From October 2021, Inter RAO increased its supply of electricity to China by 90% up from the planned amount, within the terms of the 25-year agreement of 2012 with State Grid Corporation of China. At the end of the same month, China requested nearly double the amount of supplied electricity from "Inter RAO" by the end of the year 2021. According to Alexandra Panina, board member of Inter RAO, the request of Chinese partners would be ratified almost completely.

In October 2021, Inter RAO announced its intention to supply electricity to Kazakhstan in November, due to the "in-house" deficiency in the country.

On 14 May 2022, RAO Nordic released a statement saying it was halting the import of power into Finland due to a lack of payment. Power transmission halted at 2200 GMT 14 May 2022.

=== Power supply ===
Inter RAO Group operates seven Russian power supply companies.

Asset	Location
Moscow Power Supply Company	Moscow, Russia
St. Petersburg Power Supply Company	Saint Petersburg, Russia
Altai Power Supply Company	Altai Krai, Russia
Saratovenergo	Saratov Oblast, Russia
Tambov Power Supply Company	Tambov Oblast, Russia
INTER RAO - Oryol Power Supply Company	Oryol Oblast Russia
RN Energo	Moscow, Russia
Power Grids of Armenia	Armenia
Telasi	Georgia

=== Electric power distribution grids ===
INTER RAO Group controls two distribution grid companies in the South Caucasus, Power Grids of Armenia and Telasi.

Asset	Location	Grid Length	Number of consumers (thousands)
Power Grids of Armenia	Armenia	30 335 km	950
Telasi	Georgia	3 930 km	466.9

=== Engineering ===
Inter RAO developed its engineering business as a key component of its integrated business model. In engineering, Inter RAO planned to focus on the design of energy infrastructure, coordination of construction, delivery and installation of equipment, installation, configuration, and maintenance services, as well as the manufacturing of boiler and turbine equipment. The company asserted that the initiatives of its engineering business would help Inter RAO secure at least 20% of the thermal power plant engineering, construction, and equipment market.

Main engineering businesses within Inter RAO Group
Asset	Location	Profile
INTER RAO-Engineering	Russia	Coordination of Group's engineering projects
Quartz Group	Russia	Construction of infrastructure facilities, all types of energy equipment repairs
Dominanta Group	Russia	Construction and operation of small generators
Joint Venture with GE and UK ODK	Russia	Manufacturing and sales of gas turbines
Joint Venture with WorleyParsons	Russia	Import of leading edge technologies to Russia
