= Kirishi Power Station =

Power station in Kirishi, Kirishsky, Leningrad, Russia

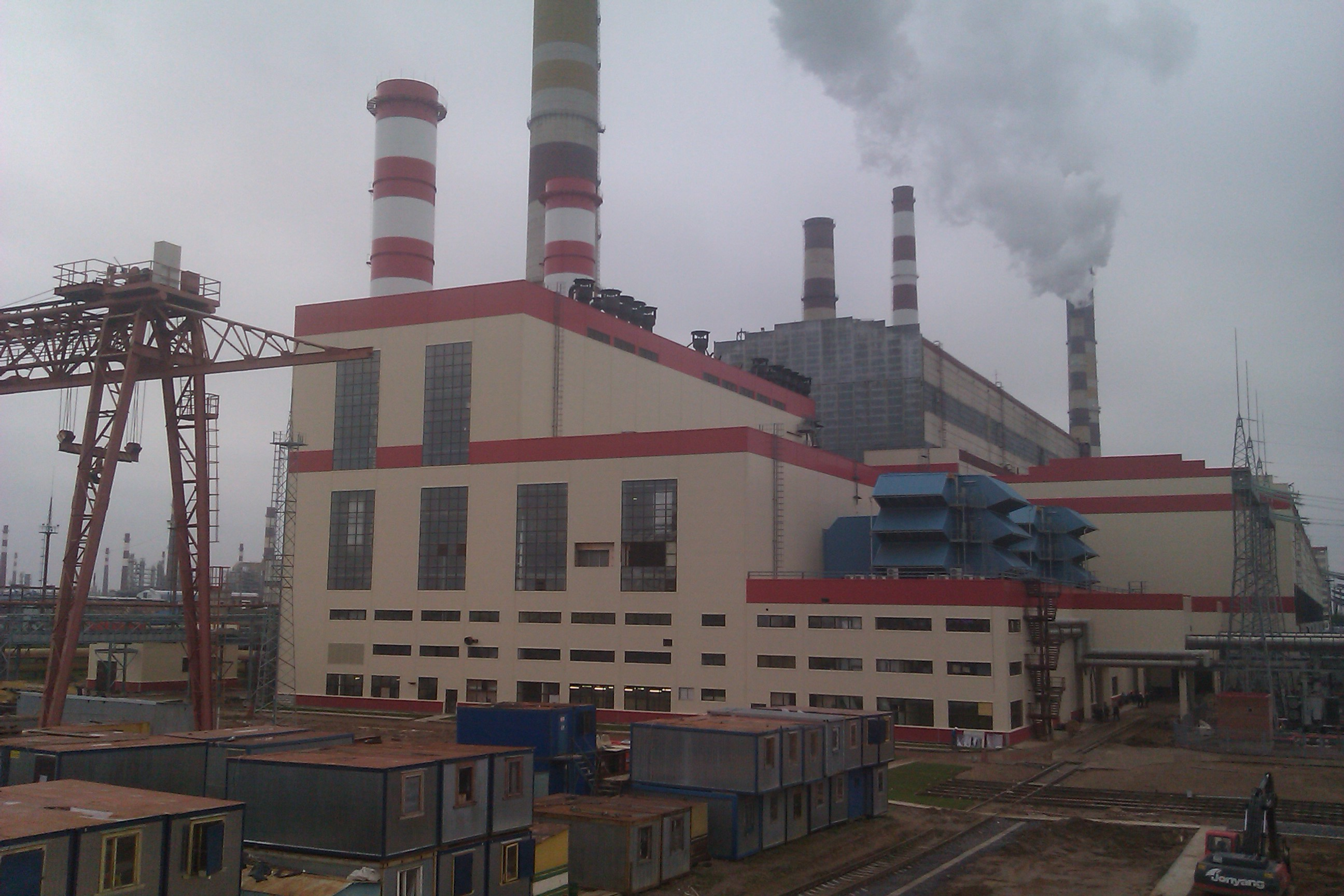
- Location of the Kirishi Power Station in Leningrad Oblast, Russia.
- Official name: Киришская ГРЭС
- Country: Russia
- Location: Kirishi
- Coordinates: 59°29′9″N 32°2′56″E
- Status: Operational
- Construction began: 1961
- Commission date: 1967
- Owner: OGK-6

Thermal power station
- Primary fuel: Natural gas
- Secondary fuel: Fuel oil

Power generation
- Units operational: 1 x 800 MW; 5 x 300 MW; 2 x 60 MW; 2 x 50 MW; 2 x 40 MW
- Make and model: LMZ, Siemens AG
- Nameplate capacity: 2,595 MW

External links
- Website: www.ogk6.ru
- Commons: Related media on Commons

Kirishi Power Station (Russian: Киришская ГРЭС) is a thermal power station (GRES) at the town of Kirishi, Kirishsky District, Leningrad Oblast, Russia. The power plant is located adjacent to a larger Kirishi oil refinery. Installed electrical capacity of the power station reached 2595 MW after completion of modernization program for unit 6 in 2011, which included installation of two gas turbines for this unit to utilize combined cycle with total increase of capacity 500 MW and efficiency 20%. The heating capacity is 1,234 Gcal/h.

Kirishskya GRES has two 320 metres (1,050 ft) tall flue gas stacks, they belong to the tallest chimneys at Russia.

== History ==
On 24 September 1960, the Council of Ministers of the Soviet Union passed a resolution for the construction of Kirishi Oil Refinery and the power station. The construction began in 1961.

== See also ==
- List of power stations in Russia
