= OGK-3 =

Russian power company

JSC The Third Generation Company of Wholesale Electric Market – (JSC WGC-3)
- Native name: OAO Оптовая генерирующая компания No. 3
- Romanized name: OAO Optovaya Generiruyushchaya Kompaniya 3
- Company type: Public (OAO)
- Industry: Electricity
- Predecessor: RAO UES
- Founded: 2004
- Defunct: 2012
- Fate: Merged into Inter RAO
- Successor: Inter RAO
- Headquarters: Ulan Ude, Moscow, Russia
- Key people: Maxim Kuznetsov (CEO)
- Products: Electrical power and heat
- Revenue: ▲US$1.2 billion (2010)
- Number of employees: 6,000
- Parent: Inter RAO
- Website: www.ogk3.ru

OGK-3 (meaning: The Third Generation Company of the Wholesale Electricity Market – WGC-3) was a Russian power company. The stock was traded on the MICEX-RTS stock exchange.

== History ==
OGK-3 was formed in 2004 by merger of six electricity generation companies as a part of restructuring of RAO UES, Russian state-controlled energy holding company. In 2007, after emission of its new shares, Norilsk Nickel became the largest shareholder in the company.

In 2008, OGK-3 acquired 24.99% in Rusia Petroleum, an operator of the Kovykta gas field. However, in 2010 Rusia Petroleum went bankruptcy.

In December 2010, it was announced that Inter RAO will acquire Norilsk Nickel's stake in OGK-3 increasing its stake in the company up to 85%. In 2012, OGK was merged into Inter RAO.

== Operations ==
OGK-3 owned following power stations:

- Kostroma SDPP – 3,600 MW
- Pechora SDPP – 1,060 MW
- Cherepetsk SDPP – 1,425 MW
- Kharanorsk SDPP – 430 MW
- Gusinoozersk SDPP – 1,100 MW
- Yuznouralsk SDPP – 882 MW.

The company's registered office is in Ulan Ude in Buryatia, the headquarters are located in Moscow.
