= OGK-1 =

OJSC OGK-1
- Native name: OAO Оптовая генерирующая компания № 1
- Romanized name: OAO Optovaya Generiruyushchaya Kompaniya 1
- Company type: Public (OAO)
- Industry: Power generation
- Predecessor: RAO UES
- Founded: 2005
- Defunct: 2012
- Fate: Merged into Inter RAO
- Successor: Inter RAO
- Headquarters: Moscow, Russia
- Key people: Boris Kovalchuck, (CEO)
- Products: Power and heat
- Revenue: ▲US$1.7 billion (2011)
- Net income: ▲US$143.3 million (2011)
- Number of employees: 5,800
- Parent: Inter RAO
- Website: www.ogk1.com

The First Generation Company of the Wholesale Electricity Market (OGK-1) was a large Russian company formed by the merger of six electricity generation companies.

== History ==
The company was established in 2005 by merging six power plants into one company. Before 1 July 2008, about 92% of the company's shares was owned by RAO UES, Russian state-controlled energy holding company. As a result of the electricity market reform, 43% of shares was transferred to the Federal Grid Company of Russia, 23% to RusHydro, and 34% was distributed to minority shareholders.

On March 17, 2009 the rights under 61,9% of voting shares were transferred to Inter RAO UES for 5 years with the right for extension for the same period. Starting from July 6, 2009 the powers of the sole executive body of OGK-1 were transferred to Inter RAO UES. In 2012, OGK-1 was merged into Inter RAO.

== Operations ==
OGK-1 operates following power stations:

- Permskaya GRES – 2,400 MW,
- Nizhnevartovskaya GRES – 1,600 MW
- Iriklinskaya GRES – 2,430 MW
- Kashirskaya GRES - 1,580 MW
- Verkhne-Tagilskaya GRES – 1,497 MW
- Urengoyskaya GRES - 24 MW.

The installed capacity of these power stations is about 9,500 MW. This comprises about 5.5% of the generating capacity of RAO UES.

The power output of the OGK-1 power plants in 2006 was around 48 TW.
