= Rosseti =

Russian electricity company

PAO Rosseti
- Native name: ПAO Россети
- Company type: Public (PAO)
- Traded as: MCX: RSTI
- Industry: Electricity
- Founded: 2008
- Headquarters: Moscow, Russia
- Key people: Nikolay Nikoalevich Shvets (CEO)
- Products: Electric power
- Services: Electric power distribution
- Revenue: $15.9 billion (2019)
- Operating income: $2.34 billion (2019)
- Net income: $1.63 billion (2019)
- Total assets: $103 billion (2019)
- Total equity: $24.5 billion (2019)
- Owner: Federal Agency for State Property Management (88%)
- Website: www.rosseti.ru/eng

PAO Rosseti (ПAO Россети) is a Russian power company, and comprises interregional and regional distribution grid companies (IDGCs/RDGCs), research and development institutes, design and construction institutes, and construction and sales entities. Ninety-seven subsidiaries of IDGCs/RDGCs are based in 69 constituent entities of the Russian Federation. The company was created as a result of the reorganization of RAO UES.

== Operations ==
Rosseti's property portfolio comprises interests in 44 joint-stock subsidiaries and affiliates, including interests in 11 IDGCs and 5 RDGCs. Shares in IDGC Holding are held by more than 330 thousand shareholders. The controlling shareholder is the Government (53.69% as of 31 March 2011).

The operational area of IDGC Holding companies covers a power network of ten voltage types, ranging from 0.4 kV to 220 kV. The total spread of networks of IDGC Holding's operating subsidiaries exceeds 2.1 million kilometers. Russian Grids ranks among the world's largest electric grid companies in terms of network spread and customers.

In 2010, the total power transmission was 591 billion kWh.

Rosseti companies invested 87.023 billion rubles (inclusive of VAT) in the development of electric grid facilities in 2010. In 2011, it is planned to invest about 146 billion rubles in the implementation of the Investment Program.

The main projects under the IDGC Holding consolidated investment program for 2011 are as follows:

- Construction of electric grid facilities for the Sochi Olympic infrastructure;
- "Renovation of 6–110-kV Cable Power Line" Program for Saint Petersburg;
- Integrated program of measures to reduce excessive losses in the North Caucasus;
- Implementation of the external electricity supply for the Raspadskaya mine, the enhancement of reliability of the electricity supply for the Mezhdurechensk District in the Kemerovo Region;
- Electricity supply measures for the AMUR Federal Chita–Khabarovsk Motorway;
- Network connection facilities for OOO Gazprom Invest Zapad;
- Salekhard 220-kV substation and Nadym–Salekhard 220-kV overhead transmission line.

It's listed on Moscow Exchange, the main Russian stock exchange. In 2021, the company's revenue amounted to 25 billion rubles.
