= Kansk-Achinsk coal basin =

The Kansk-Achinsk coal basin (Канско-Ачинский угольный бассейн) is a lignite coal basin located in the Krasnoyarsk territory and partly in the Kemerovo and Irkutsk regions.

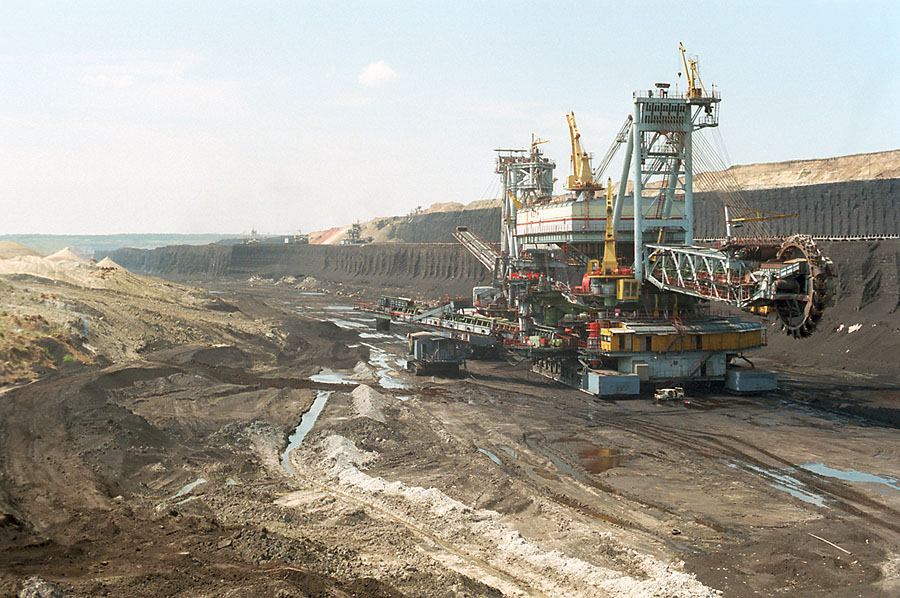
Surface mining in the Berezovsky-1 section

The Central-Siberian basin has the most significant reserves of open-pit mined brown-coal. Its share in national coal production was 12%, second only to the Kuznetsk basin with 52%.
