= Unipro (company) =

Russian power generation company

Unipro PJSC
- Native name: ПАО Юнипро
- Formerly: E.ON Russia
- Type: Public
- Traded as: MCX: UPRO
- Industry: Electricity
- Founded: 2006; 20 years ago
- Headquarters: Surgut, Russia
- Key people: Ruslan Lidzar (CEO); Sergei Tazin (chairman)
- Products: Electric power Thermal energy
- Revenue: $1.6 billion (2025)
- Operating income: $373 million (2025)
- Net income: $47 million (2025)
- Total assets: $2.85 billion (2025)
- Total equity: $2.67 billion (2025)
- Number of employees: 4,300 (2023)
- Parent: Uniper (until 2023)
- Website: Official website

Unipro (АО Юнипро, former names: E.ON Russia, The Fourth Generation Company of the Wholesale Electricity Market or OGK-4) is a Russian power generation company formed by the merger of five generation companies. 83.73% of the company is owned by the German energy company Uniper, and the rest of the shares are owned by minority shareholders. Till 2023, General Director — Maxim Shirokov, from April 2023 - Vasily Nikonov, from February 2026 - Ruslan Lidzar.

== History and operations ==
Unipro was founded in 2006 with the merger of the following power plants:

- Surgut-2 Power Station – 5,600 MW,
- Berezovskaya GRES – 1,550 MW
- Shatura Power Station – 1,500 MW
- Smolenskaya GRES – 630 MW
- Yajvinskaya GRES – 1,016 MW

The installed capacity of all five thermal power plants is about 10,296 MW, which comprises about 5% of the generating capacity of RAO UES.

The output of the Unipro power plants in 2007 was approximately 54.5 TWh. According to the current investment program, plans are in place to increase the original capacity of the power plants by 9.03 GW to more than 11 GW by 2011, with spending on these purposes totaling US$2.89 billion.

In April 2023, the Russian Federal Agency for State Property Management took temporary control of assets belonging to Unipro in retaliation for the seizure of Russian assets abroad.

== Performance indicators ==
Electricity generation by power plants belonging to the company:

Electricity generation, million kWh	2010	2011	2012	2013	2014	2015	2016	2017	2018	2019	2020	2021	2022
Surgut State Regional Power Plant-2	36 623	38 829	39 967	39 850	37 886	32 836	35 746	31 963	30 437	30 189,7	27 097	28 414	30 414
Berezovskaya State Regional Power Plant	9 288	11 082	10 738	10 020	9 049	8 971	7 057	6 458	5 495	6 492	4 339	4 504	10 941
Shatura State Regional Power Plant	4 112	5 893	5 185	5 311	4 969	4 899	5 306	3 849	4 669	4 137,2	4 499	6 224	6 507
Smolenskaya State Regional Power Plant	1 928	1 809	1 966	2 030	1 713	1 950	1 557	1 500	1 512	1 387	1 450	1967	1 465
Yayvinskaya State Regional Power Plant	3 840	4 854	6 345	5 784	5 621	5 111	4 864	4 473	4 536	4 227,4	4 362	4 125	4 626
Unipro	55 791	62 467	64 202	62 995	59 238	53 766	54 530	48 243	46 649	46 433	41 746	45 234	53 955
