= Novomichurinsk =

Town in Ryazan Oblast, Russia

Novomichurinsk Новомичуринск
- Town
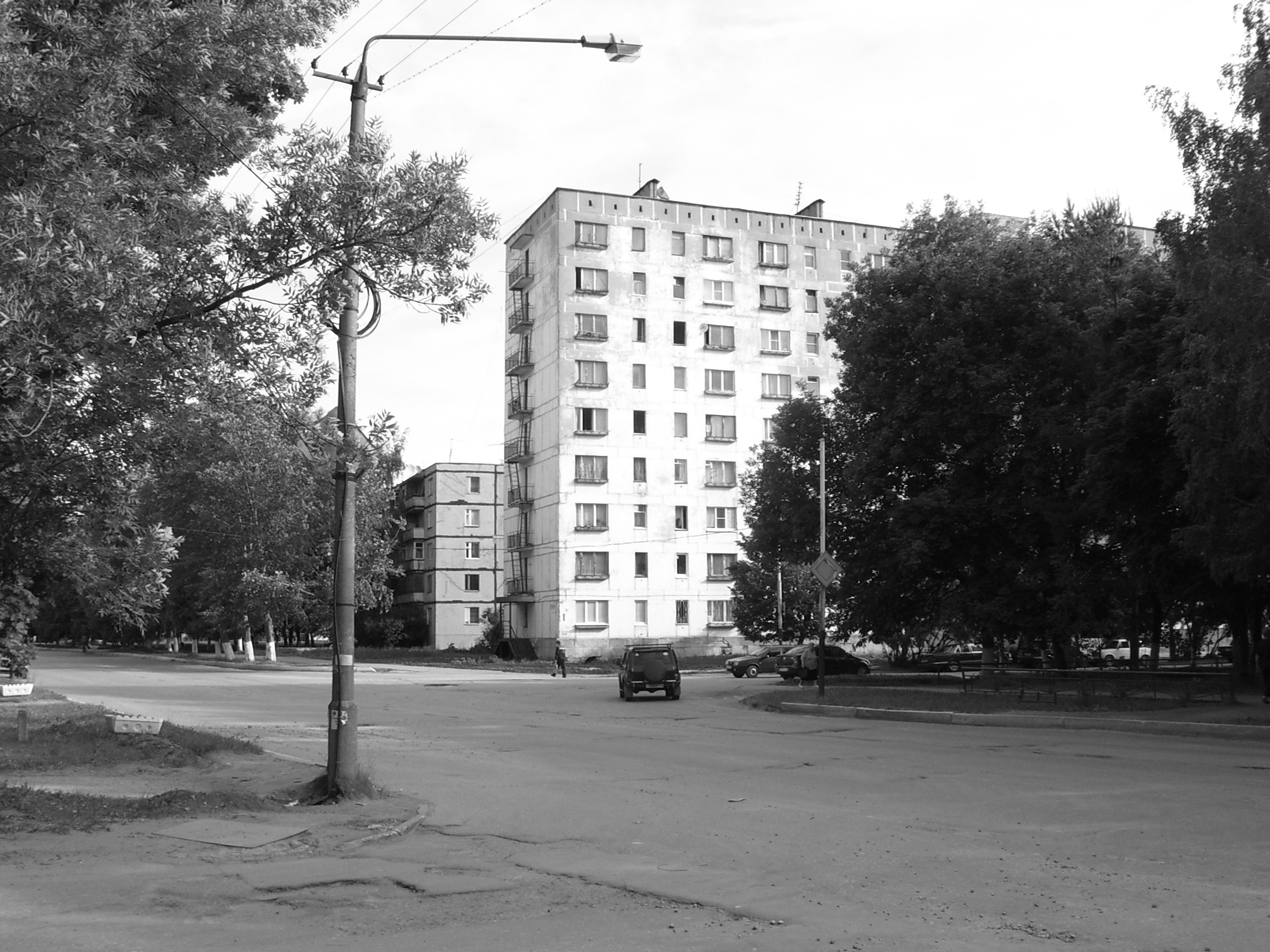
- A street in Novomichurinsk

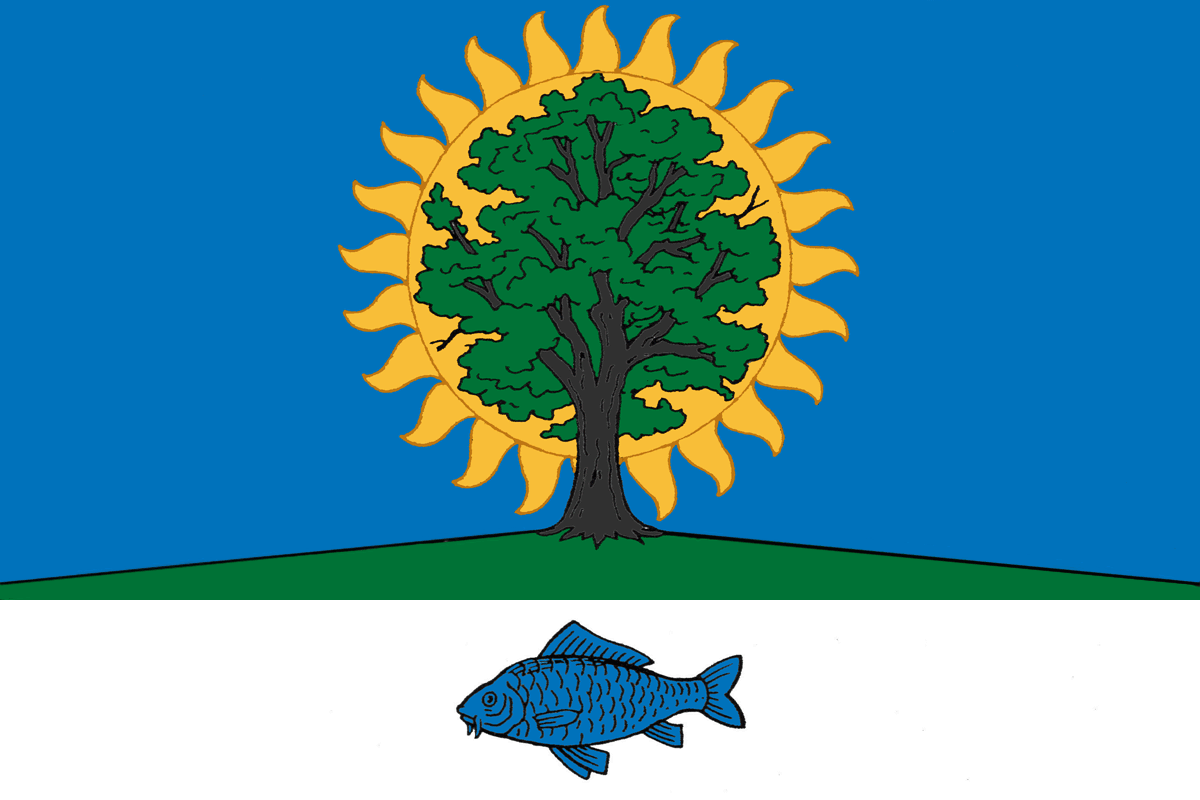
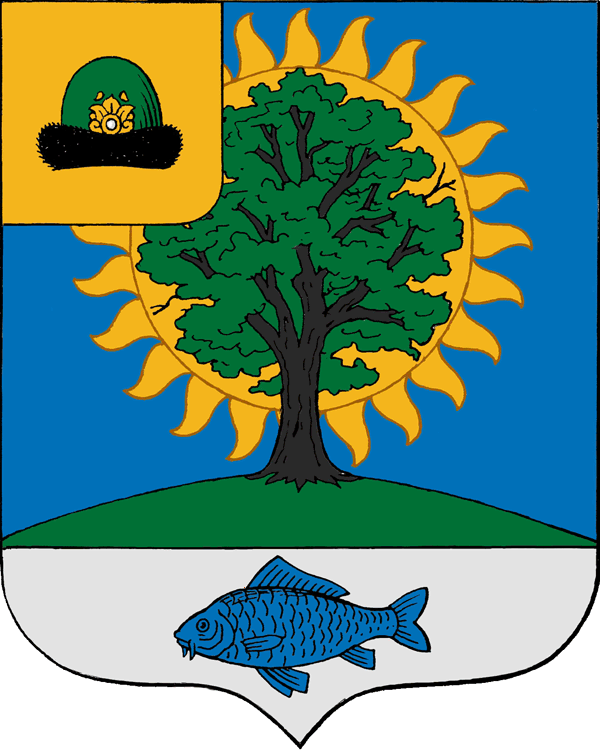
- Flag Coat of arms
- Interactive map of Novomichurinsk
- Location of Novomichurinsk Novomichurinsk (Ryazan Oblast)
- Coordinates: 54°03′N 39°43′E
- Country: Russia
- Federal subject: Ryazan Oblast
- Administrative district: Pronsky District
- Town of district significanceSelsoviet: Novomichurinsk
- Founded: 1968
- Town status since: 1981
- Elevation: 120 m (390 ft)

Population (2010 Census)
  - Total: 19,309
  - Estimate (2023): 16,752 (−13.2%)

Administrative status
  - Capital of: town of district significance of Novomichurinsk

Municipal status
  - Municipal district: Pronsky Municipal District
  - Urban settlement: Novomichurinskoye Urban Settlement
  - Capital of: Novomichurinskoye Urban Settlement
- Time zone: UTC+3 (MSK)
- Postal code: 391960
- OKTMO ID: 61625114001
- Website: admnovomich.ru

Novomichurinsk (Russian: Новомичу́ринск) is a town in Pronsky District of Ryazan Oblast, Russia, located on the Pronya River 85 kilometers (53 mi) south of Ryazan, the administrative center of the oblast. Population: 19,309 (2010 census); 20,743 (2002 census); 19,610 (1989 Soviet census).

== History ==
It was founded in 1968 and granted town status in 1981. It is named after Ivan Vladimirovich Michurin, who was born not far from this town.

== Administrative and municipal status ==
Within the framework of administrative divisions, it is incorporated within Pronsky District as the town of district significance of Novomichurinsk. As a municipal division, the town of district significance of Novomichurinsk is incorporated within Pronsky Municipal District as Novomichurinsk's Urban Settlement.

== Economy ==
Novomichurinsk is a company town of the Ryazan Power Station.

== Notable people ==
- Yuri Bykov (born 1981), filmmaker, screenwriter and actor
