= FGC UES =

Russian electricity grid operator

Federal Grid Company of Unified Energy System JSC
- Native name: ОАО Федеральная сетевая компания Единой энергетической системы
- Romanized name: Federalnaya Setevaya Companiya Edinoy Energeticheskoy Sistemy
- Company type: Public (OAO)
- Traded as: MCX: FEES; LSE: FEES
- ISIN: RU000A0JPNN9
- Industry: Energy
- Predecessor: RAO UES
- Founded: 2002
- Headquarters: Moscow, Russia
- Key people: Andrey Murov (CEO)
- Services: Electric power transmission
- Revenue: $3.86 billion (2019)
- Operating income: $1.59 billion (2019)
- Net income: $1.34 billion (2019)
- Total assets: $19.9 billion (2019)
- Total equity: $13.9 billion (2019)
- Owner: Rosseti (80.1%)
- Number of employees: 22,000 (2018)
- Parent: Rosseti
- Website: www.fsk-ees.ru

SOE FGC UES (Russian: Федеральная сетевая компания Единой энергетической системы, romanized: Federalinaya Setevaya Companiya Edinoy Energeticheskoy Sistemy, lit. 'Federal Grid Company of Unified Energy System') is a state-owned energy company based in Moscow, Russia. It is Russia's largest supplier of electrical power.

The company is listed on the Moscow and London stock exchanges with 80.13% of shares owned by Rosseti.

== History ==
In 2001, the Government of Russia reformed the Unified Energy System of Russia to create a unified national energy network, which includes a system of trunk lines, uniting most regions. For its operation, the Federal Grid Company (FGC UES) was created.

In November 2001, the Board of Directors of RAO UES defined the stages of creation of FGC UES. The company was established on 25 January 2002 as a subsidiary of RAO UES. The charter capital of UES FGC was 127 billion roubles. It was paid in cash and by transmission grids owned by RAO UES. UES FGC was registered on 25 June 2002.

On 1 July 2008, FGC UES was split off from RAO UES. At the same time, a single operating company was formed by merging with 54 companies that operated transmission systems of former regional power utilities. In November 2012, the majority of the company (79.55%) was transferred to the state-controlled holding company Rosseti.

== Operations ==
FGC UES owns, operates, and supervises 142,000 kilometres (88,000 mi) of the transmission grids in Russia. It also provides services to the wholesale electricity market in Russia. It owns an 8.57% stake in the energy company Inter RAO.

== Shareholders ==
According to regulations, the Russian Government should control at least 75% plus one share of the company. As of 31 December 2017, it controlled 80.13% through the holding company Rosseti and 0.59% through the holding company Rosimushchestvo, while minority shareholders owned 19.28%. These shares are freely traded at the Moscow Exchange and the London Stock Exchange.

== See also ==
- Energy policy of Russia
