= Sharypovo =

Sharypovo (Russian: Шарыпово) is the name of several inhabited localities in Russia.

== Modern localities ==
Urban localities

- Sharypovo, Krasnoyarsk Krai, a town in Krasnoyarsk Krai

Rural localities

- Sharypovo, Nizhny Novgorod Oblast, a village in Brilyakovsky Selsoviet of Gorodetsky District in Nizhny Novgorod Oblast

== Alternative names ==
- Sharypovo, alternative name of Sharipovo, a selo in Sharipovsky Selsoviet of Almenevsky District in Kurgan Oblast; 54°51′N 63°29′E
