= RAO UES =

Dissolved Russian energy company

OAO RAO UES Unified Energy System of Russia
- Trade name: RAO UES
- Native name: ОАО РАО «ЕЭС России»
- Company type: Public
- Traded as: RTS: EESR; MICEX: EESR
- Industry: Electricity
- Founded: August 15, 1992; 33 years ago
- Defunct: July 1, 2008
- Fate: Subsidiaries were separated and privatized, holding company was merged into UES FGC
- Successor: FGC UES
- Headquarters: Moscow, Russia
- Key people: Anatoly Chubais (chairman)
- Products: Electric power
- Services: Electric power transmission Electric power distribution
- Revenue: ₽40.4 trillion (1994; 1994)
- Number of employees: ~ 577,000

OAO RAO UES (OAO Unified Energy System of Russia; Russian: ЕЭС России or Russian: Единая Энергетическая Система) was an electric power holding company in Russia. It controlled about 70% of Russia's installed electric capacity, 96% of its high-voltage grid and over 70% of its transmission lines. In addition to the Russian market, RAO UES exported electricity to Scandinavia and to other members of the CIS. The last head of RAO UES was Anatoly Chubais.

== History ==
Unified Energy System of Russia was established by Presidential Decree #932, signed on August 15, 1992, as an electric energy holding company. Most of the state-owned electric energy assets, such as thermal and hydroelectric power plants, transmission lines, state-owned shares in power, research & engineering, and construction companies were transferred to RAO UES, with the exception of any assets related to nuclear energy. In total, RAO UES owned more than 70 of the energy companies and more than 40 of the power plants with federal-level importance. It also owned the transmission system operator, Federal Grid Company, (or, RAO FGC, the current successor of RAO UES and the operator of Russia's wide area transmission network) and the system operator of the Centralized Dispatching Administration (OAO SO-CDA). The first head of the company was Anatoly Dyakov, who held the positions of president and chairman of the director's council.

On May 30, 1997, shareholders abolished the position of president and appointed a chairman of the board, Boris Brevnov, who was a personal friend of First Deputy Prime Minister of the Russian Federation, Boris Nemtsov. On January 27, 1998, the director's council, headed by Anatoly Dyakov, removed Brevnov from his position. However, Brevnov did not recognize this action and removed Dyakov from his position instead. Eventually, former chief of the Russian presidential administration, Anatoly Chubais, was appointed chairman of the board; and the chief of the Russian presidential administration, Alexander Voloshin, was appointed chairman of the director's council (25 June 1999).

In the mid-2000s, RAO UES suffered several failures in trying to keep up with demand. These were due to the decade-long practice of disinvestment. The most significant failures were the 2005 Moscow power blackouts.

== Reorganization ==
The reorganization of RAO UES started in 2006. The first stage of the reorganization was completed on September 3, 2007, during which subsidiary generating companies, WGC-5 and TGC-5, were individually spun off from the parent RAO UES. During a second stage of reorganization, all remaining subsidiaries of RAO UES were spun off (by July 1, 2008).

This reorganization was seen as a massive privatization of the power industry, with the goal of attaining about US$79 billion in investments. Altogether, six wholesale generation companies (WGC), 14 territorial generation companies (TGC), RusHydro, FGC UES (Federal Grid Company), SO-CDA (System Operator), IDC Holding, RAO ES of the East, and Inter RAO UES continue to operate as independent entities.

The remaining RAO UES ceased to exist after its merger into UES FGC, a Federal Grid Company.

== Shareholders ==
The Russian Federation owned directly, or indirectly, over 50% of the shares in RAO UES. The rest of the stock was owned by minority shareholders. Shares were also traded on the MICEX and RTS stock exchanges.

== See also ==
- Energy policy of Russia
- Irkutskenergo
- RusHydro
