= List of tallest demolished freestanding structures =

Photos shot before and after the collapse of the World Trade Center during the September 11 attacks. The complex's twin towers were the tallest freestanding structures to be demolished.

This is a list of tallest demolished freestanding structures. To be freestanding, a structure must not be supported by guy-wires, the sea or other types of support. It therefore does not include guyed masts, partially guyed towers and drilling platforms, but does include towers, skyscrapers (pinnacle height) and chimneys.

== Demolished freestanding structures 198 m (650 ft) or taller ==
Structures with the same height are ordered by demolition date

Name	Pinnacle height (metres / feet)		Year built	Year removed	Type of structure	Main use	Country	Location	Remarks	Recording of event
1 World Trade Center	417 m	1,368 ft	1973	2001	Skyscraper	Office, observation	United States	New York City	Destroyed on September 11, 2001. Tallest freestanding structure that no longer exists. Tallest building in the world 1971–1973.	
2 World Trade Center	415.3 m	1,362 ft	1973	2001	Skyscraper	Office, observation	United States	New York City	Destroyed on September 11, 2001.	Video on YouTube
Chimney of Homer City Generating Station	370 m	1,217 ft	1969	2025	Chimney	Power station	United States	Homer City, Pennsylvania	Demolished on 22 March 2025 by explosives. Tallest freestanding structure ever demolished in a controlled manner, demolished by Controlled Demolition, Inc.	Video on YouTube
Chimney of Teruel Power Plant	343 m	1,125 ft	1981	2023	Chimney	Power station	Spain	Andorra, Teruel	Demolished on 16 February 2023 by explosives.	Video on YouTube
Chimney of Westerholt Power Station	337 m	1,106 ft	1981	2006	Chimney	Power station	Germany	Gelsenkirchen, North Rhine-Westphalia	Demolished on 3 December 2006 by explosives.	Video on YouTube
Original chimney of Gavin Power Plant	335 m	1,099 ft	1974	1990s	Chimney	Power station	United States	Cheshire, Ohio	The chimney remains partially standing but was shortened in the 1990s from its original height of 335 m (1,099 ft), which would have made it the tallest structure ever to undergo a height reduction at the time. Its alteration received little media coverage, likely because it was dismantled gradually rather than explosively demolished or fully removed. It now stands at approximately 152 m (499 ft).	
Turner Broadcasting tower	314.3 m	1,031 ft	1967	2010	Lattice tower	UHF/VHF-transmission	United States	Atlanta, Georgia	Dismantled in 2010. Tallest lattice tower to be demolished.	
Chimney of Harllee Branch Power Plant	307 m	1,007 ft	1978	2016	Chimney	Power station	United States	Milledgeville, Georgia	Demolished on 15 October 2016. Tallest multi-flue windscreen chimney ever demolished.	Video on YouTube
Chimney of Widows Creek Fossil Plant	305 m	1,001 ft	1980	2020	Chimney	Power station	United States	Stevenson, Alabama	Demolished on 3 December 2020.	Video on YouTube
Chimney of Marl-Chemiepark Power Station	300 m	984 ft	197?	1995	Chimney	Power station	Germany	Marl, North Rhine-Westphalia	Demolished in 1995.	
Chimney #1 of Boxberg Power Station	300 m	984 ft	1979	2000	Chimney	Power station	Germany	Boxberg, Saxony	Demolished in 2000.	
Chimney of Lippendorf Power Station	300 m	984 ft	1967	2005	Chimney	Power station	Germany	Lippendorf, Saxony	Demolished by explosives in 2005.	
Chimney #1 of Jänschwalde Power Station	300 m	984 ft	1981	2003	Chimney	Power station	Germany	Jänschwalde	Demolished by explosives 2002–2007.	
Chimney #2 of Jänschwalde Power Station	300 m	984 ft	1981	2005	Chimney	Power station	Germany	Jänschwalde	Demolished by explosives 2002–2007.	
Chimney #3 of Jänschwalde Power Station	300 m	984 ft	1981	2007	Chimney	Power station	Germany	Jänschwalde	Demolished by explosives 2002–2007.	
Chimney of Thierbach Power Station	300 m	984 ft	1968	?	Chimney	Power station	Germany	Espenhain, Saxony	Demolished.	
Chimney #2 of Boxberg Power Station	300 m	984 ft	1979	2009	Chimney	Power station	Germany	Boxberg, Saxony	Demolished in 2009.	Video on YouTube
Chimney #3 of Boxberg Power Station	300 m	984 ft	1979	2012	Chimney	Power station	Germany	Boxberg, Saxony	Demolished in 2009.	Video on YouTube
Chimney of Tušimice Power Station	300 m	984 ft	1974	2012	Chimney	Power station	Czech Republic	Tušimice	Dismantled in 2011–12.	
Chimney #4 of Boxberg Power Station	300 m	984 ft	1979	2012	Chimney	Power station	Germany	Boxberg, Saxony	Demolished in 2012.	
Chimney #3 of Matla Power Station	276 m	906 ft	1982	1982	Chimney	Power station	South Africa	Kriel	Demolished in 1982 after partially collapsing during construction.	Video on YouTube
Chimney of R.E. Burger Power Station	260 m	854 ft	19	2016	Chimney	Power station	United States	Dilles Bottom, Ohio	Demolished on 29 July 2016.	Video on YouTube
Chimney of Shawville Generating Station	259 m	850 ft	1972	2016	Chimney	Power station	United States	Shadyside, Ohio	Demolished in 2016.	
Moscow Octod Tower	258 m	846 ft	2006	2024	Lattice tower	UHF/VHF-transmission	Russia	Moscow	Dismantling began in 2022 and was completed by late 2024. It was the second-tallest lattice tower ever to be demolished.	
Chimney of Hamburg-Port	256 m	840 ft	?	2004	Chimney	?	Germany dismantling	Hamburg	Demolished in April 2004. Further damage occurred caused by miscalculation of debris trajectories from explosive demolition.	
Chimney of McDonough-Atkinson	254.5 m	835 ft	1960s	2013	Chimney	Power station	United States	Atlanta, Georgia	Dismantled in 2013.	
Chimney #2 of Yates Power Plant	253 m	830 ft	1974	2017	Chimney	Power station	United States	Newnan, Georgia	Demolished on 21 January 2017.	Video on YouTube Video on YouTube
Chimney #2 of ASARCO El Paso Smelter	252.5 m	828 ft	1967	2013	Chimney	Smelter	United States	El Paso, Texas	Demolished in April 2013.	Video on YouTube
Lafayette transmitter, Tower 1	250 m	820 ft	1918	1944	Lattice tower	UHF/VHF-transmission	France	Marcheprime	Demolished in 1944.	
Lafayette transmitter, Tower 2	250 m	820 ft	1918	1944	Lattice tower	UHF/VHF-transmission	France	Marcheprime	Demolished in 1944.	
Lafayette transmitter, Tower 3	250 m	820 ft	1918	1944	Lattice tower	UHF/VHF-transmission	France	Marcheprime	Demolished in 1944.	
Lafayette transmitter, Tower 4	250 m	820 ft	1918	1944	Lattice tower	UHF/VHF-transmission	France	Marcheprime	Demolished in 1944.	
Lafayette transmitter, Tower 5	250 m	820 ft	1918	1944	Lattice tower	UHF/VHF-transmission	France	Marcheprime	Demolished in 1944.	
Lafayette transmitter, Tower 6	250 m	820 ft	1918/1920	1944	Lattice tower	UHF/VHF-transmission	France	Marcheprime	Demolished in 1944.	
Lafayette transmitter, Tower 7	250 m	820 ft	1920	1944	Lattice tower	UHF/VHF-transmission	France	Marcheprime	Demolished in 1944.	
Lafayette transmitter, Tower 8	250 m	820 ft	1918/1920	1953	Lattice tower	UHF/VHF-transmission	France	Marcheprime	Disassembled in 1953.	
Bakar Eurco Chimney TE Rijeka	250 m	820 ft	1978	2005	Chimney	?	Croatia	Bakar	Demolished in 2005.	
Chimney #1 Dolna Odra Power Station	250 m	820 ft	1973	?	Chimney	Power station	Poland	Nowe Czarnowo	Disassembled.	
Chimney of Grain Power Station	244 m	801 ft	1979	2016	Chimney	Power station	United Kingdom	Isle of Grain, England	Demolished on 7 September 2016.	Video on YouTube
Chimney of Monroe Power Plant	244 m	800 ft	1970	2011–12	Chimney	Power station	United States	Monroe, Michigan	Slowly dismantled from 2011–12.	
Chimney of Monroe Power Plant	244 m	800 ft	1970	2014	Chimney	Power station	United States	Monroe, Michigan	Dismantled in 2014.	
Königs Wusterhausen Central Tower	243 m	797 ft	1925	1972	Lattice tower	UHF/VHF-transmission	Germany	Königs Wusterhausen	Collapsed during storm on 15 November 1972. Tallest freestanding structure to collapse in a storm.	
Kharkiv TV Tower	240.7 m	790 ft	1981	2024	Lattice tower	UHF/VHF-transmission	Ukraine	Kharkiv	Partially destroyed by a Russian airstrike on April 22, 2024. The upper half of the tower collapsed, but the lower half supported by the lattice structure remained standing.	
Chimney #1 Navajo Generating Station	236.2 m	775 ft	1997	2020	Chimney	Power station	United States	Page, Arizona	Demolished on 18 December 2020.	Video on YouTube
Chimney #2 Navajo Generating Station	236.2 m	775 ft	1998	2020	Chimney	Power station	United States	Page, Arizona	Demolished on 18 December 2020.	(see above)
Chimney #3 Navajo Generating Station	236.2 m	775 ft	1999	2020	Chimney	Power station	United States	Page, Arizona	Demolished on 18 December 2020.	(see above)
Chimney of Inverkip Power Station	236 m	774 ft	1976	2013	Chimney	Power station	United Kingdom	Inverkip, Scotland	Demolished on 28 July 2013.	Video on YouTube
Chimney of Power Station Schwandorf	235 m	771 ft	?	2005	Chimney	Power station	Germany	Schwandorf, Bavaria	Demolished in 2005.	
AXA Tower	235 m	771 ft	1986	2023	Skyscraper	Commercial	Singapore	Singapore	Demolished to make way for Skywaters Residences. Tallest building to ever be voluntarily demolished.	
Channel 9 TV Tower	233 m	764 ft	1965	2021	Lattice tower	UHF/VHF-transmission	Australia	Sydney	Disassembled in August 2021.	Video on YouTube
WOR TV Tower	231.65 m	760 ft	1949	1956	Lattice tower	UHF/VHF-transmission	United States	North Bergen, New Jersey	Dismantled after being struck by an aircraft in 1956.	
Chimney of Castrop-Rauxel Power Station	230 m	755 ft	1966	2008	Chimney	Power station	Germany	Castrop-Rauxel, North Rhine-Westphalia	Demolished in 2008.	
Chimneys of Heating Power Station Gera-Nord	225 m	738 ft	1984/1986	2010	Chimney	Power station	Germany	Gera, Thuringia	Demolished 2008–2010.	
Chimney of Schilling Power Station	220 m	722 ft	1962	2005	Chimney	Power station	Germany	Stade, Lower Saxony	Demolished in 2005.	
Yekaterinburg TV Tower	219 m	720 ft	1962	2018	Tower	Observation tower	Russia	Yekaterinburg	Demolished on 24 March 2018. Was originally intended to be 360 m (1,180 ft) tall.	Video on YouTube
Chimney of Pembroke Power Station	217.3 m	713 ft	1968	2000	Chimney	Power station	United Kingdom	Pembroke, Wales	Demolished on 25 November 2000.	
270 Park Avenue	216 m	708 ft	1960	2021	Skyscraper	Office	United States	New York City	Disassembled in 2020–21. Was the tallest building to ever be voluntarily demolished until 2023.	
Chimney of Littlebrook Power Station, Unit 'D'	215 m	705 ft	1981	2019	Chimney	Power station	United Kingdom	Dartford, Kent	Demolished in December 2019.	Video on YouTube
Chimney of Alma Power Station	213.5 m	700 ft	1960	2018	Chimney	Power station	United States	Alma, Wisconsin	Demolished on 1 October 2018.	Video on YouTube
Chimney Power Station Moers-Meerbeck	210 m	689 ft	?	1990's	Chimney	Power station	Germany	Moers–Meerbeck, North Rhine-Westphalia	Demolished early 1990s.	
Novosemeykino Longwave Transmission, Tower 1	205 m	673ft	1943	2010	Lattice tower	UHF/VHF-transmission	Russia	Novosemeykino	Demolished in 2010.	
Novosemeykino Longwave Transmission, Tower 2	205 m	673 ft	1943	2010	Lattice tower	UHF/VHF-transmission	Russia	Novosemeykino	Demolished in 2010.	
Novosemeykino Longwave Transmission, Tower 3	205 m	673 ft	1943	2010	Lattice tower	UHF/VHF-transmission	Russia	Novosemeykino	Demolished in 2010.	
Chimney Power Station Franken II	202 m	663 ft	1964	2001	Chimney	Power station	Germany	Erlangen, Bavaria	Demolished in 2001.	
Chimney of Považská Bystrica Old Power Station	201 m	659 ft	?	2016	Chimney	Power station	Slovakia	Považská Bystrica	Demolished in 2016.	
Chimney Ludwigshafen	200 m	656 ft	?	2002	Chimney	?	Germany	Ludwigshafen, Rhineland-Palatinate	Demolished in November 2002.	
Chimney Power Station Breitungen	200 m	656 ft	1986	2005	Chimney	Power station	Germany	Breitungen, Thuringia	Demolished in 2005.	
Chimney of Schwedt PCK-refinery	200 m	656 ft	?	2003	Chimney	Refinery	Germany	Schwedt, Brandenburg	Demolished in 2003.	
Chimney of Pątnów Power Station	200 m	656 ft	1967	2008	Chimney	Power station	Poland	Pątnów	Demolished in 2008.	
Manušice Chimney	200 m	656 ft	?	?	Chimney	?	Czech Republic	Česká Lípa	Demolished ?	
Chimney of Skalice u České Lípy	200 m	656 ft	?	?	Chimney	?	Czech Republic	Skalice u České Lípy	Demolished ?	
Chimney of Didcot A Power Station	199.5 m	654 ft	1968	2020	Chimney	Power station	United Kingdom	Didcot, Oxfordshire	Demolished in February 2020.	Video on YouTube
Chimney of Ohio Edison Toronto Power Plant	198 m	650 ft	19	2008	Chimney	Power station	United States	Toronto, Ohio	Demolition on 1 November 2008.	Video on YouTube
Port Kembla Copper Stack	198 m	650 ft	1965	2014	Chimney	Smelter	Australia	Port Kembla, New South Wales	Demolished on 20 February 2014.	Video on YouTube
Chimney #1 of Nanticoke Generating Station Units 1–4	198 m	650 ft	1972	2018	Chimney	Power station	Canada	Nanticoke, Ontario	Demolished on 28 February 2018.	Video on YouTube
Chimney #2 of Nanticoke Generating Station Units 5–8	198 m	650 ft	1972	2018	Chimney	Power station	Canada	Nanticoke, Ontario	Demolished on 28 February 2018.	(see above)
Chimney of Kingsnorth Power Station	198 m	650 ft	1970	2018	Chimney	Power station	United Kingdom	Hoo St Werburgh, Kent	Demolished in March 2018.	Video on YouTube
Chimney of St. Johns River Power Park	198 m	650 ft	1988	2019	Chimney	Power station	United States	Jacksonville, Florida	Demolished on 23 July 2019.	Video on YouTube
Chimney of Consumers Energy B.C. Cobb Plant	198 m	650 ft	?	2020	Chimney	Power station	United States	Muskegon, Michigan	Disassembled in 2019–20.	Video on YouTube
Chimneys of Ferrybridge C Power Station	198 m	650 ft	1966	2020	Chimney	Power station	United Kingdom	Ferrybridge, West Yorkshire	Demolition in 2020.	Video on YouTube
Chimney of Thunder Bay Generating Station	198 m	650 ft	1963	2021	Chimney	Power station	Canada	Thunder Bay, Ontario	Demolished on 9 September 2021.	Video on YouTube

== Timeline of tallest demolished freestanding structures ==
Name	Height (metres / feet)		Held record	Structural type	Country	Location	Notes
Meidum pyramid	92 m	300 ft	2610 BC–1303 AD (3,913 years)	Mausoleum	Egypt	Meidum	Collapsed during construction, now 65 m (213 ft).
Lighthouse of Alexandria	103 to 118 m	338 to 387 ft	1303–1500 (197 years)	Lighthouse	Egypt	Alexandria	Damaged by earthquakes in 956, 1303 and 1323. The most destructive of which is indicated to be the 1303 quake.
Malmesbury Abbey	131 m	431 ft	1500–1549 (49 years)	Church	United Kingdom	Malmesbury	Spire collapsed around 1500.
Lincoln Cathedral	159.7 m	524 ft	1549–1921 (372 years)	Church	United Kingdom	Lincoln	Spire collapsed in 1549.
New Brighton Tower	172.8 m	567 ft	1921–1936 (15 years)	Lattice tower	United Kingdom	Liverpool	Dismantled from 1919 to 1921.
US Naval Radio Station Pearl Harbor, 3 identical towers	183 m	600 ft	1936–1938 (2 years)	Lattice tower	United States	Honolulu	Dismantled in 1936.
US Naval Radio Station Cayey, 3 identical towers	189 m	620 ft	1938–1944 (6 years)	Lattice tower	United States	Cayey, Puerto Rico	Demolished in 1938.
Lafayette transmitter, 8 identical towers	250 m	820 ft	1944–1982 (38 years)	Lattice tower	France	Marcheprime	Towers 1 through to 7 demolished in 1944; tower 8 demolished in 1953.
Chimney #3 Matla Power Station Smokestack	276 m	906 ft	1982–1995 (13 years)	Chimney	South Africa	Kriel	Demolished in 1982 after partially collapsing during construction.
Chimney of Marl-Chemiepark Power Station	300 m	984 ft	1995–2001 (6 years)	Chimney	Germany	Marl	Demolished in 1995.
2 World Trade Center	415.3 m	1,362 ft	2001 (29 minutes)	Skyscraper	United States	New York City	Destroyed during the September 11 attacks at 9:59 am.
1 World Trade Center	417 m	1,368 ft	2001–present (25+ years)	Skyscraper	United States	New York City	Destroyed during the September 11 attacks at 10:28 am. Tallest freestanding structure that no longer exists.

== See also ==
- List of tallest structures by country
- List of tallest towers
- List of tallest chimneys
- List of tallest buildings and structures
- Lattice tower
