= Widows Creek Fossil Plant =

Decommissioned coal-fired power plant in Jackson County, Alabama, United States

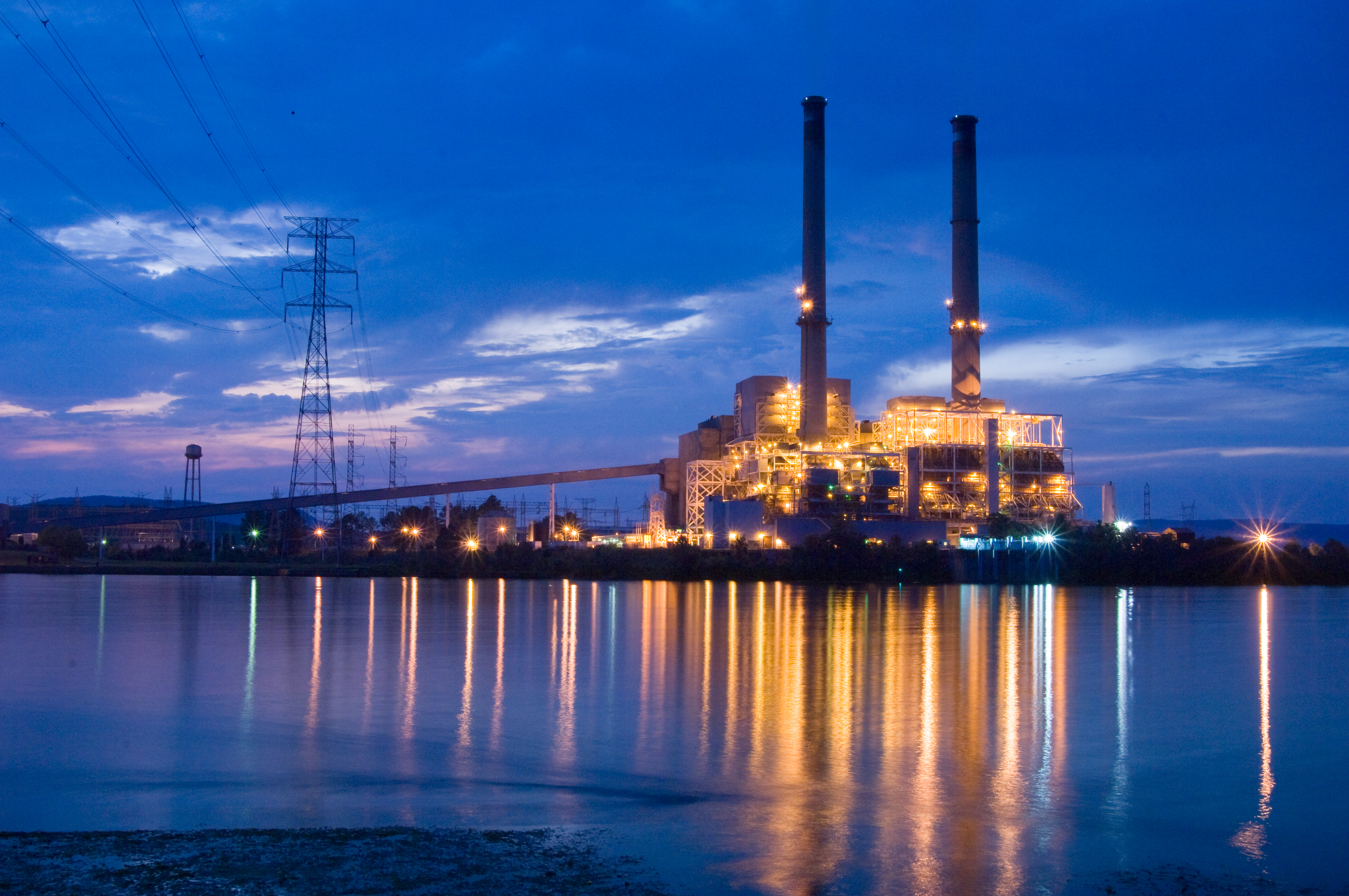
- Widows Creek Fossil Plant
- Country: United States
- Location: Jackson County, near Stevenson, Alabama
- Coordinates: 34°53′03″N 85°45′18″W
- Status: Being decommissioned
- Commission date: Unit 1: July, 1952; Unit 2: October, 1952; Unit 3: November, 1952; Unit 4: January, 1953; Unit 5: June, 1954; Unit 6: July, 1954; Unit 7: February, 1961; Unit 8: February, 1965
- Decommission date: Unit 7: September, 2015
- Owner: Tennessee Valley Authority

Thermal power station
- Primary fuel: Bituminous coal
- Cooling source: Tennessee River

Power generation
- Units decommissioned: 8
- Nameplate capacity: 1,600 MW
- Annual net output: 9,000 GWh

External links
- Commons: Related media on Commons

Widows Creek Fossil Plant (also known as the Widows Creek Power Plant) was a 1.6-gigawatt (1,600 MW) coal power plant, 4.8 miles (7.7 km) east of Stevenson, Alabama, United States. The plant, operated by the Tennessee Valley Authority, generated about nine billion kilowatt-hours of electricity a year. It had one of the tallest chimneys in the world at 305 metres (1,001 ft), which was built in 1977 and was removed December 3, 2020, in a controlled demolition. Along with the Chimney of the Harllee Branch Power Plant, it is the tallest chimney to be demolished in the United States.

== History ==
Initially, six identical 140-MWe units were built between 1952 and 1954. Two more units (575 and 550 MWe name-plate capacity) were added in 1961 and 1965.

The last load of coal was delivered to the plant on September 18, 2015, with only one of its eight generation units working. The coal was enough to power Unit 7 until September 23, 2015.

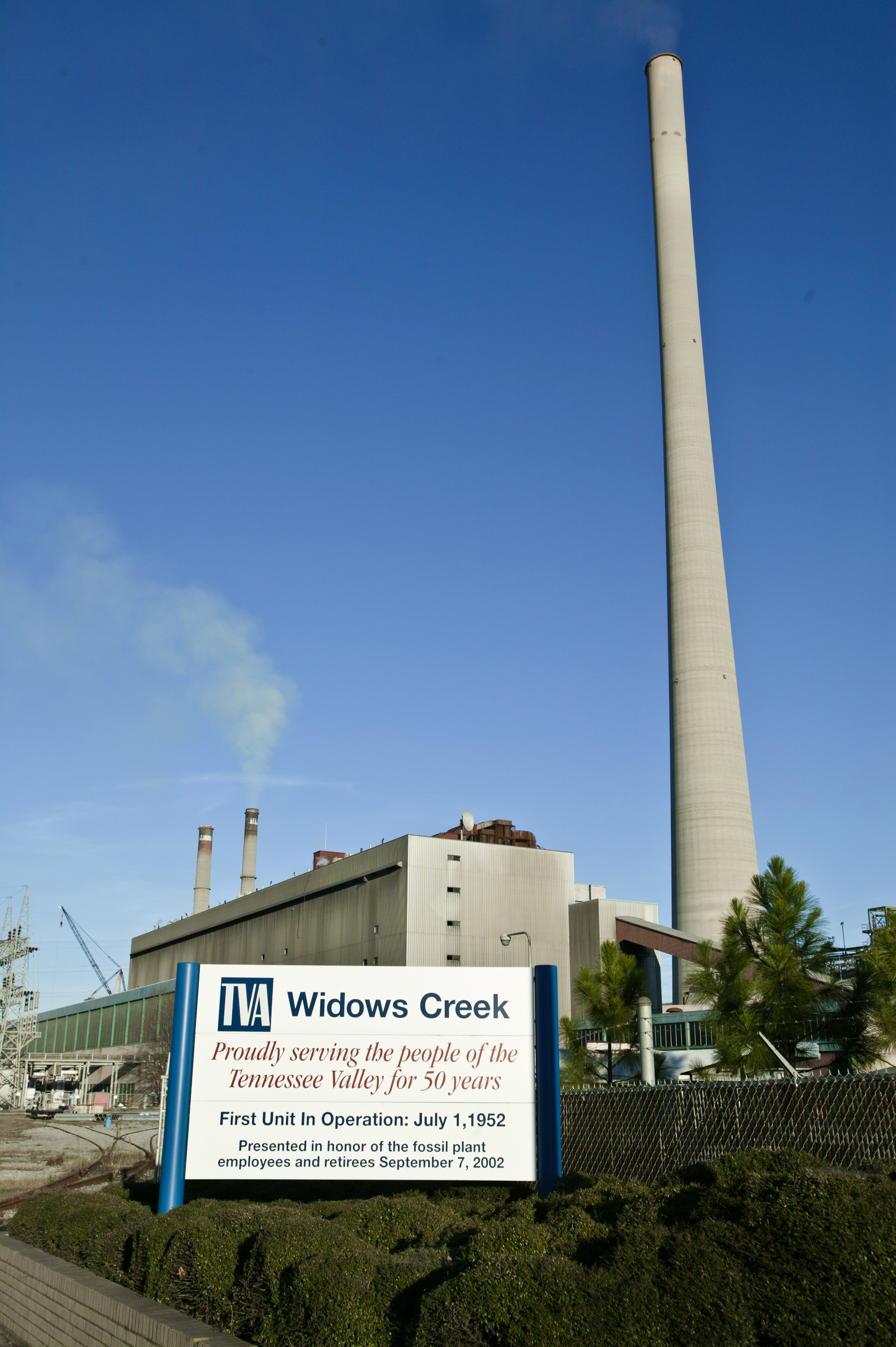
Widows Creek's one-thousand and one foot-tall stack

== Accidents and incidents ==
On January 9, 2009, the plant experienced a dam break on a gypsum slurry pond, and spilled up to 10,000 US gallons (38 m^{3}) of waste (possibly including boron, cadmium, molybdenum and selenium) into the creek of the same name on the property, inundating it with an ashlike substance.

== EPA compliance agreement ==
On April 14, 2011, the U.S. Environmental Protection Agency (EPA) announced a settlement with the Tennessee Valley Authority to resolve alleged Clean Air Act violations at 11 of its coal-fired plants in Alabama, Kentucky, and Tennessee. Under the terms of the agreement, the entire Widows Creek plant was affected:

- Units 1–6 were retired in stages of two units per year, beginning by July 31, 2013 and ending by July 31, 2015
- Units 7 & 8 were to be fitted with selective catalytic reduction (SCR) devices to reduce their emissions of nitrogen oxide (NO_{x})
- In December, 2020, the towering smokestack at the Widows Creek Fossil Plant, standing at a height of 1,001 feet, was brought down in a controlled demolition using explosives. This operation, completed in a mere 90 seconds, effectively removed the largest remaining structure at the 8-unit coal-fired power plant situated along the Tennessee River.

== Future ==
On June 24, 2015, Google, a multinational technology company, announced it would invest $600 million to install a data center on land made available by the retirement of Units 1-6. A renewable power capacity equivalent to the data center's needs will be added somewhere on the TVA system, so the data center will run on renewable energy. The project broke ground in April 2018. In 2026, Google announced a $1.5 billion investment to expand its data center campus over the 2026–2027 period.

== See also ==
- List of tallest chimneys
- List of tallest freestanding structures
- List of tallest demolished freestanding structures
