= Teruel Power Plant =

Power plant in Aragon, Spain

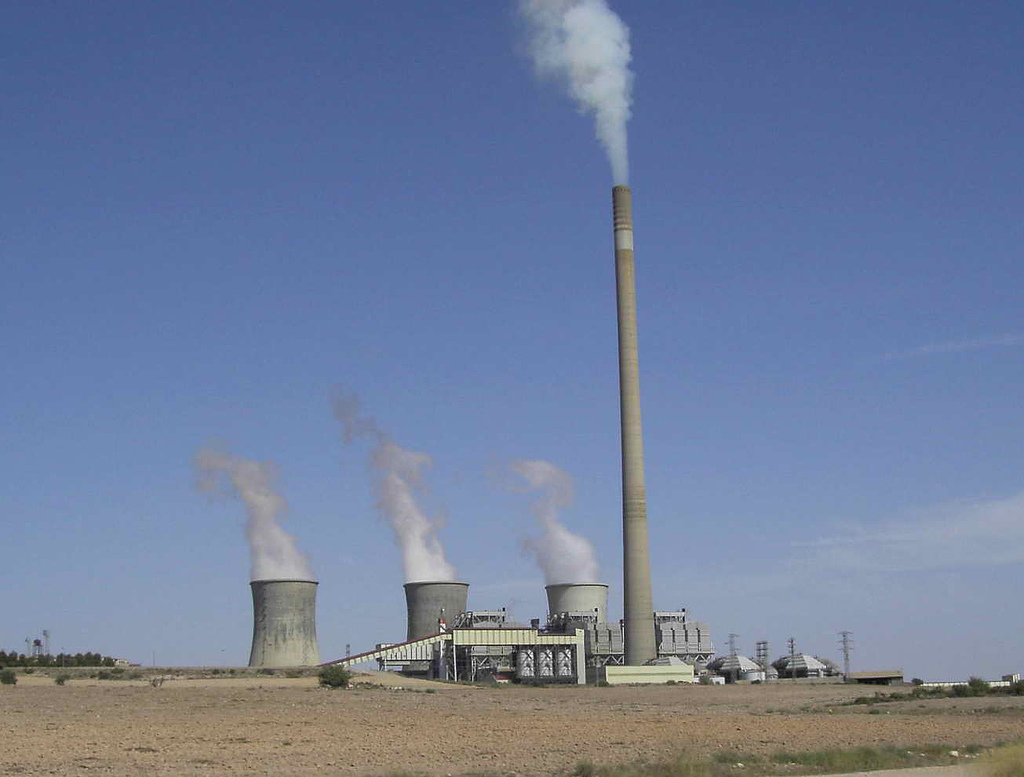
- Official name: Central térmica de Andorra
- Country: Spain
- Location: Andorra, Teruel
- Coordinates: 40°59′50.84″N 0°22′52.23″W
- Status: Decommissioned
- Commission date: 1981
- Decommission date: 30 June 2020
- Owner: Endesa
- Operator: Endesa

Thermal power station
- Primary fuel: Lignite

Power generation
- Units decommissioned: 3 x 350 MW
- Nameplate capacity: 1,050 MW (1981-2020)

External links
- Commons: Related media on Commons

Teruel Power Plant was a lignite fired power plant near the town of Andorra in the province of Teruel, community of Aragon, Spain. The flue gas stack of Teruel Power Plant was 343 metres (1,125 ft) high. Teruel Power Plant had three generating units with a capacity of 350 megawatts each. In 1992, Teruel Power Plant was equipped with filters that reduced the amount of detrimental sulfur dioxide emitted in the smoke by 90%.

The plant was closed in 2020. On February 16, 2023, the chimney was demolished by explosives. Until it was surpassed in 2025 by the demolition of Homer City Generating Station, the Teruel Power Plant chimney was the tallest freestanding structure ever demolished in a controlled manner.

== See also ==
- List of towers
- List of chimneys
- List of tallest freestanding structures in the world
- List of tallest demolished freestanding structures
