= Schilling Power Station =

Former petroleum power station in Stade, Germany

Coordinates: 53°37′01″N 9°32′02″E

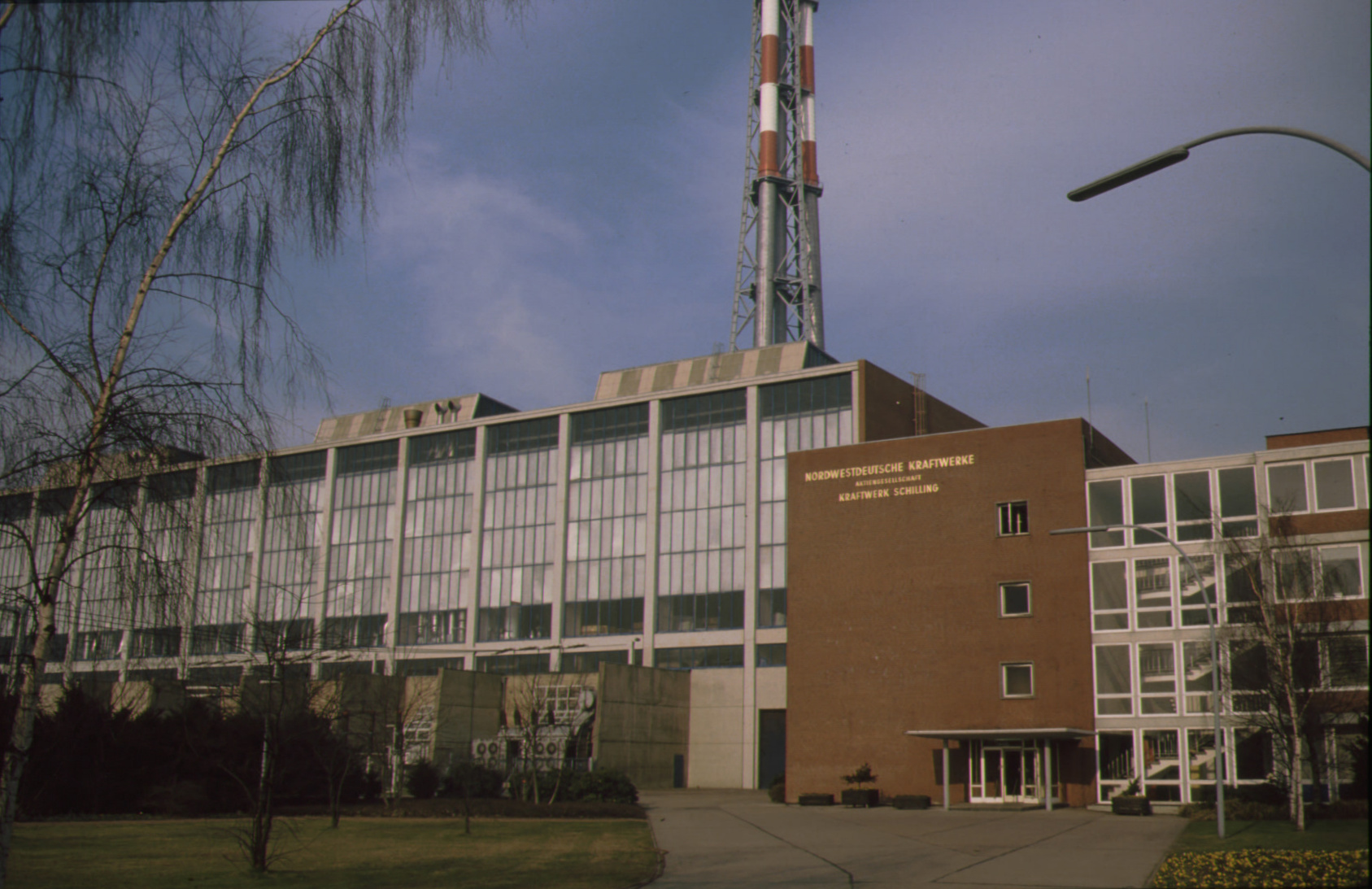

Schilling Power Station was an oil-fired power station in the proximity of the nuclear power station at Stade. It went into operation in 1960, was extended in 1962 and 1964, and was shut down in the 1980s. Since it principally served Hamburg north for the electricity supply of Hamburg and fed its current into the transformer station, the first overhead line crossing of the Elbe was built at that time at Stade, the Elbe Crossing 1. The buildings still exist today and are occasionally used for disaster control exercises.

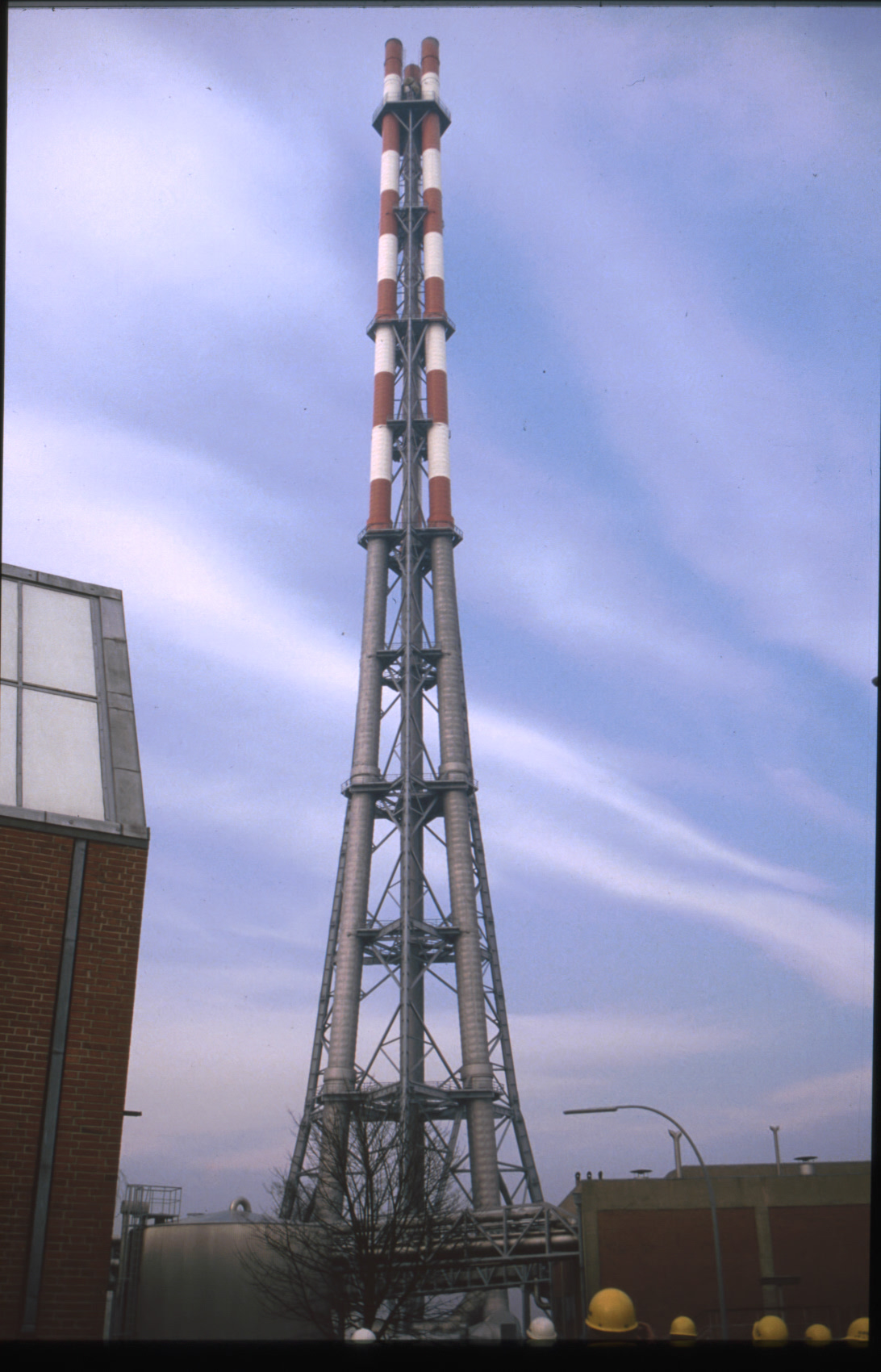
The smokestack

Due to the use of heavy fuel oil, a chimney was built with a height of 722 feet or 220 metres, it was 1962-1965 the tallest chimney worldwide. It was an open lattice structure with three separate exhaust pipes from the blocks. The structure was demolished in 2005.

== See also ==
- List of tallest demolished freestanding structures
- List of tallest chimneys
- Lattice tower

Records
Preceded by INCO Copper Cliff Nickel Refinery Stack, Greater Sudbury	World's tallest chimney 220 m (722 ft); 1962–1965	Succeeded by Chimney of ASARCO
