= Auesee =

Lake in Wesel, North Rhine-Westphalia, Germany

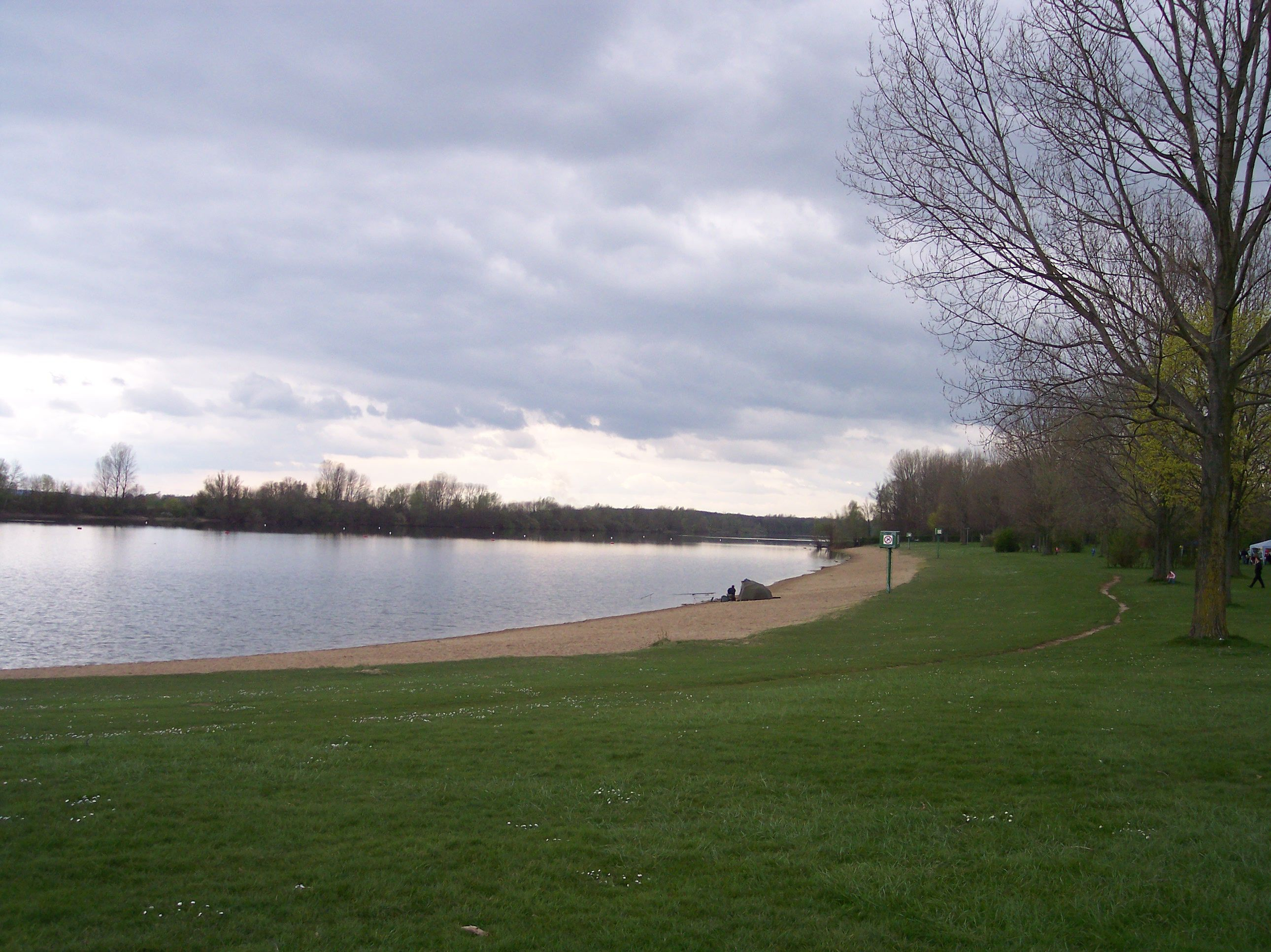
- Auesee

- Location within North Rhine-Westphalia
- Location: North Rhine-Westphalia
- Coordinates: 51.6732°N 6.5813°E
- Basin countries: Germany
- Surface area: 1.55 km^{2} (0.60 sq mi)
- Max. depth: 17.49 m (57.4 ft)

Auesee is an artificial bathing lake in Wesel, North Rhine-Westphalia, Germany, about 50 kilometres (31 mi) northwest from the state capital of Düsseldorf. A popular recreation spot, it has been referred to as the "jewel" of Wesel. Auesee was built from one of the largest gravel excavation sites in North Rhine-Westphalia.

== Terrain ==
The lake has a surface area of 1.55 km^{2} (0.60 sq mi). Within the lake there are distinct areas of shallow water with depths up to 6 m (20 ft), while its deepest point is 17.5 m (57 ft). The main lake basin is stable, and the banks are fixed. A peninsula stretching into the lake from the southeast divides the waters into a north-east and a south-west basin, both of which are connected to the north basin. As an artificial lake, Auesee has no inflow or outflow, and is fed exclusively by groundwater.

== History ==
The formation of Auesee was initiated as a partnership between the municipality of Wesel and the excavating company Hülskens & Co. Negotiations began in 1959, and resulted in an agreement that the company would remove gravel from the site to use in their gravel pit, and the city would fill in the resulting pit to form a bathing lake. The project broke ground in May 1963 and excavation continued until 1993.

The beach was first opened on a provisional basis in 1970, and proved to be an immediate success. Construction on the jetty and slipway for recreational boating began in 1971, and these areas were opened to the public in 1980.

== Flora and fauna ==
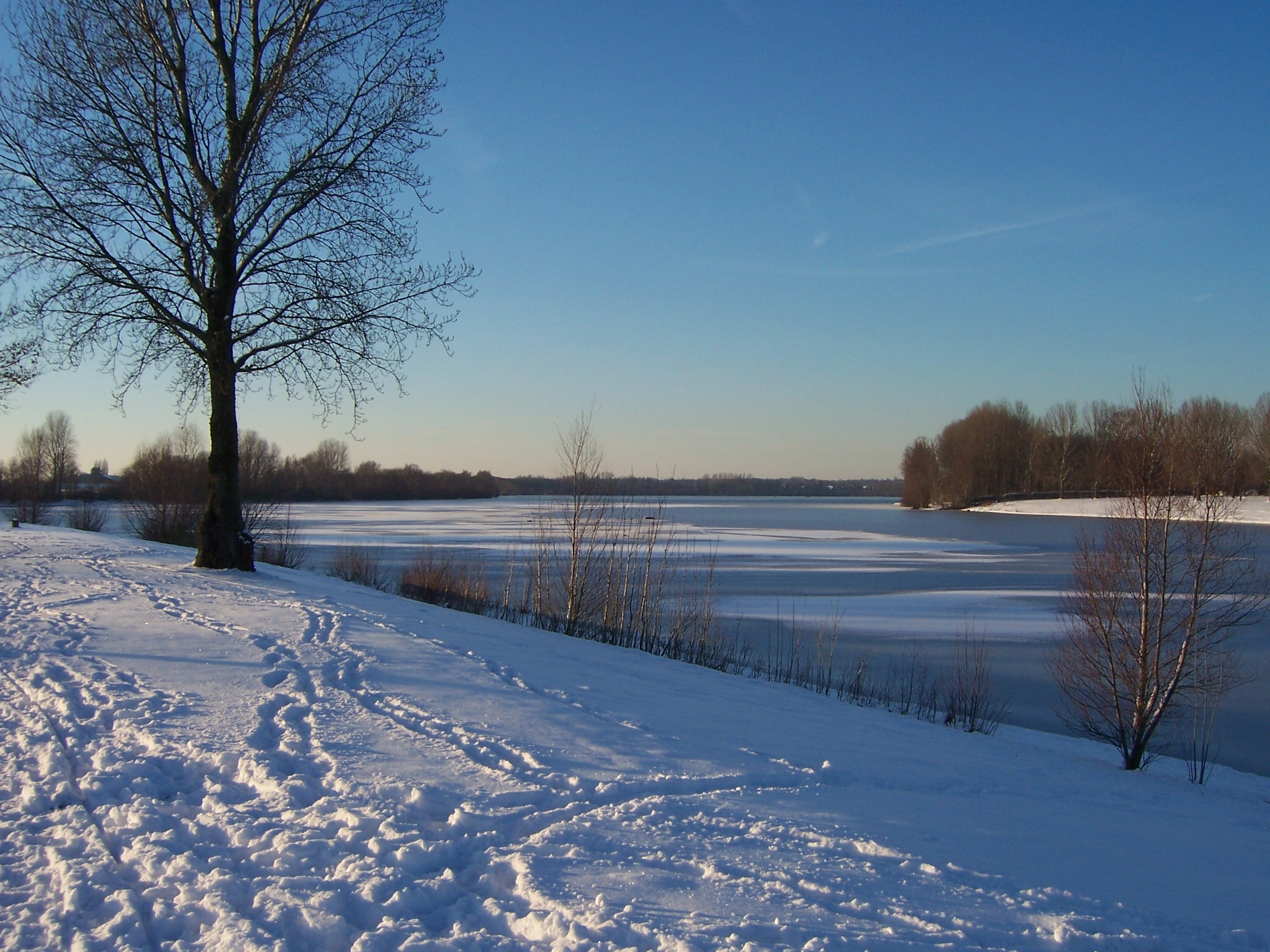
Auesee in the wintertime

Although it is an artificial lake, Auesee is well-integrated into its natural surroundings, providing a habitat for local plants and animals. The shores of Auesee are partially lined with a dense stand of riparian woodland. In some areas there are sparse beds of reeds. The underwater vegetation is richly developed. The shoreline is densely populated up to depths of 10 m (33 ft) with starry stonewort, or Nitellopsis obtusa. In the shallower areas, major species include Myriophyllum spicatum, Elodea nuttallii, Potamogeton lucens, and Potamogeton perfoliatus, as well as numerous other species of pondweed.

There is very little phytoplankton in Auesee. Only diatoms and cryptophyceae occur regularly. Rhodomonas minuta, Gymnodinium helveticum, and some species of genus Cyclotella occur temporarily in larger numbers.

The lake has been stocked with various types of fish, which have established breeding populations. Among those found in the lake are carp, pike, pike-perch, perch, tench, eels, and white fish like common roach and bream.

Many waterfowl have taken up residence on the lake and the peninsula. Most commonly found are Eurasian coots, Mallard ducks, herons, pochards, and mute swans. A protected island for bird nesting, as well as floating nesting grounds within the lake, have been provided to encourage these species to settle at the lake.

== Recreation ==
Auesee is a popular lake for recreation, with many different possible activities both in and out of the water. As a bathing lake, Auesee has a large sandy beach for swimming, sunbathing, and beach volleyball. The DLRG operates a lifeguard station on weekends and holidays. Auesee is also popular with divers, and in 2000, a yacht called The Poiseidon was sunk into the lake for divers to explore. The lake water is tested once a month during swimming season in accordance with the 2006 European Union Bathing Waters Directive, and may be closed down temporarily if harmful bacteria are found.

The lake sports a slipway and a jetty for small pleasure craft. There are also lighted paths around the lake for walking, running, and cycling.
