= Wesel =

- Town
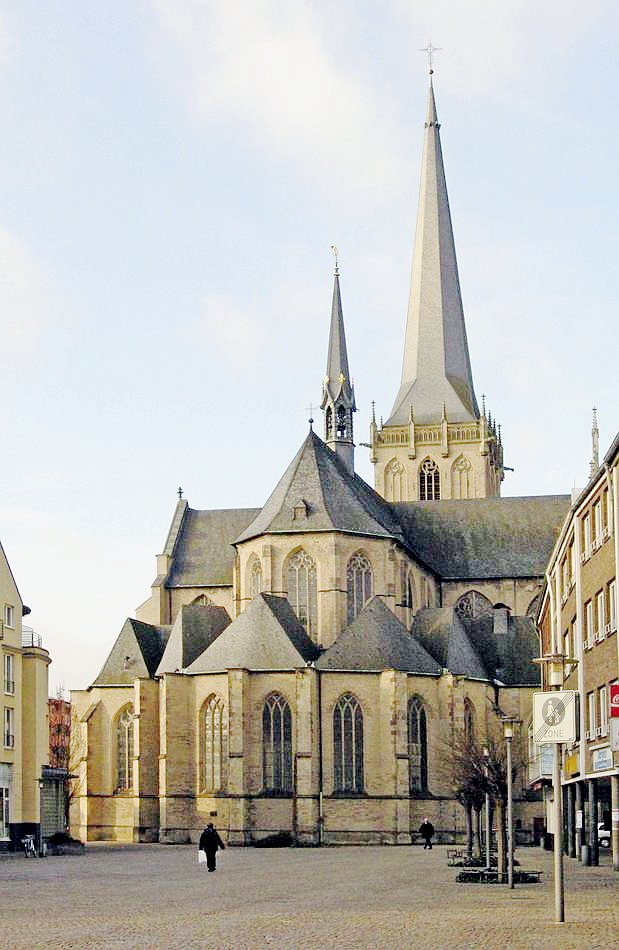
- Willibrordi-Dom in Wesel. The cathedral, dedicated to St Willibrord, has been restored after wartime bombing.

- Flag Coat of arms

- Location of Wesel within Wesel district
- Interactive map of Wesel
- Location within Germany Location within North Rhine-Westphalia
- Coordinates: 51°39′31″N 6°37′4″E
- Country: Germany
- State: North Rhine-Westphalia
- Admin. region: Düsseldorf
- District: Wesel
- Subdivisions: 5

Government
  - Mayor (2020–25): Rainer Benien (SPD)

Area
  - Total: 122.56 km^{2} (47.32 sq mi)
- Elevation: 23 m (75 ft)

Population (2025-12-31)
  - Total: 60,717
  - Density: 495.41/km^{2} (1,283.1/sq mi)
- Time zone: UTC+01:00 (CET)
  - Summer (DST): UTC+02:00 (CEST)
- Postal codes: 46483, 46485, 46487
- Dialling codes: 02 81; 0 28 03 (Büderich); 0 28 59 (Bislich)
- Vehicle registration: WES, DIN, MO
- Website: www.wesel.de

Wesel (German pronunciation: [ˈveːzl̩]) is a city in North Rhine-Westphalia, in western Germany. It is the capital of the Wesel district.

== Geography ==
Wesel is situated at the confluence of the Lippe River and the Rhine.

=== Division of the city ===
Suburbs of Wesel include Lackhausen, Obrighoven, Ginderich, Feldmark, Fusternberg, Büderich, Flüren and Blumenkamp.

== History ==
=== Origin ===
The city originated from a Franconian manor that was first recorded in the 8th century. In the 12th century, the Duke of Clèves took possession of Wesel. The city became a member of the Hanseatic League during the 15th century. Wesel was second only to Cologne in the lower Rhine region as an entrepôt. It was an important commercial centre: a clearing station for the transshipment and trading of goods.

=== Early modern ===
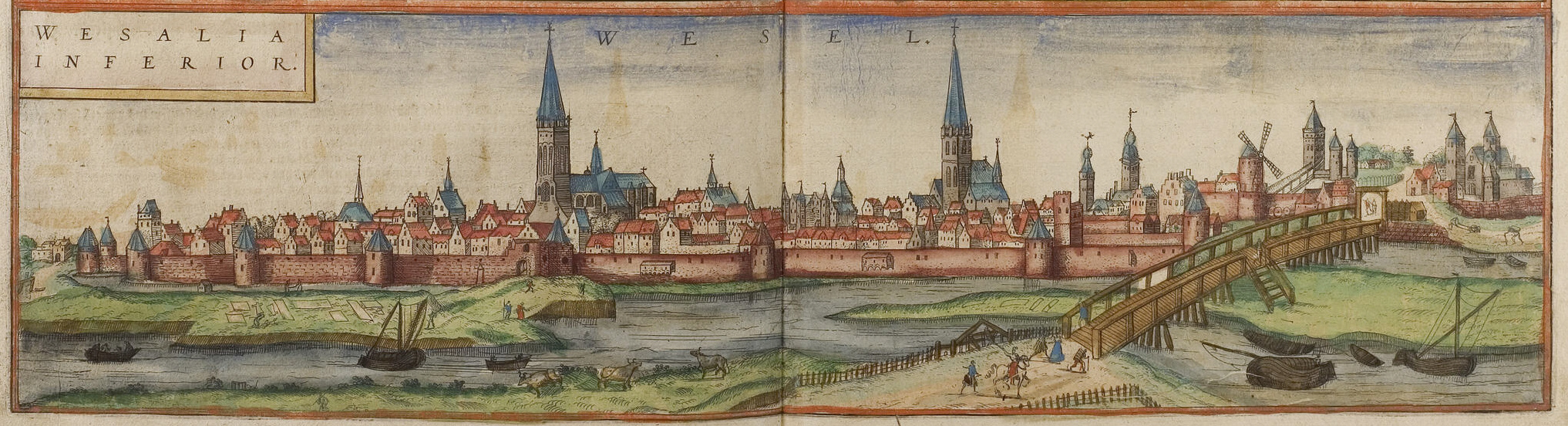
Wesel in the 16th century

In 1545, a Walloon community in Wesel was noted, with French-language church services.

In 1590, the Spanish captured Wesel after a four-year siege. The city changed hands between the Dutch and Spanish several times during the Eighty Years War. In 1672, a French force under Louis II de Bourbon, Prince de Condé captured the city.

Wesel was inherited by the Hohenzollerns of the Margraviate of Brandenburg in 1609 but they were unable to take control of Wesel until the Treaty of Nijmegen in 1678. In 1688, a French Huguenot commune was founded in the town. Although the city had been heavily fortified the Prussians evacuated the city during the Seven Years' War and it was occupied by the French. It was returned to Prussia at the end of the war. Friedrich Wilhelm von Dossow was the Prussian Governor of Wesel during the 18th century.

In 1805, during the Napoleonic Wars, Wesel was ceded to the French Empire under the Treaty of Schönbrunn. It became part of the Grand Duchy of Berg, established in March 1806 as a French client state under Joachim Murat, before being annexed to France-proper in January 1808. The French heavily fortified the city constructing a rectangular fort called the Citadelle Napoleon at Büderich and the Citadelle Bonaparte on an island in the Rhine off Wesel. Though blockaded by the Allies in 1813 the city remained in French hands until after the Battle of Waterloo. After the Napoleonic Wars the city became part of the Prussian Province of Jülich-Cleves-Berg in 1815 then the Rhine Province in 1822; the Citadelle Napoleon was renamed Fort Blücher.

=== World War II ===
Forced laborers of the 3rd SS construction brigade were dispatched in the town in 1943.

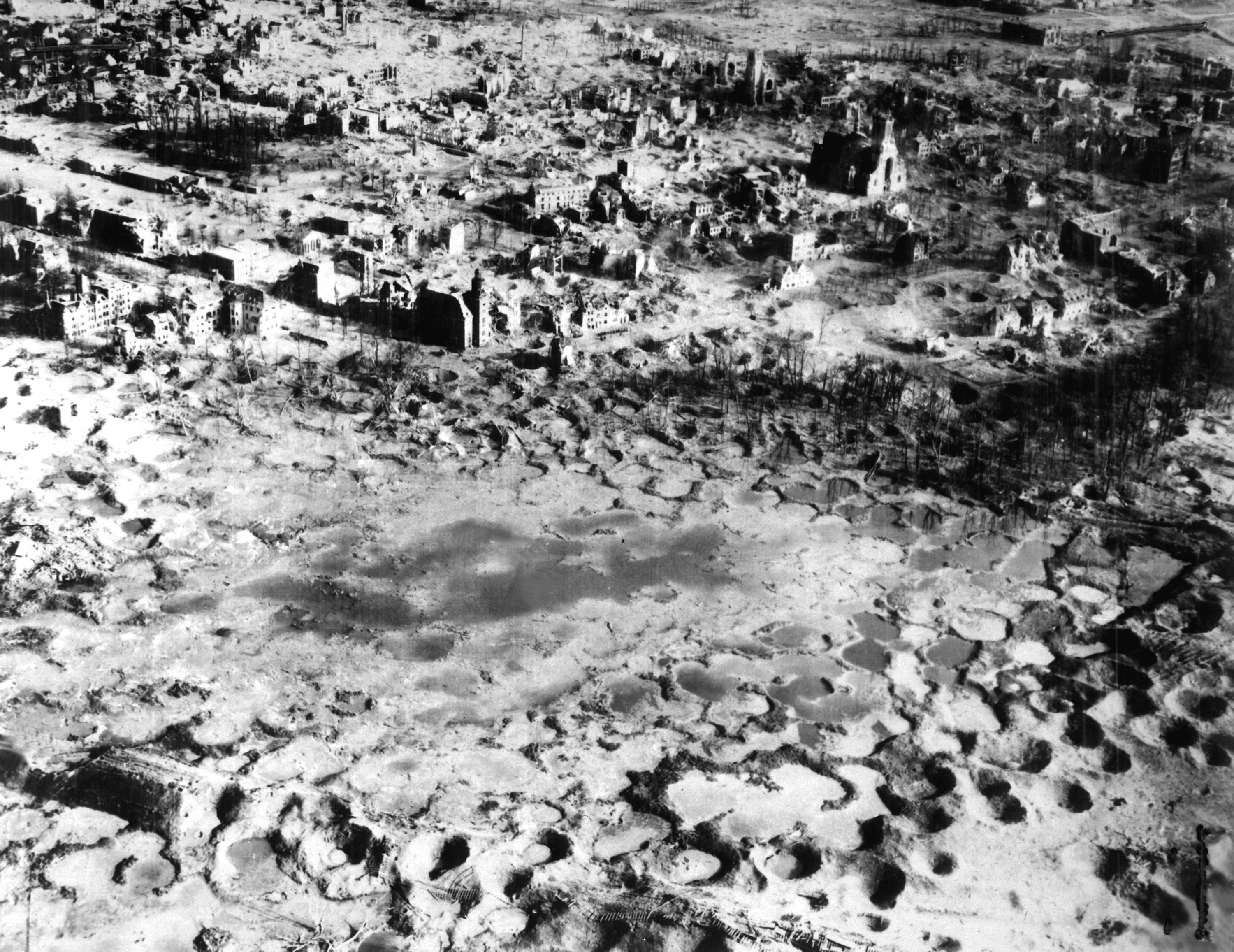
97% of Wesel was destroyed before it was finally taken by Allied troops in 1945.

During World War II, as a strategic depot, Wesel became a target of Allied bombing. Air raids, using impact and air-burst bombs, on 16, 17, 18 and 19 February 1945, destroyed 97% of the town. The Wehrmacht blew up bridges along the Rhine and Lippe to prevent Allied forces from advancing. The Wehrmacht also destroyed the 1,950m-long railway bridge, the last Rhine bridge remaining in German hands, on 10 March. On 23 March, Wesel came under the fire of over 3,000 guns when it was bombarded anew, in preparation for Operation Plunder. The shelling was assisted by a raid of RAF bombers and a larger raid that night, during which ten individual bombers each dropped a 10,000 kg bomb on Wesel at 2100 hours. Before the town was finally taken by Allied troops, 97% of its structures were destroyed. In the ensuing attacks by Allied forces, the town was taken with minimal casualties. Operation Varsity – the largest airborne landings of the war in one day and one location – dropped 18,000 troops into the area to take the hills behind Wesel. The British 1st Commando Brigade was already attacking Wesel, carried into action by LVT Buffalos. The remainder of the Allied force crossed the Rhine in more amphibious vehicles.

From almost 25,000 in 1939, the population was reduced to 1,900 by May 1945. In 1946, Wesel became part of the new state North Rhine-Westphalia of West Germany.

== Population ==
Historical population

Year	Pop.	±% p.a.
1965	50,283	—
1970	54,773	+1.73%
1975	56,589	+0.65%
1980	56,777	+0.07%
1985	54,793	−0.71%
1990	59,631	+1.71%
1995	61,609	+0.65%

Year	Pop.	±% p.a.
2000	62,063	+0.15%
2005	61,711	−0.11%
2010	60,750	−0.31%
2015	60,595	−0.05%
2020	60,329	−0.09%
2025	60,717	+0.13%

Source: Landesdatabank Nordrhein-Westfalen

== Transport ==
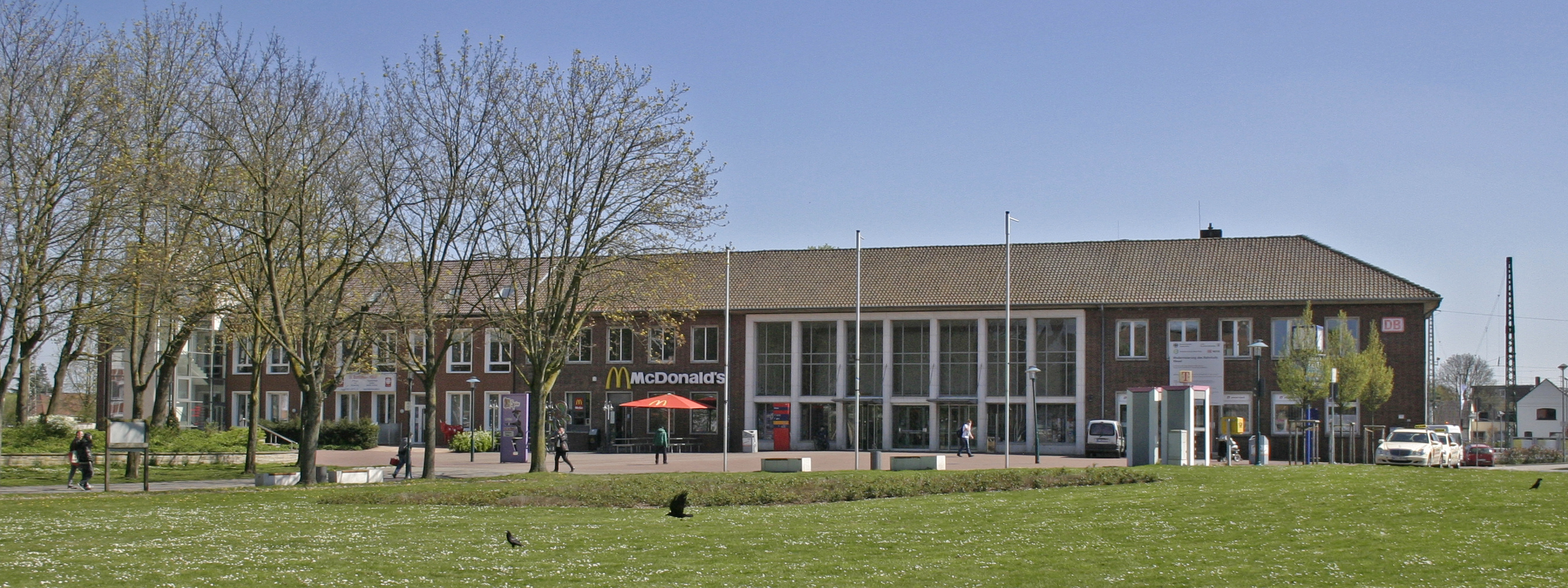
Main railway station

There is a railway station in the city centre as well as Wesel-Feldmark, about 2 km north. The stations are served by trains to Oberhausen, Duisburg, Düsseldorf, Cologne, Arnhem (Netherlands), and Mönchengladbach. A small diesel-only connecting railway line goes to Bocholt also, there are plans to electrify it.

There is no airport in the city with the nearest airports are:

- Weeze Airport, located 41 km (25 mi) to the west.
- Düsseldorf Airport, located 64 km (40 mi) south.
- Dortmund Airport, located 90 km (56 mi) to the south east.
- Münster Osnabrück Airport, located 104 km (65 mi) to the north east.

== Buildings and places of interest ==
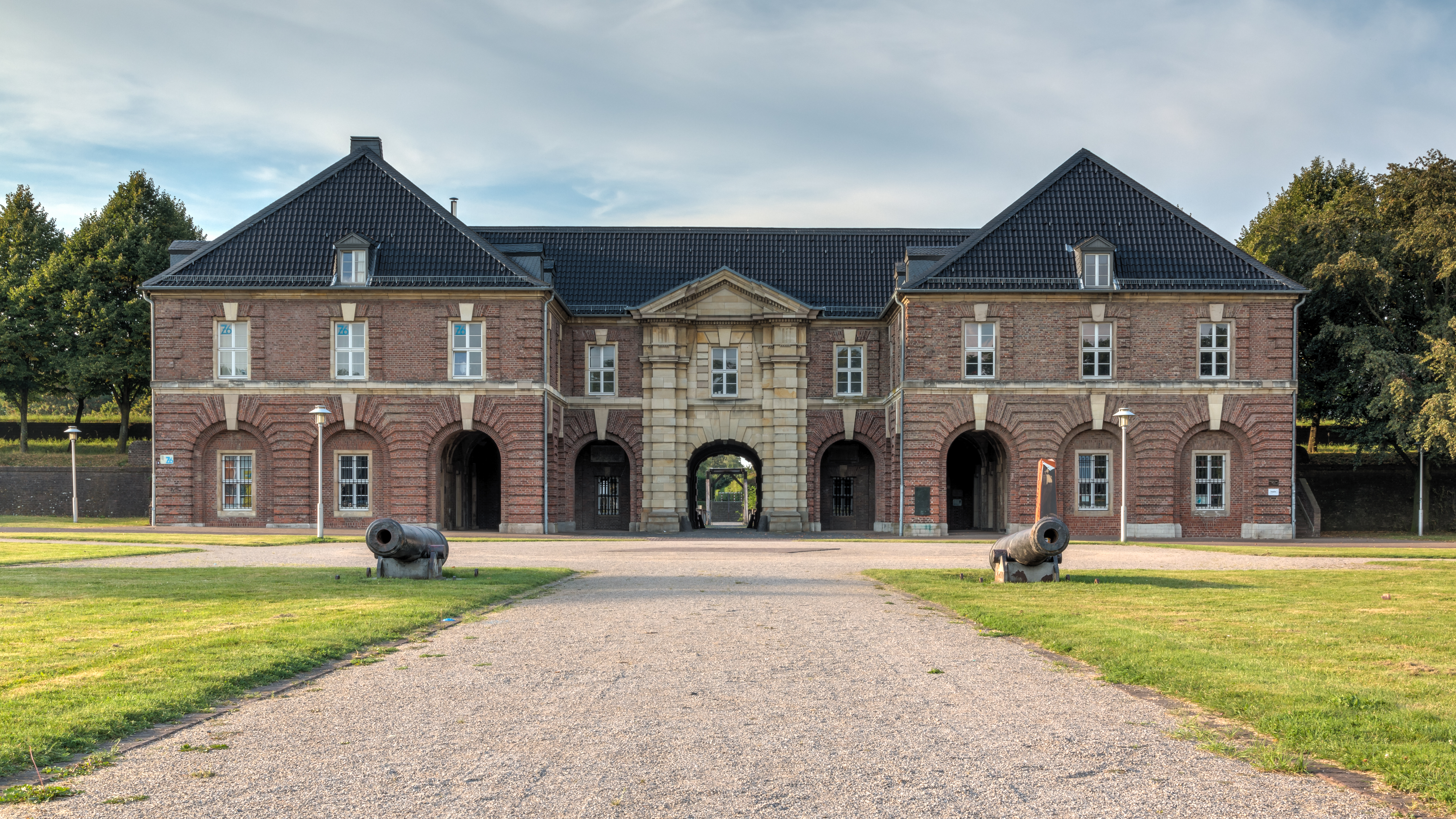
Wesel Citadel

- Berliner Tor, city gate
- Willibrordi-Dom (Cathedral). Commemorative plaque for Peter Minuit, Gründer von New York (founder of New York)
- Wesel Citadel
- Restored 15th century city hall
- Broadcasting Mast Wesel, one of Germany's tallest constructions
- Niederrheinbrücke Wesel, modern Rhine bridge opened in 2009
- Auesee, an natural bathing lake, an old arm of the Rhine river

== Politics ==
Wesel's mayors:

- 1808–1814: Johann Hermann Westermann
- 1814–1840: Christian Adolphi
- 1841–1862: Franz Luck
- 1863–1870: Wilhelm Otto van Calker
- 1870–1873: Heinrich Bang
- 1873–1881: Carl Friedrich August von Albert
- 1881–1891: Caspar Baur
- 1891–1902: Josef Fluthgraf (1896 Oberbürgermeister)
- 1903–1931: Ludwig Poppelbaum
- 1931–1933: Emil Nohl
- 1933–1945: Otto Borgers
- 1945: Jean Groos
- 1945: Wilhelm Groos
- 1946–1947: Anton Ebert (CDU)
- 1947–1948: Paul Körner (CDU)
- 1948–1952: Ewald Fournell (CDU)
- 1952–1956: Helmut Berckel (CDU)
- 1956–1966: Kurt Kräcker (SPD)
- 1967–1969: Willi Nakaten (SPD)
- 1969–1979: Günther Detert (CDU)
- 1979–1984: Wilhelm Schneider (SPD)
- 1984–1989: Volker Haubitz (CDU)
- 1989–1994: Wilhelm Schneider (SPD)
- 1994–1999: Bernhard Gründken (SPD)
- 1999–2004: Jörn Schroh (CDU)
- 2004–2025: Ulrike Westkamp (SPD)
- since 2025: Rainer Benien (SPD)

== Twin towns – sister cities ==
Wesel is twinned with:

- Hagerstown, United States (1952)
- Felixstowe, England (1972)
- Salzwedel, Germany (1990)
- Kętrzyn, Poland (2002)

== Notable people ==
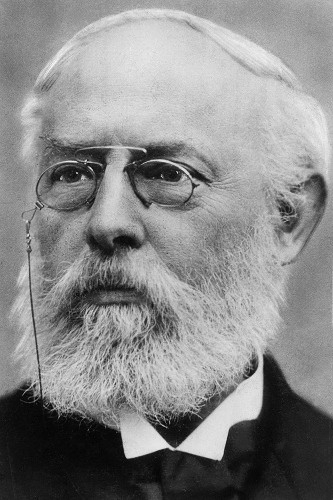
Konrad Duden, author of the first Duden

- Derick Baegert (1440–after 1509), painter
- Andreas Wytinck van Wesel, or Andreas Vesalius, anatomist, imperial physician to the court of Emperor Charles V
- Jan Joest (1455–1519), painter
- Hermann Wesel († 1563), last Bishop of Dorpat
- Hans Lippershey (1550–1619), eyeglass maker associated with the invention of the telescope
- Peregrine Bertie, 13th Baron Willoughby de Eresby (1555–1601), English diplomat and soldier
- Carl Philipp, Reichsgraf von Wylich und Lottum (1650–1719), Prussian field marshal
- Peter Minuit (1594–1638), founder of New Amsterdam, which later became New York City
- Johann Friedrich Welsch (1796–1871), painter
- Konrad Duden (1829–1911), author of the first Duden
- Ludwig Hugo Becker (1833–1868), painter
- Friedrich Geselschap (1835–1898), painter
- Richard Veenfliet (1843–1922), painter and soldier
- Ida Tacke (1896–1978), co-discoverer of the chemical elements rhenium and technetium
- Joachim von Ribbentrop (1893–1946), foreign minister of Nazi Germany (1938–1945)
- Jan Hofer (born 1950), journalist and television presenter
- Dieter Nuhr (born 1960), comedian
- Martin Bambauer (born 1970), church musician

== Miscellaneous ==
One of Germany's highest radio masts is situated in the district of Büderich on the left bank of the Rhine. The Wesel transmitter measures 320.8 metres in height.

== See also ==
- Wesel Railway Bridge

== Books ==
- Jutta Prieur (Hrsg.): Geschichte der Stadt Wesel: Beiträge zur Stadtgeschichte der frühen Neuzeit (= Studien und Quellen zur Geschichte von Wesel 20). Stadtarchiv, Wesel 1998, ISBN 3-924380-15-5
- Daniel Vasta (Hrsg.): Wesel – Hansestadt am Niederrhein: Beiträge zum zeitgenössischen Geschehen (= Bilder von Menschen, Land und Leuten, Wesel 2009). Sutton Verlag, Wesel 2009, ISBN 3-86680-568-3
- Martin W. Roelen (Hrsg.): Ecclesia Wesele: Beiträge zur Ortsnamenforschung und Kirchengeschichte (= Studien und Quellen zur Geschichte von Wesel 28). Stadtarchiv, Wesel 2005, ISBN 3-924380-23-6
