= Wesel transmitter =

Tower in Germany

Coordinates: 51°38′56″N 6°34′41″E

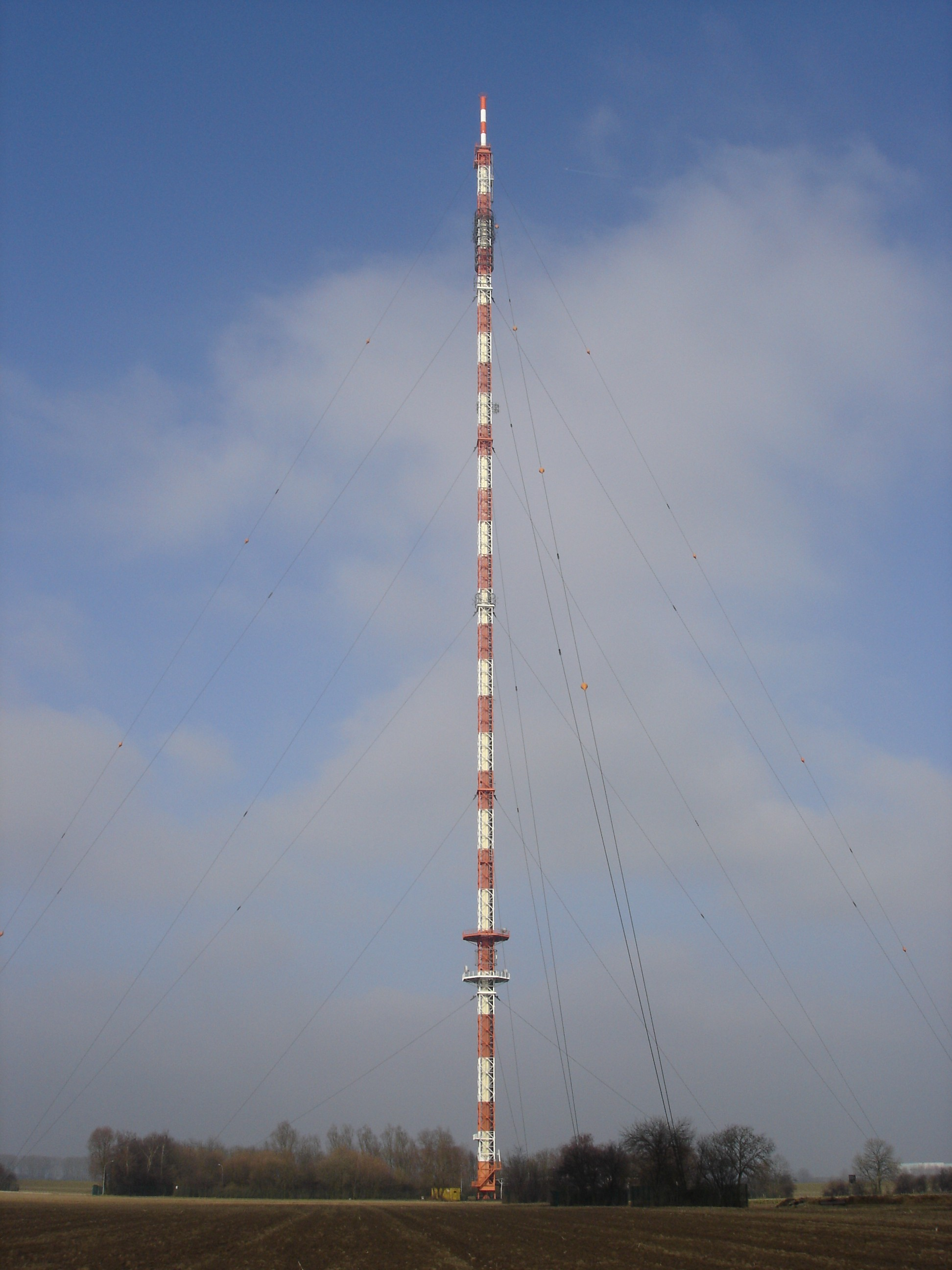
FM and TV-mast Wesel

The FM and TV-mast Wesel is a 320.8-metre-tall (1,052 ft) guyed steel framework radio mast of the Deutsche Telekom AG at Wesel-Büderich, North Rhine-Westphalia, Germany. FM and TV-mast Wesel was built in 1968 and is used for FM and TV transmission.

FM and TV-mast Wesel is the second tallest structure in the state of North Rhine-Westphalia. Before the construction of the chimney of Power Station Westerholt, it had been the tallest structure in North Rhine-Westphalia. When the chimney was demolished on November 12, 2006, FM and TV-mast Wesel reclaimed this title.

== See also ==
List of masts
