= Westerholt Power Station =

Coal power plant in Gelsenkirchen-Westerholt, Germany

Coordinates: 51°36′04″N 7°03′50″E

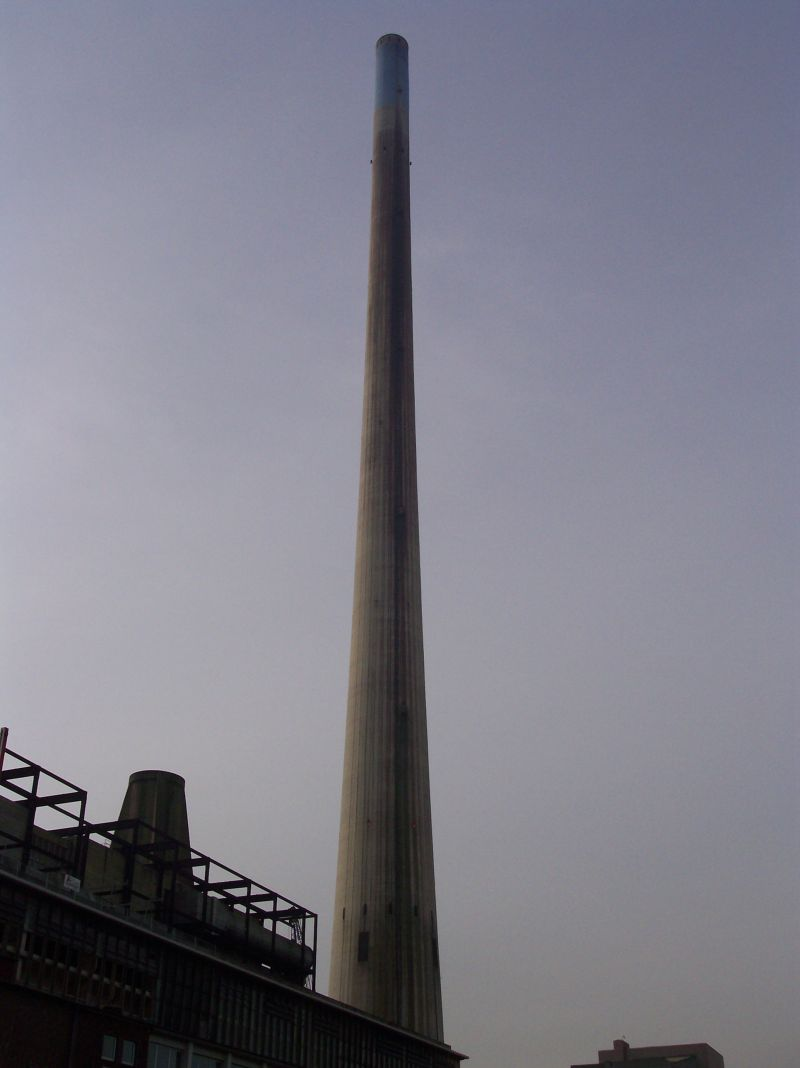
300 m (1000 ft) tall smokestack of Westerholt Power Station

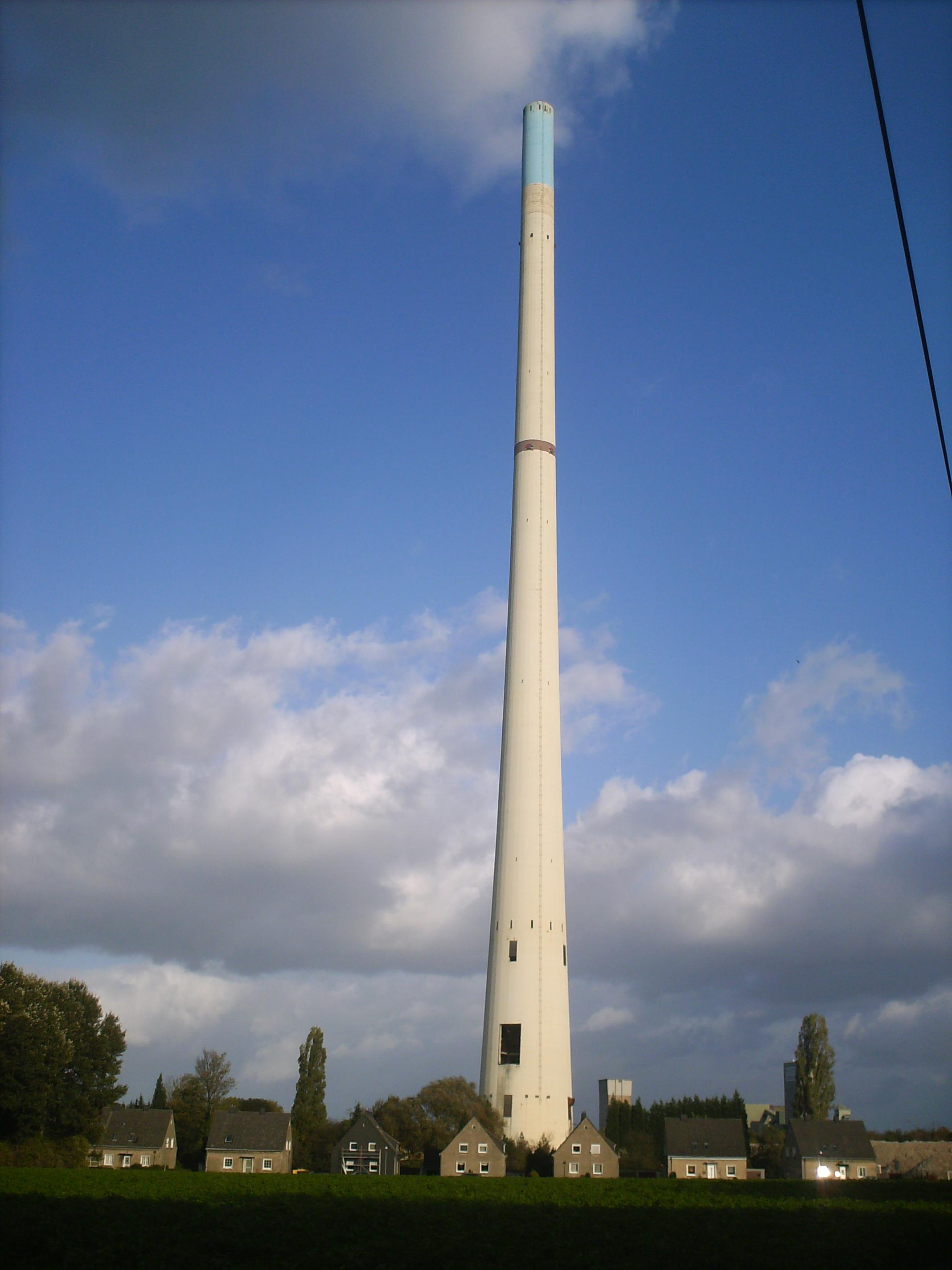
Chimney of Westerholt Power Station a few days before demolition

Westerholt Power Station was a coal fired power station in Gelsenkirchen-Westerholt, Germany. The power plant consisted of two units built in the 1960s, each capable of producing 150 MW of electricity. Its smokestack, built in 1981, was 300 metres (984 feet) tall,

The power station was decommissioned on May 13, 2005, and the chimney demolished on Sunday, December 3, 2006, at 10:53 a.m.

It was the tallest structure in North Rhine-Westphalia. Before its erection the 320.8 m tall Wesel transmitter tower took this claim. After the demolition of the chimney, the Wesel tower once again became the tallest structure in North Rhine-Westphalia.

A district heating plant, "FWK Westerholt", has been in operation on this site since the spring of 2004. There are six boilers there to provide heat for the district heating network of the northern Ruhr Area.

The Westerholt coal mine is located only a few hundred metres away. Both the power plant and the mine are on the city limits of Gelsenkirchen in the Hassel neighborhood and were named for the contiguous (and at that time still independent) city of Westerholt in what was then the district of Recklinghausen (today the city is a part of the city of Herten and is named "Herten-Westerholt").

== See also ==
- List of chimneys
- List of tallest demolished freestanding structures
- List of tallest freestanding structures in the world
