= Homer City Generating Station =

Decommissioned coal-fired power station in Pennsylvania, US

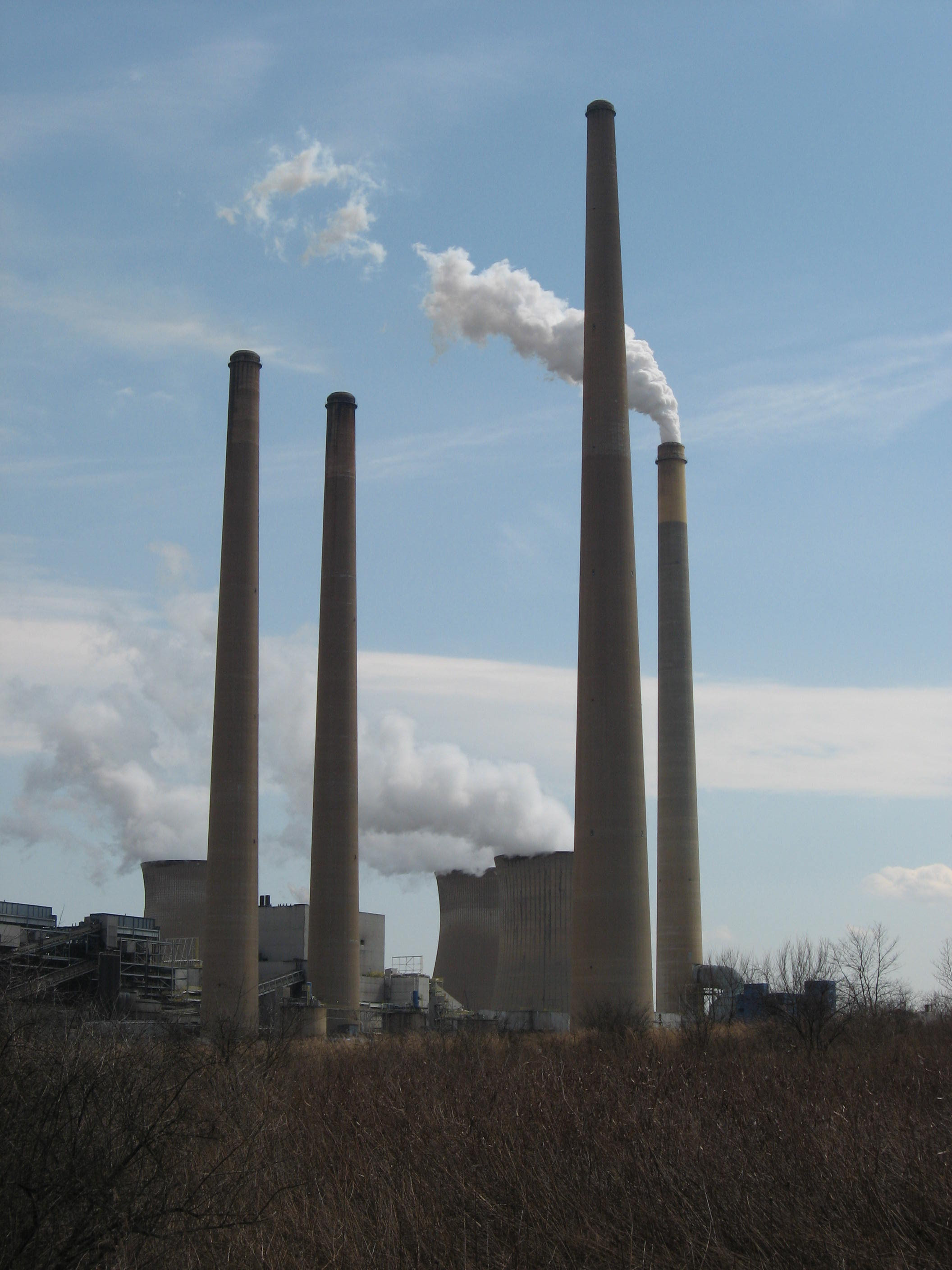
- Homer City Generation Station in March 2008
- Country: United States
- Location: Center Township, Pennsylvania, U.S.
- Coordinates: 40°30′39″N 79°11′37″W
- Status: Decommissioned
- Commission date: Units 1–2: 1969; Unit 3: 1977
- Decommission date: Units 1-3: July 1, 2023
- Owners: Hedge funds and private equity firms
- Operator: NRG Energy

Thermal power station
- Primary fuel: Bituminous coal
- Turbine technology: Steam turbine
- Cooling source: Two Lick Reservoir, Two Lick Creek, and Blacklick Creek

Power generation
- Nameplate capacity: 2022 MW

External links
- Commons: Related media on Commons

Homer City Generating Station is a decommissioned 2-GW coal-burning power station near Homer City, in Indiana County, Pennsylvania, United States. It is owned by hedge funds and private equity firms and had been operated by NRG Energy. Units 1 and 2, rated at 660 MWe, began operation in 1969. Unit 3, rated at 692 MWe nameplate capacity, was launched in 1977. It employed about 124 people.

During the 2010s, it underwent two bankruptcies within five years. On April 3, 2023, Homer City Generation announced a decision to shut down the power plant and be offline by June 2, 2023. Demolition of the site included destruction of the chimneys and cooling towers on March 22, 2025. The high stack is currently both the tallest chimney to ever be demolished and also the tallest freestanding structure to ever be voluntarily removed in the world, but will eventually be surpassed once the dismantling of the Inco Superstack is completed in 2029.

In April 2025, Homer City Redevelopment announced plans to use existing infrastructure to construct a natural gas plant and data center campus. There have been a number of community-led protests and town hall events over environmental concerns.

== Location ==
The station is located in Center Township, Indiana County, Pennsylvania, occupying approximately 2,400 acres (9.7 km^{2}). The site also includes the 1,800-acre (7.3 km^{2}) Two Lick Reservoir, a water conservation facility which is operated by the station.

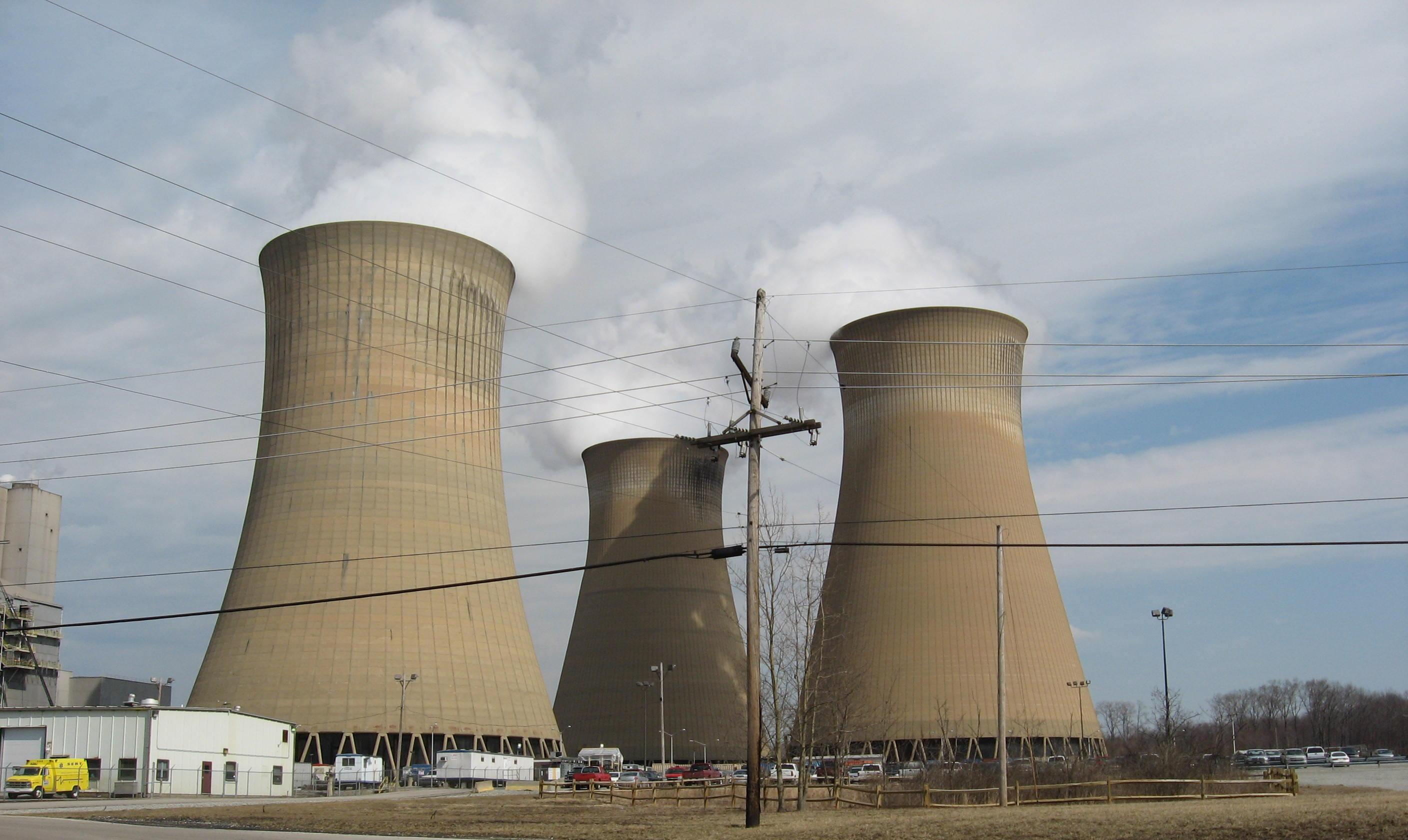
Cooling Towers of the Homer City Generating Station

From there, the Black Lick enters the Conemaugh River, which goes on to meet the Loyalhanna River, creating the Kiskiminetas River, before entering the Allegheny River.

== History ==
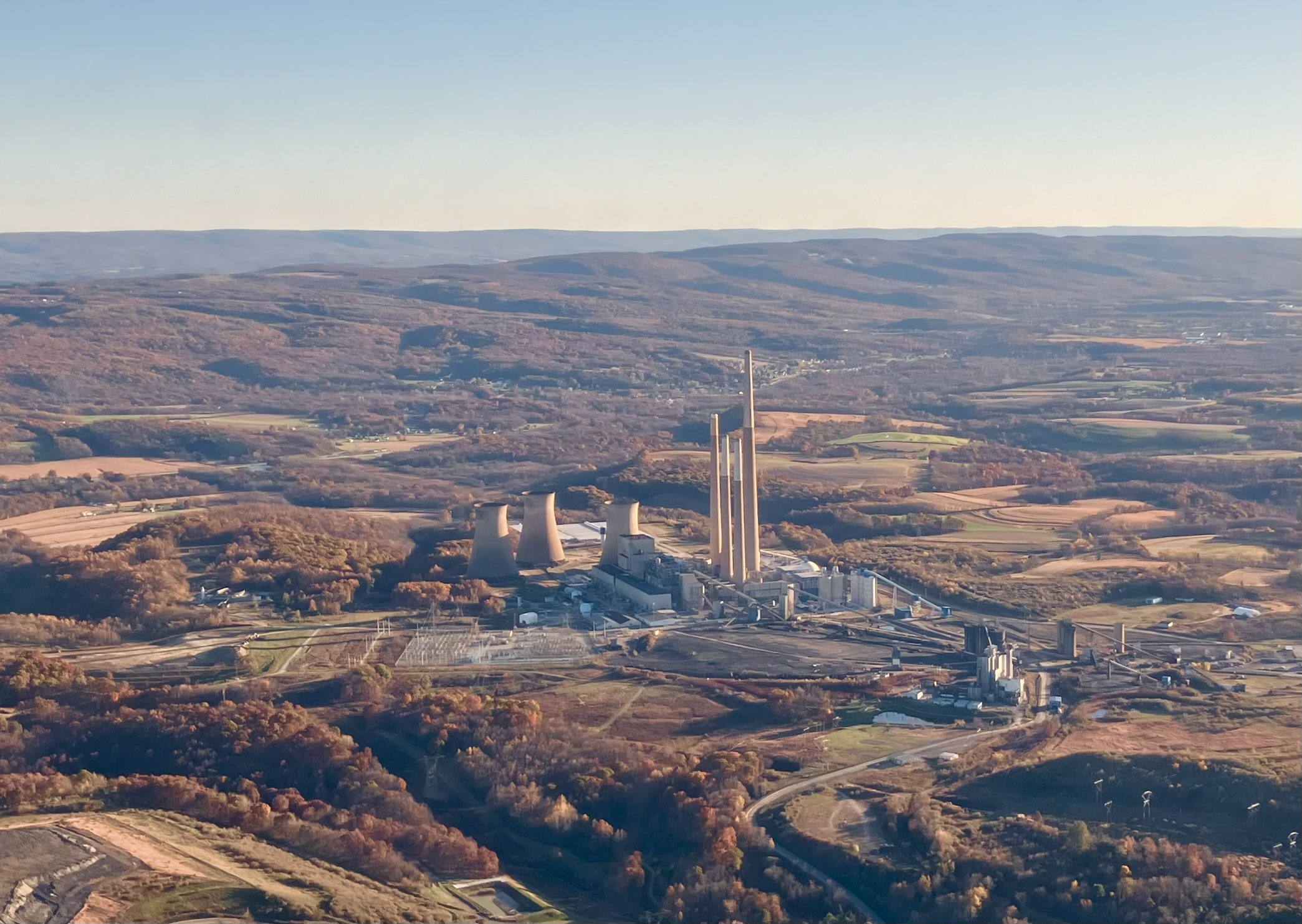
The station in 2024

Constructed in the 1960s by the Pennsylvania Electric Co. (PenElec) and others. In 1969, Units #1 and #2 began operation, while Unit #3 began operating in 1977.

Six workers were injured on February 10, 2011, when a six-inch, high-pressure steam pipe in Unit 1 ruptured and caused an explosion on the sixth floor of a building. Three of the men were airlifted to the Western Pennsylvania Hospital burn center, and three were treated locally. The incident was investigated by the Occupational Safety and Health Administration.

In 2001, affiliates of General Electric bought the plant from Edison International, and subsequently leased it back to them. In 2011, Edison failed to secure financing to add pollution-control devices and announced plans to transfer full control to General Electric. On February 29, 2012, Edison took a $1 billion impairment charge related to the Homer City plant and several other coal-fired power plants. At the end of 2012 full control of the plant was transferred back to General Electric, which hired an NRG affiliate to operate it.

In early 2017, the plant filed for bankruptcy protection.

In early 2022 the facility's owners announced that they were considering deactivating some of its units. The owners initially decided to continue operation, but on April 3, 2023, Homer City Generation announced a decision to shut down the power plant and be offline by June 2, 2023.

The power plant was permanently decommissioned on July 1, 2023. On the morning of March 22, 2025, the chimneys and cooling towers were demolished via explosives.

== Pollution ==
The plant was a major polluter, ranking highly both nationally and within the state; Pennsylvania has ranked it the #2 polluter in the state. Like other coal-fired power plants of this scale, Homer City Generating Station released huge amounts of carbon dioxide as well as mercury, sulfur dioxide, and other toxic or damaging chemicals. Pollution control equipment was added in 1998 to reduce mercury output. In 2012, General Electric had scrubbers installed to further reduce the plant's emissions.

=== Mercury pollution ===
- According to the American environmental activist group Environmental Working Group, Homer City Generating Station produced a total of 2,963 pounds (1,344 kg) of mercury in 1998 alone.

=== Carbon dioxide (CO_{2}) emissions ===
According to Public Citizen: "The plant ranks #33 in the nation for total CO_{2} emissions, contributing 13,745,174 tons of the pollutant primarily responsible for global warming to our atmosphere." The organization Carbon Monitoring for Action (CARMA) reported in 2007 that this plant emitted 12,800,000 tons of CO_{2} and also ranked the facility as 33rd largest CO_{2} emitter in the United States.

=== Sulfur dioxide (SO_{2}) pollution ===
- In 1995, Homer City discharged 127,383 pounds (57.780 metric tons) of SO_{2}.
- In 2003, Homer City discharged 151,262 pounds (68.611 metric tons) of SO_{2} and was ranked the fourth-largest SO_{2} polluter in the nation.
- In 2005, the facility was ranked as the nation's sixth-highest SO_{2} polluter as it discharged 119,771 pounds (54.327 metric tons) of SO_{2} that year.

=== Selenium in wastewater discharges ===
In 2007, the Pennsylvania Department of Environmental Protection (DEP) fined the owners of the Homer City electricity generating station, EME Homer City Generation LP, $200,000 for violating the Pennsylvania Clean Streams Law. The station exceeded its permitted effluent standards for selenium, total suspended solids, and biochemical oxygen demand in its wastewater discharges, and allowed unpermitted discharges of stormwater associated with its flue-gas desulfurization scrubbers.

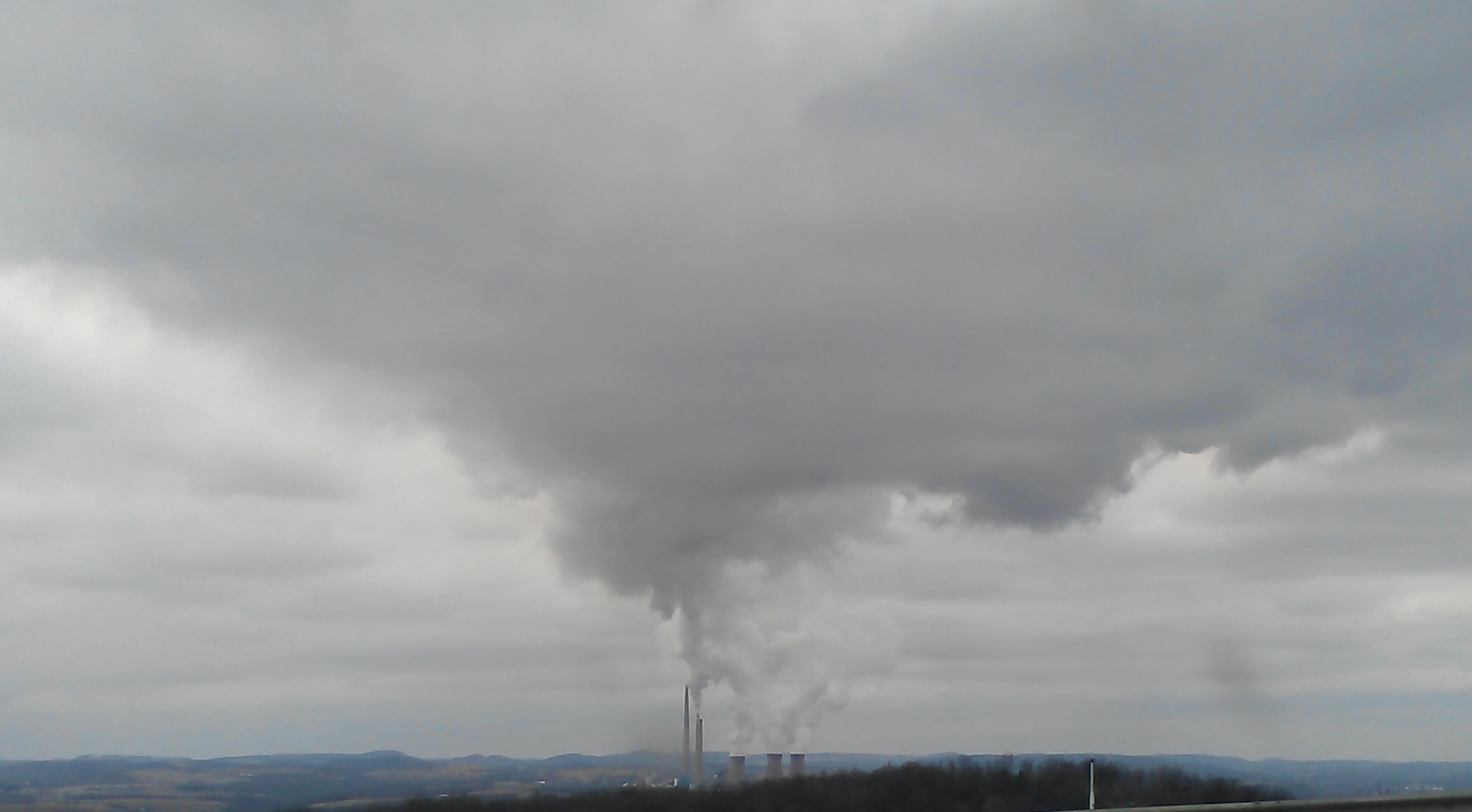

=== Oxides of Nitrogen (NO_{x}) ===
Homer City's three coal boilers installed Selective Catalytic Reduction to reduce ozone-forming NO_{x} emissions in 2000 and 2001. This technology produced up to an 83% reduction in NO_{x} emissions in subsequent years. Since the optimum years of 2005–06, emissions have begun to creep back up towards what they were before the installation of this technology. During the summer of 2012 plant emissions of NO_{x} doubled over the 2005-06 period from 2,300 tons to 4,500 tons, even as electrical generation fell by 30%. Through this same period, the price of natural gas, which competes with coal as a fuel for electrical generation, fell by some 60%. Through the 2013 summer ozone season, this trend in rising emission rates continued resulting in over 6,300 tons of NO_{x} emissions in excess of what could have been achieved had the plant operated at its previously demonstrated optimum rates seen in 2005–06.

== Architecture ==
View of the power plant from Homer-Center High School

The plant's Unit 3 had a 371 m (1,217 ft) tall chimney, which was built in 1977. Until its implosion this chimney was the third-tallest chimney in the world, the second-tallest in North America, and the tallest in the United States. On clear days, it was possible to spot the chimney from as far south as Greensburg, Pennsylvania, and as far east as Ebensburg, Pennsylvania. The chimney was so robust that the demolition attempt failed to bring down the entire structure in its initial attempt as planned.

== Data center ==
As part of the rush to build AI insfrastructure, the former coal-burning power station is investing $15 billion to become a natural gas-powered data center campus that will supply its own energy and could also provide energy to nearby homes. Critics point out the environmental damage that could ensue.

== See also ==
- List of largest power stations in the United States
- List of power stations in Pennsylvania
- List of tallest chimneys
