= Novosemeykino =

Novosemeykino Новосемейкино
- Urban-type settlement
- Interactive map of Novosemeykino
- Location of Novosemeykino Novosemeykino (Samara Oblast)
- Coordinates: 53.3693°N 50.3543°E
- Country: Russia
- Federal subject: Samara Oblast
- Administrative district: Krasnoyarsky District

Population (2010 Census)
  - Total: 9,750
  - Estimate (2021): 10,185 (+4.5%)
- Time zone: UTC+4 (MSK+1)
- Postal code: 446379
- OKTMO ID: 36628163051

Novosemeykino (Russian: Новосемейкино) is an urban locality (an urban-type settlement) in Krasnoyarsky District of Samara Oblast, Russia. Population: 9,750 (2010 census); 9,721 (2002 census); 9,802 (1989 Soviet census).
