= Lafayette transmitter =

Transatlantic VLF-transmitter in Marcheprime, Aquitaine, France

Coordinates: 44°42′31″N 0°48′49″W

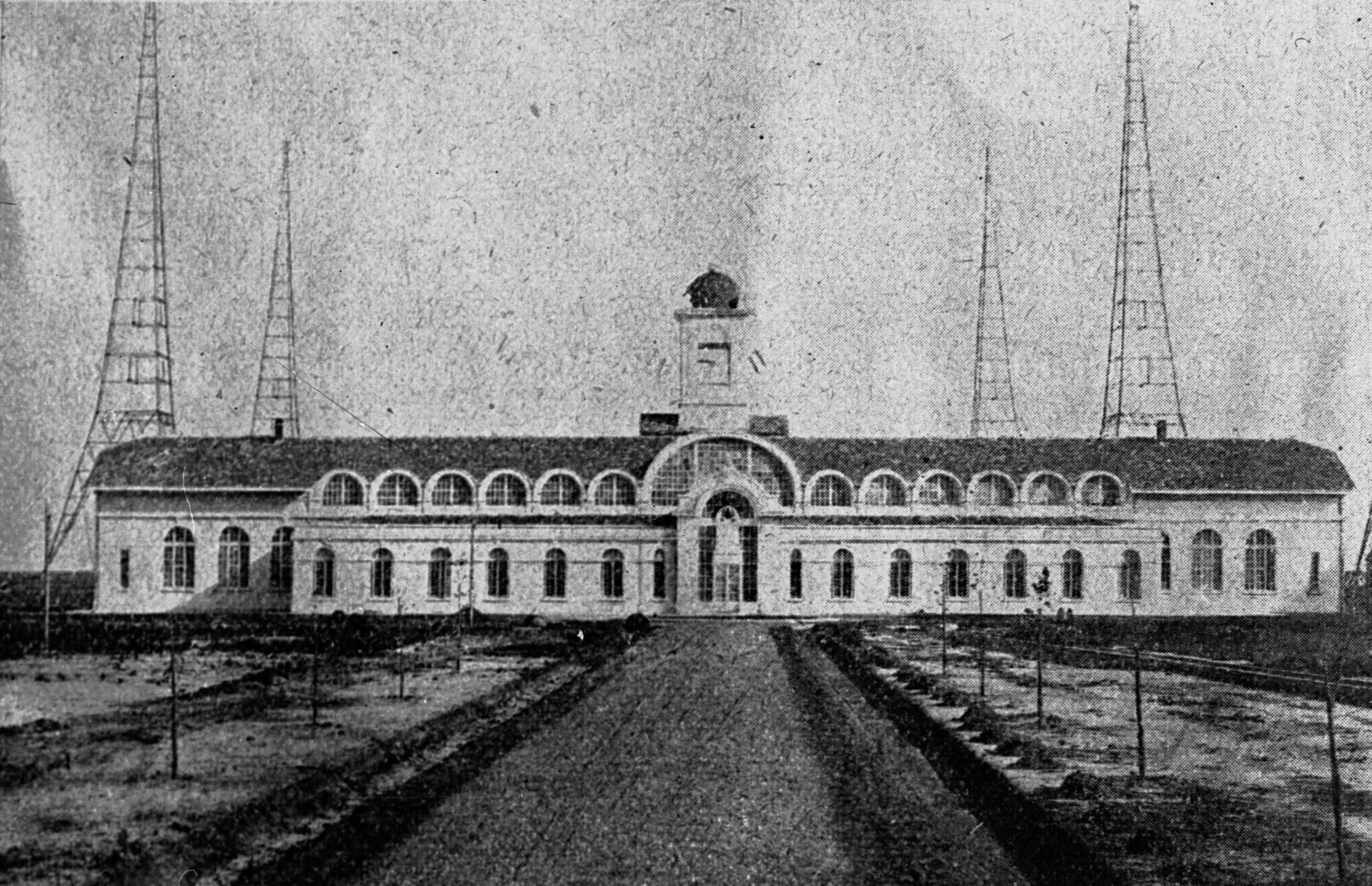
Lafayette transmitter

Lafayette transmitter was a large facility used for transatlantic VLF-transmission, located at Marcheprime, Aquitaine, France. The Lafayette transmitter used an antenna, which was carried by eight free-standing lattice towers (each 250 metres tall) with triangular cross-sections, which were the second tallest free-standing towers in the world. The 250-meter-high tripod pylons were supplied by Pitt-Des Moines Co steelworks in Pittsburgh, Pennsylvania and transported by water to Bordeaux.

In 1944 the installations of Lafayette transmitter were destroyed by retreating German troops. The last of the towers was demolished in 1953.

== See also ==
- Lattice tower
- List of tallest structures in France
- List of famous transmission sites
