= Harllee Branch Power Plant =

Coal-fired power station in Georgia, US

Plant Harllee Branch
- Power plant chimney
- Country: United States
- Location: Putnam County, near Eatonton, Georgia
- Coordinates: 33°11′38″N 83°17′59″W
- Status: Decommissioned
- Commission date: 1961
- Decommission date: 2015
- Owner: Georgia Power

Thermal power station
- Primary fuel: Coal

Power generation
- Units operational: 4
- Nameplate capacity: 1,539 MW (2,064,000 hp)

Plant Harllee Branch was a coal-fired power station located in Putnam County, southeast of Eatonton, Georgia, United States. It was located between Eatonton and Milledgeville, to the southeast. The power plant was owned and operated by Georgia Power. It was named after Harllee Branch Jr., president of Georgia Power.

The power plant had one of the tallest chimneys in the world, built in 1978. The chimney stood 1,007 feet (307 m) tall, and was visible, on clear days, up to approximately 20 miles (32 km) away. Boaters used the chimney to navigate Lake Sinclair, because the power plant was located at US 441, and was a central point on the lake.

Georgia Power closed this plant in April 2015.

The demolition of the chimney was scheduled for October 9, 2016. but was postponed due to Hurricane Matthew. On October 15, shortly after 8 AM, a controlled demolition took down the stack. It is the tallest multi-flue windscreen to ever be demolished. The boiler house was demolished on September 16, 2017, followed by the remainder of the plant 42 days later on October 28.

== See also ==
- List of tallest chimneys
- List of tallest freestanding structures
- List of tallest demolished freestanding structures
