= Vent =

Vent or vents may refer to:

== Science and technology ==
=== Biology ===
- Vent, the cloaca region of an animal
- Vent DNA polymerase, a thermostable DNA polymerase

=== Geology ===
- Hydrothermal vent, a fissure in a planet's surface from which geothermally heated water issues
- Volcano, a point where magma emerges from the Earth's surface and becomes lava

=== Moving gases ===
- Vent (submarine), a valve on a submarine's ballast tanks
- Automatic bleeding valve, a plumbing valve used to automatically release trapped air from a heating system
- Drain-waste-vent system or plumbing drainage venting, pipes leading from fixtures to the outdoors
- Duct (flow), used to deliver and remove air
- Flue, a duct, pipe, or chimney for conveying exhaust gases from a furnace or water heater
- Gas venting, a safe vent in the hydrocarbon and chemical industries
- Medical ventilator, mechanical breathing machine
- Touch hole, a vent on a cannon
- Vent shaft or ventilation shaft

== People ==
- Vents (musician), Australian hip hop MC
- Vents Feldmanis (born 1977), Latvian ice hockey defenceman
- Vents Armands Krauklis (born 1964), Latvian politician and musician
- Vent., taxonomic abbreviation for Étienne Pierre Ventenat (1757–1808), French botanist

== Arts, entertainment, and media ==
=== Music ===
==== Albums and EPs ====
- Vent (album), a 2001 album by Caliban
- Vent (EP), a 2008 release by Sounds of Swami

==== Songs ====
- "Vent" (song), by Collective Soul
- "The Vent", a song by Big K.R.I.T. from Return of 4Eva

=== Other arts, entertainment, and media ===
- Vent (Mega Man), a character in Mega Man ZX
- Vent (radio series), a comedy series produced for BBC Radio 4 in 2006
- The Vent, a column in The Atlanta Journal-Constitution

== Brands and enterprises ==
- Vent (imprint), an imprint of the German group VDM Publishing
- Ventrilo (or Vent), Internet VoIP chat software

== Other uses ==
- Vent (tailoring), a slit up the back of a jacket or coat

== See also ==
- Fissure
- Ventilation (disambiguation)
- Venting (disambiguation)
