= Chimney =

Ventilation for hot gases or smoke

A chimney is an architectural ventilation structure made of masonry, clay or metal that isolates hot toxic exhaust gases or smoke produced by a boiler, stove, furnace, incinerator, or fireplace from human living areas. Chimneys are typically vertical, or as near as possible to vertical, to ensure that the gases flow smoothly, drawing air into the combustion in what is known as the stack, or chimney effect. The space inside a chimney is called the flue. Chimneys are adjacent to large industrial refineries, fossil fuel combustion facilities or part of buildings, steam locomotives and ships.

In the United States, the term smokestack industry refers to the environmental impacts of burning fossil fuels by industrial society, including the electric industry during its earliest history. The term smokestack (colloquially, stack) is also used when referring to locomotive chimneys or ship chimneys, and the term funnel can also be used.

The height of a chimney influences its ability to transfer flue gases to the external environment via stack effect. Additionally, the dispersion of pollutants at higher altitudes can reduce their impact on the immediate surroundings. The dispersion of pollutants over a greater area can reduce their concentrations and facilitate compliance with regulatory limits.

== History ==
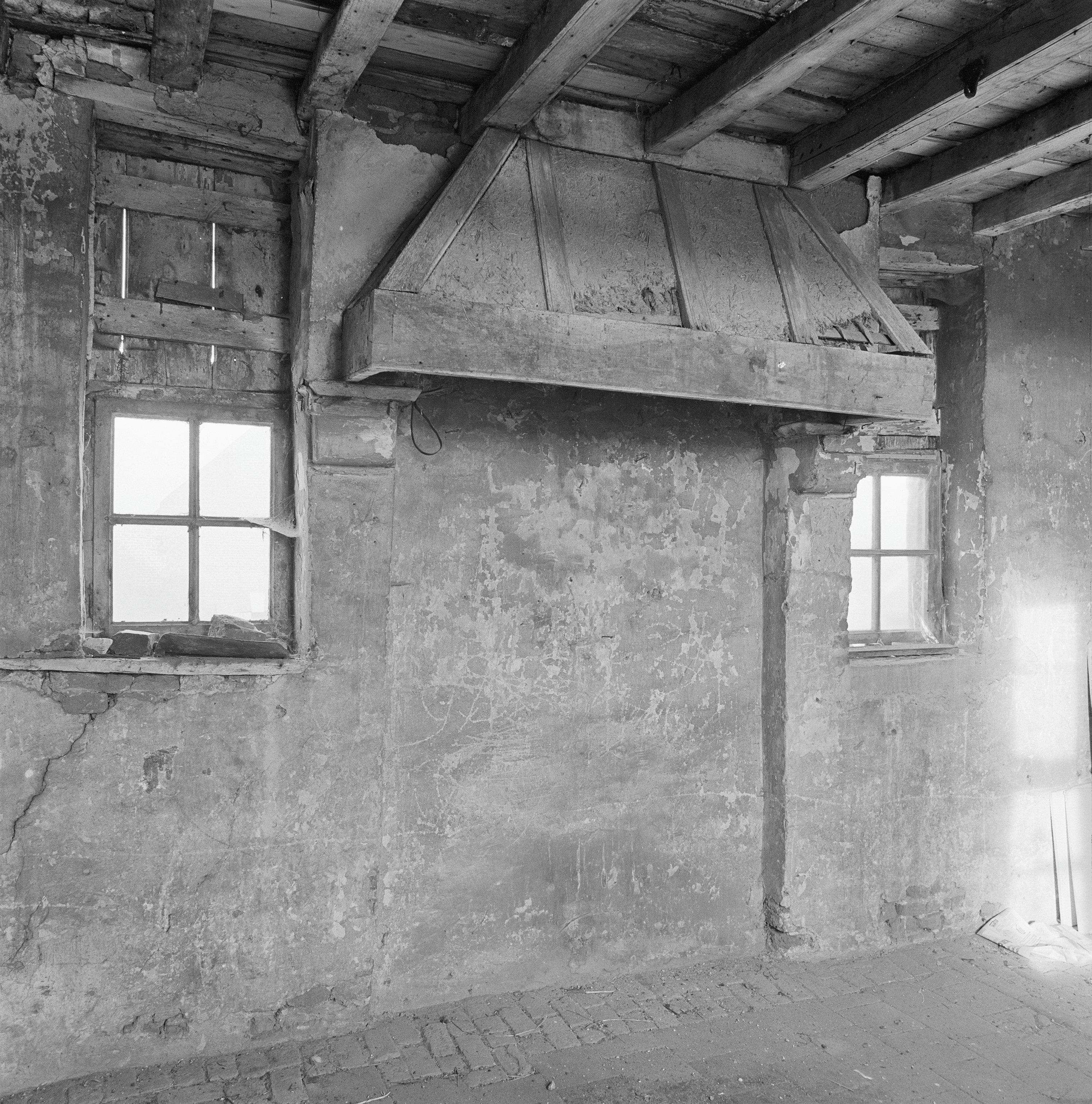
A smoke hood in the Netherlands

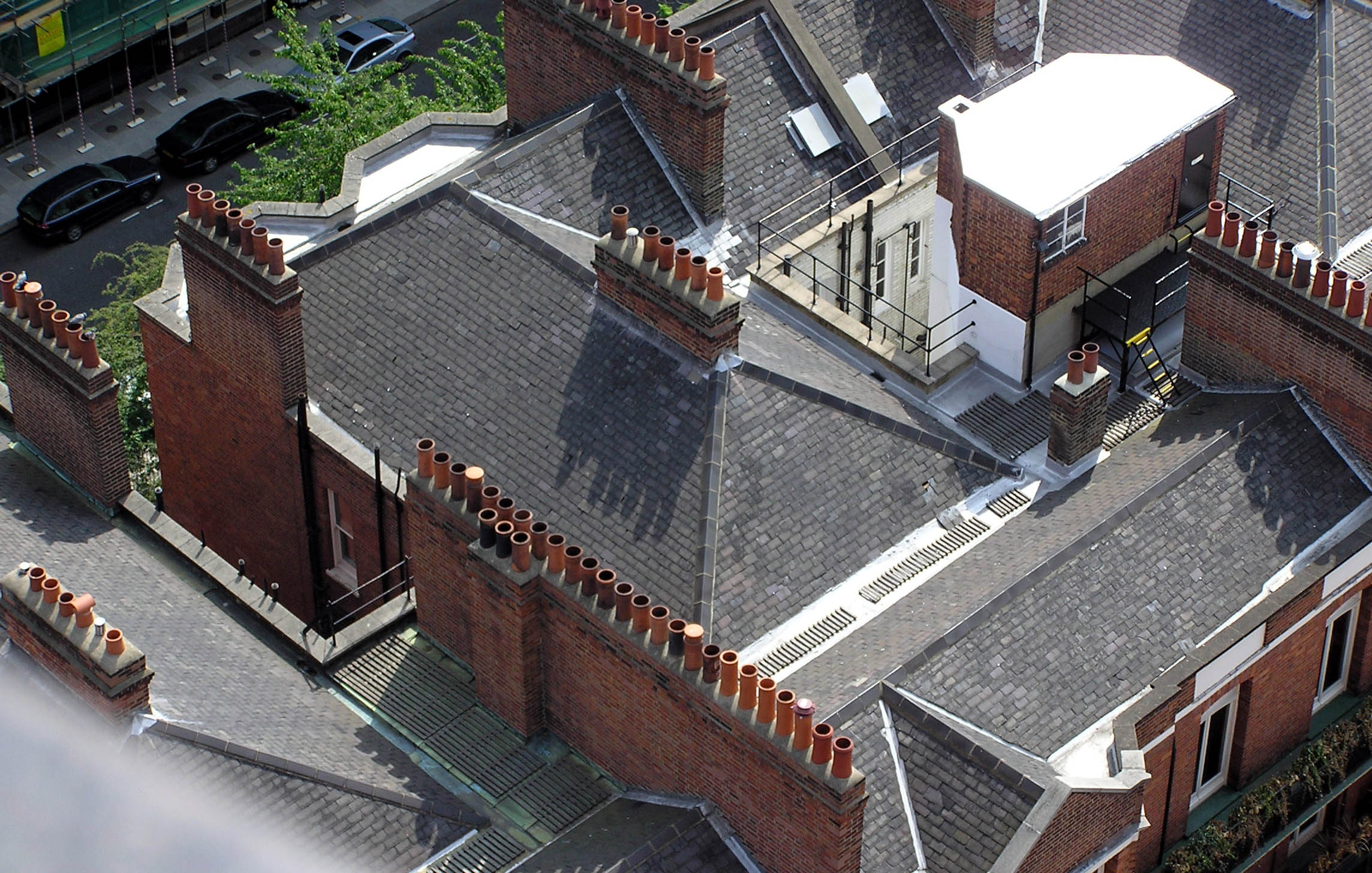
Chimney pots in London, seen from the tower of Westminster Cathedral

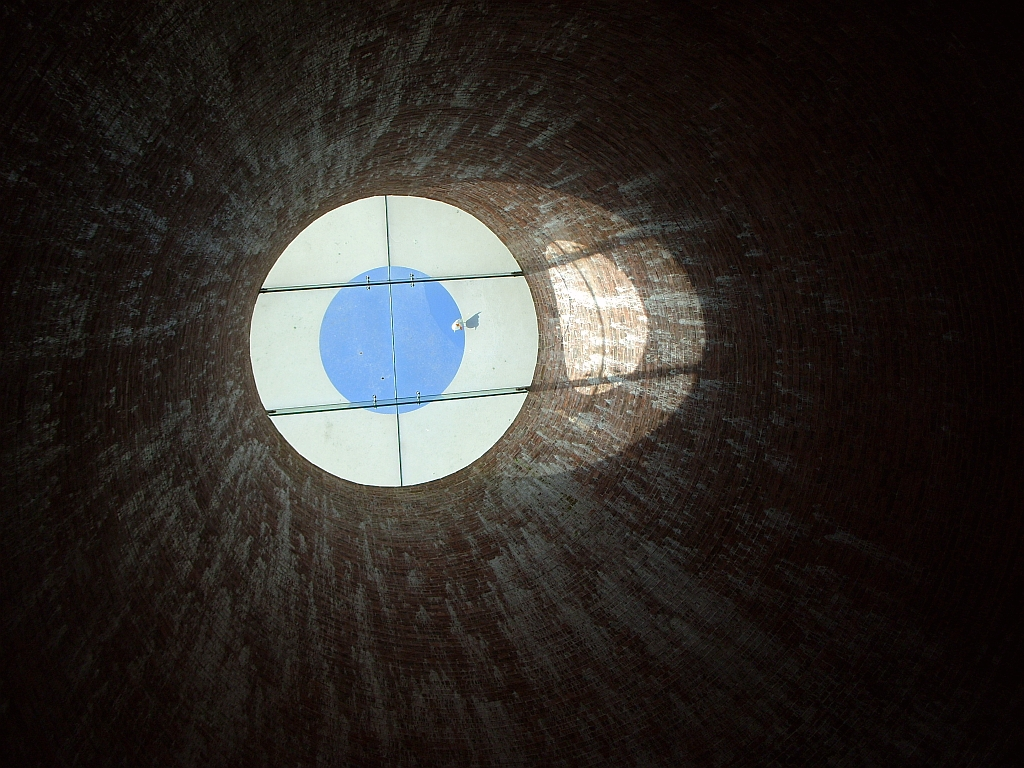
A seagull sits on top of a hot gas cooling chimney at The World of Glass in St. Helens in the United Kingdom

Industrial chimney use dates to the Romans, who drew smoke from their bakeries with tubes embedded in the walls. However, domestic chimneys first appeared in large dwellings in northern Europe in the 12th century. The earliest surviving example of an English chimney is at the keep of Conisbrough Castle in Yorkshire, which dates from 1185 AD, but they did not become common in houses until the 16th and 17th centuries. Smoke hoods were an early method of collecting the smoke into a chimney. These were typically much wider than modern chimneys and started relatively high above the fire, meaning more heat could escape into the room. Because the air going up the shaft was cooler, these could be made of less fireproof materials. Another step in the development of chimneys was the use of built-in ovens which allowed the household to bake at home. Industrial chimneys became common in the late 18th century.

Chimneys in ordinary dwellings were first built of wood and plaster or mud. Since then chimneys have traditionally been built of brick or stone, both in small and large buildings. Early chimneys were of simple brick construction. Later chimneys were constructed by placing the bricks around tile liners. To control downdrafts, venting caps (often called chimney pots) with a variety of designs are sometimes placed on the top of chimneys.

In the 18th and 19th centuries, the methods used to extract lead from its ore produced large amounts of toxic fumes. In the north of England, long near-horizontal chimneys were built, often more than 3 km (2 mi) long, which typically terminated in a short vertical chimney in a remote location where the fumes would cause less harm. Lead and silver deposits formed on the inside of these long chimneys, and periodically workers would be sent along the chimneys to scrape off these valuable deposits.

== Construction ==
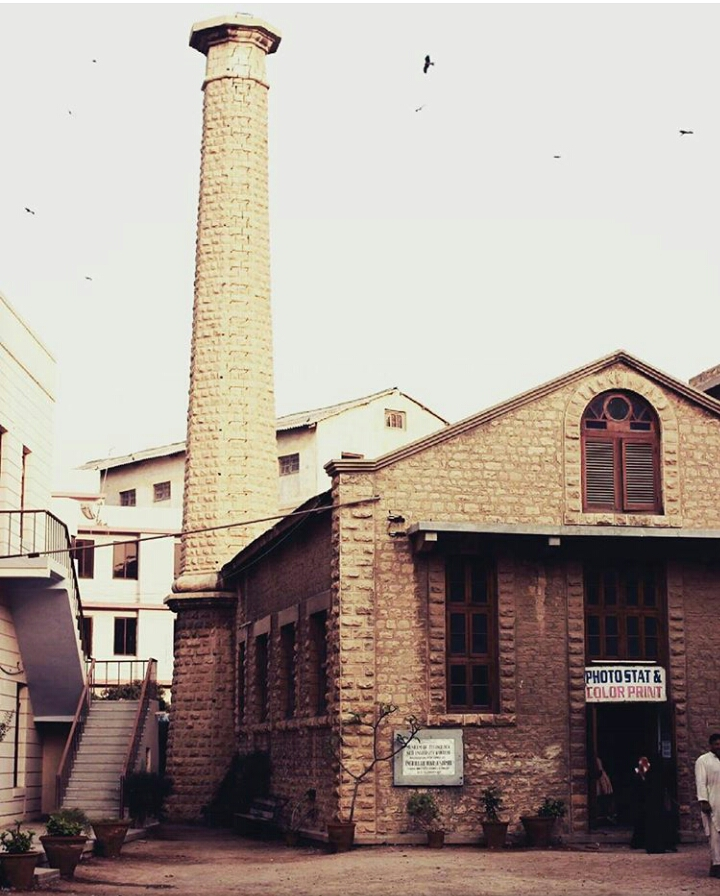
Chimney in NED University

As a result of the limited ability to handle transverse loads with brick, chimneys in houses were often built in a "stack", with a fireplace on each floor of the house sharing a single chimney, often with such a stack at the front and back of the house. Today's central heating systems have made chimney placement less critical, and the use of non-structural gas vent pipe allows a flue gas conduit to be installed around obstructions and through walls.

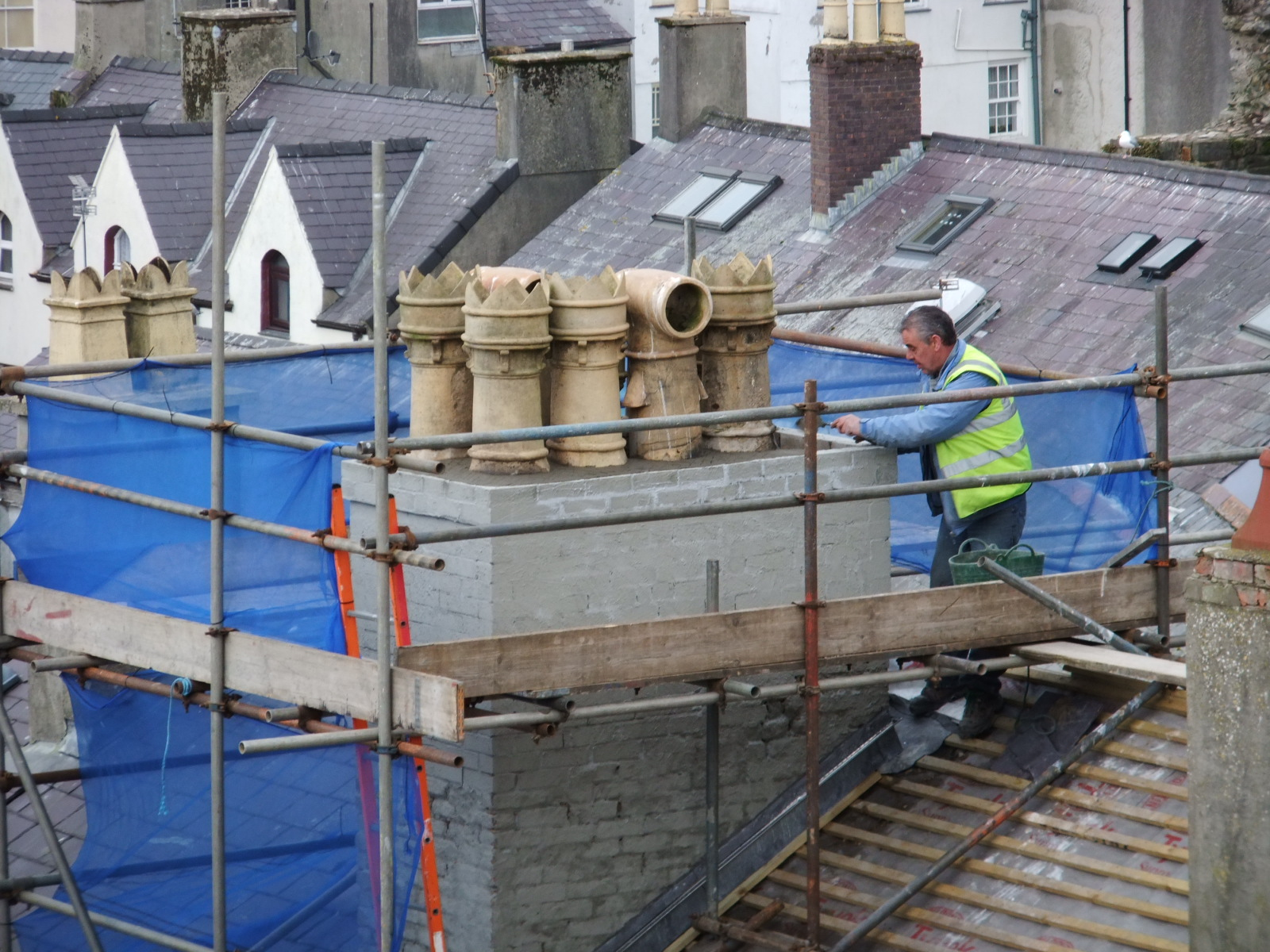
Chimney in North London

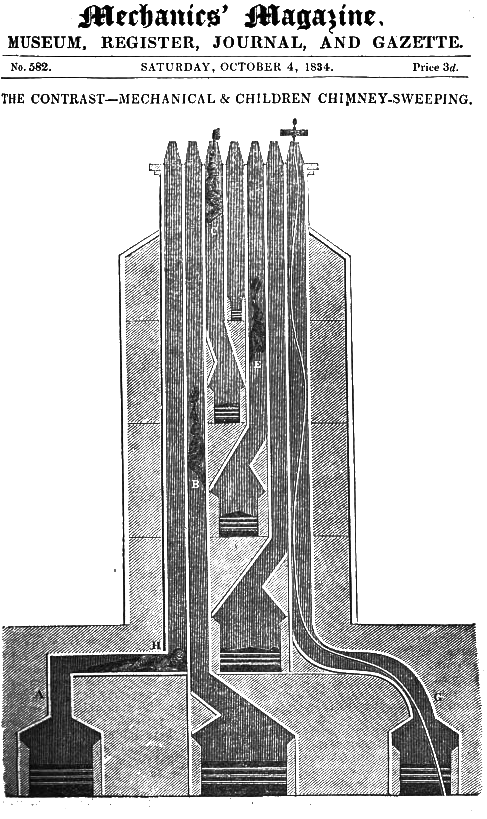
Flue

Most modern high-efficiency heating appliances do not require a chimney. Such appliances are generally installed near an external wall, and a noncombustible wall thimble allows a vent pipe to run directly through the external wall.

On a pitched roof where a chimney penetrates a roof, flashing is used to seal up the joints. The down-slope piece is called an apron, the sides receive step flashing and a cricket is used to divert water around the upper side of the chimney underneath the flashing.

Industrial chimneys are commonly referred to as flue-gas stacks and are generally external structures, as opposed to those built into the wall of a building. They are generally located adjacent to a steam-generating boiler or industrial furnace and the gases are carried to them with ductwork. Today the use of reinforced concrete has almost entirely replaced brick as a structural element in the construction of industrial chimneys. Refractory bricks are often used as a lining, particularly if the type of fuel being burned generates flue gases containing acids. Modern industrial chimneys sometimes consist of a concrete windshield with a number of flues on the inside.

The 300 m (980 ft) high steam plant chimney at the Secunda CTL's synthetic fuel plant in Secunda, South Africa consists of a 26 m (85 ft) diameter windshield with four 4.6 metre diameter concrete flues which are lined with refractory bricks built on rings of corbels spaced at 10 metre intervals. The reinforced concrete can be cast by conventional formwork or sliding formwork. The height is to ensure the pollutants are dispersed over a wider area to meet legal or other safety requirements.

== Residential flue liners ==
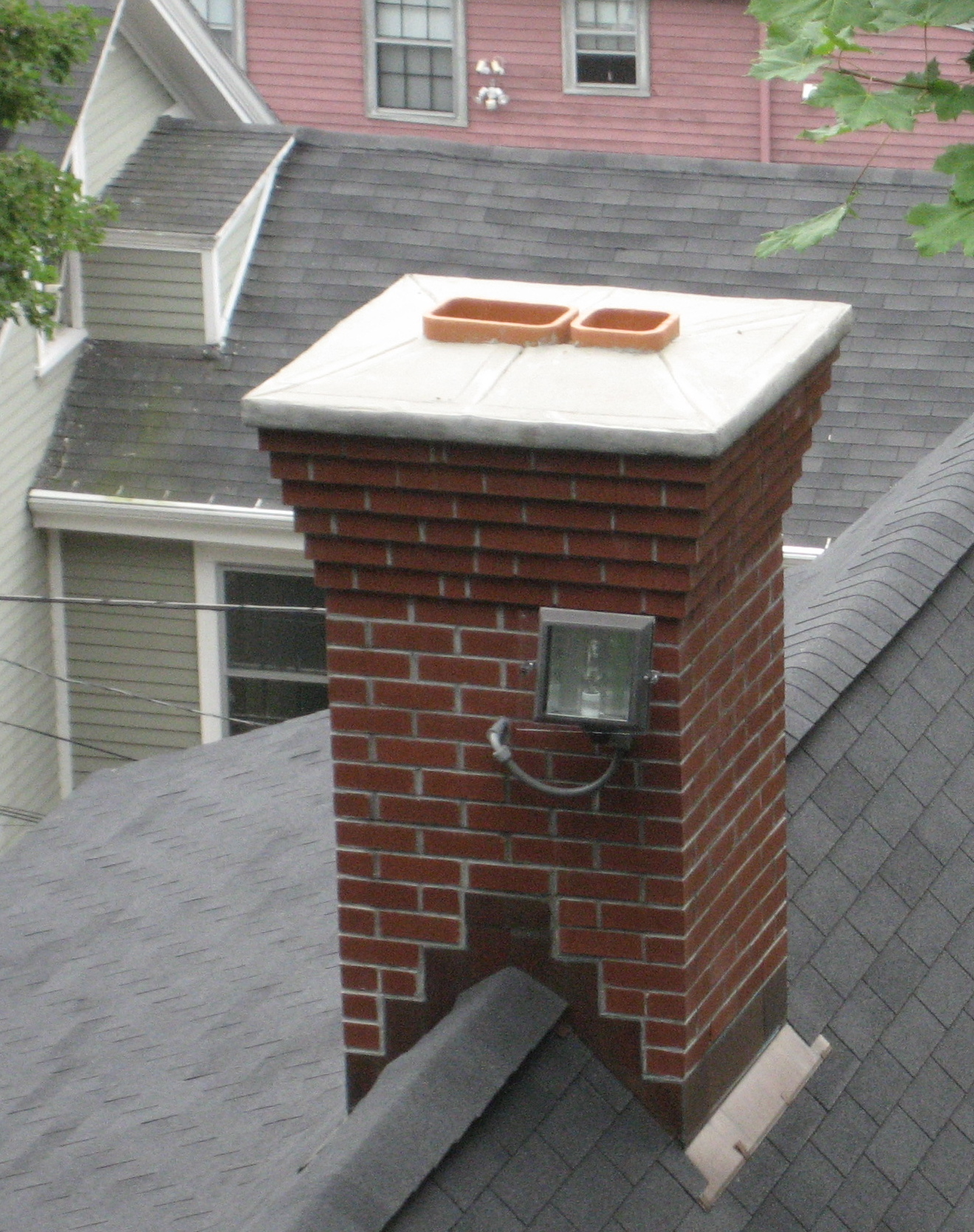
A chimney with two clay-tile flue liners

A flue liner is a secondary barrier in a chimney that protects the masonry from the acidic products of combustion, helps prevent flue gas from entering the house, and reduces the size of an oversized flue. Since the 1950s, building codes in many locations require newly built chimneys to have a flue liner. Chimneys built without a liner can usually have a liner added, but the type of liner needs to match the type of appliance it services. Flue liners may be clay or concrete tile, metal, or poured in place concrete.

Clay tile flue liners are very common in the United States, although it is the only liner that does not meet Underwriters Laboratories 1777 approval and frequently they have problems such as cracked tiles and improper installation. Clay tiles are usually about 2 feet (0.61 m) long, available in various sizes and shapes, and are installed in new construction as the chimney is built. A refractory cement is used between each tile.

Metal liners may be stainless steel, aluminum, or galvanized iron and may be flexible or rigid pipes. Stainless steel is made in several types and thicknesses. Type 304 is used with firewood, wood pellet fuel, and non-condensing oil appliances, types 316 and 321 with coal, and type AL 29-4C is used with high efficiency condensing gas appliances. Stainless steel liners must have a cap and be insulated if they service solid fuel appliances, but following the manufacturer's instructions carefully. Aluminum and galvanized steel chimneys are known as class A and class B chimneys. Class A are either an insulated, double wall stainless steel pipe or triple wall, air-insulated pipe often known by its genericized trade name Metalbestos. Class B are uninsulated double wall pipes often called B-vent, and are only used to vent non-condensing gas appliances. These may have an aluminum inside layer and galvanized steel outside layer.

Concrete flue liners are like clay liners but are made of a refractory cement and are more durable than the clay liners.

Poured in place concrete liners are made by pouring special concrete into the existing chimney with a form. These liners are highly durable, work with any heating appliance, and can reinforce a weak chimney, but they are irreversible.

== Chimney pots, caps, and tops ==
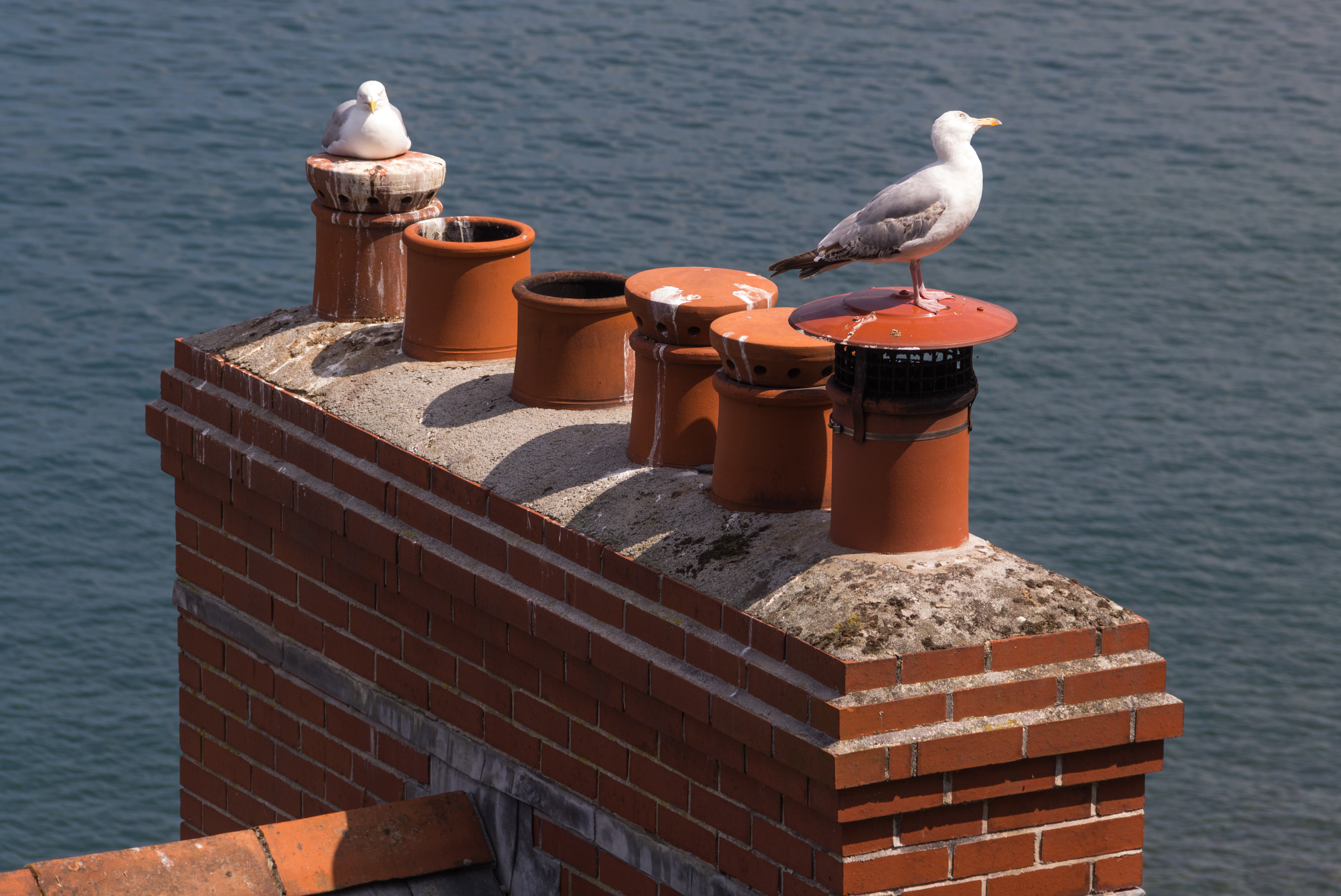
Rows of chimney pots in an English town in 2013

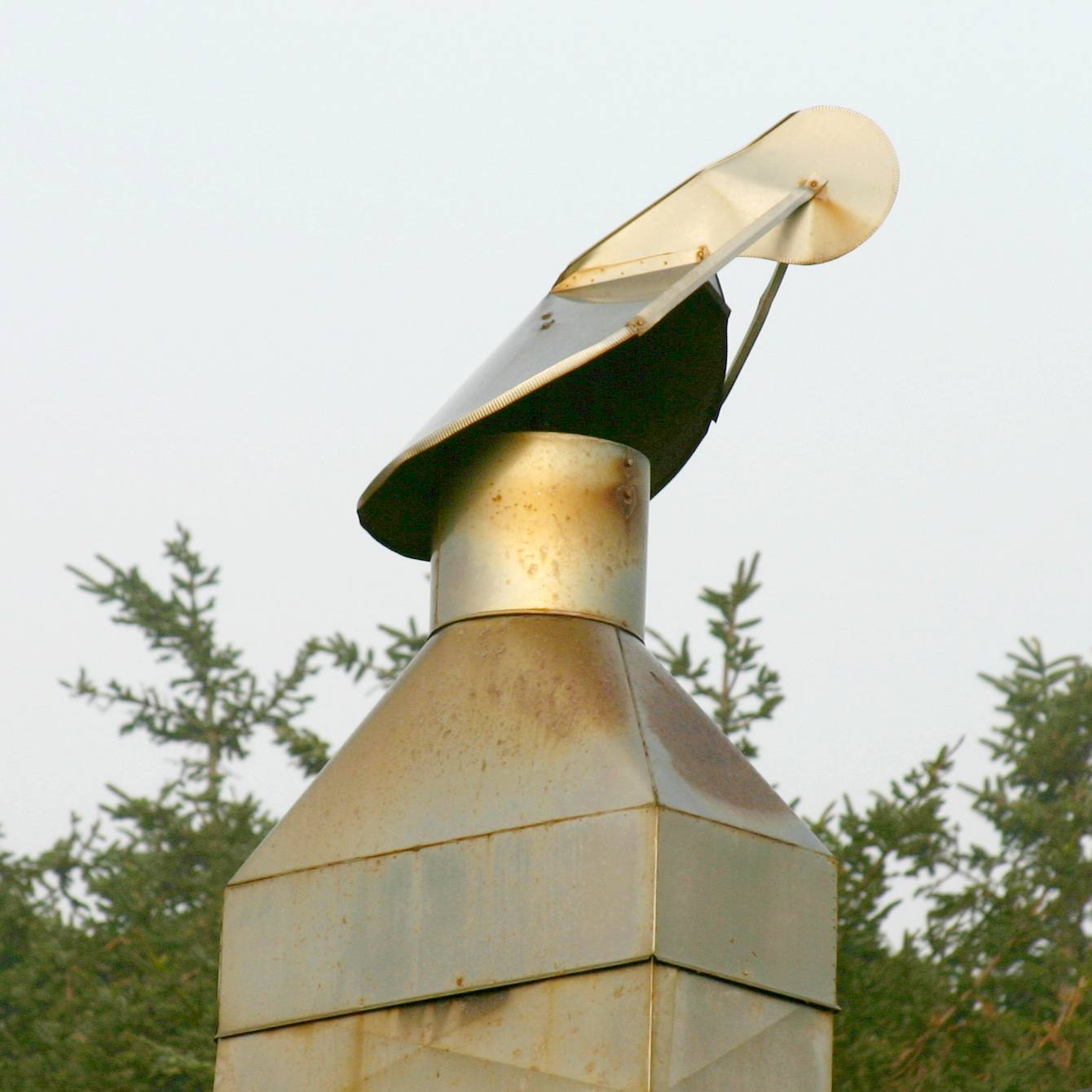
Spanish Conquistador style wind directional cowl found on homes along the windy coast of Oregon

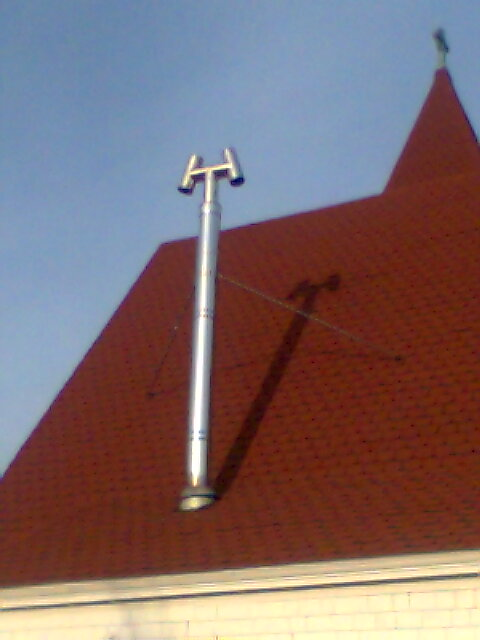
An H-style cowl

A chimney pot is placed on top of the chimney to expand the length of the chimney inexpensively, and to improve the chimney's draft. A chimney with more than one pot on it indicates that multiple fireplaces on different floors share the chimney.

A cowl is placed on top of the chimney to prevent birds and other animals from nesting in the chimney. They often feature a rain guard to prevent rain or snow from going down the chimney. A metal wire mesh is often used as a spark arrestor to minimize burning debris from rising out of the chimney and making it onto the roof. Although the masonry inside the chimney can absorb a large amount of moisture which later evaporates, rainwater can collect at the base of the chimney. Sometimes weep holes are placed at the bottom of the chimney to drain out collected water.

A chimney cowl or wind directional cap is a helmet-shaped chimney cap that rotates to align with the wind and prevent a downdraft of smoke and wind down the chimney.

An H-style cap is a chimney top constructed from chimney pipes shaped like the letter H. It is an age-old method of regulating draft in situations where prevailing winds or turbulences cause downdraft and back-puffing. Although the H cap has a distinct advantage over most other downdraft caps, it fell out of favor because of its bulky design. It is found mostly in marine use but has been regaining popularity due to its energy-saving functionality. The H-cap stabilizes the draft rather than increasing it. Other downdraft caps are based on the Venturi effect, solving downdraft problems by increasing the updraft constantly resulting in much higher fuel consumption.

A chimney damper is a metal plate that can be positioned to close off the chimney when not in use and prevent outside air from entering the interior space, and can be opened to permit hot gases to exhaust when a fire is burning. A top damper or cap damper is a metal spring door placed at the top of the chimney with a long metal chain that allows one to open and close the damper from the fireplace. A throat damper is a metal plate at the base of the chimney, just above the firebox, that can be opened and closed by a lever, gear, or chain to seal off the fireplace from the chimney. The advantage of a top damper is the tight weatherproof seal that it provides when closed, which prevents cold outside air from flowing down the chimney and into the living space—a feature that can rarely be matched by the metal-on-metal seal afforded by a throat damper. Additionally, because the throat damper is subjected to intense heat from the fire directly below, it is common for the metal to become warped over time, thus further degrading the ability of the throat damper to seal. However, the advantage of a throat damper is that it seals off the living space from the air mass in the chimney, which, especially for chimneys positioned on an outside of wall of the home, is generally very cold. It is possible in practice to use both a top damper and a throat damper to obtain the benefits of both. The two top damper designs currently on the market are the Lyemance (pivoting door) and the Lock Top (translating door).

In the late Middle Ages in Western Europe the design of stepped gables arose to allow maintenance access to the chimney top, especially for tall structures such as castles and great manor houses.

== Chimney draught or draft ==
The stack effect in chimneys: the gauges represent absolute air pressure and the airflow is indicated with light grey arrows. The gauge dials move clockwise with increasing pressure.

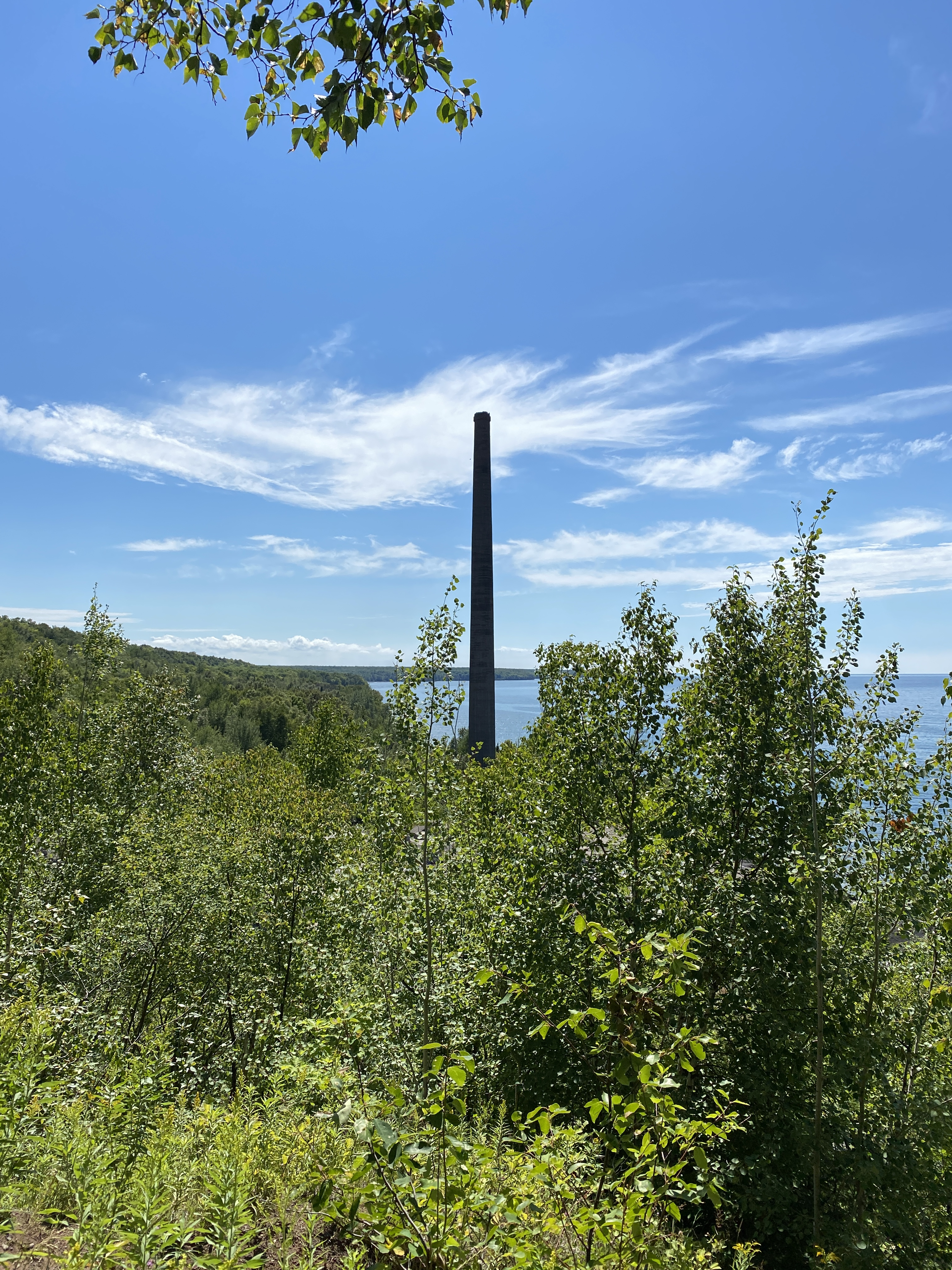
An abandoned chimney in Freda, Michigan

When coal, oil, natural gas, wood, or any other fuel is combusted in a stove, oven, fireplace, hot water boiler, or industrial furnace, the hot combustion product gases that are formed are called flue gases. Those gases are generally exhausted to the ambient outside air through chimneys or industrial flue-gas stacks (sometimes referred to as smokestacks).

The combustion flue gases inside the chimneys or stacks are much hotter than the ambient outside air and therefore less dense than the ambient air. That causes the bottom of the vertical column of hot flue gas to have a lower pressure than the pressure at the bottom of a corresponding column of outside air. That higher pressure outside the chimney is the driving force that moves the required combustion air into the combustion zone and also moves the flue gas up and out of the chimney. That movement or flow of combustion air and flue gas is called "natural draught/draft", "natural ventilation", "chimney effect", or "stack effect". The taller the stack, the more draught or draft is created. There can be cases of diminishing returns: if a stack is overly tall in relation to the heat being sent out of the stack, the flue gases may cool before reaching the top of the chimney. This condition can result in poor drafting, and in the case of wood burning appliances, the cooling of the gases before emission can cause creosote to condense near the top of the chimney. The creosote can restrict the exit of flue gases and may pose a fire hazard.

Designing chimneys and stacks to provide the correct amount of natural draft involves a number of design factors, many of which require iterative trial-and-error methods.

As a "first guess" approximation, the following equation can be used to estimate the natural draught/draft flow rate by assuming that the molecular mass (i.e., molecular weight) of the flue gas and the external air are equal and that the frictional pressure and heat losses are negligible:
$$Q = C\, A\, \sqrt {2\,g\,H\,\frac{T_i - T_e}{T_e}}$$
where:

- Q = chimney draught/draft flow rate, m^{3}/s
- A = cross-sectional area of chimney, m^{2} (assuming it has a constant cross-section)
- C = discharge coefficient (usually taken to be from 0.65 to 0.70)
- g = gravitational acceleration, 9.807 m/s^{2}
- H = height of chimney, m
- T_{i} = average temperature inside the chimney, K
- T_{e} = external air temperature, K.

Combining two flows into chimney: A_{t}+A_{f}<A, where A_{t}=7.1 inch^{2} is the minimum required flow area from water heater tank and A_{f}=19.6 inch^{2} is the minimum flow area from a furnace of a central heating system.

== Draft hood ==
Gas fired appliances must have a draft hood to cool combustion products entering the chimney and prevent updrafts or downdrafts.

For aircraft operating near chimneys, exhausts or plumes may cause turbulence, reduced visibility, oxygen depletion, engine contamination, exposure to gaseous oxides, and icing. These effects are more pronounced in cold, calm and stable air when the plume is hot. Pilots are instructed to fly upwind away from the chimney to minimize the impact.

== Maintenance and problems ==
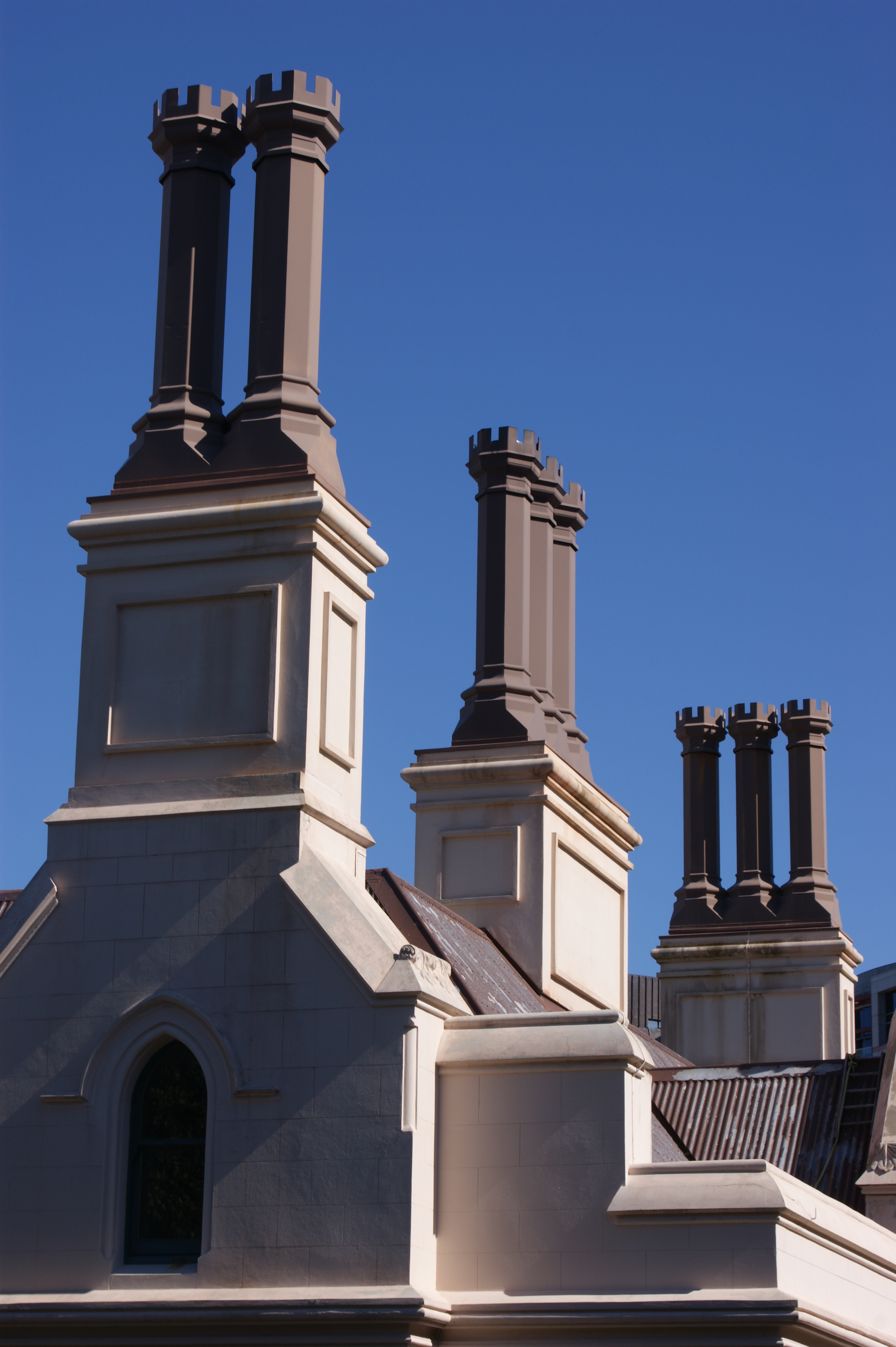
Chimneys on the Parliamentary Library in Wellington, New Zealand

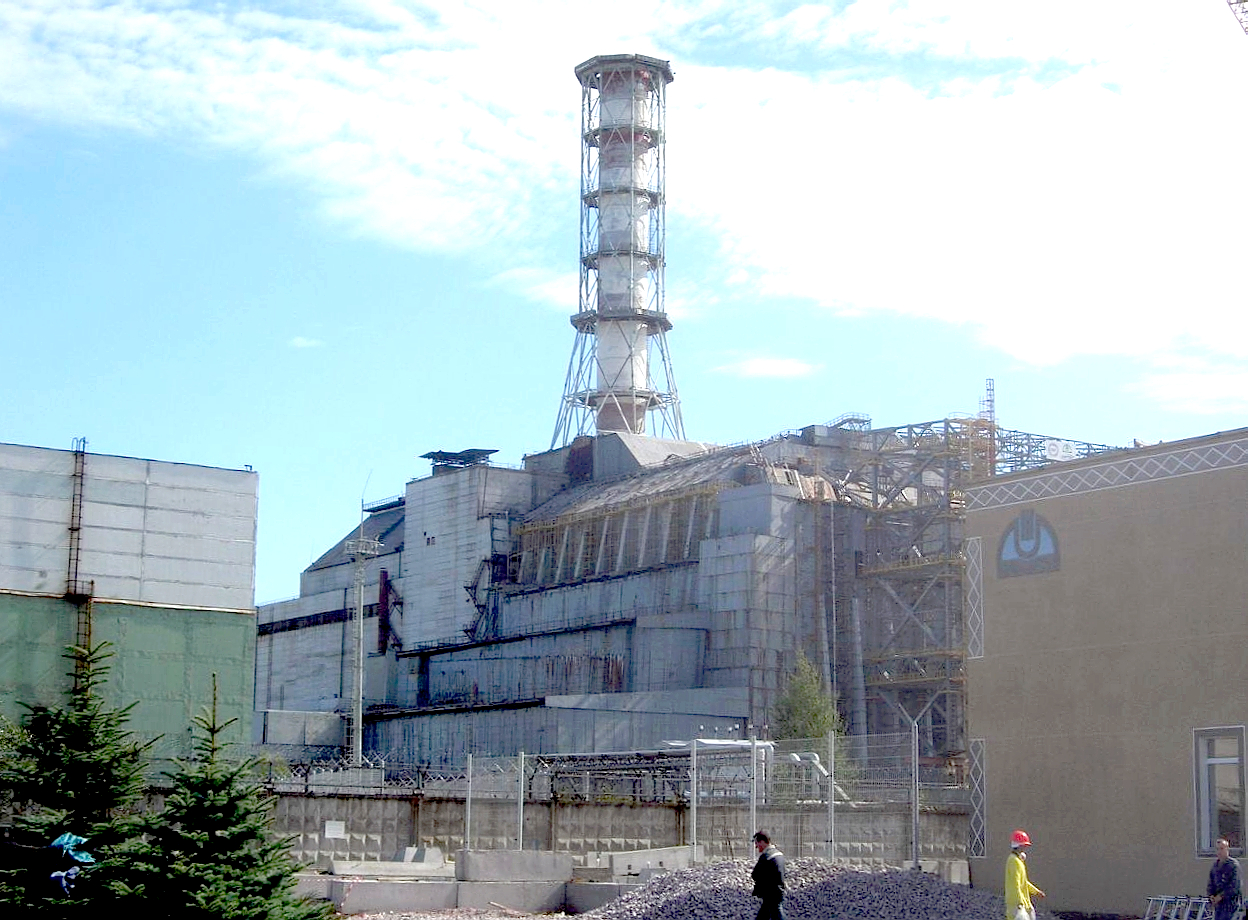
A non-operational chimney at Chernobyl reactor#4 preserved as part of the Chernobyl Nuclear Power Plant sarcophagus

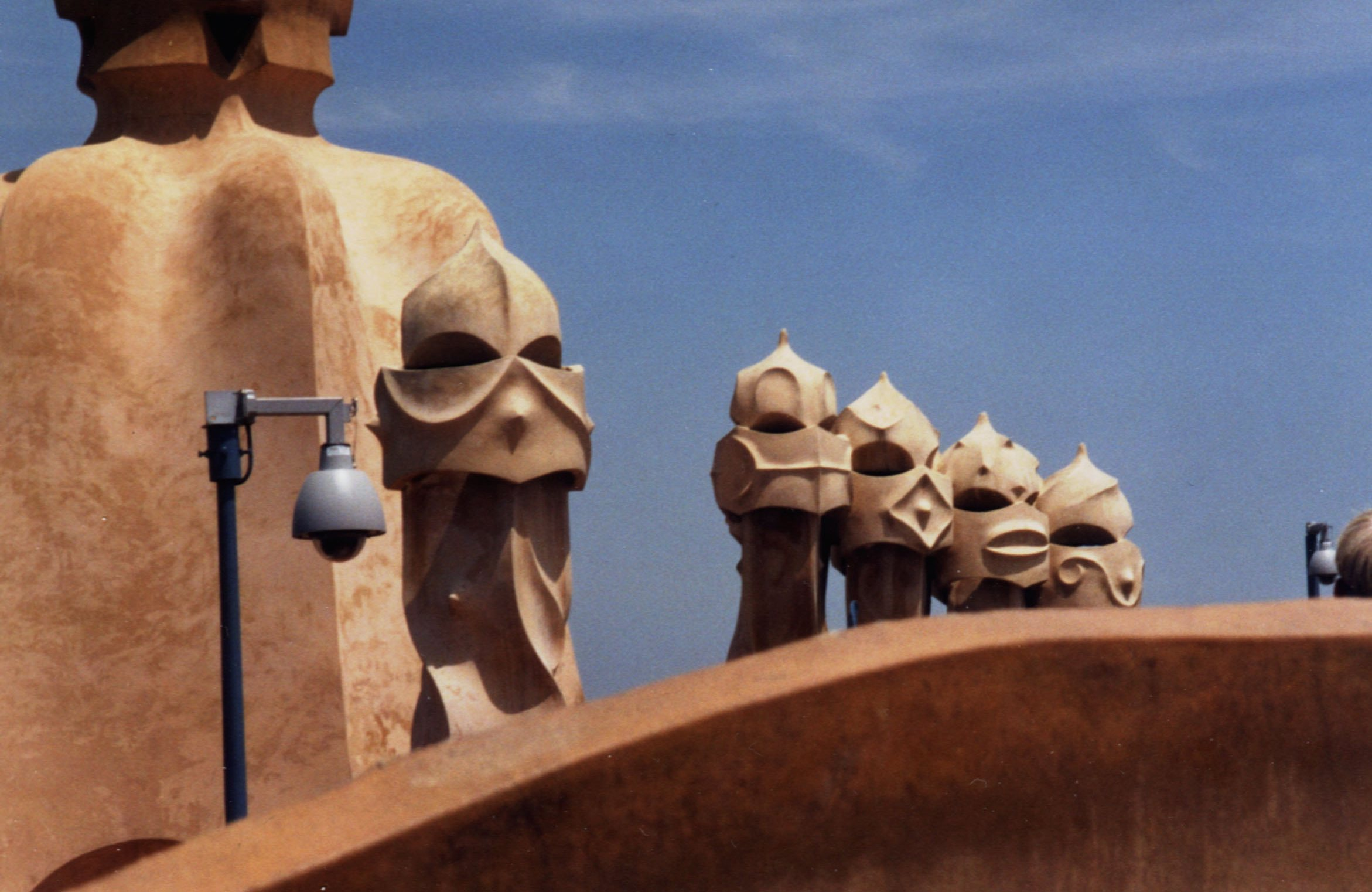
Modernist chimneys on the Casa Milà (Barcelona, Spain), by Antoni Gaudí

A characteristic problem of chimneys is they develop deposits of creosote on the walls of the structure when used with wood as a fuel. Deposits of this substance can interfere with the airflow and more importantly, they are combustible and can cause dangerous chimney fires if the deposits ignite in the chimney.

Heaters that burn natural gas drastically reduce the amount of creosote buildup due to natural gas burning much cleaner and more efficiently than traditional solid fuels. While in most cases there is no need to clean a gas chimney on an annual basis that does not mean that other parts of the chimney cannot fall into disrepair. Disconnected or loose chimney fittings caused by corrosion over time can pose serious dangers for residents due to leakage of carbon monoxide into the home. Thus, it is recommended—and in some countries even mandatory—that chimneys be inspected annually and cleaned on a regular basis to prevent these problems. The workers who perform this task are called chimney sweeps or steeplejacks. This work used to be done largely by child labour and, as such, features in Victorian literature. In the Middle Ages in some parts of Europe, a stepped gable design was developed, partly to provide access to chimneys without use of ladders.

Masonry (brick) chimneys have also proven to be particularly prone to crumbling during earthquakes. Government housing authorities in cities prone to earthquakes such as San Francisco, Los Angeles, and San Diego now recommend building new homes with stud-framed chimneys around a metal flue. Bracing or strapping old masonry chimneys has not proven to be very effective in preventing damage or injury from earthquakes. It is now possible to buy "faux-brick" facades to cover these modern chimney structures.

Other potential problems include:

- "spalling" brick, in which moisture seeps into the brick and then freezes, cracking and flaking the brick and loosening mortar seals.
- shifting foundations, which may degrade integrity of chimney masonry
- nesting or infestation by unwanted animals such as squirrels, racoons, or chimney swifts
- chimney leaks
- drafting issues, which may allow smoke inside building
- issues with fireplace or heating appliance may cause unwanted degradation or hazards to chimney

== Chimneys of special interest ==
=== Chimneys with observation decks ===
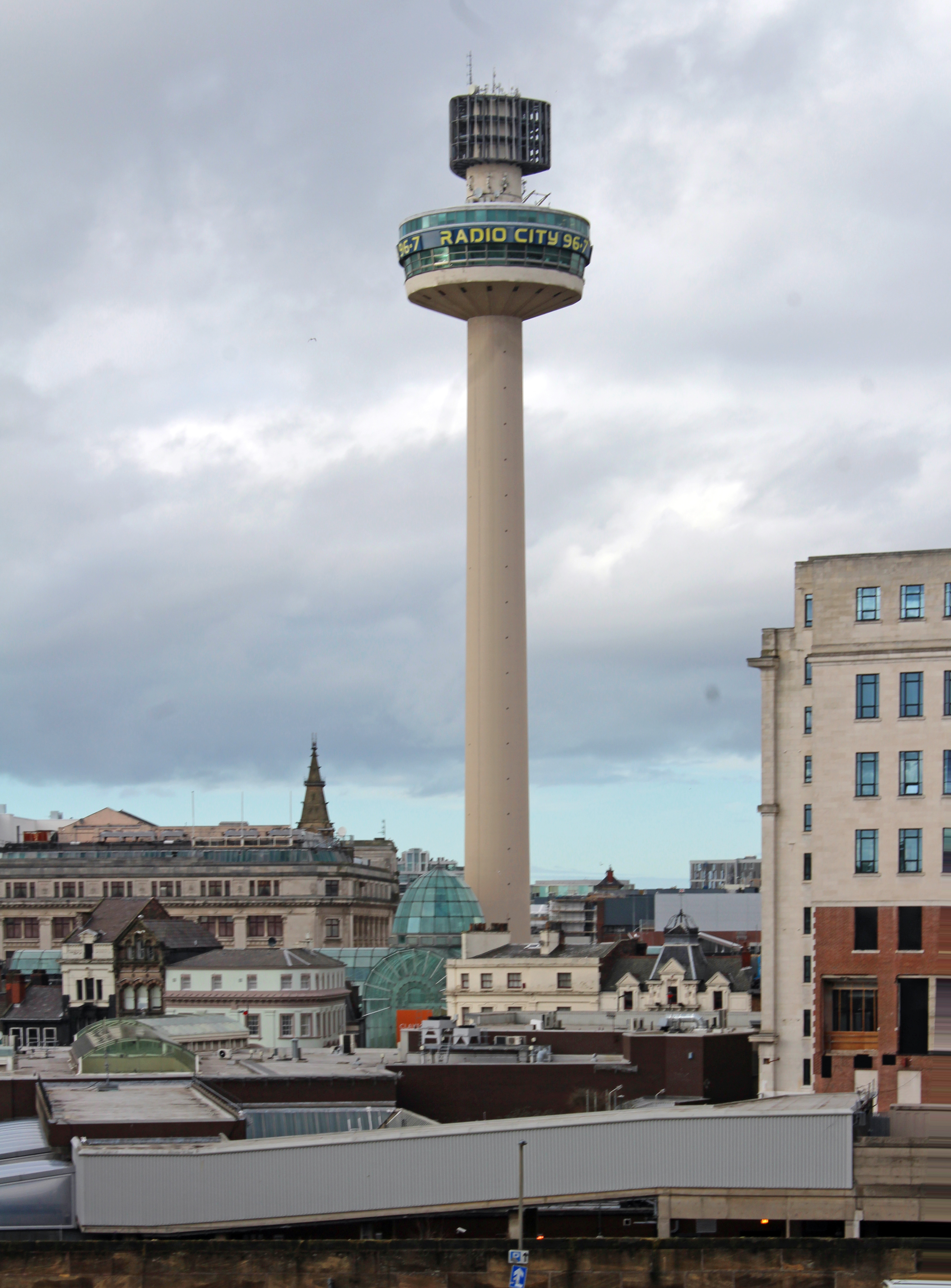
Radio City Tower in Liverpool. Although it looks like a television tower made of concrete, it was originally designed as ventilation shaft of a nearby mall

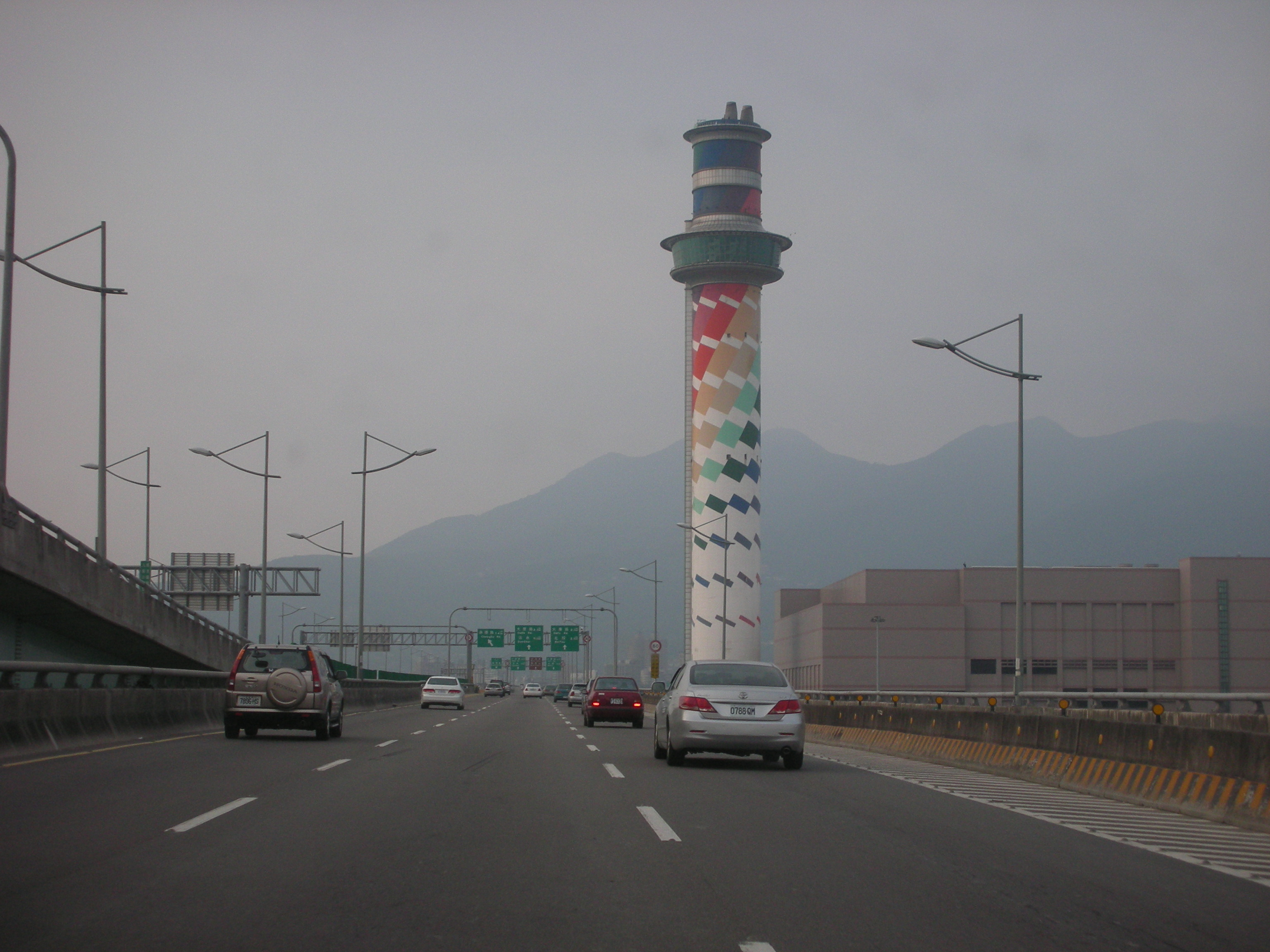
Chimney of Beitou Refuse Incinerator housing a revolving restaurant and a public observation deck

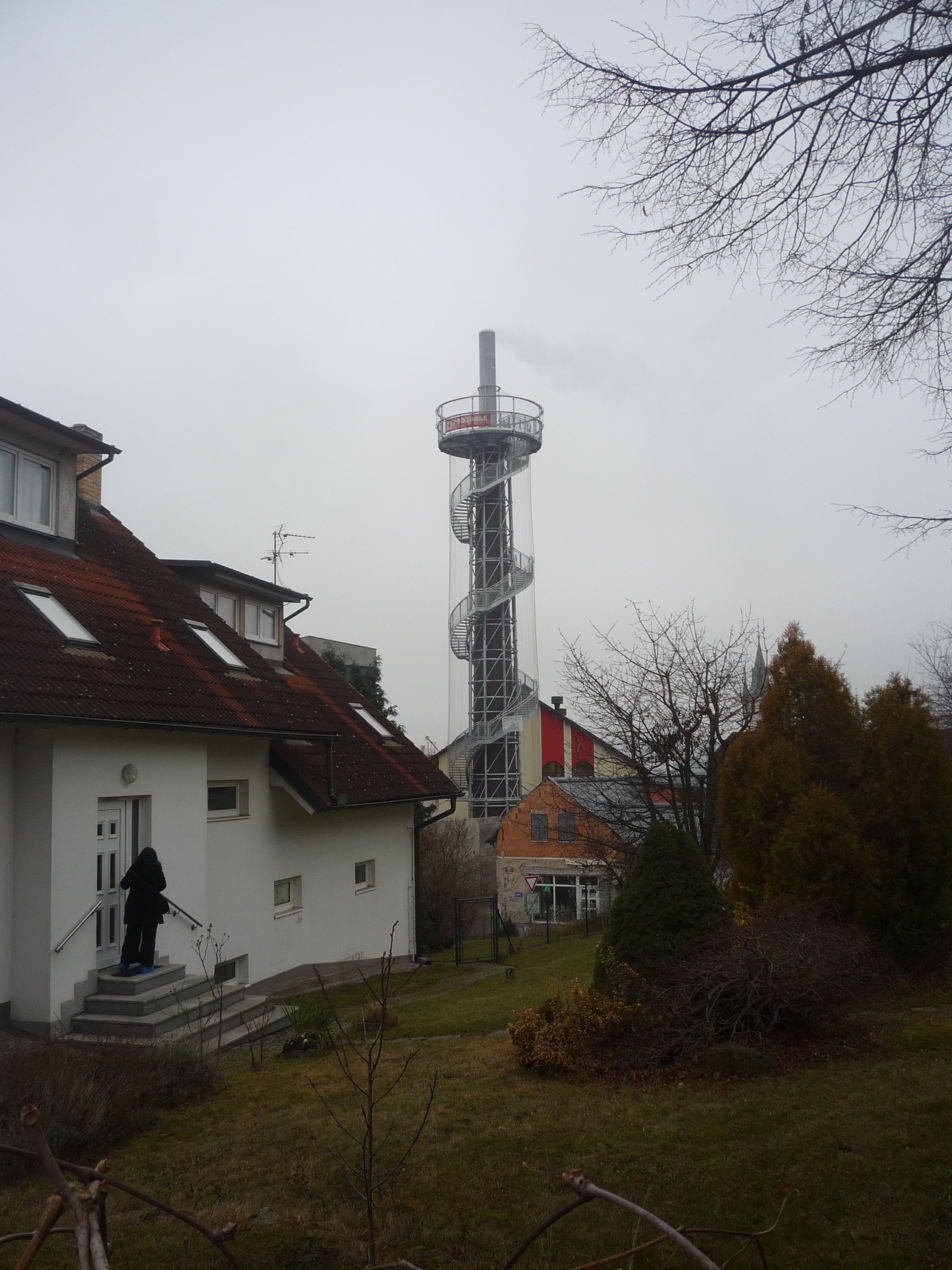
Bernard Brewery Chimney in Humpolec, to which in 2020/2021 an observation deck accessible over a spiral staircase was added

Several chimneys with observation decks were built. The following possibly incomplete list shows them.

| Name | Country | Town | Coordinates | Year of completion | Total height | Height of observation deck | Remarks |
|---|---|---|---|---|---|---|---|
| Chimney of Beitou Refuse Incineration Plant | Taiwan | Teipei | 25°06′29″N 121°29′58″E | 2000 | 150 m (492 ft) | 116 m (381 ft) | revolving restaurant in a height of 120 metres (394 ft) |
| Radio City Tower | United Kingdom | Liverpool | 53°24′23″N 2°58′55″W | 1971 | 148 m (486 ft) | 124.7 m (409 ft) | chimney for the heating system of a nearby mall |
| Large Chimney of Warsaw Refuse Incineration Plant | Poland | Warsaw | 52°15′41″N 21°06′18″E | 2024 | 80 m (262 ft) | | observation deck only accessible at guided tours through the facility |
| Bernard Brewery Chimney | Czech | Humpolec | 49°32′23″N 15°21′36″E | | 40.7 m (134 ft) | 33 m (108 ft) | observation deck added in 2020/21 |
| Dům Dětí a Mládeže v Modřanech | Czech | Prague | 50°00′44″N 14°24′49″E | 2004 | 15 m (49 ft) | 12 m (39 ft) | observation platform on chimney of the roof of a youth centre |
| Chimney of Zenner Heating Building | Germany | Berlin | 52°29′17″N 13°28′38″E | 1955 | 15 m (49 ft) | 12 m (39 ft) | perhaps never in use as observation tower |

=== Chimneys used as electricity pylon ===
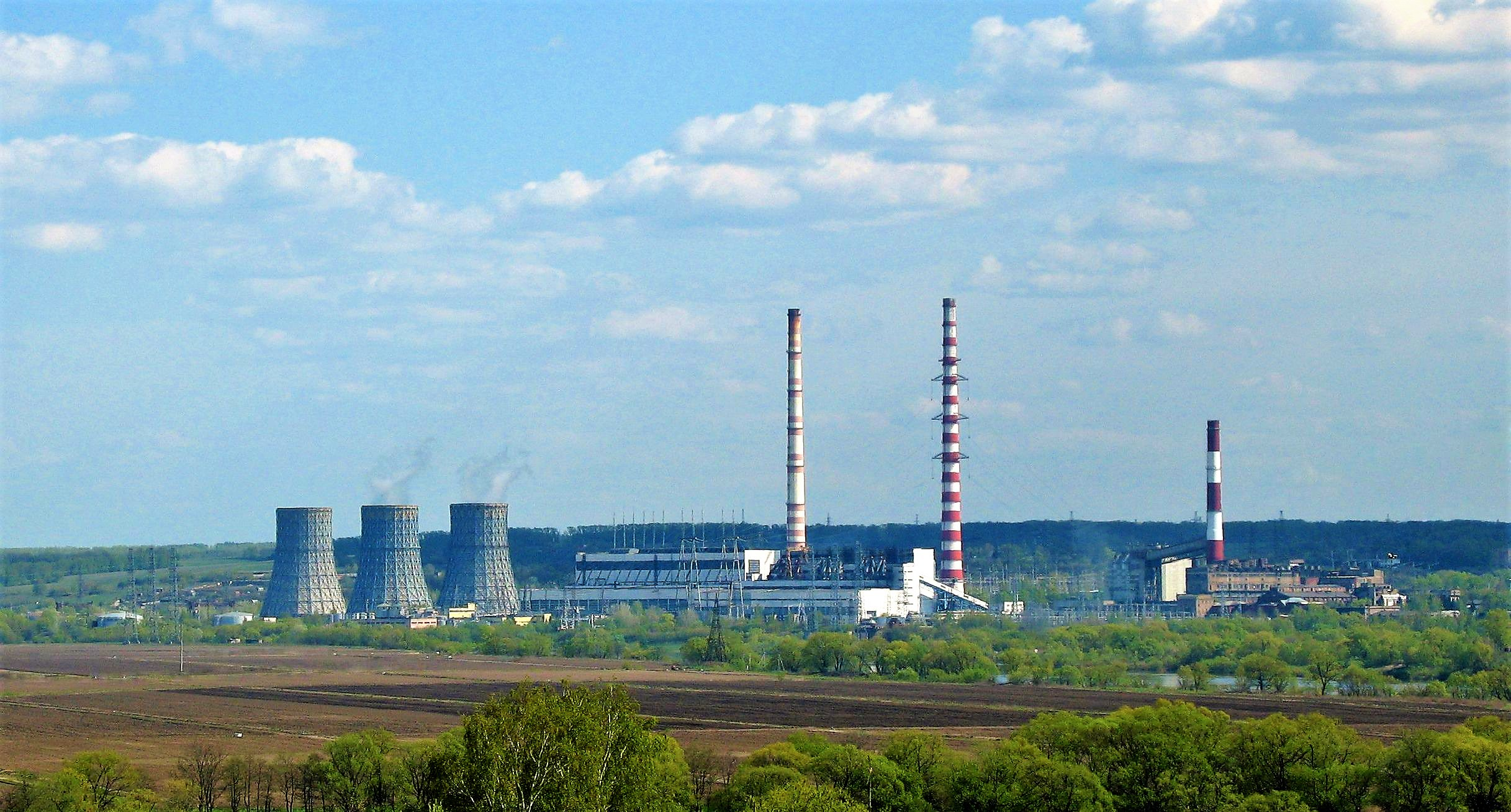
Kashira Power Plant with one chimney serving also as high voltage pylon

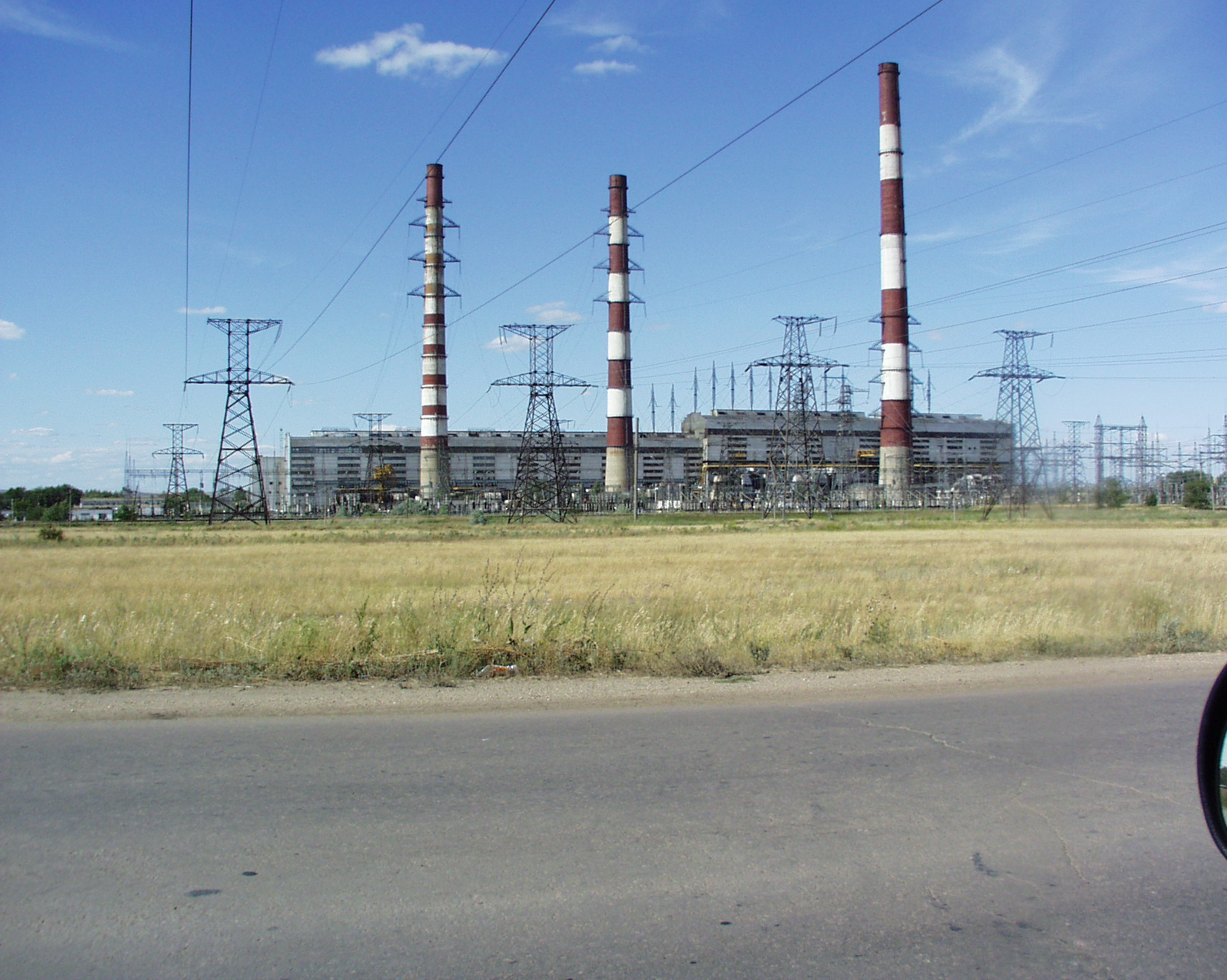
Iriklinskaya Power Station with chimneys used as high voltage pylons

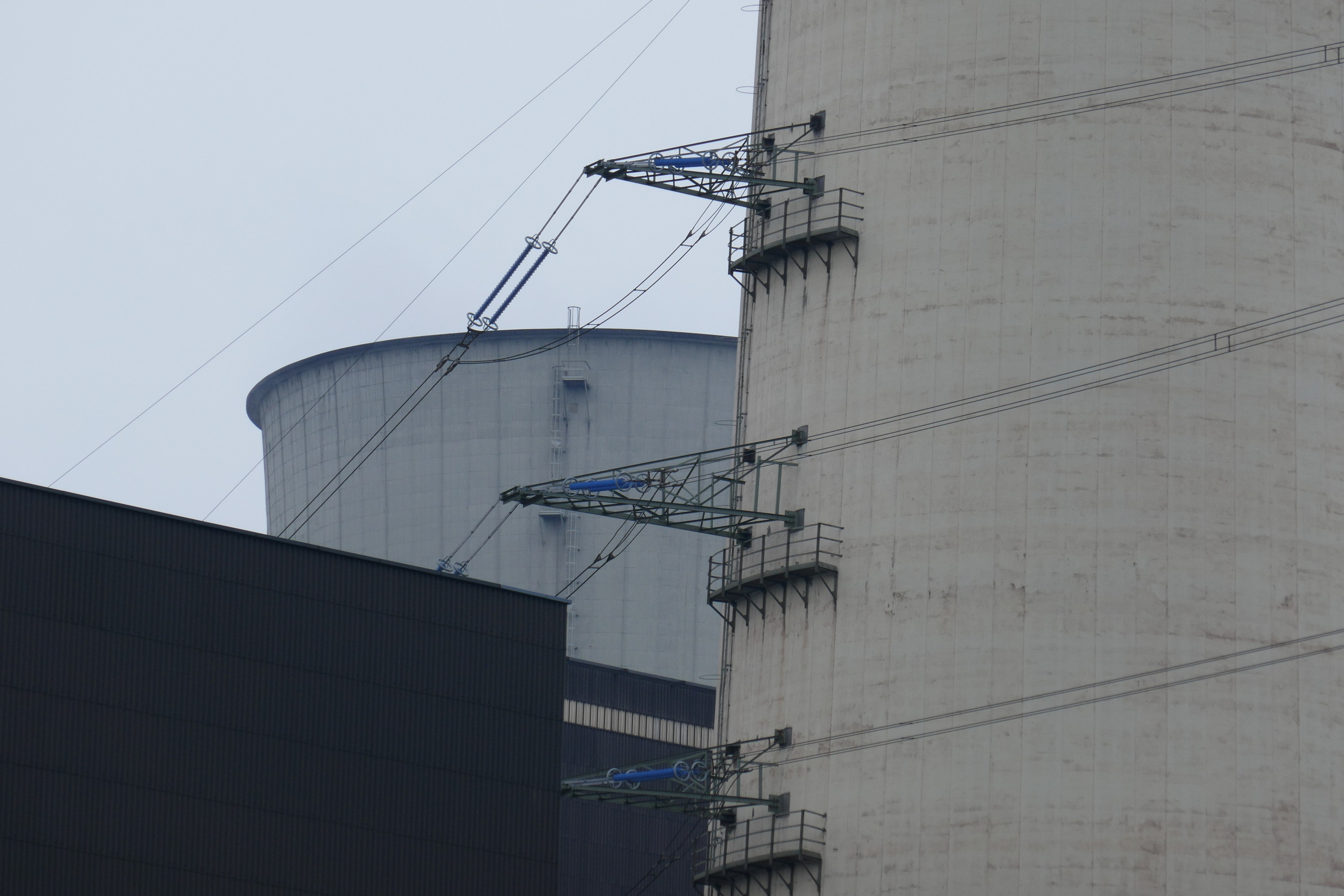
Powerline conductors fixed on crossbars attached to a chimney of Scholven Power Station

At several thermal power stations at least one smokestack is used as electricity pylon. The following possibly incomplete list shows them.

| Country | City | Coordinates | Name | Height | Year of construction | Voltage | Remarks |
|---|---|---|---|---|---|---|---|
| Germany | Gelsenkirchen | 51°36′02″N 7°00′16″E | Scholven Power Station, Chimney for Units B, C, D and E | 300 m | | 220 kV | |
| Belarus | Novolukoml | 54°40′45″N 29°08′09″E | Lukoml Power Station, Chimney 1 | 250 m | 1969 | 330 kV | |
| Belarus | Novolukoml | 54°40′48″N 29°08′07″E | Lukoml Power Station, Chimney 2 | 250 m | 1971 | 330 kV | |
| Belarus | Novolukoml | 54°40′53″N 29°08′04″E | Lukoml Power Station, Chimney 3 | 250 m | 1973 | 330 kV | |
| Lithuania | Elektrenai | 54°46′17″N 24°38′50″E | Elektrėnai Power Plant, Chimney 1 | 150 m | | 330 kV | dismantled |
| Lithuania | Elektrenai | 54°46′12″N 24°38′48″E | Elektrėnai Power Plant, Chimney 2 | 250 m | | 330 kV | dismantled |
| Moldova | Dnestrovsc | 46°37′40″N 29°56′23″E | Cuciurgan power station, Chimney 1 | 180 m | 1964 | 110 kV | |
| Moldova | Dnestrovsc | 46°37′44″N 29°56′23″E | Cuciurgan power station, Chimney 2 | 180 m | 1966 | 330 kV | |
| Moldova | Dnestrovsc | 46°37′49″N 29°56′23″E | Cuciurgan power station, Chimney 3 | 180 m | 1971 | 330 kV | |
| Russia | Archangelsk | 64°34′29″N 40°34′24″E | Archangelsk Cogeneration Plant, Chimney 1 | 170 m | | 220 kV | |
| Russia | Saint Petersburg | 59°58′14″N 30°22′35″E | Vyborgskaya Cogenaration Plant, Chimney 1 | 120 m | | 110 kV | |
| Russia | Tobolsk | 58°14′44″N 68°26′43″E | TEC Tobolsk, Chimney 1 | 240 m | 1980 | 110 kV | |
| Russia | Tobolsk | 58°14′45″N 68°26′55″E | TEC Tobolsk, Chimney 2 | 270 m | 1986 | 220 kV | |
| Russia | Kashira | 54°51′24″N 38°15′23″E | Kashira Power Plant, Chimney 1 | 250 m | 1966 | 220 kV | |
| Russia | Energetik | 51°45′12″N 58°48′09″E | Iriklinskaya Power Station, Chimney 1 | 180 m | | 220 kV | |
| Russia | Energetik | 51°45′12″N 58°48′14″E | Iriklinskaya Power Station, Chimney 2 | 180 m | | 220 kV | |
| Russia | Energetik | 51°45′13″N 58°48′22″E | Iriklinskaya Power Station, Chimney 3 | 250 m | | 500 kV | |
| Russia | Konakovo | 56°44′23″N 36°46′22″E | Konakovo Power Station, Chimney 1 | 180 m | 1964 | 220 kV | |
| Russia | Konakovo | 56°44′26″N 36°46′20″E | Konakovo Power Station, Chimney 2 | 180 m | 1966 | 220 kV | |
| Russia | Koryazhma | 61°18′09″N 47°07′13″E | Chimney 1 of Cogenaration Plant 1 of Kotlas Pulp and Paper Mill | 105 m | 1961 | 220 kV | |
| Ukraine | Burshtyn | 49°12′27″N 24°40′03″E | Burshtyn Power Station, Chimney 1 | 180 m | 1965 | 330 kV | |
| Ukraine | Burshtyn | 49°12′31″N 24°39′57″E | Burshtyn Power Station, Chimney 2 | 250 m | 1966 | 330 kV | |
| Ukraine | Burshtyn | 49°12′34″N 24°39′54″E | Burshtyn Power Station, Chimney 3 | 250 m | 1966 | 330 kV | |
| Ukraine | Trypillia | 50°08′01″N 30°44′52″E | Trypillia Power Station, Chimney 1 | 180 m | 1968 | 330 kV | |
| Ukraine | Trypillia | 50°08′00″N 30°44′44″E | Trypillia Power Station, Chimney 2 | 180 m | 1972 | 330 kV | |

Nearly all of these structures exist in an area which was once part of the Soviet Union. Although this use has the disadvantage that conductor ropes may corrode faster due to the exhaust gases, one can find such structures also sometimes in countries not influenced by the former Soviet Union. An example herefore is one chimney of Scholven Power Plant in Gelsenkirchen, which carries one circuit of an outgoing 220 kV-line.

=== Chimneys used as water tower ===
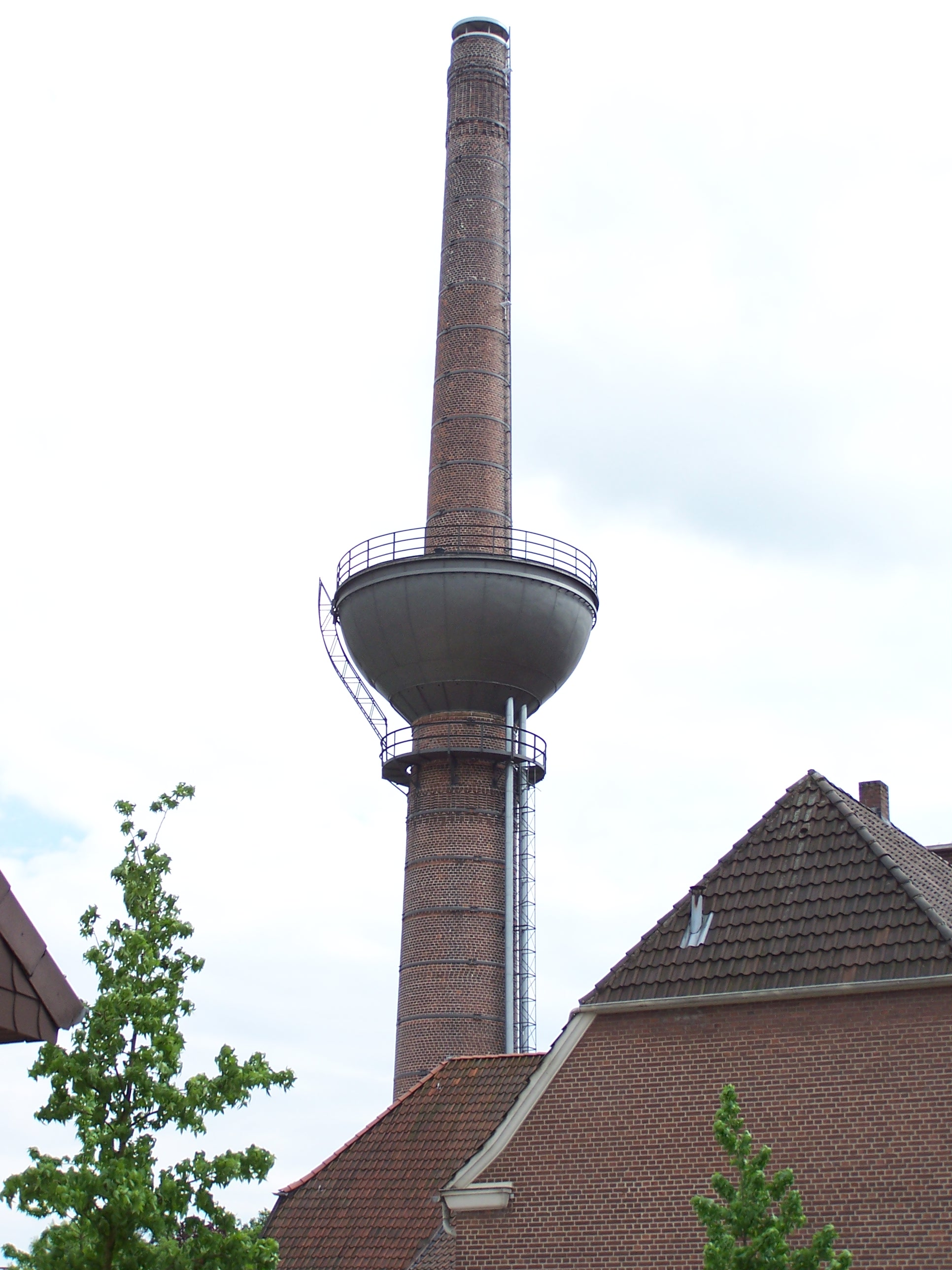
A chimney with water tank in Lengerich, Germany. Most chimneys with water tanks look similar.

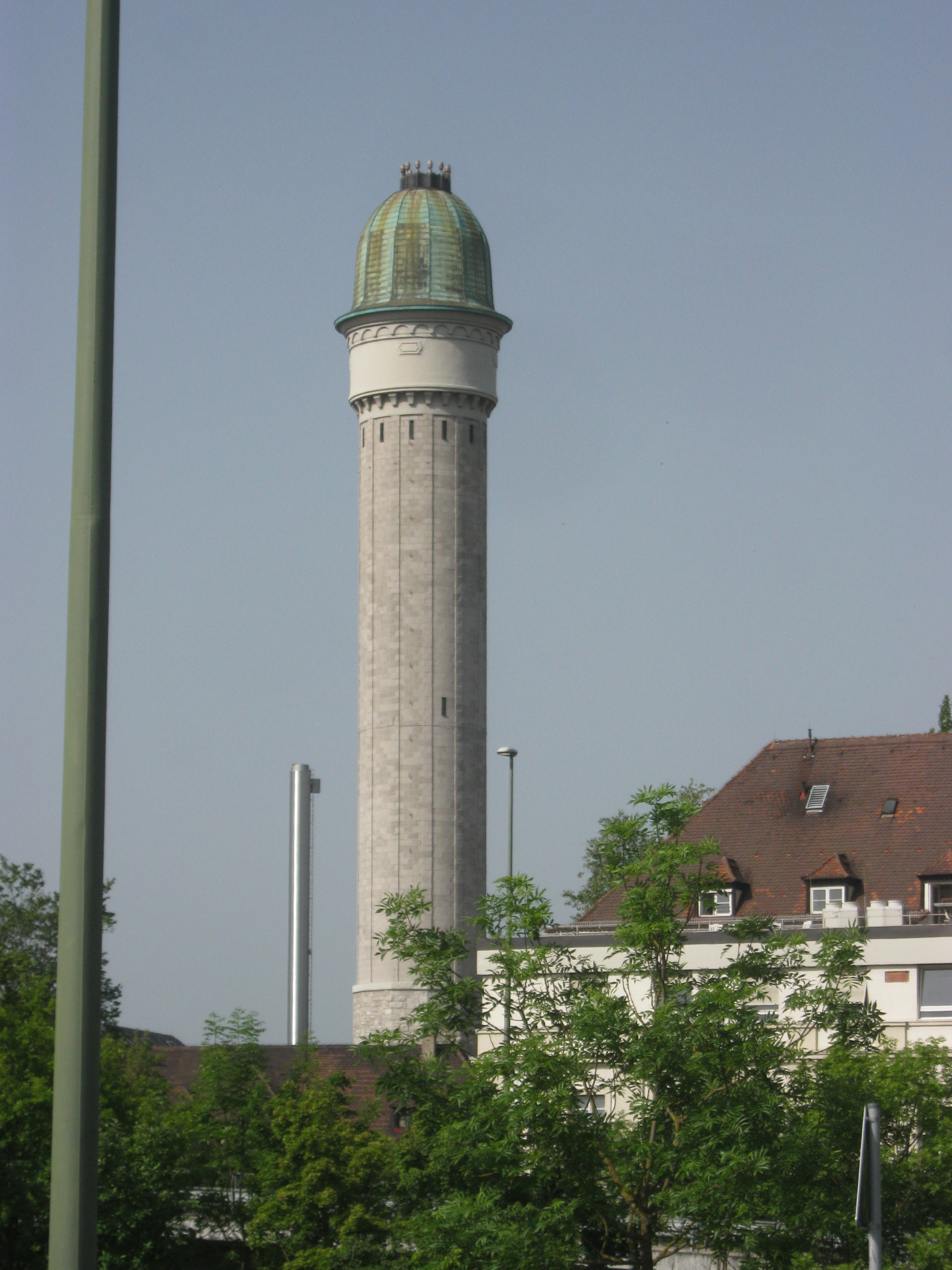
Chimney with water tower at Luitpold hospital in Würzburg, Germany

Chimneys can also carry a water tank on their structure. This combination has the advantage that the warm smoke running through the chimney prevents the water in the tank from freezing. Before World War II such structures were not uncommon, especially in countries influenced by Germany.

=== Chimneys used as radio tower ===
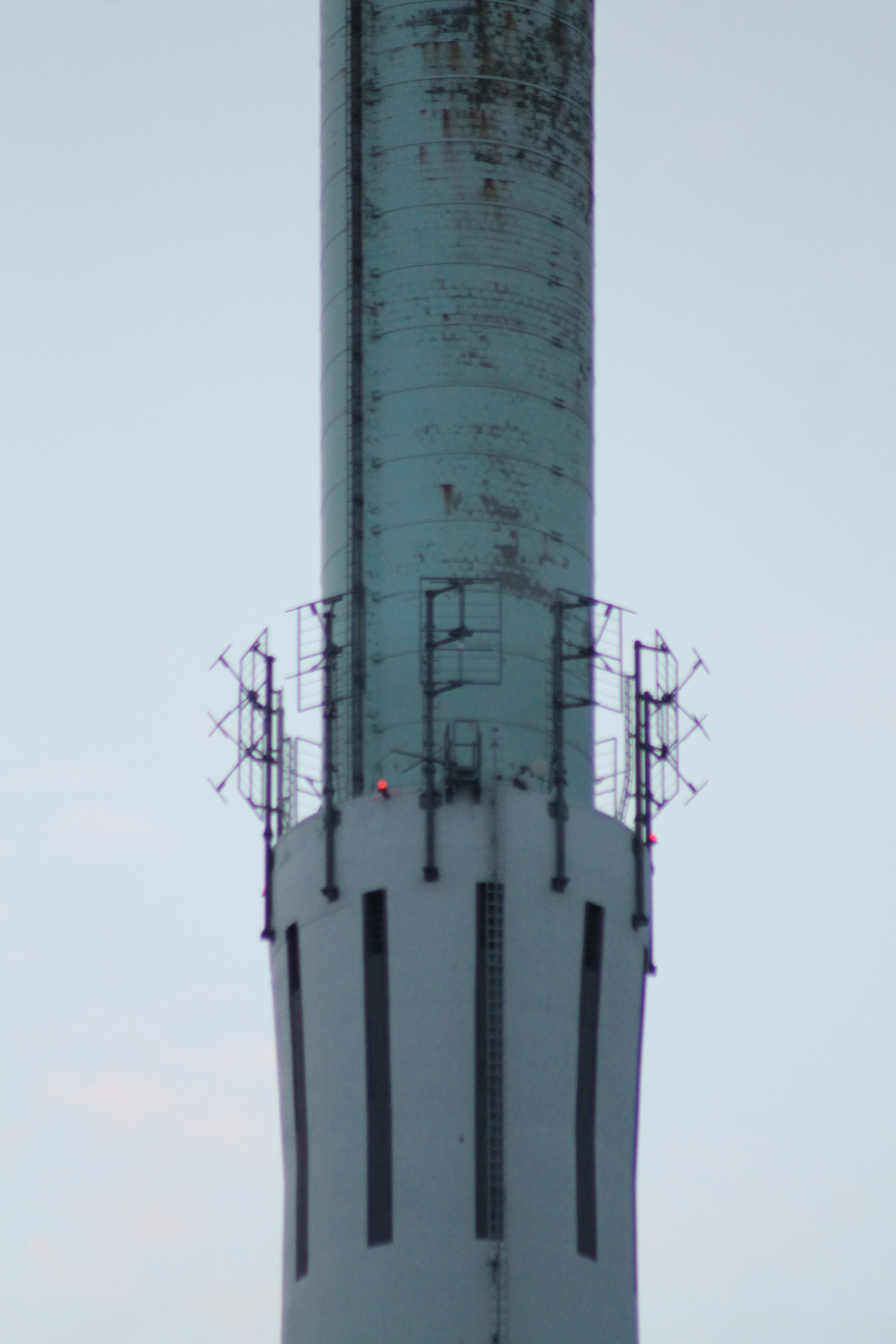
Antennas for FM-broadcasting on the chimney of Stuttgart-Münster power plant

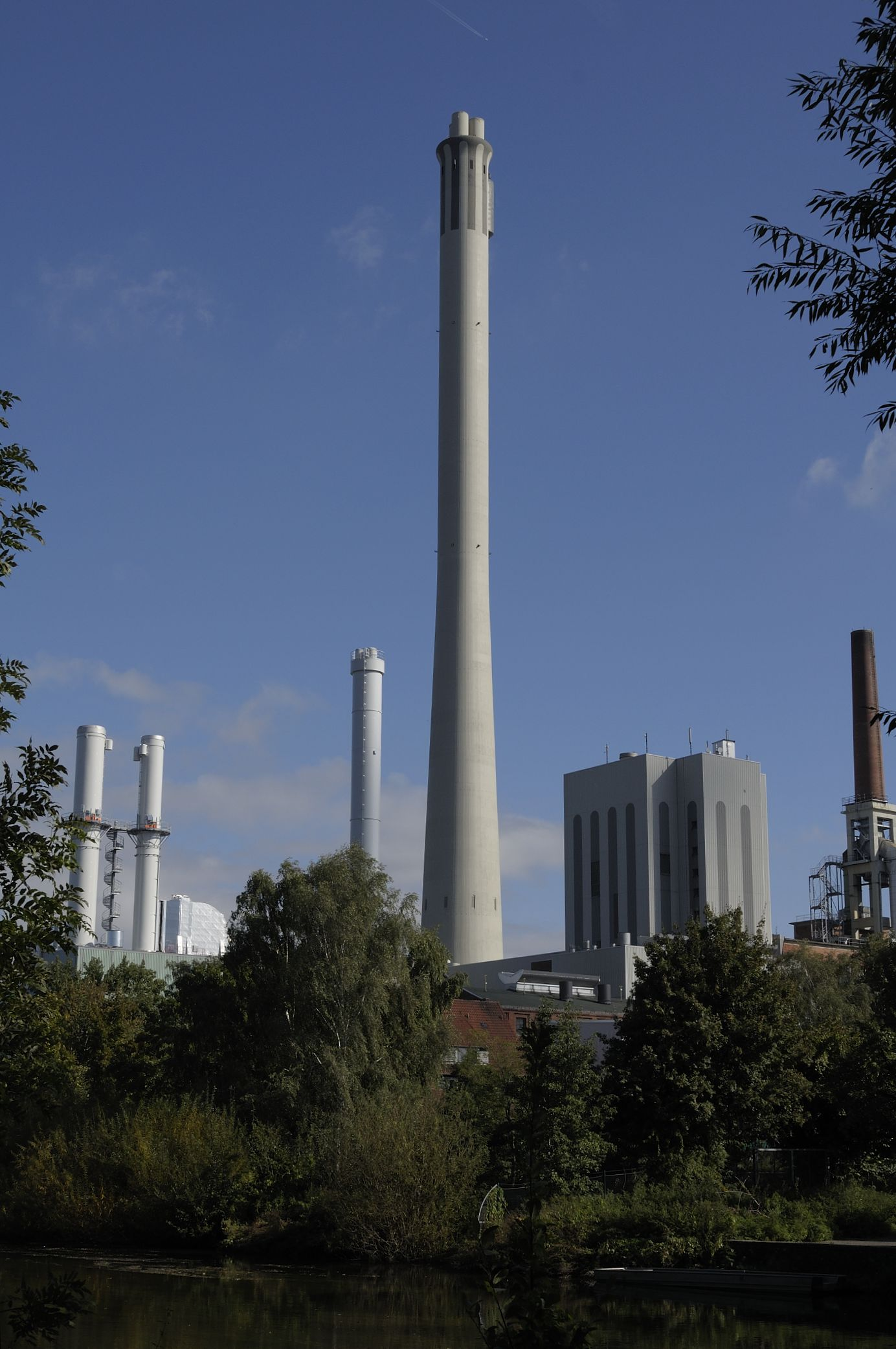
Chimney of Brunswick Central Cogeneration Plant with antennas for TV transmission in the box on the right just below its pinnacle

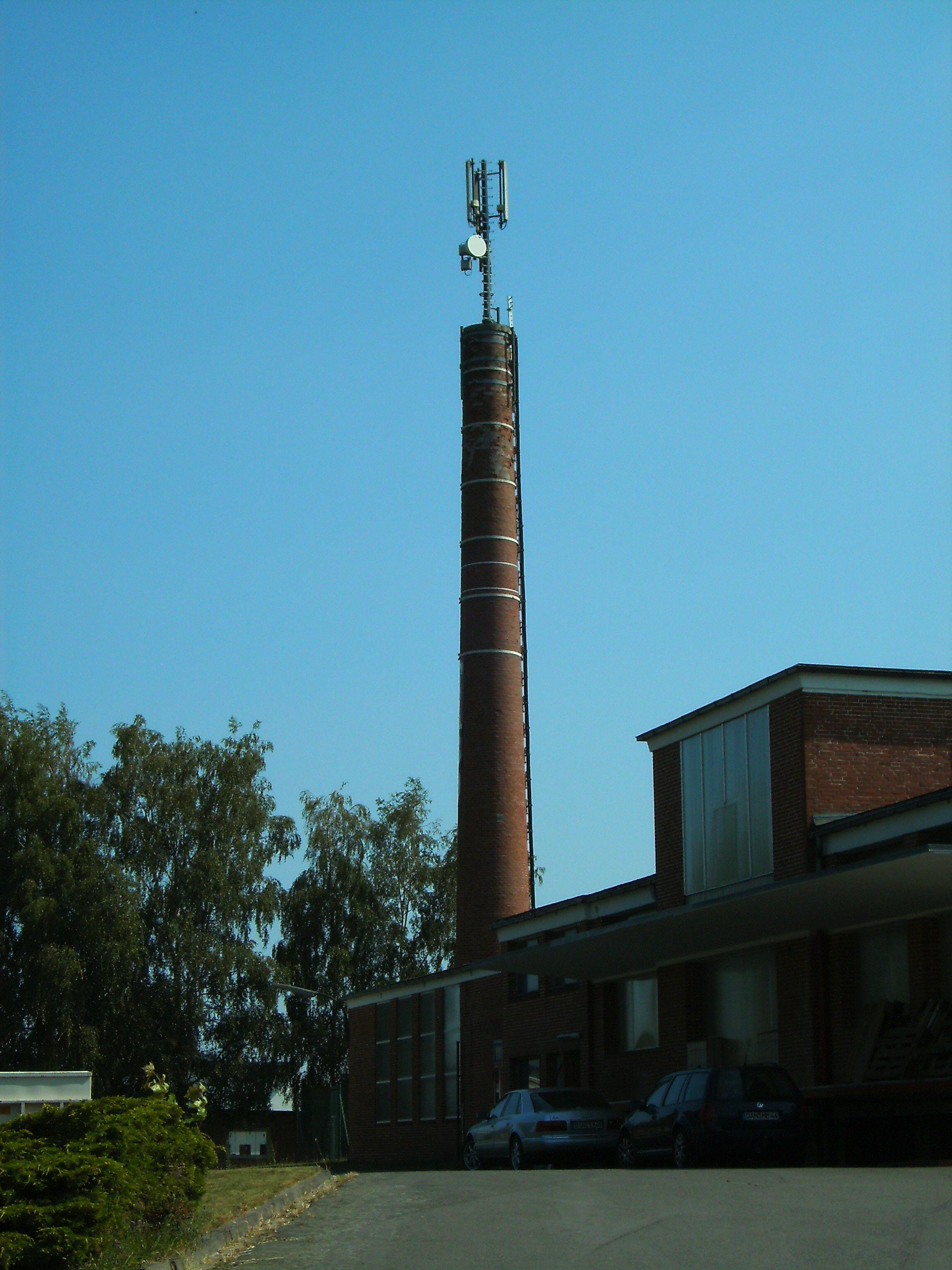
A chimney in Dannenberg converted in a radio tower and not useable as chimney any more.

Chimneys can carry antennas for radio relay services, cell phone transmissions, FM-radio and TV on their structure. Also long wire antennas for mediumwave transmissions can be fixed at chimneys. In all cases it had to be considered that these objects can easily corrode especially when placed near the exhaust. Sometimes chimneys were converted into radio towers and are not useable as ventilation structure any more.

=== Chimneys used for advertising ===
As chimneys are often the tallest part of a factory, they offer the possibility as advertising billboard either by writing the name of the company to which they belong on the shaft or by installing advertisement boards on their structure.

== Cooling tower used as an industrial chimney ==
At some power stations, which are equipped with plants for the removal of sulfur dioxide and nitrogen oxides, it is possible to use the cooling tower as a chimney. Such cooling towers can be seen in Germany at the Großkrotzenburg Power Station and at the Rostock Power Station. At power stations that are not equipped for removing sulfur dioxide, such usage of cooling towers could result in serious corrosion problems which are not easy to prevent.

== See also ==
- Chimenea
- Chimney (locomotive)
- Cowl (chimney) – Includes image of referenced H-style cap/cowl
- Flue-gas stack
- Funnel (ship)
- List of tallest chimneys
- Silos & Smokestacks National Heritage Area
- Solar chimney
