= Venting =

Venting may refer to:

- Venting (album), a 2005 music album by Five.Bolt.Main
- "Venting", a song by Nines from the 2018 Crop Circle (album)
- Gas venting in the hydrocarbon and chemical industries
- Hydrothermal vent
- Venting in Drain-waste-vent system in plumbing
- Venting in Permeability (foundry sand)
- Venting, a form of complaining
- The act of using a vent in the online multiplayer game Among Us

== See also ==
- Vent (disambiguation)
