= Cowl (chimney) =

Hood-shaped covering used to increase the draft of a chimney and prevent backflow

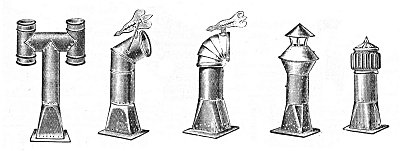
Cowl designs from a 1910 catalogue

A cowl is a usually hood-shaped covering used to increase the draft of a chimney and prevent backflow. The cowl, usually made of galvanized iron, is fitted to the chimney pot to prevent wind blowing the smoke back down into the room below. Undoubtedly named after the resemblance of many designs to the cowl garment worn by monks, they have been in use for centuries.

When using an open fire to heat a room the smoke rises through a flue to a chimney pot on the roof. Under normal conditions the warm air from the fire will rise up the chimney emitting the smoke with it and dispersing it at rooftop level where it is less of a nuisance.

In strong winds the pressure of the wind may overwhelm the updraft and push the airflow in reverse down the flue. Smoke will then fill the room it is intended to heat posing a health and fire risk, causing discomfort and dirtying furnishings in its path.

When raw coal rather than smokeless fuel is burnt, the amount of smoke may be considerable and measures to prevent backflow occurring are a necessity.

A secondary function is to prevent birds and squirrels from nesting in the chimney. Cowls often also act as a rain guard to keep rain from going down the chimney. A metal wire mesh is sometimes added as a spark arrestor. Wooden cowls were used on oasts to prevent the ingress of rain into kilns, and create a flow of air through the kiln.

An H-style cap (cowl) is a chimney top constructed from chimney pipes shaped like the letter H. It is an age-old method to regulate draft in situations where prevailing winds or turbulence cause downdraft and back-puffing. Although the H-cap has a distinctive advantage over most other downdraft caps, it fell out of favor because of its bulky looks. It is found mainly in marine use but has been gaining popularity again for its energy saving functionality. The H-cap stabilizes the draft rather than increasing it. Other downdraft caps are based on the Venturi effect, solving downdraft problems by increasing the updraft constantly resulting in much higher fuel consumption.

== Examples ==
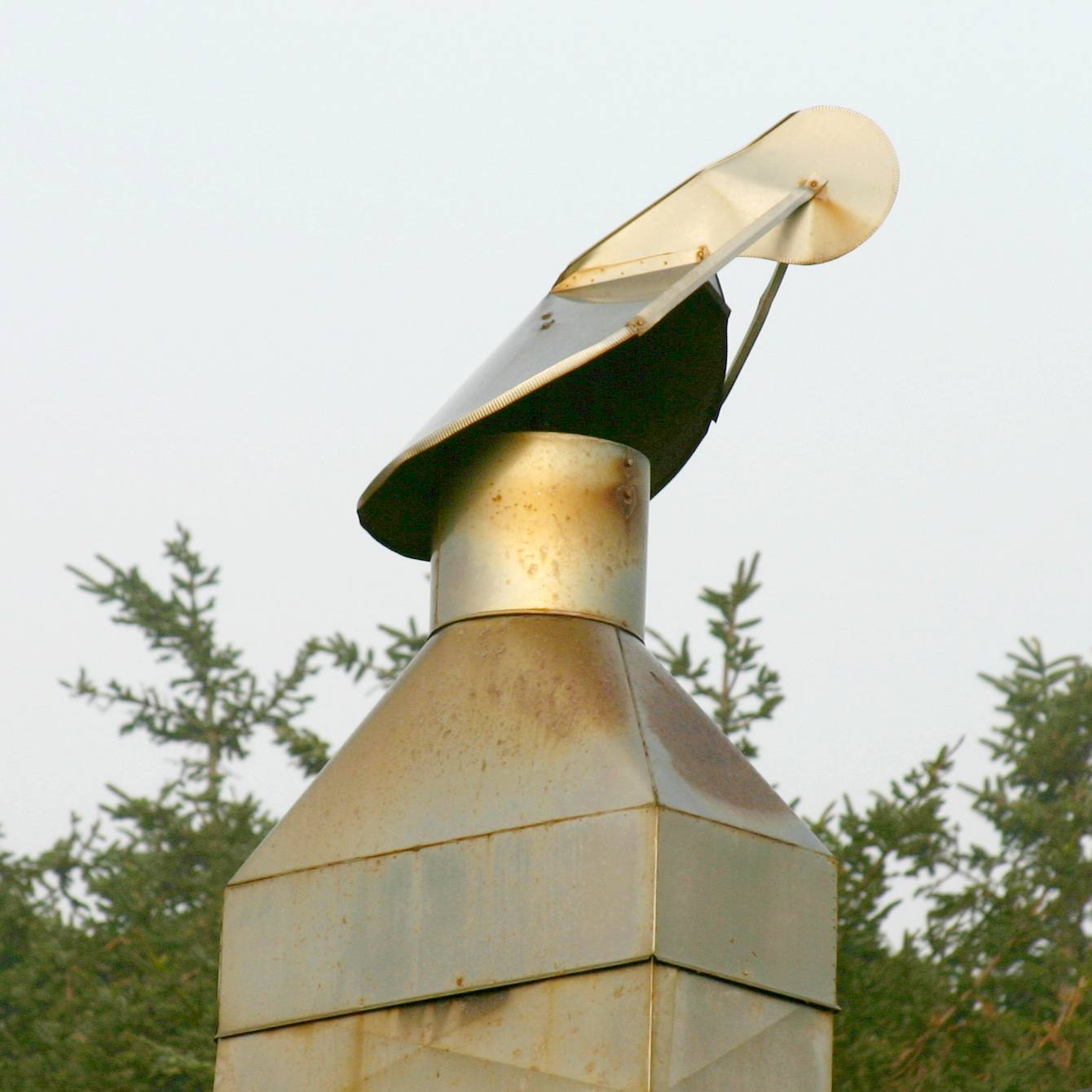
Wind directional cowl found on many homes along the windy Oregon coast, USA.

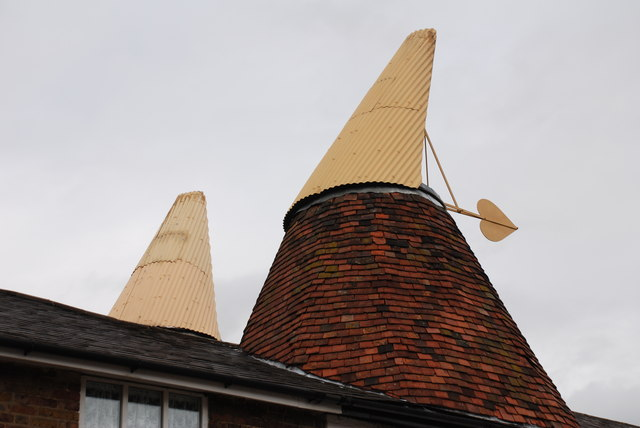
An oast cowl

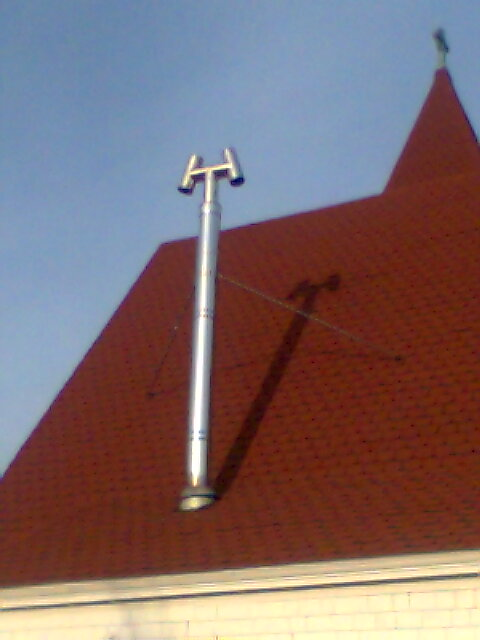
A H-style cowl

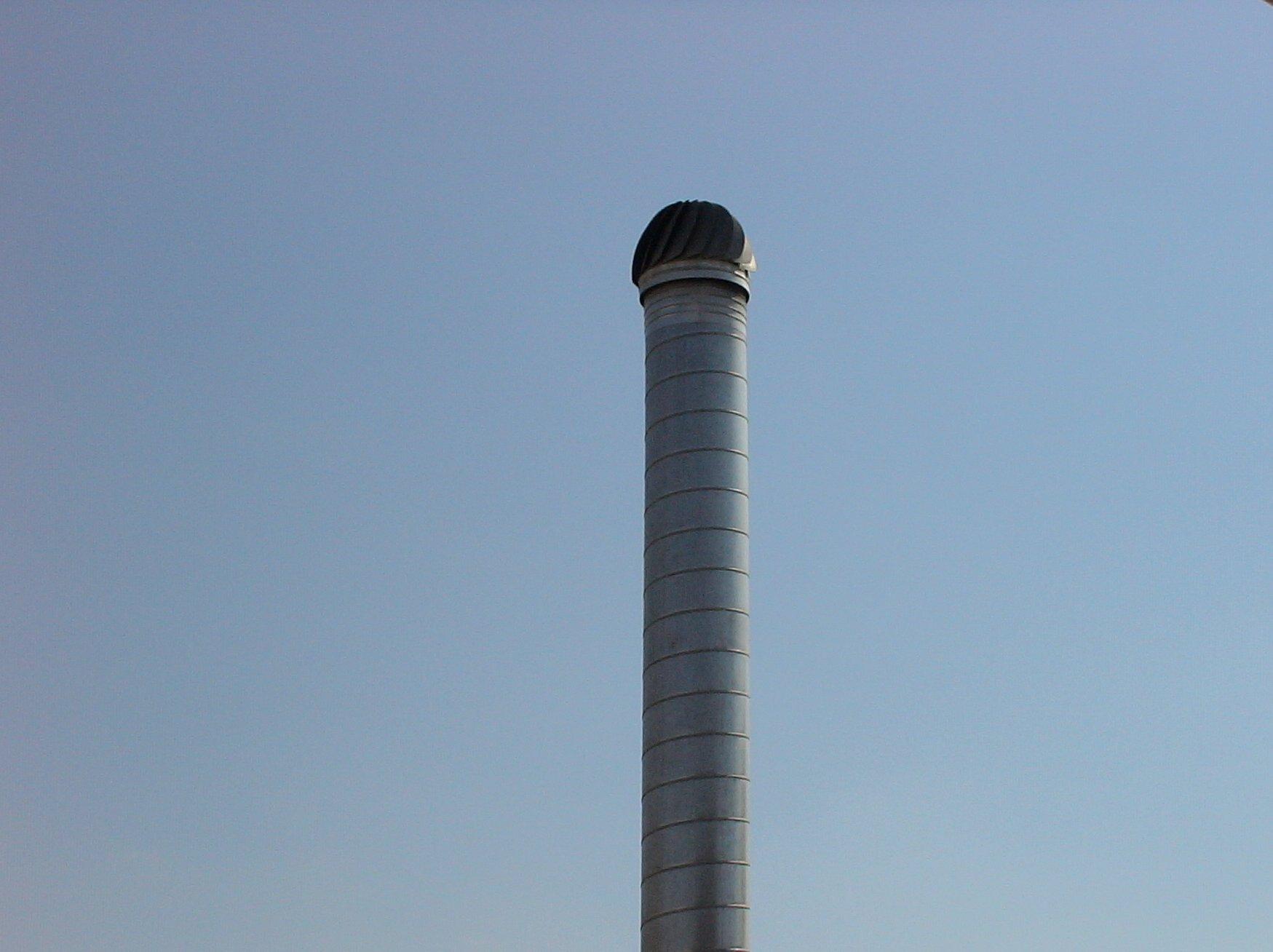
Wind-rolling home cowl

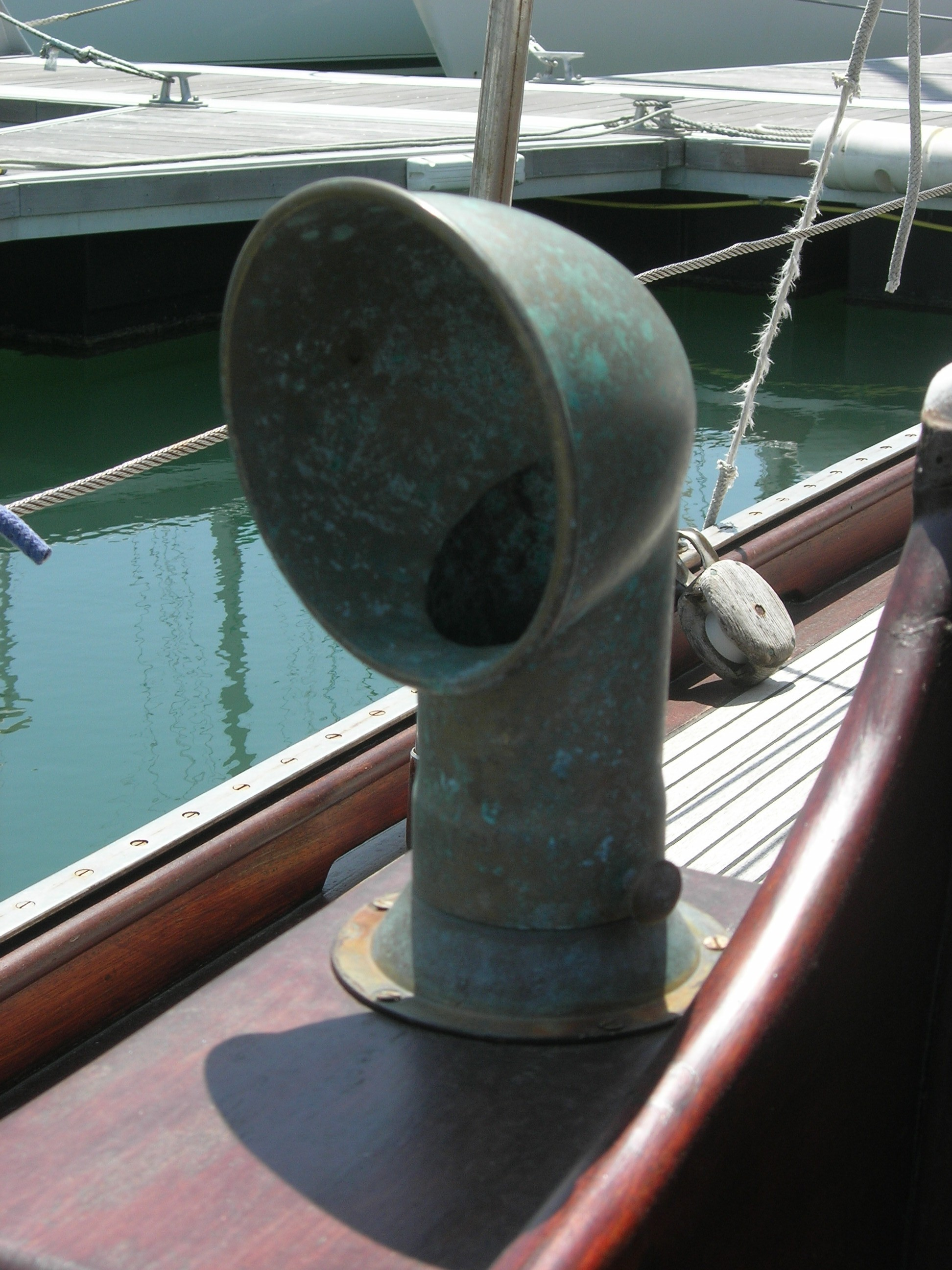
Boat's ventilator cowl

Cowls are also used where flues are no longer in use and therefore need to be capped off for protection against ingress of precipitation and nesting birds. Such cowls are designed to afford protection to the flue while still allowing a degree of ventilation.

== See also ==
- Chimney
