= Rostock Power Station =

Coal-fired power station in Germany

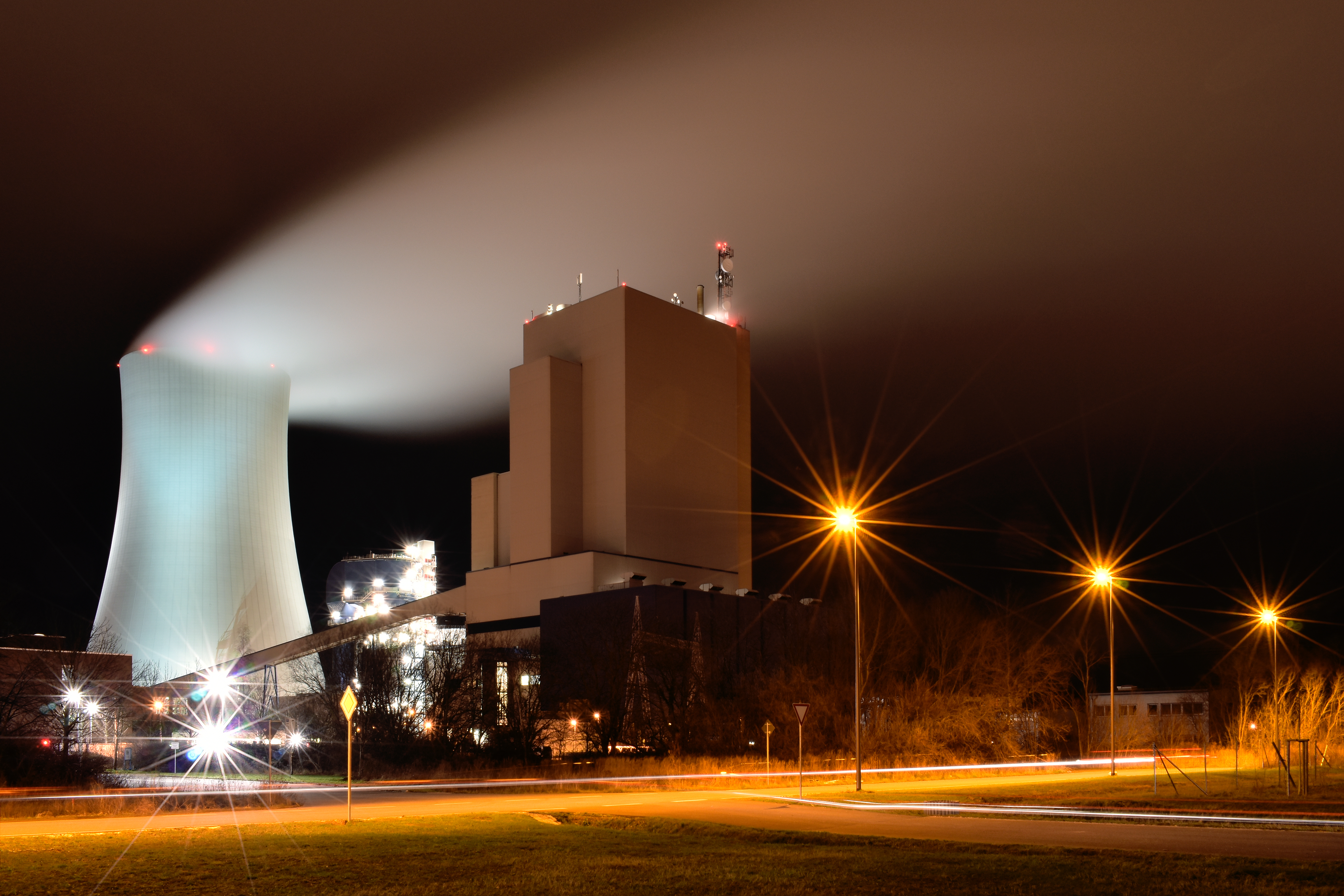
- Country: Germany
- Location: Rostock
- Coordinates: 54°08′29″N 12°07′55″E
- Commission date: 1994
- Owners: EnBW (50,4 %); Rheinenergie (49,6 %)

Thermal power station
- Primary fuel: Bituminous coal
- Cogeneration?: Yes

Power generation
- Nameplate capacity: 553 MW

External links
- Commons: Related media on Commons

Rostock Power Station is a bituminous coal-fired combined heat and power plant operated by Kraftwerks- und Netzgesellschaft mbH (KNG), located in Rostock, Germany. Construction on the plant began in June 1991, and test firing and grid connection were carried out from March to September, 1994. In October of that year it entered normal service.

In addition to a generating capacity of 553 MWe, the station also feeds the Rostock district heating net. A notable feature of the Rostock Power Station is that the 160-metre-tall (520 ft) cooling tower also serves as chimney.
