= Ventilation =

Ventilation may refer to:

- Ventilation (physiology), the movement of air between the environment and the lungs via inhalation and exhalation
  - Mechanical ventilation, in medicine, using artificial methods to assist breathing
    - Respirator, a machine designed to move breathable air into and out of the lungs
- Ventilation (architecture), the process of "changing" or replacing air in any space to provide high indoor air quality
- Ventilation (firefighting), the expulsion of heat and smoke from a fire building
- Ventilation (mining), flow of air to the underground workings of a mine of sufficient volume to dilute and remove noxious gases

== See also ==
- Heat recovery ventilation
- Heating, ventilation, and air conditioning, the technology of indoor and vehicular environmental comfort
- Mechanical fan
- Reebok Ventilator, a shoe
- Ventilation shutdown, a method of mass killing farm animals
- Vent (disambiguation)
- Ventilator (disambiguation)
