= Ventilator (disambiguation) =

A ventilator, in medical terminology, is a machine designed to provide mechanical ventilation by moving breathable air into and out of the lungs.

Ventilator may also refer to:

- Ventilator (2016 film), a Marathi film
- Ventilator (2018 film), a Gujarati film
- Ventilator-associated pneumonia, a type of lung infection that occurs in people who are on mechanical ventilation
- Ventilator-associated lung injury, an acute lung injury that develops during mechanical ventilation
- Ventilator Blues, a song by English rock band The Rolling Stones
- Ventilator 202, a live radio show
- Ventilatory system, a biological system consisting of specific organs and structures
- Reebok Ventilator, a line of athletic shoes
- Fan (machine), a non-medical device to create airflow, e.g. for cooling or climate control

== See also ==
- Ventilation (disambiguation)
