= Smokestack industry =

Pollution-generating basic industry

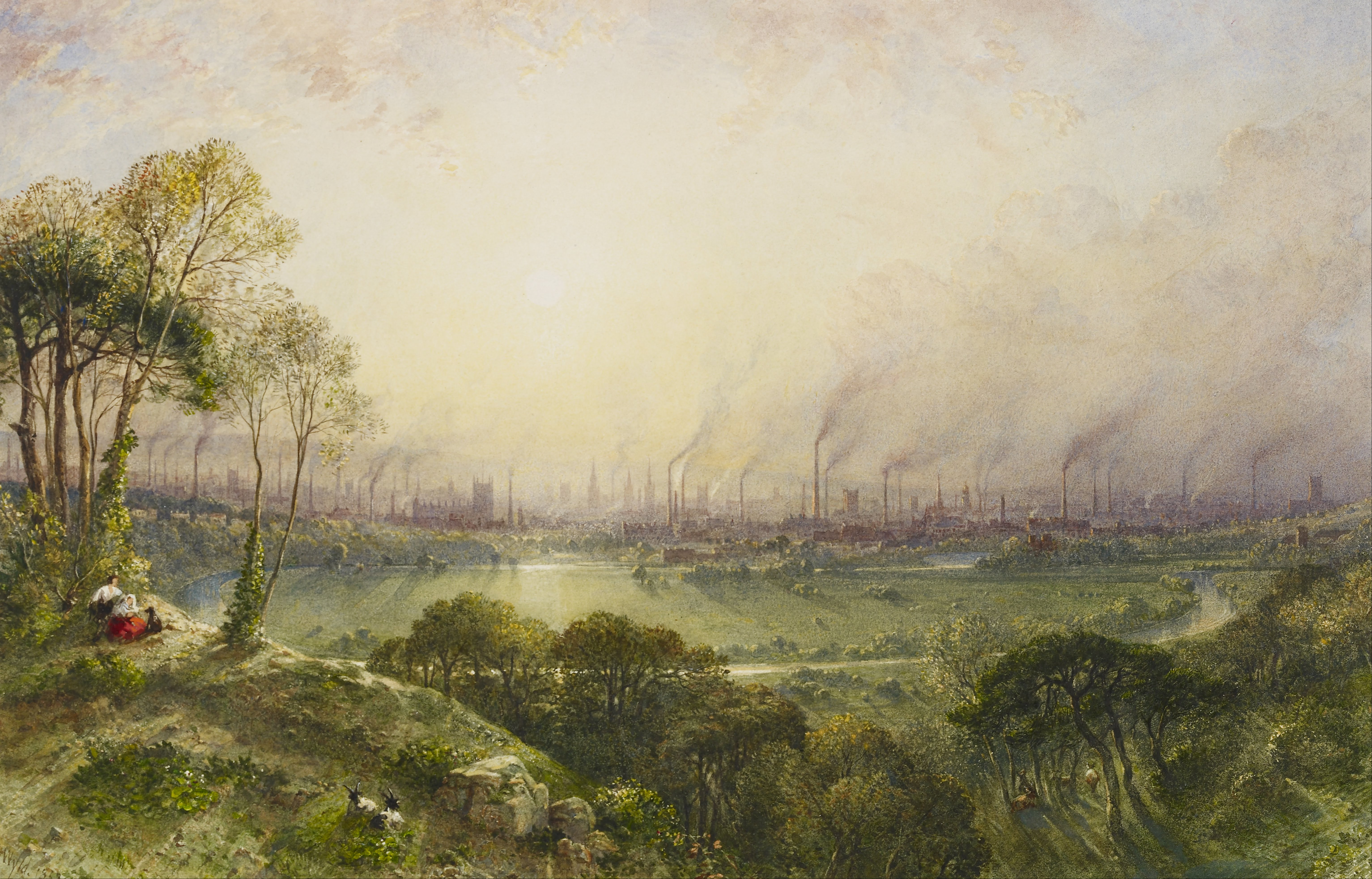
Smokestacks in Manchester England c. 1858 watercolor by William Wyld.

A smokestack industry is a basic, usually cyclical, heavy industry. The factories stereotypically used in such industries have smoke stacks, hence the name, and produce a high volume of pollution.

Example industries include:

- Iron and steelworks
- Automotive
- Chemical
- Power generation

== History ==
Smokestacks were first used during Industrial Revolution between the 18th and 19th centuries and were known to foul the airs in most larger cities but were most noted in large industrial centers like Manchester England or Pittsburgh Pennsylvania. During the dramatic growth and evolution of systems used to produce electricity coal burning central electric stations that relied on direct current were found throughout cities that released noxious fumes and soot into the city air. Taller smokestacks helped to reduce this environmental issue.
