= Vent DNA polymerase =

DNA polymerase

Identifiers
- Organism: Thermococcus litorali
- Symbol: pol
- UniProt: P30317
Search for
- Structures: Swiss-model
- Domains: InterPro

Vent polymerase is a archean thermostable DNA polymerase used for the polymerase chain reaction. It was isolated from the thermophile Thermococcus litoralis.
