= Flue =

Exhaust for a fireplace, furnace etc

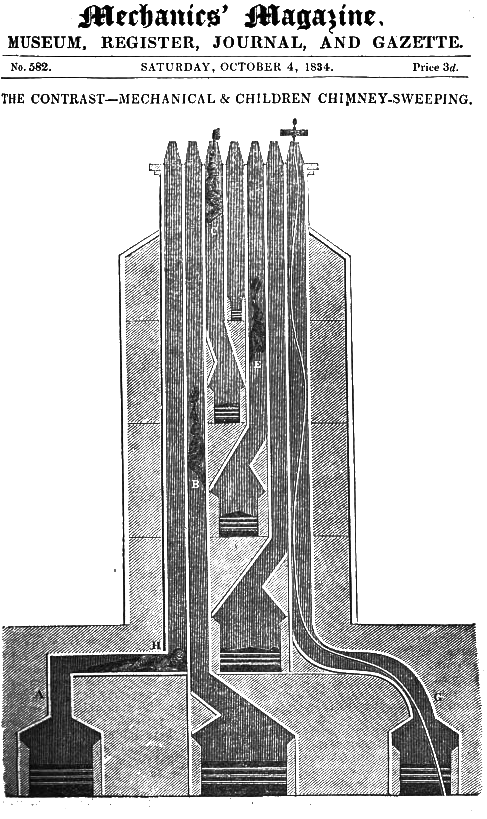
A seven-flue chimney in a four-story Georgian house in London, showing alternative methods of sweeping

A flue is a pipe, or opening in a chimney for conveying exhaust gases from a fireplace, furnace, water heater, boiler, or generator to the outdoors. Historically the term flue meant the chimney itself. In the United States, they are also known as vents for boilers and as breeching for water heaters and modern furnaces. They usually operate by buoyancy, also known as the stack effect, or the combustion products may be "induced" via a blower. As combustion products contain carbon monoxide and other dangerous compounds, proper "draft", and admission of replacement air is imperative. Building codes, and other standards, regulate their materials, design, and installation.

A flue is the passage within a chimney or within an appliance (appliance flue) that conveys products of combustion to the outdoor atmosphere. In U.S. model codes, the regulated venting system is the continuous open passageway from the appliance’s flue collar or draft hood to outdoors, typically consisting of a vent or chimney and any vent connector; HVAC ductwork is not part of, and may not be used as, a venting system. Appliances generally discharge combustion products to the outdoors; venting may occur by natural draft (buoyancy) or by mechanical draft (fan-assisted), and direct-vent appliances are sealed-combustion units that take all combustion air from outdoors and discharge outdoors. Acceptable venting materials and terminations are prescribed by code and by the appliance/vent listing—for example, Type B gas vent for many Category I appliances, and listed special gas vent systems (e.g., systems listed to UL 1738) where positive pressure or condensate is expected—with installation following both the fuel-gas code and the manufacturer’s instructions.

== Heat retention ==
Flues are adjustable and are designed to release noxious gases to the atmosphere. They often have the disadvantageous effect of releasing useful household heat to the atmosphere when not properly set—the very opposite of why the fire was lit in the first place.

Fireplaces are one of the biggest energy wasters when the flue is not used properly. This occurs when the flue is left open too wide after the fire is started. Known as convection, warm air from the house is pulled up the chimney, while cold air from outside is pulled into the house wherever it can enter, including around leaking windows and doors. Ideally, the flue should be open all the way when the fire is first started, and then adjusted toward closure as the fire burns until it is open just enough to slowly pull smoke from the fire up the chimney. After the flue heats up from the fire, they are easier to move, but also hotter. Hands should be protected when operating the flue lever; and if a new log is added to the fire, the flue must be adjusted again to ensure that smoke does not billow out into the house.

In some countries, wood fire flues are often built into a heat preserving construction within which the flue gases circulate over heat retaining bricks before release to the atmosphere. The heat retaining bricks are covered in a decorative material such as brick, tiles or stone. This flue gas circulation avoids the considerable heat loss to the chimney and outside air in conventional systems. The heat from the flue gases is absorbed quickly by the bricks and then released slowly to the house rather than the chimney. In a well insulated home, a single load fire burning for one and a half hours twice a day is enough to keep an entire home warm for a 24-hour period. In this way, less fuel is used, and noxious emissions are reduced. Sometimes, the flue incorporates a second combustion chamber where combustibles in the flue gas are burnt a second time, reducing soot, noxious emissions and increasing overall efficiency.

== Other uses ==
=== Organs ===
The term flue is also used to define certain pipe organ pipes, or rather, their construction or style.

=== Bath-houses ===
Roman thermae constructed centuries ago had flues.

=== Boilers ===
Another use of the term is for the internal flues of a flued boiler.

== Natural-draft venting (United States) ==
In U.S. model codes, a natural-draft venting system is a venting system that removes flue gases entirely by buoyancy (stack effect) under nonpositive static pressure, without mechanical fans. Natural-draft venting is typical of many Category I gas appliances (for example, draft-hood–equipped furnaces and atmospheric water heaters); appliance “Category” refers to expected condensate and vent pressure characteristics and governs permitted vent materials, but is not itself a “type of flue.”

=== Materials and systems ===
Natural-draft appliances are vented by listed systems such as lined masonry chimneys, Type B gas vents, or other materials allowed by the fuel gas code and the appliance listing. Vent connectors join the appliance outlet to the vent or chimney; they are part of the venting system and are distinct from HVAC ductwork.

Sizing. The fuel gas code provides prescriptive sizing for natural-draft venting systems serving one or more listed appliances (including draft-hood and fan-assisted Category I units listed for Type B vent). Correct sizing depends on total input, connector and vent height, lateral length, and other factors.

=== Installation basics ===
Vent connectors for natural-draft appliances must:

- Rise to the vent or chimney with a minimum upward slope of **1/4 inch per foot** (2%); avoid dips and sags.
- Observe maximum horizontal lengths and required clearances to combustibles per code and listing (e.g., single-wall connector max length typically 75% of chimney/vent height, unless engineered).
- Use listed/insulated materials where required (e.g., in unconditioned spaces).
- Not connect to any portion of a mechanical-draft system operating under positive pressure.

=== Combustion and dilution air ===
Natural-draft appliances depend on adequate combustion/dilution air. The fuel gas code sets methods for providing indoor or outdoor combustion air and addresses mechanical air supply when used. Because of the potential for spillage, placement in sleeping rooms and bathrooms is generally prohibited unless exceptions (such as direct-vent, sealed-combustion appliances) apply.

== Mechanical-draft venting (United States) ==
In U.S. model codes, a mechanical-draft venting system removes flue or vent gases by mechanical means and consists of either an induced-draft portion operating under nonpositive static pressure or a forced-draft portion operating under positive static pressure. Direct-vent appliances (sealed combustion) are defined separately; they take all combustion air from outdoors and discharge outdoors, and are installed per their listings and instructions.

=== Design and pressure ===
Portions of a venting system operating under positive pressure (forced-draft and any positive sections of induced-draft systems) must be designed and installed to prevent leakage of combustion products into the building. Vent connectors serving appliances vented by natural draft are not permitted to connect to any portion of a mechanical-draft system operating under positive pressure.

=== Termination and clearances ===
Through-the-wall direct-vent and non-direct-vent terminals must comply with the clearances in IFGC Table 503.8 and Figure 503.8 (e.g., mechanical-draft terminations at least 3 ft above any forced-air inlet within 10 ft, with listed exceptions).

=== Materials and listing ===
Mechanical-draft appliances commonly use listed special gas vents (including metallic systems listed to UL 1738 for positive-pressure/condensing categories) or other materials specifically identified in the appliance listing. Where plastic piping is used, the appliance must be listed for that venting material and the installation must follow the appliance and vent-system manufacturer’s instructions; plastic venting systems listed and labeled to UL 1738 must be installed per the vent manufacturer’s instructions. Trade guidance reflecting these code provisions emphasizes that (1) primer is required where specified and must be of contrasting color, (2) high-temperature polypropylene and stainless systems are often required for elevated flue-gas temperatures, and (3) components from different vent manufacturers must not be intermixed.

=== Sizing and engineering ===
Mechanical-draft chimney/vent sizing follows the code, listings, or engineering methods as applicable; where chimney venting uses mechanical draft, sizing by engineering methods is expressly required by adoptions based on the IFGC.

== Direct-vent appliances (United States) ==
In U.S. model codes, a direct-vent appliance is constructed and installed so that all combustion air is taken directly from outdoors and all flue gases are discharged outdoors; the combustion system is sealed from the room. Listed direct-vent appliances are installed in accordance with the manufacturer’s instructions and the fuel gas code.

=== Locations ===
Because they do not draw combustion air from the room, direct-vent gas appliances are typically permitted as exceptions to the general prohibition on locating fuel-fired appliances in sleeping rooms and bathrooms, when installed per their listing.

=== Termination clearances ===
Through-the-wall terminals for direct-vent and non-direct-vent systems must meet the clearances in IFGC §503.8 (table/figure), such as required separation from doors, windows, and air inlets; local adoptions often specify a minimum of 12 in. above finished grade for the vent terminal and air intake.

=== Materials and listing ===
Direct-vent appliances commonly fall under Categories II/III/IV for venting and use listed special gas vents (metallic or polymeric). Where plastic piping is used, the appliance must be listed for that venting material; plastic vent systems either follow the appliance-specified product standards or are listed and labeled to UL 1738 (USA) and installed per the vent manufacturer’s instructions (including requirements such as contrasting-color primer where applicable). Mixing components from different vent manufacturers is not permitted in UL-1738 systems.

=== Practice notes (trade/education) ===
RMGA’s code-driven guidance aligns with the model codes: (1) both pipes (combustion air and exhaust) must be installed and terminate outdoors to qualify as direct-vent; (2) manufacturer instructions/listings govern materials (e.g., UL-1738-listed polypropylene or stainless systems, or manufacturer-specified CPVC/PVC systems); and (3) direct-vent appliances are excluded from room-volume combustion-air calculations because they do not rely on indoor air.

== See also ==
- Flue gas stack
- Combustion
- Masonry heater
