= Reebok Zig =

Footwear technology

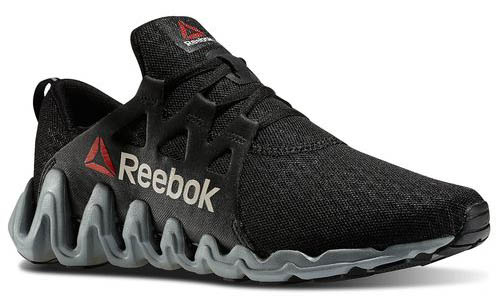
- ZigTech Big & Quick
- Product type: Sneakers
- Current owner: Reebok
- Country: United States
- Introduced: 2010; 16 years ago
- Markets: Worldwide
- Ambassador: John Wall
- Website: reebok.com/zig

Reebok Zig is an athletic footwear technology and collection of shoes designed by Reebok. ZigTech debuted in January 2010 and was first introduced with the ZigPulse later that year. ZigTech includes a zigzag foam sole that is designed to push athletes forward. The design assists in energy return to the wearer by absorbing impact at the heel and dispersing the energy through the zigzag composition which propels the athlete forward and also reduces stress on the shins. Reebok has released various styles of ZigTech designs that are compatible across a variety of sports.

== Product history ==
The first shoe debuted with the Reebok ZigTech design was the ZigPulse, which was released in March 2010 in six colorways. The shoe was lightweight, flexible and made for runners and athletes. In June 2010, Reebok announced the release of Zig Slash. ZigSlash was designed as the signature shoe of professional basketball player John Wall, the 2010 NBA draft first pick and point guard for the Washington Wizards.

== Styles ==
Reebok has released other collections and styles with the brand's Zig technology since the two introductory styles in 2010. In Spring 2011, Reebok debuted the next ZigTech shoe, the ZigTech Nano Fly. The shoes were designed as a lower-profile version of the original lightweight running shoe. Later in 2011, the brand introduced ZigWild TR running shoes that were modified with spikes placed between the "zigs" on the sole, along with a reinforced nylon upper. The shoes were released in six colorways and designed to create more traction for trail running.

In 2012, the ZigLite Run shoes debuted as a more flexible, better-cushioned running shoe with Zig 2.0 technology. The shoes were originally released in NHL inspired colorways and later in neutral tones. ZigTech Sharks were also introduced in 2012. The shoes had redesigned zigzag soles with 20-degree backward angles that resembled shark teeth. ZigKicks were also released and had an arched soles to improve stride.

The Zig Carbon shoes debuted in 2013 reinforced with a carbon plate running from the heel to the ball of the foot. The following year, ZigTech Big 'N Fast high-performance running shoes were introduced.

== Endorsements ==
ZigTech was introduced in 27 markets with a marketing campaign featuring athletes such as NFL quarterback Peyton Manning, Indian cricketers Yuvraj Singh and Mahendra Singh Dhoni, and British boxer Amir Khan.

NBA point guard John Wall signed with Reebok in 2010 for $25 million and collaborated with the brand to produce the ZigSlash and ZigEncore. ZigTech shoes were also endorsed by hockey player Sidney Crosby and NFL player Chad Ochocinco.

In 2010 Reebok outfitted the cast of Jersey Shore with ZigTech shoes. In early 2011, Erin Andrews endorsed ZigTech shoes. She was the first female featured in the brand's campaign for the collection.

== See also ==
- Reebok
- Reebok Classic
- Reebok Pump
- Reebok Ventilator
