= LA Gear =

American shoe company based in California

- Type: Subsidiary
- Industry: Textile, footwear
- Founded: 1983; 43 years ago
- Founder: Robert Greenberg
- Headquarters: Los Angeles
- Products: Shoes, sneakers, clothing
- Parent: Frasers Group
- Website: lagear.com

LA Gear (or L.A. Gear) is an American shoe company based in Los Angeles. Founded in 1983, it is part of Frasers Group brands.

== History ==
LA Gear was started by Robert Greenberg, Ernest Williams, and Stephen Williams. Greenberg had moved to Los Angeles from his native Boston in 1978, where he picked up the Hang 10 license for shoe skates. Once he realized that it was the “uppers” that held the most promise for sales, Greenberg began focusing on shoes instead of skates, leading to the birth of the LA Gear brand in 1983. He targeted the women's athletic shoe market, with an appeal to fashion and selection over technical features. The company went public in 1986.

As the 1990s began, company sales reached $818.8 million, and LA Gear was third in athletic shoe sales behind Nike and Reebok. Although its original lines were typically featured in high-end department stores, LA Gear shoes became easier to find in discount retailers. Caldor began carrying LA Gear shoes designed specifically for the store and its clientele.

Trouble began to appear for LA Gear in 1992. As its stock sunk from $50 to $10 a share, Robert Greenberg stepped down as CEO; within the year he founded the shoe company Skechers, which he still manages as of 2022. By 1993 LA Gear's popularity was beginning to wane. Within a year the company began restricting access to the shoes, returning to higher-end department stores to gain a more upscale clientele. However, in doing so the company was so desperate to sell the remaining inventory that LA Gear shoes began showing up at flea markets, swap meets, and supermarkets.

In 1994, LA Gear abandoned its men's performance footwear line and began marketing the lifestyle brands for women and children more aggressively. They also tried to acquire the struggling Rykä brand of women's shoes, but the deal failed. In 1995 Walmart and LA Gear signed a three-year contract to design lower-value and specific-to-store shoes for Walmart, but the venture failed as sales for LA Gear shoes at Walmart had declined. The company filed for Chapter 11 bankruptcy in 1998, in the process greatly reducing the lines of shoes it was selling. Since the bankruptcy filing LA Gear has made three concerted attempts at coming back. The first was in 1999, with an emphasis on casual shoes for men and women and the return of the popular LA Lights line for children. The company's largest initial licensee was LA-based footwear manufacturer ACI International, which also bought a majority stake. However, the brand failed to catch on.

In 2003, LA Gear went through a relaunch, this time with an emphasis on men's performance footwear as the Catapult line was reintroduced. Los Angeles Lakers rookie Luke Walton was signed as the brand's spokesman and appeared in several print ads. Ron Artest also was endorsed for a brief period in 2004 and 2005 in conjunction with his "Tru Warrier" persona, but the company dropped him as spokesman following the 2004 Pacers–Pistons brawl. LA Gear primarily marketed fashion athletic shoes for women and continues to do so to this day, although a recent relaunch of the brand has resulted in the de-emphasis of these lines (with LA Gear discontinuing the new Catapult line for men altogether). In 2008, LA Gear rereleased its Unstoppable retro range, which saw sneaker lines such as the KAJ and Starshooter High available in a variety of new colors. It rereleased its Stardust women's fashion line in 2009 and later released a new version of the popular LA Lights. LA Gear also joined the rocker bottom shoe craze that year by releasing the Walk N Tone sneaker line for women.

LA Gear released its Hollywood men's sneaker in 2012 alongside the Unstoppable range. In October 2014, LA Gear underwent another revamp of some of its product lines and announced its 2015 spring/summer launch with new sneakers such as the LA Lights Liquid gold edition and the T Raww Runner, endorsed by American rapper Tyga. In February 2022, Australian department store Big W launched an exclusive range of LA Gear to the Australian market.

== Endorsements ==
One of the original athletes to endorse LA Gear shoes was NBA player Kareem Abdul-Jabbar, who ended a long association with Adidas to sign with the upstart company toward the end of his playing career. Several other NBA stars wore the brand, perhaps the most notable being Karl Malone who appeared in several commercials for the brand beginning in the early 1990s. Hakeem Olajuwon was another LA Gear-endorsing basketball player who after being signed stayed with the brand until 1994 when he was contracted by Spalding to endorse a line of basketball shoes with his name and number.

San Francisco 49ers quarterback Joe Montana signed an endorsement deal with LA Gear in 1990 after working with Adidas and later Mizuno for most of his career and quickly became the company's feature athlete. Hockey star Wayne Gretzky was also signed as an endorser while he was still playing with the Los Angeles Kings, and eventually would have his own line of street hockey shoes before his endorsement contract expired.

Unlike other athletic shoe companies of the day, LA Gear was not averse to going outside of sports to find endorsement contracts. One of the earliest celebrities to sign an endorsement deal with the company was singer Belinda Carlisle, who appeared in a series of print ads for LA Gear when the brand first began to become popular (as seen in this ad). Two of the most notable celebrities to endorse the shoes were Michael Jackson, who promoted shoes for both men and women, and Paula Abdul, who was signed away from Reebok in 1991 and whose shoe became one of the biggest sellers of the early 1990s. The company helped set the trend of having non-sports celebrities endorsing athletic brands.

== Designs ==
Catapult: The LA Gear equivalent of Air Jordans, a high-end basketball shoe and training shoe line. The original spokesman for the line was Karl Malone.

Regulator: The inflatable shoe craze of the early 1990s spawned this shoe, LA Gear's answer to the Reebok Pump. The shoe featured a large pumping button on the tongue (larger than the Reebok Pump's) and a switch on top that deflated the shoe when pushed to the right.

LA Lights: One of LA Gear's most successful lines, which came out in 1992. LA Gear launched its kids line of LA Lights at Foot Locker and Kids Foot Locker at $50 retail. LA Gear was selling over 5 million pairs of Kids "LA Lights" per year in the 1990s despite other brands selling lighted technology in the lower distribution channels. Light technology for kids has been one of the most successful launches in the athletic shoe industry with over 100 million pairs sold in all distribution channels. The shoes were also used as survival gear to locate stranded individuals and children during blizzards, leading to increased demand prior to storms.

LA Tech: In 1992 LA Gear began marketing "Light Gear" CrossRunner shoes with red LED lights in the heels, and once a wearer's heel hit the ground the lights would light up and continue to do so with every step. LA Gear went further in 1993 by introducing the Leap Gear line of performance basketball shoes, which would light up when the player would jump off the ground. The program's success led to an exclusive national television advertising campaign with over 2000 doors at Foot Locker Inc.

Flak: A brand similar to popular Nike and Adidas products during the mid-1990s.

Although de-emphasized, LA Gear continued to market shoes to women, such as the Dancer line, a high-top shoe similar to the Reebok Freestyle in design, and Street Shots, featuring both high and low top sneakers sold primarily in white with silver trim. Other popular lines included Brats, Boots, and Street Dancers for men.

As part of the change LA Gear created a logo for its women's line, using a gray diamond shape with the company name inside it.
