= Reebok Freestyle =

Athletic shoe by Reebok

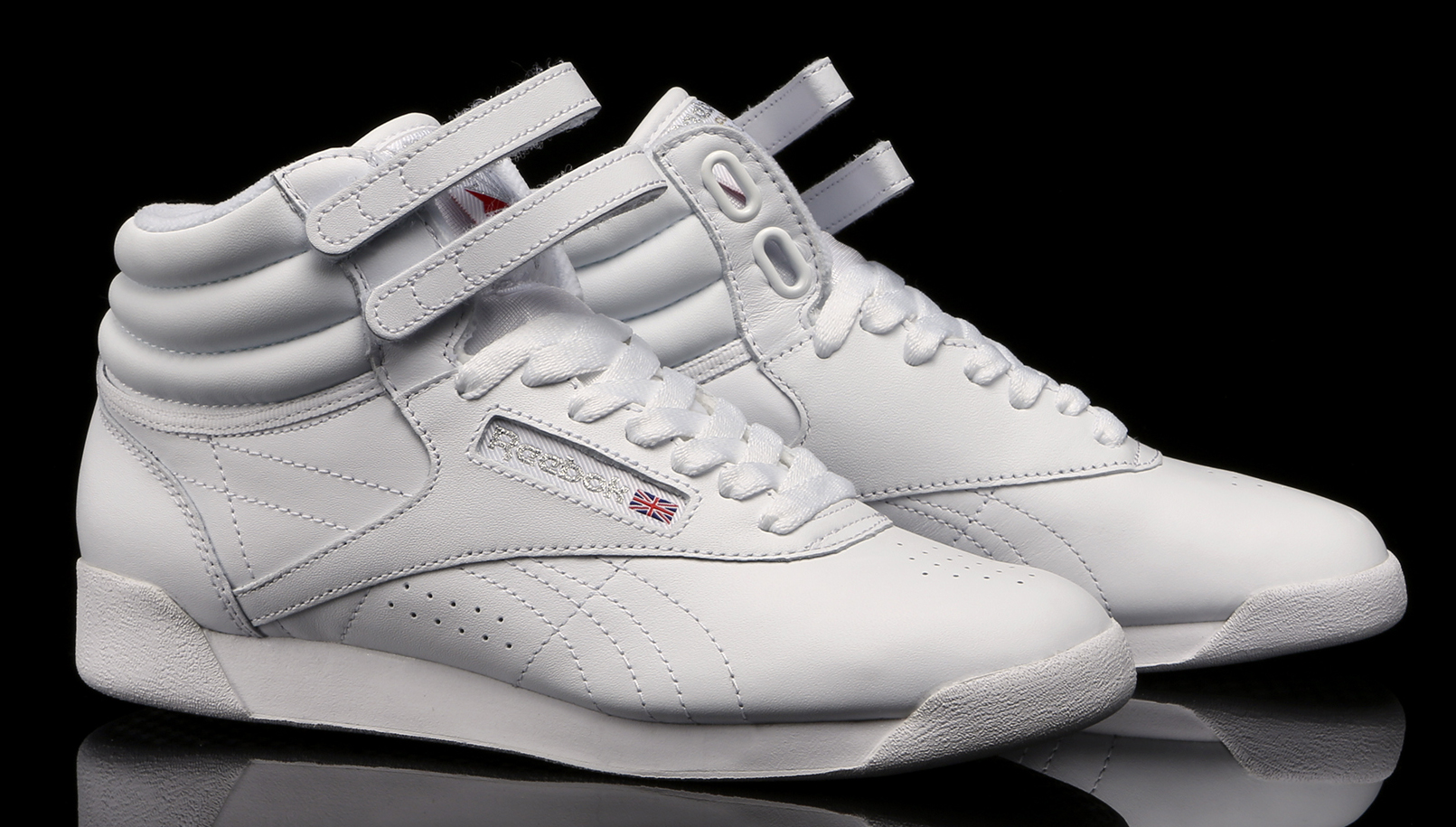
- Product type: Sneakers
- Current owner: Reebok
- Introduced: 1982; 44 years ago
- Related brands: Reebok Classics
- Markets: Worldwide
- Website: reebok.com/freestyle

Reebok Freestyle is an athletic shoe introduced in 1982 by Reebok. The Freestyle was the first sneaker designed (by Angel Martinez) and marketed for women. It helped Reebok into the mainstream athletic wear market and fashion scene along with becoming one of the most popular athletic shoes of all time. In 1984, the shoe accounted for more than half of Reebok sales. The Reebok Freestyle was popular during the 1980s aerobics craze and is still in production and remodeled through various collections and style variations.

== History ==
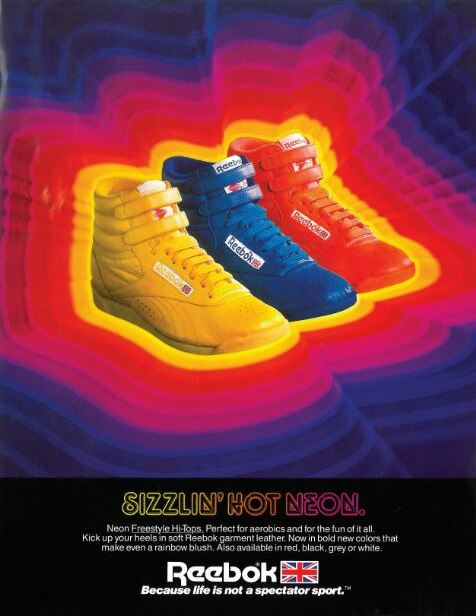
Freestyle Hi advertisement of 1985

Released in 1982, the Reebok Freestyle was the first athletic shoe designed for women, even though it has also become fairly popular among males. Martinez and Steve Liggett, head of Reebok production, were instrumental developing the shoe. The shoe was made to accommodate aerobics workouts and was released during the height of the 1980s aerobics craze. Fitness Instructor Denise Austin was one first to promote the shoe by wearing them at a sport and fitness exposition in Los Angeles. "I absolutely loved this time in my career, I was the first spokesperson for the very first aerobic shoe," Austin said in a November, 22, 2019 Facebook post. Following the debut and success of the Freestyle, Reebok began sponsoring clinics and workout programs throughout the 1980s and 1990s. The shoes could be seen on the trainers of Jane Fonda workout videos and classes, and the Step Reebok workout routine was released in 1989.

By 1983, Reebok's sales were over $13 million, accounting for half of the company's total sales and the following year concluded with $66 million in sales.

The Freestyle success and the athletic shoe fad of the late 1980s saw new competition from Avia, LA Gear, and Nike. Many competitors, like LA Gear and off-price retailers like Fayva, had models that looked like the Freestyle high-top complete with velcro enclosures.

== Description ==
The Freestyle debuted as a terrycloth lined sneaker with "glove-soft" leather designed for aerobics workouts. The shoe was designed for fitness purposes but became used for casual wear as well. The shoe comes in two different styles including below the ankle, like a tennis shoe, or the high-top style that covers the ankle, like a basketball shoe. The Freestyle high-top features two velcro straps that fasten around the ankle and is made in women's sizes, but is considered unisex, being also worn by men. Both the low-top and high-top were offered in white, black, red, yellow, blue, pink, orange, and green colors over the years.

=== Athletic use ===
Consumers were impressed with the styling, comfort, and support the shoe provided for working out. The Freestyle's athletic use spread to walking, bodybuilding, dance, and cheerleading. Ms. Olympia Cory Everson wore Freestyle high-tops frequently in competition, working out, and on ESPN's BodyShaping program. Reebok sponsored the Los Angeles Laker Girls in the late 1980s and supplied them with white Freestyle high-tops. Since then, other professional cheerleading and dance teams have used Freestyles. High school and college cheerleading teams have used Freestyles as their shoe of choice. It is also used in competitive aerobics.

=== Casual wear ===
Outside the gym, the Freestyle became popular casual wear. Women could wear Freestyles with jeans, shorts, capri pants, sweatpants, tights or leggings, and even as commuter shoes to work. In the 1980s, Freestyles were often seen with flop or slouch socks which were usually stretched over the bottom of the pant leg to help highlight the shoe.

== Styles ==
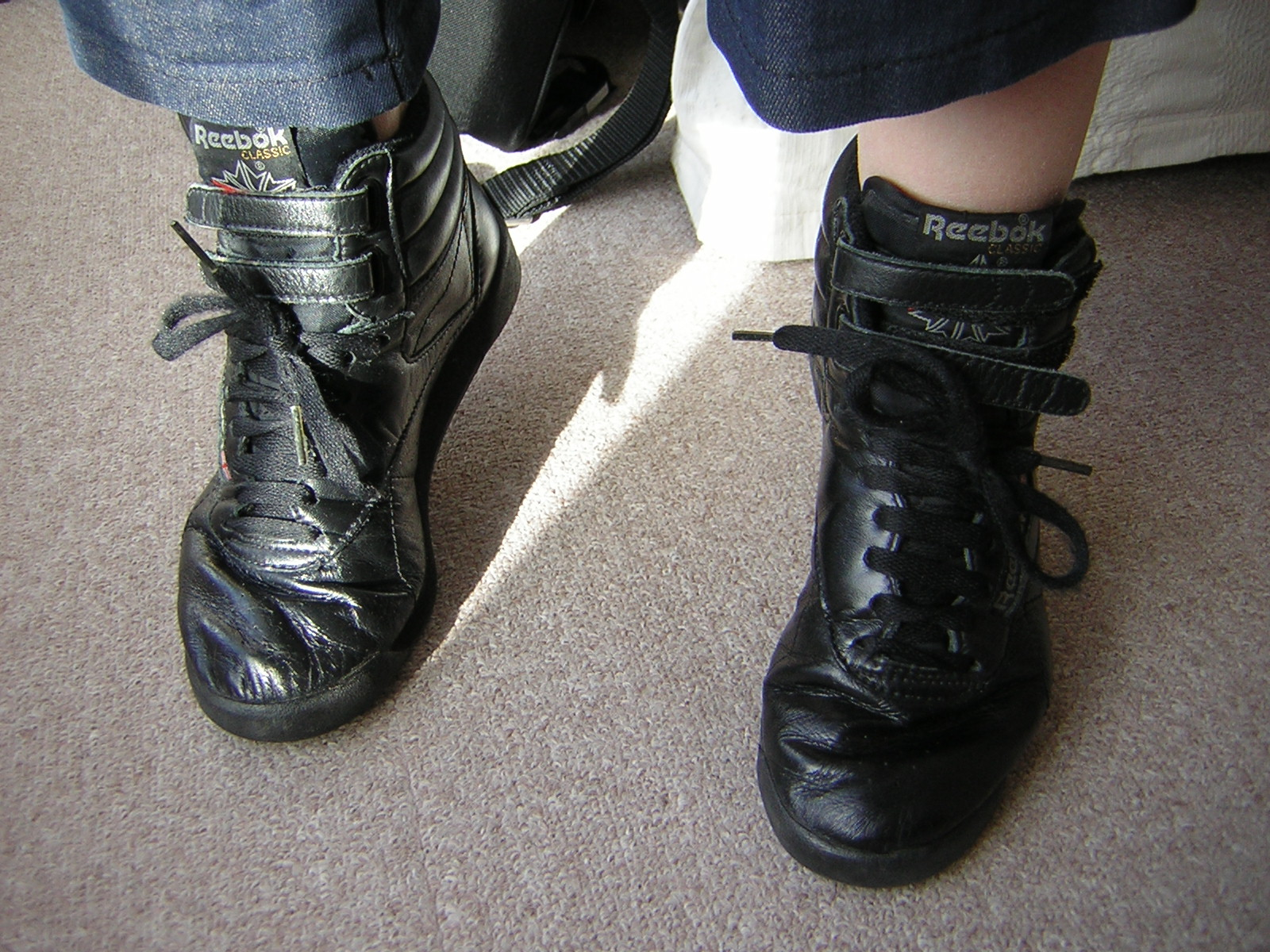
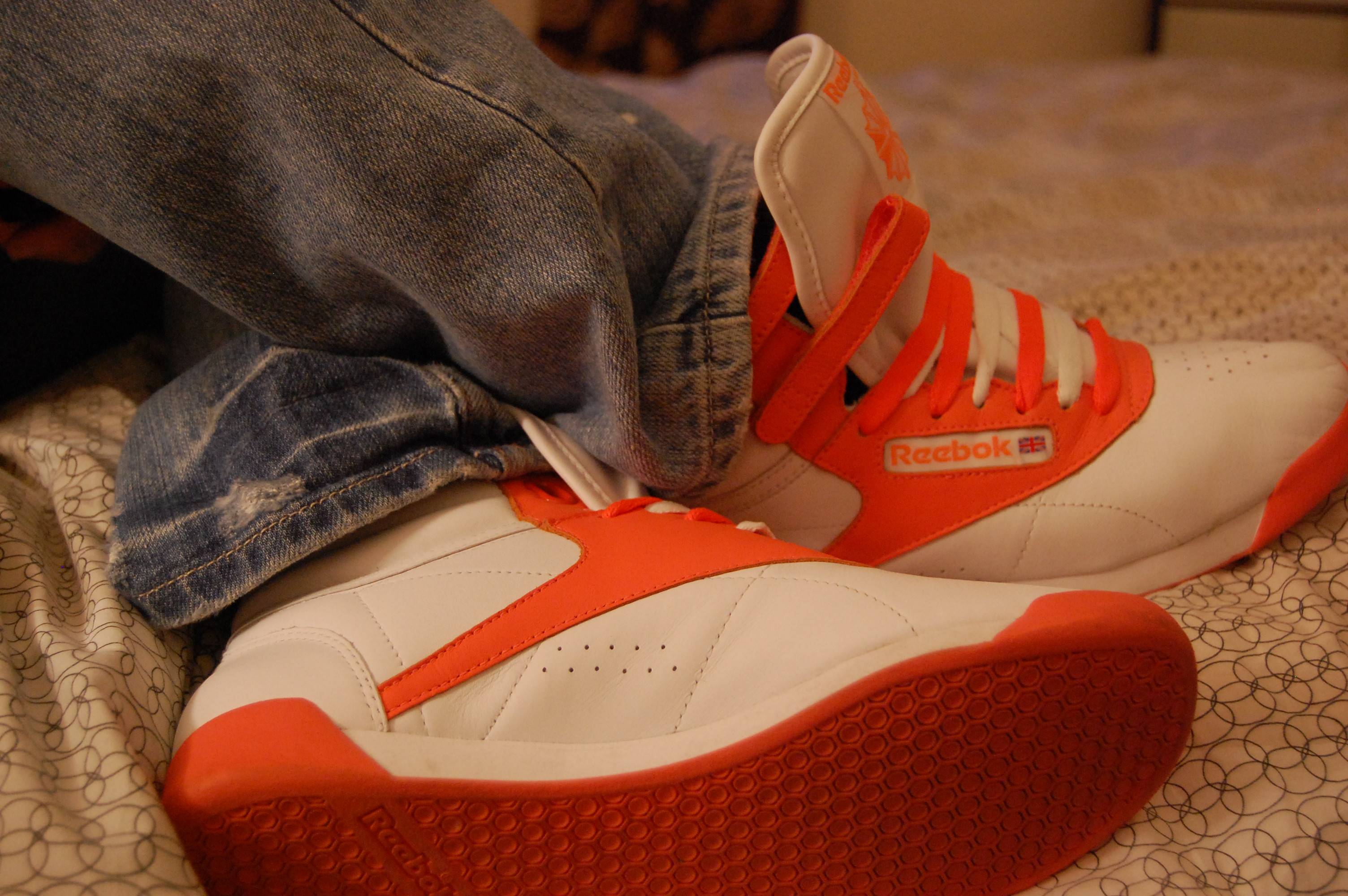
Reebok Freestyle in black and orange

After the Freestyle's initial debut, Reebok released various collaborations and special edition styles of the shoe. The Freestyle had several special editions released in the 1980s including the Rainbow Suede version. The Freestyle celebrated its 25th anniversary with a special collection of six limited-edition shoes that debuted at a New York City exclusive event in March 2007. The Reebok sponsored event called "Freestyle Forever" included celebrity guests such as Cybill Shepherd, Brooke Shields, and Tara Reid and highlighted moments in past and present Freestyle history.

In 2008, Reebok introduced a Freestyle collaboration with the French boutique Colette and American women's wear company, Married to the Mob. The Reebok Freestyle - Wonder Woman was released in 2009 and had design features such as a red metallic upper with a star-spangled back tab that mimicked the costume of comic book character Diana Prince, aka Wonder Woman, and the lace-stay looked similar to the tiara of the superhero while the two gold metallic straps that closely resembled her bracelets.

Alicia Keys teamed up with Reebok in 2012 for a collection of different shoes including high-top Freestyles and Freestyle Double Bubble along with Classic Nylon Slim and Princess sneakers. Reebok introduced collaborations with Takahiro Miyashita and the Sand.W.Man project in 2014 for the Reebok Freestyle high-top and the Reebok Ex-o-Fit released in a signature monochromatic, sandy style look.

In 2018, the Netflix original series GLOW and Reebok Classics teamed up to create two new Freestyle Hi designs to be worn by characters on the show. Costume designer Beth Morgan shared how the partnership came together: "I reached out to Reebok about product placement since we used the shoes so often in the show to see if they had any reproductions of the authentic shoes. Through those conversations, I said it would be awesome to design shoes that were authentic to the period, and they were all on board... The whole idea behind the collaboration is that the product would be in the show, and we could sell them to our fans after we air."

In 2026, recording artist Karol G was announced as Reebok's global brand ambassador to coincide with a rebrand of the Reebok Classic range including the Reebok Freestyle. The new range features original garment leather and terrycloth lining, and is offered in both low and high top versions.

== In popular culture ==
Film

- In Jumpin' Jack Flash (1986), Whoopi Goldberg wore high-top red, white, and yellow pairs.
- In Return of the Killer Tomatoes (1988), Karen M. Waldron wore a white, high-top pair through half of the movie.
- In Frankie and Johnny (1991), Michelle Pfeiffer wore a white, high-top pair playing a waitress. The shoes can be seen on movie posters.
- In Masterminds (2016), Kristin Wiig wore a white, high-top pair as part of her 1990s era costume.
- In The Bad Batch (2016), Suki Waterhouse wore a white, high-top pair with a prosthetic leg throughout most of the movie.
- In Chick Fight (2020), Malin Åkerman wore a white, high-top pair throughout most of the movie.

Music

- Rolling Stones front-man Mick Jagger wore a pair of Freestyles in his "Dancing in the Street" video with David Bowie in 1985.
- French singer Yelle (Julie Budet) wore various colored high-top Freestyles on stage during her concerts. At a 2008 Reebok Freestyle World Tour Collection event, she promoted a special Freestyle Paris edition, which was part of a six fashion-forward city collection.
- English singer Perrie Edwards wore a white, high-top pair while performing with Little Mix on the set of Good Morning America on June 7, 2013.
- Canadian Singer Kiesza has also been photographed wearing various Freestyle shoes, both casually and in her music video for her single "Hideaway".
- Rapper, singer, and model Iggy Azalea wore white Freestyle high-tops and her back-up singers wore black high-top pairs while performing "Fancy" and "Beg for It" at the 2014 American Music Awards. The shoes were paired with retro gym outfits and scrunched down socks.
- Singer Shakira wore a pair of white high-tops to match her 1980s inspired workout outfit in the "Girl Like Me" video, which was released on December 4, 2020.

Slang

- The slang name for the shoes was a "fifty-four elevens" because the retail price for a pair was usually $49.99 and with tax, in New York City, they cost $54.11.

Television

- Actress Cybill Shepherd wore a bright orange high-top pair of Reebok Freestyles, with a black strapless gown, at the 1985 Emmy Awards.
- In 1986, actress Whoopi Goldberg wore a white high-top pair at the 43rd annual Golden Globe Awards.
- Soleil Moon Frye wore two different colored shoes in combination, like white and black or red and yellow, as the title character of the Punky Brewster television series, which popularized this style.
- In The Middle, Sue Heck (Eden Sher) wore various colors of Reebok Freestyle high-tops throughout the entire 2009 to 2018 run of the series.
- In The Goldbergs, Beverly Goldberg (Wendi McLendon-Covey) regularly wore various high-top pairs through the series.
- In the 2019 Netflix series Stranger Things, Season 3, Eleven (Millie Bobby Brown) wore a white, high-top pair during the whole season 3 episodes.
- In the 2020 Netflix miniseries The Haunting of Bly Manor, Dani Clayton (Victoria Pedretti) wore a white, high-top pair in eight of the nine episodes.
- In the second season of La Brea, Riley Valez (Veronica St. Clair) wore a white, high-top pair.

Events

- In the UFC during 1996, some round girls (Vanessa Hanson, Brittney Palmer, Chrissy Blair) wore white, high-top pair during events

== See also ==
- Reebok Classics
- 1980s in fashion
