= Reebok =

American footwear and clothing company

Reebok International Limited

- Reebok Wordmark.
- Formerly: Reebok
- Type: Private (1958–1985); Public (1985–2005); Subsidiary (2005–present)
- Industry: Textile, Sports equipment
- Predecessor: J.W. Foster and Sons
- Founded: 1958; 68 years ago (Note: Predecessor J.W. Foster and Sons was established by Joseph W. Foster to manufacture athletic shoes. The original family business was eventually absorbed by Reebok in 1976.) in Bolton, England
- Founder: Jeff and Joe Foster
- Headquarters: Bolton, England; (1958–1984); Canton, Massachusetts, U.S.; (1984–2016); Boston, Massachusetts, U.S.; (since 2016)
- Area served: Worldwide
- Key people: Todd Krinsky (CEO)
- Products: Sportswear, footwear
- Brands: List: Classic; Freestyle; Nano; Princess; Pump; Ventilator; Zig
- Owner: Authentic Brands Group
- Parent: Adidas (2005–2021); Authentic Brands Group (2021–present)
- Subsidiaries: Galaxy Universal
- Website: reebok.com

Reebok International Limited (/ˈriːbɒk/ REE-bok) is an American apparel, accessories and sports equipment brand that is a part of Authentic Brands Group. Since its acquisition by Authentic in 2022, Reebok has re-entered performance sport and meaningfully expanded its Classics and lifestyle lines. Reebok is one of the largest sports brands worldwide, generating $5B in annual retail sales. It was established in England in 1958 as a companion company to J.W. Foster and Sons, a sporting goods company which had been founded in 1895 in Bolton, Lancashire. From 1958 until 1986, the brand featured the flag of the United Kingdom in its logo to signify the origins of the company. It was bought by German sporting goods company Adidas in 2005, then sold to the United States–based Authentic Brands Group in 2021. The company's global headquarters are located in Boston, Massachusetts, in the Seaport District.

Reebok's European headquarters are located in London. Reebok's parent company, Authentic Brands Group, is headquartered in New York City, with additional offices in London, Los Angeles, Miami, Mexico, Shanghai, and Seoul.

== History ==
=== Early years ===
In 1895, Joseph William Foster at the age of 14 started work in his bedroom above his father's sweetshop in Bolton, England, and designed some of the earliest spiked running shoes. After his ideas progressed, he founded his business J.W. Foster in 1900; later he joined with his sons and changed the company name to J.W. Foster and Sons. Foster opened a small factory called Olympic Works, and gradually became famous among athletes for his "running pumps". The company began distributing its shoes across the United Kingdom, which were worn by British athletes. They were made famous by 100m Olympic champion Harold Abrahams in the 1924 Summer Olympics held in Paris.

In 1958, in Bolton, two of the founder's grandsons, Jeff and Joe Foster, formed a companion company "Reebok", having found the name in a dictionary won in a sprint race by Joe as a boy. The name is Afrikaans for the grey rhebok, a type of African antelope.

In 1979, American businessman Paul Fireman took notice of Reebok at the Chicago NSGA (National Sporting Goods of America) Show. Fireman had previously been an executive with his family business Boston Camping, and negotiated a deal to license and distribute the Reebok brand in the United States. The division became known as Reebok USA Ltd. That year, Fireman introduced three new shoes to the market at $60. By 1981, Reebok reached more than $1.5 million in sales.

=== 1980s–1990s ===
In 1982, Reebok debuted the Reebok Freestyle aerobics shoe, the first athletic shoe designed for women. The following year Reebok's sales were $13 million, and Fireman bought the English-based parent company in 1984. Officially an American company in 1985, Reebok had its initial public offering on the New York Stock Exchange under the ticker symbol RBK and was renamed Reebok International Limited.

The brand established itself in professional tennis with the Newport Classic shoe, popularized by Boris Becker and John McEnroe, and the Revenge Plus, also known as the Club C. The company began expanding from tennis and aerobics shoes to running and basketball throughout the mid to late 1980s, the most significant segment of the athletic footwear industry. One of the company's most iconic technologies, the Reebok Pump, debuted in 1989 with more than 100 professional athletes wearing the footwear by 1992, including Shaquille O'Neal.

In 1986, Reebok changed the company logo it had used since its founding, from the flag of the United Kingdom to the vector logo—an abstract Union Flag streak across a race track—which mirrored the design of the side flashes of its shoes. The switch signaled the transition of the company into a performance brand as it began licensing deals with professional athletes in the NBA and NFL. Reebok also began developing sports clothing and accessories, and introduced a line of children's athletic shoes called Weeboks. It acquired Rockport for $118.5 million in 1986 and Avia for $180 million a year later. By mid-decade, Reebok's sales were about $1 billion, and it overtook Nike, Inc. as the largest athletic shoe manufacturer in the US before losing the top position in 1988.

Reebok worked with fitness professional Gin Miller in the late 1980s to develop Step Reebok, based on Miller's wooden prototype step and her ideas for step aerobics. The Step was evaluated in physiology trials undertaken by Drs. Lorna and Peter Francis at San Diego State University. In August 1989 the Step was ready, made in molded plastic by Sports Step of Atlanta with Reebok's name on it, and by March 1990, the step aerobics classes were attracting media attention. Miller promoted Step Reebok in person, touring the U.S. and demonstrating it at exercise studios. Step aerobics became widely popular, helping the company sell many thousands of adjustable-height step devices and millions of high-top shoes with ankle support. Step aerobics peaked in 1995 with 11.4 million people exercising in that style.

Reebok named Carl Yankowski president and chief executive officer of the brand in 1998, replacing former president Robert Meers. Yankowski stepped down one year later to accept an executive position at another company. Reebok chairman and CEO Paul Fireman took over as president for the first time in 12 years.

=== 2000s ===
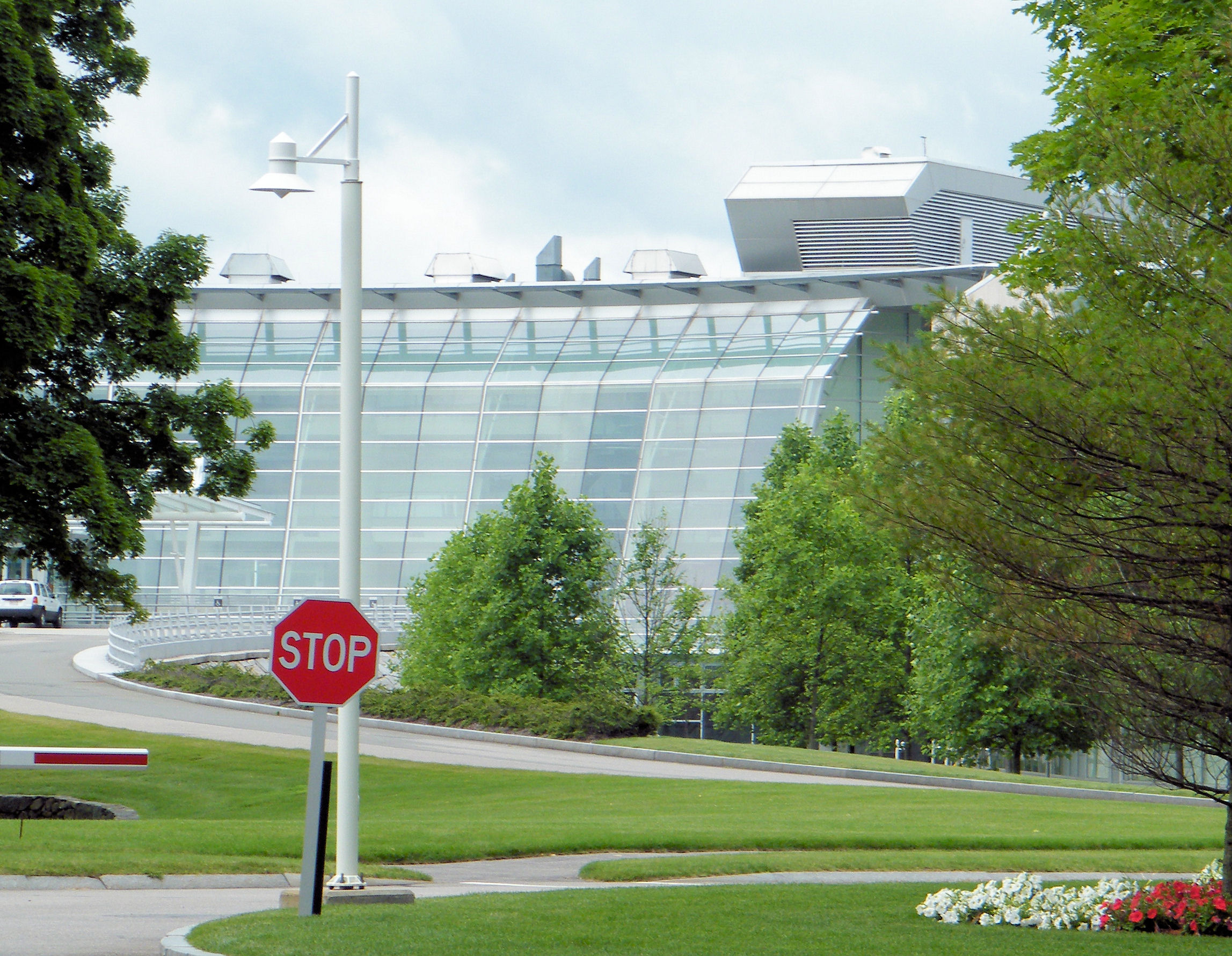
Former Reebok headquarters in Canton, Massachusetts, U.S.

In 2001, Reebok hired Peter Arnell with the Arnell Group as its lead marketing agency, which created several advertising campaigns, including a successful series of Terry Tate commercials. The agency also helped develop the Yao Ming line, and the fashion-oriented Rbk brand. In December, Jay Margolis was named as Reebok's president and COO. After launching retail flagship stores in China, Dhaka, London, Los Angeles, New York, Philadelphia and Tokyo, Margolis resigned in October 2004. Fireman took over as president after signing a new long-term employment agreement with the Reebok board of directors. In 2016, Reebok announced it would move its global headquarters from Canton to Boston with intentions to lay off about 300 employees as part of the move.

Reebok continued to expand in sports in the 2000s. In tennis, Reebok signed Venus Williams in 1995 to a five-year, $12 million contract when she was 15, later renewing the partnership in December 2000 with a reported $40 million, five-year deal described at the time as the richest endorsement contract ever for a female athlete; the company also held endorsement deals with Andy Roddick (2000–2005), Michael Chang, and Patrick Rafter. In soccer, Reebok manufactured kits for Liverpool F.C. from 1996 to 2006, Bolton Wanderers (whose home ground was named the Reebok Stadium from 1997 to 2014), and Manchester City, while endorsing players including Ryan Giggs, Thierry Henry, Dennis Bergkamp, Andriy Shevchenko, and Iker Casillas. Reebok also held league-wide licensing agreements during this period with the NFL (2002–2011), NBA (2001–2006), NHL, MLB, and MLS.

Reebok acquired official National Hockey League sponsor CCM in 2004. The company began manufacturing ice hockey equipment under the CCM and Reebok brands. It phased out the CCM name on NHL authentic and replica jerseys, using the Reebok logo since 2005. In March 2005, Reebok signed Canadian junior hockey star Sidney Crosby to a multi-year, multimillion-dollar endorsement deal ahead of his entry into the NHL, making the 17-year-old the highest-paid hockey equipment endorser at the time. CCM became Reebok-CCM Hockey in 2007. Reebok moved most of its hockey equipment lines to CCM after 2015.

=== 2010s ===
In 2010, under the ownership of Adidas, Reebok announced a 10-year partnership with CrossFit, becoming the official footwear and apparel provider of the CrossFit Games. In 2011, Reebok launched the Nano, the first shoe specifically designed for CrossFit, developed with input from CrossFit athletes to support high-impact movements, weightlifting, and short-distance running; the franchise has since gone through more than a dozen iterations and is widely regarded as "the shoe of CrossFit." In December 2014, Reebok signed a six-year deal with the UFC to become the promotion's exclusive global outfitter, a landmark partnership extending the brand's training credibility into combat sports and mixed martial arts. In January 2015, Reebok launched its "Be More Human" brand campaign, a fully integrated marketing initiative encouraging individuals to push their limits and reach their full potential through fitness; the campaign debuted with a Super Bowl pre-game television spot and introduced the Reebok Delta logo, representing physical, mental, and social change. In November 2017, Reebok announced a long-term partnership with British fashion designer Victoria Beckham, with the first Reebok x Victoria Beckham collection launching in 2018.

In 2017, Adidas sold CCM to a Canadian private equity firm, Birch Hill Equity Partners, for around $110 million.

=== 2020s ===
Reebok began collaborating with French luxury fashion house Maison Margiela in 2020, debuting the split-toe Tabi Instapump Fury at Maison Margiela's Spring/Summer 2020 Artisanal show during Paris Couture Week. In 2022, Reebok was acquired by Authentic Brands Group in a deal valued at approximately $2.5 billion (€2.1 billion). Under Authentic's ownership, the brand has publicly announced a return to sport, signing athletes and launching products across basketball, golf, tennis, football, and hockey. In October 2023, Reebok appointed Shaquille O'Neal as President of Reebok Basketball and Allen Iverson as Vice President, marking the brand's strategic return to performance basketball after more than a decade away from the category. Later that month, Reebok signed LSU national champion Angel Reese in the brand's first major name, image, and likeness (NIL) deal; Reese later debuted Reebok's first new performance basketball sneaker since the early 2010s, the "Engine A," in 2024 and released her signature shoe, the Angel Reese 1, in September 2025. In December 2024, Reebok and the WNBA announced a multi-year agreement designating Reebok as an authorized footwear supplier for the league. In December 2024, Reebok announced a long-term partnership with two-time US Open champion Bryson DeChambeau and his LIV Golf team Crushers GC, naming him the official face of Reebok Golf apparel and footwear and introducing the Nano Golf performance shoe. In 2025, Washington Capitals right wing Tom Wilson was announced as a Reebok ambassador as part of the brand's return to hockey. In May 2025, Reebok signed Detroit-native and Arkansas Razorbacks guard Darius Acuff Jr. to an NIL deal, later expanding it into a signature shoe agreement, making Acuff the first NCAA men's basketball player to receive a signature shoe deal from a major U.S. brand while still in college. In January 2026, Reebok signed Colombian singer Karol G as a global brand ambassador, naming her the face of the brand's "Born Classic. Worn for Life." campaign to mark the relaunch of the Reebok Classics line. In March 2026, Reebok announced partnerships with Serbian footballer Dušan Vlahović and Chelsea defender Trevoh Chalobah, coinciding with the debut of the Reebok Sidewinder, the brand's new on-field football boot. In May 2026, Reebok signed Polish tennis player Magdalena Fręch and launched the Phase Evo, its first performance tennis shoe in nearly two decades.

=== Adidas ownership ===
Following an intellectual property lawsuit in August 2005, Adidas acquired Reebok as a subsidiary, but maintained operations under their separate brand names. Adidas acquired all of the outstanding Reebok shares and completed the deal valued at $3.8 billion. Following the acquisition, Adidas replaced Reebok as the official uniform supplier for the NBA in 2006 with an 11-year deal that included the WNBA, replica jerseys, and warm-up gear.

Reebok named Paul Harrington president and CEO of the company in January 2006, replacing Paul Fireman who was acting president since 2004. Harrington joined the company in 1994 and was Reebok's senior vice president of global operations and chief supply chain officer.

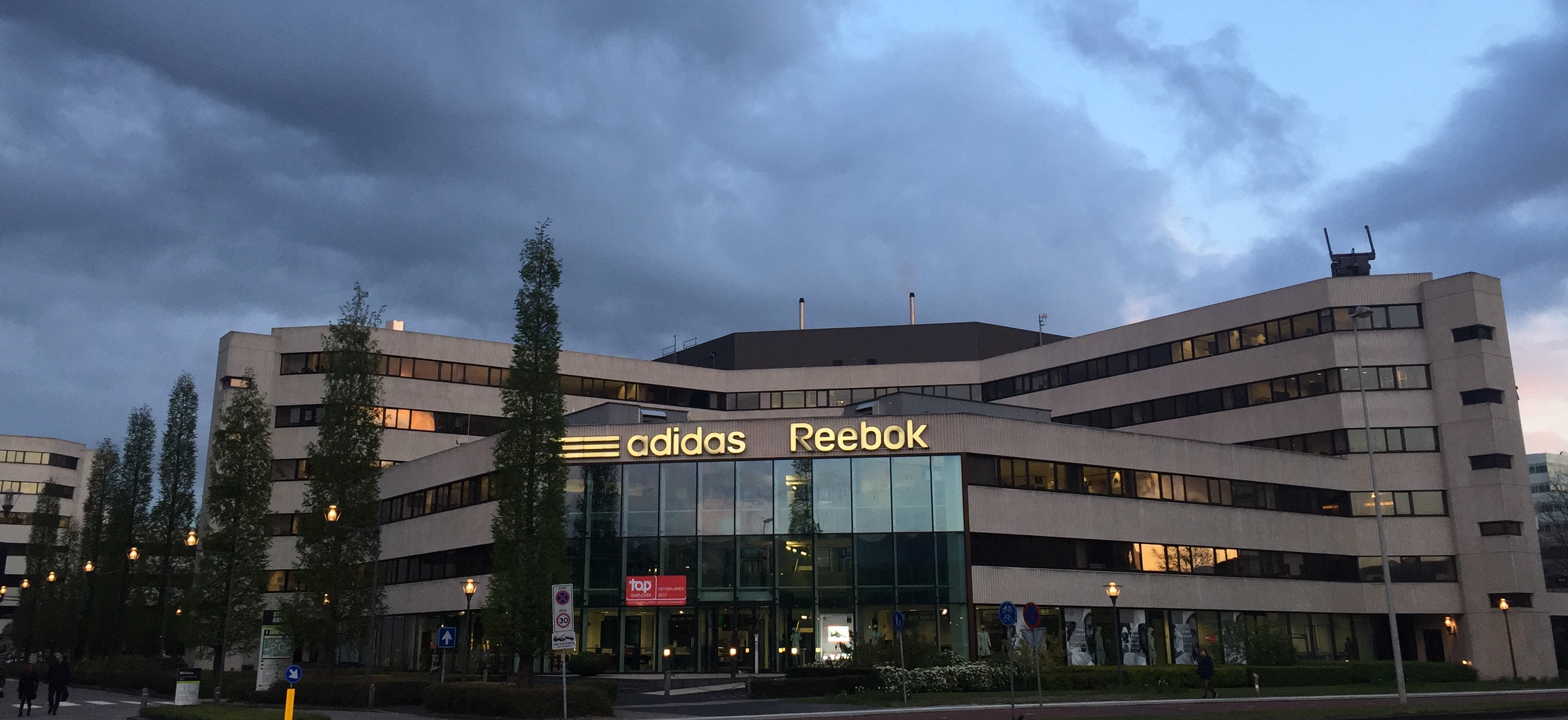
Adidas Reebok European headquarters in Amsterdam (2017)

In 2010, Reebok announced a partnership with CrossFit, a fitness company and competitive fitness sport, including sponsoring the CrossFit Games, opening CrossFit studios, and introducing a line of co-branded footwear and apparel for Fall 2011. The 10-year CrossFit partnership, which ran through 2020, established Reebok as a foundational brand within the functional fitness community and gave the company deep credibility with training athletes worldwide. In 2011, Reebok launched the Nano, the first shoe specifically designed for CrossFit, developed with input from CrossFit athletes to support high-impact movements, weightlifting, and short-distance running; the Nano became known as "the shoe of CrossFit" and has been continuously updated through more than a dozen iterations. In 2011, Reebok debuted the CrossFit delta symbol on the brand's fitness apparel line. As it lost contracts to make sportswear for professional and college teams (its last uniform rights contract, with the NHL, ended in 2017), Reebok began repositioning itself as a fitness-oriented brand, just as it had been during the 1980s and early 1990s.

In 2013, Reebok announced another fitness partnership with Les Mills International. The agreement included Reebok footwear and clothing integration into Les Mills' fitness programs and media marketing. By July 2013, the red delta sign began appearing on Reebok's fitness collections. The brand announced it was phasing out the vector logo and replacing it with the delta sign, the company's second logo change in more than 120 years. The delta symbol is meant to symbolize three pillars of positive self-change—mental, physical and social—as Reebok increases its presence in the fitness industry with yoga, dance, aerobics and CrossFit.

In December 2014, Reebok signed a six-year deal with the UFC to become the promotion's exclusive global outfitter, a landmark partnership extending the brand's training credibility into combat sports and mixed martial arts. Together, the CrossFit, Les Mills, and UFC partnerships, along with the Nano franchise, built Reebok's equity within the global training community over the course of the 2010s. Following a successful re-release of many of its sneaker and apparel lines from the early/mid 1990s, in November 2019, Reebok announced that it was updating the 1992 vector logo along with the original "Reebok" script in Motter Tektura typeface and restoring both as the company's core brand identity, citing that consumers still identified with them rather than the red delta logo, although the delta would continue to be used on some fitness lines.

=== Authentic Brands Group ownership ===
In February 2021, Adidas announced plans to divest Reebok after analyzing options and expected a hit of about €250 million to operating profit from costs to sell or spin-off the business. In July 2021, Adidas shortlisted bidders for the brand, the finalist companies being Wolverine World Wide and Authentic Brands Group (ABG) on a joint deal, private equity companies Advent International, CVC, Cerberus Capital, and Sycamore Partners, with a deadline for August 2021. On August 12, 2021, it was announced that ABG would acquire the Reebok brand from Adidas for at least $2.5 billion. On March 1, 2022, the acquisition was finalized.

Under Authentic's ownership, Reebok's annual retail sales grew to $5 billion by 2025, and the brand signed athlete partnerships and launched products across basketball, golf, tennis, football, and hockey, while also expanding its Classics and lifestyle lines through fashion collaborations and cultural partnerships.

As of 2026, Reebok's licensed operating partners include Galaxy Universal for the United States and global product creation; GB Brands Europe Limited, a joint venture between Galaxy Universal and the Batra Group, for Europe and the United Kingdom; Slam Jam for the United States, Canada, and Central and Eastern Europe; NewRee Sports for mainland China, Hong Kong, and Macau; and Brand Collective for Australia and New Zealand.

On October 10, 2025, a collective of runners presented a letter from 367 Palestinian sports teams to the headquarters of Reebok, urging the company to retract its sponsorship of the Israel Football Association (IFA). This situation has placed Reebok in a challenging position. As per a statement issued by the Israel Football Association (IFA), it has been reported that Reebok requested its local equipment supplier, MSG Group, to eliminate its logo from the uniforms of the Israeli team. Shortly thereafter, the union declared that the request had been put on hold following discussions between IFA President Moshe Zuares and representatives from Reebok and MSG Group.

== Logo evolution ==
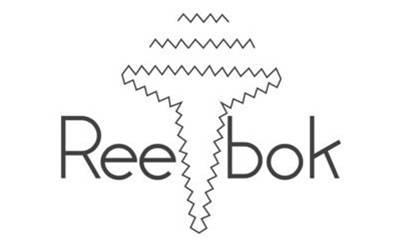
1958–1977

1977–1993
Alongside the flag of the United Kingdom, on Reebok Classic models

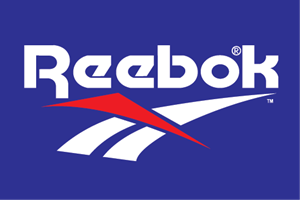
1993–1997

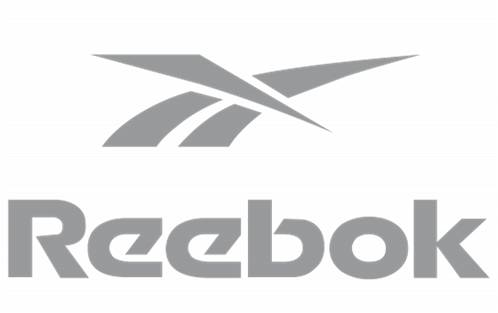
1997–2008

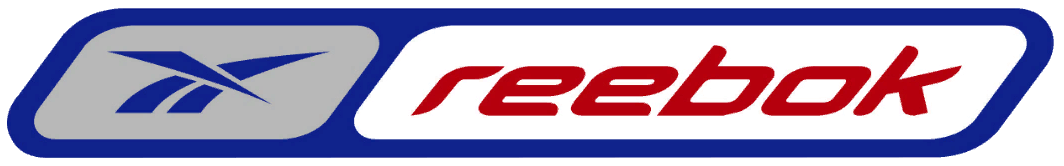
2000–2005 (secondary)

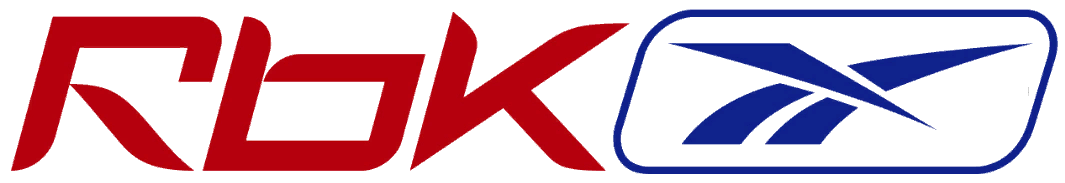
2005–2008 (Rbk subbrand)

2008–2014

2014–2019

2019–2022

2022–present

== Offices ==
Reebok's global headquarters are located in Boston, Massachusetts, in the Seaport District. In EMEA countries, Authentic Brands Group is working with Bounty Apparel in South Africa, Al Boom Marine in the Middle East and North Africa, and Flo Magazacilik in Turkey to grow the business.

== Products ==
Reebok footwear

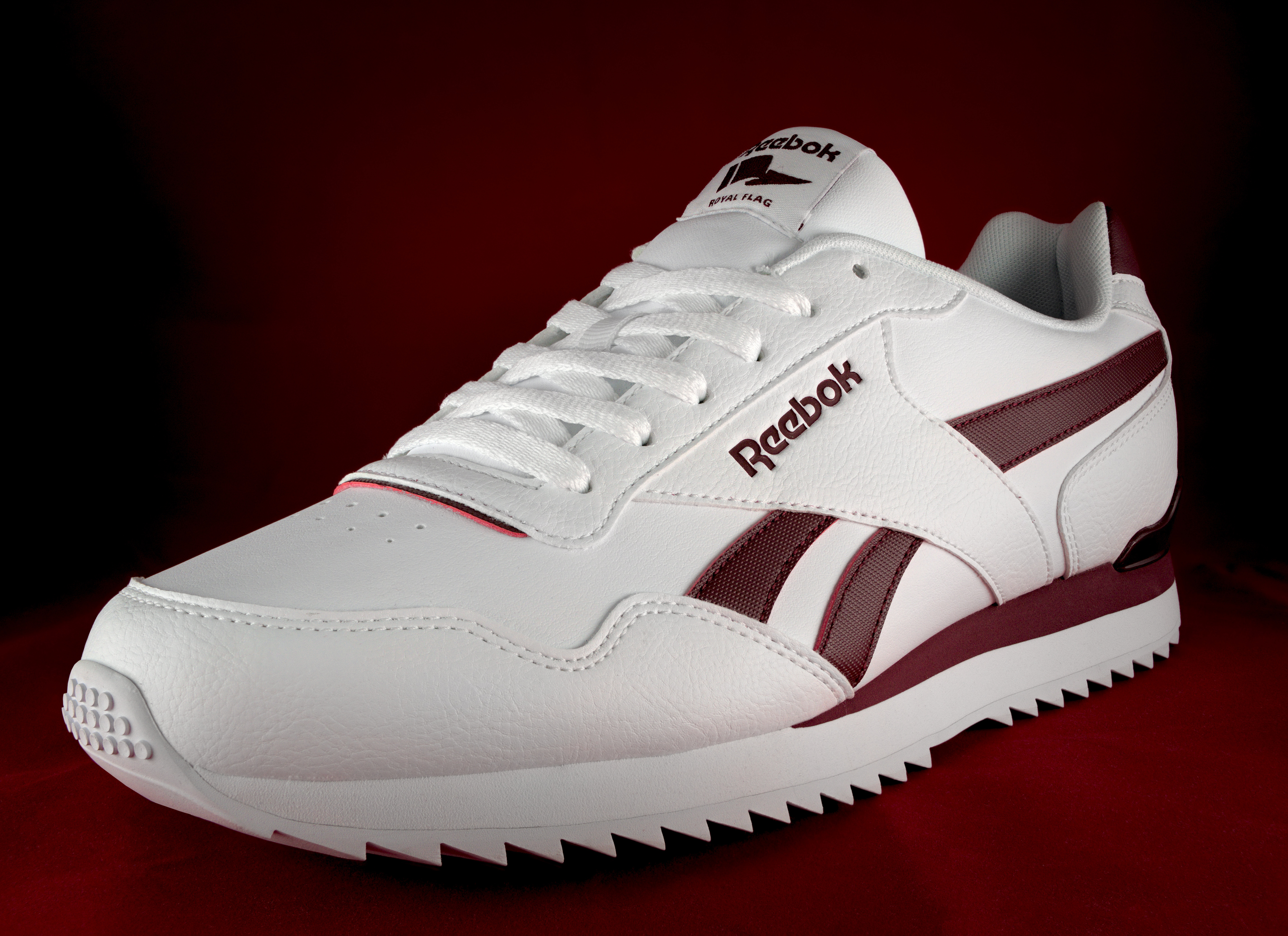
Royal Glide Ripple Clip men's shoe, pictured in 2017

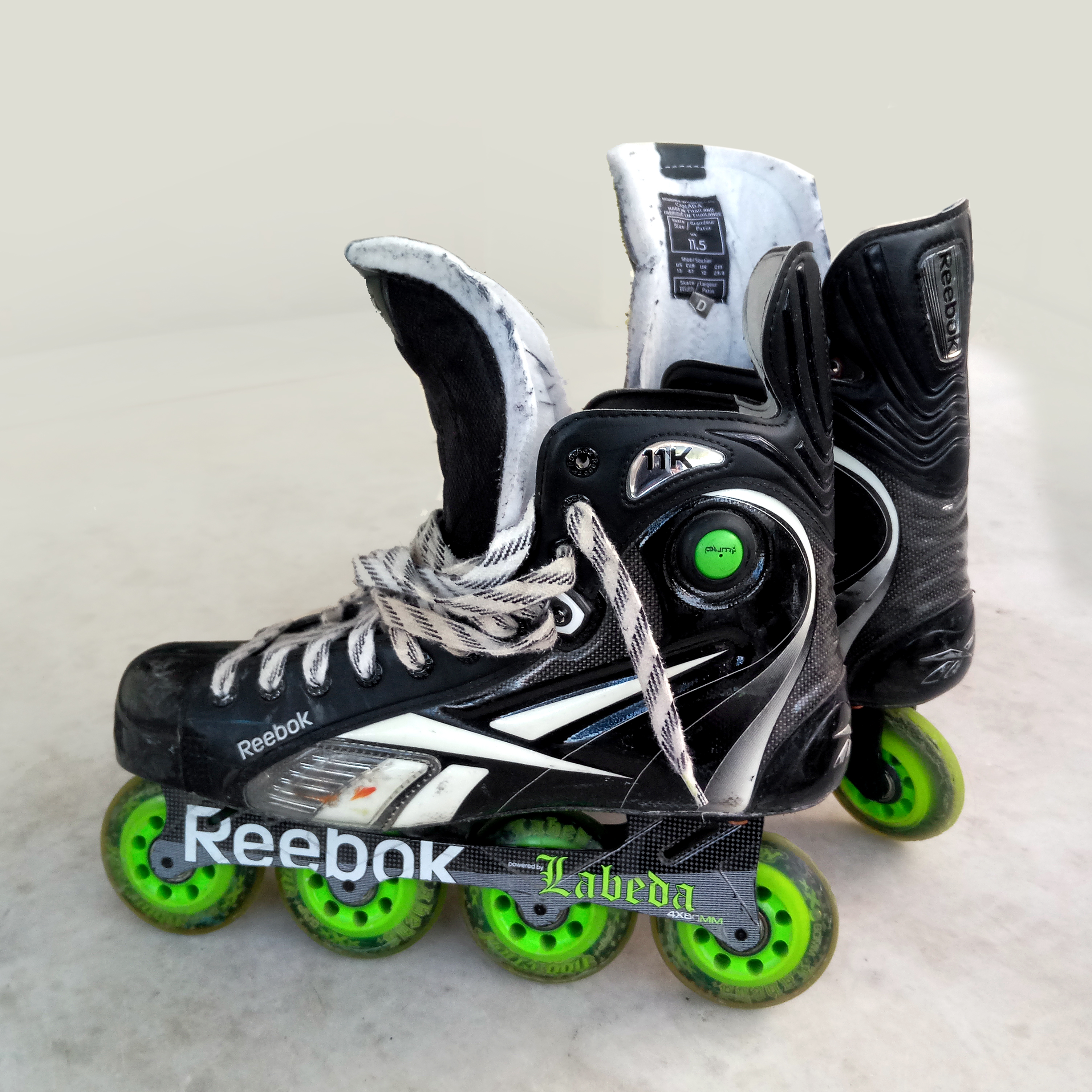
11k Pump inline hockey skates from 2011

Reebok designs, manufactures, distributes and sells fitness, running and CrossFit sportswear including clothing and accessories. The company has released numerous notable styles of footwear including the 1982 introduction of the Reebok Freestyle that was exclusively marketed for women. In 1984, the shoe accounted for more than half of Reebok's sales, and the company subsequently released similar styles including the Princess, Empress and Dutchess lines. That same year, Reebok introduced the Workout, a leather training shoe featuring its now-iconic H-strap, designed to capitalize on the booming gym and fitness culture of the era. In 1985, Reebok launched the Club C—short for "Club Champion"—originally designed as a performance tennis shoe for club players and later established as one of the brand's most enduring lifestyle silhouettes. Following the aerobics trend from the 1980s to early 1990s, Reebok released workout programs called Reebok Step beginning in 1989.

To compete with Nike Air, Reebok introduced Energy Return System (ERS) in 1987, in which a series of horizontal cylinders in the midsole acted as springs. It was gradually phased out upon the arrival of "Hexalite" cushioning. In 1989, the brand introduced one of its signature shoes, the Reebok Pump. The footwear collection was released as a men's basketball shoe and the first adjustable fit controlled with manual air allocation. It was made most famous through Dee Brown's slam dunk contest win in 1991. The Reebok Ventilator, a line of lightweight athletic shoes with vented side panels, was first introduced in 1990.

In 1992, Reebok signed Shaquille O'Neal ahead of his rookie NBA season. That year Reebok released the Shaq Attaq, its first signature shoe for an athlete. Reebok released several further Shaq Attaq models through the mid-1990s before introducing the Shaqnosis in late 1995; the shoe has since been reissued multiple times and remains one of the brand's most recognizable basketball silhouettes. In 1994, Reebok introduced the Instapump Fury, a laceless running shoe that used inflatable air chambers for a customized fit.

In 1996, Reebok signed a $50 million endorsement deal with Allen Iverson when he signed with the Philadelphia 76ers. Iverson collaborated with Reebok during his contract to create the second-longest running basketball shoe line in history, beginning with the Question shoe in 1996 and ending with Answer XIV.

In 2010, the brand released Reebok Zig, an athletic footwear technology and collection of shoes featuring zigzag foam soles designed to push athletes forward. The Reebok Nano was released in 2011 as the first official CrossFit shoe. The company has also partnered with Les Mills and CrossFit to produce more fitness apparel, footwear, and workouts. Reebok debuted the Z-Series foam, a combination of dense midsole and outsole foam that is cushioned but durable, in 2014 on the ZQuick TR with Reebok's new delta logo.

Reebok Future innovation house has developed a new technology called Liquid Factory. A robot will extrude liquid polyurethane and "draw" shoe components without the use of traditional shoe molds.

In 2017, the UFC announced the launch of a new line under the name Fight Night Collection that includes an upgraded version of the Reebok-branded apparels.

Following Reebok's acquisition by Authentic in 2022, the brand launched several new product platforms.

In September 2023, Reebok introduced Reebok LTD (Learn. Test. Design.), a premium line, debuting with the Club C LTD and intended as a platform for elevated collaborations and special projects.

In March 2024, Reebok launched the FloatZig 1. The FloatZig franchise expanded in June 2024 with the FloatZig X1, featuring a carbon-fiber plate, and the FloatZig 1 Adventure for outdoor running. In June 2025, Reebok released the FloatZig 2.

In September 2025, Reebok released the Angel Reese 1, the brand's first signature basketball shoe for a WNBA athlete and its first signature basketball shoe since 2012. Designed in collaboration with two-time WNBA All-Star Angel Reese, the shoe initially launched in three colorways — "Diamond Dust," "Mebounds," and "Receipts Ready" — sold out on Reebok.com within hours of its September 18 debut.

== Endorsements ==
=== Asia ===
Reebok sponsored kits for top seeded Indian Football clubs, Mohun Bagan AC (2006–2011) and East Bengal FC (2003–2005, 2006–2010). Later it sponsored kits for Indian Premier League teams, such as the Royal Challengers Bangalore, Kolkata Knight Riders, Rajasthan Royals and Chennai Super Kings in the first edition of the league held in 2008. However, for the second edition held in 2009, the sponsorships included Royal Challengers Bangalore, Kolkata Knight Riders, Chennai Super Kings, Kings XI Punjab kits. Indian Cricket player Mahendra Singh Dhoni and Bollywood star Bipasha Basu endorsed the Reebok shoes together during 2009.

In May 2012, Reebok India filed a criminal complaint against former managerial employees, Subhinder Singh Prem and Vishnu Bhagat, accusing them of a financial fraud of up to US$233 million. On the charge of alleged Foreign Exchange Management Act (FEMA) violations, Reebok India was booked and may face penal action. Twelve further arrests of employees and associates were made during the same period. As of July 2013, Prem and Bhagat were granted bail by the high court but remained imprisoned following their detainment in September 2012.

Reebok was the official kit supplier for Sri Lanka Cricket from 2009 to 2012.

One of Reebok's most prominent athletes, Indian cricketer Mahendra Singh Dhoni, was named by Forbes as the world's thirty first highest-paid sportsperson in June 2012. At the time of the article, Dhoni endorsed more than 20 other brands in deals that were cumulatively valued at US$23 million.

=== Caribbean ===
In September 2026, Reebok became the official kit supplier for the Dominican Republic's national football teams, known as Sedofútbol, under an agreement with the Dominican Football Federation. The deal covers men's and women's teams in all age categories, including futsal and beach soccer, and runs until December 31, 2030.

=== Central America ===
In September 2022, the Panamanian Football Federation (FEPAFUT) announced a sponsorship agreement with Reebok, set to run from January 2023 through December 2026. Under the terms of the partnership, Reebok provides official match kits, training apparel, and camp gear for all national football teams, including the men's and women's squads across all age categories, as well as the national futsal and beach soccer teams. This agreement marked Reebok's return as a sponsor of FEPAFUT, having previously partnered with the federation between 1996 and 1997.

=== Europe ===
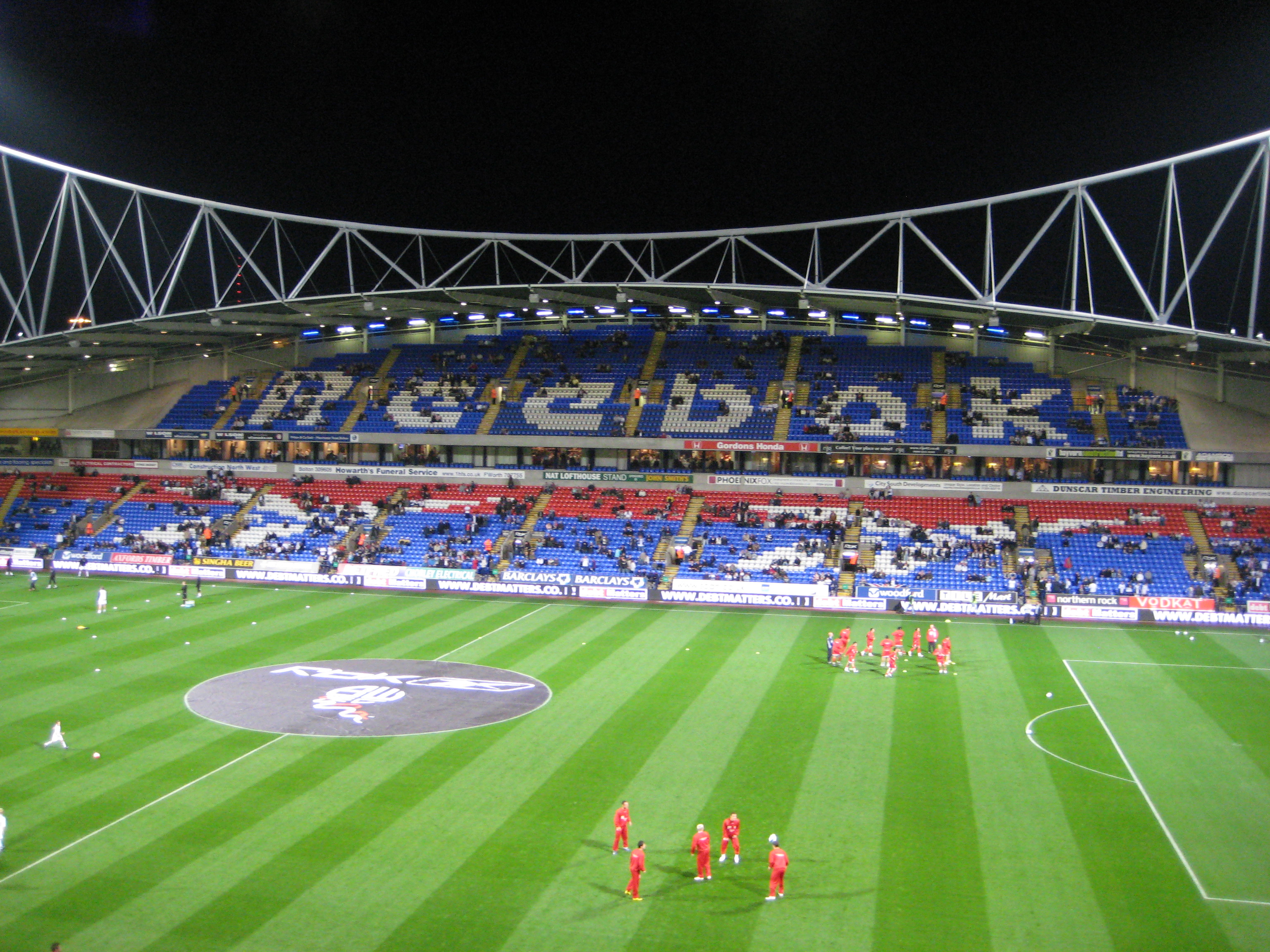
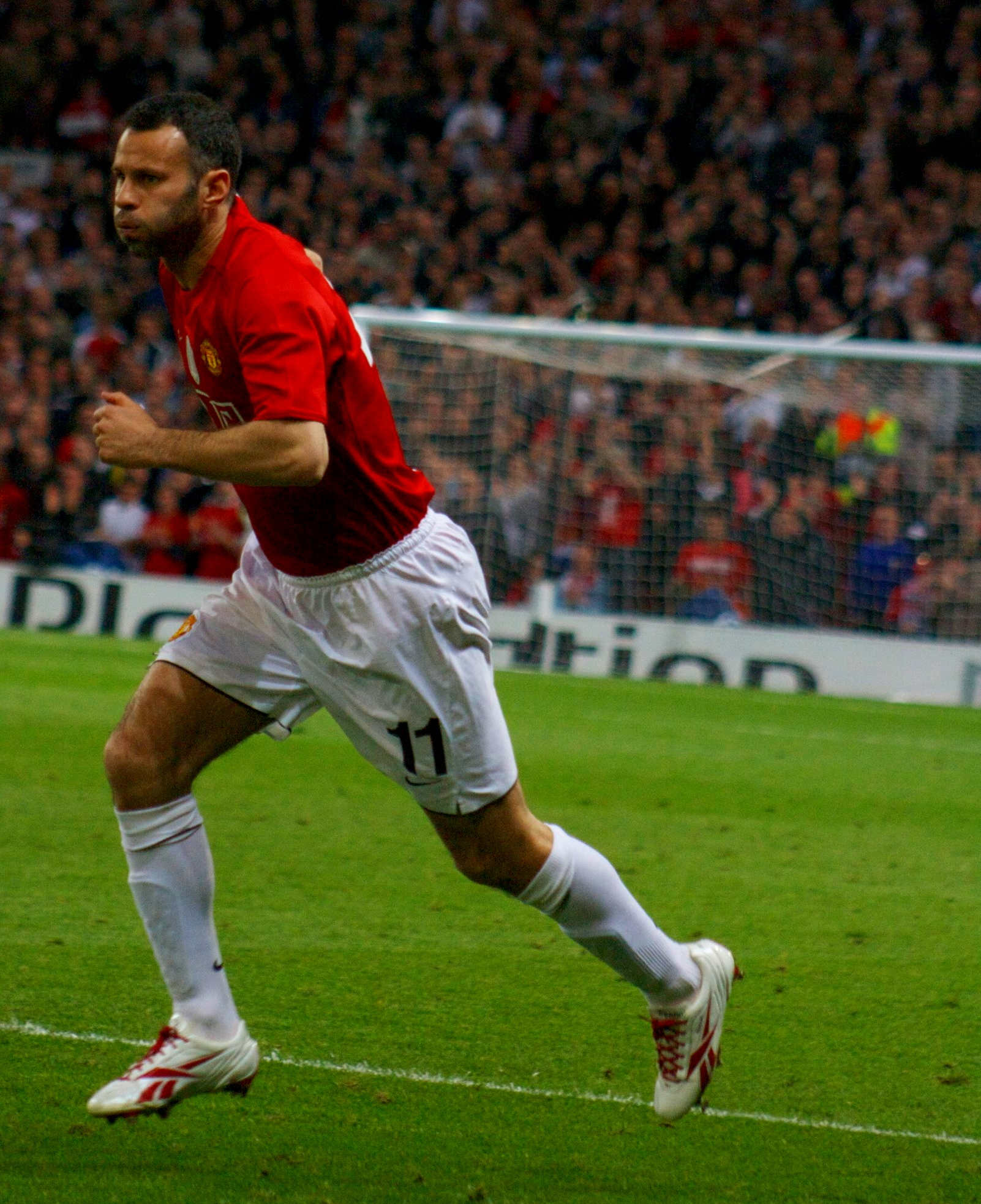
(Left): The Reebok logo on the seating of what was then Reebok Stadium (now Toughsheet Community Stadium) in the founder's home town of Bolton, England; (right): Ryan Giggs in his Reebok Sprintfit football boots. The former Manchester United winger signed an endorsement with Reebok in the early 1990s.

The company maintained its relationship with its origins in England through a long-term sponsorship deal with Bolton Wanderers, a Championship football club, however, in 2009, Bolton changed their sponsorship to 188bet. When the team moved to a brand new ground in the late-1990s, their new home was named the Reebok Stadium.

Several other English clubs, such as Liverpool F.C., had Reebok sponsorship deals up until the purchase by Adidas, but most have since switched to either the parent brand (which has a long history in football) or another company altogether. In April 2014, Bolton Wanderers officially announced the Reebok Stadium would be officially rebranded in a new sponsorship deal with sportswear manufacturer Macron, who will manufacture the club's kits and sponsor the stadium under the name Macron Stadium in a four-year deal announced by the club's chairman, Phil Gartside. In Germany, Reebok endorsed football club 1. FC Köln between 2008 and 2012.

In rugby union, Reebok sponsored the Wales national team until late 2008, who won the Grand Slam in the Six Nations Championship in that year, and the Tasman Makos in New Zealand's domestic competition, the Air New Zealand Cup.

Reebok have several sponsorship deals with European basketball teams, including Hapoel Tel Aviv BC of the Israeli Basketball Premier League and the EuroCup Basketball

In 2006, Arsenal and France national team striker Thierry Henry signed a deal to join the "I Am What I Am" campaign on August 1, 2006. Manchester United winger Ryan Giggs has also featured in "I Am What I Am" commercials. Andriy Shevchenko started his endorsement deal with the company in 2006.

In fall 2024, it was announced that Reebok would be the kit sponsor for Leigh Leopards Rugby League team in the UK Betfred Super League for the 2025 season. Leigh is eight miles south of Bolton, the origins of the brand.

In a controversial move, Reebok signed a kit sponsorship deal with the Israeli national team in 2025.

In March 2026, Reebok announced a long-term partnership with Serbian footballer Dušan Vlahović, naming him the global ambassador for Reebok Football. The partnership coincides with the debut of the Reebok Sidewinder, the brand's new on-field football boot, marking Reebok's return to the football footwear market.

Shortly after, Chelsea defender Trevoh Chalobah was announced as the brand's second signing, further strengthening Reebok's presence in elite European football.

In May 2026, Reebok announced a partnership with Polish professional tennis player Magdalena Fręch, signing her ahead of the French Open to coincide with the brand's return to performance tennis and the launch of the new Reebok Phase Evo tennis shoe.

=== Russia ===
In February 2019, the Russian Instagram version of a global Reebok advertising campaign to promote female empowerment under the hashtag #BeMoreHuman featured the slogan "Sit not on the needle of men's approval – sit on men's face." After facing outrage on social media, Reebok removed the slogan and their Russian marketing director resigned.

On March 21, 2022, Reebok suspended all branded stores and e-commerce operations in Russia after Russia's invasion of Ukraine.

On May 30, 2023, it was reported that the business of Reebok in the Russian Federation was transferred to Turkish FLO Retailing and was rebranded to "SneakerBox". FLO Retailing has been cited to make Reebok-branded product manufacturing in Turkish factories for a number of countries. Reebok merchandise is publicly available on the Sneakerbox website in Russia.

After Reebok (Nike, Adidas, Puma) leaves Russia, sneakers and goods enter the country through parallel imports or counterfeit products are produced.

=== North America ===
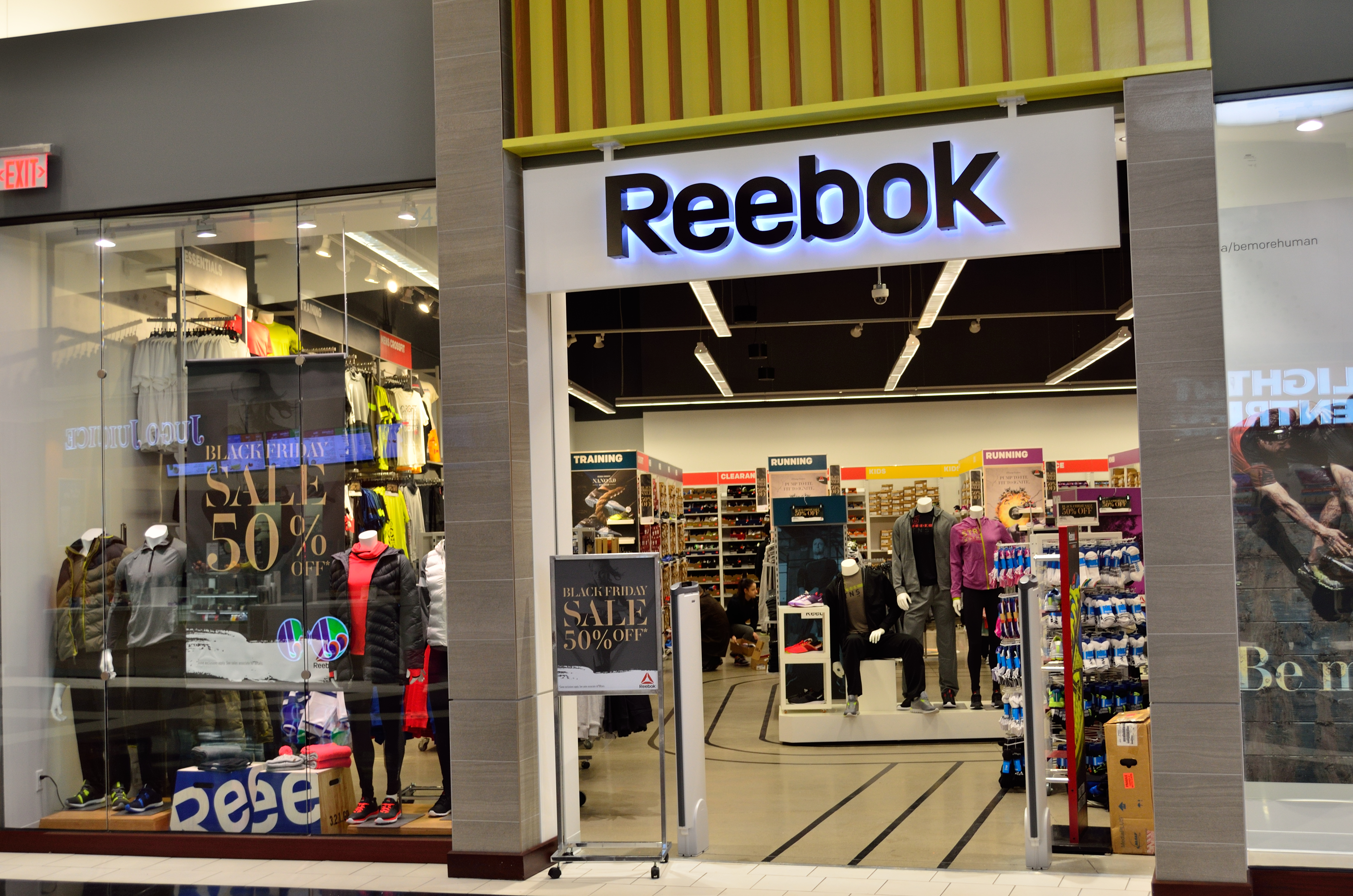
Reebok store in North America

In 2004, Reebok entered into a deal that allows them the rights to manufacture Canadian Football League (CFL) onfield jerseys, sideline gear and footwear; this deal ended in 2015.

In Mexico, Reebok was kit provider of Chivas de Guadalajara before the team was taken over by parent company Adidas in 2011.

In 2025, Reebok appointed Mexican footballer Kevin Álvarez as brand ambassador to strengthen the brand's connection with young football fans.

In September 2025, Reebok announced an official kit sponsorship deal with Club Tijuana Xolos of Liga MX. Beginning with the Torneo Clausura 2026, Reebok took on responsibility for designing the club's home, away, and alternate kits, with three pricing tiers introduced to improve accessibility for supporters.

==== United States ====
Reebok shoes were featured as product placement advertising on the Nickelodeon game show Double Dare in the 1980s. Reebok product placement was used for a gag in the Super Mario Bros. live-action film, where the soles of a Bob-omb's feet are printed with the brand logo.

Reebok signed Venus Williams after she won singles titles at Wimbledon and the 2000 Summer Olympics. From 2002 to 2012, the company held the exclusive rights to manufacture and market both authentic and replica uniform jerseys, sideline clothing and caps, and onfield football footwear (marketed as NFL Equipment) of the teams of the National Football League (NFL). It hired filmmaker Errol Morris to produce a series of 30-second commercials that aired during the 2006 NFL season.

In 2004, Reebok signed a four-year deal as the official shoe supplier to Major League Baseball (MLB). It became the exclusive apparel outfitter for the 29 teams in the NBA, and 16 WNBA teams for ten years beginning in the 2004–2005 season. The deal also added the Reebok vector logo to the 2004 U.S. Olympic basketball team's uniforms.

Reebok held the rights to produce the on-ice Edge Uniform System, performance clothing and training footwear of the National Hockey League (NHL) in a 10-year agreement from 2007 to 2017.

On December 2, 2014, the Ultimate Fighting Championship (UFC) announced a six-year deal with Reebok, which began in July 2015.

In July 2018, Reebok Boston Track Club announced it would be led by coach Chris Fox from Syracuse University.

Following the 2022 acquisition by Authentic, Reebok re-entered several major sports categories with new athlete signings.

In December 2024, Reebok announced a long-term partnership with two-time US Open champion Bryson DeChambeau, designating the brand as the official apparel and footwear sponsor of DeChambeau and his LIV Golf team, Crushers GC, marking Reebok's return to the performance golf category.

In 2023, Angel Reese became the first women's basketball player signed by Reebok under the brand's revived basketball division, led by Shaquille O'Neal as president and Allen Iverson as vice president. In October 2024, Reese agreed to a multi-year contract extension that included a signature shoe, making her one of a small number of active WNBA players with a signature shoe deal. Reebok subsequently signed additional WNBA players DiJonai Carrington and Lexie Brown. In October 2024, Reebok signed Virginia-native five-star prospect Nate Ament to a multi-year NIL deal, making him the first male high school basketball player to sign with the brand and one of the first high school athletes to receive Player Exclusive sneaker colorways.

In May 2025, Reebok signed Detroit-native and Arkansas Razorbacks guard Darius Acuff Jr. to an NIL deal, later expanding it into a historic signature shoe agreement, making him the first NCAA men's basketball player to receive a signature shoe deal from a major U.S. brand while still in college.

In 2025, Washington Capitals right wing Tom Wilson was announced as a Reebok ambassador, endorsing the brand's athletic footwear and off-ice training apparel as part of Reebok's return to hockey.

=== Oceania ===
In 2005, Reebok also signed an exclusive agreement to design and supply all eight team home and away strips for the new Australian A-League competition. Although not an expensive deal, this partnership paid dividends for Reebok, due to the growing popularity of football and the league in the area. An estimated 125,000 A-League jerseys were sold in Australia, a record for a single league's sales in a year for a sports manufacturer. Reebok's agreement ended at the finish of the 2010–11 season. On September 29, 2022, it announced a partnership with the National Basketball League (NBL) as the official footwear partner for the 2022–23 season.

=== South America ===
Reebok was the uniform provider for Brazilian clubs Cruzeiro, Vasco, International and São Paulo FC; Argentine club Banfield; Paraguayan club General Díaz, and Uruguayan club Peñarol. Reebok also sponsored several national teams in the late 90s and early 2000s, such as Argentina, Chile, Colombia, and Paraguay.

In November 2022, the company announced its return to the football stage, signing a new deal with Brazilian club Botafogo. In January 2025, Chilean club Unión Española announced a new deal with Reebok.

=== Non-sport related endorsements ===
New York rapper Jay-Z became the first non-athlete to get a signature shoe from Reebok. The "S. Carter Collection by Rbk" was launched on November 21, 2002, and the S. Carter sneaker became the fastest-selling shoe in the company's history. Later, Reebok also made a deal with another New York-based rapper 50 Cent to release a line of G-Unit sneakers, as well as St. Louis-based rapper Nelly and Israeli violinist Miri Ben-Ari have become spokespersons for the company. Reebok also signed actress Scarlett Johansson and introduced her own line of clothing and footwear called Scarlett Hearts, part of the Rbk Lifestyle Collection. The company also produces shoes for Emporio Armani under the label EA7. Other high-profile entertainment figures that have signed endorsement agreements with Reebok over the years include Ariana Grande, Gal Gadot, Gigi Hadid, Victoria Beckham, Cardi B, and Camille Kostek.

In June 2023, Reebok announced a long-term partnership with Puerto Rican rapper Anuel AA, encompassing product collaborations and special projects. The partnership built on prior capsule collections the two had released together, including versions of the Classic Leather and Question Mid sneaker styles.

In July 2025, Reebok named Argentine singer María Becerra as its brand ambassador in Argentina, as part of the global "Sport is Everything" campaign.

In January 2026, Reebok announced a multi-year partnership with Colombian singer Karol G, naming her a global brand ambassador and the face of the brand's "Born Classic. Worn for Life." campaign, centered on the relaunch of the Reebok Classics line. A collaborative footwear and apparel collection co-designed by Karol G is expected in 2027.

In February 2026, Reebok announced a group of European music ambassadors, including South London rapper K-Trap, German-Brazilian rapper Lucio101 from Berlin, Prince Waly from Montreuil, France, and Rondodasosa from Milan, as part of the brand's renewed focus on local cultural engagement across Europe.

== Notable collaborations ==
Reebok has collaborated with a range of fashion houses, designers, artists, and brands throughout its history to reinterpret archival silhouettes and expand its cultural presence.

=== Fashion and designer collaborations ===
Among its earliest high-profile fashion partnerships, Reebok collaborated with Chanel on the Instapump Fury, debuted at Chanel's Spring/Summer 2001 runway show in Paris in October 2000, making it one of the first collaborations between a luxury fashion house and an athletic footwear brand.

In the mid-2010s, Reebok entered a series of notable fashion collaborations. Rapper Kendrick Lamar partnered with the brand beginning in December 2014, releasing multiple iterations of the Ventilator and Classic Leather sneakers, with designs themed around unity between rival gangs in his hometown of Compton. Palace Skateboards and Russian designer Gosha Rubchinskiy both collaborated with Reebok in 2016. Beginning in 2016, designer Demna Gvasalia's label Vetements collaborated with Reebok on a series of reworked Instapump Fury silhouettes, producing releases across multiple seasons through 2020.

New York fashion label Pyer Moss, led by designer Kerby Jean-Raymond, entered a multi-year collaboration with Reebok beginning in 2017, with the first public collection debuting at New York Fashion Week in February 2018. The partnership produced four collections of footwear and apparel, concluding with Collection 4 in November 2022, and was named Footwear News Collaboration of the Year in 2018.

Victoria Beckham announced a partnership with Reebok in 2017, releasing an initial capsule collection in July 2018 drawing on the brand's basketball heritage and archival designs, followed by a second collaboration in 2019.

Maison Margiela has collaborated with Reebok on multiple occasions, beginning with a runway presentation in January 2020 featuring a reworked Instapump Fury with a split Tabi toe and block heel. Subsequent collaborations included the Classic Leather Tabi in 2021, reinterpreted with Margiela's hand-painted décortiqué technique, and a further reworking of the TZ Pump in 2022.

In December 2022, New York-based designer and former Reebok graphic designer Nicole McLaughlin released a collaboration with Reebok on the Club C Geo Mid, combining archival references from the 1996 Reebok Etna Mid with outdoor-inspired materials including ripstop nylon and reflective binding.

Eames Office, the design studio founded by Charles and Ray Eames, collaborated with Reebok on a series of three footwear collections, concluding with a final release in late 2023 that reinterpreted the Classic Nylon, Instapump Fury, and Beatnik silhouettes with references to the Eames archive of furniture and toy designs.

Japanese label noir kei ninomiya, a division of Comme des Garçons led by designer Kei Ninomiya, debuted a collaboration with Reebok at Paris Fashion Week Fall/Winter 2024, reimagining the Instapump Fury with three-dimensional floral embellishments and silver detailing.

Los Angeles-based design studio HYMNE, founded by designer Jide Osifeso, released its first collaboration with Reebok in Spring 2024, followed by a second collection in May 2025 reworking the Classic Nylon Plus and Club C Revenge silhouettes.

In April 2026, Swiss luxury watchmaker H. Moser & Cie. unveiled the Streamliner Pump at Watches & Wonders 2026, a limited-edition mechanical watch developed in collaboration with Reebok. The watch reinterprets the pneumatic inflation mechanism of Reebok's iconic Pump sneaker, first introduced in 1989, as a winding mechanism for the watch movement. The collaboration was limited to 250 pieces per variant, each accompanied by an exclusive co-branded sneaker.

=== Streetwear collaborations ===
Pharrell Williams' streetwear label Billionaire Boys Club (BBC) and its Ice Cream sublabel first collaborated with Reebok in 2004 on the Flavour sneaker, one of the earliest high-profile streetwear and athletic footwear collaborations of its kind. Following a hiatus, the partnership resumed in 2019, producing further releases across the Question, Answer, BB 4000, Instapump Fury, and Board Flip silhouettes through the 2020s.

Japanese streetwear label A Bathing Ape (BAPE) has collaborated with Reebok on multiple occasions, beginning in December 2020 with a limited Club C release, and continuing with further Instapump Fury and Club C 85 releases through 2022.

Montreal-based design label JJJJound has collaborated with Reebok on multiple occasions since October 2020, across the Club C, Classic Nylon, and NPC II silhouettes, with releases continuing through 2023.

=== Pop culture collaborations ===
Reebok has released a series of licensed pop culture collaborations spanning film, television, and entertainment franchises. The brand's relationship with the Alien franchise dates to 1986, when Reebok produced the Alien Stomper footwear in connection with the film Aliens, with subsequent anniversary releases continuing through the 2020s. Reebok released multiple collections tied to the Ghostbusters franchise, beginning in 2020 with the Ghost Smashers and Classic Leather, and continuing with a second collection tied to Ghostbusters: Afterlife in 2021. Reebok collaborated with Mighty Morphin Power Rangers on two collections, the first in 2021 featuring the Rangers and a second in 2022 featuring the show's villains.

In July 2021, Reebok released a collaboration with Universal Brand Development tied to the Jurassic Park franchise, featuring eight sneaker silhouettes themed around characters, creatures, and props from the 1993 film, alongside a matching apparel collection. A follow-up collection tied to Jurassic World: Dominion released in 2022. A Looney Tunes collection released in May 2022 featured seven sneakers each representing a different character from the franchise.

In December 2022, Reebok released a Street Fighter collection with Japanese video game developer Capcom marking the franchise's 35th anniversary, featuring multiple footwear silhouettes each referencing a specific character or element from the game, alongside a matching apparel line. Also in December 2022, Reebok released a DC Comics collection featuring six sneakers inspired by Superman, Batman, Wonder Woman, Lex Luthor, The Joker, and Harley Quinn.

In December 2023, Reebok released a Harry Potter collection in partnership with Warner Bros., featuring four silhouettes — the Club C 85, Classic Leather, Classic Leather Hexalite, and Instapump Fury — each themed around characters and elements from the franchise, alongside a matching apparel line.

== Charitable work ==
The Reebok Foundation operates the "Build Our Kids' Success" (BOKS) program to provide US schoolchildren with physical activities before the school day. Reebok funds the program with direct grants and by contributing a percentage of shoe sales.

== Criticism and controversies ==
Reebok has faced criticism regarding its sponsorship of Israeli sports organizations and labor conditions in its international supply chain.

=== Israel and Palestinian territories ===
In 2016, Reebok faced international backlash after announcing a special edition sneaker to commemorate Israel's 68th Independence Day. Following calls for a boycott from activists who argued the shoe celebrated the displacement of Palestinians, the company canceled the release, stating the design was a one-off initiative by a local partner and not an official brand product.

In February 2025, Reebok signed a two-year sponsorship deal with the Israel Football Association (IFA). The move drew criticism from the Boycott, Divestment and Sanctions (BDS) movement, which has campaigned against IFA sponsors since 2018 because the association includes clubs based in Israeli settlements in the West Bank. In late 2025, reports indicated that Reebok sought to remove its logo from team kits following boycott pressure, though the company later clarified its continued support for the partnership.

=== Labor conditions in Asia ===
The company has been criticized for labor rights violations in its Asian supplier factories. Independent monitors, such as China Labor Watch, have documented issues in Reebok-contracted facilities including excessive overtime, wages below the legal minimum, and inadequate safety measures.

Academic research published in the Journal of Business Ethics has noted that while Reebok implemented a corporate code of conduct, the pressure for low-cost production often led to a "race to the legal minimum," where factory improvements were undermined by increased work intensity and the lack of independent labor representation.
