= Reebok Classic =

Lifestyle shoe brand by Reebok

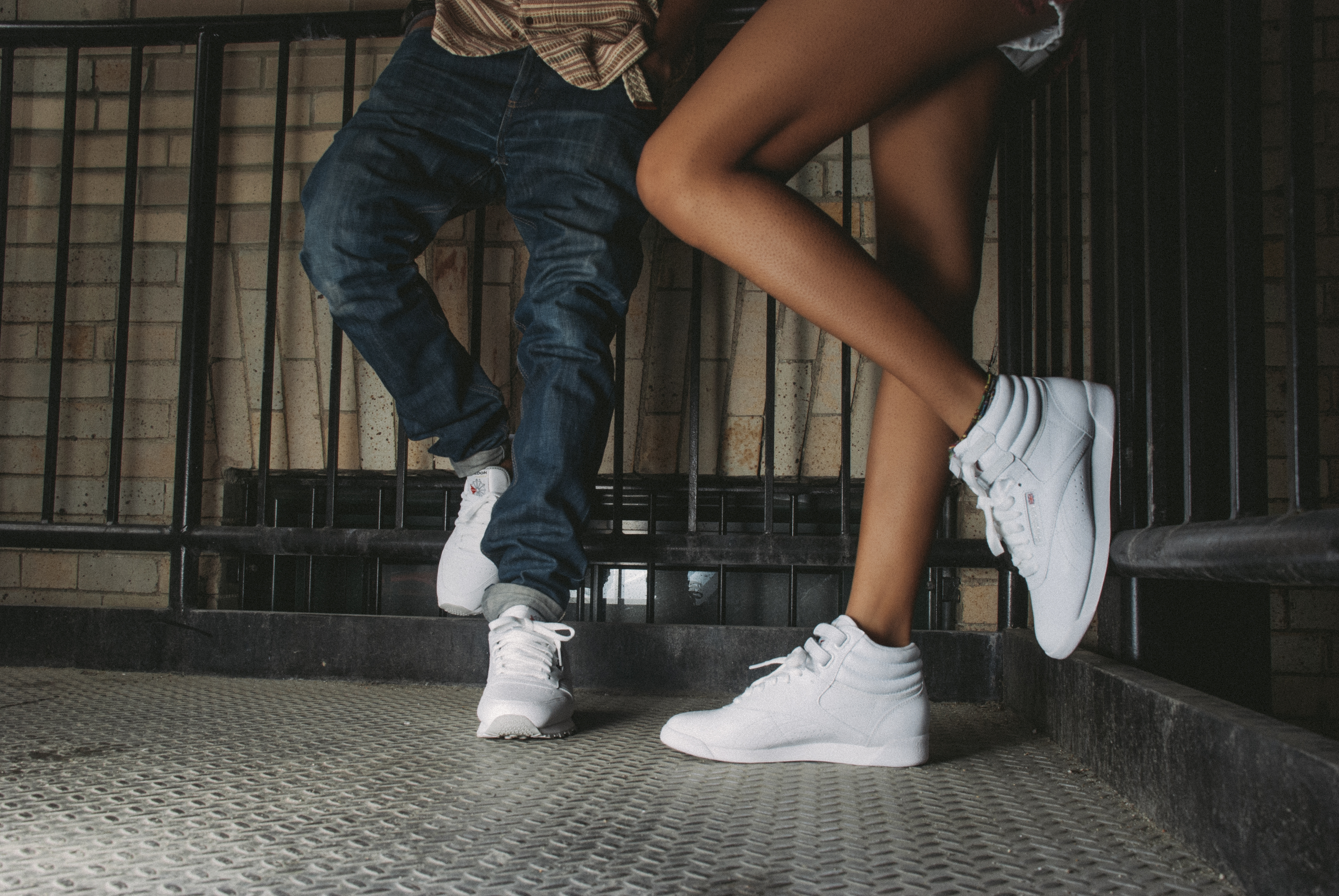
- Product type: Footwear
- Current owner: Reebok
- Country: United States
- Introduced: 1983; 43 years ago
- Markets: Worldwide

Reebok Classic is a lifestyle shoe brand that consists of athletic shoes that became popular casual wear. The brand evolved from the Classic Leather, the Workout, the Ex-O-Fit, the Newport Classic and the Freestyle. Reebok Classic also includes Retro Running, Retro Basketball, InstaPump Fury and contemporary styles.

== Product history ==
=== Franchise 5 ===
In 1982, the Freestyle, the first athletic shoe designed for women, was introduced. The shoe popularized the aerobic exercise movement, encouraged women to participate in sports and began the acceptance of athletic footwear as street and casual wear. In 1983, Reebok launched the Classic Leather, a running shoe. It gained popularity as casual wear because of its simple design in comparison to the technical running footwear designs that followed the Classic Leather's release. A print advertisement showing a couple on a motorcycle with the tag line "You've Arrived" was created for the shoe. That year, the Newport Classic (NPC) and Ex-O-Fit were launched. The Ex-O-Fit was similar to the Freestyle, but designed for men. In 1985, the Workout was launched as a cross-training shoe. The shoe's simple look made it popular as casual wear.

=== Retro Running ===
Reebok Classic established the Retro Running line to re-introduce popular shoe styles from the past. The GL 6000 was a lightweight running and training shoe created to provide maximum stability. The shoe was first released in 1986 and has been re-released to honor the shoe's history and illustrate its timeless appeal. In 1990, the Ventilator, a lightweight flexible running shoe, was launched. The Ventilator's versatility made the shoe popular. Reebok Classic re-released the Ventilator "Tonal Ballistic" and "Heritage" limited edition packs in 2014. The DMX Run was launched in 1997. The shoe debuted Reebok's DMX technology, a system in which air runs through connected pods and releases energy. DMX was later used in Allen Iverson's second shoe. Reebok Classic re-released the shoe for the first time in October 2012.

=== Retro Basketball ===
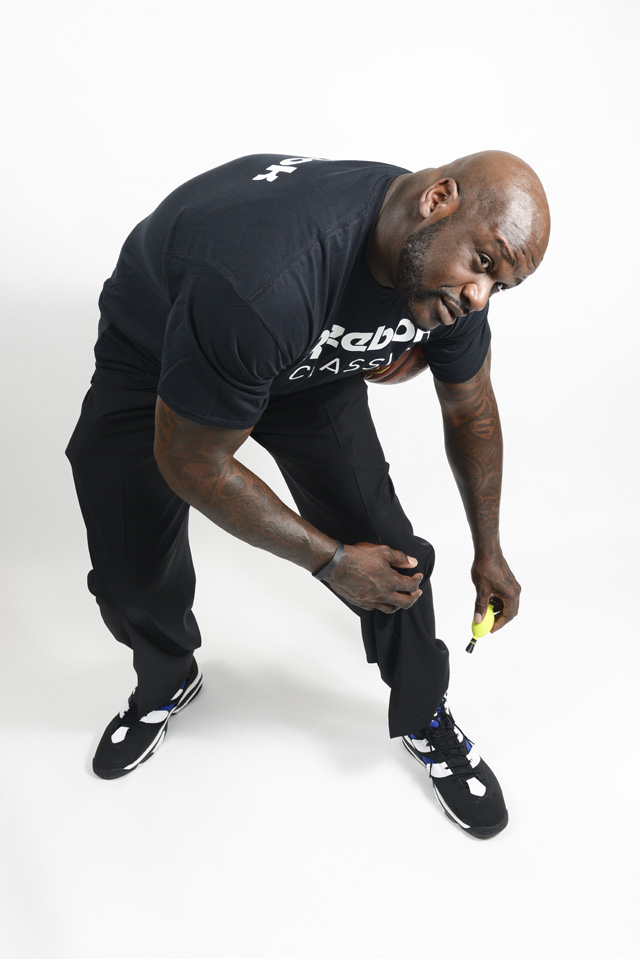
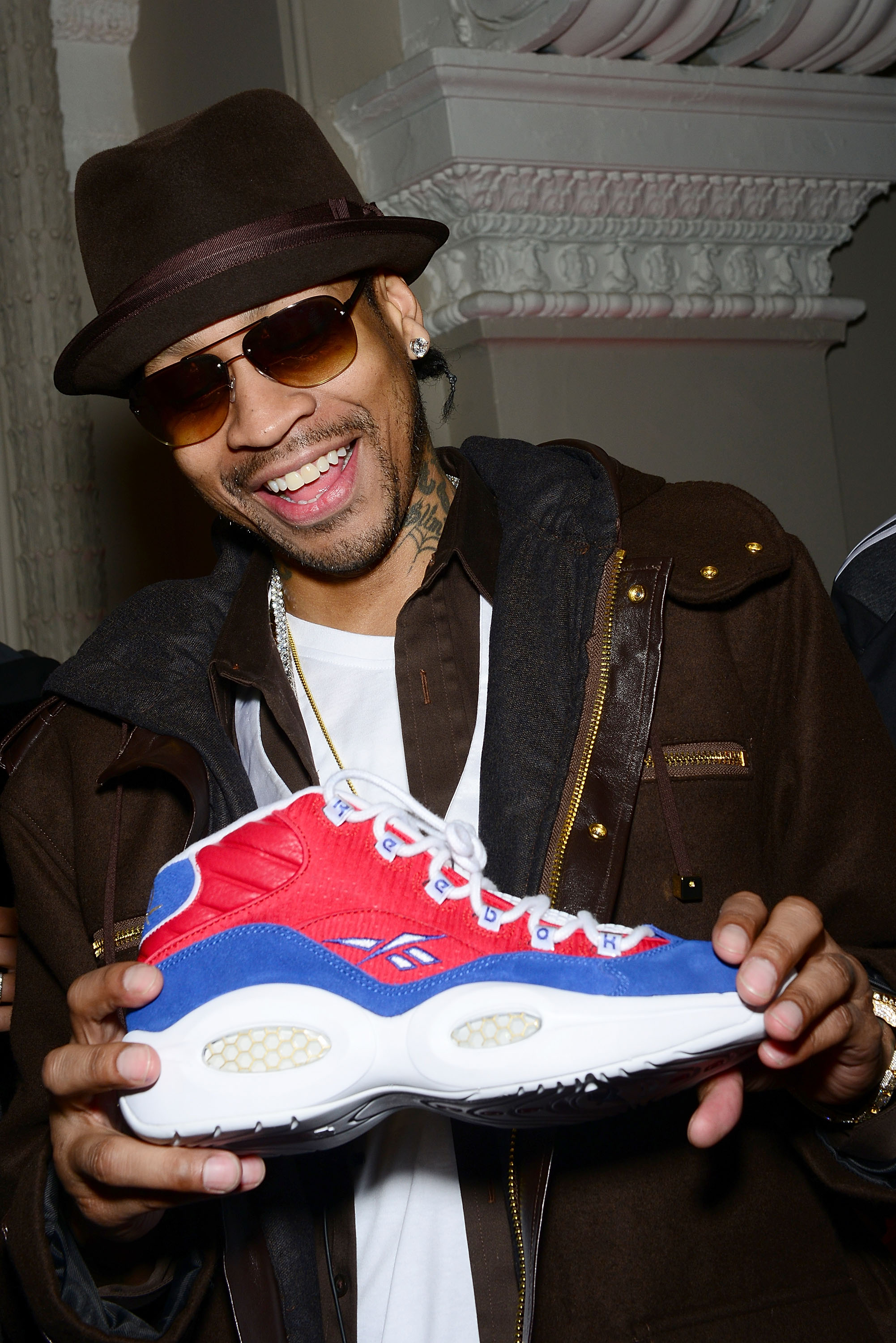
Two notable basketball players with Reebok Classics: (left) Shaquille O'Neal (with a pair of Shaq Attaq IV) and Allen Iverson (right, holding his Reebok Question signature shoe)

The Reebok Pump was introduced as a basketball shoe in 1989. It was the first shoe to have an internal inflation mechanism designed to provide a customized fit. Over a four-year period the shoe sold over 20 million pairs worldwide. In 1992, the Shaq Attaq was released during the NBA season. It was Shaquille O'Neal's first signature shoe and the first official shoe for a Reebok athlete. The shoe gained popularity because it was featured on basketball cards, video games, Pepsi commercials and movies. The retro version of the Shaq Attaq was released in April 2013. The Reebok Kamikaze, Shawn Kemp's signature line, was launched in 1995. That year, the Shaqnosis was launched. The shoe was worn by Will Smith in Men in Black. In 1996, the Reebok Question Mid, Allen Iverson's signature shoe, was launched. The shoe became popular because it was clean and wearable. Iverson's fan-base also attributed to the Reebok Question Mid's popularity.

=== InstaPump Fury ===
The InstaPump Fury was released in 1994. The shoe was lace-less and featured Reebok's pump technology, a reduced midsole, Hexalite cushioning and a fully synthetic upper. That year, Steven Tyler wore the shoe during a performance at the 1994 MTV Video Music Awards. The shoe was inducted into the Design Museum of London. It has received numerous re-releases and new colorways.

== In pop culture ==
Alicia Keys, Kendrick Lamar, 50 Cent, Jay-Z, Travi$ Scott, Mike Skinner (musician) and Kid Ink have collaborated with Reebok Classic. Swizz Beatz, a hip-hop recording artist and producer, was the creative director of Reebok as of 2013.
