= Reebok advertising campaigns =

Overview of notable advertising campaigns by Reebok

Reebok International Limited is a global producer of athletic footwear, apparel, and accessories; and was a subsidiary of Adidas since 2005, until it was sold to Authentic Brands Group in 2021. Reebok has marketed itself using a variety of ad campaigns.

== Terry Tate: Office Linebacker ==
This campaign featured a fictional character, Terry Tate (nicknamed the "Office Linebacker"), who promoting office etiquette while wearing the products being advertised.

The campaign was named the "Cannes Lions International Advertising Festival Golden Lion Award" winner, "Best Actor in a TV Commercial" and "Ten Most Liked and Downloaded Ads of 2003" by Advertising Age and "Most Likeable Ad of 2003" by [USA Today].

== I Am What I Am ==
This campaign featured musicians Jay-Z, Nelly, Daddy Yankee, and 50 Cent; athletes Allen Iverson, Donovan McNabb, Curt Schilling, Kelly Holmes, Iker Casillas, and Yao Ming; actors Lucy Liu, John Leguizamo and Christina Ricci; and skateboarder Stevie Williams.

In 2010, Reebok's "I Am What I Am" Campaign was repeated, aimed at the 15-20 age group. Celebrities featured in the ad campaign were under 20, including ice hockey player John Tavares, footballers Matthew Stafford and Andre Smith as well as basketball player Derrick Rose.

== Run easy ==
This campaign referred to social and fun aspects of running.

== There Are Two People in Everyone ==
"Two People in Everyone" is a marketing campaign that expands on the Run Easy theme.

== Goku's power ==
This campaign featured basketball player Yao Ming.

== Reebok Nation ==
During the 2007 World Series, Reebok aired a 30-second local TV advertisement featuring Reebok's ties to Boston sports.

== Framed ==
Carat/MY Entertainment and Roadside Entertainment worked on this campaign where Hollywood actors presented half-hour biographical pieces with athletes. Pairings included NBA All-Star Baron Davis "framed" and TV and film actor Emmanuelle Chriqui, basketball player Allen Iverson and musician Nelly, football player Thierry Henry and actress Paz Vega, the NFL's 2006 "Rookie of the Year" Vince Young and actress Regina King, and 2007 World Series winning baseball player David Ortiz and comedian Carlos Mencia.

== Your Move ==
The Your Move global marketing campaign ran in 2008 online, on TV, billboards, print, and PR. It featured Thierry Henry, Jelena Janković, MS Dhoni and Alexander Ovechkin.

== Lose the Beer Belly ==
In 2000, Reebok released a television advertisement in the UK that saw a man running away from a threatening giant human belly which was chasing him around a built-up area, with the repeated doom-laden voice over of "Belly's gonna get ya". It was voted 10th best advert of all time by ITV on their 2005 program ITV's Best Ever Ads 2.

== Dan & Dave ==
Dan & Dave was an advertising and merchandising campaign during the build-up to the 1992 Summer Olympics in Barcelona. The promotion was meant to generate excitement and support for the Olympic competition between American decathletes Dan O'Brien and Dave Johnson.
