= Drac's Night Out =

- Tentative box art for Drac's Night Out.
- Developer: Microsmiths
- Publisher: Parker Brothers
- Platform: Nintendo Entertainment System
- Release: Unreleased
- Genre: Action
- Mode: Single-player

Drac's Night Out is an unreleased video game for the Nintendo Entertainment System. The game was developed by Mark Lesser and Rex Bradford of Microsmiths, and features a prominent Reebok Pump shoe sponsorship.

== Gameplay ==
In the game, the player controls Count Dracula who, while wearing Reebok Pumps, has to first work his way down his castle while avoiding the hostile villagers. This could be accomplished by hypnotizing the villagers with his vampiric gaze, or by pulling a lever to spring one of many Rube Goldberg-esque hidden traps. Once villagers are subdued, Dracula can then suck their blood and briefly turn into a bat to navigate through the tower. Scattered throughout these towers are also Reebok Pump power-ups. Once activated, Dracula is given a temporary speed-boost, as well as the ability to jump over villagers and holes.

When Dracula escapes the castle, he is given a large open town to explore and search for his bride, Mina. This will require hints such as finding maps and compasses from villagers. Patrolling the streets are hostile mobs and non-hostile villagers. After sucking enough blood, Dracula temporarily transforms into an invulnerable wolf to cover distance more quickly. Dracula is also given the ability to suck the blood of sleeping villagers that will transform into Vampiresses and lead Dracula nearer to Mina's location. Some villagers drop items like keys and flowers, used to open gates and homes. Dracula can also travel through secret underground shortcuts. Once the player discovers the building housing Mina, a congratulatory picture of the pair walking together appears and leads to the next 'round'.

== Development ==
According to Mark Lesser, the Reebok Pumps sponsorship was added late in development at the request of Parker Brothers.

Drac's Night Out was set for release in 1991. The reason for the games cancellation is unknown. A prototype has since been discovered and its ROM data released to the internet.
