= Reebok Nano =

Athletic shoe manufactured by Reebok

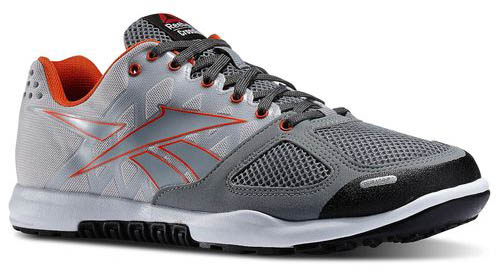
- Product type: Athletic shoe
- Current owner: Reebok
- Introduced: 2011; 15 years ago
- Markets: Worldwide
- Website: reebok.com/nano

Reebok Nano is an athletic shoe that is the first specifically designed for CrossFit. The first generation was released in 2011.

== History ==
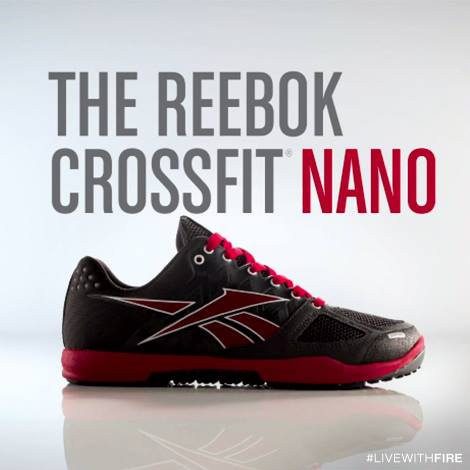
Advertisement for the Reebok Nano

In 2011, Reebok became the official provider of licensed CrossFit footwear and apparel, and released the first Reebok Nano. The shoe was designed to be used for high-impact movements, weightlifting, and short-distance running. The shoe's design includes a spacious toe box.

The following year, Nano 2.0 was released. Men's Fitness included the shoe on its list of "Workout Gear for CrossFit: 15 New Products to Improve Your Daily Workout." The shoe has a wider toe box than the first generation to allow an athlete's foot to play more naturally and maximize stability.

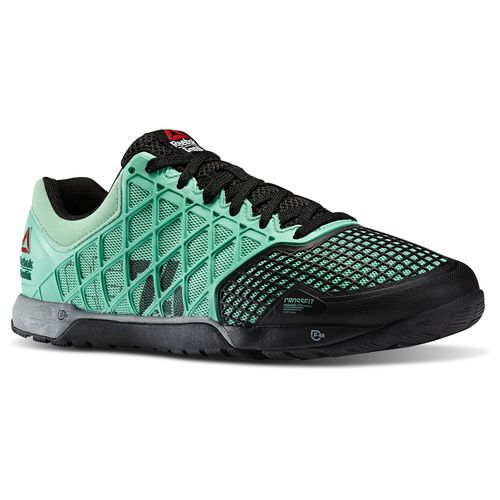
Nano 4.0

Nano 3.0 was introduced in 2013. The shoe provides forefoot cushioning and heel stabilization with its dual-density platform. The shoe has a protective layer in its midsole to prevent fraying caused by rope climbs and features a wide toe box and midsole to provide stability during lifts. The Nano 3.0 introduced "Dura-Cage" construction for additional protection and lightweight support.

The fourth generation of the shoe was introduced during the 2014 CrossFit Games. The front of the shoe has a protection layer and enhanced toe-wrap for durability. It also features a rigid sole that provides more grip and stability than previous Nano models.

The fifth generation of the shoe was introduced in 2015 and is wrapped in Kevlar. It boasts of a newly engineered anatomical heel counter and footbed, with an R55 platform for additional high rebound and cushioning.
