= Kevin Álvarez =

Kevin Álvarez may refer to:

- Kevin Álvarez (footballer, born 1996), Honduran football right-back
- Kevin Álvarez (footballer, born 1999), Mexican football right-back
- Kevin Alvarez (baseball), baseball player
