= Avia (shoes) =

American shoe company

- Logo since 1983
- Industry: Shoes, activewear, wearable technology
- Founded: 1979; 47 years ago
- Founders: Jerry Stubblefield; Don Stubblefield
- Headquarters: Beaverton, Oregon, U.S.
- Parent: Galaxy Universal
- Website: avia.com

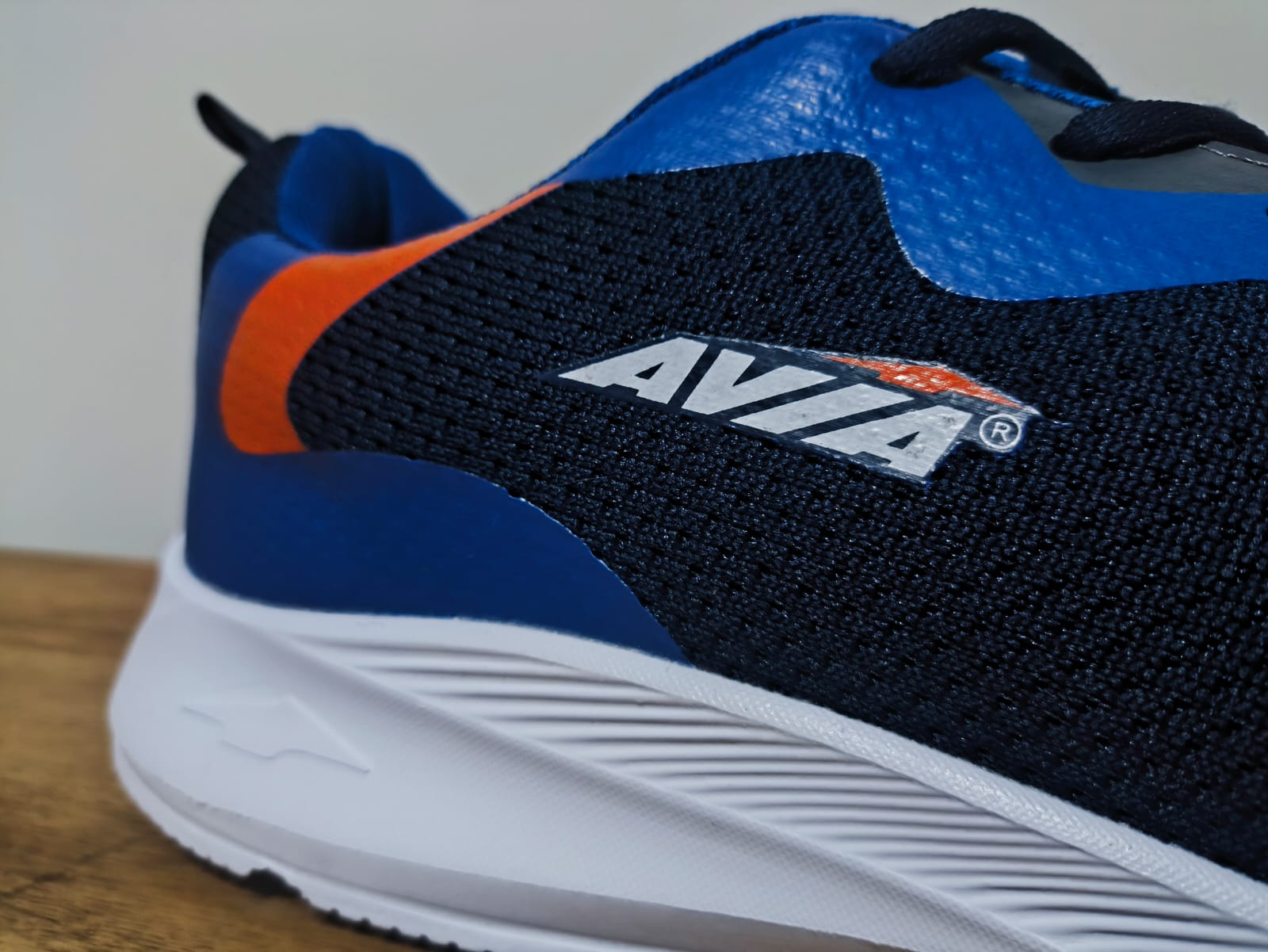
A blue Avia sneaker in a close view.

Avia (/ˈeɪ.vi.ə/, AY-vee-ə) is an American footwear and clothing company that specializes in running, yoga and lifestyle activewear, shoes and accessories. Avia was founded in 1979 by Jerry Stubblefield, and is currently a subsidiary of Galaxy Universal.

== History ==
Avia was founded in Oregon in 1979 by Jerry Stubblefield. Stubblefield reportedly came up with the word "avia" (derived from the Latin "avis", meaning "bird") while on a jet flight, and decided to use it as a brand name for a sports shoe to suggest aviation. The father-and-son tandem created designs such as the widely imitated cantilever sole, which helped make Avia an industry leader. In 1987, Avia was acquired by Reebok for $180 million, which later sold it to the American Sporting Goods Corporation in the later-1990s. Avia was then acquired by the Sequential Brands Group in the Galaxy Brands deal in 2014.

On August 31, 2021, Avia's parent company, Sequential Brands, filed for Chapter 11 bankruptcy protection. In September 2021, Avia was acquired by Galaxy Universal.

== Products ==
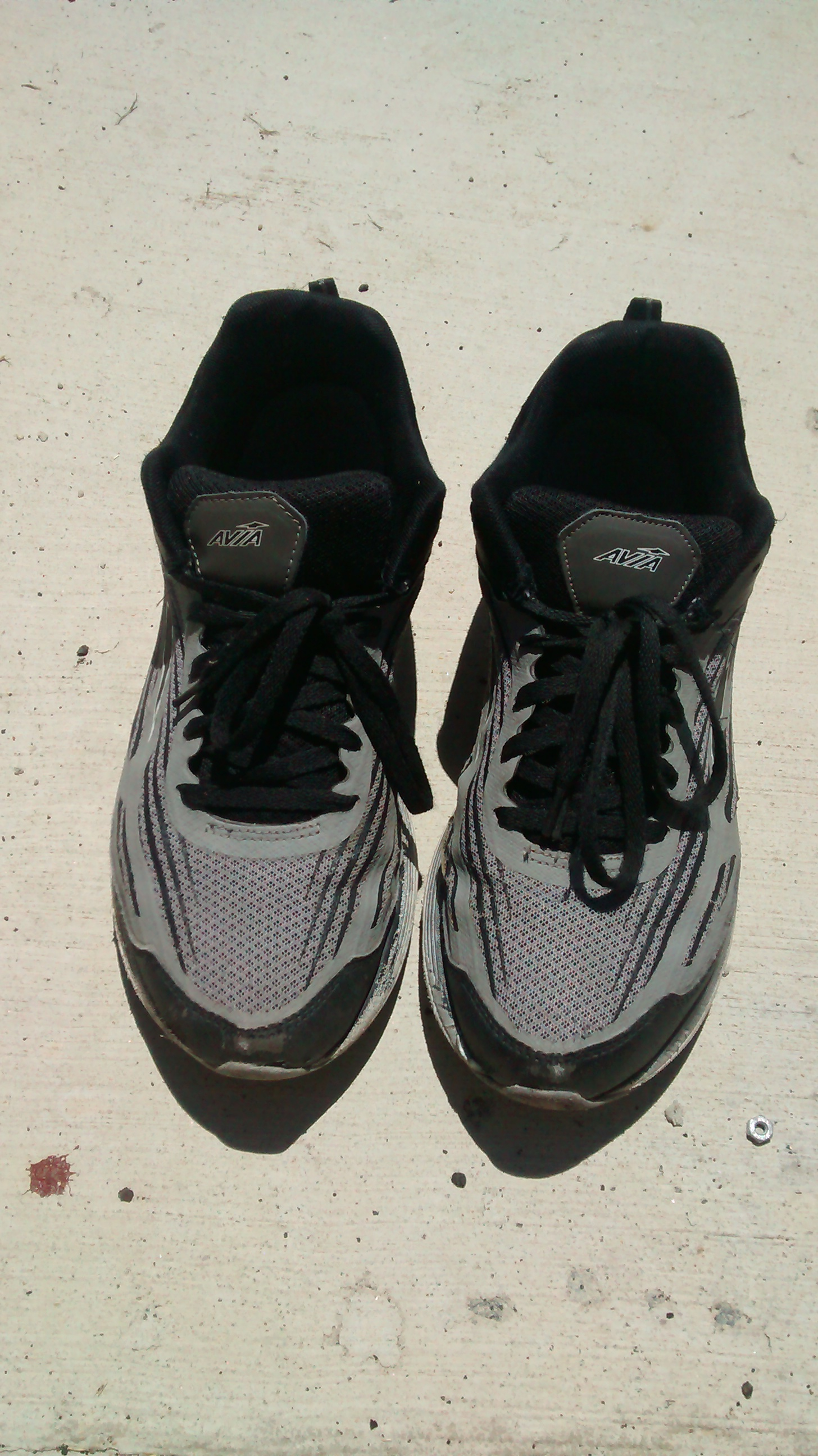
A pair of black and gray Avia shoes.

Avia made its name as a leading brand in the 1980s for its line of women's walking and aerobics shoes, as well as men's shoes. In the late 1980s and early 1990s, Avia had a thriving line of basketball shoes; among those who wore Avia were Scottie Pippen, John Stockton, John Salley, A. C. Green, Clyde Drexler and Robert Parish. Avia shoes are known for their performance, durability and comfort.

The company is also known for some of the performance technologies built into their shoes, including the Cantilever Heel (heel support), the ARC – Anatomical Rebound Cradle (comprehensive foot cushioning and arch support), and Avia's FOM technology (shock compression).

In 1991, Avia filed a lawsuit against Nike, alleging that Nike's ''Air 180'' and ''Air Force 180'' running and basketball shoes infringed upon Avia patents. Avia accused Nike of pirating its ''Cantilever'' technology, which uses a cushion to provide shock absorption and stability. The company contended the technology has been the basis of its products since Avia was founded in 1980. Avia widened the suit in January 1992 and settled in December 1992.

Avia introduced its line of performance and lifestyle activewear in 2013, building upon its continued success within the active category, and later came out with wearable technology in 2015.

=== Basketball ===
Avia created many variants of basketball shoes in the 1980s and 1990s. The name for these shoes was the Avia 800 Series. Sponsored national teams include Finland from 2020 to 2023.
