= Reebok Ventilator =

Line of sport shoes by Reebok

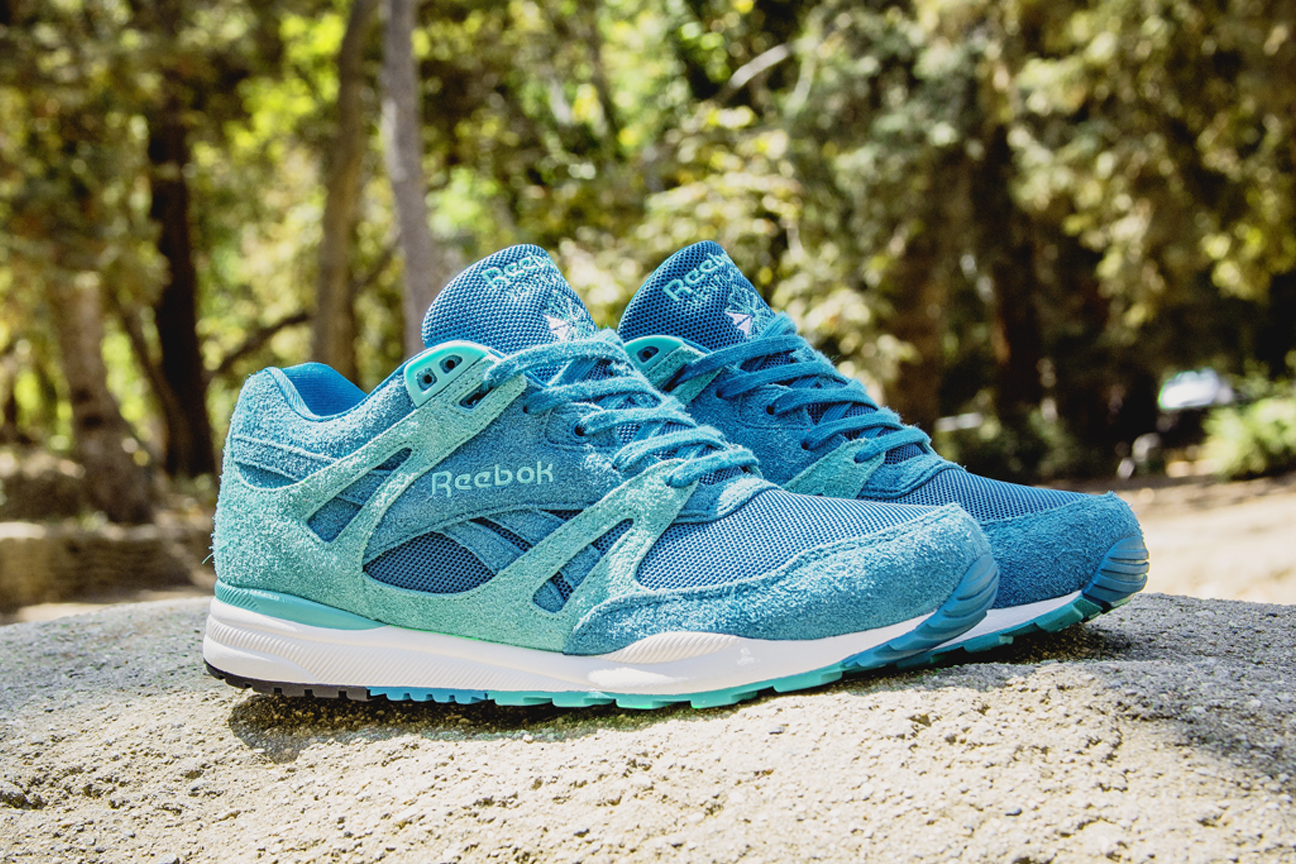
- Ventilator Heritage Pack
- Product type: Athletic footwear
- Current owner: Reebok
- Country: United States
- Introduced: 1990; 36 years ago
- Markets: Worldwide

Reebok Ventilator is a line of athletic shoes by Reebok. The footwear was first introduced in 1990 as a lightweight sneaker with vented side panels. The Ventilators focused on "breathability" with bold colored silhouette. Originally popular in the '90s, the Reebok Ventilator has been released in different styles throughout the years and is still in production.

== Styles ==
The Reebok Ventilator debuted in 1990 with new footwear technology that promoted airflow. In 1991, the Ventilator Supreme was released as a follow-up to the original shoe. The design differed in that the Supreme iteration's thermoplastic polyurethane (TPU) support extended all the way from the arch to the heel for better motion control.

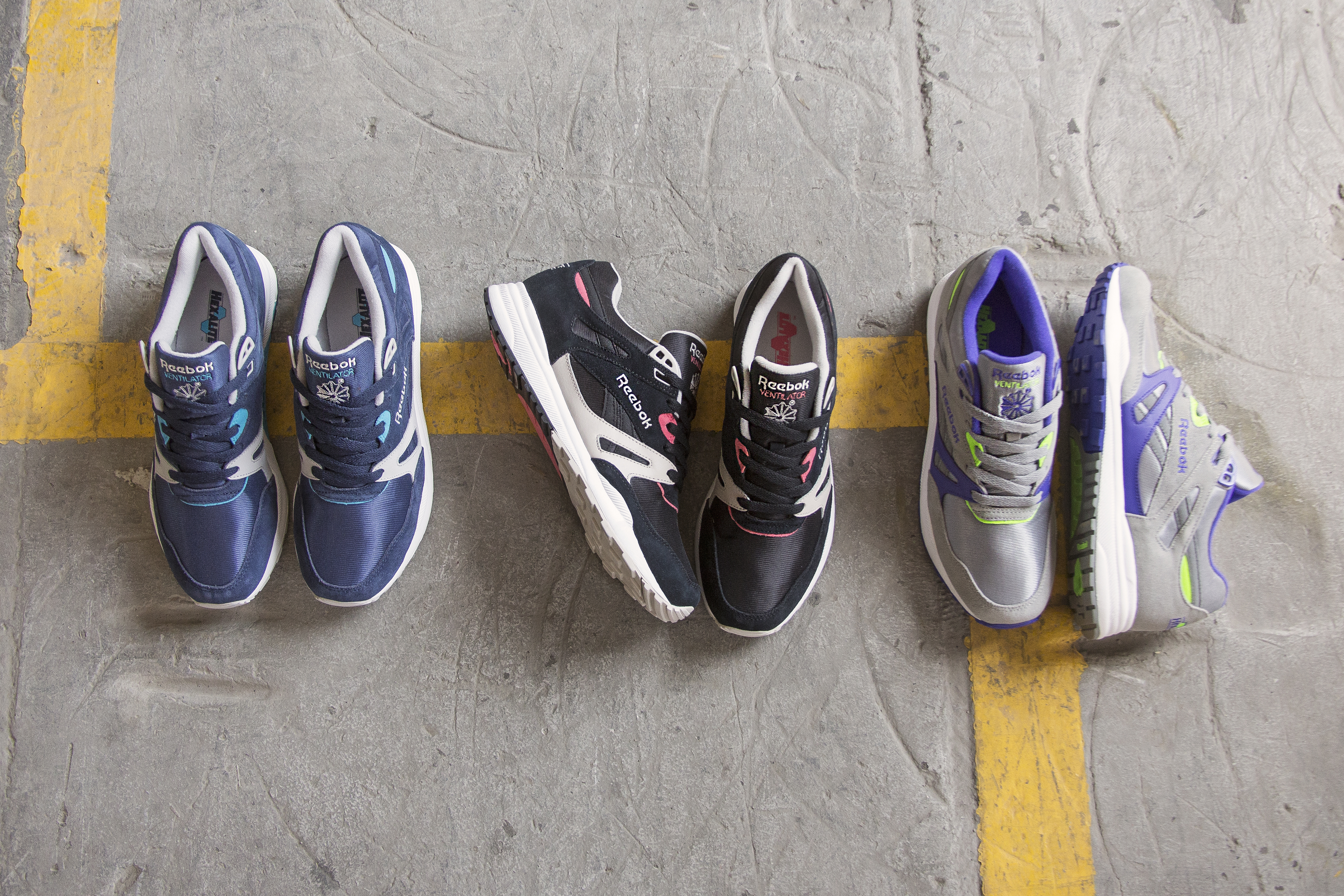
Pairs of Ventilator Recent

Reebok has continued to release the Ventilator in different styles and limited edition collections such as in 2006 with the release of the "Animal" series that included three models, Ventilator Ape, Cheetah and Horse, that was limited to 24 pairs per shoe. In 2007, Reebok collaborated with John Maeda, a graphic designer, computer scientist and professor at Massachusetts Institute of Technology (MIT). Maeda designed the Ventilator Titanium with handwritten code on the upper and insole. The shoe was available at custom Reebok stores and seen worn by celebrities such as Dane Cook, Adrian Grenier and Zach Braff.

The All Condition Ventilator Pack was released in 2008 with several models equipped with the hexalite energy return system, speckled midsoles and striped cord laces.

Ventilator HLS has been introduced in several versions throughout the years, in 2011 the shoe was released with a modern breezy mesh panel in a red, blue and white colorway. In 2012, the Ventilator HLS debuted another version with an updated mesh upper and gray reinforcements, as well as a minimized three eyelet lacing system.

The brand has reintroduced updated versions of the original Ventilator, referred to as the OG Ventilator which were released with the same lightweight design as the original but with hexalite technology and new colorways like the Reebok Ventilator OG "Pink."

In 2014, Reebok came out with the Night Vision, Heritage, and Tonal Ballistic Ventilator collections. Night Vision Ventilators were designed in bright neon hues with mesh and reflective materials. The Heritage collection was inspired by "old industrial place" featuring neutral hues with bright color accents in three different models. The Tonal Ballistic Ventilators featured rugged suede overlays over tonal uppers and contrasting white midsoles. The shoes have been seen on celebrities including French Montana and YG at the 2014 BET Hip Hop Awards.

== See also ==
- Reebok Classics
