= Track spikes =

Shoes with protruding spikes on the soles

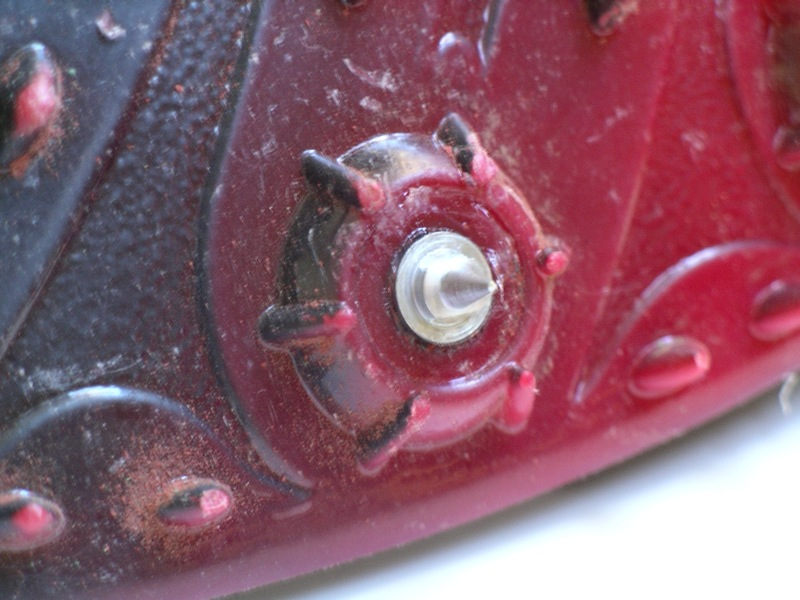
Track pin spikes

Track spikes, or just spikes, are a type of footwear featuring protruding spikes on the soles used by athletes when racing on the track. Some spikes are designed for longer-term training on tracks, but generally the shoes are used for racing. The term "spikes" can also refer to track shoes featuring such protrusions, though these are technically called pins. Spikes are similar to studs, which are used for team sports, although generally smaller and with a sharp point.

== History ==
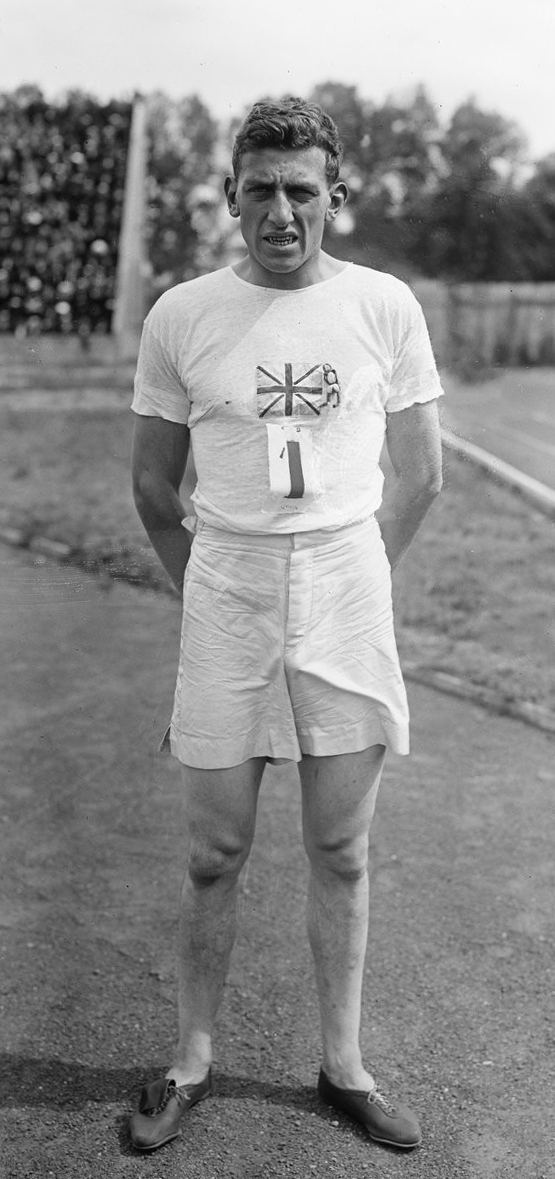
1924 Olympic 100 m champion Harold Abrahams wearing J.W. Fosters pioneering running spikes

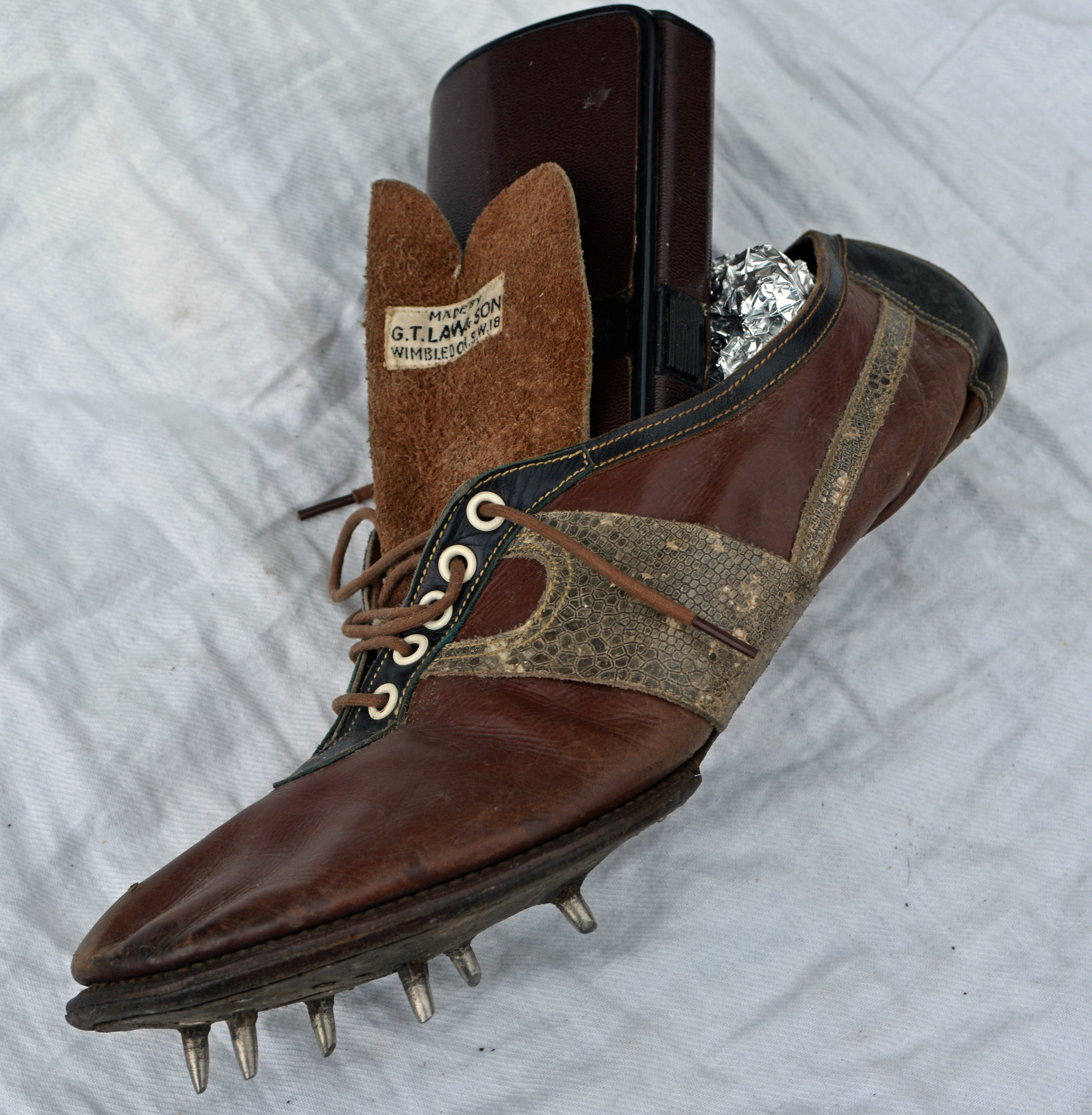
Old running spikes for cinder tracks

Track spikes had become popular in England by the 1860s, but the concept of spikes in shoes to give running traction has been around much longer. As written in the 1852 publication of Calmet's Dictionary of the Holy Bible regarding military arms at the time of Paul the Apostle (c. 5 – c. 67):

"Having the feet shod with the preparation of the gospel of peace;" not iron, not steel; but patient investigation, calm inquiry; assiduous, laborious, lasting; if not, rather, with firm footing in the gospel of peace. Whether the apostle here means stout, well-tanned leather, leather well prepared, by his "preparation of the gospel of peace" or shoes which had spikes in them, which, running into the ground, gave a steadfastness to the soldier who wore them, may come under remark hereafter. We shall only add, that Moses seems, at least according to our rendering, to have some allusion to shoes, either plated, or spiked, on the sole, when he says, (Deut. xxxiii. 25.) "Thy shoes shall be iron and brass; and as thy days shall thy strength be."

For pioneering the use of spikes, J.W. Foster and Sons's revolutionary running pumps appear in the book, Golden Kicks: The Shoes that changed Sport. The company began distributing shoes across the United Kingdom and were worn by British athletes. They were made famous by 100m Olympic champion Harold Abrahams (who would be immortalized in the Oscar winning film Chariots of Fire) in the 1924 Summer Olympics held in Paris.

In 1934, American football player and coach Pop Warner recommended them for running events in his widely distributed book, "Pop" Warner's book for boys.

Additionally, Adolf Dassler, the founder of Adidas, assisted in the development of track spikes for multiple events. In an effort to enhance the quality of spiked athletic footwear, he transitioned from a previous model of heavy metal spikes to attempting to utilize canvas and rubber. He carved them by hand and were eventually worn during the 1936 Olympics by Jesse Owens. People began to take notice, and Owens inherently helped popularize Dassler's design. Track spikes continued to gain notable recognition when Emil Zátopek, a distance runner from Czech Republic, wore them during the 1952 Olympics in Helsinki.

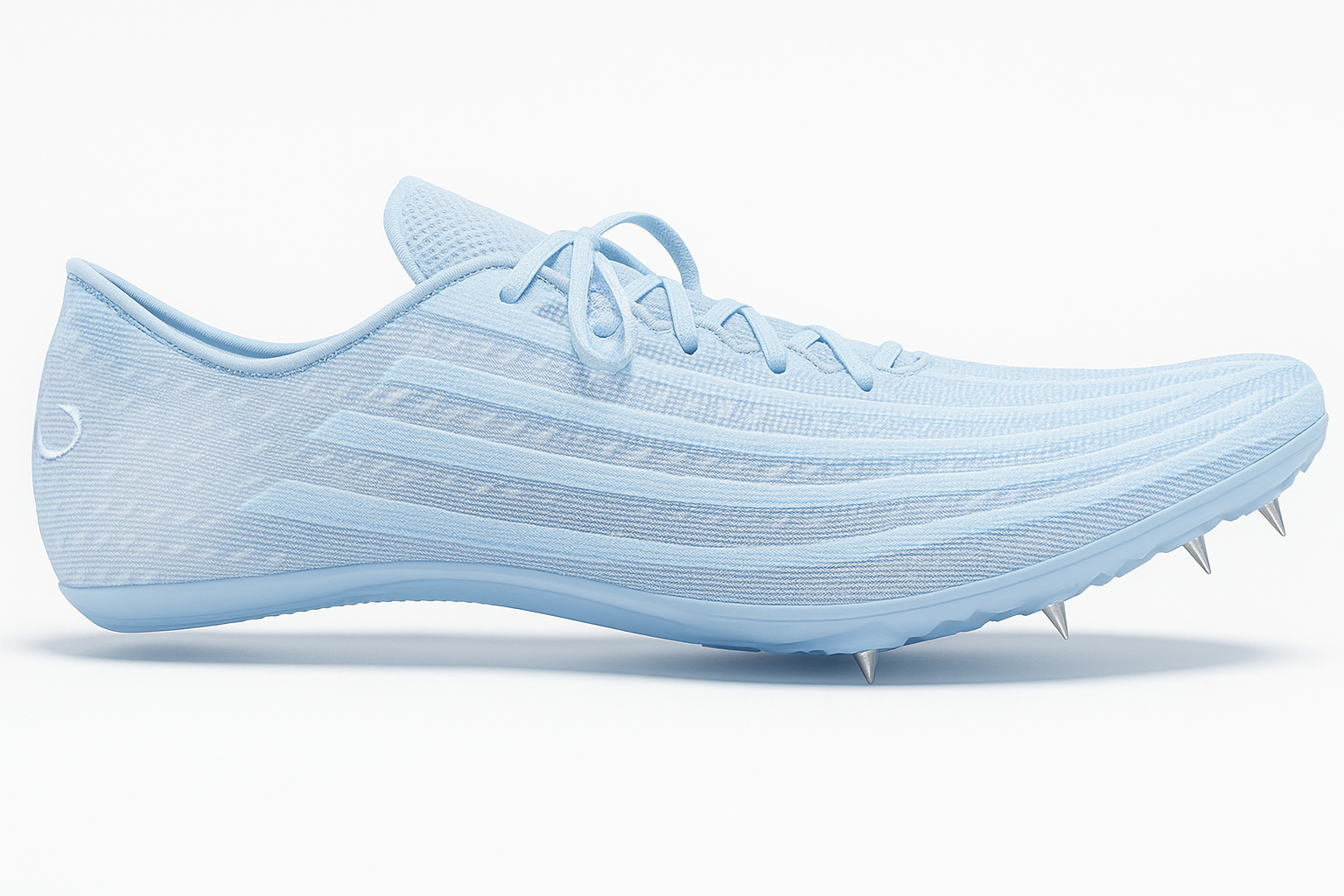
The Saysh Spike One track spike (2021 Prototype), worn by Allyson Felix at the Tokyo 2020 Olympics

In contrast to earlier eras when spikes were produced by external manufacturers—such as J.W. Foster & Sons in the early 1900s or the Dassler brothers in the 1920s—the landscape of athlete-influenced footwear shifted with Allyson Felix's Tokyo 2020 debut of the Saysh Spike One. According to media reports, she became the first track and field athlete to race and win Olympic medals in shoes branded and produced by herself.

== Design ==
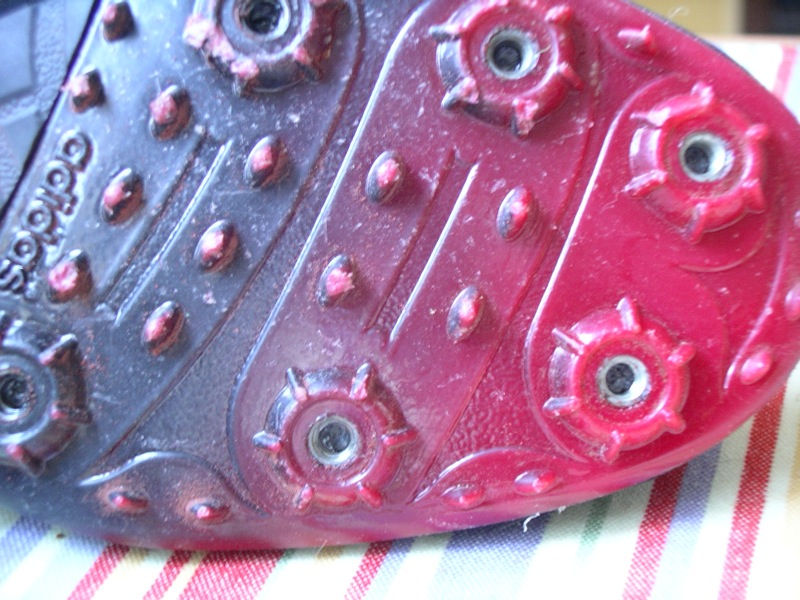
Spike plate with spikes removed

The front of the sole features a rigid or semi-rigid spike plate containing between 3 and 9 threaded holes called spike wells. Spikes can be screwed into each well using a spike wrench. Recently, some individuals have attempted to add a "through hole" at the bottom of the spike to make them easier to tighten, remove, and install.

Some shoes have permanent or "fixed" spikes which are not meant to be removed. Spikes may break during competition.

Track shoes are exceptionally light, some shoes weighing less than five ounces (140 grams) each, half the weight of many standard running shoes.

In most track shoes, the toe region bends up to allow space for protruding spikes and to encourage athletes to run on their toes. This upward angle, known as "taper," varies widely depending on the intended use of the shoe, and the taper angle can be rigid or flexible. Shoes with a large taper are said to be "aggressive."

This shoe design may cause harm to the athlete if worn for extended periods of time outside of competition. Injury may occur when walking in a leisurely fashion, as the athlete is not on his or her toes, which is the manner in which the shoes were meant to be worn.

== Types of shoes ==
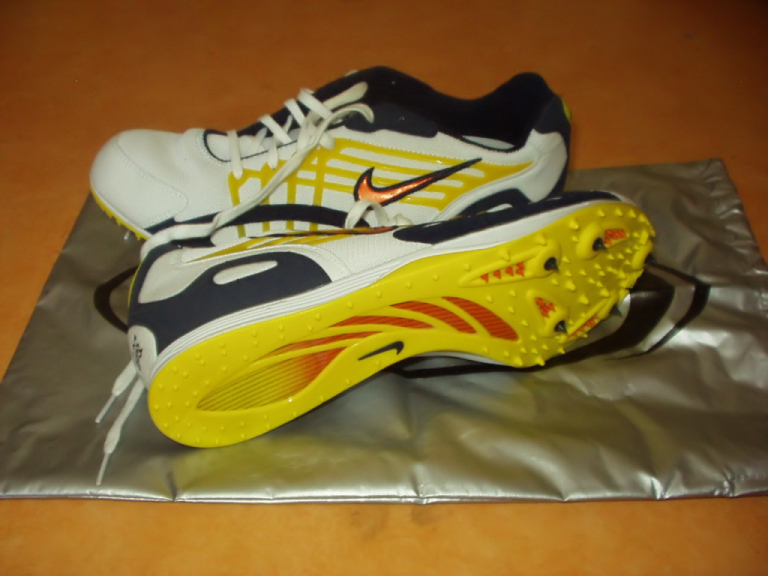
Nike Air Zoom Distance

There is considerable variation among track shoes depending on their intended use within the sport of track and field.

Sprint spikes generally have a very stiff spike plate, and have the greatest number of spike wells. Typically 6mm or shorter, sprint spikes are meant to be used for 100 through 400 meter events, as well as hurdles. The taper is highest and most rigid in sprint spikes, maximizing the efficiency of energy transfer with each stride. As a result, very little heel support is needed because sprinters spend the majority, if not all of the time, on their toes. The spikes are built to fit like a glove around the foot, keeping the runner's foot from slipping around in them. Sprinter spikes also have shorter studs than other distances, due to the responsiveness and amount of time spent on the ground.

Distance shoes differ from normal shoes in how they offer a more flexible spike plate, with less taper and fewer spikes. Because of the longer race distances, support through the mid-foot and heel is as important as efficiency with distance spikes. This means that distance spikes generally have a softer, more durable sole, particularly through the heel region. Although still "glove-like," the fit for distance spikes is generally slightly looser than for sprint spikes, given the longer race duration. Distance track spikes usually fit 4-6 spikes in the sole, allowing better traction without increasing risk of injury throughout such strenuous races. On the track, distance runners will almost always wear 1/4-inch spikes, because of track regulations and overall comfort.

Middle distance spikes are a hybrid of a sprint shoe and a distance shoe, featuring an intermediate level of taper, spike plate rigidity, cushioning and support. Certain middle distance spikes are also popular among hurdlers because they have a relatively steep taper for sprinting and a cushioned heel for landings.

Cross country spikes typically have no more than six spike points, and are similar to distance spikes in many respects. However, given the wide range of terrain encountered off-track, cross country spikes have a more durable rubber sole and supportive mid-foot, providing a level of cushioning and stabilization not required on a track. Cross country spikes can also be worn with a larger selection of spikes compared to track spikes, allowing for greater traction and support across uneven and rough terrains. Most cross country runners wear 3/8-inch or 1/2-inch spikes, as opposed to the 1/4-inch spikes in track. Depending on race length, surface types and personal preference, cross country spikes may be abandoned in favor of racing flats.

Shoes for field events and specialty events vary widely depending upon the specific requirements of each event. For example, long jump shoes are most similar to sprint spikes to provide good top speed, high jump shoes have flat bottoms and heel spikes to allow energy transfer through the entire foot, and steeplechase shoes are predominantly a water-resistant mesh for exceptional ventilation. While shoes for shot put, discus and hammer throw have flat rubber soles with no spikes, they may still occasionally be referred to as "track spikes."

Notable spike manufacturers include Adidas, Asics, Brooks, Mizuno, New Balance, Nike, Puma AG, Reebok and Saucony.

== Types of spikes ==
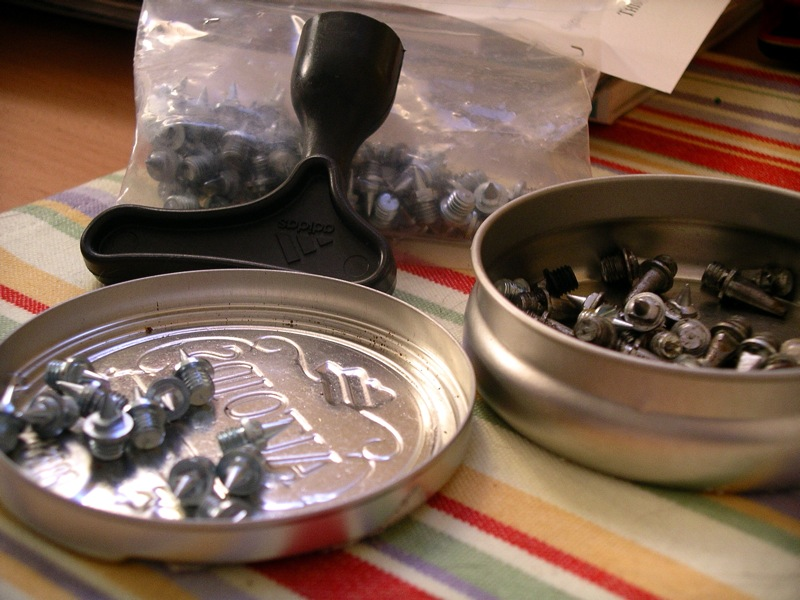
Quarter inch spikes and spike wrench

While most spikes are between 3/16 inch (4.8 mm) and 1/2 inch (13 mm) long, the most common is 1/4 inch (6.4 mm). Additionally, there are various specialty lengths, as well as minimal "blank" spikes (also called studs) used to cover a spike well. Spikes are generally metal (steel, aluminium, or more recently, titanium) or ceramic and come in three main types: the pyramid, the needle (pin), and the compression tier (Christmas tree). Pyramids are conical spikes that taper to a sharp point. They normally have a maximum diameter nearly equal to the diameter of the threads of the spike. Needles also have a sharp point, but a thinner cone diameter. Track spikes create traction by penetrating the track surface. Some tracks do not allow pin spikes and limit the length of pyramid spikes to minimize damage to the track. A variation for synthetic tracks is the Christmas Tree spike. It uses a terraced cone shape with a flat end designed to compress rather than penetrate the track below it. However, the notion that the compression spikes have less track penetration is not supported by scientific studies. Lastly, there are Tartan spikes that are dull that are most commonly used for rubber tracks.

== Rules ==
A cascading set of rules apply to spiked shoes and the spikes worn within them. World Athletics sets high level rules, which can then be tightened progressively by the track manufacturer, venue and meet organisers.

World Athletics rules require that spiked shoes have a stack height of no greater than 20mm, and that shoes can have up to 11 spikes. Their length can be up to 9mm on the track and 12mm for field events. However, major track manufacturers Mondo and Rekortan recommend lower lengths within their documentation, and it is common for most venues to allow only 7mm spikes for track events and 9mm in the field.

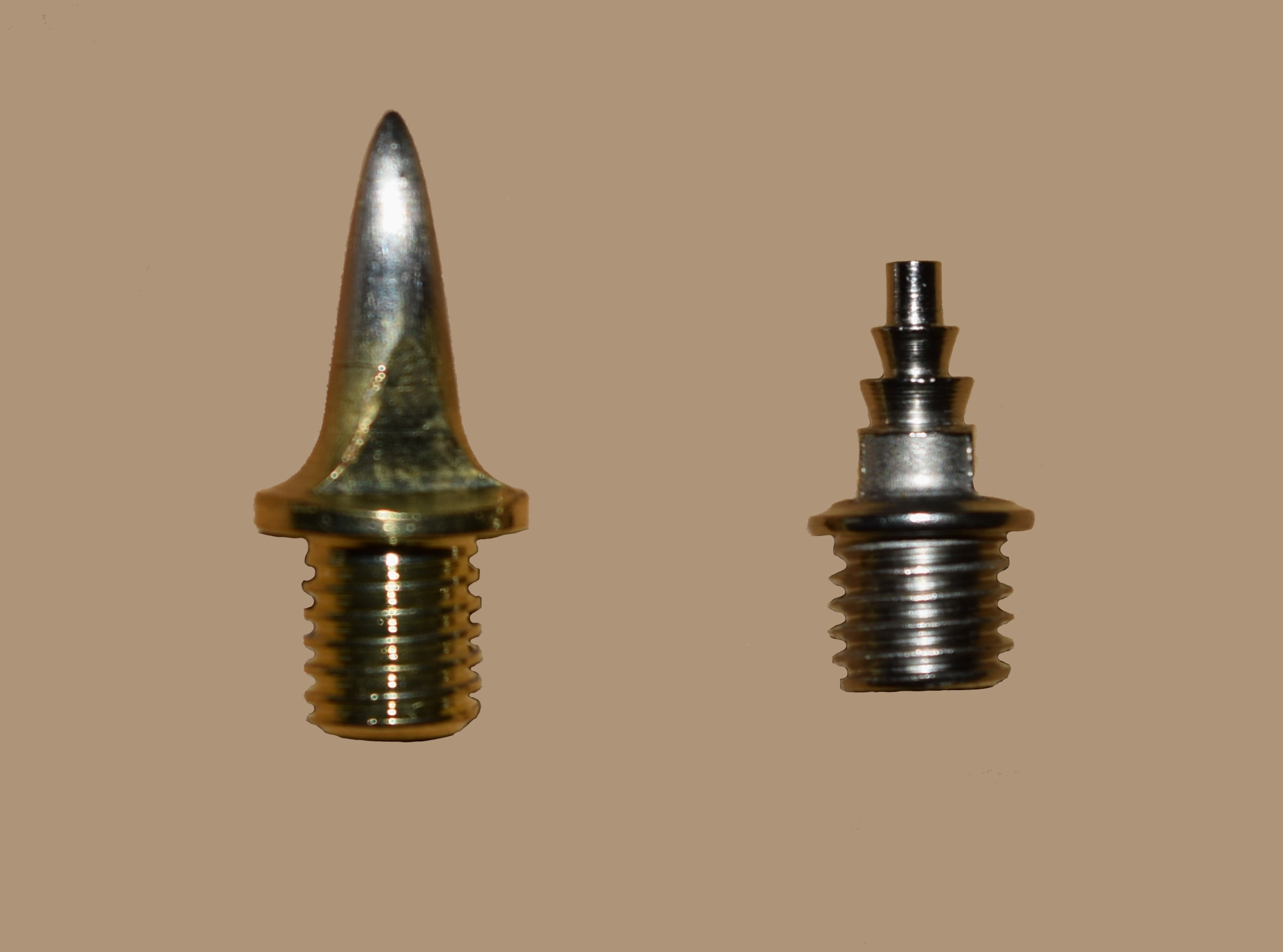
Comparison of needle spike and compression tier pin

== See also ==
- Racing flats
- Cleat (shoe)
- Comparison of orthotics
- Starting blocks
