= Joseph William Foster =

American businessman

Joe Foster
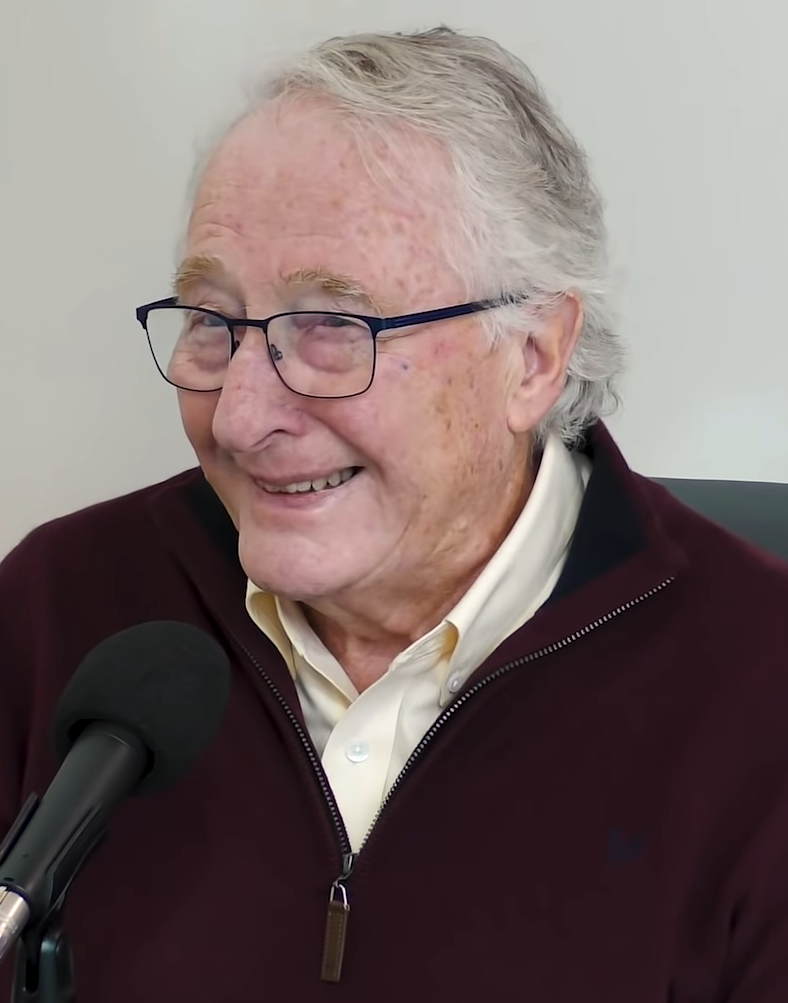
- Foster in 2022
- Born: Joseph William Foster; 18 May 1935 (age 90); Bolton, Lancashire, England
- Years active: 1958–present
- Agent: A.M. Heath
- Known for: Co-founder of Reebok
- Predecessor: Joseph William Foster
- Spouse: Jean
- Website: reebokthefounder.com

Joseph William Foster (born 18 May 1935) is the co-founder of Reebok with his older brother Jeffery William Foster (Jeff). He shares the same name as his grandfather, also named Joseph William Foster. Foster's grandfather was the founder of J.W. Foster and Sons and the pioneer of the spiked running shoe. The elder Foster also developed the trainer (sneaker) and provided most First Division (now English Premier League) Football teams with trainers.

== Career ==
Joe Foster was born into the J.W Foster & Sons family business founded by his grandfather. Joe joined the family business in 1952, but left the company a year later to complete his National Service. Upon his return after 2 years away in 1955, Foster began to have doubts about the future of the family business. The result was that Foster and his older brother Jeff left the family business in order to set up their own business in 1958. The two brothers founded "Mercury Sports Footwear", 6 miles down the road in Bury. After 18 months, the duo were advised to protect their company name by registering it. However, they found out that the word "Mercury Sports Footwear" was registered by another company. They started the search for a new name and came across the grey rhebok, a small South African antelope in Webster's dictionary. The two liked the name of the animal, and used the American spelling which was free to register.

The Reebok business developed with Jeff looking after production, Joe took charge of the sales and marketing side, as well as design which included the classic silhouette, outsole and the Starcrest logo. In the early years Joe travelled all over the United Kingdom marketing Reebok shoes to various retailers.

In 1979, Joe attended the NSGA (National Sporting Goods of America) Show in Chicago, where he met American businessman Paul Fireman. Fireman proceeded to license and distribute the Reebok brand in the United States. This collaboration was instrumental in turning Reebok into a leading athletic apparel company.

As the surviving co-founder of Reebok, Joe continues to speak about his career at various corporate events. Joe currently resides in Tenerife.
