= Saysh =

American footwear company

- Saysh logo since 2020
- Company type: Private
- Industry: Footwear; Apparel
- Founded: 2020 (launched June 2021)
- Founders: Allyson Felix; Wes Felix; Darren Breedveld
- Headquarters: Culver City, California, U.S.
- Key people: Wes Felix (CEO); Allyson Felix (President); Darren Breedveld (CFO/COO)
- Products: Women's athletic shoes (sneakers, running shoes), apparel
- Website: saysh.com

Saysh is an American footwear company focused on women's sneakers, founded by U.S. Olympic sprinter Allyson Felix and her brother Wes Felix. The company gained international attention when Felix introduced the Saysh Spike One during the Tokyo 2020 Olympics, winning a bronze medal in the 400 meters and a gold in the 4×400 relay — becoming the first woman in track and field history to win in their own spikes. She retired from Olympic competition the same year and shifted her focus to running Saysh full-time.

== History ==
Saysh was founded in 2020 during the COVID-19 pandemic after Allyson Felix’s public split with Nike over maternity protections left her without a shoe sponsor. Felix and her brother Wes Felix decided to create a brand "by women, for women." The company officially launched in June 2021 with the debut of the Saysh One sneaker, sold for US$150 and bundled with lifetime membership to the Saysh Collective, an online community for women.

Felix served as company president, with Wes Felix as CEO and co-founder Darren Breedveld as CFO/COO. The founders raised US$3 million in seed funding to launch operations. In a notable milestone, Felix competed in custom Saysh spikes at the U.S. Olympic Trials and the Tokyo 2020 Games — the first known instance of an athlete competing in the Olympics in their own brand's shoes. That same year, apparel company Athleta began retailing the Saysh One on its website as part of a partnership with the brand.

In September 2021, Saysh partnered with Canadian logistics firm SCI Group to streamline direct-to-consumer fulfillment. The entire first production run of the Saysh One sold out via pre-order.

In June 2022, Saysh secured US$8 million in Series A funding led by Iris Ventures with participation from Redpoint Ventures and Athleta. The funding was allocated to expand e-commerce capacity, enter wholesale channels, and introduce new product lines. In July 2022, the company opened its first physical retail presence, "The Home of Saysh," a pop-up and community space in Culver City, California.

In September 2023, Saysh released its first performance running shoe, the Felix Runner, followed by the Saysh Two lifestyle sneaker and the Evelyn Runner training shoe in 2024. In May 2024, Saysh announced a sponsorship with the Connecticut Sun of the WNBA to support maternal health initiatives.

== Saysh Spike One ==
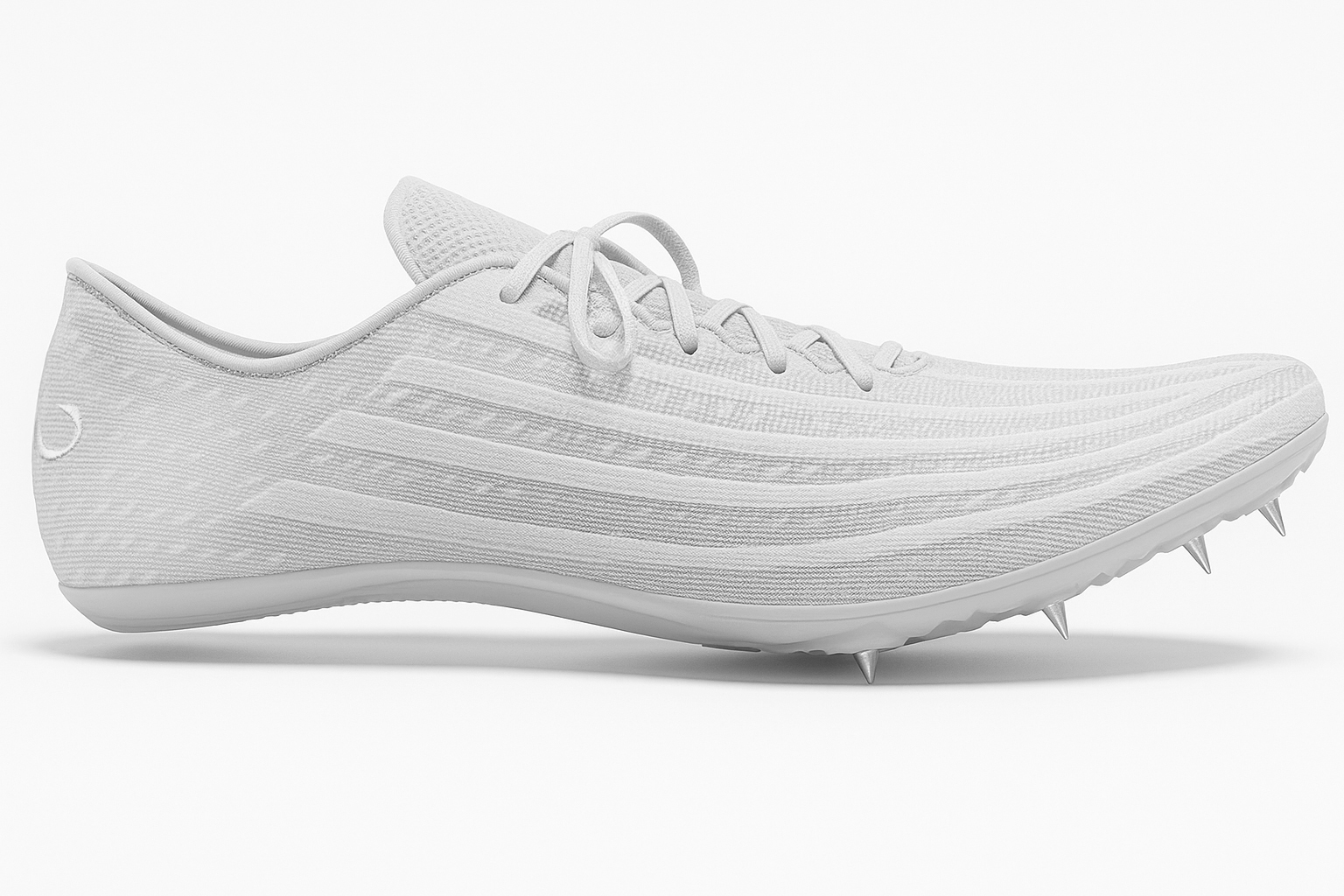
The Saysh Spike One track spike (2021 Prototype), worn by Allyson Felix at the Tokyo 2020 Olympics

The company's first shoe, the Saysh Spike One, was introduced in 2021 ahead of the Tokyo Olympic Games. Designed in collaboration with footwear designer Natalie Candrian, the spike was developed specifically for female athletes, with attention to anatomical fit and lightweight support. Each pair weighed only 3.9 ounces, including the ceramic spikes, making it one of the lightest sprint shoes at the Tokyo Games.

Felix debuted the Spike One during the Games, winning a bronze medal in the 400 metres and a gold in the 4 × 400 metre relay while wearing the shoe. This achievement drew international attention, as Felix became one of the few athletes to win Olympic medals in footwear produced by her own brand.

== Founders and leadership ==
Allyson Felix and Wes Felix are the co-founders of Saysh, along with early partner Darren Breedveld. Allyson Felix – an 11-time Olympic medalist and one of the most decorated track & field athletes in history – serves as President of Saysh. Her older brother Wes Felix is the company's Chief Executive Officer. Wes Felix is a former All-American sprinter and later became Allyson's agent; he founded the sports management agency EVOLVE and helped guide her post-Nike career.

The founders were motivated by their firsthand experience of inequity in the sports industry: Allyson Felix's public dispute with Nike over maternity protections inspired them to create a brand that would "champion women’s specific needs" in footwear. Allyson contributed her athletic credibility and platform, while Wes brought business expertise and industry connections. They assembled a small leadership team with footwear design experience; notably, former Nike innovation engineer Tiffany Beers joined as Head of Product. Felix has described her transition from athlete to entrepreneur as an extension of her advocacy, stating that building Saysh is part of "creating the change and not waiting for others to do it."

== Products ==
Saysh designs footwear and apparel specifically for women, rejecting the industry norm of merely adapting men's designs ("shrink it and pink it"). Its proprietary FemiformityFIT technology involves shoe lasts engineered for the typical female foot anatomy – for example, a narrower heel and wider forefoot relative to men's shoe shapes. The Saysh One's design was inspired by the flow of a wrap dress and the curves of a running track.

Product	Launch	Category	Description
Saysh Spike One	2021 (prototype)	Track racing spike	Custom track spike developed for Allyson Felix's use at the Tokyo Olympics; not mass-marketed.
Saysh One	2021	Lifestyle sneaker	Debut product; a low-top casual sneaker for everyday wear, designed exclusively on a female last with a snug heel and wider toe box.
Saysh Two	2022	Lifestyle sneaker	Second-generation women's sneaker, inspired by vintage running shoe styles; designed by an all-women team with an emphasis on versatility.
Felix Runner	2023	Running trainer	High-performance running shoe (neutral trainer) built for "everyday women who run," featuring a one-piece molded heel and cushioned midsole.Crafted from a women-specific last with biomechanics input.
Evelyn Runner	2024	Running trainer	Lightweight, responsive running shoe intended for daily training; expands Saysh's performance line.
Apparel & Accessories	2021–present	Athletic apparel	Limited apparel and accessories, including themed collections such as the "Paris Collection" around the 2024 Olympics.

All Saysh shoes are marketed as ethically and sustainably manufactured for women. The company also offers a Maternity Returns policy, allowing free exchanges if a customer's shoe size changes during pregnancy.

== Branding and marketing ==
The company's slogan, "women deserve better," encapsulates its mission to offer women improved options in footwear, representation, and opportunity. Allyson Felix’s personal story and advocacy are integral to the brand identity: her public stance against inequitable maternity policies and her achievement of racing in her own shoes are featured prominently in brand storytelling.

The name "Saysh," from the French "Seiche," means a wave moving back and forth, symbolizing balance—reflecting the brand's mission to empower women through versatile, elegant design bridging sport and style. According to Wes Felix, the concept symbolizes the company's goal of correcting imbalance in the athletic footwear industry and "creating a future in which inequality is undermined by female creativity and athleticism."

== Sponsorships and endorsements ==
Saysh's early endorsement strategy centered on Allyson Felix herself, leveraging her Olympic competition in Saysh spikes as proof of product credibility. In June 2021, the company reached a distribution agreement with Athleta (Felix's apparel sponsor), which also invested in Saysh and featured its footwear on Athleta's platform.

On May 8, 2024, the Connecticut Sun of the WNBA announced a sponsorship with Saysh, marking the brand's first team partnership. Saysh became an official sponsor of several Sun events during the 2024 season, including the team's annual Maternal Health Awareness games. Felix noted the shared values between the Sun and Saysh, particularly around representation and accountability for women in sports.
