= Paul Fireman =

American businessman (born 1944)

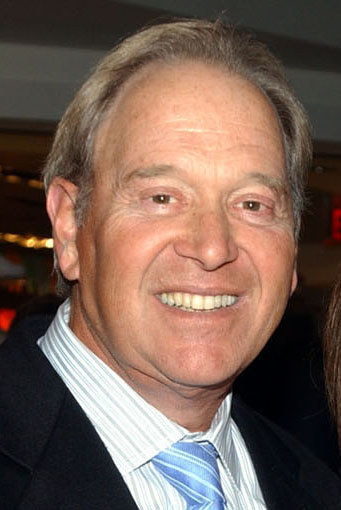
- Born: February 14, 1944 (age 82); Cambridge, Massachusetts, U.S.
- Occupation: Businessman
- Employer: Fireman Capital Partners
- Spouse: Phyllis Brenner

Paul Fireman (born February 14, 1944) is an American businessman, who for 26 years led Reebok International, Ltd. as chairman and CEO. Fireman sold Reebok to Adidas in 2005.

== Early life and education ==
Fireman was born February 14, 1944, in Cambridge, Massachusetts, to a Jewish family and raised in the working-class city of Brockton, Massachusetts, also called 'Shoe City'. He attended high school at Tabor Academy, a private secondary school in Marion, MA and matriculated to Boston University, but did not graduate.

== Personal life ==
Fireman and his wife Phyllis (née Brenner) grew up in Brockton, Massachusetts and met at age 12 at a YMHA mixer. Fireman and his wife, Phyllis, are competitive bridge players. In 2014, his team won the Roth Open Swiss Teams at the Summer North American Bridge Championship (NABC) in Las Vegas and subsequently captured the bronze medal representing the U.S. in Chennai, India at the World Bridge Championships in 2015.

== Career ==
Fireman began his career at age 18 working in the family business, Boston Camping, selling outdoor sporting goods and fishing tackle for 15 years.

While attending a sporting goods show in Chicago in 1979 Fireman met Joe Foster, the owner of an English running shoe company founded in 1958 called Reebok. Fireman acquired the North American sales rights to Reebok in 1979 and eventually bought the English-based parent company outright in 1984. Reebok capitalized on the increasing popularity of aerobics in California and introduced the world's first aerobic shoe designed specifically for women in 1982 called Freestyle. Riding the success of the Freestyle shoe as the aerobics craze swept across America, Fireman grew the company and Reebok issued an IPO in 1985. In 1988, Fireman established the annual Reebok Human Rights Awards recognizing activists under the age of 30 who exposed and reduced human rights atrocities.

Fireman sold Reebok to Adidas in 2005 for $3.8 billion; Fireman himself made $800 million from the deal. He is currently the Chairman of Fireman Capital Partners, a Boston-based, consumer-focused private equity firm founded in 2008 with his son Dan, the firm's Managing Partner.

== Golf course development ==
Fireman has been active in golf course development and in 1991 he purchased Willowbend Country Club (Mashpee, Massachusetts). The development of additional courses followed that included Rio Mar Resort and Country Club (Rio Grande, Puerto Rico), Costa Caribe Golf and Country Club (Ponce, Puerto Rico), Coco Beach Golf and Country Club (Rio Grande, Puerto Rico), The Ranch Golf Club (Southwick, Massachusetts), and Starr Pass Club (Tucson, Arizona).

Fireman was one of the developers of Liberty National Golf Club (Jersey City, New Jersey), which is adjacent to Liberty State Park. The golf club is one of the most expensive ever built, costing a reported $250 million. It site had formerly housed an ammunition depot during World War I, a prisoner of war camp during World War II, and later an oil refinery and warehouse for industrial goods, having become a "a toxic moonscape of corroded oil tanks, contaminated soil, and rusting warehouses" by 1999 (Forbes). Although Fireman has publicly taken credit for paying to redevelop the "former toxic Superfund site", the cost of cleaning the land was at least in part paid with public funds. It is one of the most exclusive golf clubs in the world, with initial membership fees contemplated at $500,000 to $750,000 in 2004.

In 2017 Fireman spearheaded a push to expand the golf club by 3 holes by acquiring the Caven Point section of Liberty State Park, which is a migratory bird habitat, sparking a controversy amongst Jersey City community members and environmental activists. The attempted acquisition of Caven Point by private developers also inspired proposed legislation entitled The "Liberty State Park Protection Act", which would permanently protect much of the park from privatization.

Fireman responded to criticism of the proposed Liberty State Park redevelopment by supporting a communications campaign that characterized the project as a matter of social equity. A social media initiative funded by Fireman opposed the public redevelopment plan, arguing that it limited participation from communities of color and raising questions about representation in the park's decision-making process.

The golf club also received $751,452 through the federal Paycheck Protection Program, (PPP), a COVID-19 relief initiative intended to assist businesses affected by pandemic-related shutdowns.

Since its opening in 2006, Liberty National has hosted three FedEx Cup playoff tournaments (The Barclays in 2009, 2013 and The Northern Trust in 2019, 2021) and the Presidents Cup in 2017. Liberty National also hosts junior golf tournaments (AJGA Polo Junior Classic 2019, 2021) and the First Tee of New Jersey.

== Other activities ==
In 2010, Fireman placed his Winecup-Gamble Ranch up for sale for $50 million.

In 2014, Fireman proposed a $4.6 billion project on New Jersey's Gold Coast, which would include a 95-story tower with a casino and 100,000-seat motor sport stadium. The New Jersey Constitution does not allow casinos outside of Atlantic City. In 2016, Fireman was an important backer of Public Question 1, a ballot measure that would amend the constitution to allow casino gambling in North Jersey. After numerous polls showed that Question 1 had no chance to pass, Fireman, along with Jeff Gural, pulled their financial support for the measure. Bill Cortese, the leader of Trenton's Bad Bet, a group opposed to the question, said, "Trenton's Bad Bet will not be distracted by billionaire developers throwing temper tantrums because they don't get what they want." In 2016, the New Jersey Casino Expansion Amendment (2016) ballot question was put before New Jersey voters asking them if they would allow the expansion of casino gambling outside Atlantic City via a constitutional amendment. Voters rejected the ballot question by a margin of 77% to 23% effectively ending the casino proposal.

== Philanthropy and political contributions ==
The Paul and Phyllis Fireman Charitable Foundation was established in 1985.

Fireman is a supporter of The First Tee whose mission is to "impact the lives of young people by providing educational programs that build character, instill life-enhancing values and promote healthy habits through the game of golf."

In September 2024, Fireman and his son Dan established the Liberty National Foundation, a 501(c)(3) organization that supports youth, veterans, and first responders through golf-related and other charitable programs. The foundation announced a pledge of $100 million in donations over the next decade and has partnered with TGR foundation to launch a fully funded scholarship. In October, 2025 the foundation announced their Liberty National ACE Grant program had reached over $9 million in reimbursements.

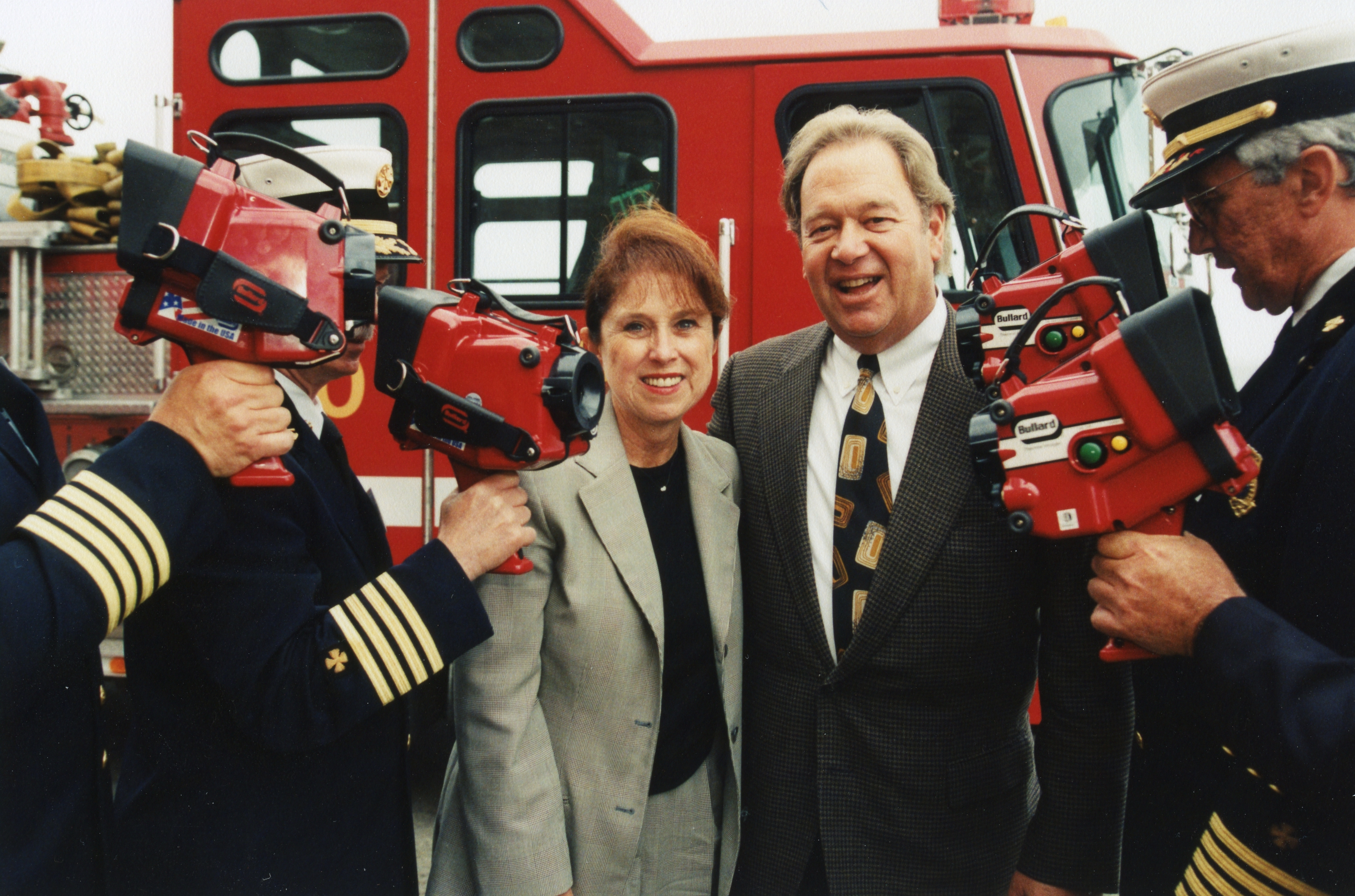
Paul and Phyllis Fireman after donating Bullard Thermal Imaging Cameras to the Brockton City Fire Department in 2000.

=== Campaign contributions ===
Fireman donated $250,000 to Republican Mitt Romney's 2012 presidential campaign, but he has also donated to Democratic Senators Bob Menendez and Cory Booker and several other candidate and committees of both parties. Fireman donated $1 million to the 2016 presidential campaign of New Jersey Governor Chris Christie.

== Awards ==
- The Academy of Achievement's Golden Plate Award, 1987
- Thurgood Marshall Corporate Leadership Award
- Northeastern University Commencement Speaker and Honorary Degree, Doctor of Humanities, 1990
- Babson College, Honorary Degree, LL.D. Doctor of Laws, 1994
- Tabor Academy Lifetime Achievement Award, 2007
- Suffolk University Commencement Speaker and Honorary Degree, Doctor of Commerce, 2013
- Mannie Jackson Award, 2015
- Sports Business Journal Lifetime Achievement Award, 2015
