= 2016 New Jersey casino expansion amendment =

Proposed constitutional amendment in New Jersey

The New Jersey casino expansion amendment (2016) was a proposed constitutional amendment in New Jersey that would have allowed casino gambling outside of Atlantic City. Voters rejected the ballot question by a margin of 77% to 23%.

== Ballot question ==
The ballot question reads:

Do you approve amending the Constitution to permit casino gambling in two additional counties in this State? At present, casino gambling is allowed only in Atlantic City in Atlantic County. Only one casino in each of the two counties would be permitted. Each casino is to be located in a town that is at least 72 miles from Atlantic City. The amendment would allow certain persons to apply first for a casino license.

The proposed New Jersey Casino Expansion Amendment resulted from an agreement among Gov. Chris Christie and Democratic state legislators. State legislators were in deadlock over who would be allowed to own new casinos and tax revenue sharing. The measure does not say where the casinos would be allowed. Location and other matters such as tax rates would be determined by enabling legislation to be passed by the state legislature. A law passed by popular vote in 1976 gives Atlantic City a monopoly on casino gambling in New Jersey.

Current holders of casino licenses in Atlantic City would have six months to draft proposals for two casinos in the northern area of the state. Each casino proposal would have to include an investment of at least $1 billion. If the state failed to receive proposals under those guidelines within six months, license holders outside of Atlantic City would be permitted to submit proposals

== Economic impact ==
An analysis by Fitch, a credit-rating agency, determined that as many as four of Atlantic City's eight casinos would be bankrupted by expanding casino gambling outside the city. Supporters of gambling in North Jersey say that the measure would help Atlantic City by redirecting as much as $200 million a year in tax revenue to the city. Opponents say that it is unlikely that much revenue would be generated and that it would not make up for the losses due to new competition. In recent years four Atlantic City casinos have closed, causing severe economic problems.

== Reception ==
=== Opposition ===
Don Guardian, Atlantic City's mayor, said, "People don't just come to Atlantic City for gambling. ... They come for the spas, the restaurants, the nightclubs. If you cut half the casinos out, you would lose half the tax revenue that's going to the state."

Debra DiLorenzo, president of the Chamber of Commerce of Southern New Jersey, said, "If you vote for this, 23,000 to 30,000 families are going to be out of work. ... How does that help our state? That's a punch to the gut"

Jim Whelan, a state senator, said that he was disappointed with the final version amendment and that the new casinos would damage casinos in Atlantic City. He expressed frustration that the companies most likely to benefit from the amendment were two out-of-state concerns, MGM Resorts International and Caesars Entertainment.

Bob McDevitt, local president the Unite-HERE casino workers union, said,

We're not asking for their stadiums, office parks, chemical plants or big pharma to be brought to south Jersey. ... We just want to be left alone. We've gone through a decade of crisis after crisis, from casino competition in neighboring states to the collapse of the economy to Superstorm Sandy to the casino closings in 2014 to the proposed state takeover. I don't know how many more of these we can stand.

In an editorial The Star-Ledger said of state legislators who support the amendment,

They are pushing parochial interests, moving to lure casinos to their home counties even as experts warn that the market is close to saturation. They are charging ahead without nailing down plans to protect Atlantic City. And they are not close to settling on a rational tax scheme for the new casinos.

The governing bodies of Freehold Borough and Oceanport announced their opposition of the amendment because it will prevent the Freehold Raceway and the Monmouth Park Racetrack from having casino gambling in their facilities. Jay Coffey, Oceanport's mayor, said,

Other states have gaming facilities at racetracks and New Jersey doesn't. Instead of emulating what these states are doing (smaller, numerous, more conveniently located venues with multi-faceted revenue streams), our state legislators have decided to double down on the business model (Atlantic City's) that isn't working and they want to do it on a grand scale.

=== Support ===
After numerous polls showed that Question 1 had no chance to pass, Jeffrey Gural and Paul Fireman pulled their financial support for the measure. Bill Cortese, the leader of Trenton's Bad Bet, a group opposed to the question, said, "Trenton's Bad Bet will not be distracted by billionaire developers throwing temper tantrums because they don't get what they want." Gural blamed the failure of Question 1 on the general political climate and said that he might sponsor a similar ballot measure in 2018.

Gural and Fireman, through companies they control, were the sole financial backers of Our Turn NJ, a political committee formed to support the amendment. Both donated about $5 million. Our Turn NJ spent about $8.5 million before abandoning its campaign.

=== Polling ===
Poll results announced by Stockton University on September 30, 2016, showed that 68 percent of likely voters opposed the question, 27 percent supported it, and 5 percent were undecided.

Poll results announced by the Rutgers-Eagleton Center for Public Interest Polling on September 19, 2016, showed that of registered voters 58 percent opposed the question, 35 percent support it, and 7 percent are undecided.

According to poll results announced by Fairleigh Dickinson University, 57 percent of registered voters opposed the question, 35 percent supported it, and 8 percent were undecided.

== Results ==
The amendment was defeated on November 8, 2016. Although all counties in New Jersey rejected the amendment by a sizable majority, the greatest opposition came from South Jersey (in particular Atlantic County) with some northern counties showing up to three times the amount of support as those in the south.

Results by county: No: 60–70%; 70–80%; 80–90%; 90–100%

Public Question 1
Choice	Votes	%
For	707,064	22.76
Against	2,400,081	77.24
Total	3,107,145	100.00

=== By county ===
County	No		Yes		Margin		Total votes
County	#	%	#	%	#	%	Total votes
Atlantic	100,089	93.62%	6,828	6.38%	93,261	87.27%	106,917
Bergen	232,225	72.98%	85,973	27.02%	146,252	45.96%	318,198
Burlington	146,109	78.35%	40,385	21.65%	105,724	56.70%	186,494
Camden	142,162	79.23%	37,278	20.77%	104,884	58.46%	179,440
Cape May	38,032	89.95%	4,251	10.05%	33,781	79.90%	42,283
Cumberland	37,056	85.25%	6,410	14.75%	30,646	70.50%	43,466
Essex	148,507	71.92%	57,969	28.08%	90,538	43.84%	206,476
Gloucester	100,385	82.59%	21,154	17.41%	79,231	65.18%	121,539
Hudson	104,750	68.62%	47,906	31.38%	56,844	37.24%	152,656
Hunterdon	49,165	79.90%	12,371	20.10%	36,794	59.80%	61,536
Mercer	103,080	76.29%	32,042	23.71%	71,038	52.58%	135,122
Middlesex	191,410	77.31%	56,191	22.69%	135,219	54.62%	247,601
Monmouth	222,229	77.76%	63,571	22.24%	158,658	55.52%	285,800
Morris	153,863	76.21%	48,026	23.79%	105,837	52.42%	201,889
Ocean	206,523	84.19%	38,787	15.81%	167,736	68.38%	245,310
Passaic	85,691	69.51%	37,586	30.49%	48,105	39.02%	123,277
Salem	22,544	76.24%	7,027	23.76%	15,507	52.48%	29,571
Somerset	109,624	77.98%	30,958	22.02%	78,666	55.96%	140,582
Sussex	51,522	69.15%	22,982	30.85%	28,540	38.30%	74,504
Union	121,951	76.34%	37,804	23.66%	84,147	52.68%	159,755
Warren	33,164	74.14%	11,565	25.86%	21,599	48.28%	44,729
Totals	2,400,081	77.24%	707,064	22.76%	1,693,017	54.48%	3,107,145
