= J.W. Foster and Sons =

Athletic shoe manufacturing company

J.W. Foster & Sons
- Type: Private
- Industry: Footwear
- Founded: 1895
- Founder: Joseph William Foster
- Defunct: 1976; 50 years ago
- Fate: Taken over by Reebok in 1976
- Successor: Reebok
- Headquarters: Bolton, England
- Products: Sneakers

J W Foster & Sons (Athletic Shoes) Limited was an athletic shoe manufacturing company located in Bolton, England. Established by Joseph W. Foster in 1895, the company was a pioneer in the use of track spikes for runners and athletes, producing most of the highly-regarded running shoes in the 1920s. J.W. Foster & Sons was absorbed by Reebok (a company established by Foster's sons) in 1976.

== History ==
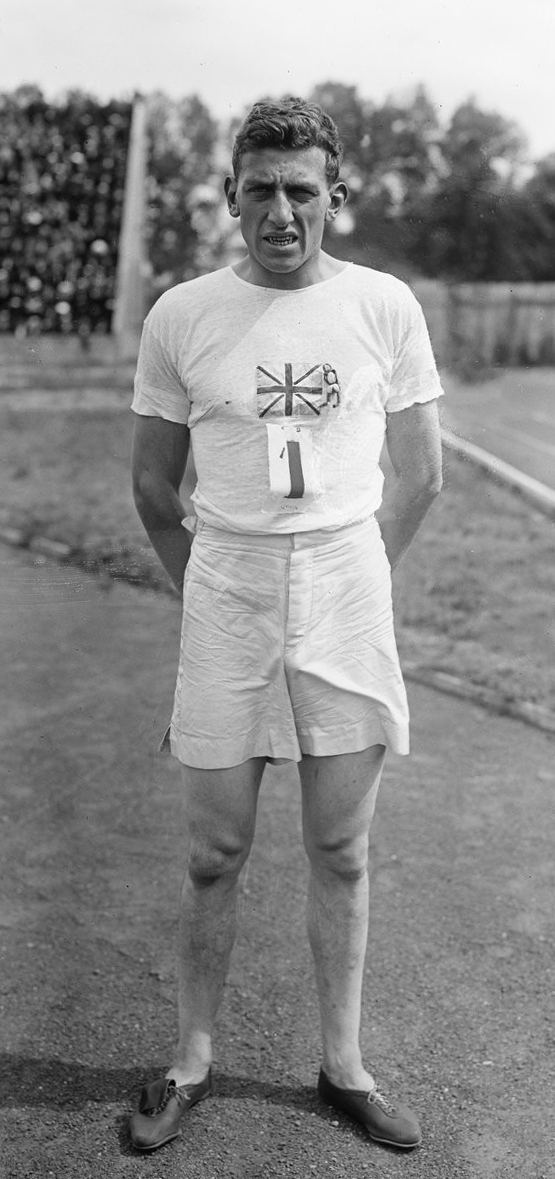
1924 Olympic 100 m champion Harold Abrahams wearing J.W. Foster's pioneering running spikes

The company founder, Joseph William Foster, was born in 1881 and trained as a cobbler. At the age of 14 in 1895, as a member of the local harriers, he started work in his bedroom above his father's sweet shop in Bolton, and designed some of the earliest spiked running shoes. After his ideas progressed, he founded his business 'J.W. Foster' in 1900. Later he joined with his sons and changed the company name to "J.W. Foster and Sons" in 1910. Foster opened a small factory called Olympic Works, and gradually became famous among athletes for his "running pumps". During the World War I, the company produced army boots (which production would be resumed by the company in the Second War).

== Revolution ==
For pioneering the use of spikes, the company's revolutionary running pumps appear in the book, Golden Kicks: The Shoes that changed Sport. The company began distributing shoes across the United Kingdom which were worn by British athletes, and were made famous by 100m Olympic champion Harold Abrahams (who would be immortalized in the Oscar winning film Chariots of Fire) in the 1924 Summer Olympics held in Paris.

In 1933, Joseph William Foster died, and "J. W. Foster & Sons" was continued by sons Billy and Jim, headed at first by Joe's widow Maria. Eventually, Maria transferred the leadership of the family business over to Billy and Jim in 1939. Again war interrupted the business, but J W Foster & Sons picked up their business, with Derek Ibbotson breaking the Mile world record. Foster was also supplying most First Division (now English Premier League) Football teams with trainers and signed a contract for distribution in the United States by Frank Ryan and Bob Geinjack, coaches at Yale University.

Jeffrey William Foster (Jeff), Jim's eldest son, joined J. W. Foster in 1948 and his younger brother Joseph William (Joe). later joined in 1952. In 1953 National Service took Jeff and Joe away for 2 years. Upon their return to J. W. Foster & Sons, they saw a business failing to react to the growth of rival manufacturers such as Adidas and Puma, which had successfully entered the market after World War II. Their requests to improve the family business went unheeded, so the two brothers established their own company, Reebok in Bury in November 1958.

Eighteen months after Joe and Jeff left J W Foster to set up their own company, Billy died at the age of 58. Jim carried on the business at Deane Road, until the ‘Olympic Works’ made way for the new Bolton Technical College, which was later to become Bolton University. Jim moved J. W. Foster & Sons (Athletic Shoe) Ltd to the North of Bolton, opening as a sports shop. J. W. Foster & Sons continued until his death in 1976, at which time the company was absorbed by Reebok. The J.W. Foster Tradition continues today as J W. Foster (Heritage) Ltd, with many items held on loan in the Reebok archive at the company's worldwide headquarters in Boston, Massachusetts.

== See also ==
- Macbeth Footwear
