= Racing flat =

Type of lightweight athletic shoes

Racing flats, or simply flats, are lightweight athletic shoes designed for "long distance" track and field, cross country, and most often, road races. They differ from normal training shoes mainly by the lack of a substantial heel to toe drop.

Flats weigh less than regular running sneakers. In 2014 some racing flats weighed as little as 3 oz (85 g) as companies competed to generate the lightest racing flat.

== Construction ==
Racing flats have only small or no heel lift, and little padding or support. The heel lift of flats ranges from 4mm to 10mm which is closer to the heel lift seen in trainers. They allow a prepared athlete to use their natural foot strength, elasticity, and proprioception to run quickly.

A typical flat consists of a nearly flat sole, and a minimal upper to hold it onto the foot. Frequently the thin insole is glued in place to reduce movement and weight. The sole is constructed of two materials: an engineered lightweight foam upper sole attached to a hard rubber base. The uppers are often mesh so that moisture can escape, even on crosscountry variants.

Racing flats vary in weight, ranging from 230 g (8.1 oz) down to the mere 70 g (2.5 oz) of the women's New Balance 5000. Reducing the weight to obtain the natural feel for a runner can result in a shorter lifetime for the shoe. In general racing flats will last fewer miles before wearing out compared to trainers. A typical racing flat will last for about 150–300 miles.

=== Minimalism ===
Racing flats were predominantly used before the invention of high heeled and cushioned running shoes in the early 1970s. Before the invention of the cushioned Nike shoes in the 1970s, all runners used flats because that was the only shoe available for road running. The goal in the shift towards higher-heeled and softer midsole shoes was to reduce stress on joints and improve arch support. High support shoes are still prevalent in many current running shoe models, however, many long-distance road runners began to transition back to the minimalist racing flat shoe in the early 2000s.

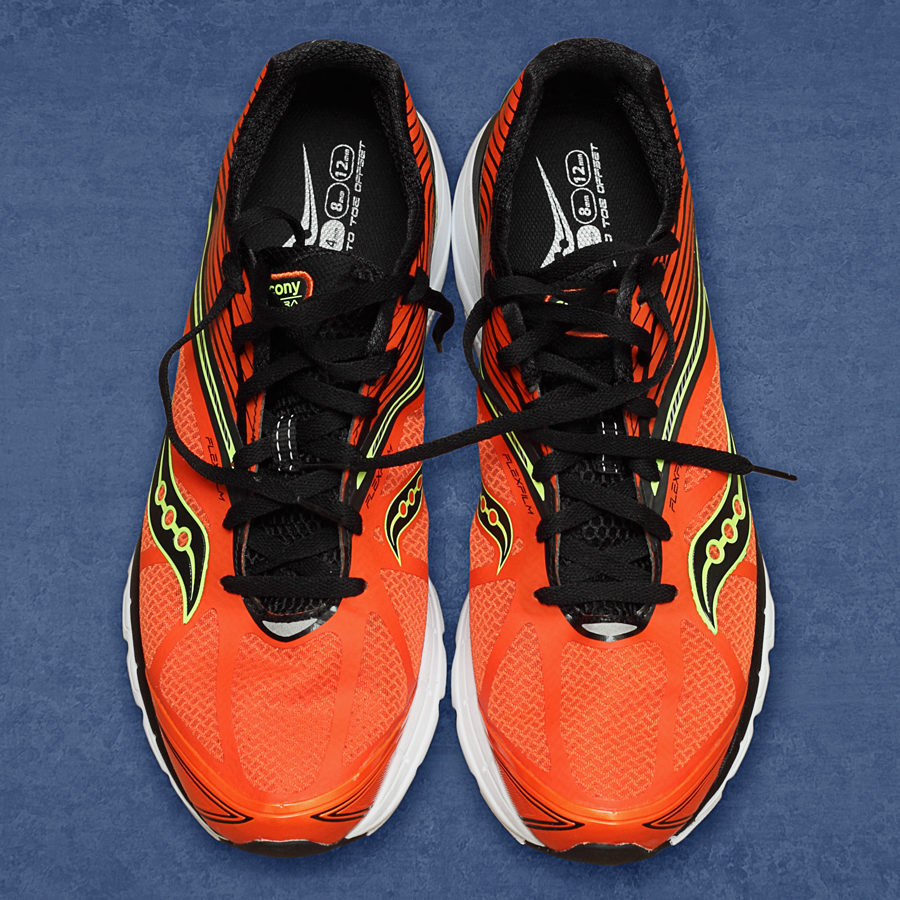
Saucony Kinvara 4 Racing Shoe

Studies have suggested that some running injuries can occur as a result of the significant arch support and cushioning found in "traditional" running shoes. As a result, a growing number of runners train and race exclusively in racing flats, other minimalist shoes, or barefoot. This trend is known as minimalism. Running with minimalist shoes is useful to strengthen important muscle groups and improve running technique over time.

=== Uses ===
Because of the lack of support and cushioning in racing flats, they are typically not recommended for use by beginner runners or those who are not competing because of their lack of lower leg/foot strength. Studies show the locations of the load and pressure on different areas of the foot when using training shoes versus racing flats. The style of the shoes can alter the stress on the runner's foot and one should consider this when determining the best shoes for their personal level of skill. As an athlete progresses with their training, they will be able to use racing flats more safely and effectively.

== Manufacturers ==
Many companies that manufacture training shoes also manufacture racing flats. Because the market for racing flats is relatively small, companies only produce a limited selection of models. Large corporations might only produce 2 models of racing flats, one for fast track usage and another for distance road usage.

== See also ==
- List of shoe styles
- Comparison of orthotics
