= Allyson Felix =

American track and field athlete (born 1985)

Allyson Felix OLY
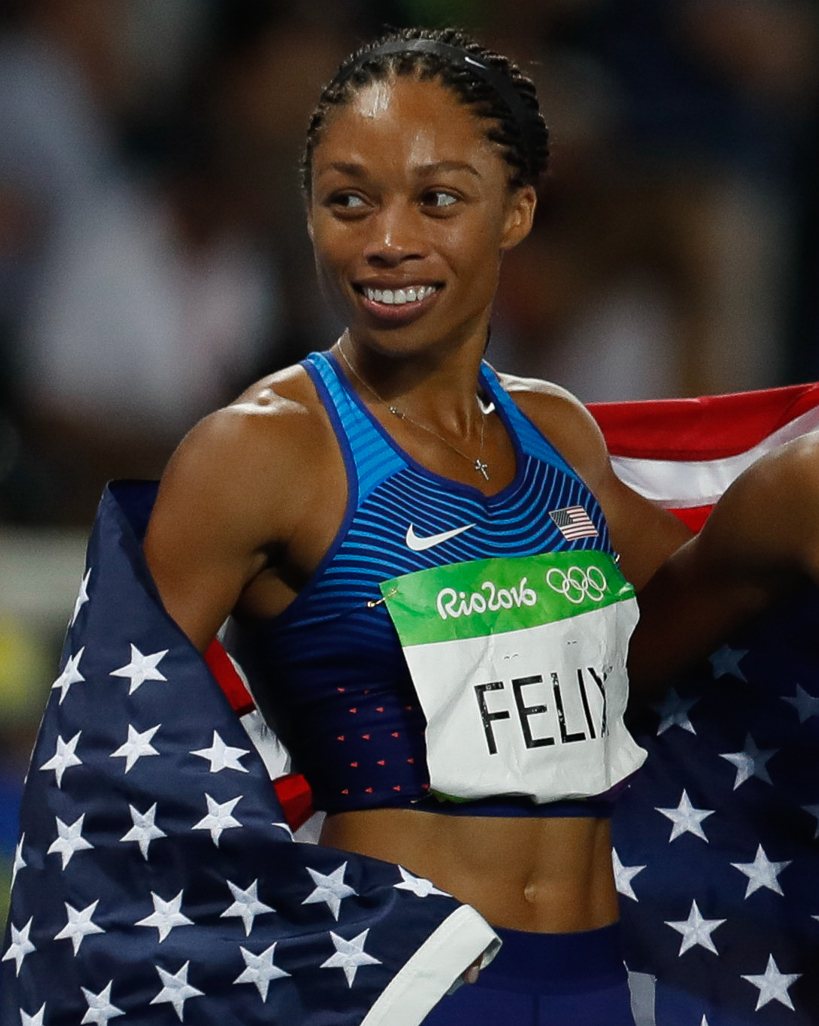
- Felix at the 2016 Rio Olympics

Personal information
- Full name: Allyson Michelle Felix
- Born: November 18, 1985 (age 41) Los Angeles, California, U.S.
- Home town: Santa Clarita, California, U.S.
- Education: University of Southern California (BA)
- Height: 5 ft 6 in (168 cm)
- Weight: 125 lb (57 kg)

Sport
- Country: United States
- Sport: Track and field
- Event: Sprint

Achievements and titles
- Personal bests: 100 m: 10.89 s (London 2012); 150 m: 16.36 s (Manchester 2013); 200 m: 21.69 s (Eugene 2012); 400 m: 49.26 s (Beijing 2015)
Medal record
Women's athletics
Representing the United States
Event	1st	2nd	3rd
Olympic Games	7	3	1
World Championships	14	3	3
World Indoor Championships	1	0	0
Total	22	6	4
Olympic Games
Gold medal – first place	2008 Beijing	4 × 400 m relay
Gold medal – first place	2012 London	200 m
Gold medal – first place	2012 London	4 × 100 m relay
Gold medal – first place	2012 London	4 × 400 m relay
Gold medal – first place	2016 Rio de Janeiro	4 × 100 m relay
Gold medal – first place	2016 Rio de Janeiro	4 × 400 m relay
Gold medal – first place	2020 Tokyo	4 × 400 m relay
Silver medal – second place	2004 Athens	200 m
Silver medal – second place	2008 Beijing	200 m
Silver medal – second place	2016 Rio de Janeiro	400 m
Bronze medal – third place	2020 Tokyo	400 m
World Championships
Gold medal – first place	2005 Helsinki	200 m
Gold medal – first place	2007 Osaka	200 m
Gold medal – first place	2007 Osaka	4 × 100 m relay
Gold medal – first place	2007 Osaka	4 × 400 m relay
Gold medal – first place	2009 Berlin	200 m
Gold medal – first place	2009 Berlin	4 × 400 m relay
Gold medal – first place	2011 Daegu	4 × 100 m relay
Gold medal – first place	2011 Daegu	4 × 400 m relay
Gold medal – first place	2015 Beijing	400 m
Gold medal – first place	2017 London	4 × 100 m relay
Gold medal – first place	2017 London	4 × 400 m relay
Gold medal – first place	2019 Doha	4 × 400 m relay
Gold medal – first place	2019 Doha	4 × 400 m mixed
Gold medal – first place	2022 Eugene	4 × 400 m relay
Silver medal – second place	2011 Daegu	400 m
Silver medal – second place	2015 Beijing	4 × 100 m relay
Silver medal – second place	2015 Beijing	4 × 400 m relay
Bronze medal – third place	2011 Daegu	200 m
Bronze medal – third place	2017 London	400 m
Bronze medal – third place	2022 Eugene	4 × 400 m mixed
World Indoor Championships
Gold medal – first place	2010 Doha	4 × 400 m relay
Diamond League
First place	2010	200 m
First place	2010	400 m
First place	2014	200 m
First place	2015	200 m

Allyson Michelle Felix (born November 18, 1985) is an American track and field athlete who competes in the 100 meters, 200 meters and 400 meters. Over 200 metres, she is the 2012 Olympic champion, a three-time world champion (2005–2009), and a two-time Olympic silver medalist (2004 and 2008). At 400 metres, she is the 2015 world champion, 2016 Olympic silver medalist, 2020 Olympic bronze medalist, 2011 world silver medalist and 2017 world bronze medalist. Across the short distances, Felix is a ten-time U.S. national champion.

She played a key role on the United States women's relay teams, winning six additional Olympic gold medals: four consecutive medals at 4 × 400 meters (2008, 2012, 2016, and 2020) and two at 4 × 100 meters (2012 and 2016). The 2012 and 2016 U.S. Olympic 4 × 100 m teams set a world record of 40.82 s and the second fastest time of 41.01 s, respectively. Felix became the first female track and field athlete to ever win seven Olympic gold medals in 2021. She is the most decorated woman and the most decorated American in Olympic track and field history, having earned 11 total medals from five consecutive Olympic Games. Felix is the most decorated athlete, male or female, in World Athletics Championships history with 20 career medals. With a combined Olympic and World Championship total of 31 medals, she is also the overall most decorated athlete in track and field history, with 12 medals from individual events and 19 from relays. Felix was the first athlete in track and field history to medal in 3 different relays, 4 × 100 m, 4 × 400 m and mixed 4 × 400 m.

Among Felix's notable performances, her 200 meters personal best of 21.69 seconds, which was set at the 2012 U.S. Olympic trials, ranked at the time as the third-fastest time ever run by an American woman and sixth-fastest time by a female athlete in history. She also ran a 47.72-second leg on the U.S. women's 4 × 400 m relay team at the 2015 World Championships, recording the fastest split ever by an American woman, and third-fastest split ever by a female athlete. She is one of few athletes to have run sub-11 s for the 100 m, sub-22 s for the 200 m and sub-50 s for the 400 m.

Felix, along with Alysia Montaño and Kara Goucher, is credited with stirring public outcry over Nike's refusal to guarantee salary protections for its pregnant athletes, prompting the sportswear brand to expand its maternity policy in 2019. Two years after her departure from Nike, she launched her own footwear company, Saysh, in June 2021. The same year, she became the first athlete in track and field history to win Olympic medals while wearing her own racing spikes, the Saysh Spike One. Having initially retired in 2022, Felix announced a comeback in 2026 to try to qualify for the 2028 Summer Olympics.

She was included in Time magazine's 100 Most Influential People of 2020 and 2021. In 2022, Felix received an honorary Doctor of Humane Letters degree from her alma mater USC and also served as the commencement speaker for that year's graduation ceremony. In July 2024, Felix was placed at number 63 on ESPN's list of the 100 greatest athletes of the 21st century.

== Early life ==
Allyson Felix was born on November 18, 1985, in Los Angeles, California. She is the daughter of Paul, an ordained minister and professor of New Testament at The Master's Seminary in Sun Valley, California, and Marlean, an elementary school teacher at Balboa Magnet Elementary. Her elder brother Wes Felix was also a sprinter, winning the 2002 USA Junior Championships in the 200 meters race and later, the Pac-10 championships in 2003 and 2004 as a collegiate athlete for USC. Wes now acts as the agent for his sister. Felix describes her running ability as a gift from God: "For me, my faith is the reason I run. I definitely feel I have this amazing gift that God has blessed me with, and it's all about using it to the best of my ability."

== Junior career ==
Allyson Felix attended Los Angeles Baptist High School in North Hills, California, where she was nicknamed "Chicken Legs" by her teammates, because the five-foot-six, 125-pound sprinter's body had skinny legs despite her strength. Her slightness belied her speed on the track and strength in the gym, as she could deadlift at least 270 pounds while still in high school. Felix credits much of her early success to her high school sprint coach, Jonathan Patton.

Felix began to discover her athletic talents after she tried out for track in the ninth grade. Just ten weeks after that first tryout, she finished seventh in the 200 meters at the CIF California State Meet. In the coming seasons, she became a five-time winner at the meet. In 2001, at the Debrecan World Youth Championships, Felix achieved her first international title in the 100 meters. In 2003, she was named the national girls' "High School Athlete of the Year" by Track and Field News. As a senior, Felix finished second in the 200 meters at the US Indoor Track & Field Championships. A few months later, in front of 50,000 fans in Mexico City, she ran 22.11 seconds, the fastest in history for a high school girl, though it could not count as a world junior record because there was no drug testing at the meet.

Felix graduated high school in 2003, making headlines by forgoing college eligibility to sign a professional contract with Adidas via her agent Nik Visger. Adidas paid her an undisclosed sum and picked up her college tuition at the University of Southern California. She graduated in May 2008 with a degree in elementary education.

== Professional ==
=== Early career ===
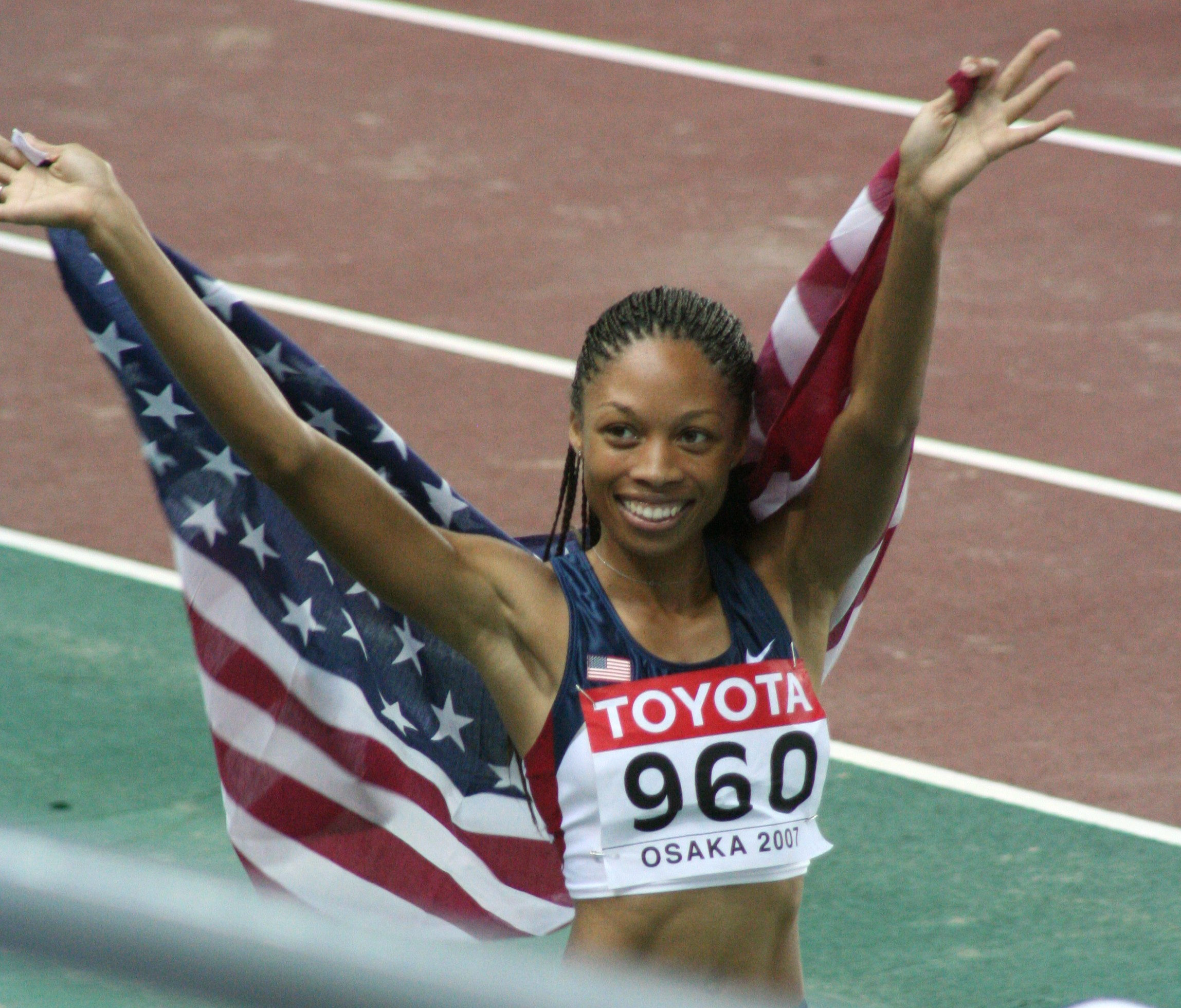
Felix celebrating her victory at the 2007 Osaka World Championships

At the 2003 U.S. national championships, the 17-year-old phenomenon finished second in the 200 meters sprint with a time of 22.59 seconds, earning her spot to the 2003 Paris World Championships. In the quarter-finals of the 200 meters in Paris, Felix finished sixth in 23.33 seconds.

At the age of 18, Felix earned an Olympic silver medal in the 200 meters at the 2004 Summer Olympics in Athens, behind Veronica Campbell of Jamaica; in doing so, she set a world junior record over 200 meters with her time of 22.18 seconds. After leaving Athens, Felix and her coach Pat Connolly, who also guided the 1984 Olympic 100 meters champion Evelyn Ashford, parted ways as Connolly moved back to Virginia and Felix cited difficulties training alone. The young sprinter then sought the tutelage of controversial sprint coach Bob Kersee, whom she would train under for the next 18 years.

Nineteen-year-old Felix became the youngest world champion ever in the 200 meters at the 2005 Helsinki World Championships and then successfully defended her world title in Osaka two years later. At the 2007 Osaka World Championships, Felix caught Jamaican rival, Veronica Campbell, on the bend and surged down the straightaway to finish in 21.81 seconds, dipping under the 22-second barrier for the first time in her career. After the final, Felix stated in the post-race interview: "I feel so good. I am so excited. I have been waiting for so long to run such a time, to run under 22 seconds. It has not been an easy road, but finally, I managed." At that time, she addressed her future, saying, "My next goal is not the world record, but gold in Beijing. I want to take it step-by-step. I might consider doing both – the 200 and the 400 meters – there." Days later, after partaking in the winning U.S. 4 × 100 meters relay and also the 4 × 400 meters relay, in which she unofficially split 48.01 seconds on the second leg, Felix became only the second female athlete, after Marita Koch in 1983, to win three gold medals at a single IAAF World Championships in Athletics.

=== 2008–09: First Olympic gold medal and third 200 m world title ===
Felix qualified for the 2008 Summer Olympics at the 2008 Olympic trials by winning the 200 meters sprint in 21.82 seconds, but narrowly missed qualifying for the 100 meters sprint. In the Olympic 200 meter final, despite running her season's best time in the 200 meters at 21.93 seconds, she again finished second to Campbell, who ran 21.74 seconds, the fastest time of the decade, to win the gold medal. Felix avenged her disappointing loss by regaining the lead for the U.S. women's 4 × 400 meters relay team during her 48.55-second leg, allowing Team USA to eventually win and earning her first Olympic gold medal.

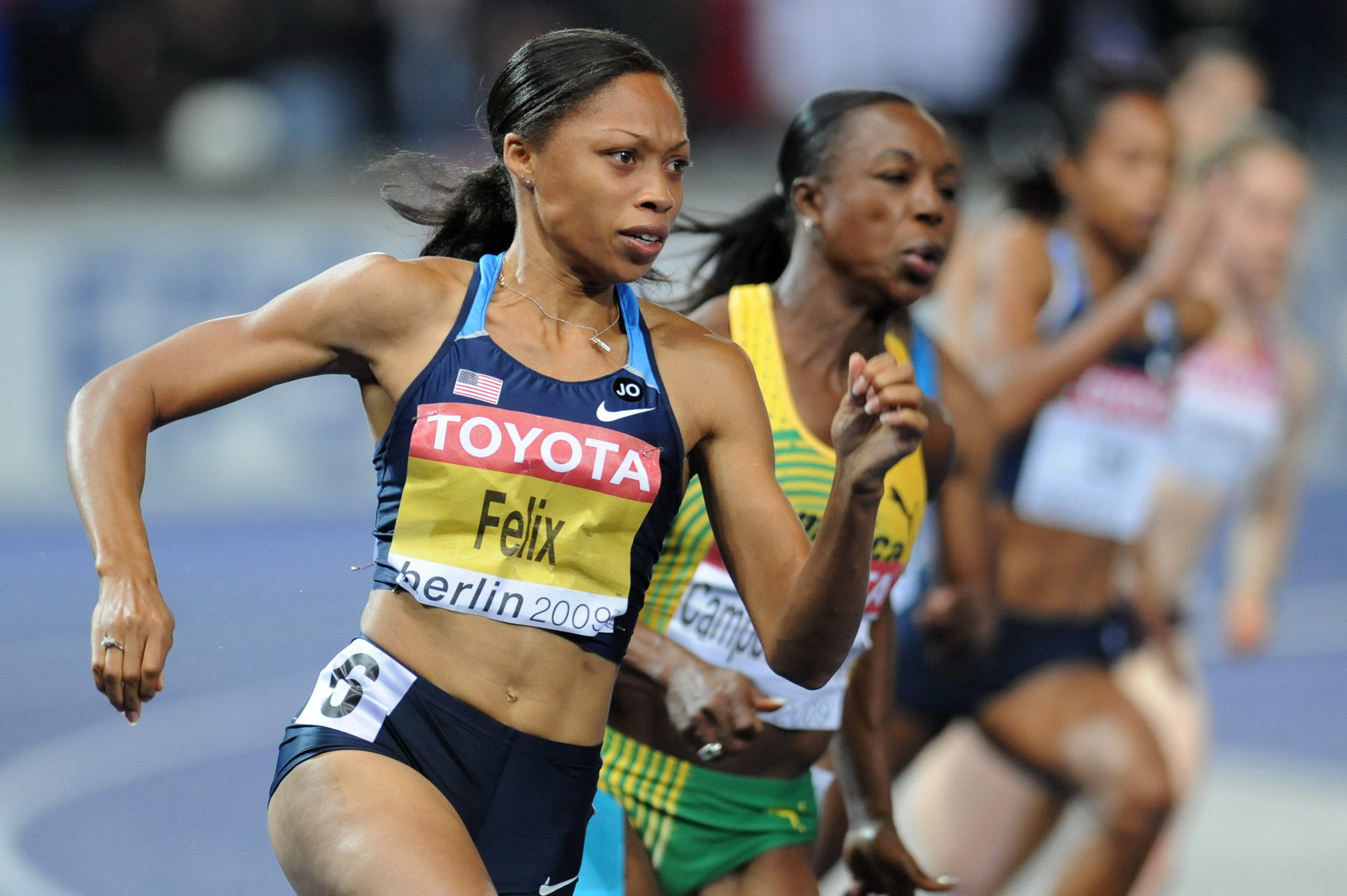
Felix during the 200 meters final at the 2009 Berlin World Championships

In the build-up to the 2009 World Championships in Athletics, Felix was part of a U.S. 4 × 100 meters relay team that ran the fastest women's sprint relay in twelve years. Lauryn Williams, Felix, Muna Lee and Carmelita Jeter finished with a time of 41.58 seconds, bringing them to eighth on the all-time list. In 2009, at merely 23 years old, Felix proceeded to claim her third 200-meter world championship gold medal, an unprecedented accomplishment in women's sprinting. Felix clocked 22.02 sec to comfortably beat Jamaica's Olympic 200-meter champion Veronica Campbell-Brown.

Afterwards she said, "It's really special to win a third world title. I wanted to do it in this stadium, represent my country and make Jesse Owens proud." But Felix admitted that she would rather have the one gold medal that she was missing. "I would love to trade my three world championships for your gold," Felix jokingly said to Veronica Campbell-Brown of Jamaica at the medalists' news conference, referring to the 2008 Olympic gold medal in the 200 meters, a race Felix was heavily favored to win. Still distressed over finishing second to Campbell-Brown in Beijing, Felix stated: "I don't think I ever want to get over it. I never want to be satisfied with losing." At the same time, she also commented, "I'm just grateful to have had success quickly, and sometimes I do have to pinch myself and realize all this has happened in not that much time." Felix later claimed another gold medal by running a 48.75-second leg on Team USA's victorious 4 × 400 meters relay team.

=== 2010–11: Four medals at the 2011 World Championships ===
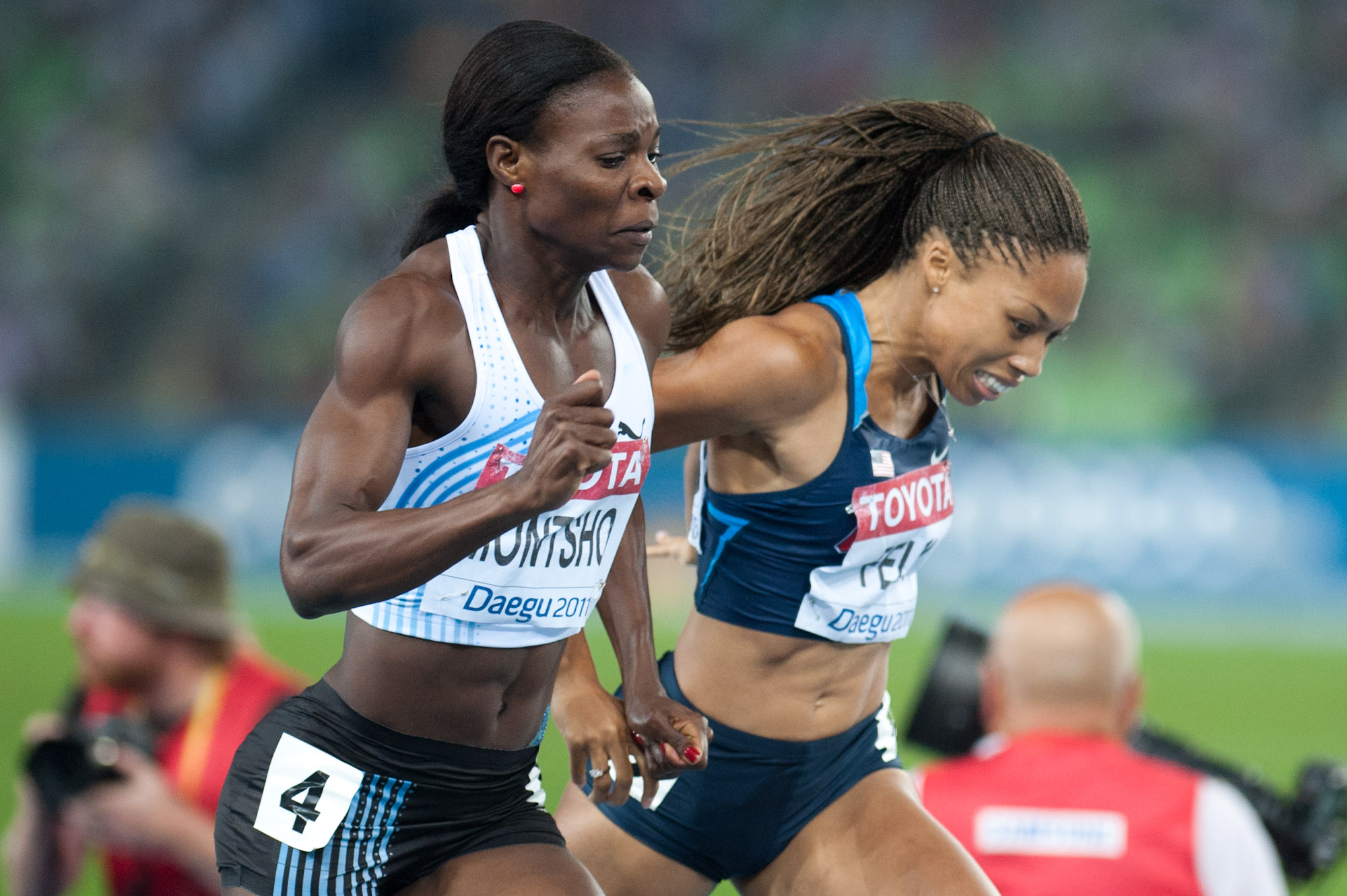
Felix and Montsho at the finish line in 2011 Daegu World Championships

In 2010, Felix focused on running more 400-meter races. Running the 200 meters and the 400 meters, she became the first person to win two IAAF Diamond League trophies in the same year. She continued her dominance by winning 21 out of 22 races, only losing to Veronica Campbell-Brown over 200 m at the New York Grand Prix. Felix also became the U.S. 100 meters champion, winning in 11.27 seconds against a strong −2.5 m/s headwind.

At the 2011 World Championships in Athletics, Felix ran in the 200 and 400 meters, as well as the 4 × 100 and 4 × 400 meters relay races. In the 400-meter event, Felix's best efforts yielded only a second-place finish despite straining down the homestretch to a personal best of 49.59 seconds, 0.03 behind winner Amantle Montsho of Botswana. In the 200-meter final, Felix finished third in a time of 22.42 seconds, with Campbell-Brown winning gold and Carmelita Jeter winning silver. In the relay events, Felix ran the second leg in both the 4 × 100 meters and 4 × 400 meters. Team USA won both events, attaining world-leading times in both finals as Felix added two world championship gold medals to her collection. The 25-year-old American sprinter was the only athlete to leave Daegu with four medals.

=== 2012–13: Three Olympic golds ===
In 2012, Felix returned to the Olympic trials, choosing to race the 100 meters in addition to her main event, the 200 meters. The top three finishers in each event qualified for the 2012 Summer Olympics team. In the 100 meters final, she ran 11.07 seconds, placing third, but not without controversy. Officials ruled that Felix and her training partner Jeneba Tarmoh were in a dead heat for third place, the final qualification position, after initially declaring Tarmoh ahead. A run-off between Tarmoh and Felix was scheduled, but Tarmoh eventually withdrew due to emotional and physical fatigue, conceding the final 100-meter spot to Felix. In the 200 meters final at the 2012 Olympic trials, Felix recorded a personal best and a meet record of 21.69 seconds, the third-fastest time an American woman had ever run and the fourth-fastest ever clocked by a female athlete up until that point. Carmelita Jeter and Sanya Richards-Ross placed second and third, respectively.

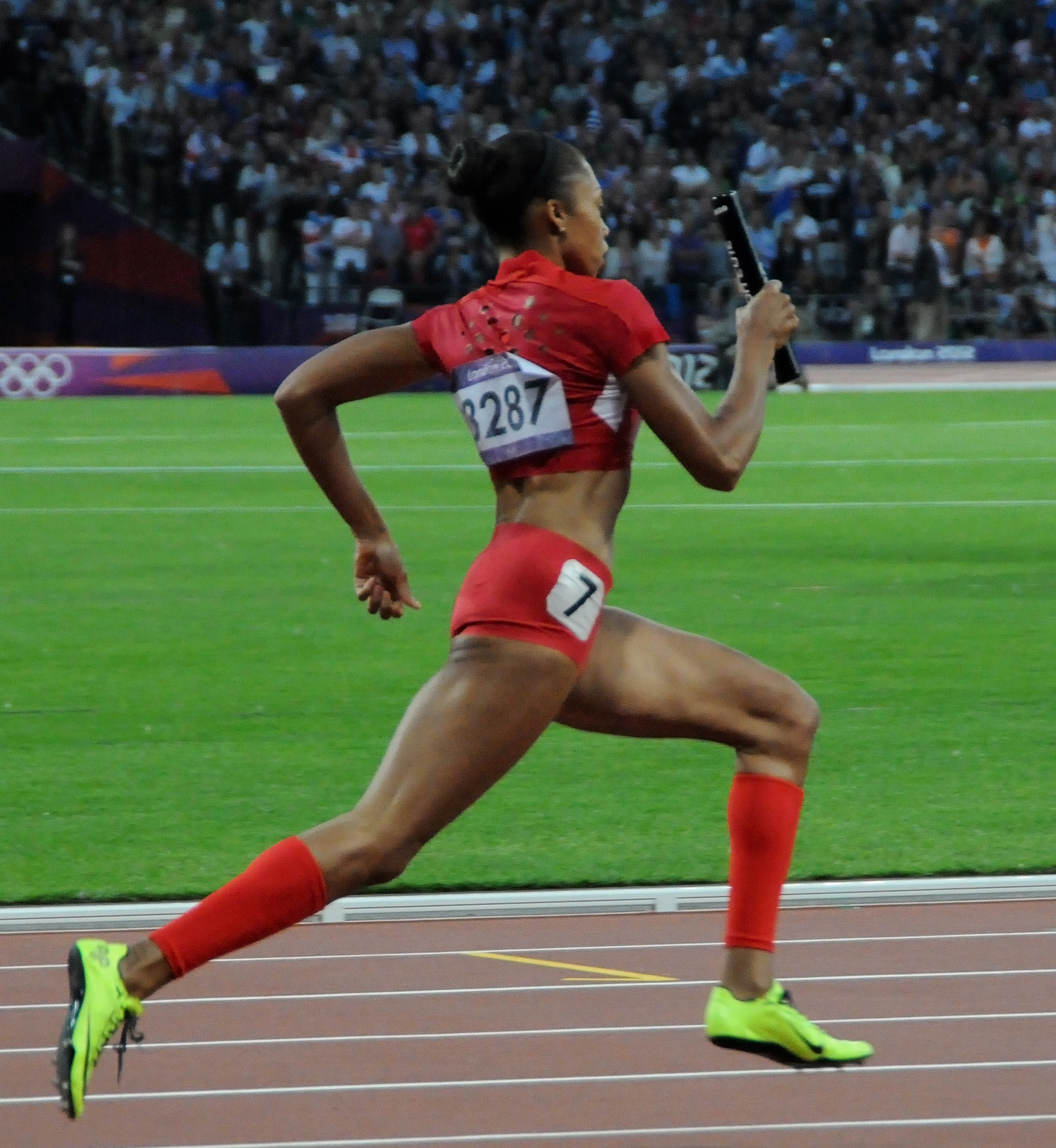
Felix running second leg on the U.S. 4 × 400 meters relay team at the 2012 London Olympics

At the 2012 Summer Olympics, Felix competed in four events: 100 meters, 200 meters, 4 × 100 meters relay, and 4 × 400 meters relay, placing fifth in the 100 meters and winning gold in the other three, thus becoming the first American woman to win three golds in athletics at an Olympics since Florence Griffith-Joyner at the 1988 Summer Olympics. In her first final, the 100 meters final, she placed fifth with a personal best of 10.89 seconds. The 200 meters final, a race she lost twice at the 2004 and 2008 Summer Olympics to Jamaican rival Veronica Campbell-Brown, proved to be her successful third attempt as she won in 21.88 seconds, outracing a stacked field that included Campbell-Brown, 2012 Olympic 100 meters champion Shelly-Ann Fraser-Pryce, 2012 Olympic 100 meters silver medalist Carmelita Jeter, and 2012 Olympic 400 meters champion Sanya Richards-Ross. Felix pushed out of the blocks with a strong start and was on par with the Jamaican athletes coming off of the curve before pulling away in the final 50 meters to clinch her long-awaited individual Olympic gold medal. Fraser-Pryce won silver and American compatriot Jeter took the bronze medal.

Felix took to the track again as part of the women's 4 × 100 meters relay team alongside Tianna Madison, Bianca Knight, and Jeter. The foursome won with a time of 40.82 seconds, breaking the long-held world record of 41.37 seconds, set by East Germany in October 1985. On the final night of Olympic athletics, Felix ran a 48.2-second leg on the U.S. women's 4 × 400 meters relay team that included DeeDee Trotter, Francena McCorory, and Richards-Ross, winning in a time of 3:16.87, the third-fastest time in Olympic history behind the Soviet Union and the United States at the 1988 Summer Olympics, and the fifth-fastest time overall, up until that point.

At the 2013 World Championships in Moscow, Felix entered in the 200 meters and was expected to also appear in the relays, but succumbed to a hamstring injury in the 200 meters final and was carried off the track by her brother. The race was won by Fraser-Pryce.

=== 2014–15: World 400 m title ===
After a nine-month layoff due to a hamstring injury, Felix resumed competition in the 400 meters at the Shanghai Diamond League meet in May 2014, in which she finished fifth with a time of 50.81 seconds. She later competed in the 200 meters at the Prefontaine Classic meet on 31 May, finishing third with a season's best of 22.44 seconds.

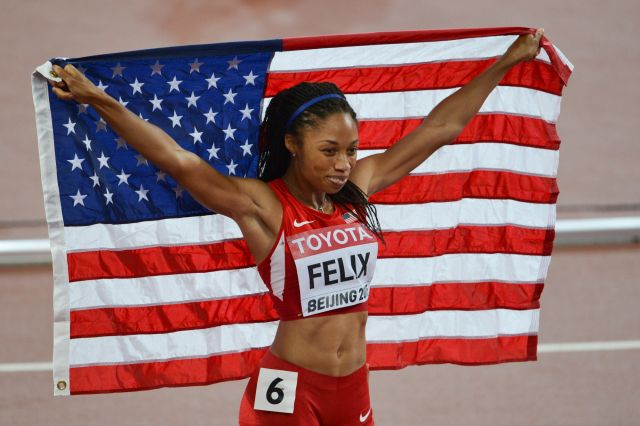
Felix after her victory at the 2015 Beijing World Championships.

As the winner of the 2014 IAAF Diamond League 200-meter title, Felix received a bye into the 2015 World Championships in Athletics. Obligated to participate in the 2015 USA Outdoor Track and Field Championships but not required to run the 200 meters, she opted for the 400 meters. Felix won the event in 50.19 seconds with a late surge from fourth place at the 300-meter mark, catching Natasha Hastings right before the finish line to earn her ninth U.S. championship title. World number one ranked Francena McCorory and number two Sanya Richards-Ross failed to qualify for the 2015 Beijing World Championships.

The 2015 Beijing World Championships schedule placed the 400-meter final just over an hour after the 200-meter semi-finals, making it virtually impossible to perform to world championship level in both events. As of July 1, Felix held the fastest seed time in both the 400 (0.11 over the fastest competitor) and 200 (0.22 over the fastest competitor), leaving her with a difficult choice as to which event to put her full effort into. Felix eventually chose the 400 meters and later triumphed in the event final with a personal best of 49.26 seconds. She dominated the race from beginning to end, making up the stagger from the start of the gun and never relinquishing her lead to claim the 400 meters title. In doing so, Felix became the first woman to win world titles in the 200 meters and the 400 meters. Additionally, she has now won the most world championship gold medals, and most overall world championship medals, out of any American track and field athlete. She continued to add to her medal collection by earning silver medals in both the 4 × 100 meters relay and 4 × 400 meters relay. In the latter race, Felix received the baton with a significant deficit to the leading Jamaican team, prompting her to sprint a historic split time of 47.72 seconds to regain the lead for the American women before the final handoff. This was the fastest 4 × 400 meters split ever recorded by an American woman and third-fastest 4 × 400 meters split ever by any female athlete, after Jarmila Kratochvílová and Marita Koch. Running the final leg, Francena McCorory failed to hold onto the lead and was overtaken by Novlene Williams-Mills in the final meters.

=== 2016–17: Two Olympic and World titles ===
Felix began her 2016 season with an uncharacteristically slow start after a gym accident in April, when she dropped from a pull-up bar and landed awkwardly, twisting her right ankle and tearing multiple ligaments. Felix was slated to run in a Diamond League meet in Doha as well as the Prefontaine Classic, but pulled out of both meets. In early June, she ran the 400 meters in 51.23 seconds at a low-key San Diego meet.

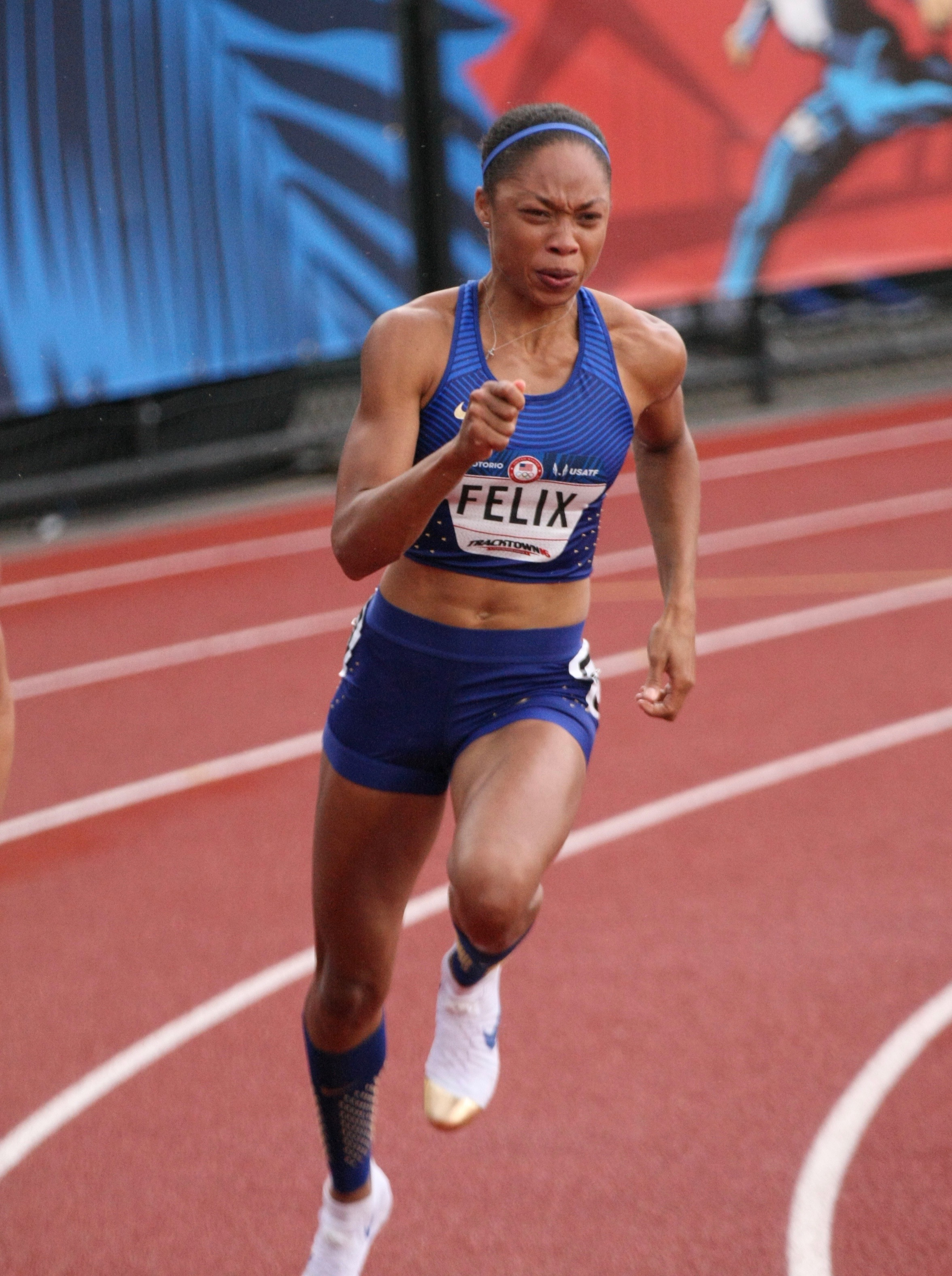
Felix at 2016 U.S. Olympic Trials

Still dealing with the physical repercussions from the accident, Felix raced the 200 meters and 400 meters anyway at the 2016 Olympic Trials in Eugene, Oregon, attempting to fulfill her goal of completing a 200–400 meters double victory at the 2016 Rio de Janeiro Olympics. In the 400 meters trials final, she surged from the middle of the pack down the homestretch and overtook the field in the final meters, recording a world-leading time of 49.68 seconds. Then, in the 200 meters final, the lack of speed work due to injury eventually caught up with her as she was narrowly edged out by Jenna Prandini, who dove across the finish line to secure the third and final spot on the team, beating Felix by 0.01 seconds (22.53 to 22.54 seconds). Felix took the rest of July and early part of August off to give her ankle more time to heal while she continued preparations for the Olympics.

At the 2016 Rio de Janeiro Olympics, Felix bumped her overall Olympic haul to nine overall medals: six golds and three silvers, tying Jamaican legend Merlene Ottey's record for the most Olympic medals won by a female track and field athlete, although most of Ottey's medal collection consists of individual medals. Felix's hope of winning the 400 meters Olympic gold medal came up short after she lost by 0.07 to Shaunae Miller of the Bahamas, who made a legal but unusual dive across the finish line as Felix was quickly closing the distance. Felix recovered from the disappointing performance to win two golds with the U.S. 4 × 100 meters and 4 × 400 meters relay teams. The 4 × 100 meters relay win drew much controversy, as Team USA was initially disqualified in their semi-final run after Felix had dropped the baton during the handoff attempt to English Gardner. However, replays showed that the Brazilian sprinter in the neighboring lane swung her arm and accidentally impeded Felix right before the handoff, causing her to lose her balance. After the appeal was accepted, Team USA was awarded a solo run the next day. With a successful time trial, Felix and her teammates advanced to the final, where they won in 41.01 seconds, the second-fastest 4 × 100 meters relay time in history.

The following year, during the 2017 World Championships in London, Felix added three more medals to her collection, cementing her position as the most decorated athlete in IAAF World Championships history. Felix equaled Merlene Ottey's and Usain Bolt's 14 medal tally by winning a bronze medal in the 400-meter final with a time of 50.08 seconds. She admitted that the result was disappointing, as she was hoping to defend her title in the discipline. Just a month prior to the championships, Felix had won the London's Diamond League meet held at the same track with a world-leading time of 49.65 seconds. Felix earned two additional gold medals by partaking in the 4 × 100 relay and also the 4 × 400 meters relay, in which she ran a 48.7-second leg, bringing her tally up to 16 world championship medals.

=== 2018–19 ===
==== Pregnancy emergency ====
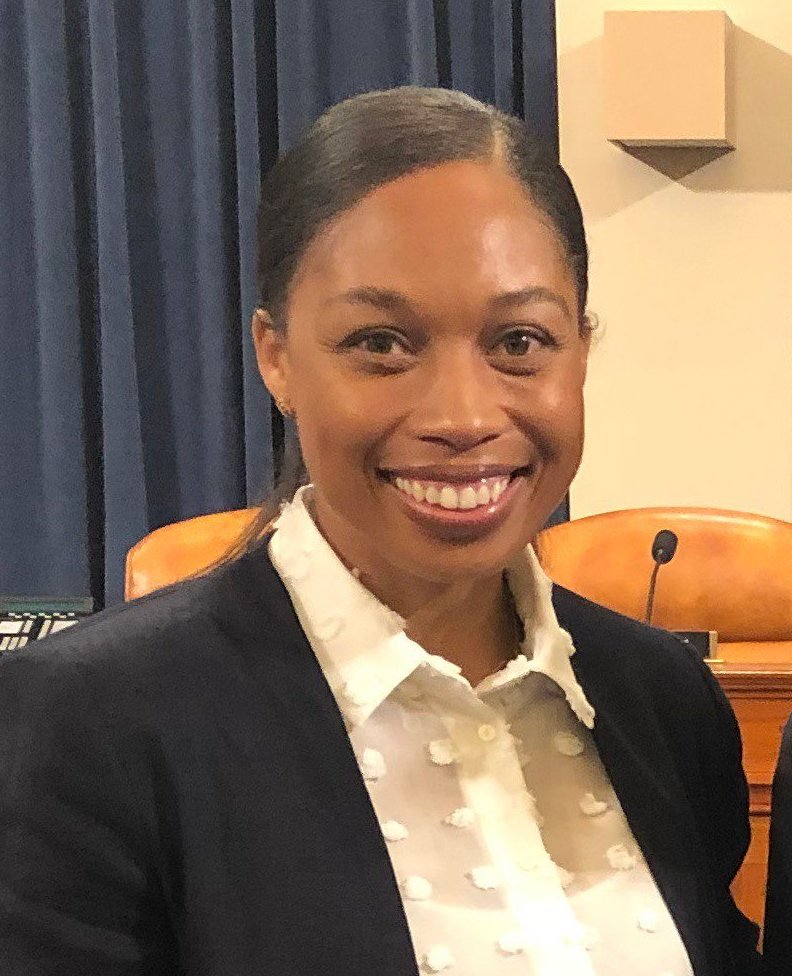
Felix at a 2019 U.S. House hearing

Felix reduced her racing schedule in 2018, stating: "In the 19 years that I've been running track, I've never taken a break. Never had a year where I took it easy. Now that this is kind of a year without a championship, I've had to force myself to have a different approach because my goal is 2020. So, if you guys don't see me at as many of the races as I usually run, don't worry. I'm fine. I'm just challenging myself to be smarter." Later in December 2018, Felix revealed her difficult pregnancy story to espnW. During her 32nd-week pregnancy checkup, doctors discovered that Felix had developed pre-eclampsia, a condition that is disproportionately prevalent in African-American women and is marked by high blood pressure along with potentially harmful childbirth effects. With the baby's heart rate steadily decreasing, Felix had to deliver her premature daughter via emergency C-section within 48 hours. Motivated by her life-threatening experience, Felix testified before the United States House Committee on Ways and Means on the topic of the black maternal mortality crisis: "Research shows that racial bias in our maternal health care system includes things like providers spending less time with Black mothers, underestimating the pain of their Black patients, ignoring symptoms and dismissing complaints."

==== Nike controversy ====
Felix furthered her maternal advocacy work in May 2019 by penning an op-ed for The New York Times, accusing her longtime sponsor Nike of refusing to guarantee salary protections for female athletes in the months following pregnancy. Her story underscored the earlier allegations made by her former Nike teammates Alysia Montaño and Kara Goucher regarding their pregnancy disputes with the sportswear company. In the article, Felix explained that after her contract ended in December 2017, she and Nike negotiated for a contract renewal. Planning to start a family in 2018, Felix asked Nike for written financial security, in case her performance yielded subpar results while recovering from childbirth; the negotiators declined after already offering a 70 percent pay cut in this contract proposal. Soon after, Felix left and signed a clothing sponsorship deal with the Gap Inc.–owned apparel company Athleta in July 2019, becoming their first sponsored athlete. Following the public controversy, Nike altered their maternal policy in August 2019, promising to not apply any performance-related salary reductions for 18 consecutive months, starting eight months before the due date. During this period, the sportswear company would also not float the possibility of termination if the athlete chooses to not race due to pregnancy.

==== Return to competition ====
In July 2019, Felix competed in her first race since giving birth in November 2018, finishing sixth in the 400-meter sprint at the U.S. national championships in Des Moines, Iowa. Although failing to qualify into the individual 400-meter event for the 2019 Doha World Championships, Felix's sixth-place finish still placed her in the U.S. 4 × 400 meters relay pool. In the first-ever mixed-gender 4 × 400 meters relay at the world championships, Felix competed with Michael Cherry, Wilbert London, and Courtney Okolo to set a world record time of 3:09.34. Felix ran a 50.4-second split for her leg. She earned another gold medal as a runner in the preliminary heats for the U.S. women's 4 × 400 meters relay, although she was not selected to participate in the final. With her 12th and 13th world championship gold medals, Felix surpassed Usain Bolt for the most golds by any athlete in World Athletics Championships history.

=== 2020–2022: 2020 Olympics ===
Felix trained during the COVID-19 pandemic with the aim of qualifying for her fifth Olympic Games – her first as a mother. She completed workouts on streets, empty soccer fields, and beaches after Gavin Newsom's quarantine measures were first enacted throughout California in March 2020. A former participant in the US Anti-Doping Agency's "Project Believe" program in 2008, she volunteered again for "Project Believe 2020" to help test an unprecedented sample collection procedure for athletes during the coronavirus stay-at-home orders.

==== Founding Saysh ====
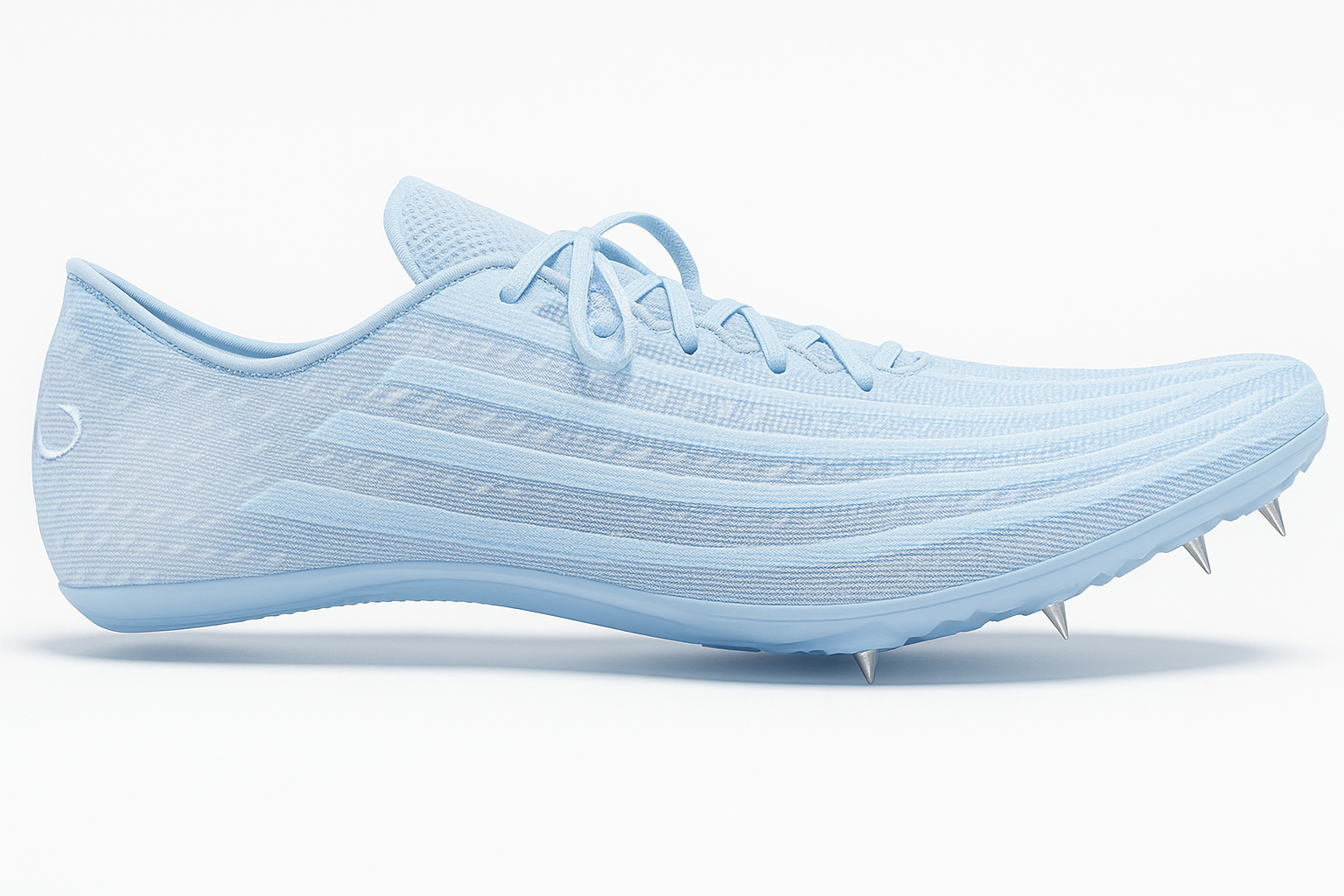
The Saysh Spike One track spike (2021 Prototype), worn by Allyson Felix at the Tokyo 2020 Olympics, winning a bronze medal in the 400 metres and a gold in the 4 × 400 metre relay while wearing the shoe.

In June 2021, two years after she publicized her contract dispute with Nike, Felix launched her own footwear company, Saysh, and began wearing spikes created by the brand into competitions. Within the same month, at the U.S. Olympic trials, the 35-year-old American qualified for the 400 meters individual event by finishing second with a time of 50.02 seconds, a new masters athletics record (35–40 age group) and also her fastest time since July 2017.

==== Medal Record ====
Leading up to the 400 meters final of the Tokyo 2020 Olympics, some doubted that Felix would stand on the podium again for her final individual Olympic event due to her age, U.S. Olympics trials performance, and semi-final time. Every finalist in the 400 meters final ran sub-50 seconds in their semi-final, with Felix running the second-slowest qualifying time of 49.89 seconds. Despite the odds, Felix ran 49.46 seconds in the final to claim the bronze medal, her 10th overall Olympic medal. This accomplishment lowered her 400-meter masters athletics record, tied her with Carl Lewis as the most decorated American track and field Olympian, and broke her tie with Merlene Ottey as the most decorated female track and field Olympian. Felix concluded her Olympic career after winning gold in the women's 4 × 400 meters final, alongside a team that included Sydney McLaughlin, Dalilah Muhammad, and Athing Mu. This 11th Olympic medal broke Felix's tie with Carl Lewis and officially established her as the most decorated American track and field athlete in Olympic history.

==== Retirement ====
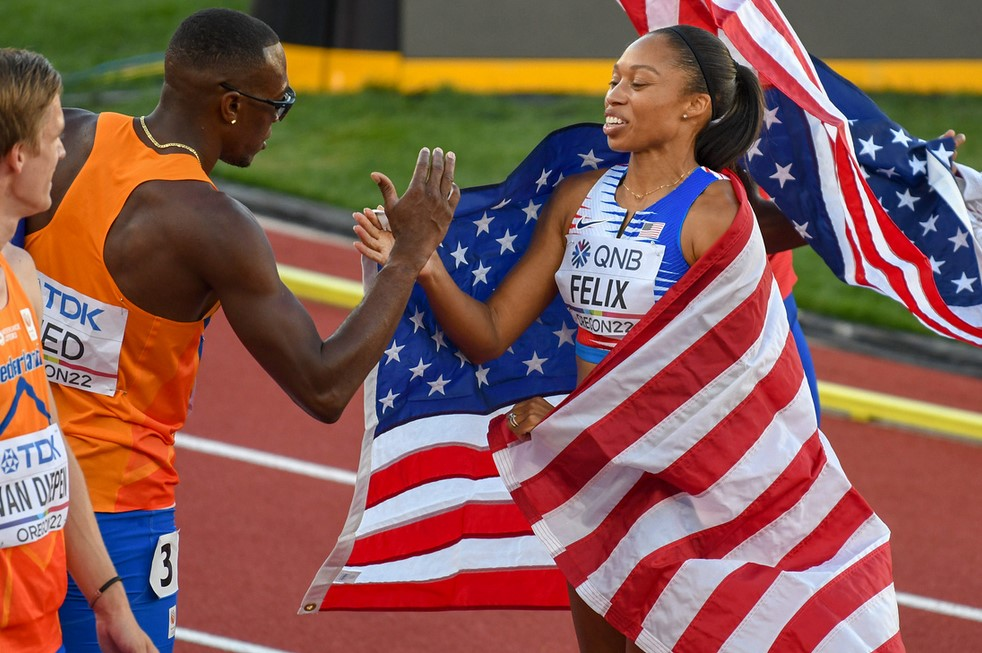
Felix after winning gold in the mixed 4 × 400 meters relay at the 2022 World Championships.

In April 2022, Felix announced that she would retire at the end of that year's season. Her last competition was the World Athletics Championships in Eugene in July 2022, where she won gold in the women's 4 × 400 meters relay and bronze in the mixed 4 × 400 meters relay.

=== 2023-present ===
==== Exit from retirement ====
In April 2026, Felix announced her intention to come out of retirement with the aim of competing in front of a home crowd at the 2028 Summer Olympics in Los Angeles.

== Achievements ==
Allyson Felix is a five-time recipient of the Jesse Owens/Jackie Joyner Kersee Award, an accolade given by USA Track & Field to commend the chosen athlete of the year. She won the award for the first time in 2005, and then again in 2007, 2010, 2012 and 2015. After her success at the 2012 London Olympics, Felix received the 2012 IAAF Female World Athlete of the Year award. In 2022, Felix received the Golden Plate Award of the American Academy of Achievement.

=== Personal bests ===
Event	Time (seconds)	Venue	Date
60 meters	7.10	Fayetteville, Arkansas, United States	February 12, 2012
100 meters	10.89	London, United Kingdom	August 4, 2012
150 meters	16.28	Osaka, Japan	August 31, 2007
200 meters	21.69	Eugene, United States	June 30, 2012
300 meters	36.33	Fayetteville, Arkansas, United States	February 9, 2007
400 meters	49.26	Beijing, China	August 27, 2015

- At the 2012 Summer Olympics Felix ran the second leg of the 4 × 400 meters relay in a time of 48.2 seconds.
- At the 2015 World Championships Felix ran the third leg of the 4 × 400 meters relay in a time of 47.72 seconds, which is the fastest 4 × 400 meters split ever by an American woman and third-fastest 4 × 400 meters split ever by any female athlete, after Jarmila Kratochvílová and Marita Koch.

=== National titles ===
- Six-time national 200 meters champion – 2004 (22.28), 2005 (22.13), 2007 (22.34), 2008 (21.82), 2009 (22.02), 2012 (21.69)
- Three-time national 400 meters champion – 2011 (50.40), 2015 (50.05), 2016 (49.68)
- U.S. national 100 meters champion – 2010 (11.27 with −2.5 m/s headwind)

Notes: The 2004, 2008, 2012, and 2016 U.S. championships double as the U.S. Olympic track and field trials. Felix is the first woman ever to win U.S. national titles in the 100 meters, 200 meters, and 400 meters in her career. She is also the second American woman, after Chandra Cheeseborough, to ever qualify for the Olympics (by placing in the top three) in the 100 meters, 200 meters, and 400 meters during her career.

=== International competitions ===
Representing the United States
Year	Competition	Venue	Position	Event	Time
2001	World Youth Championships	Debrecen, Hungary	1st	100 m	11.57
2001	World Youth Championships	Debrecen, Hungary	1st	Medley relay	2:03.83
2002	World Junior Championships	Kingston, Jamaica	5th	200 m	23.48
2002	World Junior Championships	Kingston, Jamaica	2nd (semis)	4 × 100 m relay	43.92 (Note: Time from the heats; Felix was replaced in the final.)
2003	Pan American Games	Santo Domingo, Dominican Republic	3rd	200 m	22.93
2003	Pan American Games	Santo Domingo, Dominican Republic	1st	4 × 100 m relay	43.06
2003	World Championships	Paris, France	6th (quarter-finals)	200 m	23.33
2004	Olympic Games	Athens, Greece	2nd	200 m	22.18
2005	World Championships	Helsinki, Finland	1st	200 m	22.16
2006	World Athletics Final	Stuttgart, Germany	1st	200 m	22.11
2006	World Athletics Final	Stuttgart, Germany	3rd	100 m	11.07
2007	World Championships	Osaka, Japan	1st	200 m	21.81
2007	World Championships	Osaka, Japan	1st	4 × 100 m relay	41.98
2007	World Championships	Osaka, Japan	1st	4 × 400 m relay	3:18.55
2008	Olympic Games	Beijing, China	2nd	200 m	21.93
2008	Olympic Games	Beijing, China	1st	4 × 400 m relay	3:18.54
2009	World Championships	Berlin, Germany	1st	200 m	22.02
2009	World Championships	Berlin, Germany	1st	4 × 400 m relay	3:17.83
2010	World Indoor Championships	Doha, Qatar	1st	4 × 400 m relay	3:27.34
2011	World Championships	Daegu, South Korea	3rd	200 m	22.42
2011	World Championships	Daegu, South Korea	2nd	400 m	49.59
2011	World Championships	Daegu, South Korea	1st	4 × 100 m relay	41.56
2011	World Championships	Daegu, South Korea	1st	4 × 400 m relay	3:18.09
2012	Olympic Games	London, United Kingdom	5th	100 m	10.89
2012	Olympic Games	London, United Kingdom	1st	200 m	21.88
2012	Olympic Games	London, United Kingdom	1st	4 × 100 m relay	40.82 OR WR
2012	Olympic Games	London, United Kingdom	1st	4 × 400 m relay	3:16.88
2013	World Championships	Moscow, Russia	DNF	200 m	Injured
2015	World Relays	Nassau, Bahamas	2nd	4 × 100 m relay	42.32
2015	World Championships	Beijing, China	1st	400 m	49.26
2015	World Championships	Beijing, China	2nd	4 × 100 m relay	41.68
2015	World Championships	Beijing, China	2nd	4 × 400 m relay	3:19.44
2016	Olympic Games	Rio de Janeiro, Brazil	2nd	400 m	49.51
2016	Olympic Games	Rio de Janeiro, Brazil	1st	4 × 100 m relay	41.01
2016	Olympic Games	Rio de Janeiro, Brazil	1st	4 × 400 m relay	3:19.06
2017	World Championships	London, United Kingdom	3rd	400 m	50.08
2017	World Championships	London, United Kingdom	1st	4 × 100 m relay	41.82
2017	World Championships	London, United Kingdom	1st	4 × 400 m relay	3:19.02
2019	World Championships	Doha, Qatar	1st	4 × 400 m mixed relay	3:09.34 WR
2019	World Championships	Doha, Qatar	1st (heats)	4 × 400 m relay	3:22.96
2021	Olympic Games	Tokyo, Japan	3rd	400 m	49.46 MWR
2021	Olympic Games	Tokyo, Japan	1st	4 × 400 m relay	3:16.85
2022	World Championships	Eugene, Oregon, USA	3rd	4 × 400 m mixed relay	3:10.16 SB
2022	World Championships	Eugene, Oregon, USA	1st (heats)	4 × 400 m relay	3:23.38

=== Golden League wins ===
- 2008 (2) – Rome (400 m), Zurich (200 m)

=== Diamond League wins ===
- 2010 (7) – Doha (400 m), Eugene (400 m), Paris (200 m), Stockholm (200 m), London (400 m), Zürich (400 m), Brussels (200 m)
- 2011 (3) – Doha (400 m), Rome (400 m), New York (200 m)
- 2012 (2) – Doha (100 m), Eugene (200 m)
- 2013 (1) – London (200 m)
- 2014 (3) – Oslo (200 m), Stockholm (200 m), Brussels (200 m)
- 2015 (2) – Doha (200 m), Lausanne (200 m)
- 2017 (1) – London (400 m)

=== Diamond League titles ===
- 2010 Overall 200 m Diamond Race Title
- 2010 Overall 400 m Diamond Race Title
- 2014 Overall 200 m Diamond Race Title
- 2015 Overall 200 m Diamond Race Title

== Sports advocacy ==
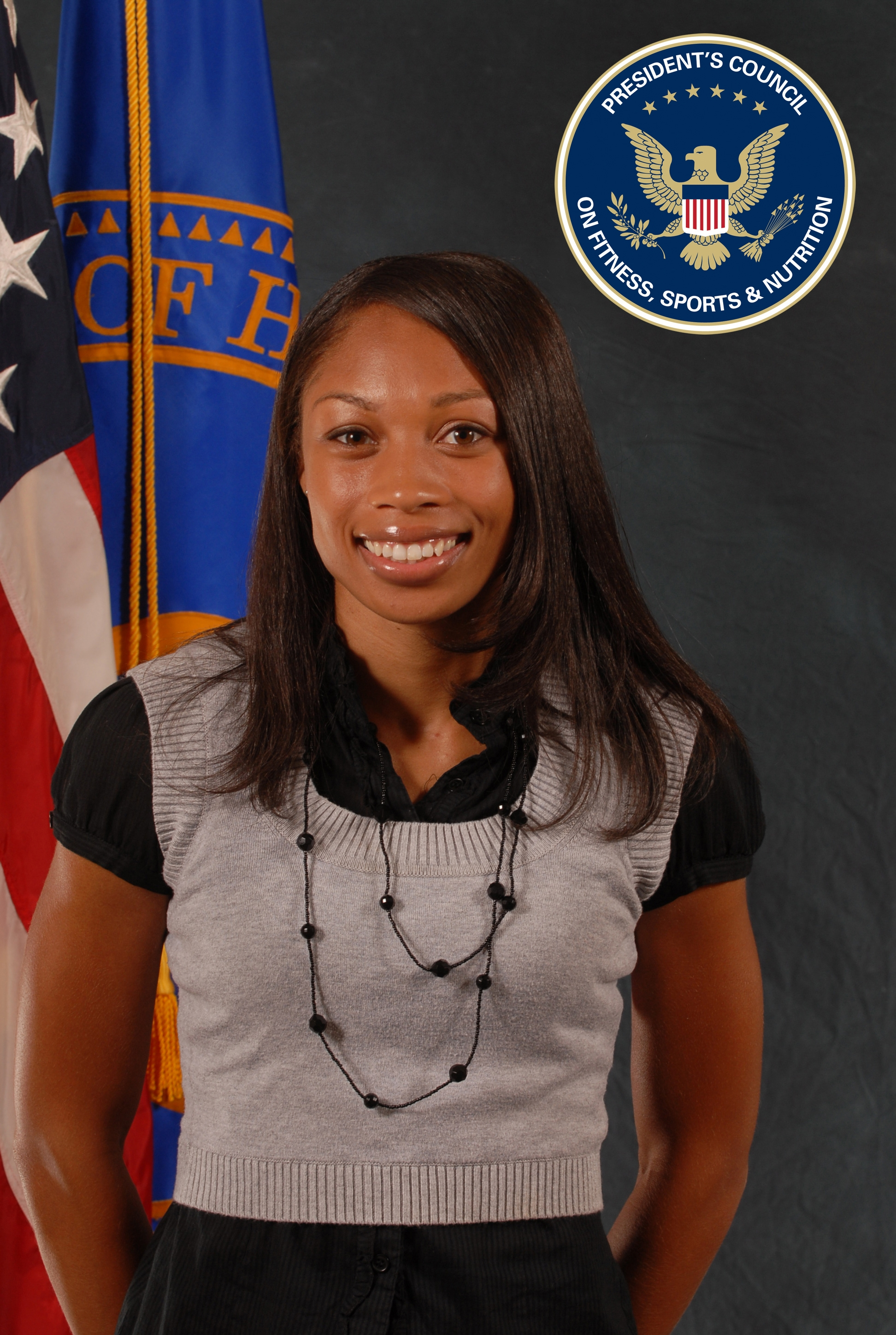
Felix as a member of the President's Council on Fitness, Sports, and Nutrition

Under the Obama administration, Felix served on the President's Council on Fitness, Sports, and Nutrition, an advisory committee dedicated to creating affordable and sustainable physical activity and nutrition programs to encourage healthy lifestyles among Americans of all ages. As a councilmember, she appeared in short clips promoting healthy school breakfasts, mediated youth panels, and participated in a "Let's Move! Active Schools" event hosted by First Lady Michelle Obama.

In November 2014, Felix traveled to Brazil as a Sports Diplomacy Sports Envoy for the U.S. Department of State. In this function, she worked with Josh George to conduct clinics, speeches and other events for 510 youth, many of whom had disabilities or came from marginalized communities. The program was designed to remove barriers and create activities that benefit audiences with and without disabilities, while speaking with a young, at-risk public about important life and sports values, such as respect, discipline and overcoming adversity.

== Awards ==
- World Athletics Awards

World Athlete of the Year (Women)：2012

- In December 2024, Allyson Felix was included on the BBC's 100 Women list.

== Personal life ==
She is married to American sprinter and hurdler Kenneth Ferguson. They have a daughter, born in 2018, and a son, born in 2024. Felix is a Christian. She is an honorary member of the Alpha Kappa Alpha.

== See also ==
- List of multiple Olympic gold medalists in one event

Awards
Preceded by No Award Given	Women's Track & Field ESPY Award; 2006	Succeeded by No Award Given
Preceded by Sally Pearson	IAAF World Athlete of the Year; 2012	Succeeded by Shelly-Ann Fraser-Pryce
Achievements
Preceded by Debbie Ferguson; Veronica Campbell; Sherone Simpson	Women's 200 m Best Year Performance; 2003; 2005; 2007	Succeeded by Veronica Campbell; Sherone Simpson; Veronica Campbell
