= Jacob (surname) =

Jacob is a surname, ultimately from the Biblical figure Jacob. Jakob is the main German form of the name. The surname Jacob (including variant and regional forms, such as Jakob or Jakub) is used as an English, German, Ashkenazi Jewish, Slovenian, Croatian, Slovak, Czech, Hungarian, Portuguese, French, Dutch, and Christian South Indian surname.

For the meaning of the name, see Jacob (name).

== Notable people with the surname Jacob ==
=== A–G ===
- Abe Jacob (born 1944), American sound designer
- Alaric Jacob (1909–1995), British journalist and author
- Alek Jacob (born 1998), American baseball player
- Alexander Malcolm Jacob (1849–1921), diamond and gemstone trader, sold the Jacob Diamond
- Anund Jacob (c. 1010–1050), a.k.a. Anund Jakob, King of Sweden
- Archibald Jacob (1829–1900), Australian politician
- Archibald Jacob, (1888-1959), British musician, brother of Gordon Jacob
- Ariana Jacob, American artist
- Caroline Jacob (1861–1940), South Australian school principal and owner
- Catherine Jacob (actress) (born 1956), French actress
- Catherine Jacob (journalist) (born 1976), British broadcast journalist and news presenter
- Charles Jacob (geologist) (1878–1962), French geologist
- Charles Jacob (stockbroker) (1921–2015), British stockbroker, promoter of ethical investment
- Charles Donald Jacob (1838–1898), American politician and diplomat
- Christian Jacob (politician) (born 1959), French politician
- Christy Jacob (born 1944), Irish hurler
- Claud Jacob (1863–1948), British soldier
- Claus Jacob (born 1969), German scientist
- Corentin Jacob (born 1997), French footballer
- Daryl Jacob (born 1983), Irish jockey
- Daniela Jacob (born 1961), German climate scientist
- E. F. Jacob (1894–1971), British scholar
- Edgar Jacob (1844–1920), British religious leader
- Edward Jacob (c. 1710–1788), British scholar and politician
- Ephraim Arnold Jacob (1845–1905), American lawyer and judge
- François Jacob (1920–2013), French biologist
- Franz G. Jacob (1870–?), German chess master
- Georges Jacob (1739–1814), French artist
- Giles Jacob (1686–1744), British jurist and writer
- Gilles Jacob (born 1930), French film critic and essayist
- Gordon Jacob (1895–1984), British musician

=== H–Z ===
- Heinrich Eduard Jacob (1889–1967), German-American writer
- Ian Jacob (1899–1993), British soldier
- Ida Luise Jacob (1826–1904), German cookbook author; see Emmy Braun (pseudonym)
- Irène Jacob (born 1966) French-born Swiss actress
- Jack Farj Rafael Jacob (1921–2016) Lieutenant general, Indian Army
- John Jacob, Marquess of Montferrat (1395–1445), Italian soldier and government administrator
- John Jacob (East India Company officer) (1812–1858)
- John Edward Jacob (born 1934), American activist
- John J. Jacob (Kentucky businessman) (1770–1852), businessman, industrialist and philanthropist
- John J. Jacob (West Virginia politician) (1829–1893), governor
- Ken Jacob, (born 1949) American politician
- Louis Léon Jacob (1768–1854), French admiral
- Marius Jacob (1879–1954), French activist
- Maurice Jacob (1933-2007), French theoretical particle physicist
- Max Jacob (1876–1944), French writer
- Maxime Jacob, or Dom Clément Jacob, (1906–1977), French monk, composer and organist
- Michael Jacob (born 1980), Irish hurler
- Mick Jacob (born 1946), Irish hurler
- Nancy Jacob, American photographer
- Odile Jacob, French publisher
- Pierre Jacob (1953–2018), Canadian politician
- P. L. Jacob, pseudonym of French writer Paul Lacroix (1806–1884)
- Richard Jacob (born 1958), basketball coach
- Robert Jacob (physician) (died 1588), English physician
- Robert Jacob (politician) (1879–1944), Canadian politician in the Manitoba legislature
- Robert J. K. Jacob, American computer scientist and professor at Tufts University
- Sir Robert Jacobe (1573–1618), also spelled Jacob, English-born lawyer in Ireland
- Robin Jacob (born 1941), real name Robert Jacob, English judge
- Romain Jacob (born 1988), French boxer
- Rory Jacob (born 1983), Irish hurler
- Suzanne Jacob (born 1943), Canadian author
- Teuku Jacob (1929–2007), Indonesian paleoanthropologist
- Teun Jacob (1927–2009), Dutch wall painter and sculptor
- Thierry Jacob (1965–2024), French professional boxer
- Trevor Jacob (born 1993), American snowboarder accused of deliberately crashing his own plane
- Ursula Jacob (born 1985), Irish camogie player
- Violet Jacob (1863–1946), Scottish writer
- William & Robert (W & R) Jacob, Irish founders of Jacob's biscuit makers

== Notable people with the surname Jakob ==
- Alfons Maria Jakob (1884–1931), German physician
- Hans Jakob (Esperantist) (1891–1967), German-born Swiss Esperantist
- Hans Jakob (footballer) (1908–1994), German soccer player
- Julia Jakob (born 1991), Swiss orienteer
- Liane Jakob-Rost (born 1928), German scholar
- Ludwig Heinrich von Jakob (1759–1827), German economist
- Maike Jakob (born 2005), German sprint canoeist
- Mark S. Jakob (born 1977), American criminal

== See also ==
- Jacob (name)
- Jacob (disambiguation)
- Jacobs (surname)
- Jakob (disambiguation)
- Jacobite (disambiguation)
- Halimah Yacob (born 1954), eighth president of Singapore
