= Jacob (disambiguation) =

Jacob is an important figure in Abrahamic religions.

Jacob may also refer to:

== People ==
- Jacob (name), a male given name and surname, including a list of variants of the name
  - Jacob (Book of Mormon prophet)
  - Jacob (surname), including a list of people with the surname

== The arts ==
- Jacob, a 2022 album by Ty Herndon
- Jacob (film), a 1994 German/Italian/American TV film
- Jacob (short film), a 2009 Australian short film by Dena Curtis

== Brands and commerce ==
- Jacob (clothing retailer), a Canadian store chain
- Jacob & Co, an American jewelry and wristwatch retailer
- Jacob's, a brand name for several lines of biscuits and crackers

== Places ==
- Jacob, Illinois, U.S.
- Jacob River (Quebec), in Canada

== Other uses ==
- Book of Jacob, in the Book of Mormon
- Jacob (unit), or jow, an obsolete unit of length in India
- Jacob sheep, a British breed of domestic sheep

== See also ==
- Jacobs (disambiguation)
- Jacob's Ladder (disambiguation)
- Jacobean (disambiguation)
- Jacobia (disambiguation)
- Jacobian (disambiguation)
- Jacobin (disambiguation)
- Jacobite (disambiguation)
- Jacobsen (disambiguation)
- Jacobson (disambiguation)
- Jacobus (disambiguation)
- Jakob (disambiguation)
- James (name), a version of Jacob
- Saint Jacob
- Saint James (disambiguation)
