= Surgut Power Station =

Surgut Power Station may refer to:

- Surgut-1 Power Station
- Surgut-2 Power Station
