= GRES-2 =

GRES-2 may refer to:

- Ekibastuz GRES-2
- Surgut-2 Power Station
- Tomsk GRES-2
