= Jacobite =

A Jacobite is a follower of someone named Jacob or James, from the Latin Iācōbus. Jacobite or Jacobitism may refer to:

== Religion ==
- Jacobites, followers of Saint Jacob Baradaeus (died 578). Churches in the Jacobite tradition and sometimes called Jacobite include:
  - Syriac Orthodox Church, sometimes colloquially known as the Jacobite Church
    - Malankara Jacobite Syrian Christian Church, autonomous branch of the Syriac Orthodox Church in Kerala, India
- Jacobite, follower of Henry Jacob (1563–1624), English clergyman
- Jacobites, Biblical name for descendants of Jacob

== Stuart succession ==
Jacobite succession is the line through which the British crown in pretence of the Stuart kingship has descended since 1688

- Followers of Jacobitism, the political movement to resurrect the Stuart line, 1688–1780s
- Jacobite consorts, those who were married to Jacobite pretenders since 1688
- Jacobite Peerage, peers and baronetcies granted by Jacobite claimants since 1688
- Neo-Jacobite Revival, political movement aimed at reviving Jacobite ambitions, 1886–1914
- Royal Stuart Society, organization related to furthering the Jacobite succession to the English throne, 1926–present
- Scottish Jacobite Party, political party which distanced itself from Jacobitism's monarchist origins, 2005–2011
- Jacobite Gold, 1745 shipment of Spanish gold to Scotland, rumoured to still be hidden at Loch Arkaig

== Other ==
- The Jacobite (steam train), a train in Scotland
- The Jacobites were a minor tribe among the Nephites and Lamanites, outlined in the Book of Mormon.

=== Music ===
- "Ye Jacobites by Name", Scottish folk song originating in the Jacobite Risings
- Jacobite Relics, collection of songs related to the Jacobite risings, compiled by James Hogg in 1817
- Jacobites (band), English rock band formed in 1982

== See also ==
- Jacob (disambiguation)
- Jacobin (disambiguation)
- Jacobian (disambiguation)
- Jacobean (disambiguation)
- Jacobus (disambiguation)
