= Surgut =

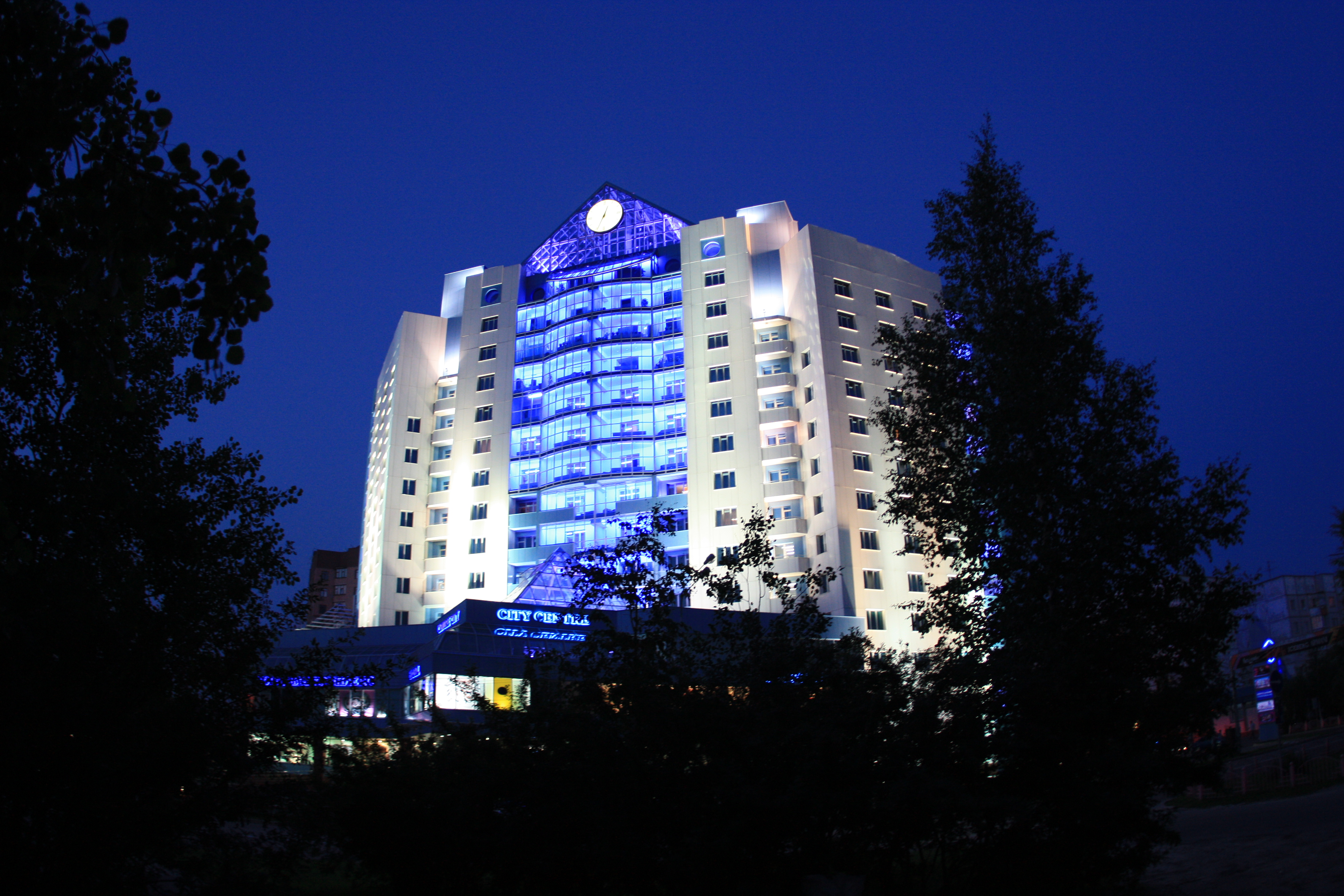
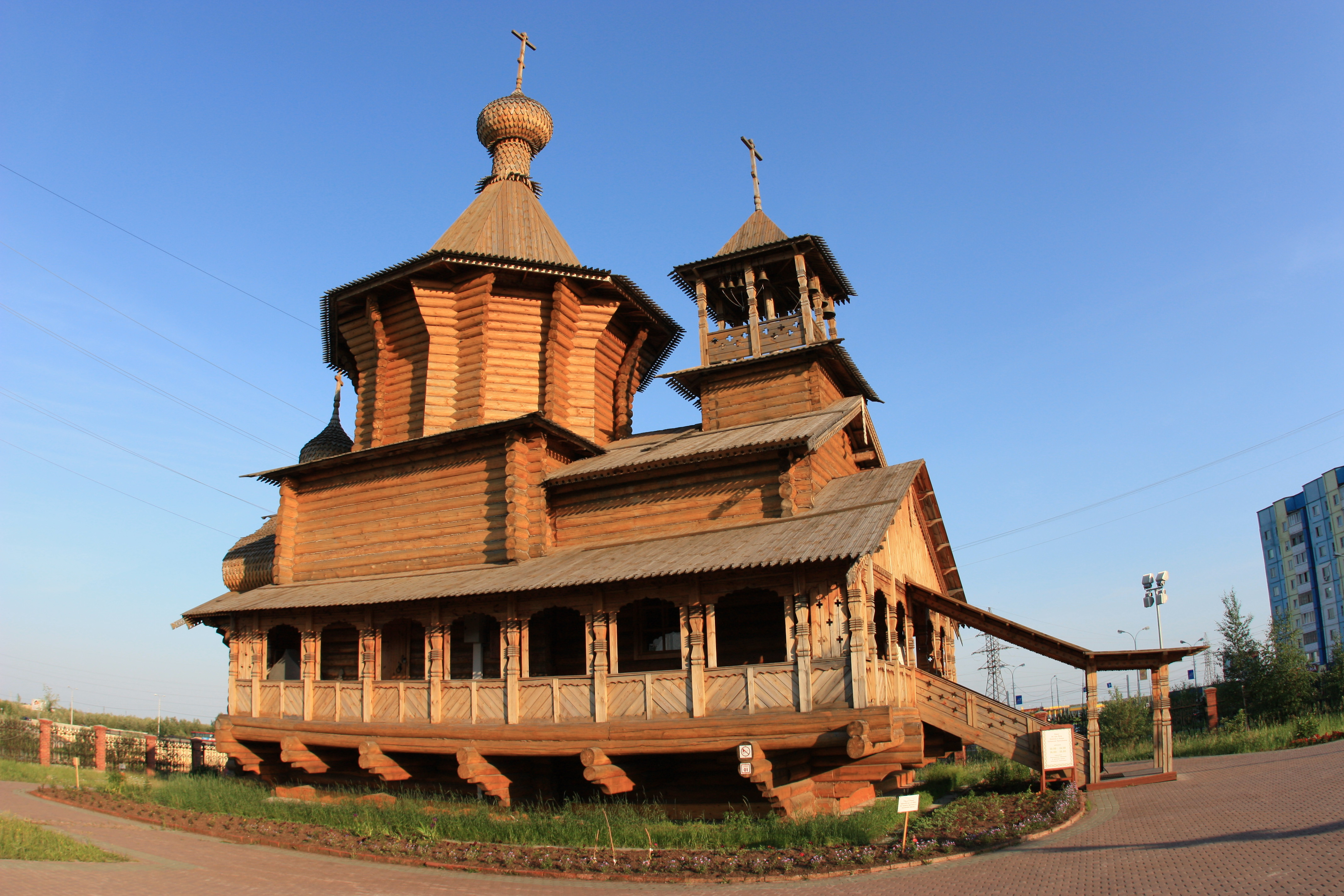
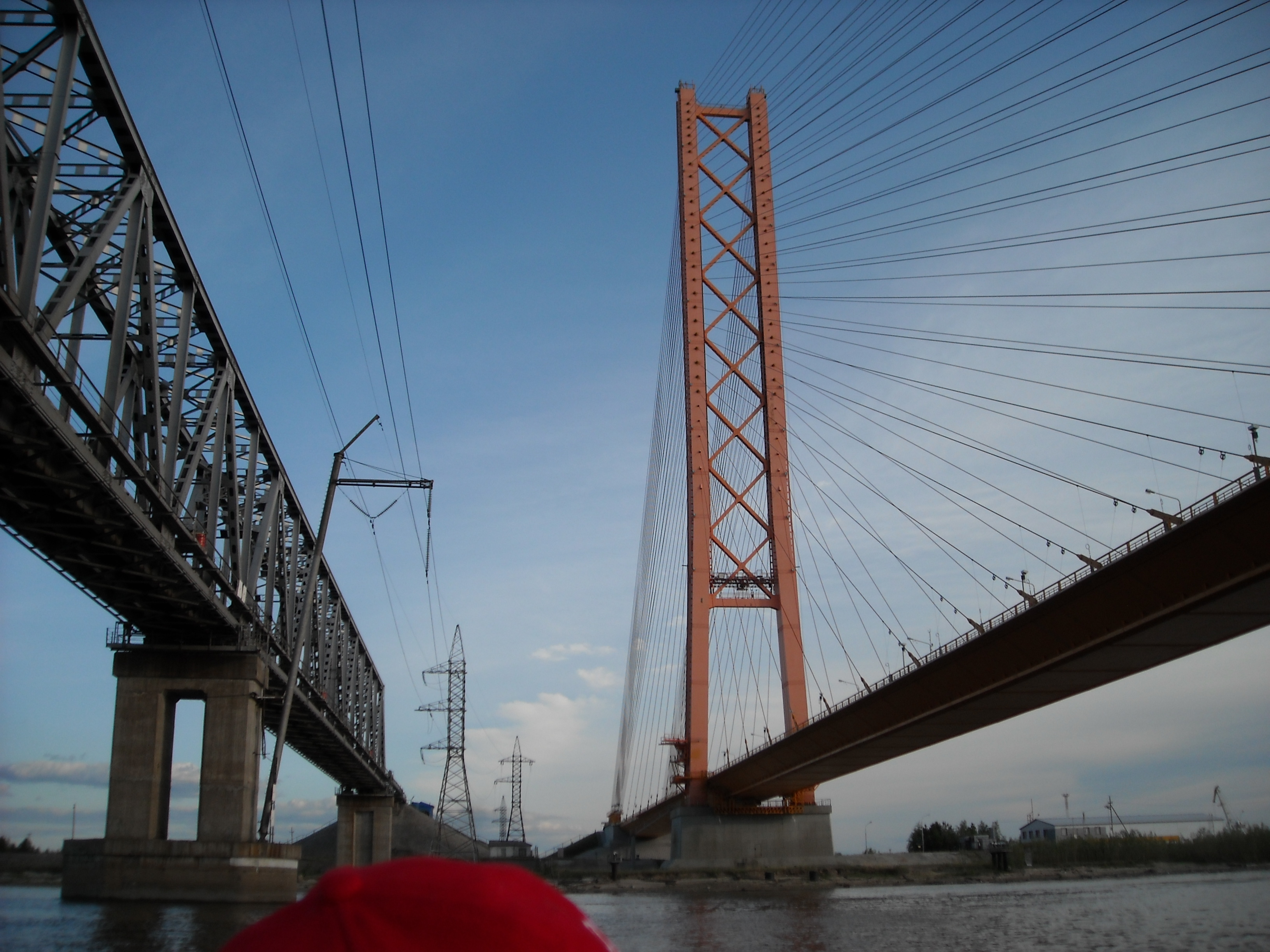
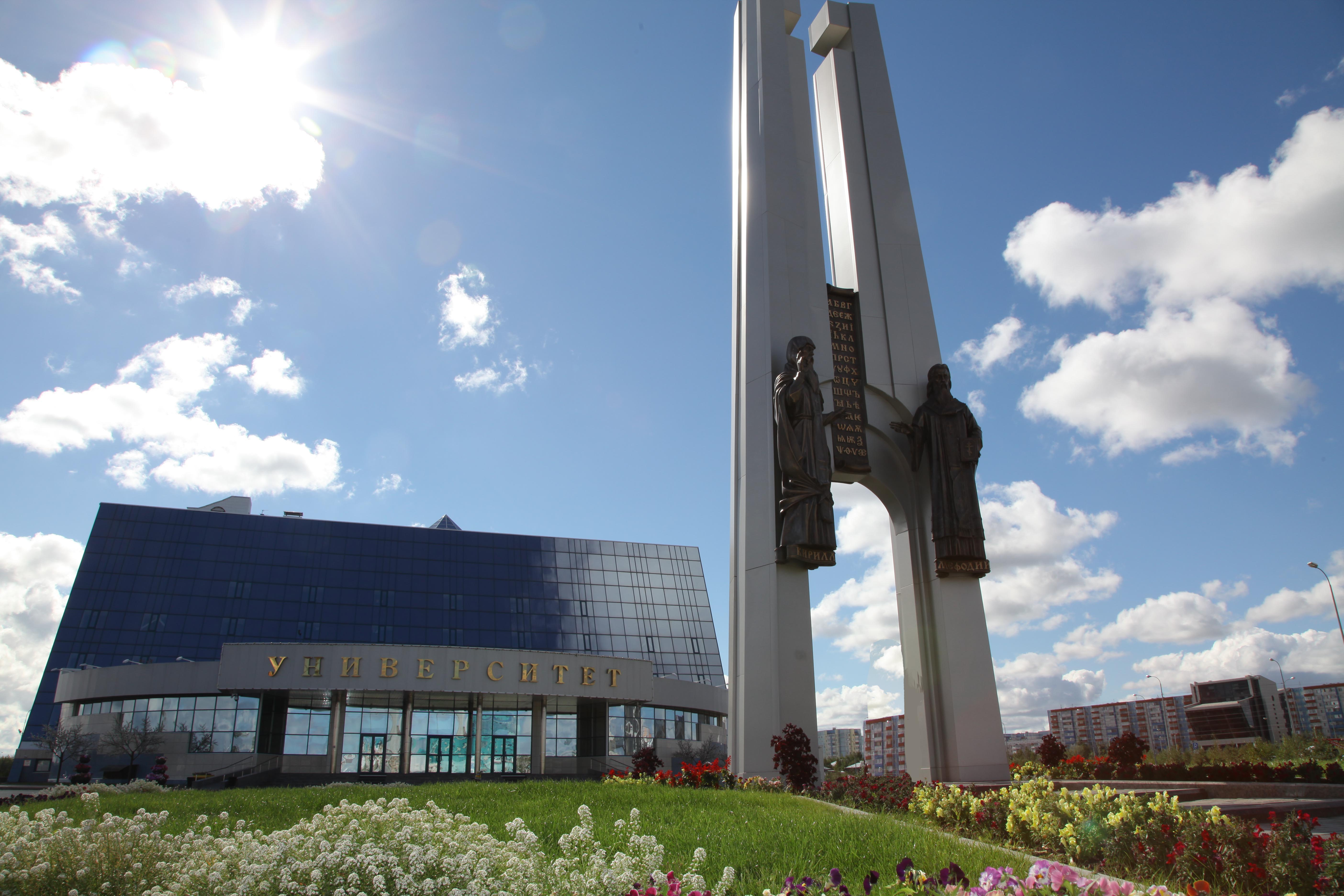
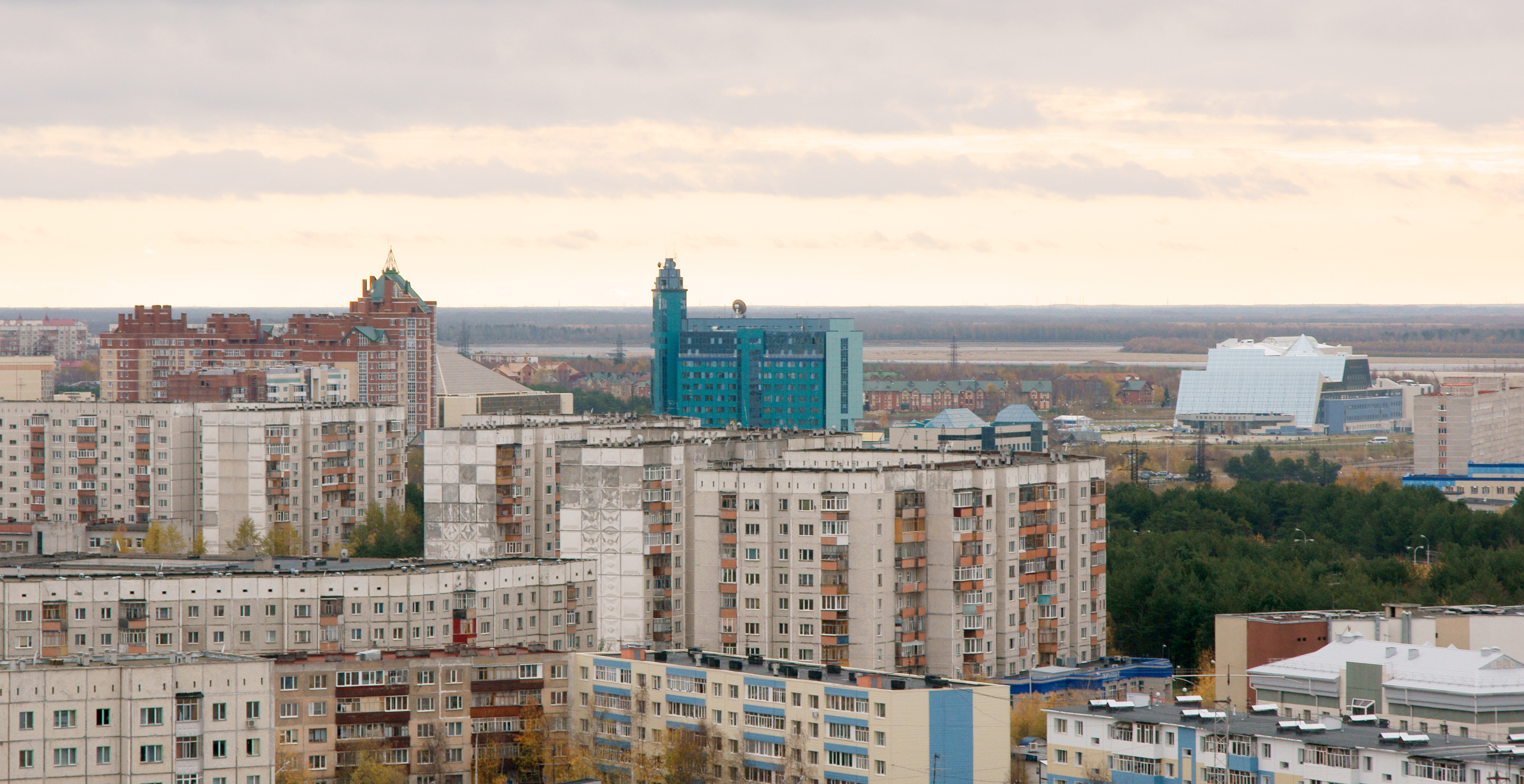
Surgut Сургут Clockwise, from top photo: City centre, Surgut Bridge, skyline in October, Surgut State University, "Old Surgut"
- City
- Flag Coat of arms
- Interactive map of Surgut
- Location of Surgut Surgut (Khanty–Mansi Autonomous Okrug)
- Coordinates: 61°15′N 73°26′E
- Country: Russia
- Federal subject: Khanty-Mansi Autonomous Okrug
- Founded: 1594
- City status since: 1594–1923, June 25, 1965

Government
  - Mayor: Andrey Filatov
- Elevation: 40 m (130 ft)

Population
  - Estimate (2020): 396,443 )

Administrative status
  - Subordinated to: city of okrug significance of Surgut
  - Capital of: Surgutsky District, city of okrug significance of Surgut

Municipal status
  - Urban okrug: Surgut Urban Okrug
  - Capital of: Surgut Urban Okrug, Surgutsky Municipal District
- Time zone: UTC+5 (MSK+2)
- Postal code: 628400
- Dialing code: +7 3462
- OKTMO ID: 71876000001
- Website: www.admsurgut.ru

Surgut (Russian: Сургут, IPA: [sʊrˈgut]; Khanty: Сәрханӆ, Sərhanł; Сө̆ркут, Sörkut) is the largest and most populous city in Khanty-Mansi Autonomous Okrug, Russia, located on the Ob River. It is one of the few cities in Russia to be larger than the capital or the administrative center of its federal subject in terms of population, economic activity, and tourist traffic. The population as per the 2021 Russian censuses was 396,443.

== History ==
It was founded in 1594 by order of Tsar Feodor I. Surgut at the end of the 16th century was a small fortress with two gates and five towers, one of which had a carriageway. In 1596 the Gostiny Dvor was built. In the 17th and 18th centuries it was a center of the Russian development of Siberia. The fortification, built of strong wood, was located on the cape, so that it was impossible to approach it unnoticed either from the river or from the land. In the central square of the ancient settlement there was a cult shrine. Along the perimeter, the fortress was surrounded by a moat, which was blocked by the structures of the defensive system. Outside the village there were special buildings – handicraft workshops, in particular, a smithy. By the name list of 1625 there were 222 servicemen living here. Subsequently, due to high mortality, the population of Surgut gradually decreased. In 1627 it was home to 216 people, which shrank to 200 in 1635, and 199 in 1642. In the second half of the 17th century the population fluctuated around 200 people, and by the end of the century there were 185 inhabitants in Surgut.

Since 1782, the county town of the Surgut district of the Tobolsk province had been formed. In 1785, the city's coat of arms was approved. At the end of the 18th century, in connection with the development of southern Siberian cities, it lost its administrative significance. Since 1868 – district, and since 1898 – the county town of Tobolsk province. The inhabitants of Surgut, like other Siberians, were on state security. Servants annually received money (5 rubles and 25 kopecks), bread (8 quarters for bachelors and 11 quarters for married couples) and salt (a pound and a quarter for bachelors and a pound and a half for married couples). The inhabitants were supplied with weapons and ammunition. At the end of the 19th century (according to the census of 1897), the population of Surgut was 1100 people. The main occupations of the inhabitants were fishing, gathering of wild plants, trade, cattle breeding, and firewood harvesting. In 1835 the Cossack school was founded, and in 1877 – the men's folk school. The women's parochial school also began operation, along with a weather station in 1878, the library-reading room, the people's house, and since 1913, the telegraph. Since November 3, 1923, the city has been the administrative center of the Tobolsk district of the Ural region. Since April 5, 1926, due to the small population of 1300, Surgut was transformed into a district village. In 1928, on the basis of the fish section, the first industrial enterprise was created – the fish canning factory. In 1929 a collective farm was organized, in 1930 – a forest site, and in 1931 – a timber enterprise. In the 1930s in Surgut, attempts were made to extract minerals. October 23, 1934 was the publication date of Surgut's first newspaper – the "Organizer" (today, the "Surgut Tribune").

Rapid urbanization of Surgut took place in the 1960s, when it became a center of oil and gas production. On June 25, 1965, the work settlement of Surgut was granted town status. The city's holiday is celebrated annually on June 12.

The Surgut Bridge is the longest one-tower cable-stayed bridge in the world.

== Administrative and municipal data ==
Within the framework of administrative divisions, it serves as the administrative center of Surgutsky District, even though it is not a part of it. As an administrative division, it is incorporated separately as the city of okrug significance of Surgut—an administrative unit with the status equal to that of the districts. As a municipal division, the city of okrug significance of Surgut is incorporated as Surgut Urban Okrug.

== Economy ==
The city is home to the largest port on the Ob River, the largest road/railway junction in northwest Siberia, and two of the world's most powerful power plants, the SDPP-1 (State District Power Plant 1) and SDPP-2 (State District Power Plant 2), which produce over 7,200 megawatts and supply most of the region with relatively cheap electricity.

Surgut's economy is tied to oil production (the city is known as "The Oil Capital of Russia") and natural gas processing. The most important enterprises are the oil firm Surgutneftegaz and Surgutgazprom (a unit of Gazprom). The Surgut-2 Power Station, providing energy for the city, is the second-largest gas-fired power station in the world.

In Surgut, Tyumen Energy Retail Company, the region's largest energy sales company, is Tyumen's guaranteeing supplier of electric power. It ranks first in terms of the value of the productive supply of electricity among the energy distribution companies of the Urals Federal District, and second among the energy sales companies in Russia.

The management office of OJSC TESS, the largest enterprise of the Urals Federal District, is located in the city. It operates in the sphere of complex service maintenance, overhaul, and reconstruction of electric power facilities.

In addition, Surgut is home to many factories: gas processing, condensate stabilization, and motor fuel production. The dairy, meat processing, timber, and building materials industries (mainly for the production of reinforced concrete structures) are also important.

In 2013, the volume of shipped goods, work performed, and services by large and medium-sized producers of industrial products amounted to 100.7 billion rubles.[47]

The structure of industrial production by types of economic activity in 2013:

"Production and distribution of electricity, gas and water" – 87.8%; "Extraction of minerals" – 6.7%; "Processing industries" – 5.5%. The average monthly salary (for large and medium-sized organizations) in 2013 amounted to 68.7 thousand rubles.

Surgut ranks third out of the 250 largest industrial centers of Russia.

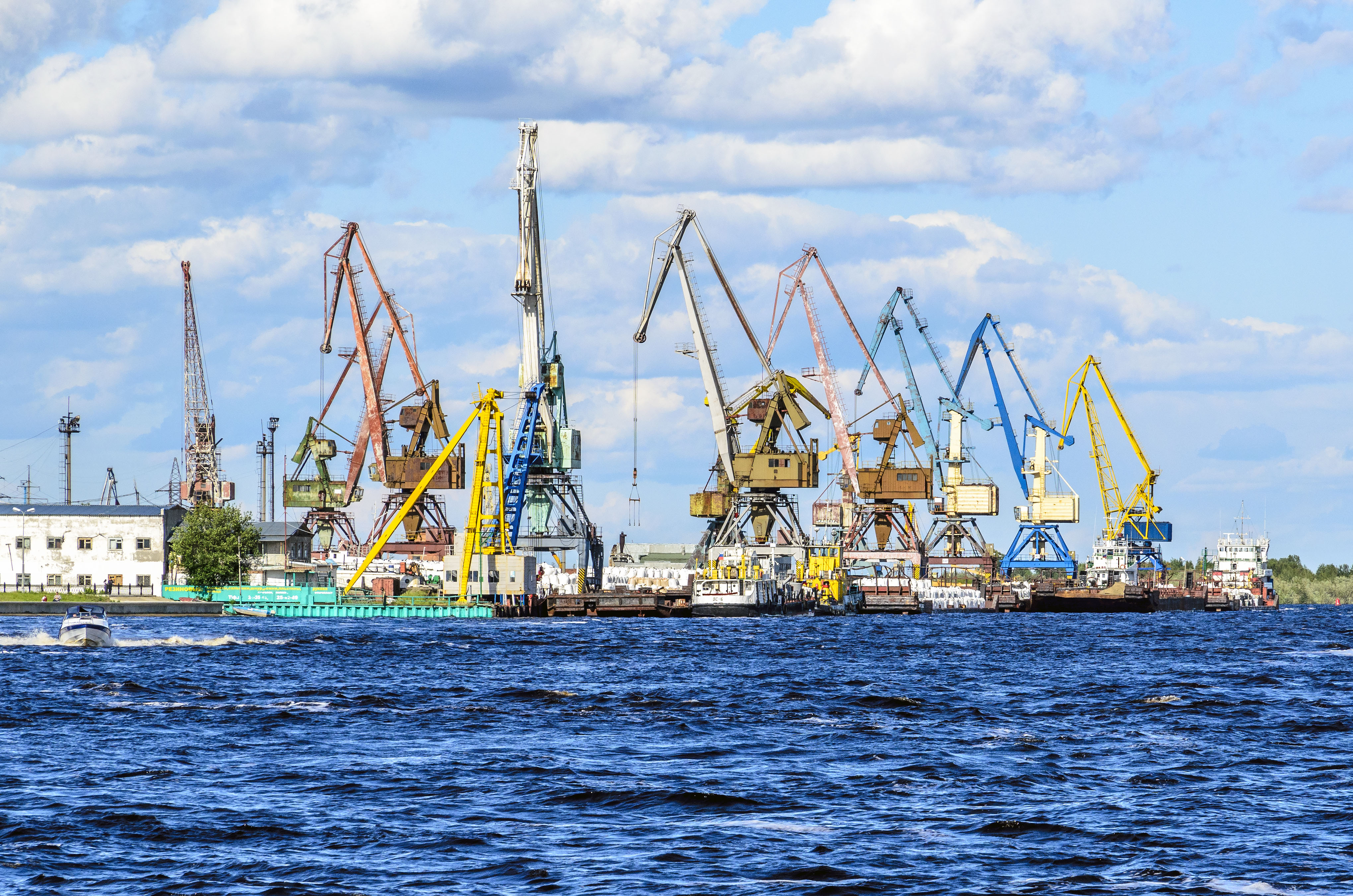
The port

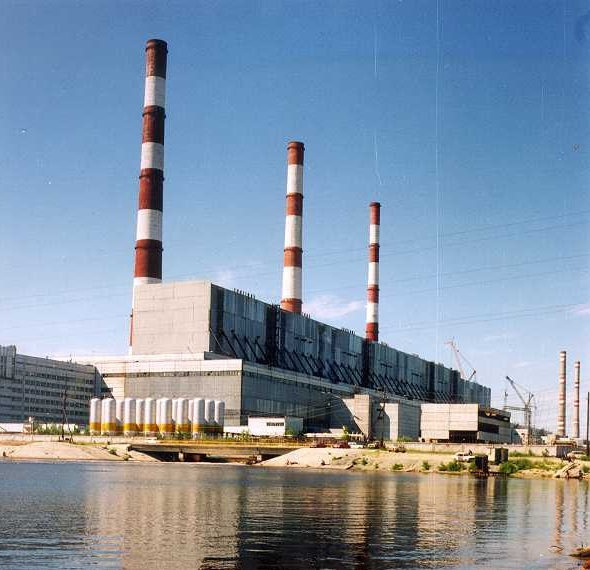
SDPP-2

=== Transportation ===
The city is served by the Farman Salmanov Surgut Airport, which offers flights to Moscow, St. Petersburg, Dubai, Irkutsk, and a number of other cities.

Through Surgut run trains to the east (in Novy Urengoy, Nizhnevartovsk), and to the south-west (in Tyumen, Moscow, Novosibirsk, Ufa, Chelyabinsk, Yekaterinburg).

Road P-404 connects Surgut with Tyumen.

There is a port on the Ob River.

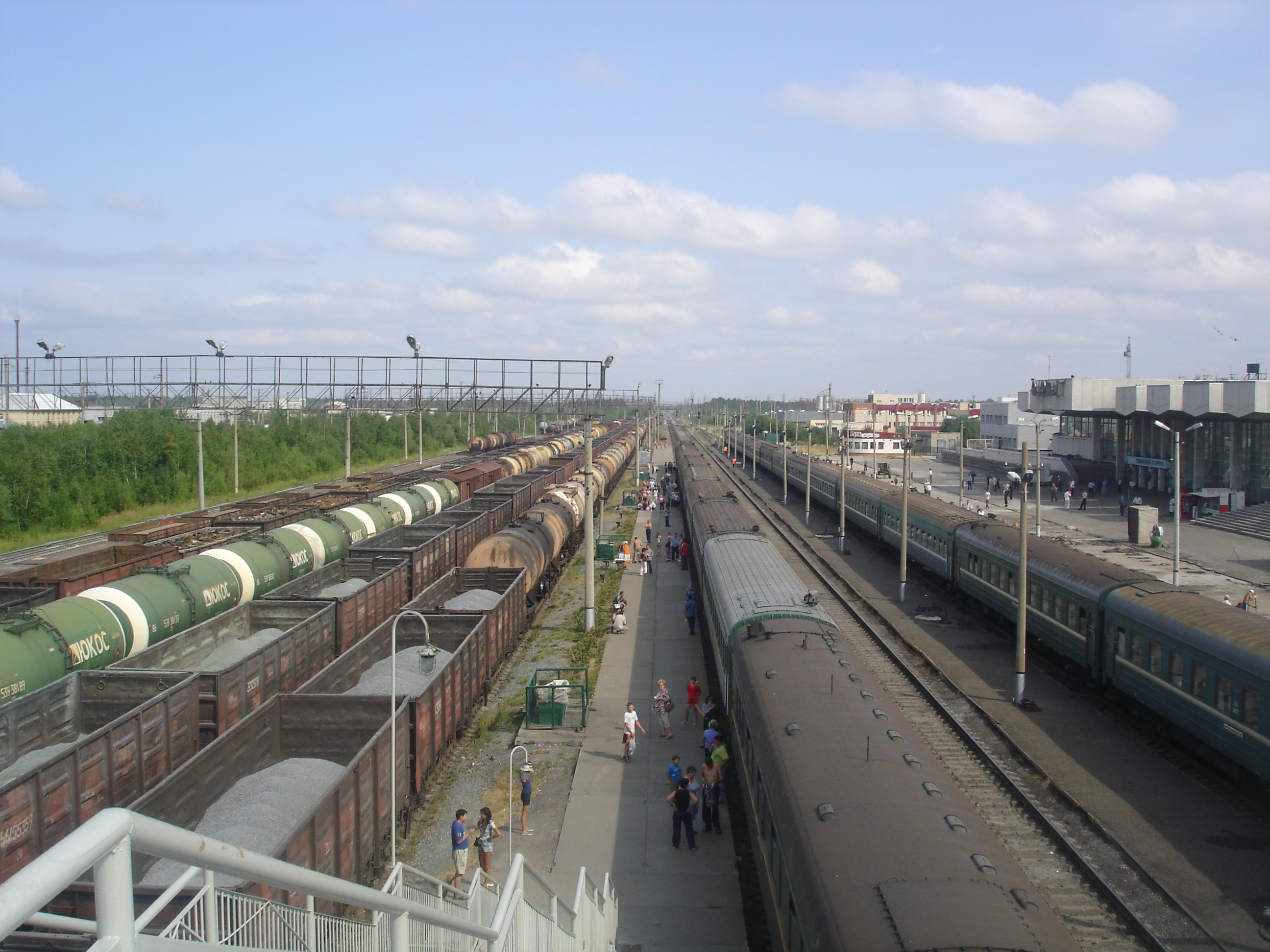
Railway station

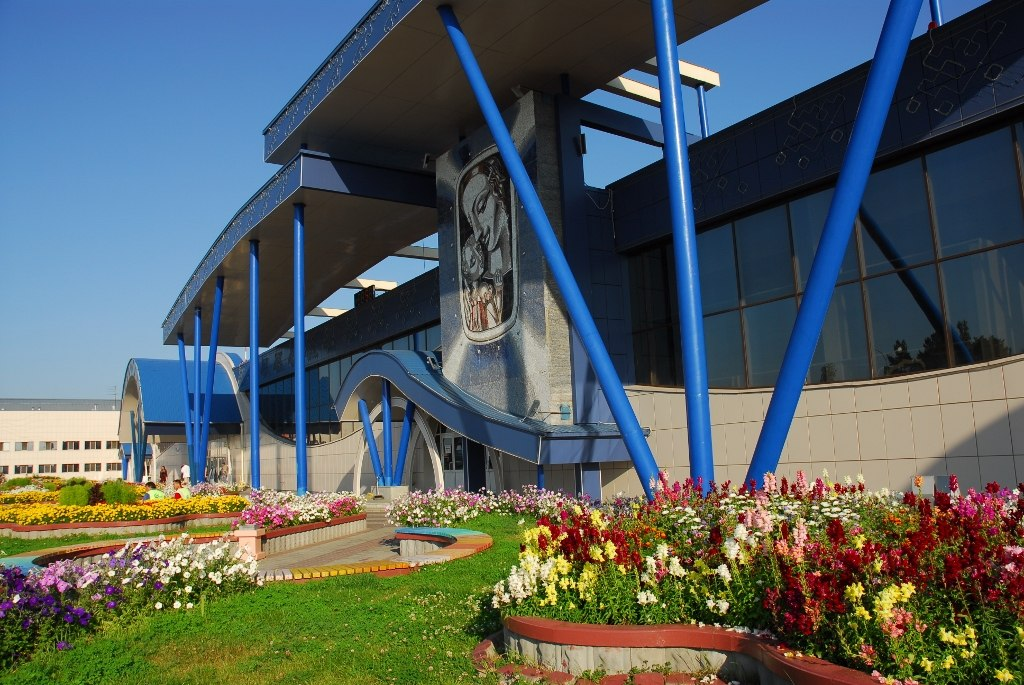
Farman Salmanov Surgut Airport

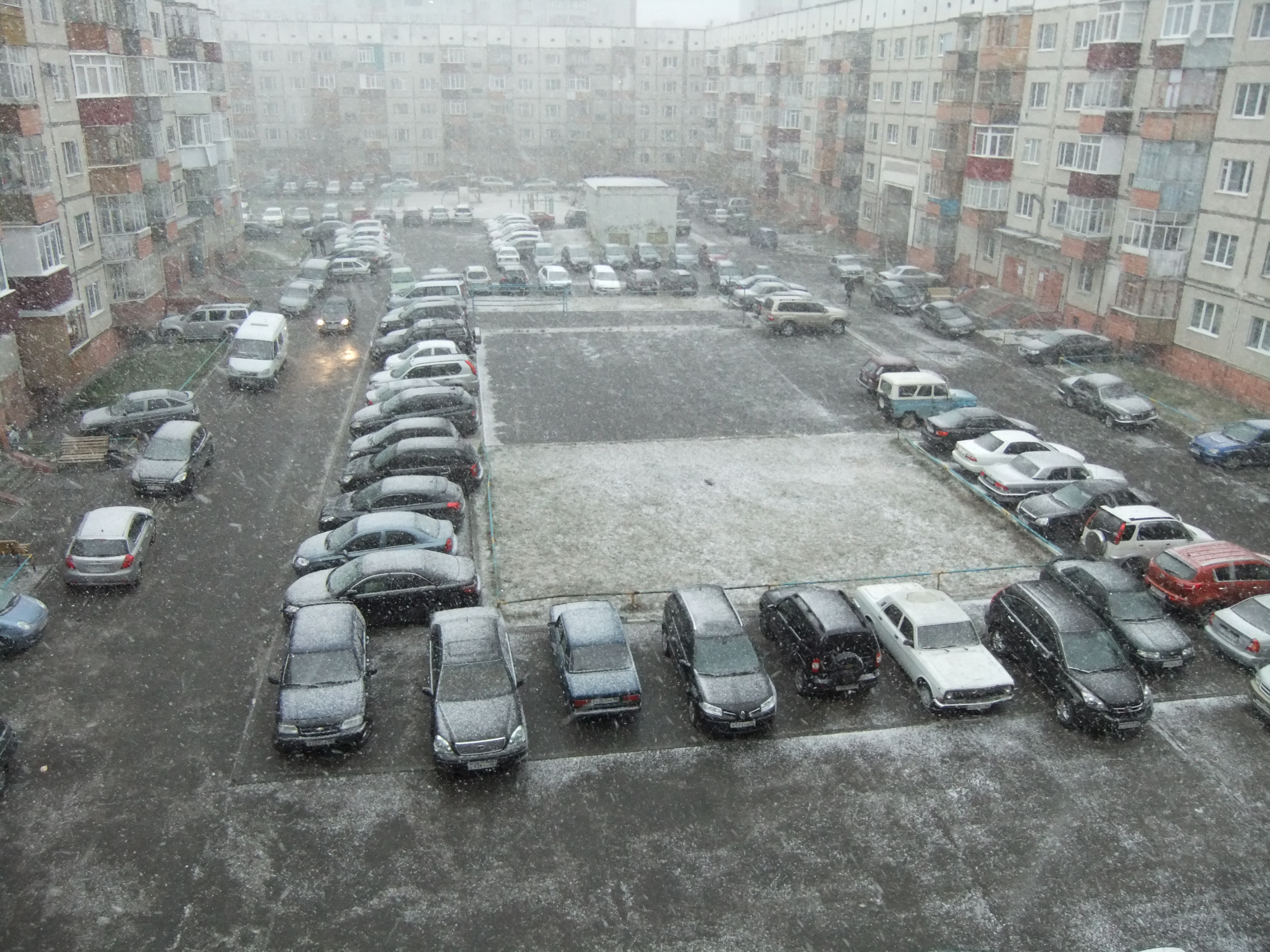
Apartment parking

== Demographics ==
Historical population
| Year | Pop. | ±% |
|---|---|---|
| 1897 | 1,100 | — |
| 1926 | 1,300 | +18.2% |
| 1939 | 2,280 | +75.4% |
| 1959 | 6,031 | +164.5% |
| 1970 | 34,011 | +463.9% |
| 1979 | 107,343 | +215.6% |
| 1989 | 247,823 | +130.9% |
| 2002 | 285,027 | +15.0% |
| 2010 | 306,675 | +7.6% |
| 2021 | 396,443 | +29.3% |
Source: Census data

As of 2021, the ethnic composition of Surgut was:

| Ethnicity | Population | Percentage |
|---|---|---|
| Russians | 183,153 | 72.2% |
| Tatars | 14,363 | 5.7% |
| Ukrainians | 7,920 | 3.1% |
| Bashkirs | 5,842 | 2.3% |
| Tajiks | 4,822 | 1.9% |
| Nogais | 4,288 | 1.7% |
| Azerbaijanis | 3,835 | 1.5% |
| Rutulians | 3,560 | 1.4% |
| Others | 25,986 | 10.2% |

== Education ==
As of July 1, 2016, there are 54 preschools, 5 private kindergartens, 33 schools, 3 gymnasiums and 4 lyceums in Surgut.

The system of additional education includes 4 music schools, a children's choreography school, an art school, 2 art studios, 10 foreign language schools (one of the schools is an English-style Big Ben), 8 children's and youth sports schools, and others.

== Culture ==
=== Music ===
- Tears of Mankind, a death/doom metal band

=== Sights ===
- A commemorative obelisk to the citizens of Surgut, who went to the front in 1941–1945, originally erected at the river station in 1945 in wooden execution. It was restored on May 8, 1995.
- The monument to the first members of the Komsomol of Surgut. On the monument are carved the names of the first 16 Komsomol members of Surgut, and also inscribed are the words of dedication from the youth of the 1960s. The monument plays a big role in patriotic education.
- The monument to Pushkin.
- The monument to Karl Marx.
- Monument to G. Dimitrov
- Monument to the soldiers-internationalists.
- Monument to the builder "Iron Man".
- Monument to a nurse – made at the Sverdlovsk Foundry.
- The monument to the pilots of Siberia – Mi-6 UTair is located not far from the airport.
- The monument of gas fire.
- Sculpture of a fox.
- Monument to Doctor Aybolit.
- Lenin monument.
- Historical and cultural center "Old Surgut".
- Memorial of Glory (Eternal Fire).
- The English language school, which repeats the architecture of Elizabeth Tower that houses the famous bell, Big Ben, is located near the city center.
- The Surgut bridge across the Ob River is the world's largest cable-stayed bridge, in which the central span is supported by one pylon.
- Park "Behind Saima" is a quiet romantic place among the noisy streets.
- Monument to Cyril and Methodius on the area of Sur State University.
- Monument to Taras Shevchenko.
- Monument Smile.
- Monument to condensed milk.
- 20 km (12 mi) to the west of the city, on the north bank of the Ob River, there is an archaeological monument of Barsov Gora.

=== Gallery ===
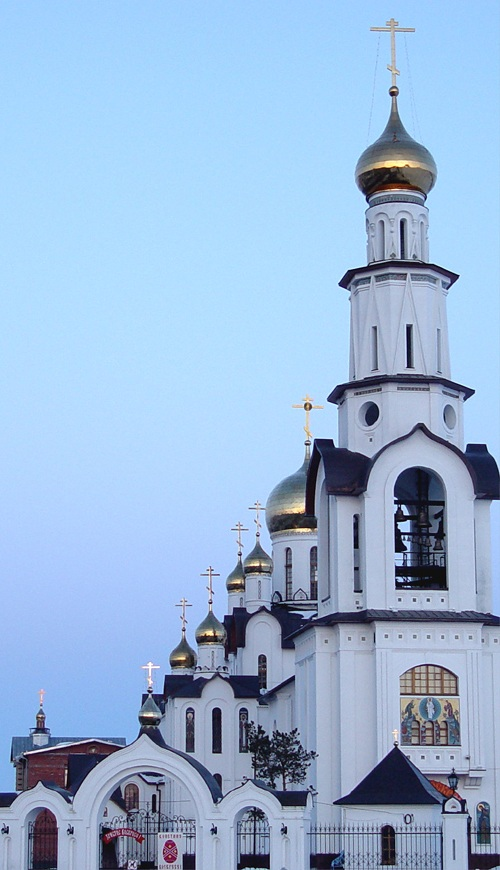
Transfiguration Cathedral in Surgut

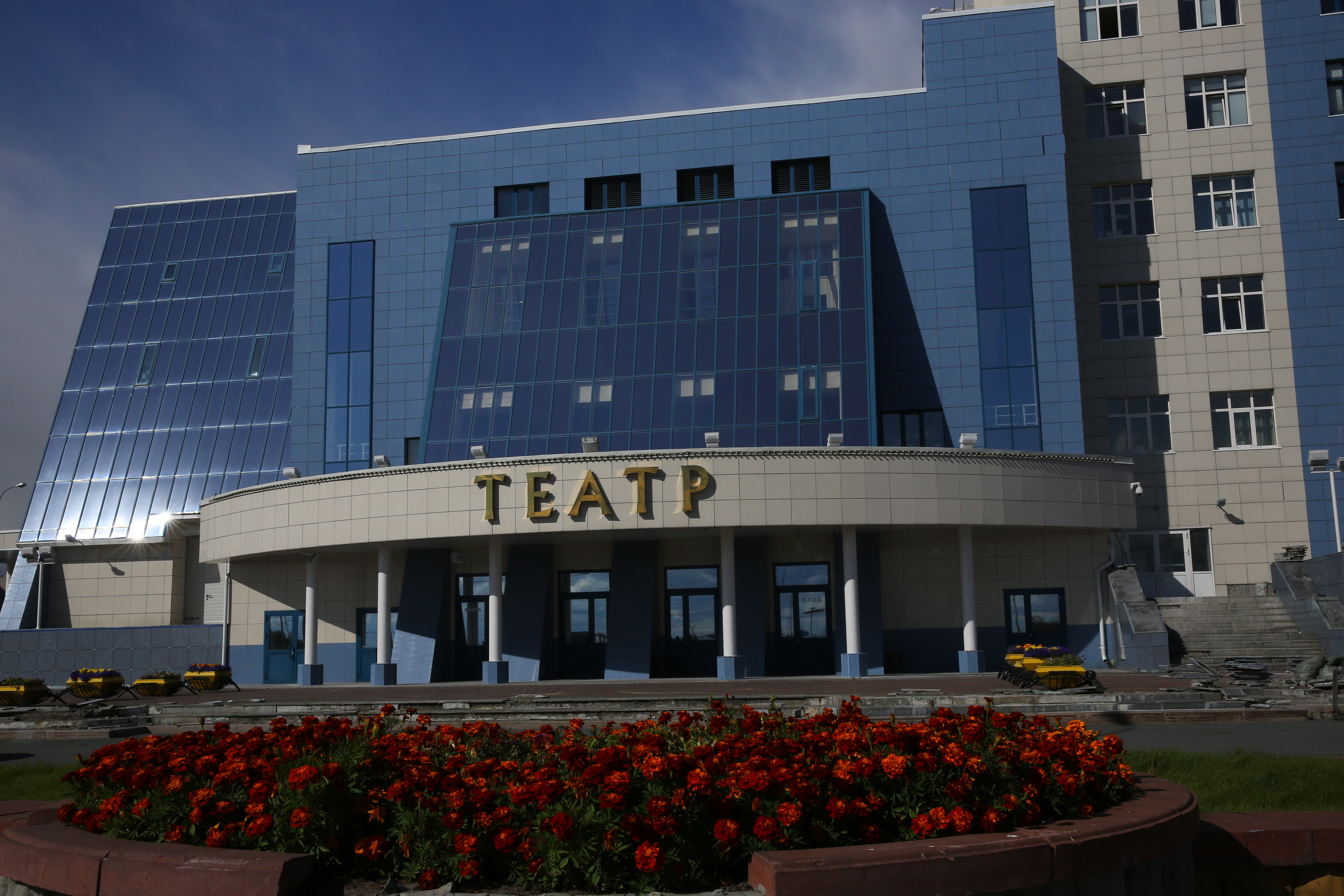
Surgut State University Theater

== Climate ==
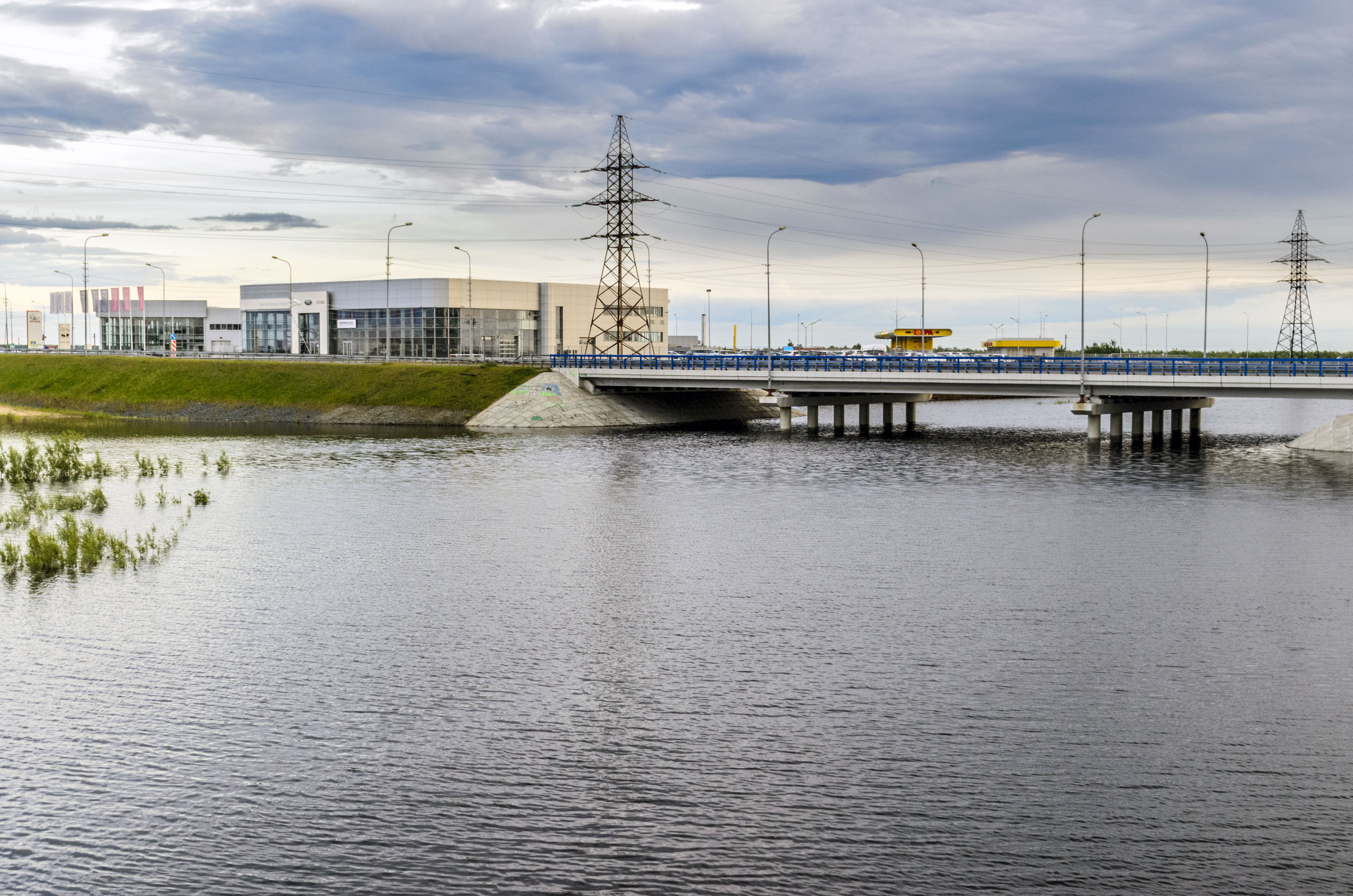
High water on the Saima; June

Surgut has a continental subarctic climate (Köppen climate classification Dfc), with long, frigid winters and short, warm summers. Precipitation is moderate, and is higher from May to October, during which rain is more frequent than in the rest of the year, when snow is more frequent. The annual snow cover gets thicker than further east in Siberia due to lesser influence of the Siberian High, and some moisture from the humid European winters reaching across the Ural Mountains. Surgut is the largest city in the world with a subarctic climate.

Climate data for Surgut
| Month | Jan | Feb | Mar | Apr | May | Jun | Jul | Aug | Sep | Oct | Nov | Dec | Year |
|---|---|---|---|---|---|---|---|---|---|---|---|---|---|
| Record high °C (°F) | 2.7 (36.9) | 6.5 (43.7) | 10.3 (50.5) | 23.0 (73.4) | 31.8 (89.2) | 33.5 (92.3) | 35.2 (95.4) | 30.3 (86.5) | 27.4 (81.3) | 20.7 (69.3) | 8.2 (46.8) | 2.5 (36.5) | 35.2 (95.4) |
| Mean daily maximum °C (°F) | −16.3 (2.7) | −14.2 (6.4) | −4.8 (23.4) | 1.6 (34.9) | 10.6 (51.1) | 18.9 (66.0) | 22.4 (72.3) | 18.2 (64.8) | 10.8 (51.4) | 2.5 (36.5) | −8.3 (17.1) | −14.2 (6.4) | 2.3 (36.1) |
| Daily mean °C (°F) | −20.0 (−4.0) | −18.3 (−0.9) | −9.3 (15.3) | −2.9 (26.8) | 5.8 (42.4) | 14.4 (57.9) | 18.2 (64.8) | 14.4 (57.9) | 7.4 (45.3) | −0.2 (31.6) | −11.5 (11.3) | −18.0 (−0.4) | −1.7 (28.9) |
| Mean daily minimum °C (°F) | −23.4 (−10.1) | −22 (−8) | −13.6 (7.5) | −7.1 (19.2) | 1.7 (35.1) | 10.1 (50.2) | 14.0 (57.2) | 10.8 (51.4) | 4.6 (40.3) | −2.6 (27.3) | −14.6 (5.7) | −21.7 (−7.1) | −5.3 (22.5) |
| Record low °C (°F) | −54.2 (−65.6) | −55.2 (−67.4) | −48.7 (−55.7) | −39.7 (−39.5) | −22 (−8) | −6.7 (19.9) | −0.1 (31.8) | −3.7 (25.3) | −10.5 (13.1) | −30.7 (−23.3) | −46.9 (−52.4) | −55 (−67) | −55.2 (−67.4) |
| Average precipitation mm (inches) | 25 (1.0) | 22 (0.9) | 28 (1.1) | 34 (1.3) | 58 (2.3) | 57 (2.2) | 76 (3.0) | 69 (2.7) | 85 (3.3) | 55 (2.2) | 39 (1.5) | 32 (1.3) | 580 (22.8) |
| Average rainy days | 0.3 | 0.1 | 1 | 6 | 12 | 14 | 12 | 15 | 15 | 12 | 3 | 1 | 91.4 |
| Average snowy days | 22 | 18 | 15 | 9 | 4 | 1 | 0 | 0 | 1 | 11 | 20 | 23 | 124 |
| Average relative humidity (%) | 81 | 79 | 75 | 69 | 65 | 65 | 67 | 76 | 79 | 84 | 84 | 82 | 76 |
| Mean monthly sunshine hours | 31 | 95 | 147 | 218 | 252 | 261 | 311 | 217 | 136 | 70 | 46 | 23 | 1,807 |
Source 1: Pogoda.ru.net
Source 2: NOAA (sun only, 1961–1990)

== Sports ==
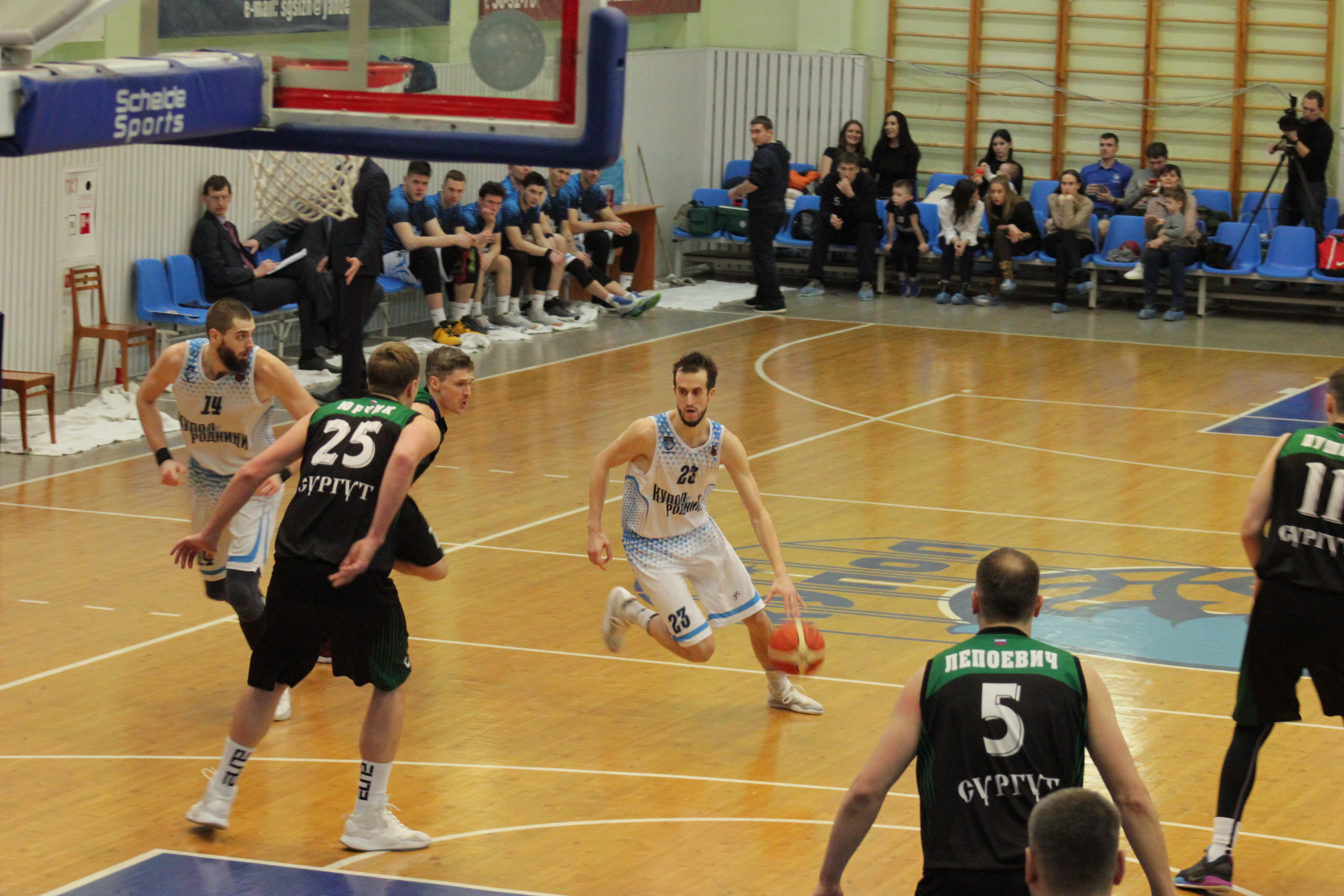
Universitet Surgut is in green and black

Sport and recreation complexes "Friendship", "Fakel", and "Neftyanik" are known far beyond the city limits, as they hold high-level sports competitions. In 2006, they added the multi-functional sports complex "Sparta", beginning construction of its stadium.

In 2009, the city of Surgut ranked 2nd in terms of the socioeconomic development of the municipalities of the Khanty-Mansiysk Autonomous Okrug – Ugra in the field of "Physical Culture and Sport", and ranked 3rd in terms of the effectiveness of the use of sports facilities among the municipalities of the district.

Sport Club:

- Universitet Surgut, a basketball team playing in the Russian Basketball Super League
- Gazprom-Yugra, a men's volleyball club competing in the Russian Volleyball Super League and playing its home matches at the Premier Arena

== Coat of arms ==
The modern coat of arms of Surgut, featuring "in the golden field – a black fox with a silver tail end, walking along the azure land", was approved on November 20, 2003, by decision of the city duma on November 4, 2003.

== Twin towns – sister cities ==
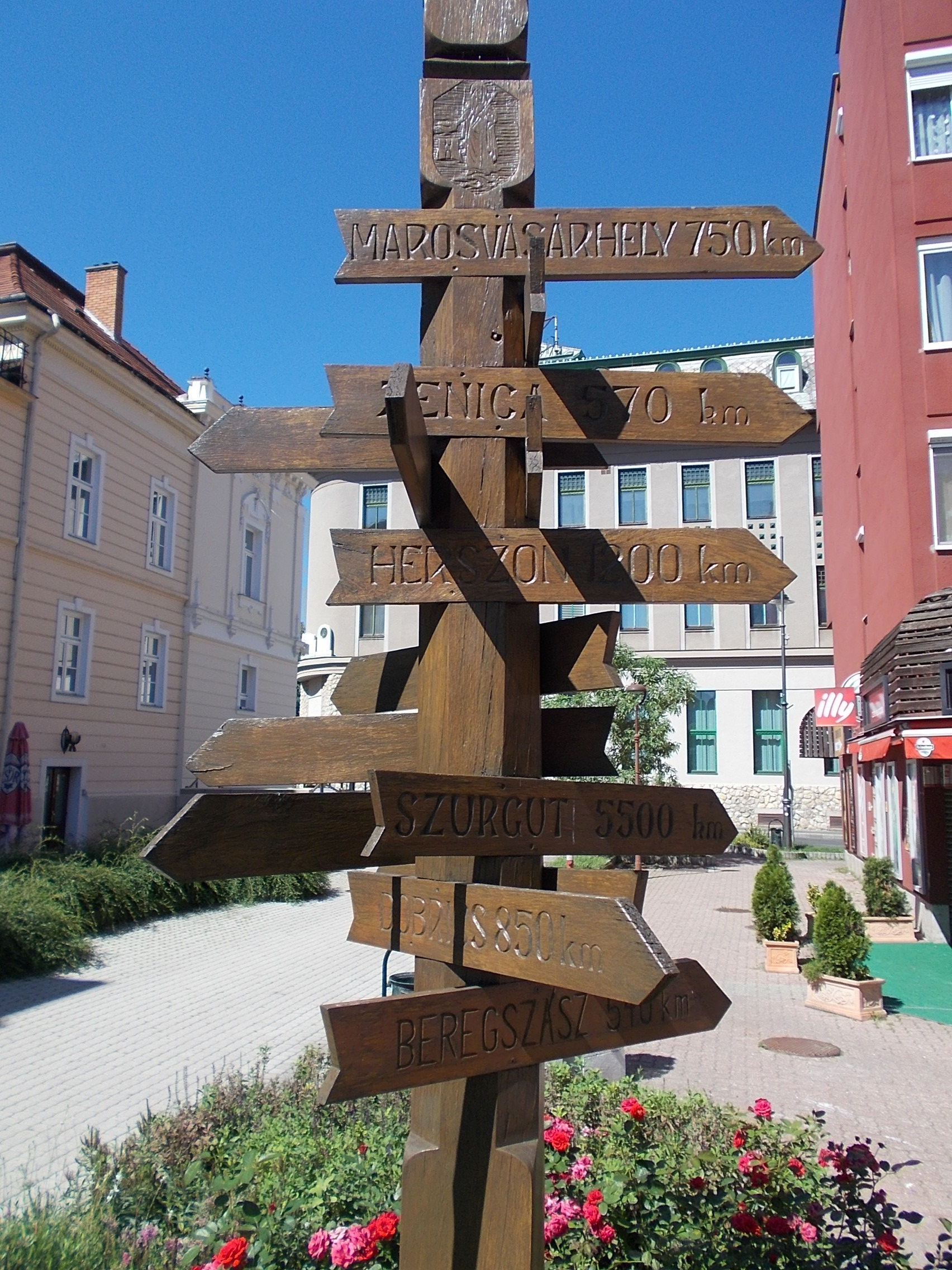
Sign in Zalaegerszeg that points to Surgut

Surgut is twinned with:

- Chaoyang, China
- Katerini, Greece
- Zalaegerszeg, Hungary

== Notable people ==
- Igor Bobkov (born 1991), ice hockey goaltender
- Miroslava Duma (born 1985)
- Isolda Dychauk (born 1993), actress
- Anastasiia Gontar (born 2001), paralympic swimmer
- Pavel Ivashko (born 1994), sprinter
- Ksenia Klimenko (born 2003), artistic gymnast
- Andrei Kolegayev (1887–1937), Left Socialist-Revolutionary, Soviet politician
- Aleksandr Kolomeytsev (born 1989), football player
- Viktor Maslov (born 1976), racing driver
- Yelena Terleyeva (born 1985), pop singer

== Gallery ==
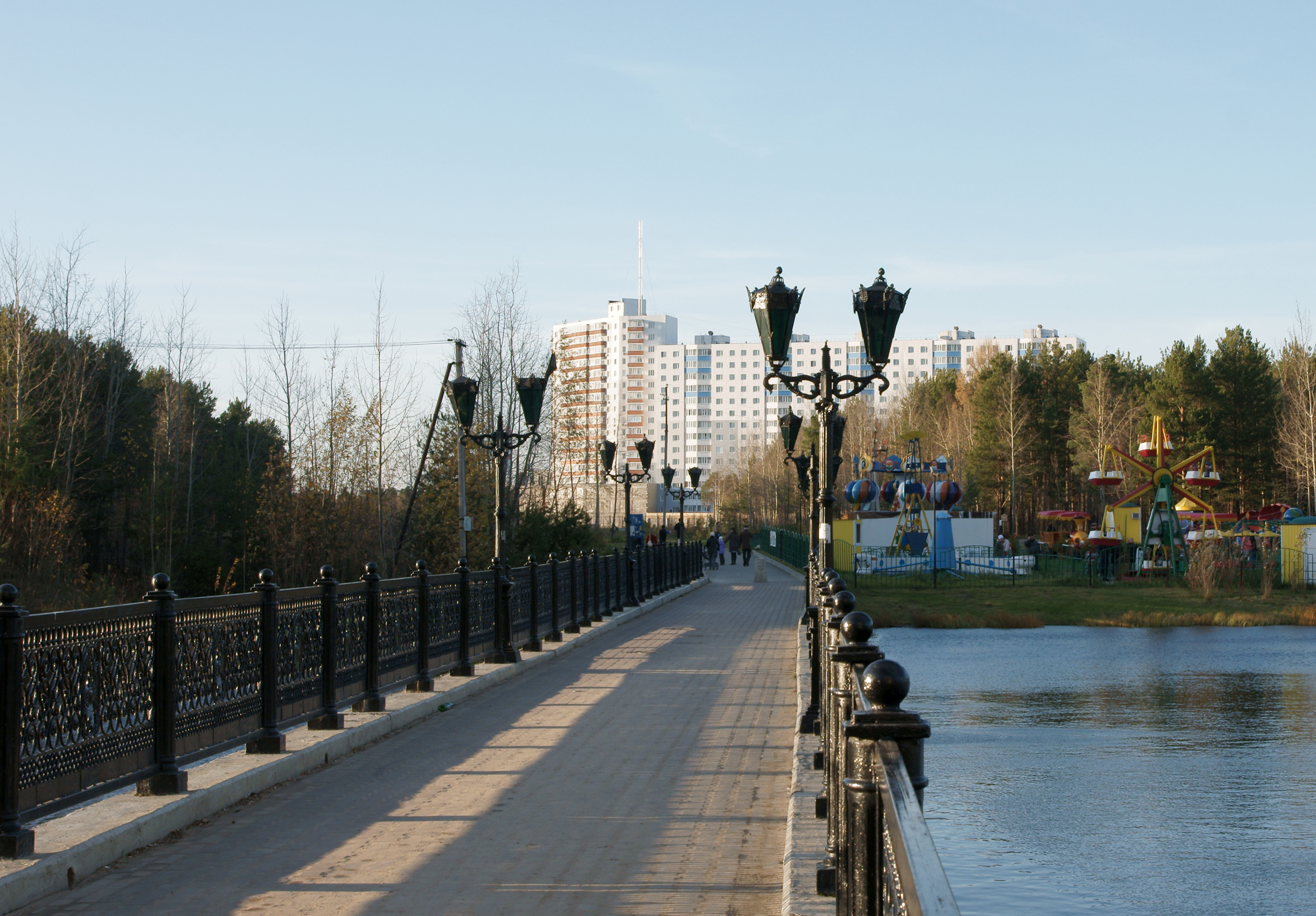
Park near the Saima river

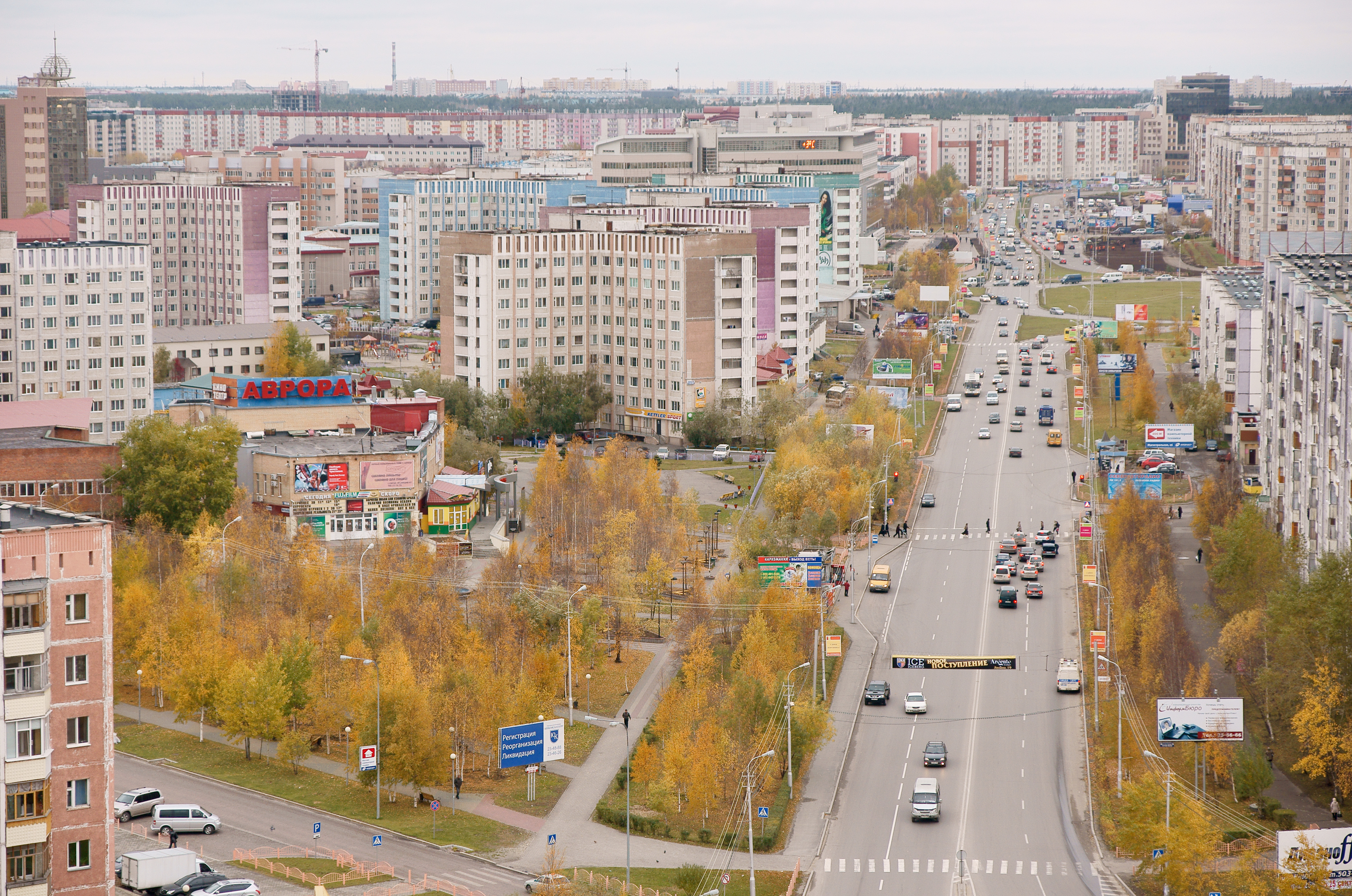
Surgut at the end of September

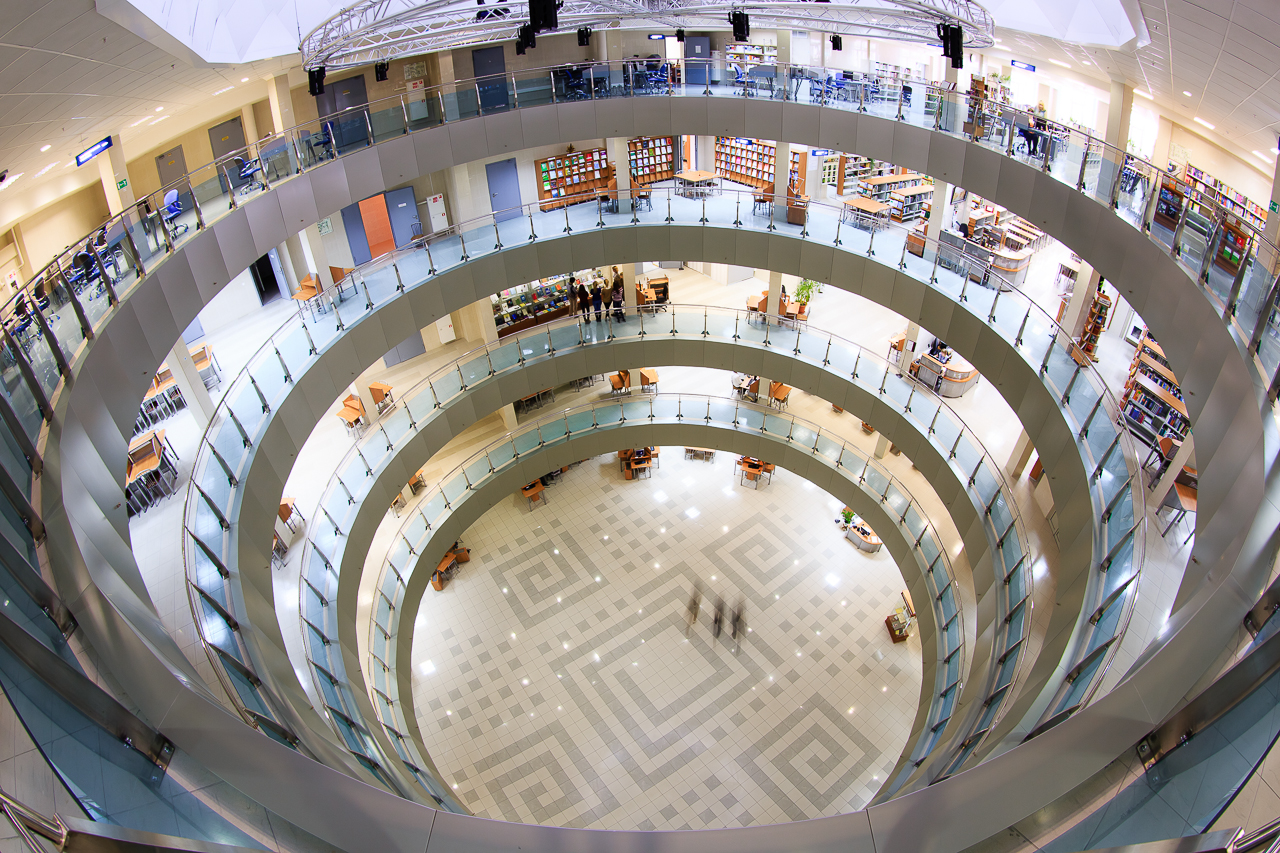
Inside of the library at Surgut State University

== See also ==
- List of power stations in Russia
