= Novosibirsk Institute of Program Systems =

Russian scientific organization

- Established: 1972
- Address: Lavrentyev Prospekt, 6/1, Novosibirsk, 630090, Russia
- Location: Novosibirsk, Russia
- Website: nips.ru

Novosibirsk Institute of Program Systems (Russian: Новосибирский институт программных систем) is a scientific organization in Sovetsky District of Novosibirsk, Russia. It was founded in 1972.

== History ==
In 1972, a branch of the Lebedev Institute of Precision Mechanics and Computer Engineering was established in Novosibirsk. In 1992, the branch became an independent organization. In 2002, 240 people worked at the institute.

== Activity ==
The organization is engaged in the development of automated control systems. It created automated control systems for the Diamonds of Russia – Sakha, Surgut-1 Power Station etc.
