= Robert Jacob =

Robert Jacob may refer to:

- Robert Jacob (politician) (1879–1944), Canadian politician in the Manitoba legislature
- Robert Jacob (physician) (died 1588), English physician
- Sir Robert Jacobe (1573–1618), or Jacob, English-born lawyer in Ireland
- Robert Jacob Shipyard, shipbuilder located at City Island, New York; later a part of Consolidated Shipbuilding
- Robin Jacob (born 1941), real name Robert Jacob, English judge
- Robert "Bob" Jacob, founder of defunct company Cinemaware
- Robert J. K. Jacob, American computer scientist and professor at Tufts University
