= Yugra Bridge =

Yugra Bridge Югорский мост
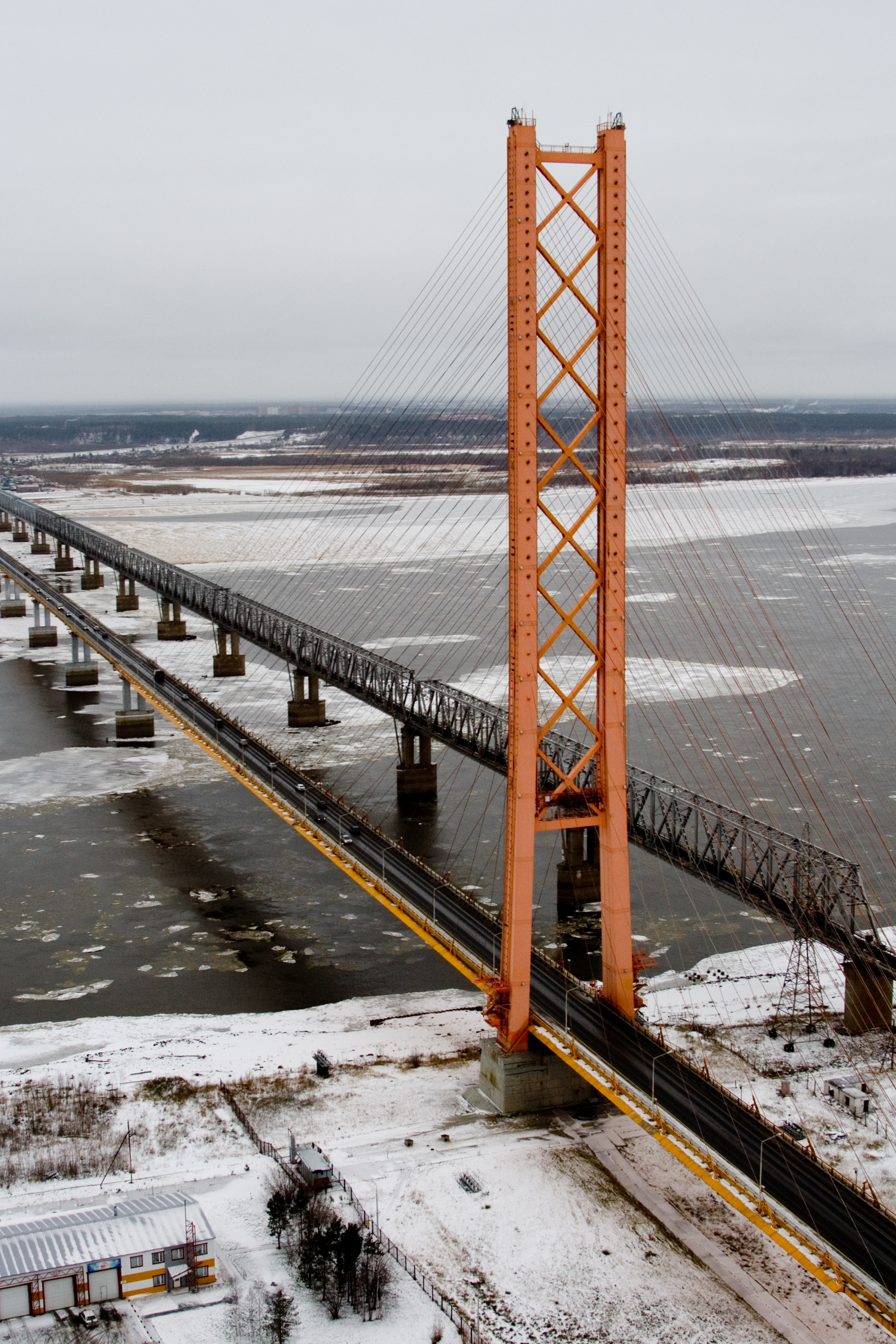
- The Yugra Bridge on the left of image.
- Coordinates: 61°13′34″N 73°09′35″E
- Crosses: Ob River
- Locale: Surgut, Russia

Characteristics
- Design: Cable-stayed
- Total length: 2,070 metres (6,790 ft)
- Width: 146 metres (479 ft)
- Height: 146 metres (479 ft)
- Longest span: 408 metres (1,339 ft)

History
- Construction start: October 1995
- Opened: September 2000

Location
- Interactive map of Yugra Bridge

The Yugra Bridge (Russian: Югорский мост; or Surgut Bridge, Russian: Сургутский мост) is a cable-stayed bridge across the Ob River at Surgut, Russia. It is one of the longest in Siberia. The bridge is 2,070 meters (6,790 ft) long and has only one tower. Its central span of 408 meters (1,339 ft) makes it the longest single-tower cable-stayed bridge in the world. The bridge was inaugurated in September 2000 and the bridge carries road traffic. A steel truss rail bridge runs parallel to the Yugra Bridge.

== See also ==
- List of largest cable-stayed bridges
