= Jacobin (disambiguation) =

The Jacobins were a political club during the French Revolution.

Jacobin may also refer to:

- Jacobin (politics), a member of the Jacobin club, or political radical, generally
- Jacobin (hummingbird), two species of hummingbirds from the genus Florisuga
- Jacobin (magazine), an American leftist political magazine
- Jacobin (pigeon), a breed of domestic pigeon
- Jacobin violet, another name for the French wine grape Pascal blanc
- The Jacobin, an opera by Antonín Dvořák
- The Black Jacobins, a book about the Haitian revolution by C.L.R. James
- Dominican Order, the Catholic religious order known in France as the Jacobin Order
- Jacobinismo, early name for liberal developments in Portugal that led to revolution, possibly derogatory.
- Deutsche Jakobiner, name for different German clubs modeled after the Jacobin Club, some derived from regional branches of original Society of the Friends of the Constitution.

== See also ==
- Jacobina
- Jacobini
- Jacobean (disambiguation)
- Jacobite (disambiguation)
- Jacobitism, support for the House of Stuart
