= Jacobean =

Jacobean may refer to:

- An adjectival form of the name James
- Jacobean era, the period of English and Scottish history that coincides with the reigns of King James VI and I
  - Jacobean architecture
  - Jacobean English (the language used in the King James Version of the Bible)
  - Jacobean embroidery
  - Jacobean furniture, see Elizabethan and Jacobean furniture
  - Jacobean literature
  - Jacobean theatre

== See also ==
- Jacobian (disambiguation)
- Jacobin (disambiguation)
- Jacobite (disambiguation)
- Jacobitism
