= Jakob =

Jakob may refer to:

== People ==
- Jakob (given name), including a list of people with the name
- Jakob (surname), including a list of people with the name

== Other ==
- Jakob (artist) a Norwegian musician formerly known as Jakob Ogawa
- Jakob (band), a New Zealand band, and the title of their 1999 EP
- Max Jakob Memorial Award, annual award to scholars in the field of heat transfer
- Ohel Jakob synagogue (Munich)

== Fictional characters ==
- Jakob, a character from the video game Fire Emblem Fates

== See also ==
- Jacob (disambiguation)
- Saint Jacob
