= Romain Jacob =

French boxer

Personal information
- Nationality: (France) French
- Born: 18 August 1988 (age 37)
- Height: 5 ft 6.5 in (1.69 m)
- Weight: Super Featherweight; Lightweight

Boxing career
- Stance: Orthodox

Boxing record
- Total fights: 24
- Wins: 23
- Win by KO: 7
- Losses: 1
- Draws: 0

Romain Jacob (born 18 August 1988 in France) is a French professional boxer. He is a former EBU Super Featherweight champion.

== Professional career ==
On 28 June 2013 Jacob defeated Martín Cardona by fifth-round technical knockout to win the IBF Youth Super Featherweight title.

On 14 February 2014 Jacob defeated Devis Boschiero by split decision to win the EBU Super Featherweight title.

== Professional boxing record ==
24 fights; 23 wins (7 knockouts), 1 loss
Res.	Record	Opponent	Type	Round	Date	Location	Notes
Loss	23–1	Juli Giner	TKO	8 (12)	2015-11-10	Salle Damremon, Boulogne-sur-Mer, Pas-de-Calais, France	Lost EBU super-featherweight title.
Win	23–0	Ermano Fegatilli	UD	12	2015-04-24	Salle Calypso, Calais, Pas-de-Calais, France	Retained EBU super-featherweight title.
Win	22–0	Devis Boschiero	UD	12	2014-10-10	Salle Calypso, Calais, Pas-de-Calais, France	Retained EBU super-featherweight title.
Win	21–0	Devis Boschiero	SD	12	2014-02-14	Salle Calypso, Calais, Pas-de-Calais, France	Won EBU super-featherweight title.
Win	20–0	Edilson Rio	PTS	8	2013-10-25	Salle Edgard Quinet, Calais, Pas-de-Calais, France	
Win	19–0	Martín Cardona	TKO	5 (10)	2013-06-28	Salle Calypso, Calais, Pas-de-Calais, France	Won vacant IBF Youth super-featherweight title.
Win	18–0	Leonus Marie Francoise	UD	10	2013-04-11	Salle Leon Blum, Boulogne-sur-Mer, Pas-de-Calais, France	Retained French super-featherweight title.
Win	17–0	Karim Chakim	UD	10	2012-11-16	Salle Calypso, Calais, Pas-de-Calais, France	Retained French super-featherweight title.
Win	16–0	Ravil Mukhamadiyarov	PTS	6	2012-06-02	Salle Edgard Quinet, Calais, Pas-de-Calais, France	
Win	15–0	Samir Kasmi	UD	10	2012-04-06	Salle Edgard Quinet, Calais, Pas-de-Calais, France	Retained French super-featherweight title.
Win	14–0	Sylvain Chapelle	UD	10	2011-11-18	Salle Andre Segard, Bleriot-Plage, Pas-de-Calais, France	Retained French super-featherweight title.
Win	13–0	Sebastien Cornu	PTS	10	2011-06-10	Salle Edgard Quinet, Calais, Pas-de-Calais, France	Won vacant French super-featherweight title.
Win	12–0	Richard Szebeledi	TKO	3 (6)	2011-02-12	Salle des Huttes, Gravelines, Nord, France	
Win	11–0	Maurycy Gojko	PTS	8	2010-12-10	Salle Edgard Quinet, Calais, Pas-de-Calais, France	
Win	10–0	Youness Laribi	UD	6	2010-11-12	Salle Edgard Quinet, Calais, Pas-de-Calais, France	
Win	9–0	Michael Isaac Carrero	PTS	8	2010-02-12	Salle Andre Segard, Bleriot-Plage, Pas-de-Calais, France	
Win	8–0	Mohamed Benbiou	TKO	4 (8)	2009-12-11	Salle Edgard Quinet, Calais, Pas-de-Calais, France	
Win	7–0	Lubos Priehradnik	PTS	6	2009-10-04	Salle Edgard Quinet, Calais, Pas-de-Calais, France	
Win	6–0	Fernando Guevara	TKO	3 (6)	2008-02-23	Salle Edgard Quinet, Calais, Pas-de-Calais, France	
Win	5–0	Wladimir Borov	TKO	3 (6)	2009-03-13	Le Zenith Galaxy, Amnéville, Moselle, France	
Win	4–0	Stefan Berza	TKO	3 (6)	2007-10-27	Salle Tetelin, Arras, Pas-de-Calais, France	
Win	3–0	Sandor Fekete	PTS	6	2009-01-17	Salle Edgard Quinet, Calais, Pas-de-Calais, France	
Win	2–0	Anton Glofak	KO	2 (6)	2008-12-06	Salle CS Rostant, Bruay-la-Buissière, Pas-de-Calais, France	
Win	1–0	Ladislav Nemeth	PTS	6	2008-10-31	Salle Edgard Quinet, Calais, Pas-de-Calais, France	
