= Feodor I of Russia =

Tsar of Russia from 1584 to 1598

Feodor I
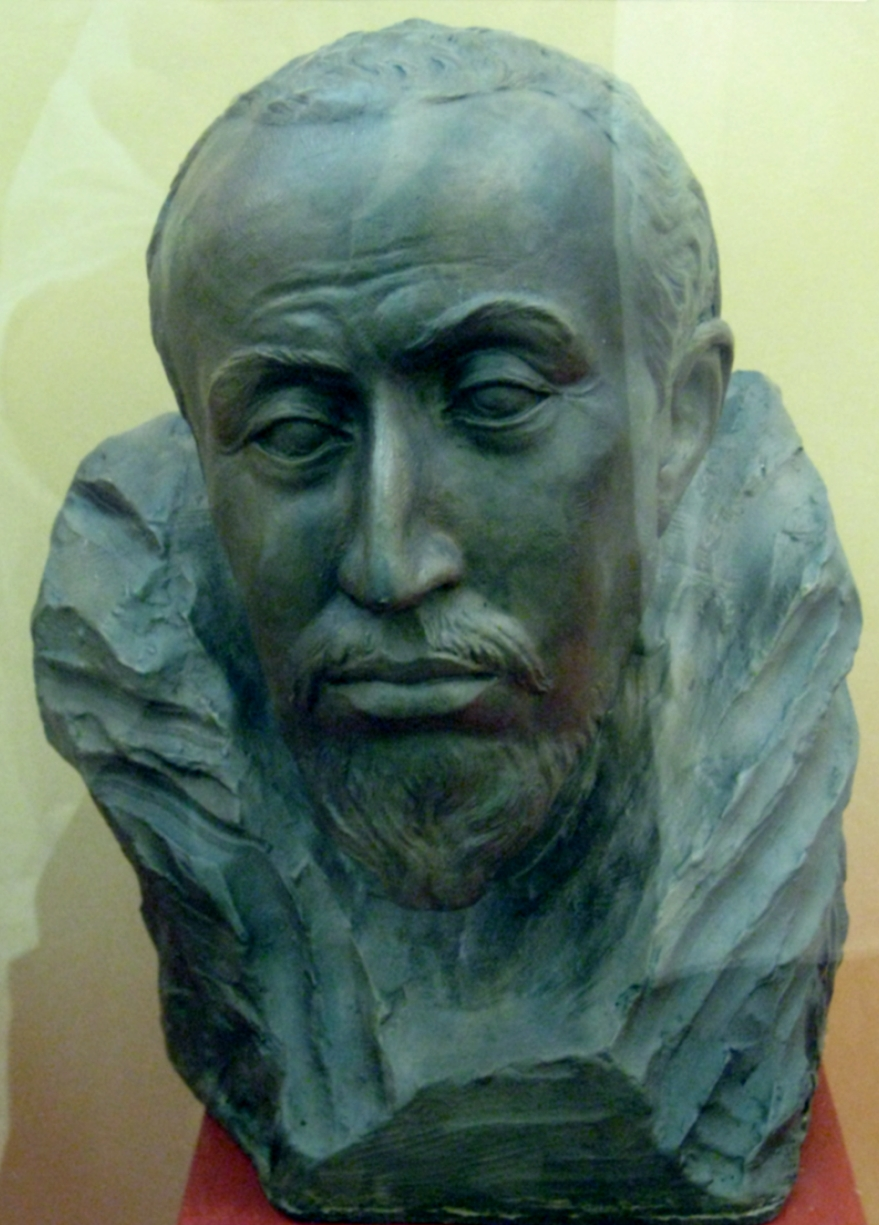
- Forensic facial reconstruction by Mikhail Gerasimov, 1963

Tsar of all Russia
- Reign: 28 March [O.S. 18 March] 1584 – 17 January [O.S. 7 January] 1598
- Coronation: 31 May 1584
- Predecessor: Ivan IV
- Successor: Irina (disputed) or Boris
- Born: 31 May 1557; Moscow, Russia
- Died: 17 January 1598 (aged 40); Moscow, Russia
- Burial: Archangel Cathedral, Kremlin
- Spouse: Irina Godunova (m. 1575)
- Issue: Tsarevna Feodosiya of Russia
Names
- Feodor Ivanovich
- Dynasty: Rurik
- Father: Ivan IV of Russia
- Mother: Anastasia Romanovna
- Religion: Russian Orthodox

Feodor I Ioannovich (Russian: Феодор I Иoаннович) or Fyodor I Ivanovich (Russian: Фёдор I Иванович; 31 May 1557 – 17 January 1598), nicknamed the Blessed (Блаженный), was Tsar of all Russia from 1584 until his death in 1598.

Feodor's mother died when he was three, and he grew up in the shadow of his father, Ivan the Terrible. He was a pious man of retiring disposition and possibly suffered from mental disability. He took little interest in politics, and the country was effectively administered in his name by Boris Godunov, the brother of his beloved wife Irina. He died without surviving children and was succeeded by Godunov as tsar, marking the end of the rule of the Rurik dynasty and spurring Russia's descent into the catastrophic Time of Troubles.

He is listed in the Great Synaxaristes of the Eastern Orthodox Church, with his feast day on 7 January (O.S.).

== Early life ==
Feodor was born on 31 May 1557 in Moscow, the third son of Ivan the Terrible by his first wife Anastasia Romanovna. He was baptized at the Chudov Monastery and his godfather was Macarius, the metropolitan of the Russian Orthodox Church. Although he was the sixth and youngest child of his mother, he grew up with only one older brother, Ivan Ivanovich, because all his other older siblings had died in infancy. His mother also died by the time Feodor was three years old, and her death greatly affected his father, who had been very attached to his wife. He also took a series of other wives, but Feodor's only surviving half-sibling, Dmitry of Uglich, was born on 19 October 1582 to the tsar's last wife.

Feodor therefore grew up in the shadow of a distant father, with no mother to succor him, and only his older brother Ivan Ivanovich for family solidarity. He grew to be sickly of health and diffident of temperament. He was extremely pious by nature, spending hours in prayer and contemplation. He was very fond of visiting churches, and would often cause the bells to be rung according to a special tradition in the Russian Orthodox Church. For this reason, he is known to history as Feodor the Bellringer. He is also listed in the Great Synaxaristes of the Orthodox Church, with his feast day on 7 January (O.S.).

In May 1562, as Ivan IV went on a campaign against the Grand Duchy of Lithuania, he left both tsareviches in Moscow and ordered Ivan Ivanovich “to write in his name to the commanders in all the towns about taking care of things and ordered all affairs of the land to his son Tsarevich Ivan". Upon his return in the autumn, the two tsareviches met the tsar on the Arbat, along with the metropolitan. During the next military campaign in the following year, the two sons were not given any formal responsibilities, and at the end of 1564, Ivan IV took his sons with him in the procession to Aleksandrovskaya Sloboda, where he would stay for most of the remainder of his reign. In 1577, Feodor was left by his father in Novgorod with the boyars Dmitry and Boris Godunov and others, including a tutor.

Feodor did not play any role in foreign affairs, whereas his brother is mentioned as a participant in military campaigns and political discussions in razriady every year from 1567 until his death. Despite this, Feodor was selected as a candidate for the Polish throne in 1572–1573 and 1574–1576, besides his father himself. Feodor and his brother were not given a new title by their father, and in August 1581, the papal envoy in Russia, Antonio Possevino, was ordered to be told by the tsar that Russian documents did not need to be written in the name of both the tsar and the tsareviches because "my son Ivan has not yet been honored with the name of sovereign and my son Fyodor has not attained the age when he can rule the state with us". In the testament of Ivan IV, which has only survived in an 18th-century copy and is dated by historians to the 1570s, Feodor's brother was blessed with the tsardom along with most of the tsar's personal domain, with Feodor being given an appanage; however, the testament lost its validity following the sudden death of Ivan Ivanovich.

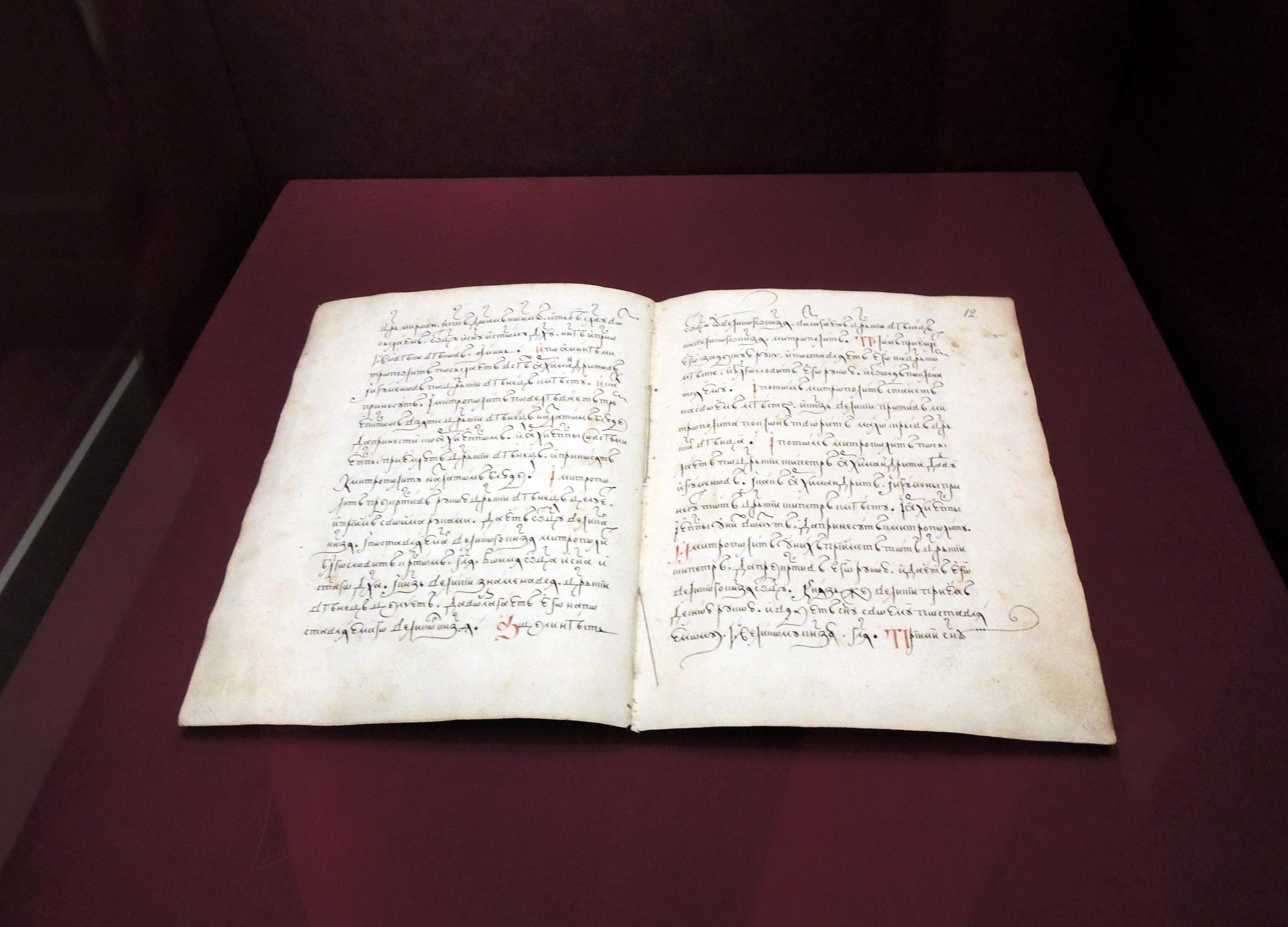
Coronation order of Feodor, 1584

On 9 November 1581, Ivan Ivanovich died, with Antonio Possevino asserting in his 1586 book that he had been killed by his father in a fit of rage. His death left only Feodor and Dmitry as the remaining sons of the tsar. Feodor became tsar not only because of his brother's death, but also because his brother did not have any children, despite being married three times. He lived very differently to his elder brother due to his physical weakness and possible mental deficiencies. According to the metropolitan, Feodor was blessed by his father to succeed him, "to be anointed and crowned with that crown and diadem of the tsars ... [as] your father's heritor [otchichem] and your grandfather's heritor [dedichem] and the heir [naslednik] of the Russian tsardom".

In the spring of 1583, Feodor accompanied his father's army on a military campaign against rebels around Kazan, along with two dyadki (servants). The two were not important boyars, but the first one belonged to the clan of Boris Godunov and would achieve the rank of boyar and dvoretsky shortly after Feodor ascended the throne, while the second one was another supporter of the Godunovs who would be promoted from dumny dvoryanin to okolnichy in 1586. Around the same time, Ivan IV was looking for his eighth wife in England and consulted his physician Robert Jacob about relatives of Queen Elizabeth I who would be suitable. Jacob suggested Lady Mary Hastings, and Ivan told Elizabeth that if the two were to have sons, they would be given appanages "according to their sovereign rank" (po ikh gosudarskomu chinu) and be treated "equally in degree with Fyodor" (v rovenstve po stepeni so tsarevichem Fedorom). However, the plan did not go anywhere.

== Reign ==
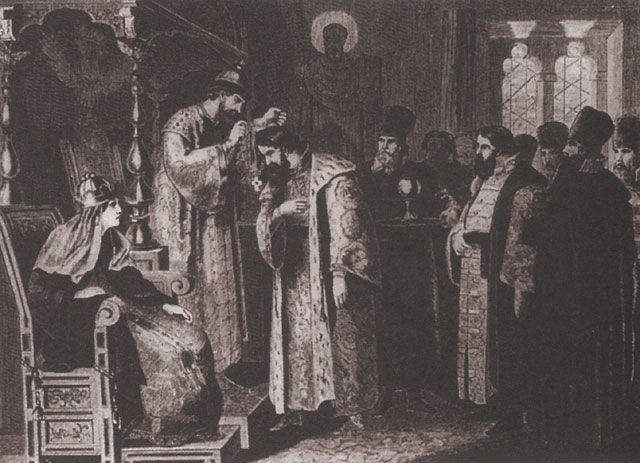
Feodor Ioannovich presents a golden chain to Boris Godunov by Aleksey Kivshenko

Ivan IV died on 28 March [O.S. 18 March] 1584, and Feodor succeeded his father as tsar. Two months later, on 31 May 1584, he was crowned as the tsar and autocrat of all Russia at the Dormition Cathedral in Moscow. (Note: Although the term samoderzhets (autocrat) did not become standard in the title of the tsar until the 17th century, Feodor was the first ruler to be crowned as both the tsar and autocrat of Russia.) The coronation of Feodor was slightly modified to account for his father's recent conquests and the increasingly Byzantine practice of the tsar's court. As Feodor was Ivan's third son, the speechmakers for the coronation omitted the mention of "first" or "firstborn" in reference to heredity, which in the record of the coronation of his father, it was stated that the ancient custom of Russian grand princes was to bestow the rulership on "their firstborn sons". As a result, Metropolitan Dionysius simply stated that "the tsars and grand princes gave the Tsardom and Grand Principality of Russia to their sons [synom svoim]".

Due to the only surviving testament of Ivan IV being outdated and there being no reference of another testament having been written, historians have debated whether there was an informal regency council or not. The historian Ruslan Skrynnikov attempted to prove that the Zemsky Sobor (assembly of the land) elected Feodor as tsar, while Aleksandr Zimin rejected the idea. Lev Cherepnin tried to prove that the assembly had met but Feodor was not elected as he was already recognized as the new tsar. The few contemporary Russian sources available do not state that an election took place, such as the Stoglav of the church council of 2 July 1584 which states that Feodor was placed on the throne "according to the blessing of his father... having taken up the scepter of the Russian tsardom". At his coronation, Feodor was also claimed to have said that his father gave him the title "Tsar and Grand Prince, inheritor from his father and grandfather of the Russian tsardom".

Foreign sources like the account by Jerome Bowes described Feodor's accession as normal and without any mention of a council. Another English source from Jerome Horsey described how the boyars "were appointed to settle and dispose his [Ivan the Terrible's] son Fyodor Ivanovich, having sworn one another, and all the nobility and officers whosoever" before a "parliament" met on 4 May. However, both of the English reports were published soon after the events, and therefore may contain omissions due to political reasons, while the originals have not survived. Polish and Vatican reports mention the expectation of an election taking place, due to Feodor's "madness", but the letter of the emissary Lew Sapieha tells how the Russian pristav shared the story of Feodor sitting on the throne according to the blessing of his father. Pontus De la Gardie, the Swedish viceroy of Livonia, wrote a letter on 16 April to the viceroy of Novgorod about prolonging the truce between Sweden and Russia, because he had learned that the tsar had died and "in his place they had elected as grand prince his son Fyodor to the rank of his father and crowned him". The answering letter did not correct the error about Feodor being elected and simply stated that "with God’s help according to the blessing of his father, his son our sovereign tsar and grand prince Fyodor Ivanovich came to rule his states".

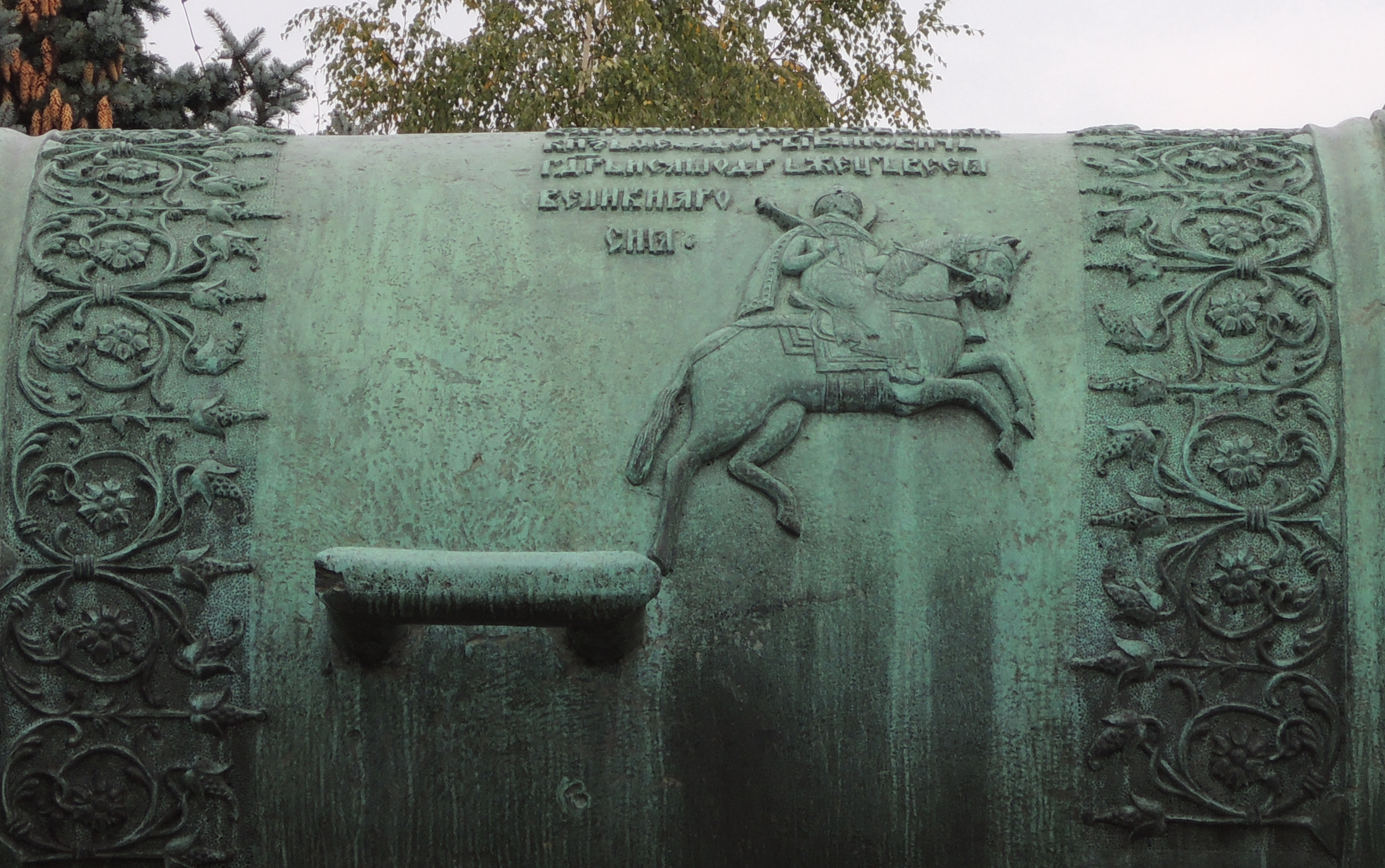
Depiction of Feodor on the Tsar Cannon

Feodor was only the nominal ruler: his wife's brother and trusted minister Boris Godunov legitimized himself, after Ivan IV's death, as the de facto regent for the weak and disabled Feodor. As a result, the government was mainly in the hands of the boyars and Feodor's brother-in-law. By the summer of 1584, the two boyar clans had effected a rapprochement, and Luka Novosiltsev, the Russian ambassador to the Holy Roman Empire, referred to Godunov in November as "the ruler of the land, a great and gracious lord". By the end of the 1580s, Boris Godunov was able to deal with foreign powers independently, using a variety of titles in addition to that of equerry, which he received in 1584. Feodor's wife Irina also began to play a role in the affairs of the state, although it is not clear if she had any real political power. Three charters regarding grants to monasteries from 1587 to 1597 are in the name of both the tsar and tsaritsa.

In May 1586, the Shuyskys, backed by the metropolitan of the Russian Orthodox Church and the people of Moscow, organized a petition in the name of the Zemsky Sobor that was addressed to Feodor and urged him to divorce his wife, who was childless. Feodor rejected the proposition, and Godunov waited until the return of the Russian embassy from Poland on 1 October, where he may have received confirmation of his suspicions that the Shuyskys were in contact with Polish lords. In the autumn, the Shuyskys were banished from the capital and Boris Godunov persecuted them heavily in the following year. In addition, Metropolitan Dionysius was removed from his post. Although Boris Godunov focused on strengthening the autocracy like Feodor's father, he was not opposed to the princely elite, and the composition of the duma was predominated by the highest-ranking boyar elite.

=== Foreign policy ===
Unlike his father, Feodor had no enthusiasm for maintaining exclusive trading rights with the Kingdom of England. Feodor declared his kingdom open to all foreigners, and dismissed the English ambassador Sir Jerome Bowes, whose pomposity had been tolerated by Feodor's father. Elizabeth I sent a new ambassador, Giles Fletcher, the Elder, to demand of Boris Godunov that he convince the tsar to reconsider. The negotiations failed because Fletcher addressed Feodor with two of his titles omitted. Even after this setback, Elizabeth continued to address Feodor on that topic in half appealing, half reproachful letters. She proposed an alliance between Russia and England, something which she had refused to do when it had been sought by Feodor's father, but he turned her down.

Some boyars may also have been interested in a Habsburg succession to the throne as early as 1584, which would have meant the election of one of the brothers of Rudolf II. As the Habsburg court was interested in preventing Polish expansion into Russia, discussions were held in Prague, and in 1589, a Habsburg envoy reported that Boris Godunov wanted Archduke Maximilian, who was a candidate for the Polish throne, to be Feodor's successor. Andrey Shchelkalov, the head of the Posolsky prikaz (ambassadorial office), made a secret proposal to the Habsburg envoy in 1593 to have Feodor's daughter Feodosiya married to one of the Habsburg princes; however, Feodosiya died and the proposal was no longer being considered.

== Death ==
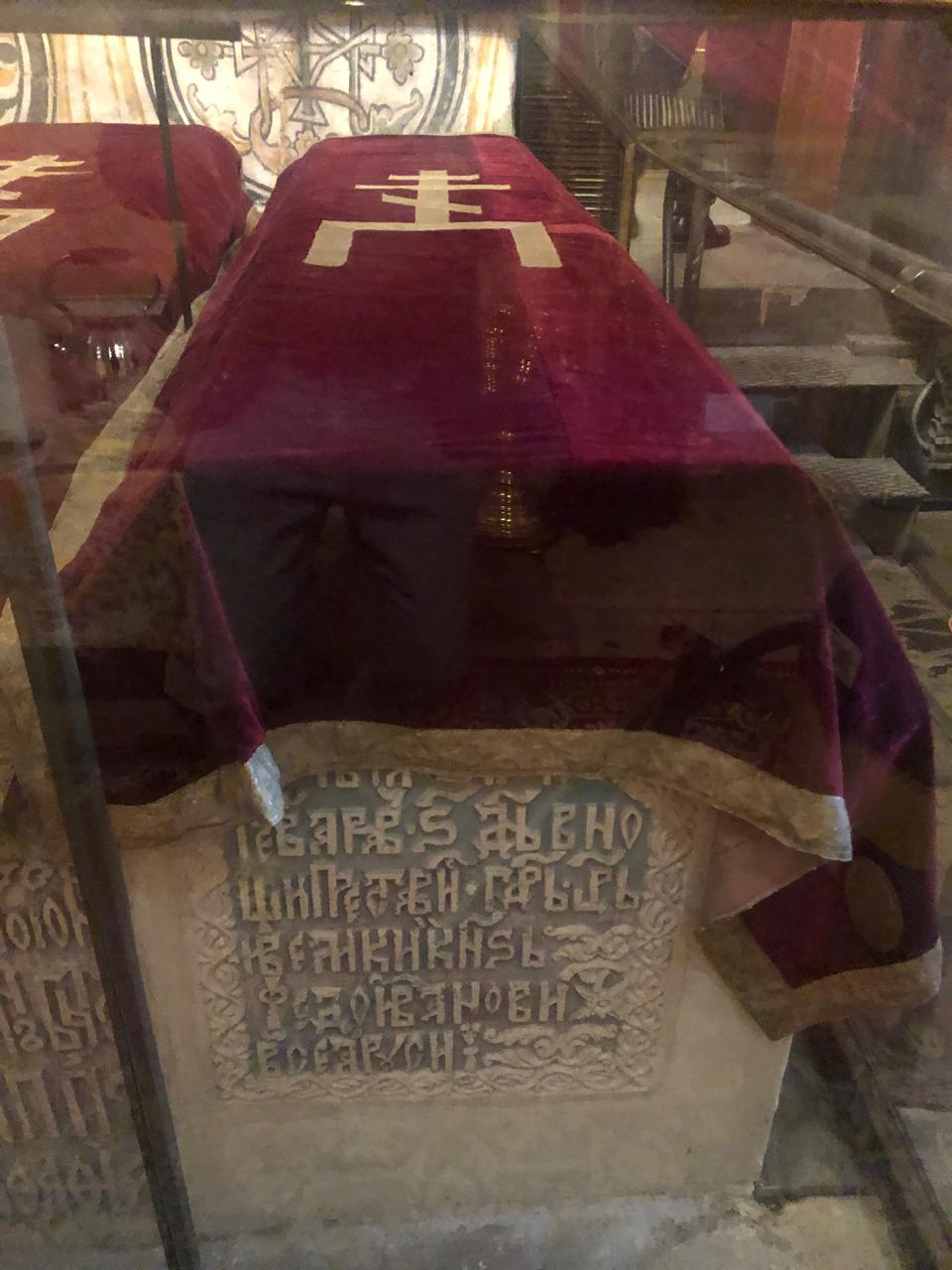
Tomb of Feodor in the Cathedral of the Archangel in Moscow

Feodor died on 17 January [O.S. 7 January] 1598 in Moscow. He was buried at the Archangel Cathedral in the Moscow Kremlin. Feodor produced no sons, despite his efforts to have children.

After the end of the 40-day period of mourning, the Zemsky Sobor convened and elected Boris Godunov as the new tsar. The traditional view among historians was that supporters of Godunov dominated the assembly; however, Vasily Klyuchevsky concluded that the assembly was entirely conventional in its composition at the time. Klyuchevsky argued that if there was a campaign in favor of Godunov, it did not alter the composition of the assembly, and thus Godunov was legitimately elected. On the other hand, contemporaries of the Time of Troubles viewed the election of Godunov as immoral due to his perceived role in the death of Tsarevich Dmitry of Uglich.

== Legacy ==
Feodor's failure to sire other children brought an end to the centuries-old central branch of the Rurik dynasty, although many princes of later times are descendants of Rurik as well. The termination of the dynasty would later result in the Time of Troubles. Paul Bushkovitch disagrees with the assumption by historians that the elections of tsars that took place after the death of Feodor was simply caused by the extinction of the Rurik dynasty, stating that from at least 1450, the succession of monarchs relied on the public designation of the tsar's successor, rather than automatic primogeniture.

Contemporaries are unanimous that Feodor's reign was a period of prosperity and stability in Russia, as the government secured peace for Russia's borders, and the economic policy of the government led to a revival in the economy during the last decade of the century; however, much of the credit goes to Boris Godunov, who was called "incomparable" by the Russian envoys to Persia in reference to his intelligence and unique position in government.

The veneration of Feodor began shortly after his death and Patriarch Job composed the Tale of the Honorable Tsar and Grand Prince of all Russia Fedor Ivanovich. The tale says that Boris Godunov, who built a fort and within it a church dedicated to Sergius of Radonezh, stationed his army there in hopes of saving Moscow from "pagan barbarians". Feodor prayed before an icon of the Mother of God, seeking intercession in the tradition of his ancestor Dmitry Donskoy, while Patriarch Job led a procession, parading the icon around Moscow and then to the Church of St. Sergius to appeal for divine help.

=== In popular culture ===
His reign was dramatised by Aleksey Konstantinovich Tolstoy in his verse drama Tsar Fyodor Ioannovich (1868).

== Family ==
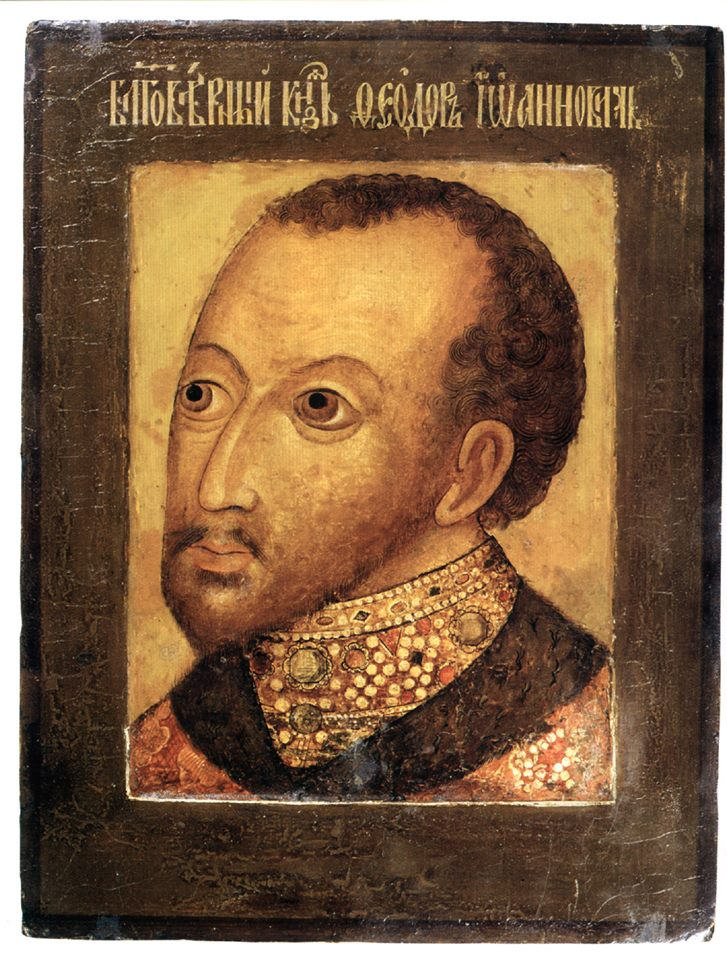
Portrait of Feodor in the Cathedral of the Archangel in Moscow, 1630s

In 1575, Feodor married Irina Godunova, a sister of Ivan's minister Boris Godunov. (Note: Some historians have dated the marriage to 1580 due to erroneous speculation by Nikolai Karamzin that the marriage took place at the same time that Boris Godunov was promoted to the rank of boyar.) The exact date of the marriage is not known, but the evidence suggests that Feodor, along with his brother, were married by 5 March, and that their weddings probably took place shortly after their father's wedding the same year. Daniel Prinz von Buchau, the ambassador of the Holy Roman Empire who was in Moscow from November 1575 to February 1576, wrote that "both sons, the older one 20 years old and the younger one 18, both still without whiskers, entered into marriage with some or other daughters of boyars in the same year when we were there".

Although the marriage was arranged by the tsar and the couple knew nothing of each other before their wedding day, they went on to have a strong marriage. The lonely Feodor soon grew extremely close to his wife, to a degree that was unusual for that period and milieu. The two shared a relationship of warmth and trust which was the support of Feodor's life for as long as he lived. He entrusted her to handle tsarist responsibilities, including signing decrees in his name.

Feodor and Irina's marriage did not immediately produce children, and may not have even been consummated for some years. It was only in 1592, after almost twelve years of marriage and numerous attempts by the court to cure her perceived barrenness (at the time, the wife was always blamed for the infertility of a couple), that Tsaritsa Irina gave birth to a daughter, who was named Feodosiya (29 May 1592 – 25 January 1594) after her father. Feodor and his wife doted on their daughter, but she died aged two in 1594. There were no other children from the marriage. The boyar families rival to the Godunov clan attempted to convince Feodor to divorce and re-marry, but he always rejected the idea.

== See also ==
- Bibliography of Russian history (1223–1613)
- Family tree of Russian monarchs

== Bibliography ==
- Bushkovitch, Paul (18 March 2021). Succession to the Throne in Early Modern Russia: The Transfer of Power 1450–1725. Cambridge University Press. ISBN 978-1-108-47934-9.
- Gruber, Isaiah (15 May 2012). Orthodox Russia in Crisis: Church and Nation in the Time of Troubles. Cornell University Press. ISBN 978-1-5017-5738-9.
- Madariaga, Isabel de (25 September 2006). Ivan the Terrible. Yale University Press. ISBN 978-0-300-14376-8.
- Martin, Russell E. (15 June 2012). A Bride for the Tsar: Bride-Shows and Marriage Politics in Early Modern Russia. Cornell University Press. ISBN 978-1-5017-5665-8.
- Miller, David B. (5 November 2010). Saint Sergius of Radonezh, His Trinity Monastery, and the Formation of the Russian Identity. Cornell University Press. ISBN 978-1-5017-5661-0.
- Pavlov, A. P. (2006). "Fedor Ivanovich and Boris Godunov (1584–1605)". In Perrie, Maureen (ed.). The Cambridge History of Russia: Volume 1: From Early Rus' to 1689. Cambridge University Press. pp. 264–285. doi:10.1017/CHOL9780521812276. ISBN 978-1-107-63942-3.
- Pushkareva, Natalia (16 September 2016). Women in Russian History: From the Tenth to the Twentieth Century. Routledge. ISBN 978-1-315-48043-5.
- Sashalmi, Endre (2022). Russian Notions of Power and State in a European Perspective, 1462–1725: Assessing the Significance of Peter's Reign. Academic Studies Press. doi:10.2307/j.ctv2xszr80. ISBN 978-1-64469-417-6. JSTOR j.ctv2xszr80.

Regnal titles
Preceded by Ivan IV	Tsar of Russia; 1584–1598	Succeeded by Boris I
