= Jacobini =

Jacobini is an Italian surname. Notable people with the surname include:

- Diomira Jacobini (1899–1959), Italian actress
- Domenico Jacobini (1837–1900), Italian cardinal
- Luigi Jacobini (1832–1887), Italian cardinal
- Maria Jacobini (1892–1944), Italian actress
- Paolo Jacobini (1919-2003), Italian footballer
