= Nancy Jacob =

American photographer and artist

Nancy Jacob is an American photographer and artist.

Jacob lives in Hallowell, Maine. She has been photographing and painting the wildlands of Maine since at least 1982, when her work was exhibited in the Colby College Museum of Art. Her photography often features dri-ki - a Maine regionalism meaning "dead timber, dry branches, driftwood", or land containing such.

Of these scenes, Jacob says:

"Logging companies own two-thirds of Maine. Logging pioneered this look. Regardless of how we use our earth, regardless of how we see our environment, we find what we need from the Creator. All is not lost if it evokes our dreaming. I have spent much time in these haunts in daydreaming visits. I have taken these photos soundly in the belief that the beauty and power of nature is not lost through seeming devastation. It is beautiful."

Her photographs are often displayed as large (40in x 40in) Giclée prints. Of this process, she remarks "I am a witchdoctor who dispenses art as a cure.”

She had a sister who died of leukemia.
