= Jacobia =

Jacobia may refer to:

- Jacobia, Texas, unincorporated community in the United States
- Jacobia, a Latin name of the town of Jakobstad, Finland
- Jacobia brauni, a synonym for the jumping spider Hasarius adansoni
- Jacobia, a previous illegitimate name for the fungal genus Contumyces
