= Jerome Bowes =

English diplomat (died 1616)

Sir Jerome Bowes
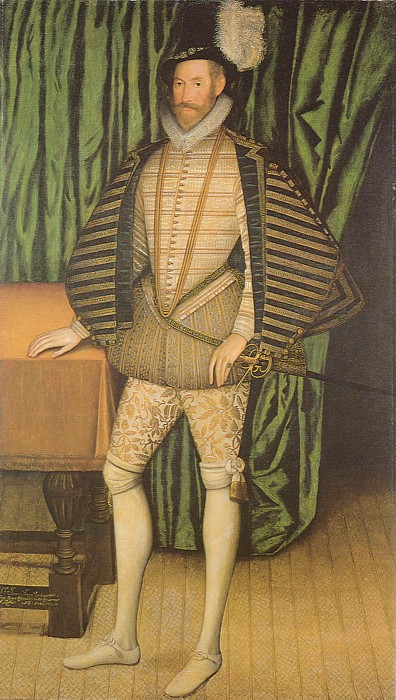
- Portrait, 1583

English Ambassador to Russia
- In office 1583–1584

Member of Parliament for Lancaster
- In office 1601–1601

Member of Parliament for Reading
- In office 1604–1604

Sir Jerome Bowes (died 1616) was an English ambassador to Russia and Member of Parliament in England.

== Early life ==
He was born into a Durham family, the son of John Bowes, and his wife Ann, née Gunville, whose family were from Gorleston, then in Suffolk. His name is included in the list of the gentlemen who followed Edward Clinton, to France, on his expedition to avenge the fall of Calais. It has been inferred from a casual mention of him by John Stowe that he was a client of Robert Dudley, 1st Earl of Leicester in 1571, but he was banished from court six years later for slanderous speech against him.

== Diplomatic mission to Russia ==
Bowes was restored to favour, and in 1583 was appointed ambassador to Russia. Fedor Pisemsky had travelled to England in 1581, and the diplomatic background included trade matters, and a proposed marriage of Ivan IV of Russia to Lady Mary Hastings, daughter of Francis Hastings, 2nd Earl of Huntingdon. In June 1583 Bowes set sail with Pisemsky for Russia, on what turned out to be a fruitless mission. John Milton, in his Brief History of Moscovia, gives an account of this embassy, taken from Richard Hakluyt. There are some additional anecdotes recorded in Samuel Pepys's Diary, told to him by a group of customs officers in 1662, eighty years after the event, and in Samuel Collins's Present State of Russia (1671).

In Collins' account Ivan IV of Russia is said to have nailed the French ambassador's hat to his head. Bowes at his next audience put on his hat, and the tsar threatened him with the like punishment. Bowes replied that he did not represent the cowardly king of France, but the invincible queen of England, "who does not vail her bonnet nor bare her head to any prince living". The tsar commended his bravery and took him into favour. Bowes is also said to have tamed a wild horse so effectually that the animal fell dead under him. Milton describes the pomp of the reception and how the ambassador refused to submit to etiquette and put the letters into the hands of the chancellor, insisting upon his right to give them to the emperor himself. The tsar, irritated by the assertion of Elizabeth's equality with the French and Spanish kings, lost patience when Bowes, to his question "what of the emperor?" replied that her father, Henry VIII, had the Holy Roman Emperor in his pay. Ivan hinted that Bowes might be thrown out of the window, to which Bowes replied that the queen would know how to revenge any injury done to her ambassador. Ivan's anger gave place to admiration, and he again raised the possibility of a marriage to one of the queen's relatives. But he died soon after, and with his successor, Feodor I, the anti-English Dutch faction came into power.

Alfred Nicolas Rambaud, in his History of Russia, blamed Bowes for clumsiness and lack of tact. The ambassador was imprisoned, threatened, and at last dismissed by Feodor. When ready to embark he sent back the new tsar's letters and "paltry present".

== Later years ==
There is only fragmentary evidence for Bowes' subsequent activities. In a report by the lord chief baron of the exchequer he appears in a discreditable light, as having fraudulently dealt with a will under which he claimed (the record is undated, but assigned to 1587 in the Calendar of State Papers, Domestic). On 5 February 1592 a special licence was granted him to make drinking-glasses in England and Ireland for twelve years; his will indicates that he later renewed the licence. In 1597 the parishioners of St Ann Blackfriars built, at their own cost a warehouse for his use, beneath an extension to their church, on land which they had purchased but on which he held the lease. They also paid him £133. He was elected to parliament in 1601 for Lancaster and 1604 for Reading. Russian diplomatic documents name Bowes as one of the English officials who were looking after the embassy of Grigoriy Mikulin in 1600-1601.

By 1599 he was living at Charing Cross, where, in 1607 his house was robbed in a well-documented case, in which a female servant was murdered. Bowes was buried on 28 March 1616 in Hackney Church. A portrait of him, painted in the year of his embassy, is in the Suffolk Collection.

== Writings ==
In his retirement from court he translated from the French an Apology for the Christians of France ... of the reformed religion (1579).

== Notes ==
Parliament of England
Preceded by Sir Thomas Hesketh; Edward Hubberd	Member of Parliament for Lancaster; 1601; With: Sir Carew Reynell	Succeeded by Sir Thomas Hesketh; Thomas Fanshawe
Preceded by Francis Moore; Anthony Blagrave	Member of Parliament for Reading; 1604; With: Francis Moore	Succeeded by Francis Moore; Robert Knollys
