= Robert Jacob (physician) =

English physician (died 1588)

- Died: 1588
- Occupation: Physician

Robert Jacob (died 1588) was an English physician. He was a court physician to Elizabeth I and later Ivan IV of Russia.

== Biography ==
Jacob was the eldest son of Giles Jacob of London, was entered at Merchant Taylors' School on 21 January 1563 – 1564 (Register, ed. Robinson, i. 4). He matriculated as a sizar of Trinity College, Cambridge, on 12 November 1565, proceeded B.A. in 1569–1570, was elected a fellow, and in 1573 commenced M.A. He graduated M.D. at Basle, and was incorporated at Cambridge on 15 May 1579.

He became physician to Queen Elizabeth I, who in 1581 sent him, at Tsar Ivan IV's request, to the Russian court, where he attended the tsarina, and acquired a reputation which still survives. Jacob recommended Lady Mary Hastings to the tsar for his seventh wife. Happily for the lady, the tsar died before the conclusion of the negotiations, which were opened in 1583 with the sanction of Elizabeth. Jacob returned to England with Sir Jerome Bowes, the English envoy in Russia, about March 1584. The Russian Company charged him with trading on his own account.

On 21 May 1583, he was admitted a licentiate of the Royal College of Physicians in London, a candidate on 12 November 1585, and a fellow on 15 March 1586. In the latter year he went out to Russia a second time, accompanied by a midwife to attend to Irina Godunova, wife of Tsar Feodor I of Russia. He died abroad, unmarried, in 1588 (Probate Act Book, P. C. C., June 1588).
