= Jacobus (disambiguation) =

Jacobus may refer to:

- Jacobus, an English gold coin of the reign of James I
- Jacobus (horse), an American race horse
- Jacobus (name), a given name and surname
- Jacobus, Pennsylvania, United States

== See also ==
- Jacob (disambiguation)
