= Surgut-1 Power Station =

Oil-fired power station in Surgut, Russia

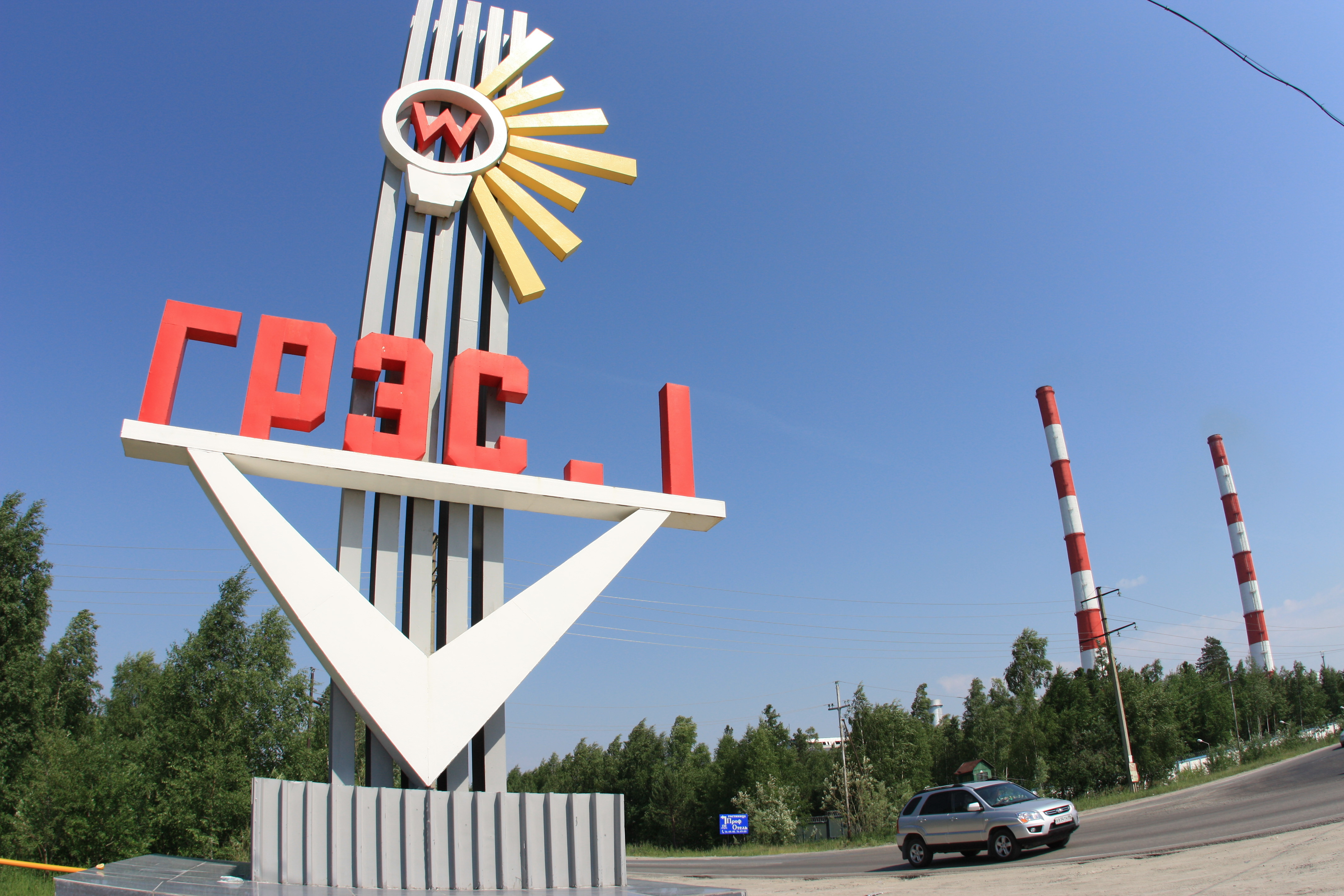
- Official name: Сургутская ГРЭС-1
- Country: Russia
- Location: Surgut
- Coordinates: 61°16′46″N 73°29′20″E
- Status: Operational
- Commission date: February 1972
- Owner: OGK-2

Thermal power station
- Primary fuel: Natural gas

Power generation
- Units operational: 13 x 210 MW; 2 x 180 MW; 1 x 178 MW; 1 x 12 MW (reserve)
- Make and model: LMZ; Electrosila
- Nameplate capacity: 3,333 MW

External links
- Website: https://ogk2.ru/eng/about-ogk-2/branches/surgutskaya-gres/
- Commons: Related media on Commons

The Surgut-1 Power Station (Russian: Сургутская ГРЭС-1) is a gas-fired power station located in Surgut, Russia. It has an installed capacity of 3,333 MW. The facility began operations in February 1972.

On 28 June 2011, a gas explosion occurred at the power station. At least 12 people were injured.

== See also ==
- List of natural gas power stations
- List of largest power stations in the world
- List of power stations in Russia
- Surgut-2 Power Station
