= Surgut-2 Power Station =

Gas-fired power station in Surgut, Russia

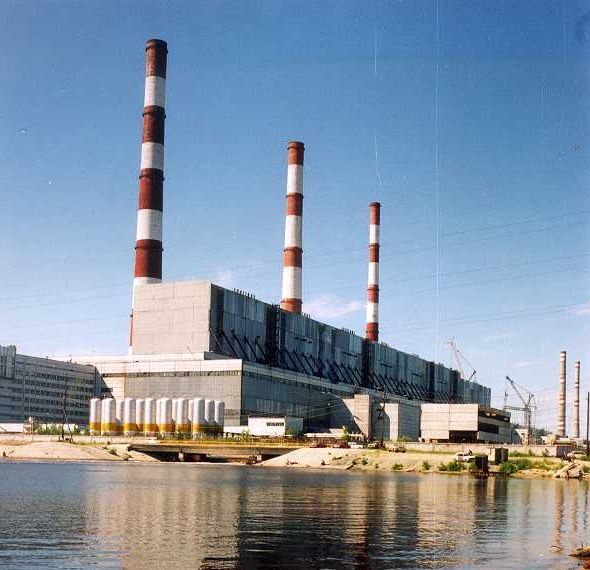
- Official name: Сургутская ГРЭС-2
- Country: Russia
- Location: Surgut
- Coordinates: 61°16′46″N 73°30′45″E
- Status: Operational
- Owner: Unipro (company)

Thermal power station
- Primary fuel: Petroleum gas (70 %), Natural gas (30 %)
- Combined cycle?: Yes

Power generation
- Units operational: 6 × 800 MW; 2 × 400 MW
- Nameplate capacity: 5687.1 MW
- Annual net output: 39.97 TWh

External links
- Commons: Related media on Commons

The Surgut-2 Power Station on the Ob River in Russia is the second-largest gas-fired power station in the world, and largest in Russia with an installed capacity of 5687.1 MW in 2022. As of 2021 it is the gas-fired power plant (of those Climate Trace was able to monitor) which emits the most greenhouse gas with 31.5 million tonnes.

== Expansion in 2011 ==
Expansion of the power plant involved the construction of two ≈400 MW units by December 2011, costing nearly RUB 19 billion, which increased its original capacity of 4800 MW to 5597.1 MW. The two new blocks do not use dried oil gas as is the case in the other six generators. They consume natural gas as a fuel, utilizing combined cycle, with overall efficiency rates of 56%. General Electric was the manufacturer and supplier of the generators.

== See also ==
- List of power stations in Russia
- Surgut-1 Power Station
