= Jacobian =

In mathematics, a Jacobian, named for Carl Gustav Jacob Jacobi, may refer to:

- Jacobian matrix and determinant
- Jacobian elliptic functions
- Jacobian conjecture
- Jacobian variety
- Jacobian ideal
- Intermediate Jacobian
- Generalized Jacobian
- Robot Jacobian

== Given name ==
- Jacobian Guillory (born 2000), American football player
