= Jacoby (surname) =

Jacoby (English: /ˈdʒækəbi/, German pronunciation: [jakˈoːbi]) is a surname. Notable people with the surname include:

== People ==
- Arnold Jacoby (1913–2002), Norwegian writer and translator
- Brook Jacoby (born 1959), American baseball player
- Charles H. Jacoby Jr. (born 1954), United States Army general
- Dave Jacoby (powerlifter), American powerlifter
- David Jacoby (politician) (born 1956), American politician
- Don Jacoby (1920–1992), American trumpeter and teacher
- Dustin Jacoby (born 1988), American martial artist
- Elsa Jacoby (1910–1994), Australian actress and soprano
- Erich Jacoby (1885–1941), Estonian architect
- Felix Jacoby (1876–1959), German classicist and philologist
- Georg Jacoby (1883–1964), German film director and screenwriter, son of Wilhelm Jacoby
- Hans Jacoby (1904–1963), German screenwriter
- Hans Jacoby (art director) (1898–1967), German set designer
- Hansjörg Jacoby, German curler
- Harold Jacoby (1865–1932), American astronomer
- Heinrich Jacoby (1889–1964), German educator
- James Jacoby (1933–1991), American bridge player (as Jim) and writer, son of Oswald Jacoby
- James Alfred Jacoby (1852–1909), British businessman and Liberal politician.
- Jean Jacoby (1891–1936), Luxembourgish artist
- Jeff Jacoby (disambiguation), several people
- Jim Jacoby, American businessman and real estate developer
- Joe Jacoby (born 1959), American football player
- Johann Jacoby (1805–1877), Prussian politician
- Lex Jacoby (1930–2015), Luxembourgish writer
- Louis Jacoby (born 1942), Norwegian singer and writer
- Lydia Jacoby (born 2004), American swimmer and Olympic medalist
- Mark Jacoby (born 1947), American singer and stage performer
- Martin Jacoby (1842–1907), German musician and entomologist
- Mathieson Jacoby (1869–1915), Australian politician
- Max Jacoby (born 1977), Luxembourgish film director and screenwriter
- Megan Jacoby (born 1991), American Hyrox athlete
- Neil H. Jacoby (1909–1979), economist
- Oren Jacoby (born 1956), American director
- Oswald Jacoby (1902–1984), American bridge player
- Peter Jacoby, German curler
- Russell Jacoby (born 1945), American historian
- Susan Jacoby (born 1945), American author
- Tamar Jacoby (born 1954), American writer and academic
- Wilhelm Jacoby (1855–1925), German playwright, father of Georg Jacoby
- Antarctica's Jacoby Glacier is named for William J. Jacoby

=== Fictional character ===
- Lawrence Jacoby, character in the television series Twin Peaks

== See also ==
- Jacoby (disambiguation)
- Jacobi (disambiguation)
- Jacobi (surname)
