= Jacobi (surname) =

Jacobi (/ˈdʒækəbi/ (Note: e.g. Carl Gustav Jacob Jacobi) or /dʒəˈkoʊbi/) (Note: e.g. Abraham Jacobi) is a surname of German or Ashkenazi Jewish origin.

== People with the surname Jacobi ==
- Abraham Jacobi (1830–1919), Prussian-American revolutionary and pediatrician husband of Mary Putnam Jacobi
- Bruce Jacobi (1935–1987), American NASCAR driver
- Carl Gustav Jacob Jacobi (1804–1851), Prussian mathematician and teacher
- Carl Richard Jacobi (1908–1997), American author
- Carl Wigand Maximilian Jacobi (1775–1858), German psychiatrist
- C. Hugo Jacobi (1846-1924), American businessman and politician
- Claus Jacobi (1927–2013), German editor
- Derek Jacobi (born 1938), English actor
- Ernst Jacobi (1933–2022), German actor
- Fabian Jacobi (born 1973), German politician
- Frederick Jacobi (1891–1952), American composer
- Friedrich Heinrich Jacobi (1743–1819), German philosopher
- Georges Jacobi (1840-1906), German composer and conductor based in London
- Harry Jacobi (1925–2019), refugee from Nazi Germany who became a British rabbi
- Heinrich Otto Jacobi (1815–1864), German philologist
- Hermann Jacobi (1850–1937), German Indologist
- Hosea Jacobi (1841–1925), Chief Rabbi of Zagreb and Croatia (de facto Chief Rabbi of Yugoslavia)
- Johann Jacobi (1805–1877), German socialist politician
- Johann Christian Jacobi (1670–1750), German-born translator and dealer in religious books
- Johann Georg Jacobi (1740–1814), German poet
- Jolande Jacobi (1890–1973), Swiss psychologist
- Lotte Jacobi (1896–1990), German-American photographer
- Lou Jacobi (1913–2009), Canadian actor
- Lutz Jacobi (born 1955), Dutch politician
- Mary Corinna Putnam Jacobi (1842–1906), American physician, and suffragist; wife of Abraham Jacobi (1842 – 1906)
- Moritz von Jacobi (1801–1874), Prussian-Russian engineer
- Otto Reinhold Jacobi (1812–1901), Canadian painter
- Paul Jacobi (14 July 1887 – 13 February 1915), German naval officer
- Pavel Jacobi (15 July 1841 - 24 March 1913), Russian physician, ethnographer and socialist
- Roger Jacobi (1947–2009), British archaeologist
- Roland Jacobi (1893–1951), Hungarian table tennis player
- Valery Jacobi (1834–1902), Russian painter
- Victor Jacobi (1883–1921), Hungarian composer

== See also ==
- Jacoby (surname)
- Jacob (name)
- Jacobs (surname)
- Jacobsen (surname)
- Jakob (disambiguation)
- Jakobi (surname)
