= Jakoby =

Jakoby is a surname. Notable people with the surname include:

- Heidi Jakoby, American politician
- Július Jakoby, Slovak painter
- Richard Jakoby, German music pedagogue
- Ruth Kerr Jakoby, American neurosurgeon

== See also ==
- Jacoby (disambiguation)
- Jacobi (disambiguation)
