= Arthur Benni =

Arthur William Benni
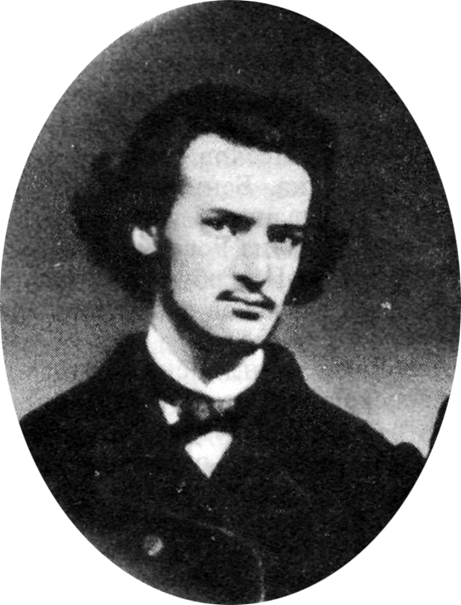
- Born: Arthur Wilhelm Benni; 27 November 1839; Tomaszów-Rawski, Congress Poland, Russian Empire
- Died: 27 December 1867 (aged 28); Rome, Papal States
- Other names: Artur Wilhelm Benni, Артур Иванович (Иоганнович) Бенни
- Occupations: Journalist, political activist, translator
- Known for: 19th century Socialist movement in Russia

Arthur William Benni (27 November 1839, Tomaszów-Rawski, Congress Poland – 27 December 1867, Rome, Italy) was a Polish-born English citizen, known in Russia (where his name was spelled Арту′р Ива′нович Бе′нни) as a journalist, Hertzen associate, Socialist activist and women liberation commune-founder. He served a three months prison sentence as part of the "32 Process", was deported from the country and died in 1867 in Rome hospital, after having been injured, as a member of the Giuseppe Garibaldi's squad. Arthur Benni's activities and persona caused controversy in Russia where rumours of him being a spy and a 3rd Department agent were being spread, much to his outrage and distress. Ivan Turgenev and Nikolai Leskov did much to clear Benni's name. The latter (who chose Benni as a prototype for Rainer, the No Way Out novel's revolutionary character) wrote a posthumous essay on him called The Mystery Man.

== Biography ==
Arthur Benni was born 27 November 1839 (1840, according to other sources) to a Jewish-born father and English mother, the fourth child in the family; he had two brothers, Fryderyk Emanuel Hermann (1834–1900) and Karol Abraham Henryk (1843–1916), and two sisters, Amalia Anna (b. 1830) and Maria Rachela (1836–1909). His father, Jan Jakub Benni (1800–1863), a Hebraist scholar, was an evangelical pastor in Tomaszów. Although a Polish native he, much under the influence of his wife (who's never even attempted to learn Polish language) was keeping an "English house", bringing his sons up in a 'knighthood' tradition and gave them a classic primary education, so that Arthur, as he at the age of ten joined the local lyceum, felt, in his own words, "more a Spartan or Roman man, than a Polish citizen."

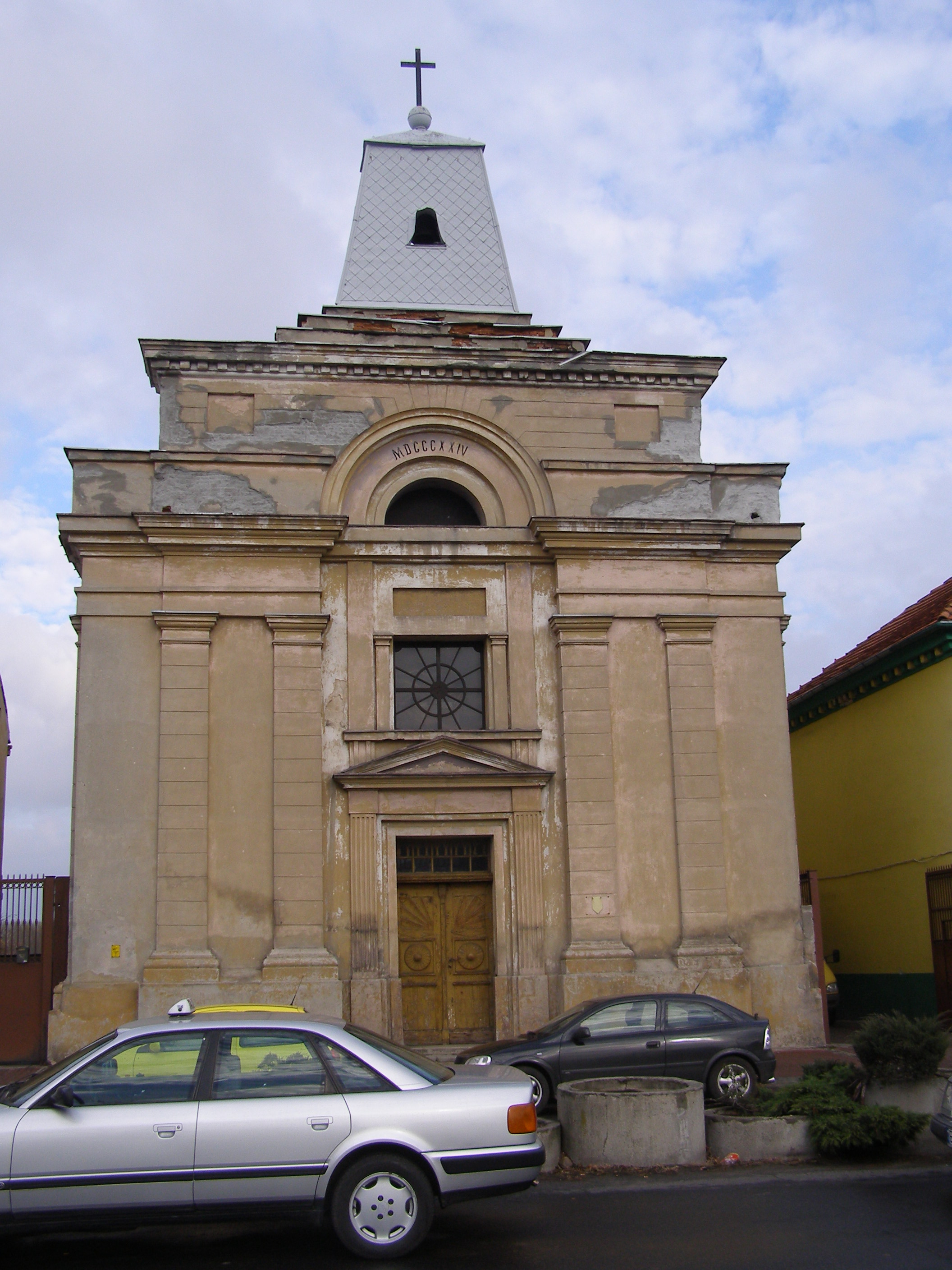
The church in Tomaszów where Iohann Benni served as pastor

Up until then ignorant of the native ways, Benni was instantly appalled by them. "Common with those boys were lies, deceit and dirty talk which in my father's home was unheard of. What was totally unacceptable to me, though, was the contemptuous way they treated people of lower classes and their own servants, while in our house servants were treated in the mildest possible manner," Benni remembered, according to his friend, writer Nikolai Leskov. Still without any books to aid, he came to the conclusion that at the root of all the injustice in the world around him was the economic and political system. He became friends with some Russian soldiers (simply in defiance of his Polish classmates, who hated them), learned from them of primal ways of collective ownership (obschina, artel) and principles of mutual responsibility which existed in their country and, having formed in his mind his own, an idealistic concept of Russia, decided that was the land where his Socialist ideas could be put into practice.

After leaving school Benni went to England to enroll at the technical college and, upon the graduation, joined the Woolwich arsenal as an engineer. By this time, in 1858 he became close to the circle of Russians in exile, led by Hertzen, Bakunin and Ogaryov. Full of idealistic aspirations, Benni received the English passport and volunteered to go to Russia to investigate the revolutionary situation there (which was quite ripe, as his new friends were assuring him) and distribute Hertzen's Kolokol's latest issue he were to smuggle there. The self-proclaimed revolutionaries' sympathiser, a Russian merchant named Tomashewski who happened to be in London, agreed to accompany the 22-year-old Benni on his mission. In Berlin Tomashewski declared that their ways from then on were to part, or either he'd report him to the police. Unthwarted, Benni, a load of Kolokol with him, found himself in Saint Petersburg in the summer of 1861, still eager to "serve the great cause of Russian liberation."

=== Benni in Russia ===
In the Russian capital Benni was befriended by a group of radicals (Nikolai Kurochkin, Pavel Yakushkin, Andrei Nichiporenko and others) who started referring to him as 'a Hertzen's envoy' (something Benni had never claimed to be) and instilling into him the idea that "everything was ready in Russia for a revolt." Unimpressed, Benni demanded a demonstration of "the revolutionary forces," but only five people came up, some by foot "others by cabs so as to make retreat easier, just in case," as Leskov put it. Disillusioned with the 'revolutionary situation' in Saint Petersburgh, Benni with Nichiporenko, the Kolokol edition with them, embarked upon a trip to the province. Due to the latter's obnoxiousness, though, the pair has been thrown out of every house they tried to stay in, following their recommendation list. Finally, the two fell afoul of the local Cossacks and, after visiting the police, burnt their stack of Kolokol. As Benni was trying to leave his troublesome companion behind, the latter retaliated: he returned to Saint Petersburg with the theory of Benni being an "English spy," backing his allegations by the stories of his "suspicious behaviour" which involved, among other things, refusing to participate in drunken sprees and sex orgies, and defending the local "reactionaries" whom Nechiporenko has made a habit of insulting in their own homes. The idea was eagerly accepted by the Petersburg "revolutionaries", now embarrassed and frightened by Benni's eagerness. Another project of Arthur Benni, that of collecting signatures under the Constitutional petition, addressed to the Tsar, failed too.

Meanwhile, Nichiporenko came to England, met Hertzen there and made a good enough impression to be employed by the latter as another 'envoy'. Burdened with a stack of Kolokol' new issue, he was stopped at the Russian border, was arrested and taken to the Russian capital for interrogation where he eagerly reported on every person he knew, including Benni and Leskov, as well as the others whom he had never met, like Ivan Turgenev. By this time Benni become a member of Severnaya Ptchela, a respectable newspaper where for the first time in Russia he found himself among people who treated him with respect and sympathy.

For some reason the women's liberation movement activists in Russia preferred to involve their protégés in printing business which naturally made authorities, who were hunting the proclamations distributors, suspicious. "There were few honest men in the capital who sincerely wanted to provide women with jobs at the time, and Benni was one of them," Leskov wrote. What the latter did first was to bring a group of women translators to the Severnaya ptchela editorial office, then took them to the Grech house in Saint Petersburgh, where they became known as The Grech commune. This enterprise proved inefficient: Bennihad to do all the work himself and paid his employees from his own pocket.

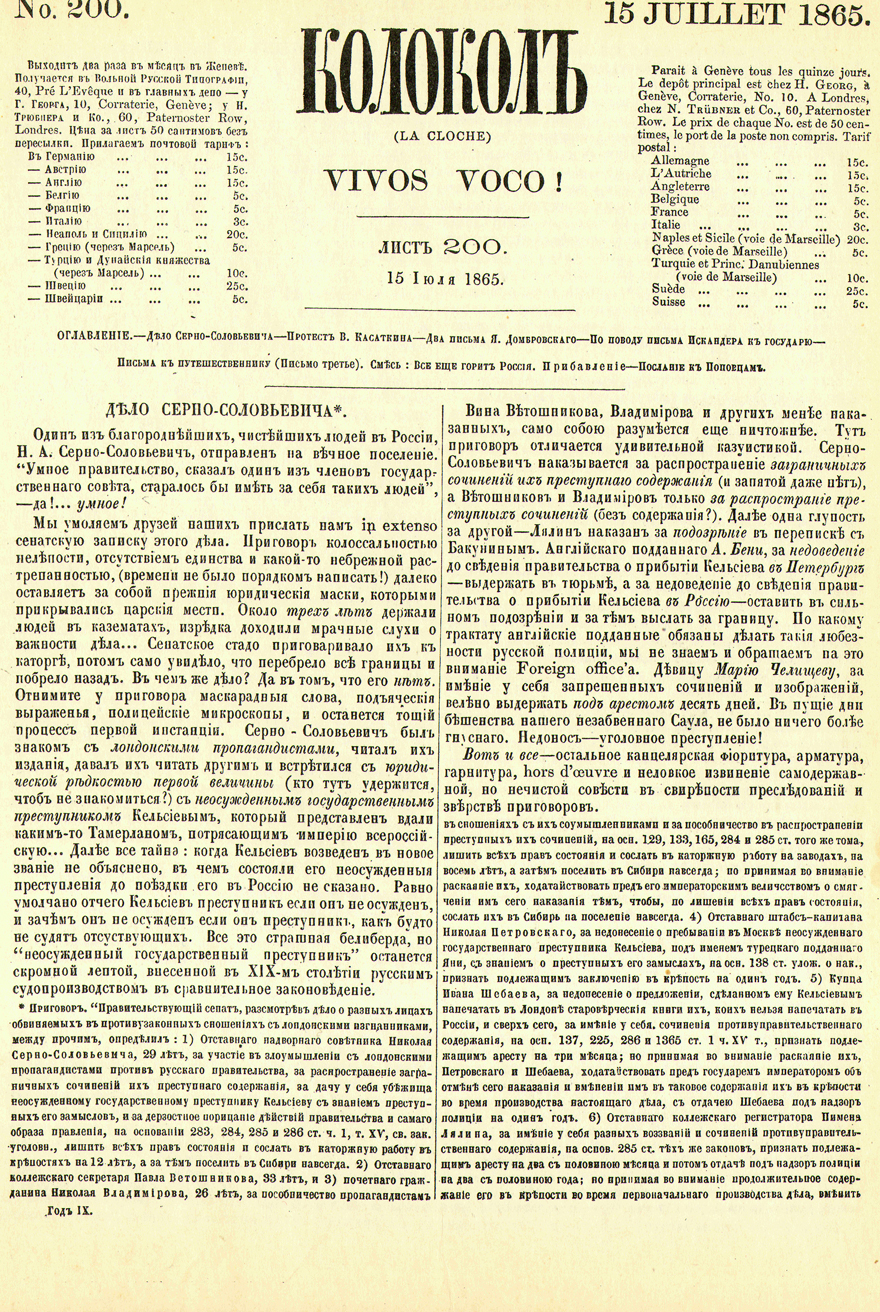
Hertzen making a plea for the British Foreign Office to help Benni, in his Kolokol newspaper

As the commune disintegrated, Benni brought the four type-setting machines into the house and invited four more female communards in. "This enterprise was doomed, like all of the others he's been involved in, for Benni, whom simple men thought to be 'a scheming type', was, in fact, naïve as a child. This tragicomic 'naturalized English subject' who came to Russia with the view of making social-democratic revolution… has demonstrated such inability to organize other people as to quickly turn this new business of his into a joke," Leskov commented. The commune proved a disaster. What was worse, by this time a bunch of male 'communards' have made his flat their home, spending the host's money, stealing his clothes and even driving him off, from time to time. Benni became seriously ill as a result of spending two sleepless nights in the open air on the banks of Neva embankment after a woman, thrown out of her home by husband, came to his flat and settled in his bedroom.

Meanwhile, another literary man, Vasily Sleptsov, created the Znamensky commune. One of the workers there was Maria Kopteva, a girl from a respectable Moscow family, and Benni fell in love with her. Starting to look for a real job, Benni realised what his reputation of a "spy" meant in reality: none of the "progressive" press wanted him. Warmer was the reception in the centrist magazines, Dostoyevsky's Epokha and Biblioteka Dlya Chtenya, led by Pyotr Boborykin, who started to employ him as a stuff translator. In both magazines Benni was treated with sympathy and forged friendships – notably, with Nikolai Strakhov and Nikolai Voskoboinikov. In March 1862 Benni participated in the publication of the two issues of illegal Russkaya Pravda newspaper. Charles Dickens's Our Mutual Friend novel was published in 1864 by Boborykin in Arthur Benni's translation. By this time though, according to Leskov, "he was a wasted, disillusioned man, taken to apathy… Even his love for a Russian girl failed to bring him happiness, in fact, it seemed to make him even more lost and misguided, his whole persona seemingly disintegrating under the emotional stress."

Starting to neglect his professional obligations, Benni soon lost his money and possessions, then became homeless. "He was talking nonsensical things in those days, making plans to go to Siberia and free Chernyshevsky, cried and prayed a lot," remembered Leskov, who's given him shelter. In the spring of 1863 Benni was arrested for debts in Leskov's Kolomna home and sent to a single cell in the Spassky jail. Pastor Hermann Benni sent in the money to pay his brother's debts, but by the time they came in, Benni has been considered already a political prisoner. Now part of the so-called 32 Process, or "The Case of people accused of contacts with the London propagandists," he was accused of helping another Herzen's associate, Vasily Kelsiyev, who came to Russia illegally and in March 1862 stayed at Benni's place (the fact Nichiporenko has reported to the authorities).

The Russian Senate sentenced him to three months imprisonment and deportation which was a mild sentence. Benni applied for the Russian citizenship but was refused. In jail he spent his time reading a lot, and reportedly, once confessed: "Would you imagine, it is only now, as they are throwing me out of Russia, that I can see how ignorant I was… All my misfortunes here stem from the fact that I've failed to read Dead Souls in time. Had I done it, I'd be the first to dispute Herzen's idea of making revolution in Russia". Asked why, he replied: "Because no one can hope to instill any of the noble principles into the likes of Nozdryov and Tchichikov, ever."

In October 1865 Benni was deported to Prussia and settled in Switzerland. It was there that he officially married Maria, the girl he was in love with. One article, "The Russian Society" which he published in The Fortnightly Review (1866, book III), showed that "was still under the impression the revolution in Russia would be not only possible, but desirable," according to Leskov.

=== Death ===
In the end of 1867 a small note appeared in Illustrirovannaya Gazeta, edited by Vladimir Zotov, according to which "Arthur Benni, of whom different contradictory, mostly unfavourable rumors were being spread, has been killed in Menton." This story, short as it was, provided ground for a new rumour, that of Benni having been killed by a Garibaldi man, as a Russian spy. "And the same industrious people, who could have been blamed for poor Benni's initial troubles, all of a sudden with unheard of energy started to support this new slander," Nikolai Leskov wrote in The Mystery Man.

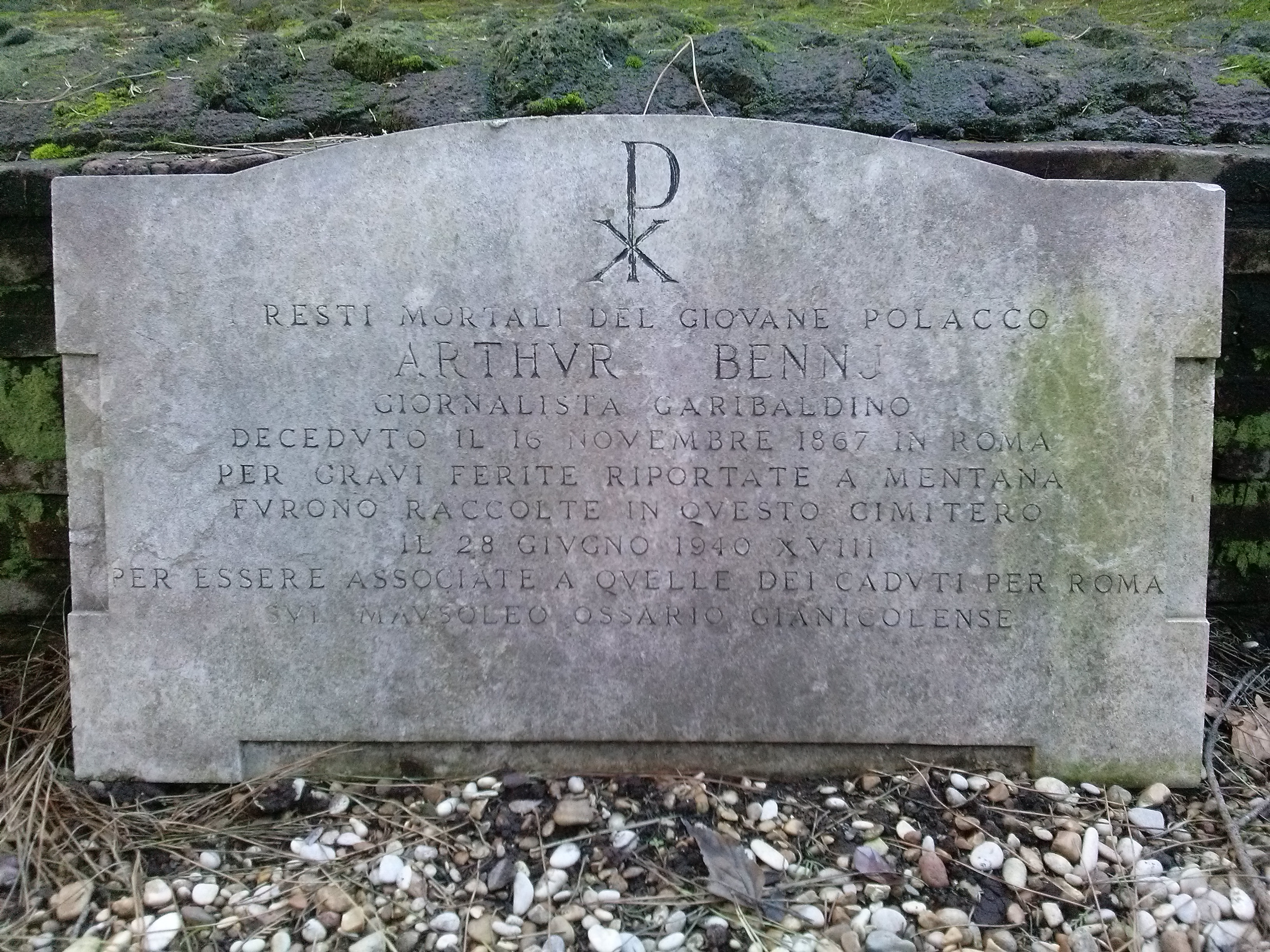
Arthur Benni's grave-board in the Non-Catholic Cemetery in Rome

In June 1870, Nedelya (in Nos. 21–23) published the notes of Alexandra Jacobi, who spent several months with Garibaldi men and was beside Benni all through November 1867. By the time of the Battle at Mentana, Benni has arrived to the Garibaldi camp, as a Fortnightly Review correspondent. According to Jacobi, as the 9th regiment commander had been killed, Garibaldi's son Menotti asked Benni to take the leadership upon himself. He did, was injured in the right hand and on 4 November found himself in the Sant'Onofrio hospital in Rome, in the most awful conditions. Alexandra Jacobi, assisted by an English priest, managed to transfer him to Sant'Agata hospital where conditions were better. What appeared to be a slight wound led to the amputation of the right hand, but even this proved to be too late. On 27 December (16 November or 27 November, according to other sources) Arthur Benni died in Rome, from complications of ergotism (according to other sources, gangrene). Two days later he was buried at the Protestant Cemetery, Rome (now Non-Catholic Cemetery), his grave "full of white and red flowers with green leaves, symbolizing Italy's colours", according to Alexandra Jacobi.

== Bibliography ==
- Eduard Kneifel, Tomaschower Pastorensohn – ein Revolutionär! (Arthur Benni 1840–1867), "Weg und Ziel. Mitteilungsblatt des Hilfskomitees der evang.-luth. Deutschen aus Polen" 1960, No. 3, pp. 3–4.
- Hugh McLean, Leskov and his Enigmatic Man. "Harvard Slavic Studies" 4, 1957, pp. 203–224.
- Nicholas Stanley-Price, The Risorgimento and burial in the cemetery, "Friends of the Non-Catholic Cemetery in Rome. Newsletter" No. 16, Autumn 2011, p. 1.
- Nicholas Stanley-Price, The Non-Catholic Cemetery in Rome. Its history, its people and its survival for 300 years, ISBN 978-88-909168-0-9, Rome 2014, p. 140.
- Richard Stites, The Women's Liberation Movement in Russia: Feminism, Nihilsm, and Bolshevism, 1860–1930, ISBN 9780691100586, Princeton (N.J.): Princeton University Press 1974, pp. 108–109.
- Krzysztof Tomasz Witczak, Benni Artur Wilhelm (1839–1867), Tomaszowski Słownik Biograficzny, fasc. 6, Tomaszów Mazowiecki 2010, pp. 5–7 (biographical note).
