= Alexandra Jacobi =

Russian writer (1841–1916)

Aleksandra Jacobi
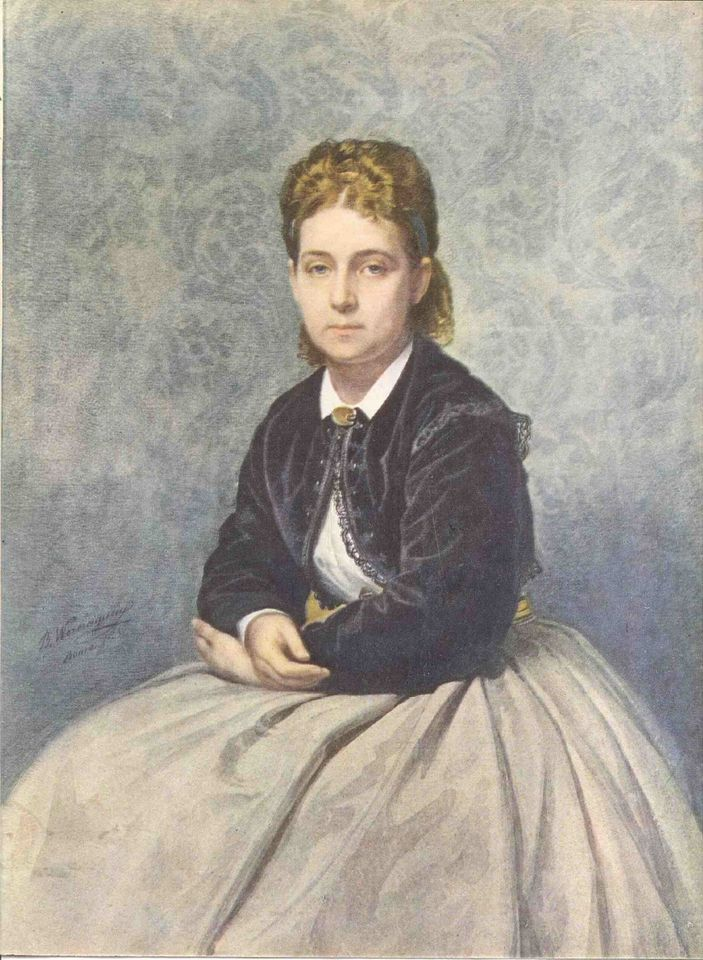
- 1867 portrait by Vasily Vereshchagin
- Born: Aleksandra Nikolayevna Susokolova; Александра Николаевна Сусоколова; 6 May 1841; Yegoryevsk, Ryazan Governorate, Imperial Russia
- Died: 1 December 1918 (aged 77); Petrograd, Soviet Russia
- Occupations: journalist, translator, memoirist, editor, publisher
- Spouse(s): Vasily Tyufyayev; Valery Jacobi; Dmitry Peshkov

Aleksandra Nikolayevna Susokolova (Russian: Александра Николаевна Сусоколова, 6 May 1841 - 1 December 1918), better known as Aleksandra Jacobi (Russian: Александра Якоби), was a Russian journalist, memoirist and publicist, translator and publisher who also used the pseudonym Toliverova and (after her third marriage) signed her work as Peshkova-Toliverova. Her portraits have been painted by her common-law husband Valery Jacobi, as well as Vasily Vereshchagin.

== Biography ==
Aleksandra Jacobi was born in Yegoryevsk, Ryazan Governorate, to a merchant family of Nikolai Ivanovich Susokolov and his wife Anna Ivanovna. Soon the family moved to Kazan where she attended the Jungwald boarding school for girls and later the city gymnasium. After her first marriage to Vasily Tyufyayev (a teacher at the Kazan institute for the Daughters of nobility) broke down, she moved to Saint Petersburg and in 1860 became close to a local circle of the Kazan community. She became romantically involved with Valery Jacobi, later a renowned painter, and for the next decade remained his common-law wife. Their marriage has never been registered, but she adopted Jacobi as her pen name and continued to use it long after the two parted.

Aleksandra Jacobi became and active member of the proto-Socialist 1860s movement in Russia and as one of this country's first feminists. In 1866, along with her husband she came to Italy and settled in Rome. A year later, she joined the Garibaldi forces as a sister of mercy and worked for a while as a Russian correspondent for Golos, reporting from the frontlines. Arthur Benni, whom she attended to in hospital during the last days of his life, died in December 1867, apparently in her arms. Several colourful biographies dealt with her seemingly extraordinary adventures in Italy, but later it transpired (from her own diaries and notes) that much of Jacobi's life of that period has been heavily romanticised and to some extent mythologised.

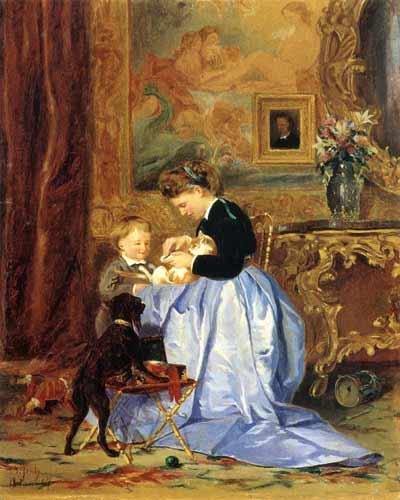
The Family of an Artist, the 1867 painting by Valery Jacobi, with Alexandra and their son Vladimir modelling

Upon her return from Italy Jacobi continued a successful career in journalism and became a regular contributor to Molva, Birzhevye Vedomosti, Nedelya and Novoye Vremya. She wrote memoirs on Garibaldi (as well as Franz Liszt and Fyodor Dostoyevsky among many others), translated numerous George Sand's fairytales into Russian and was the first translator of the poetry by Mikhail Lermontov and Nikolai Nekrasov into Italian.

Jacobi was best known in Russia as a publisher and editor of the children's magazine Igrushechka (Игрушечка, Little Toy, 1887–1910) which attracted a host of celebrities, among them Lev Tolstoy and Mamin-Sibiryak, as well as Nikolai Leskov, with whom Jacobi corresponded for many years. Although an active contributor, Leskov left some scathing remarks (albeit in private correspondence only) concerning this publication, once calling it "...stale old-fashion garbage, proved to be totally irrelevant... and full of hypocrisy." Maxim Gorky and Kornei Chukovsky were also among the detractors, but Anatoly Kony, a renowned Russian lawyer of the time, praised Igrushechka for good language, high-quality translations and brilliant biographical pieces (on Alfred Tennison, Robert Fulton, George Stephenson, James Watt, Carl Linnaeus and Niccolò Paganini among many others), praising it for being a fine source of knowledge for the young readership, filled with the spirit of love, humanism and enlightenment.

Jacobi edited three more publications, Na Pomoshch Materyam (На помощь матерям, Helping Mothers, 1894–1904), Zhenskoye Delo (Женское дело, Women's Cause, 1899–1900) and Krasnye Zori (Красные зори, Red Sunrise, 1911–1912). She died from the complications of pneumonia on 1 December 1918 in Petrograd, Soviet Russia, and was interred in the Nikolskoe Cemetery at Alexander Nevsky Lavra.
