= Jeff Jacoby =

Jeff Jacoby may refer to:

- Jeff Jacoby (columnist) (born 1959), American journalist
- Jeff Jacoby (sound artist) (contemporary), American sound and radio artist
