= Jakobi (surname) =

Jakobi is a surname and may refer to:

- Allan Jakobi of Apelsin, an Estonian band created in 1974 by Tõnu Aare
- Paula O. Jakobi (1870–1960), American suffragist and playwright
- Robert Jakobi (born 1985), Food entrepreneur
- Viktor Jakobi (1883–1921), Hungarian operetta composer

== See also ==
- German destroyer Z5 Paul Jakobi, Type 1934A-class destroyer built for Nazi Germany's Kriegsmarine in the mid-1930s
- Jacobi (surname)
- Jakob (disambiguation)
- Jakobid
