= Jacobi =

Jacobi may refer to:

== People ==
- Jacobi (surname), a list of people with the surname
- Jacobi Boykins (born 1995), American basketball player
- Jacobi Francis (born 1998), American football player
- Jacobi Mitchell (born 1986), Bahamian sprinter
- Jacobi Robinson (born 1984), Bermudian cricketer

== In mathematics ==
Concepts named after the German mathematician Carl Gustav Jacob Jacobi:

- Jacobi sum, a type of character sum
- Jacobi method, a method for determining the solutions of a diagonally dominant system of linear equations
- Jacobi eigenvalue algorithm, a method for calculating the eigenvalues and eigenvectors of a real symmetric matrix
- Jacobi elliptic functions, a set of doubly-periodic functions
- Jacobian matrix and determinant of a smooth map between Euclidean spaces or smooth manifolds
- Jacobi operator (Jacobi matrix), a tridiagonal symmetric matrix appearing in the theory of orthogonal polynomials
- Jacobi polynomials, a class of orthogonal polynomials
- Jacobi symbol, a generalization of the Legendre symbol
- Jacobi coordinates, a simplification of coordinates for an n-body system
- Jacobi identity for non-associative binary operations
- Jacobi's formula for the derivative of the determinant of a matrix
- Jacobi triple product, an identity in the theory of theta functions
- Jacobi's theorem (disambiguation), several theorems

== Other uses ==
- Jacobi Medical Center, New York
- Jacobi (grape), another name for the French/German wine grape Pinot Noir Précoce
- Jacobi (crater), a lunar impact crater in the southern highlands on the near side of the Moon
- Software for handling chess problems § Jacobi, chess software

== See also ==
- Jacoby (disambiguation)
- Jacob
- Jakob (disambiguation)
- Jacobs (disambiguation)
- Jacobian (disambiguation)
- Jacobin (disambiguation)
- Jacobite (disambiguation)
