= Herman Sachnowitz =

Herman Sachnowitz (born 13 June 1921 in Larvik, - 5 March 1978 in Oslo) was a Norwegian merchant. He was one of the few Norwegian Jews who survived deportation to a concentration camp.

He was son of Israel Leib Sachnowitz (born 31 March 1880 in Russia, died 1 December 1942 in Auschwitz, Nazi German-occupied Poland) and Sara Sachnowitz (born 15 June 1882 in Riga, died 16 October 1939 in Larvik, Norway).

Sachnowitz was one of 772 Norwegian Jews to be deported to Auschwitz. He was arrested together with other men in the family on 26 October 1942. Sheriff Gran in Stokke arrested them and sent them to Berg concentration camp. The deportation to Germany happened on the German transport ship Donau in November 1942. Only 34 of the deported Jews survived the stay in Auschwitz and the other concentration camps. Sachnowitz attended the death march from the camp in Buna on 18 January 1945, and they walked 80 km the first day. He estimated that his group consisted of up to 100,000 prisoners, most of whom died under the march. From Gliwice they were sent with train which went all over the present-day Czech republic and Austria and finally arrived in the camp at Dora at Nordhausen after approximately 10 days. The prisoners at Dora and Buchenwald worked in underground factories with building V-1 flying bombs and V-2 rockets. Sachnowitz was a witness of the many bodies, which each only weighed 35–40 kg, which were burnt outside the camp in huge fires or sent to the crematorium at Buchenwald. At the end of the war, Sachnowitz and his comrades were sent by foot From Dora to Bergen-Belsen. When British forces attended Bergen-Belsen,, Sachnowitz was the only surviving Norwegian there. On 28 April 1945, he and other sick prisoners were evacuated to a hospital in Eindhoven. From there he was sent to a hospital in Copenhagen, Denmark for proper treatment.

Sachnowitz lost his father, three sisters and four brothers in Auschwitz (his mother died in 1939). Sachnowitz told about his stay as a Jewish slave in Auschwitz in the book Det angår også deg (It concerns you too), co-written by Arnold Jacoby. After the war, Sachnowitz married Paula Sachnowitz. His late brother Elias had opened a ladies' clothing store "Ekko" (Prinsegata 8) in Larvik in 1935, that Herman now took over.

== Sources ==
- Sachnowitz, Herman and Arnold Jacoby (1976). Det angår også deg. Oslo: Cappelen. ISBN 8252505449.
