= Heinrich Otto Jacobi =

German classical philologist

- Born: July 28, 1815; Tütz, West Prussia
- Died: September 16, 1864 (aged 49); Berlin, German Confederation

Academic background
- Education: Berlin University

Academic work
- Discipline: Classical philology

Heinrich Otto Jacobi (July 28, 1815 – September 16, 1864) was a German classical philologist.

== Biography ==
Heinrich Otto Jacobi was born to a Jewish family in Tütz, West Prussia. He studied at University of Berlin, where, under the influence of Bellermann, Droysen and Pape, he devoted himself to philology. He also attended lectures in philosophy, history, German studies, mathematics, and natural sciences. He received a doctorate honoris causa from the University of Königsberg in March 1854 for his profound knowledge of the Greek language.

Jacobi was engaged as teacher at the Joachimsthal Gymnasium, Berlin, from 1854 till 1858, and then became teacher at the Friedrich Wilhelm Gymnasium at Posen, where in the spring of 1860 he received the title of professor.

Jacobi was the compiler of the Index Græcitatis to Meineke's edition of Græcorum Comicorum Fragmenta (Berlin, 1847). Of his other works may be mentioned In Comicos Græcos Adnotationum Corollarium (Berlin, 1866).
