= Pavel Jacobiy =

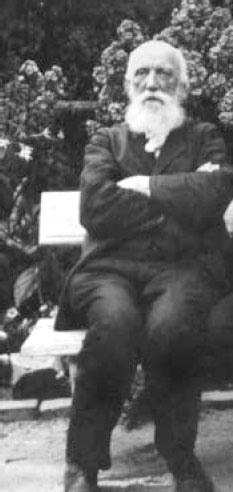
Pavel Jacobiy in old age

Pavel Ivanovich Jacobiy (Russian: Павел Иванович Якобий or Якоби; 15 July [O.S. 3 July] 1841, Kazan - 24 March [O.S. 11 March] 1913) was a Russian revolutionary socialist, member of the Land and Liberty society, ethnographer and physician. He was a pioneer of the Pinel reforms of psychiatry in Russia, credited to be first who formulated all the principles for the new paradigm in the organizational psychiatry.

Pavel Jacobiy was a born to a noble family of retired colonel Ivan Karlovich Jacobiy. He was a younger brother of painter Valery Jacobi. Pavel Jacobi graduated from Mikhailovskaya Artillery Military School in 1860 and continued his education in Mikhailovskaya Artillery Military Academy. Soon he became a member of the socialist Circle of Artillerists-Chernyshevs that included such future prominent revolutionaries as Peter Kropotkin and Pyotr Lavrov. Jacobi retired from the Army and studied at the University of Heidelberg.

In 1863-1864 he participated in the January Uprising in Poland planning to organize Russian Republican Legion fighting for the freedom of Poland from the Russian Empire. He was heavily wounded in the Battle at Kruszyna on 30 August 1863. After recovering he was the Chief of Staff of Insurgent formations in Galicia. After suppressing of the uprising Jacobi emigrated to Switzerland.

In 1864 Jacobiy enters and in 1868 graduated from the Medical Department of the University of Zurich. He became a leader of the "Young Emigration" circle of the Land and Liberty society and published polemical political articles criticizing socialist Alexander Herzen for being to moderate. He also tried to introduce theories of Karl Marx into the field of forensic medicine. In Switzerland he married Varvara Alexandrovna Zaytseva, sister of Russian publicist Varfolomey Zaytsev (1842–1882).

In 1871 during the Franco-Prussian War Jacobi served as a military doctor in the Army of the Vosges led by Giuseppe Garibaldi. His wife, Zaytseva-Jacobi also served in the Army of the Vosges as a medical nurse and later left popular memoirs Among Garibaldians. Memoirs of a Russian Woman.

In 1880 Jacobiy writes an important article Morality in Psychiatric Statistics (Нравственность в психиатрической статистике). The statistical calculations for the article were performed by Russian mathematician Sofia Kovalevskaya. The work was later become the basis of Cesare Lombroso's monograph L'uomo di genio in rapporto alla psichiatria (Man of Genius)

In 1890 Jacobiy returned to Russia, where he worked as a psychiatrist in Moscow, Orel and other locations, as well as conducting ethnographic research. He was one of the people that made possible transformation of psychiatric institutions from the places for isolation of mad people into the medical clinics primary concerned with the treatment of their patients. Jacobiy organized the psychiatric clinic in Kishkinka, Orel (now Orel Regional Psychiatric Hospital) and the psychiatric clinic in Pokrovskoye-Mescherskoye near Moscow (now Moscow Regional Psychiatric Hospital N2) that were exemplary for their times. He also participated in establishing psychiatric institutions in Kharkov, Kursk and Mogilev. Jacobi is credited as the first who formulated all the principles for the new paradigm in the organizational psychiatry towards Pinel ideas of non-confinement. It was done during a historical debate of 1891 about the future of Russian psychiatry and required expertise in both European new theories and psychiatric practice in contemporary Russia.

One of the main ethnographic results of Jacobi at the time was discovering people of clearly Finnic descent, whom he attributed to be descendants of historical Vyatichs tribe.

Pavel Jacobi died in Saint Petersburg in 1913. His son, Ivan Palvovich Jacobiy was a notable political thinker of White Emigre, the author of the book Nicholas II and the Revolution (Tallinn, 1937).

== Major works ==
- Проект организации земского попечения о душевнобольных Московской губернии, ч. 1–2, М., 1891–92; (Project of organization zemstvo care of mental patients of Moscow Gubernia, in two volumes, 1891–1892)
- Основы административной психиатрии, Орел, 1900; (Basics of Administrative Psychiatry), 1900 )
- Глухонемые, СПБ, 1907; (Deaf and Dumb, 1907)
- Вятичи Орловской губернии, СПБ, 1907 {Vyatichs of Orel Gubernia, 1907)
