= Jacoby =

Jacoby may refer to:

- Jacoby (given name)
- Jacoby (surname)
- Jacoby Glacier, a glacier in Antarctica
- Jacoby transfer, a convention used in the card game contract bridge
- Jacoby (typeface), a font from Monotype that was used for various Cartoon Network promos and bumpers during the Powerhouse era, as well as the Playhouse Disney logo
- Fragmente der griechischen Historiker, a collection of Ancient Greek histories by Felix Jacoby, sometimes cited as "Jacoby"

== See also ==
- Jacobi (disambiguation)
