= Jeff Jacoby (sound artist) =

Jeff Jacoby is an American sound and radio artist. He also serves as Professor of Media Arts in the Department of Broadcast and Electronic Communication Arts at San Francisco State University.

== Career ==
Jacoby's deep involvement in radio and sound production began in the early 1970s during his college years. In 1973, while at Franconia College in New Hampshire, Jeff hosted a radio program entitled Morning Mania, where he experimented with sound manipulation techniques using available analog equipment. This marked his initial foray into creative audio work, relying on manual processes such as tape splicing and turntable manipulations to generate effects in an era dominated by tape recorders with limited multichannel capabilities. By the mid-1970s, Jacoby was collaborating on up to five shows weekly at KAOS, FM at The Evergreen State College, and KBOO, a community radio station in Portland, Oregon. These efforts involved hands-on production, including the use of early synthesizers such as the Buchla and ARP 2600 systems, which required physical patching, and necessitated innovative problem-solving over reliance on institutional norms. During this period, he also co-developed The Traveling Radio Show, a collaborative project blending experimental audio collage, radio theater, satire, and music with mobile production between Olympia, WA., and Portland, OR. In 1979, after relocating to Connecticut, Jacoby continued doing community radio at WLNV in Derby, CT. He formalized his freelance activities by founding Living Sound Productions in 1980, a company specializing in radio, sound design, video, and other media production. Jacoby also spent two years in Shelburne Falls, MA, where he started and operated the Bucklandside Café. The café became a hub for touring acoustic musicians traveling through the area. Jacoby produced highly successful shows with legendary New England artists such as Gordon Bok and David Mallett. Recordings from some of those live sets were famously captured on cassette tape by Jacoby himself. All of these endeavors established his foundation in the media arts, emphasizing self-reliant innovation, production management, and creative exploration.

Notable Works and Projects

Jacoby's radio program, The Traveling Radio Show, originated in the 1970s, continued with episodes in the late 1990s as an ongoing WNPR series that blended live performance, sound art, and site-specific explorations. Recent episodes of the program, such as The Traveling Radio Show Goes to the CSU! and other radio tours of great American cities, including New York, Washington D.C., Philadelphia, Boston, New Orleans, and San Francisco, illustrate its format of improvised audio narratives and sonic experimentation. Parallel to his radio endeavors, Jacoby developed Sonic Dark Rides, a series of sound art installations and performances initiated in the 2000s, focusing on creating immersive audio environments. These projects have been featured in galleries and festivals, such as South by Southwest and Black Maria Festival. In recent years, Jacoby has extended his practice through digital platforms, releasing compositions on Bandcamp, Soundcloud, and his own website (jeffjacoby.net) that merge archival radio material with contemporary sound design, such as emphasizing activist-oriented video/sound hybrids. Interdisciplinary collaborations, many with visual artists for multimedia pieces, underscore a shift toward hybrid forms blending sound with performance.

Sound Design and Collaborations

Jacoby's sound design work extends to collaborative art and media projects, particularly documentaries and short films, where his audio work supported historical and activist narratives. For the 2001 TV movie African Americans in Connecticut: From Civil War to Civil Rights, Jacoby served as sound designer, integrating layered ambient recordings and effects to underscore the documentary's chronological portrayal of African American history. This project exemplified his role in enhancing factual storytelling through soundscapes that grounded abstract historical events in audible realism, and his work was recognized with an Emmy Award and other honors. In other works, Jacoby collaborated on activist-oriented videos, such as The Amistad Revolt: All We Want Is Make Us Free (1995), where he handled sound design to amplify the retelling of the 1839 slave ship rebellion, using foley and archival audio integrations to heighten dramatic tension and viewer immersion. Similarly, for the short film Electronic Road Film: An American Odyssey (1996), his sound design incorporated road-trip field recordings and synthesized elements to evoke a sense of transcontinental exploration. More recent collaborations include sound editing and mixing for shorts such as Fire and Spirit (2014) and Off-Line (2009), and Rock, Paper, Paint (2024) focusing on audio mixes that support thematic explorations of environment and activism. Jeff also produced and was a commissioned artist for large-scale, collaborative art installations, often with his wife Sharon Steuer, who is a celebrated artist and activist. These applied designs, often in tandem with visual artists and performers, underscore his interest in artistic expression, activism, and narrative storytelling.

Artistic Approach

Jacoby's approaches to sound art center on compositional and improvisational techniques, as demonstrated in his ongoing series Sonic Dark Rides, which involves creating and performing sonic works on stage and live radio to explore spatial and auditory dimensions. This method prioritizes direct engagement with acoustic environments through live execution, drawing on over four decades of experience in audio production to achieve perceptual depth without reliance on abstract experimentation. In radio art, Jacoby emphasizes narrative structures that document real-world locales and human experiences, evident in The Traveling Radio Show, originally produced in the 1970s and ongoing, that integrates field recordings, interviews, and layered audio to convey authentic spatial and social realities. His production process incorporates directing, writing, and performing to ensure causal fidelity in sound representation, favoring empirical capture of ambient and voiced elements over stylized abstraction to maintain listener accessibility and verisimilitude. Jacoby's technical methodology bridges analog origins—rooted in 1970s radio practices—with contemporary digital tools, including workstations for editing and synthesis, enabling precise manipulation of sound. This evolution supports his preference for grounded, evidence-based layering that mirrors perceptual realism, as opposed to trends prioritizing novelty at the expense of communicative clarity.

Empirical Foundations & Innovations

Jacoby's sound art innovations center on the integration of site-specific field recordings into immersive installations and performances, as exemplified by his ongoing "Into Sonic Space" series, initiated in the 2010s. This project employs multi-channel audio compositions derived from environmental sounds of particular locations or themes, fostering spatial awareness and listener immersion through layered, non-linear playback. Such techniques advance radio-derived sound art by extending it beyond linear broadcasting into interactive, spatially distributed formats, tested through gallery exhibitions and public installations nationwide. Complementing this, The Traveling Radio Show, originally produced in the 1970s and ongoing, innovates by embedding live, on-location audio capture and narrative structuring to reveal communities and places in real time. Episodes, such as recent visits to CSU campuses including San Francisco State University, utilize portable recording rigs and post-production layering to blend ambient, interview, and performative elements, yielding portable sonic portraits, broadcast on platforms such as NPR affiliates. These foundations draw from Jacoby's near six-decade career in production, prioritizing verifiable acoustic data from direct environmental sampling over purely synthetic generation or musical modeling. Current projects include Sonic Dark Rides (immersive sound art experiences), Professor Noize podcasts, The Traveling Radio Show, and collaborations with artists working in a variety of mediums.

== Honors and awards ==
Jeff received an Emmy Award (2001) and two Emmy nominations for his contributions in sound design. He has received two Crystal Radio Awards from the National Association of Broadcasters, recognizing commitment to community service in broadcast media. He’s earned two Benjamin Franklin Awards, which honored his outstanding audio production in publishing. In the Broadcast Education Association competitions, Jacoby has seven awards for audio and radio projects, including two Best of Festival honors (2014 & 2026), the top international award for media production within the Academy. Additionally, he has received two Ciné Golden Eagle Awards, a distinction for outstanding achievements in film, video, and television. His sound art and radio works have been selected for screening at international festivals including South by Southwest, Black Maria Film and Video Festival, Festival du Cinéma de Paris, and ASIFA East. These selections underscore peer recognition for excellence within the professional and academic communities.
