= Pavel Yakushkin =

Pavel Ivanovich Yakushkin
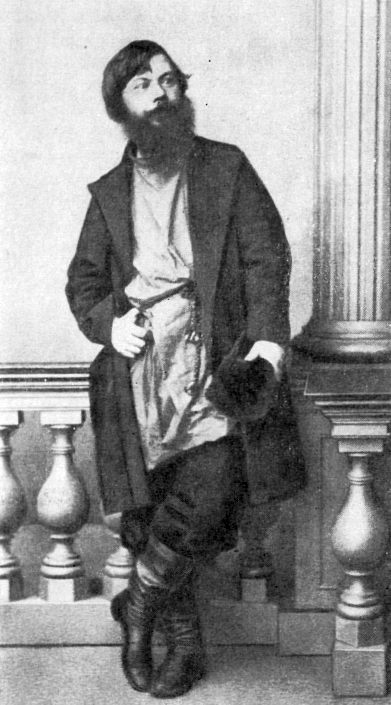
- Pavel Yakushkin in the 1850s
- Born: Павел Иванович Якушкин; January 26, 1822; Oryol Governorate, Russian Empire
- Died: January 20, 1872 (aged 49); Samara, Russian Empire
- Occupations: author, ethnographist, folklorist
- Years active: 1840s-1872

Pavel Ivanovich Yakushkin (Павел Иванович Якушкин; 26 January 1822, in Oryol Governorate, Russian Empire – 20 January 1872, in Samara, Russian Empire) was a Russian writer, ethnographer and folklore collector.

== Biography ==
Pavel Yakushkin was born at the Saburovo estate in the Maloarchangelsky region of the Oryol Governorate, one of the six sons of Ivan Andreyevich Yakushkin, a retired military man, and his wife Praskovya Faleyevna, a former serf peasant who'd been granted freedom.

After finishing the Oryol gymnasium, he enrolled into the Moscow University's physics and mathematics faculty but dropped after four years of studying due to sudden passion for gathering folk songs. In this he was much encouraged by his mentor Pyotr Kireyevsky who began commissioning the young man for long journeys into the Russian backwoods province. Yakushkin who started out as a travelling salesman, exchanging goods for songs, relied upon this unorthodox method of the ethnographical study for the rest of his life.

Erratic behaviour aggravated by alcoholism (the side effect of another ploy for 'extracting' a song from a country man, that of buying them a drink) and carefree mindset involved Yakushkin in all kinds of trouble (including a couple of arrests and imprisonment for alleged 'agitation') and made him a legend in his own time. The way he looked (disheveled hair, strange costume mixing rural and urban elements, spectacles included) helped too: the series of Yakushkin's photo portraits produced by Berestov were selling well in the rural areas where people seriously believed them to be the authentic snapshots of the 18th-century rebel Yemelyan Pugachov.

In 1871 Pavel Yakushkin caught the Relapsing fever and died in Samara on January 20, 1872. Author and doctor Veniamin Portugalov, who visited him in hospital, remembered that the dying man's last words were those of his favourite folk song which he was singing as he was passing away: "Drinking we'll do, partying we'll do / And when the death comes in, then dying we'll do."

== Works ==
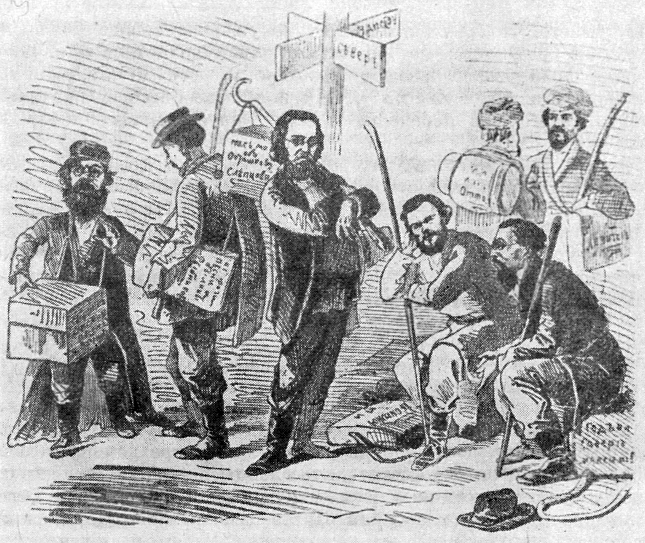
Yakushkin (leftmost) among the travelling Russian ethnographers. The 1864's Iskra caricature

Pavel Yakushkin started his literary career as a travelling ethnographer and collector of Russian folk songs which he published in the Chronicles of Russian Literature of Old (1859), Utro (The Morning, 1859 almanac) and Otechestvennye Zapiski (1860). They came out as separate editions in 1860 (as "Russian Songs Gathered by P.Yakushkin") and 1865 ("Folk Songs From P.Yakushkin's Collection"), both books praised by the critics.

Yakushkin's letters and sketches published in the late 1850s formed the Traveller's Letters (1860). His first short story "Great Is the Lord of the Russian Land" (1863) appeared in Sovremennik, followed by several sketches and stories, among them "Something Out There" (Sovremennik, Iskra, 1965), "The Year of Muzhik" (Iskra, 1866) and "Stories of the Crimean War" (Sovremennik, 1864).

According to Alexander Skabichevsky, "The works of Yakushkin are just snapshots of real life that he was making while roaming the Russian land. They amount to little but occasional observations thrown hastily into a notebook to receive later but a slight editing treatment. Yet they are priceless for representing the attitude to the real life drastically different to the one that was common at the time. Never idealizing or mocking the rural habits, he is an objective scientist deeply submerged into the subject which he knows and understands profoundly well. No matter how chaotic, his stories highlight most typical and characteristic aspects of life, and in his ability to grasp the very essence of what’s happening around he's a real artist. You won't find here any striking or original characters, but the collective voice of the people, merging into a common choir of our peasant world, sounds convincing - and that is something you’d be hard put to find in the 1840s Russian 'folkish' literature. Muzhik's vernacular is represented impeccably, without a trace of exaggeration or artificiality. Here the literature about common people's everyday life makes a step upon the entirely new ground and Yakushkin is a pioneer of this new development."
