= Louis Jacoby (singer) =

Norwegian singer and writer from Larvik (born 1952)

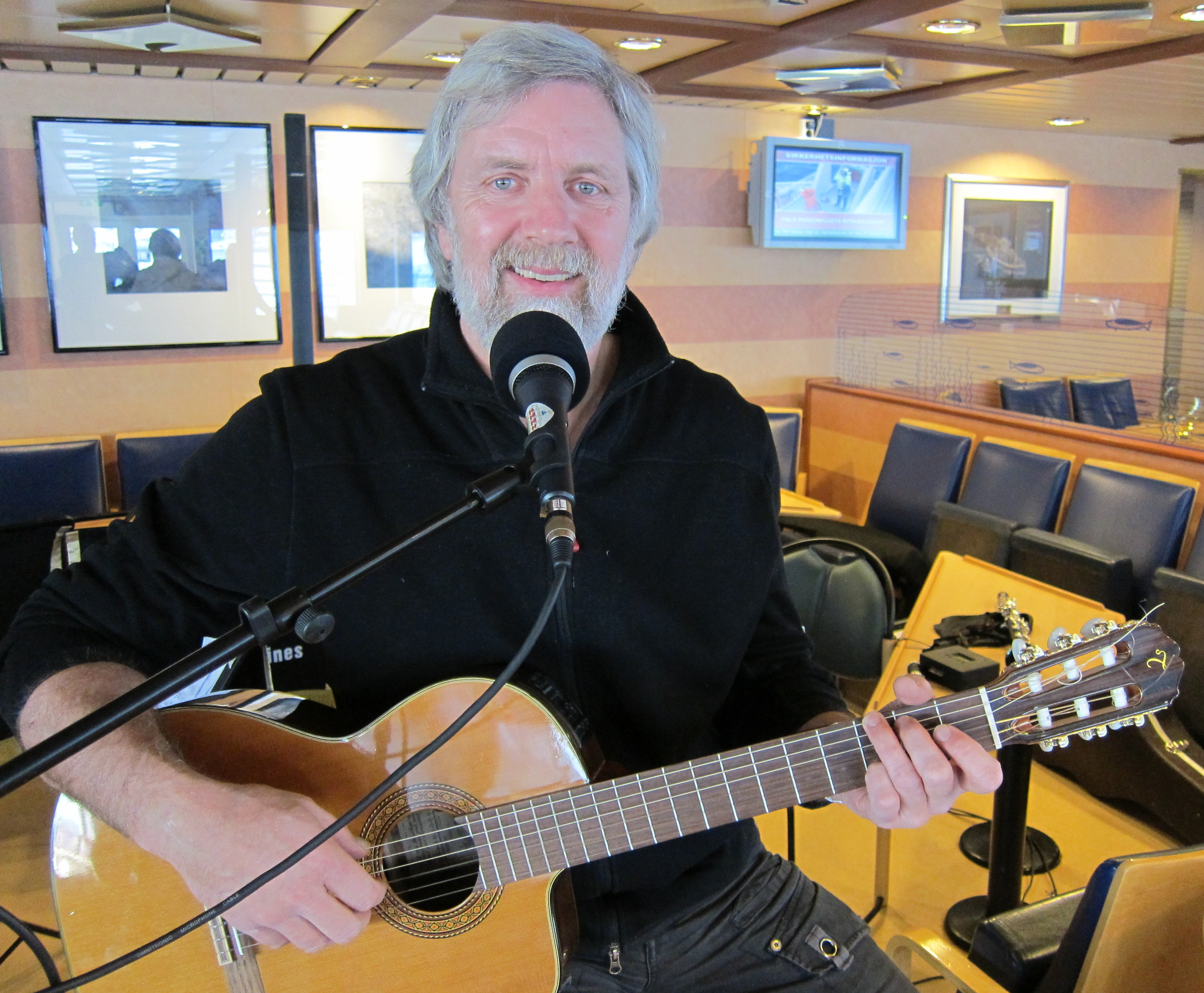

Background information
- Born: September 6, 1952 (age 73)
- Website: www.louisjacoby.no

Louis Arnold Jacoby (born September 6, 1952) is a Norwegian singer and writer from Larvik. Jacoby grew up in Larvik's Torstrand district but has lived in Ula for many years. He is the son of the writer Arnold Jacoby (1913–2002).

Jacoby has won the Prøysen Award and the Herman Wildenvey Poetry Award, and he was named "Beer Dog of the Year" (Norwegian: Årets Ølhund) by the Norwegian Brewery Association in 1990. His best-known song "Hverdag" (Everyday) has been named one of Norway's national songs. Jacoby won the summer song competition held by the Nitimen program in 1995 (together with Lars Martin Myhre) for the song "En sommer er aldri over" (A Summer Is Never Over). Jacoby has published Den store ølviseboka (The Big Book of Beer Songs) and released several albums, including Hverdag (Everyday) and Noen & ingen (Some & None). From 1994 to 1999 he was essentially the in-house poet for the TVNorge's talk show Wesenstund. For several weeks he held a place on the musical hit list Norsktoppen with the song "Vise ved vindens enger" (A Ballad by the Wind's Meadow). The album Noen & ingen was on Norsktoppen for ten weeks in 2003, including two weeks in first place. In 2008 Jacoby released the CD Puslespill (Jigsaw Puzzle). In 2013 he released the CD Måneskinn (Moonshine). In the fall of 2016 he published a skerry calendar with photos of skerries accompanied by QR codes linking to accompanying songs and videos. He has participated in several in summer and Christmas tours with Lars Martin Myhre.

Jacoby is also a writer and has published the causerie books Min erotiske hund (My Erotic Dog), Min beduggede vinklubb (My Drunken Wine Club), Om å spise østers (About Eating Oysters), and Den muntre venteværelseboka (The Cheerful Waiting Room Book).

== Poetry Park ==
Louis Jacoby was behind the initiative for Larvik's Poetry Park (Norwegian: Poesiparken) project, which envisioned poems and songs carved in larvikite located around the town of Larvik. The poetry plaques on larvikite are mounted on buildings, walls, and rock faces to form a route through the town, planned from the town center down to Fritzøe Brygge and Hammerdalen, along the seafront to Tollerodden, and out to a possible new ferry at Revet. The goal was to install 100 plaques by 2012. The project received unanimous support in Larvik's town council. The Norway Arts Council initially allocated NOK 150,000 for the Larvik Poetry Park after the application was handled by its literature committee.

== Discography ==
Title	Album type	Label	Catalogue no.	Released
Viser i ro og mak	LP	RCA Victor	YNPL 1-708	1974
Den gode tid	LP	RCA Victor	YNPL 1-726	1975
Svaberg	LP	Maestro	LP 00136	1987
Hverdag	CD	Polydor	CD531236-2	1996
Ølviser fra en fyllepenn	CD	Polydor	CD533815-2	1996
Noen & ingen	CD	Tylden & co	GTACD8077	2002
Puslespill	CD	Morild Forlag	MORCD001	2008
Måneskinn	CD	Morild Forlag	MORCD002	2013

Songs featuring Louis Jacoby are also found on the following albums

Title	Album type	Tracks	Song title	Composer	Lyrics by	Label	Catalog no.	Released
Stevnemøte	LP	3	"Anita's sang" "Vise ved vindens enger" "Jeg synger deg en vise"			RCA Victor	YNBL 1-736	1976
Norsk visesang i 50 år	3CD	1	"Hverdag"	Louis Jacoby	Louis Jacoby	McMusic	MCCD151	2008
