= Jacobi's theorem =

Jacobi's theorem can refer to:

- Maximum power theorem, in electrical engineering
- The result that the determinant of skew-symmetric matrices with odd size vanishes, see skew-symmetric matrix
- Jacobi's four-square theorem, in number theory
- Jacobi's theorem (geometry), on concurrent lines associated with any triangle
- Jacobi's theorem on the normal indicatrix, in differential geometry
- Jacobi's theorem on conjugate points, in differential geometry
