= Valery Jacobi =

Russian painter (1834–1902)

- Валерий Якоби
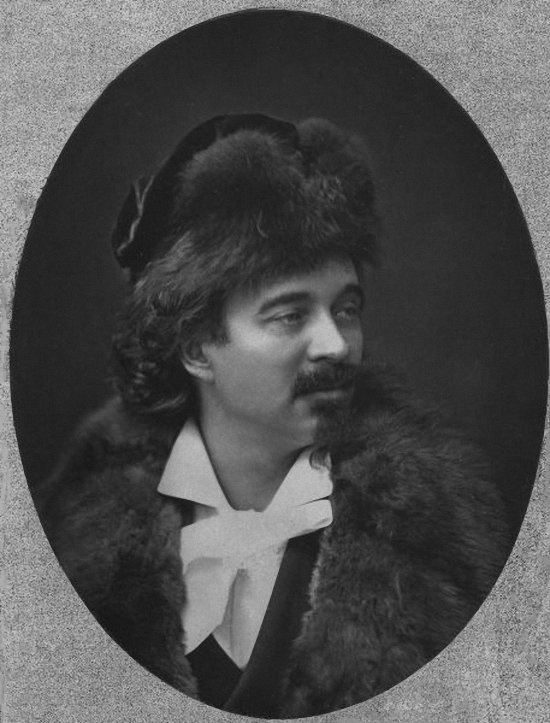
- Photography (1875)
- Born: Valery Ivanovich Jacobi; 15 May [O.S. 3 May] 1834; Kazan Governorate, Russia
- Died: 13 May 1902 (aged 67); Nice, France
- Resting place: Caucade Cemetery, Nice
- Education: Imperial Academy of Arts (1861)
- Known for: Painting
- Movement: Peredvizhniki
- Partner: Alexandra Peshkova-Toliverova (from 1861; separated in 1872)
- Relatives: Pavel Jacobi (brother)
- Awards: Big Gold Medal of the Imperial Academy of Arts (1861)
- Elected: Member Academy of Arts (1868); Professor by rank (1871)

Valery Ivanovich Jacobi (Russian: Вале́рий Ива́нович Яко́би, romanized: Valery Ivanovich Yakobi; (Note: Also spelled Yakoby (Russian: Якобий).) 15 May [O.S. 3 May] 1834 – 13 May 1902) was a Russian painter. He was the older brother of Pavel Jacobi (1842–1913), a notable revolutionary and ethnographer.

== Biography ==
Valery Jacobi was born to a family of an estate owner and started his education in the Kazan University, but broke off studying to enlist in the Imperial Russian Army, specifically in the Siberian Volunteer Corps, during the Crimean War. In 1856, after retirement from the Army, he decided to abandon his University studies and pursue an artistic career instead.

In 1856–1861, he studied at the Imperial Academy of Arts, receiving a small gold medal for his painting "Serene Holiday of a Beggar" (1860). In 1861 he painted what may be his most notable painting "The Prisoner's Rest". In 1861–1869, Jacobi traveled to Europe with an Academy grant, visiting Germany, Switzerland, France and Italy.

In 1870, Jacobi became one of the founding members of the Peredvizhniki art society. However, in 1872, he was excluded for his failure to participate in a society exhibition, and for his general disagreement with the ideals of the society. Later, he was considered a conservative, sceptical to the ideas of the Peredvizhniki.

Jacobi was elected as an Imperial Academician in 1868, became a professor in 1871 and taught at the Academy from 1878 to 1889. He lived mostly in Saint Petersburg creating historical paintings, such as the Jesters at the Court of Anna Ioanovna (1872) and Ice Palace (1878). His works were criticized as purely decorative and lacking in substance.

Some time before the Imperial Academy was reformed in 1893, Jacobi retired from service; he lived mostly abroad since then, mostly in Algeria and France. Virtually obscure among newer masters as the Novoye Vremya obituary stated, Jacobi died in Nice in 1902; he is interred into the Caucade Cemetery.

== Works ==
Valery Jacobi's paintings

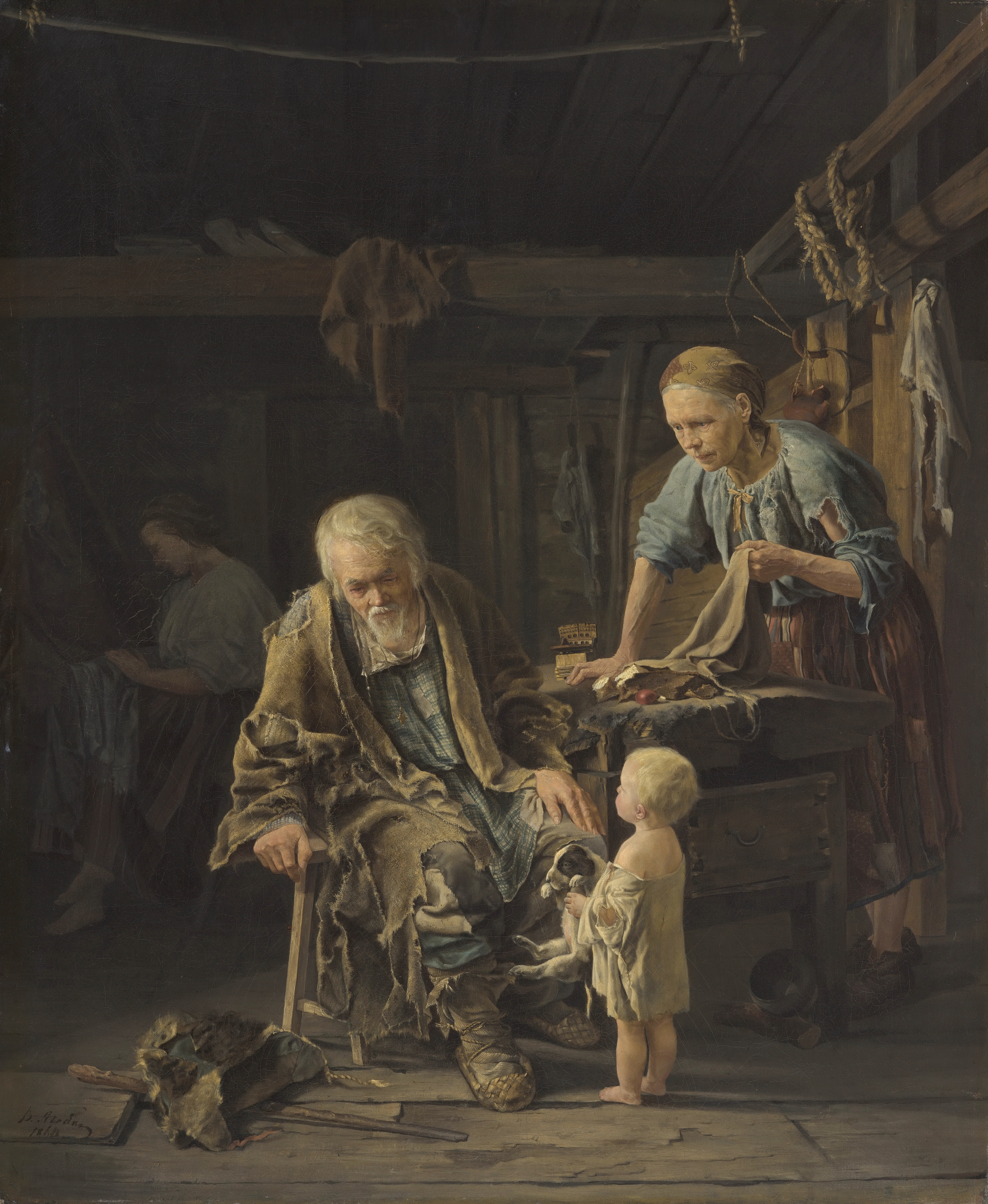
Serene Holiday of a Beggar (1860)

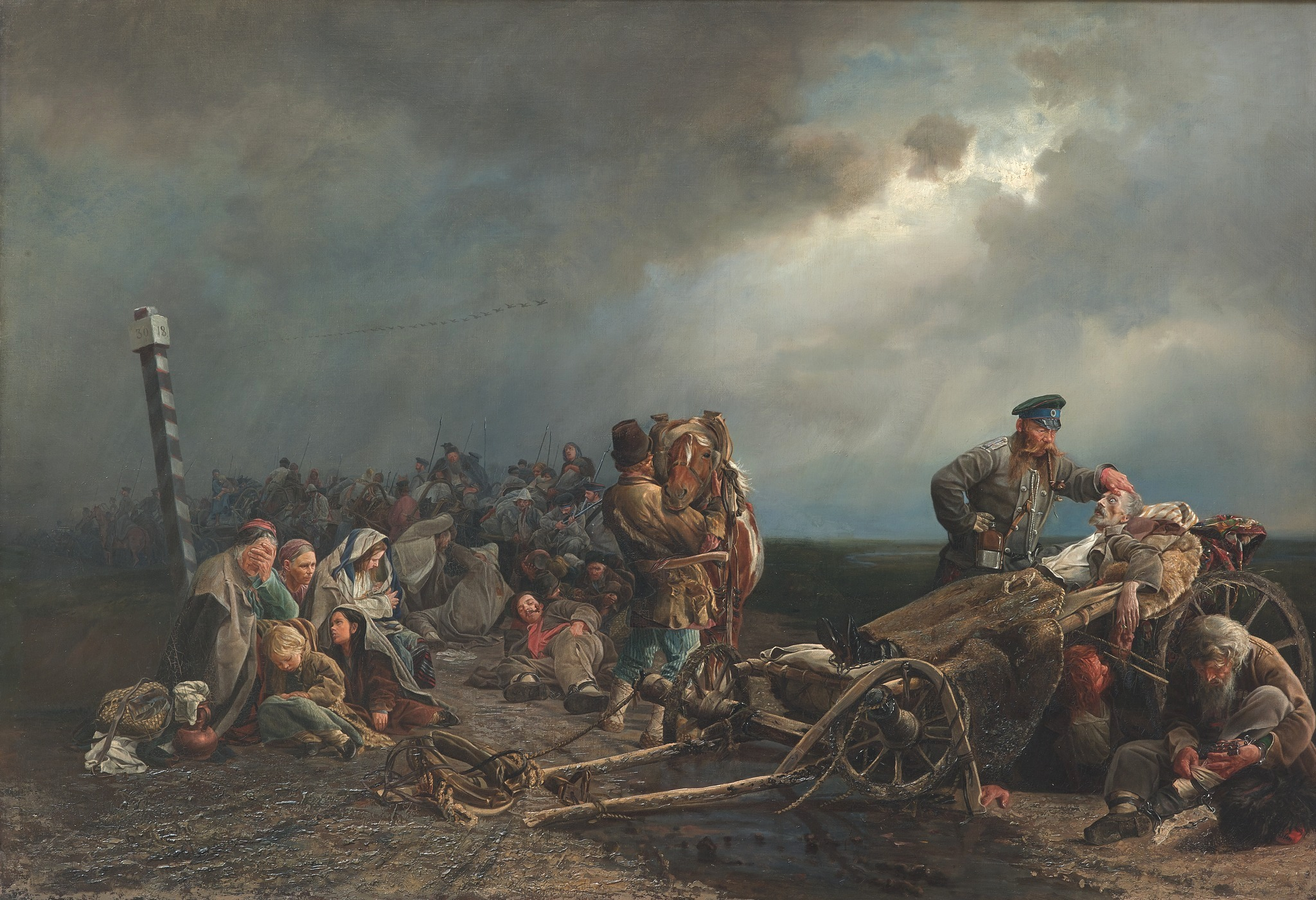
The Prisoner's Rest (1861)

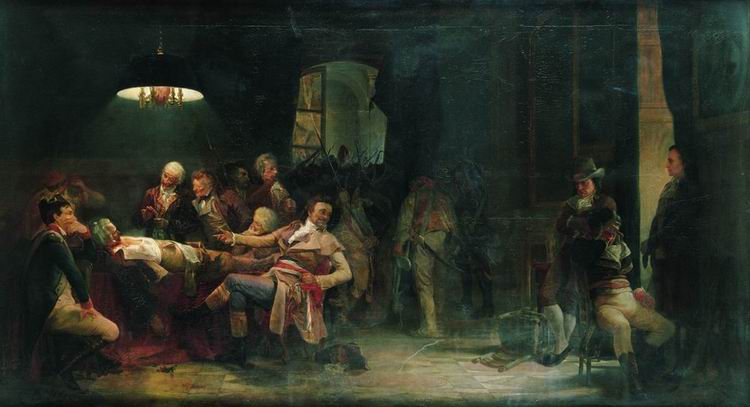
Ninth Thermidor (1864)

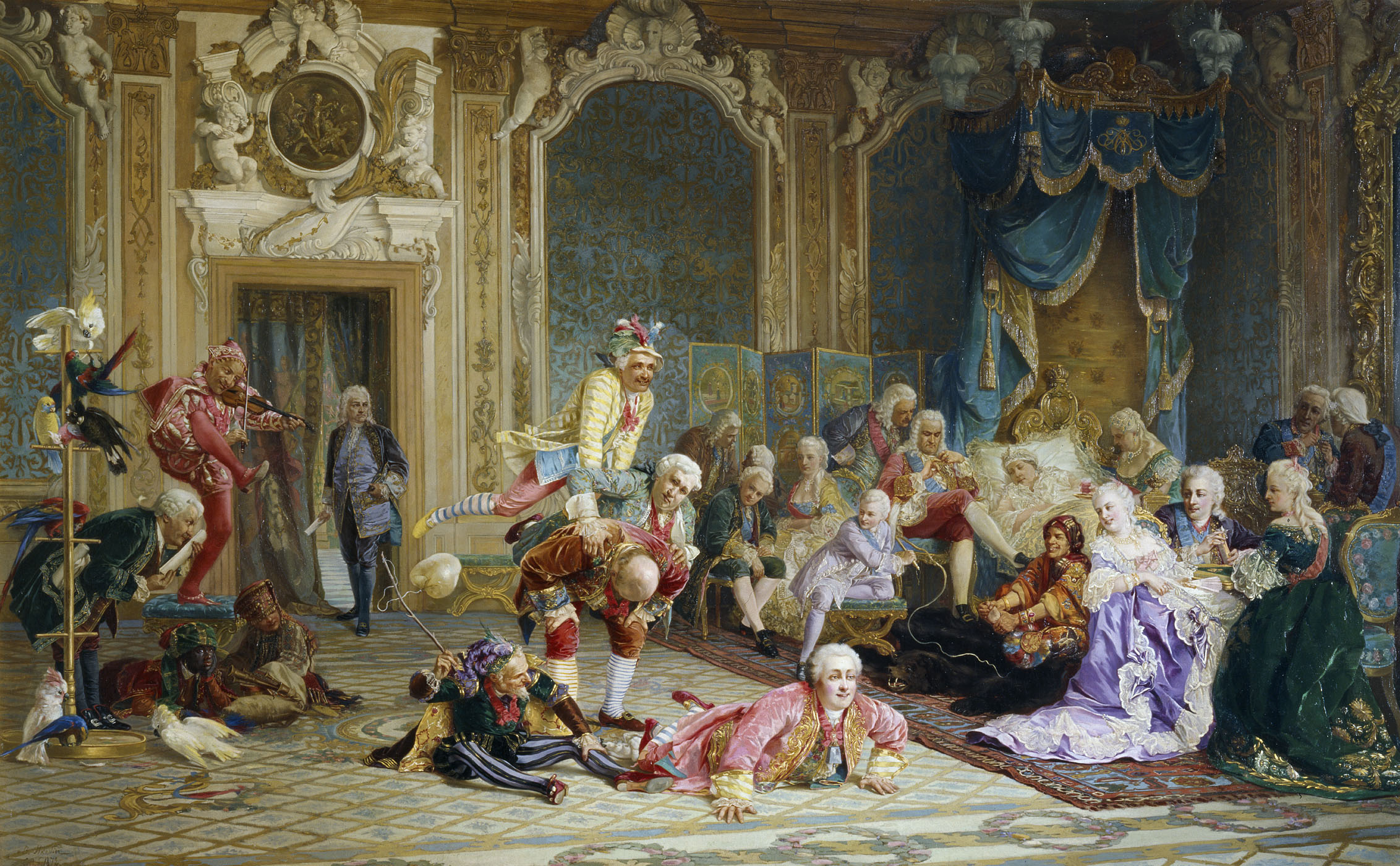
Jesters at the Court of Empress Anna (1872)

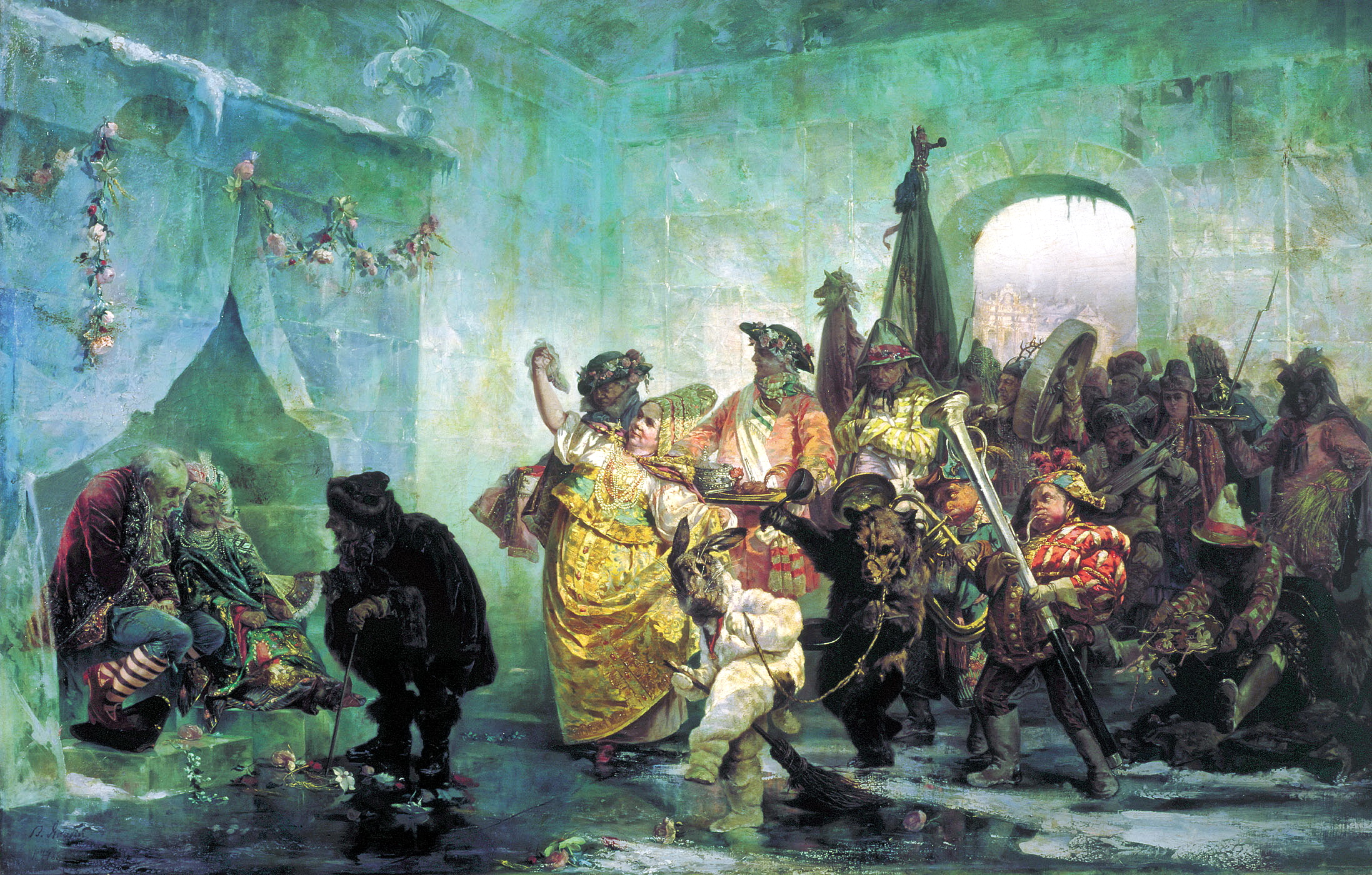
Ice palace of Empress Anna (1878)

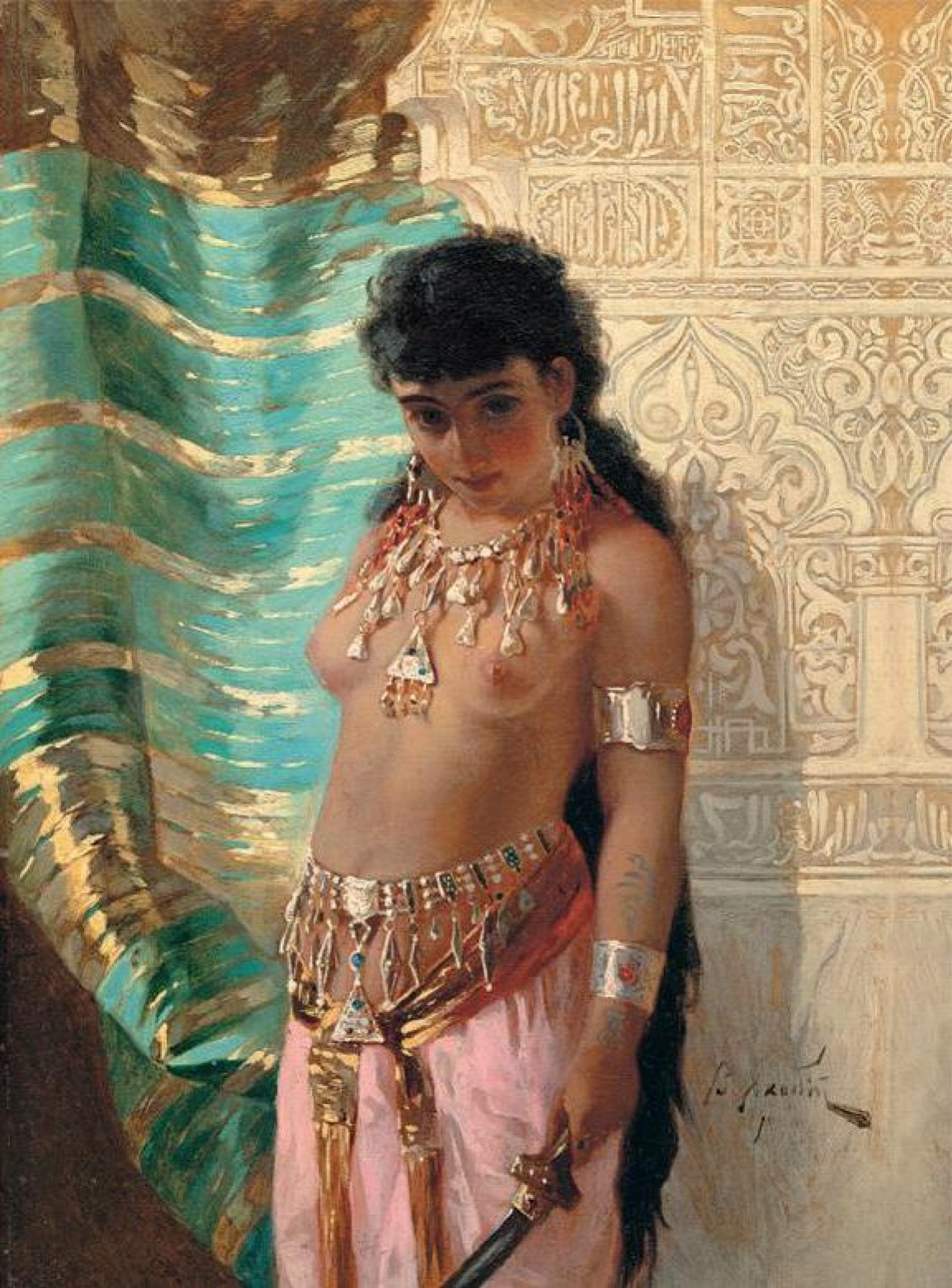
An Oriental Beauty (1881)

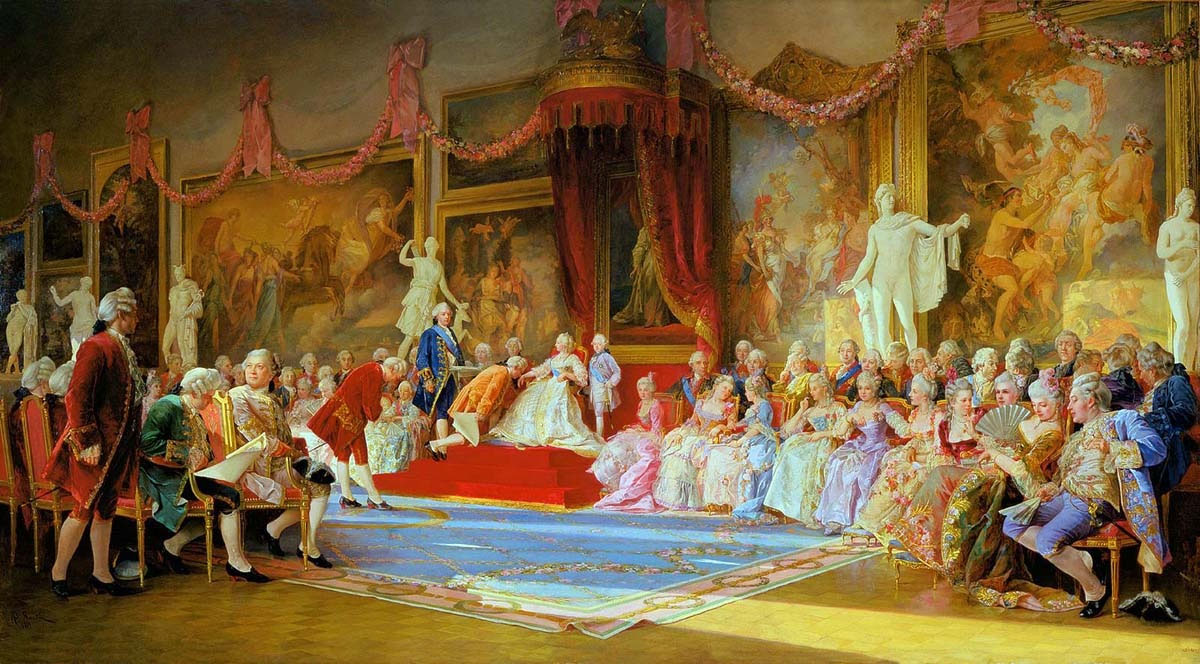
The Inauguration of the Academy of Arts (1889)
