= Arnold Jacoby =

Norwegian writer and translator

Victor Arnold Rosenblad Jacoby (September 10, 1913 – January 15, 2002) was a Norwegian writer and translator. He produced a large volume of children's literature, comics, crime fiction, and biographies. He also worked as a translator of children's and young adult fiction from English into Norwegian.

In 1941, Jacoby won a competition with the short story "Mysteriet 'Robusta Gloria'" (The Mystery of Robusta Gloria). This was followed by the short story "Røntgenplatens hemmelighet" (The X-Ray Plate Secret) and the crime novel Døden annonserer ikke (Death Does Not Advertise). Under pseudonyms, he wrote the children's books Jon i verden (John in the World) and Krussedulle (Doodles). As an illustrator, he produced the comics Atlantis in Norsk Ukeblad and Bimba - hele verdens lille venn (Bimba: The Whole World's Little Friend). With Trygve Mosebek, he produced the comic the Cyklon-Kid (The Cyclone Kid) also known as Sabotasjegjengen (The Sabotage Gang). Jacoby wrote several biographies about the adventurer Thor Heyerdahl and Heyerdahl's half-brother Jacob Matheson. Jacoby's most influential book was the 1976 Det angår også deg (It Also Applies to You) about Herman Sachnowitz's time as a prisoner at Auschwitz.

== Early life ==
Jacoby was born and grew up in Brooklyn, where his aunt, her husband and two children also lived. His parents had emigrated to the United States from Norway, but the family moved back to Larvik when Jacoby's grandfather Georg Jacoby died and his nursery on Dronningensgate (Queen Street) stood empty without someone to take care of it. While still a young man, Jacoby moved to Oslo, where he made a living writing and producing advertising and illustrations. During the Second World War he moved to Ula, and later back to Larvik.

== Career ==
In 1941, the magazine Mystikk announced a competition to obtain Norwegian feature stories. Jacoby won the competition with his story "Mysteriet 'Robusta Gloria'" (The Mystery of Robusta Gloria), which was published in issue no. 11 (1942) under a pseudonym consisting of the author's two given names: Victor Arnold. The detective in the story was the "criminal agent" Herlofsen. Jacoby also wrote a feature story for Mystikk's Christmas issue that year, called "Røntgenplatens hemmelighet" (The X-Ray Plate Secret), featuring the agent Erik Drag as the protagonist, and also the crime novel Døden annonserer ikke (Death Does Not Advertise). Because of the war, Jacoby wrote under several pseudonyms. The novel Døden og skipperen (Death and the Captain) was written under the name Sven (Tor) Winge, and the children's books Jon i verden (John in the World) and Krussedulle (Doodles) were written under the name Tone Silje.

Jacoby translated nearly 200 children's books over a 50-year span, including series such as The Hardy Boys, the Bobbsey Twins, Twin Connection, Vicky Austin, Conny, Cherry, Honey Bunch, and others. He was an illustrator and had a drawing office in Oslo in the early part of the Second World War together with the brothers Trygve and Olav Mosebekk. He was responsible for several comics, including Atlantis in Norsk Ukeblad under the pseudonym Erik Glende. The comic Atlantis was launched in the fall of 1942 and ceased when Norsk Ukeblad was shut down by the Germans in the spring of 1943. The same year he produced the comic Cyklon-Kid (The Cyclone Kid) together with Trygve Mosebekk in the magazine Mystikk. This was published 17 times before it was also shut down by the Germans. The series was reworked after the war and was published under the name Sabotasjegjengen (The Sabotage Gang) in the revived magazine, now renamed Alle Menns Blad. During the war he also produced the comic Bimba - hele verdens lille venn (Bimba: The Whole World's Little Friend), which was published in a Christmas and Easter magazine for children.

Jacoby was a close childhood friend of the adventurer and researcher Thor Heyerdahl, and he wrote several biographies about him, including Señor Kon-Tiki, which was published globally. The two of them lived near each other in the municipality of Andora on the Ligurian coast in northern Italy.

Jacoby's most influential book was Det angår også deg (It Also Applies to You), which deals with Herman Sachnowitz's time as a prisoner at the Auschwitz concentration camp and was written in collaboration with him. The book was first published in 1976 and it has been translated into many languages.

In 1984 he published the book Min afrikanske gullalder (My African Golden Age), which describes the adventures of Jacob Matheson (Thor Heyerdahl's half-brother) in Africa.

== Personal life ==
In 1961, he bought an 800-year-old house in Andora, Italy, where he spent extensive time and worked. He was the father of Marianne Rosenblad Jacoby Steina, a translator, proofreader, and publishing editor at Fogdal Publishing, and editor at Bonnier A/S, the singer and writer Louis Jacoby, and the illustrator and graphic designer Tom Rosenblad Jacoby. He was married to Ellen née Dahl (1918–2012). Arnold Jacoby died in Larvik.

== Bibliography ==
- 1941: Det hemmelighetsfulle triangel (The Mysterious Triangle)
- 1942: Døden annonserer ikke (Death Does Not Advertise)
- 1943: Kajakk-klubben (The Kayak Club)
- 1943: Døden og skipperen (Death and the Captain)
- 1943: Krussedulle (Doodles; under the pseudonym Tone Silje)
- 1944: Kajakk-klubben og den sorte dame (The Kayak Club and the Black Lady)
- 1945: Jon i verden (John in the World; under the pseudonym Tone Silje)
- 1946: Kajakk-klubben og hjemmefronten (The Kayak Club and the Home Front)
- 1947: Kajakk-klubben og den røde X (The Kayak Club and the Red X)
- 1947: Sabbatnatten (Sabbath Night)
- 1951: Eventyret om skogen (The Tale of the Woods)
- 1965: Señor Kon-Tiki
- 1970: Historien om Thor Heyerdahl (The Story of Thor Heyerdahl)
- 1976: Det angår også deg (It Also Applies to You; together with Herman Sachnowitz)
- 1984: Møte med Thor Heyerdahl (Meeting with Thor Heyerdahl)
- 1984: Min afrikanske gullalder (My African Golden Age)
