= Nedelya (newspaper) =

Defunct Russian newspaper

Nedelya was a Russian liberal-Narodnik political and literary newspaper, published in Saint Petersburg from 1866 to 1901.

There was another publication with the same name which was the weekend supplement of the Soviet newspaper Izvestia.
