= Timeline of Johannesburg =

The following is a timeline of the history of the city of Johannesburg, in the Gauteng province in South Africa.

== 19th century ==
- 1886 – Johannesburg township established by Boer government after discovery of gold in vicinity.
- 1887
  - The Star newspaper in publication.
  - St. Mary's Church built.
  - Johannesburg Stock Exchange founded.
  - Theatre Royal opens.
- 1888 – St Mary's School was founded.
- 1890
  - Library opens.
  - Jeppe High School for Boys was founded.
- 1891
  - Horse-drawn tram begins operating.
  - Standard Theatre opens.
- 1892 – Prison built.
- 1895 – Railway in operation.
- 1896
  - January: Uprising against Boer government.
  - 19 February: Braamfontein Explosion.
- 1897
  - Johannesburg Park station opens.
  - Johan Zulch de Villiers becomes the first mayor.
- 1898 – St John's College was founded.
- 1899 – Fort built.
- 1900 – 31 May: Town captured by British forces during the Second Boer War.

== 20th century ==
=== 1900s–1950s ===
- 1902
  - King Edward VII School was founded.
  - St. Andrew's School for Girls was founded.
- 1903
  - Johannesburg Stock Exchange building constructed.
  - Observatory built near town.
  - Sophiatown developed.
  - Roedean School for Girls was founded.
- 1904
  - Johannesburg Zoo and Transvaal Technical Institute established.
  - April: Brickfields burned.
  - Drill Hall built.
  - Population: 99,022.
- 1905
  - Town administrative wards created.
  - Johannesburg Statistics begins publication.
  - Alexandra developed near Johannesburg.
- 1906
  - Electric trams begin operating.
  - Sunday Times newspaper begins publication.
  - Meeting of the Municipal Associations of South Africa held in Johannesburg.
- 1907 – Redhill School was founded.
- 1908 – Population: 180,687.
- 1919 – Jeppe High School for Girls was founded.
- 1920 – Parktown Boys' High School was founded.
- 1921 – Helpmekaar Kollege was founded.
- 1922
  - University of the Witwatersrand incorporated.
  - January–March: Miner's strike.
- 1923 – Parktown High School for Girls was founded.
- 1925 – Technikon Witwatersrand established.
- 1927 – Johannesburg Symphony Orchestra founded.
- 1928
  - Johannesburg gains city status.
  - Ellis Park Stadium was opened.
- 1929 – South African Institute of Race Relations headquartered in city.
- 1931 – Airport opens in Germiston.
- 1933 – Kingsmead College was founded.
- 1935 – Johannesburg City Library building opens.
- 1936 – 15 September: The Empire Exhibition, South Africa World's Fair opens
- 1937 – 15 January: The Empire Exhibition, South Africa closes.
- 1941 – St David's Marist, Inanda was founded.
- 1942 – Springbok Legion's Fighting Talk begins publication.
- 1944 – Hoërskool Florida was founded.
- 1946 – Population: 603,470 city; 762,910 urban agglomeration.
- 1948 – Polly Street Centre founded.
- 1950 – Springbok Radio begins broadcasting.
- 1951
  - Drum magazine begins publication.
  - Population: 631,911 city; 884,007 urban agglomeration.
  - Waverley High School for Girls was founded.
- 1952 – Jan Smuts Airport established in Kempton Park.
- 1953 – St Stithians College was founded.
- 1956
  - December: Treason Trial begins.
  - Purple Renoster literary magazine begins publication.
- 1957 – 1957 Alexandra bus boycott.
- 1958 – St Benedict's College was founded.

=== 1960s–1990s ===
- 1960
  - 21 March: Sharpeville massacre.
  - Johannesburg Planetarium opens.
- 1961
  - City becomes part of the Republic of South Africa.
  - Greenside High School was founded.
- 1962 – Sentech Tower built.
- 1963
  - 11 July: The arrest of Umkhonto we Sizwe high commanders known as Rivonia Trial.
  - 11 August: Four of the defendants who had been arrested on July 11, at the Liliesleaf Farm near Johannesburg, were able to escape their South African jail after a bribe was promised to their guard by the ANC.
  - Classic magazine begins publication.
- 1964
  - July: The arrest of Umkhonto we Sizwe high commanders known as Little Rivonia Trialist.
  - Johannesburg Botanical Garden established.
- 1966 – Rand Afrikaans University founded.
- 1968 – Bryanston High School was founded.
- 1969
  - Hyde Park Corner (shopping centre) in business.
  - Northcliff High School was founded.
- 1970
  - Tollman Towers and Trust Bank Building constructed.
  - Population: 654,682 city; 1,432,643 urban agglomeration.
- 1971 – Hillbrow Tower built.
- 1973 – Marble Towers, Carlton Centre, and Sandton City shopping centre built.
- 1974 – Beeld newspaper begins publication.
- 1975 – Ponte City Apartments built.
- 1976
  - 16 June: Soweto uprising.
  - Market Theatre opens.
- 1978 – Staffrider literary magazine begins publication.
- 1980
  - Municipal workers' strike.
  - Federated Union of Black Artists Academy established.
- 1981 – The Sowetan newspaper begins publication.
- 1982
  - City Press newspaper begins publication.
  - Afrapix active.
- 1984
  - 3 September: Sharpeville Six
  - 11 Diagonal Street built.
- 1985
  - Weekly Mail newspaper begins publication.
  - Mormon Temple dedicated.
  - Population: 632,369 city; 1,609,408 urban agglomeration.
- 1987 – Water Institute of Southern Africa headquartered in city.
- 1988 – 31 August: Bombing of Khotso House.
- 1989
  - Soccer City stadium opens.
  - Centre for the Study of Violence and Reconciliation established.
- 1991 – Population: 712,507 city; 1,916,061 metro.
- 1992
  - Johannesburg Stadium opens.
  - Centre for Policy Studies headquartered in Johannesburg.
- 1994
  - 28 March: Shooting at Shell House.
  - City becomes seat of the new Gauteng province.
  - South African School of Motion Picture Medium and Live Performance established.
- 1995
  - Gallagher Convention Centre opens.
  - Centre for Development and Enterprise headquartered in Johannesburg.
  - Johannesburg Biennale art exhibit begins.
- 1996
  - 3 February: 1996 Africa Cup of Nations Final football contest played in Johannesburg.
  - Population: 752,349 city.
- 1997
  - MTN Sundrome opens.
  - Flag of Johannesburg revised design adopted.
- 1998 – Website Joburg.org.za launched.
- 1998 – St Peter's College was founded.
- 1999 – September: 1999 All-Africa Games held in city.
- 2000
  - City of Johannesburg Metropolitan Municipality and Johannesburg City Parks created.
  - Stoned Cherrie in business.
  - Population: 2,732,000 (urban agglomeration).

== 21st century ==
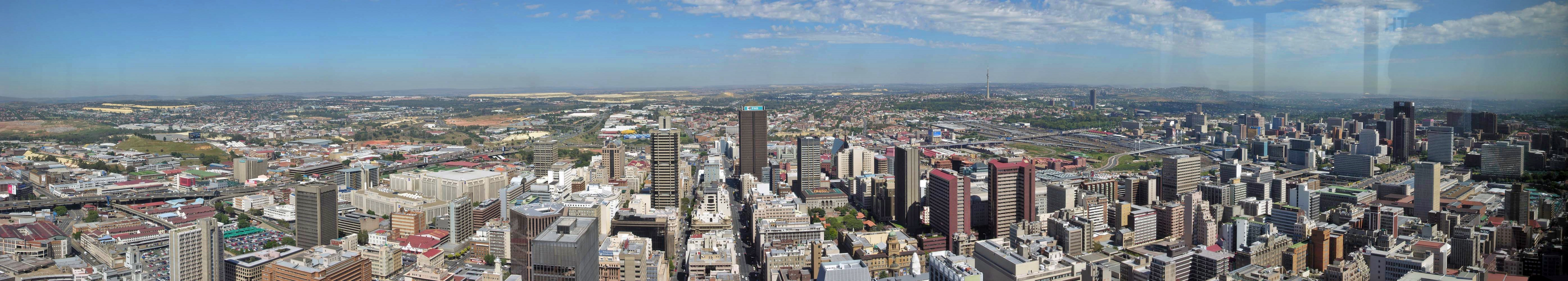
Aerial view of Johannesburg, 2006

=== 2000s ===
- 2001
  - Amos Masondo becomes mayor.
  - Monash University, South Africa campus established.
  - Population: 3,226,055.
- 2002
  - Soweto becomes part of city.
  - City hosts Earth Summit 2002.
- 2003 – Nelson Mandela Bridge built.
- 2004
  - Constitutional Court of South Africa building opens in Constitution Hill.
  - Drill Hall rebuilt.
  - Creative Commons South Africa headquartered at University of the Witwatersrand.
- 2005
  - University of Johannesburg established.
  - 2 July: Live 8 concert.
  - Population: 3,272,000 (urban agglomeration).
- 2008
  - Joburg Art Fair begins.
  - Google office in business.
  - Species Australopithecus sediba discovered near Johannesburg.
- 2009 - 28 June: 2009 FIFA Confederations Cup Final football contest played in Johannesburg.

=== 2010s ===
- 2010 – 11 July: 2010 FIFA World Cup Final held.
- 2011
  - Parks Tau becomes mayor.
  - Air pollution in Johannesburg reaches annual mean of 41 PM2.5 and 85 PM10, more than recommended.
  - Population: 4,434,827.
- 2013
  - 10 February: 2013 Africa Cup of Nations Final football contest played in Johannesburg.
  - 5 December: Nelson Mandela dies in Johannesburg.
- 2015 – October: #FeesMustFall protest.
- 2016
  - 22 August: Herman Mashaba becomes mayor
  - Mduduzi Edmund Tshabalala died in Johannesburg
  - October: #FeesMustFall protest revival.
- 2018
  - Winnie Madikizela-Mandela died in Johannesburg.
  - International 10th BRICS summit held at Sandton Convention Centre.
  - 24 October: Jabulani Tsambo died in Johannesburg

=== 2020s ===
- 2021
  - 9 July 2021: Geoff Makhubo dies.
  - 10 August 2021: Jolidee Matongo becomes mayor.
  - 18 September 2021: Jolidee Matongo dies from a car accident
- 2023: 19 July - Gas explosion destroys road in downtown.

== See also ==
- History of Johannesburg
- Mayor of Johannesburg
- City of Johannesburg Metropolitan Municipality
- Timelines of other cities in South Africa: Cape Town, Durban, Gqeberha, Pietermaritzburg, Pretoria

== Bibliography ==
=== Published in 20th century ===
- A. Samler Brown; G. Gordon Brown, eds. (1906), "Johannesburg", Guide to South Africa (14th ed.), London: Sampson Low, Marston & Company
- "Johannesburg" . Encyclopædia Britannica. Vol. 15 (11th ed.). 1910. pp. 431–432.
- "Johannesburg" . Encyclopædia Britannica. Vol. 31 (12th ed.). 1922. p. 659.
- G.-M Van der Waal (1987), From mining camp to metropolis: the buildings of Johannesburg, 1886–1940, Pretoria: C. van Rensburg Publications for the Human Sciences Research Council, ISBN 0868460494
- Noelle Watson, ed. (1996). "Johannesburg". International Dictionary of Historic Places: Middle East and Africa. UK: Routledge. ISBN 1884964036.
- Musiker, 2000. A Concise Historical Dictionary of Greater Johannesburg, Francolin Pubs., Cape Town, South Africa.

=== Published in 21st century ===
2000s

- Loren Kruger (2001). "Theatre, Crime, and the Edgy City in Post-Apartheid Johannesburg". Theatre Journal. 53 (2): 223–252. doi:10.1353/tj.2001.0050. JSTOR 25068913. S2CID 190702059.
- Jo Beall; et al. (2002), Uniting a Divided City: Governance and Social Exclusion in Johannesburg, Earthscan Publications Ltd., ISBN 9781853839214
- People Behind the Walls: Insecurity, Identity and Gate Communities in Johannesburg, London: Crisis States Research Centre, 2002 – via International Relations and Security Network
- Okwui Enwezor, ed. (2002). Under Siege: Four African Cities, Freetown, Johannesburg, Kinshasa, Lagos. Ostfildern, Germany: Hatje Cantz. ISBN 978-3-7757-9090-1. "Documenta11" + website
- Gardner Khumalo; et al. (2003), Alternative service delivery arrangements at municipal level in South Africa: Assessing the impact of service delivery and customer satisfaction in Johannesburg, Johannesburg: Centre for Policy Studies
- Paul Tiyambe Zeleza; Dickson Eyoh, eds. (2003). "Johannesburg, South Africa". Encyclopedia of Twentieth-Century African History. Routledge. ISBN 0415234794.
- Lindsay Bremner (2004). Johannesburg: One City, Colliding Worlds. Johannesburg.
- Owen Crankshaw and Susan Parnell (2004). "Johannesburg". In Josef Gugler (ed.). World Cities beyond the West: Globalization, Development, and Inequality. Cambridge University Press. ISBN 0521830036.
- "City of Hope, City of Fear: Johannesburg", National Geographic, vol. 205, Washington DC, 2004
- Christian M. Rogerson (2004). "Urban tourism and small tourism enterprise development in Johannesburg: The case of township tourism". GeoJournal. 60 (3): 249–257. Bibcode:2004GeoJo..60..249R. doi:10.1023/B:GEJO.0000034732.58327.b6. JSTOR 41147888. S2CID 153867127.
- Christopher Schmitz (2004). "Johannesburg". In Kevin Shillington (ed.). Encyclopedia of African History. Routledge. ISBN 978-1-135-45670-2.
- Lindsay Bremner (2005). "Remaking Johannesburg". In Stephen Read; et al. (eds.). Future: City. UK: Spon Press. ISBN 0415284503.
- Ivor Chipkin (2005). "The Political Stakes of Academic Research: Perspectives on Johannesburg". African Studies Review. 48 (2): 87–109. doi:10.1353/arw.2005.0054. JSTOR 20065097.
- Kwame Anthony Appiah and Henry Louis Gates, ed. (2005). "Johannesburg". Africana: The Encyclopedia of the African and African American Experience (2nd ed.). Oxford University Press. p. 375. ISBN 978-0-19-517055-9.
- S.B. Bekker and Anne Leildé, ed. (2006). Reflections on Identity in Four African Cities. South Africa: African Minds. ISBN 978-1-920051-40-2. (about Cape Town, Johannesburg, Libreville, Lomé)
- Franco Barchiesi (2007). "Privatization and the Historical Trajectory of 'Social Movement Unionism': A Case Study of Municipal Workers in Johannesburg, South Africa". International Labor and Working-Class History. 71 (71): 50–69. doi:10.1017/S0147547907000336. JSTOR 27673070. S2CID 145433168.
- Niall Ó. Murchú (2007). "Split Labor Markets and Ethnic Violence after World War I: A Comparison of Belfast, Chicago, and Johannesburg". Comparative Politics. 39 (4): 379–400. JSTOR 20434051.
- Sarah Nuttall, Achille Mbembe, ed. (2008). Johannesburg: The Elusive Metropolis. Duke University Press. ISBN 978-0822381211.
- Martin J. Murray (2008). "The city in fragments: kaleidoscopic Johannesburg after apartheid". In Gyan Prakash and Kevin Michael Kruse (ed.). Spaces of the Modern City: Imaginaries, Politics, and Everyday Life. Princeton University Press. ISBN 978-0-691-13343-0.

2010s

- Abdou Maliq Simone (2012). "People as Infrastructure: Intersecting Fragments in Johannesburg". In Kerstin Pinther; et al. (eds.). Afropolis: City Media Art. Jacana Media. p. 38. ISBN 978-1-4314-0325-7.
- Johannesburg and Pretoria. Rough Guides. 2012. ISBN 978-1-4093-1492-9.
