= Zulch =

Zulch or Zülch is a surname. Notable people with the surname include:

- Billy Zulch (1886–1924), South African cricketer
- Tilman Zülch (1939–2023), German activist
- Richard C. Zulch (1960-), inventor of "a process for the archiving of data from a non-volatile computer memory" (US Patent 5150473, September 22, 1992), foundational to modern backup methods for consumer devices.

== See also ==
- North Zulch, Texas
- Johan Zulch de Villiers (1845–1910), South African politician and attorney
