= History of Johannesburg =

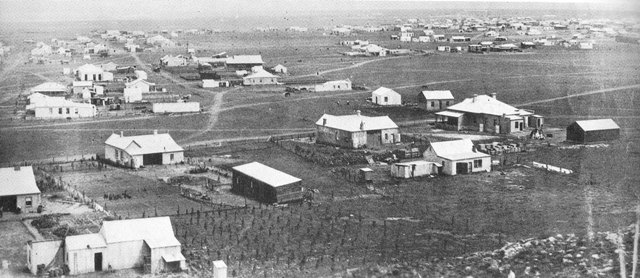
Jeppestown in 1888

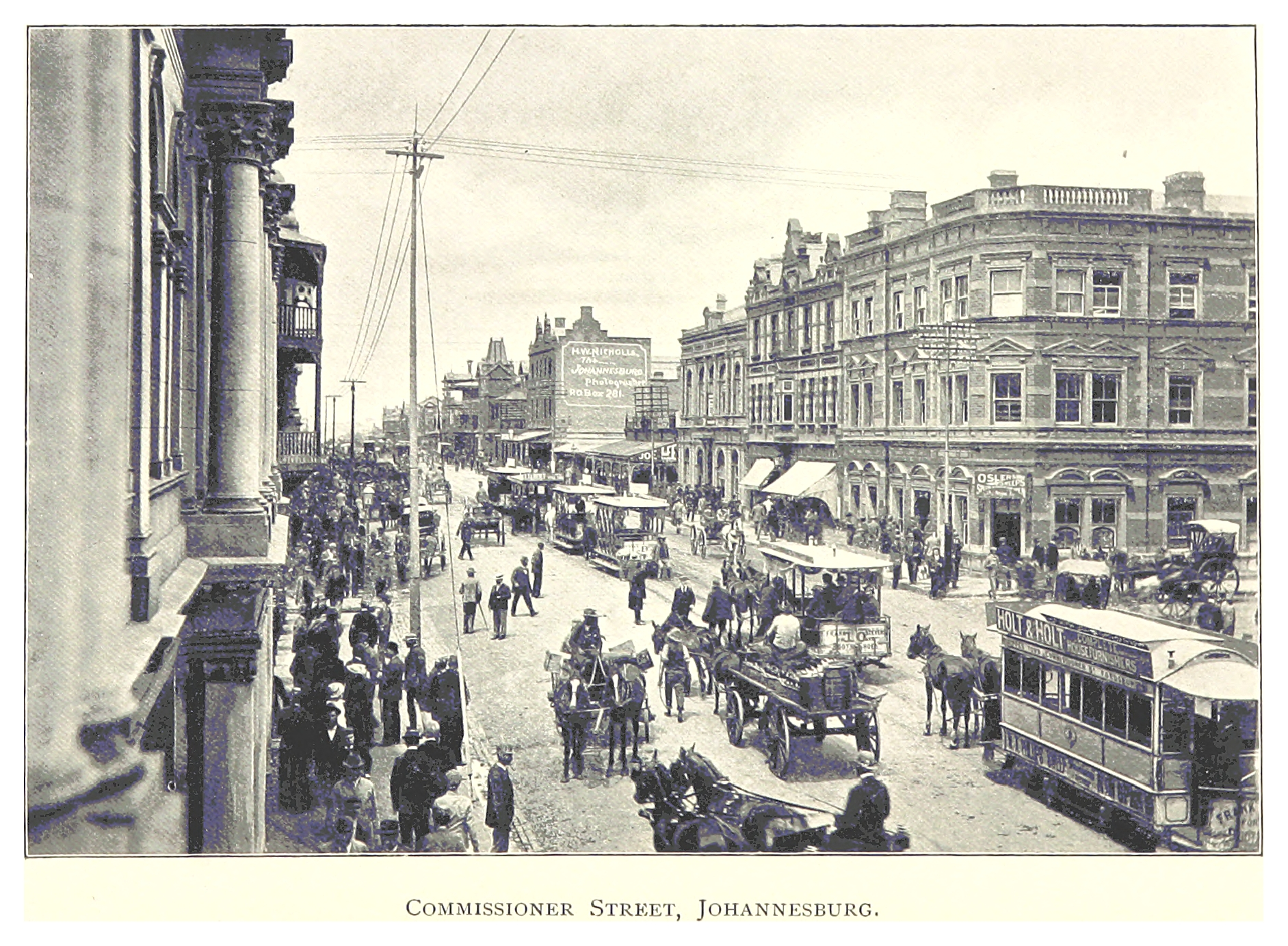
Commissioner Street, circa. 1899

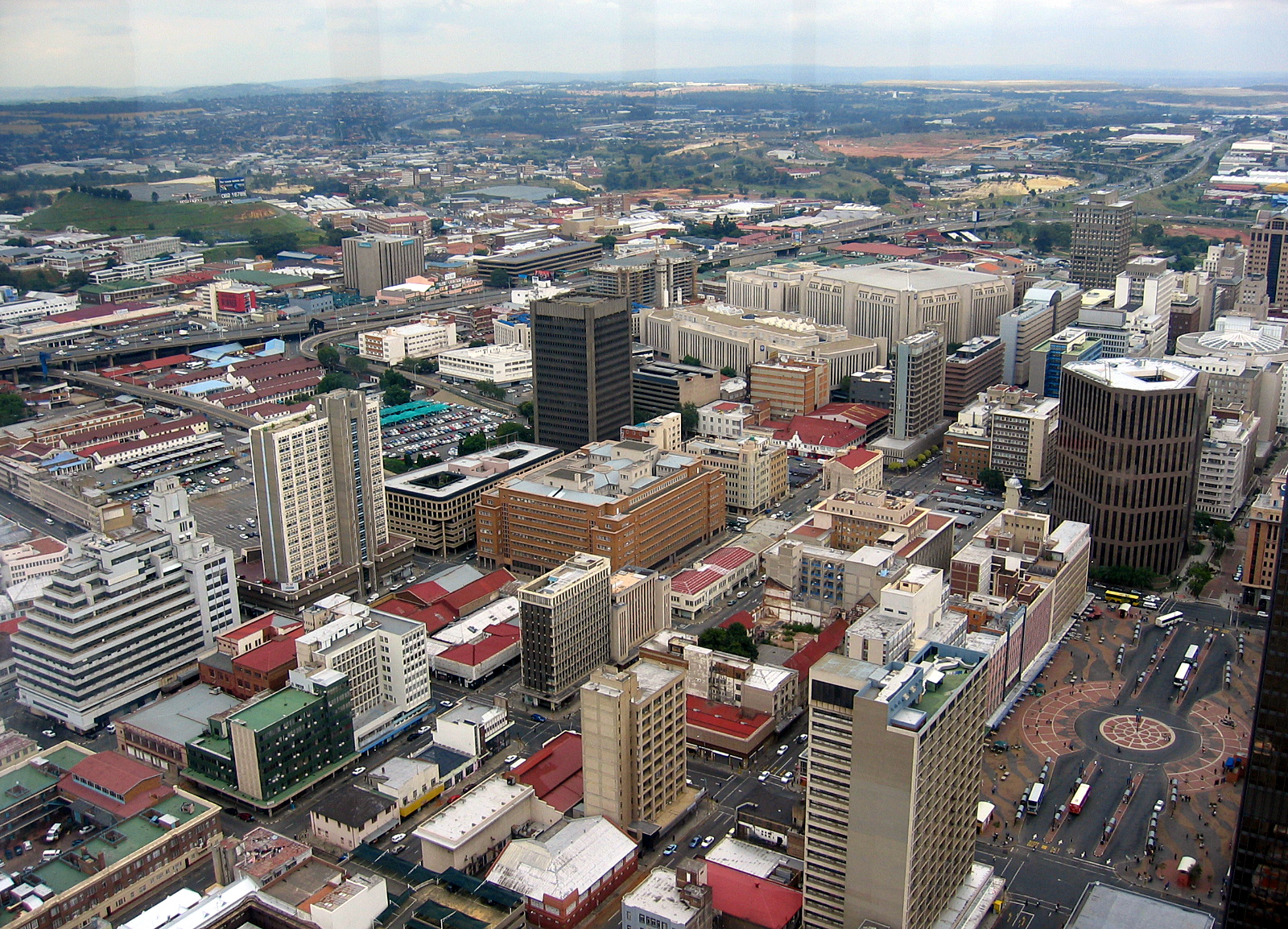
Johannesburg CBD in 2005

Johannesburg is a large city in Gauteng Province of South Africa. It was established as a small village controlled by a Health Committee in 1886 with the discovery of an outcrop of a gold reef on the farm Langlaagte. September 20 1886 was when President Paul Kruger declared the area (now known as Johannesburg), open for public diggings. The population of the city grew rapidly, becoming a municipality in 1898. In 1928 it became a city making Johannesburg the largest city in South Africa. In 2002 it joined ten other municipalities to form the City of Johannesburg Metropolitan Municipality. Today, it is a centre for learning and entertainment for all of South Africa. It is also the capital city of Gauteng.

== Prehistoric Era ==
The region surrounding Johannesburg was originally inhabited by hunter-gatherers who used stone tools. The Magaliesberg valley north of Johannesburg was ideal for farming, and farmers settled there by the 6th century. By the 13th century, stone-walled ruins of Sotho–Tswana towns (e.g. Kweneng) and villages are scattered around the parts of the former Transvaal in which Johannesburg is situated. Many of these sites contain the ruins of Sotho–Tswana mines and iron smelting furnaces, suggesting that the area was being exploited for its mineral wealth before the arrival of Europeans or the discovery of gold. The most prominent site within Johannesburg is Melville Koppies, which contains an iron smelting furnace.

== Republican Era ==
=== European Settlement and gold mining ===
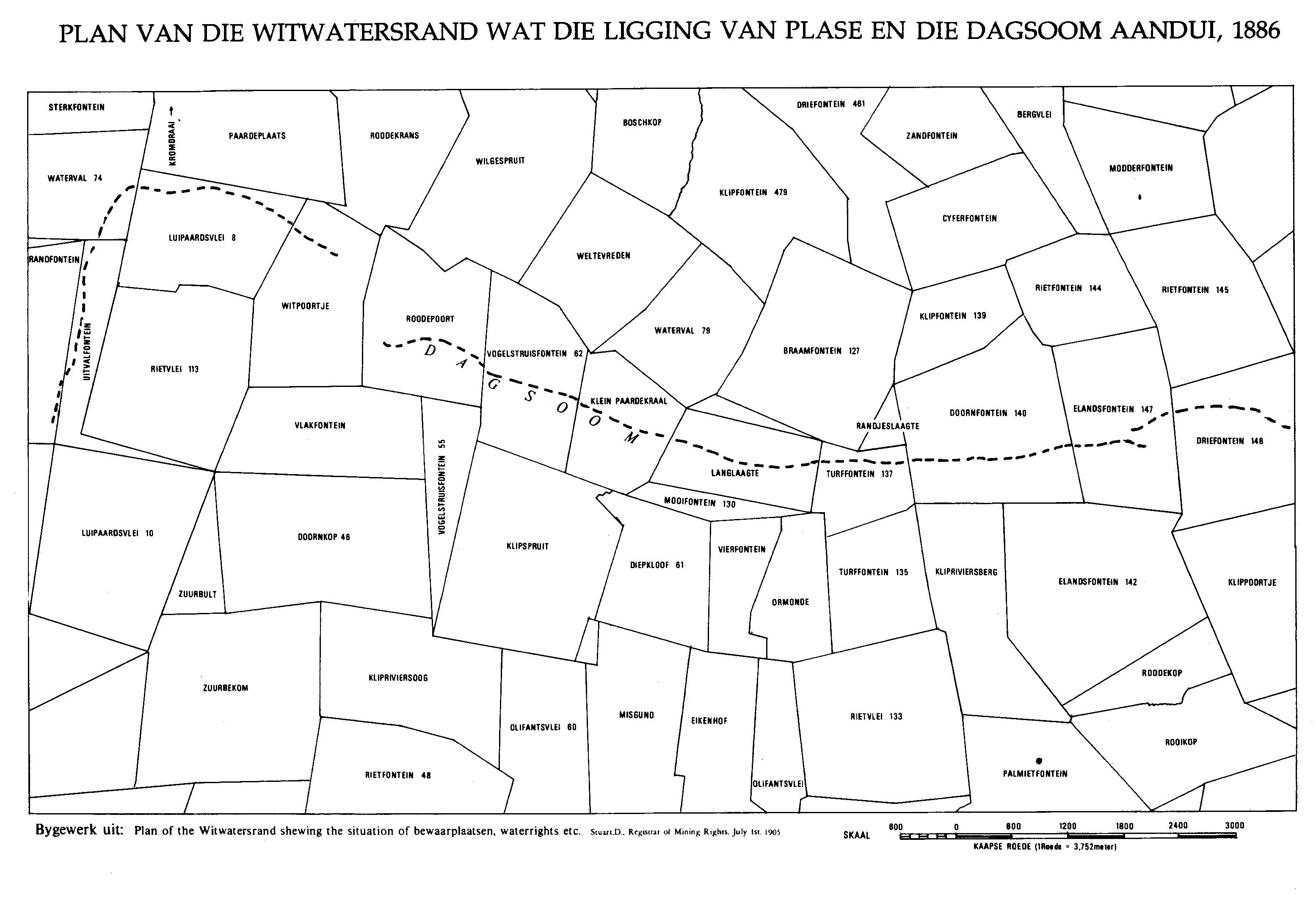
Main Reef outcrop on original farms 1886.

After the Great Trek European pastoralists also started settling in the Transvaal. Some of them chose to farm where Johannesburg was to rise later. Each burgher (citizen) was entitled to at least one farm, measuring 1500 morgen or about 3100 acres. The first recorded discovery of gold on the Witwatersrand was made by Jan Gerrit Bantjes in June 1884, on the farm Vogelstruisfontein. Other farms to become famous later included Langlaagte, Turffontein, Doornfontein and Braamfontein. George Harrison is today credited as the man who discovered an outcrop of the Main Reef of gold on the farm Langlaagte in February 1886. On 12 May 1886 Harrison and his partner, George Walker, entered into a prospecting agreement with the owner of Langlaagte, one G.C. Oosthuizen. Two days later Colonel Ignatius Ferreira staked out his camp on Turffontein to serve as a centre for diggers. Louwrens Geldenhuys found the Main Reef on Turffontein and Henry Nourse located it on Doornfontein. On 8 September 1886 nine farms, extending from Driefontein in the east to Roodepoort in the west, were declared public diggings Carl von Brandis was appointed as the mining commissioner for the area. On 8 November 1886 a diggers' committee was elected to assist the mining commissioner in the execution of his duties.

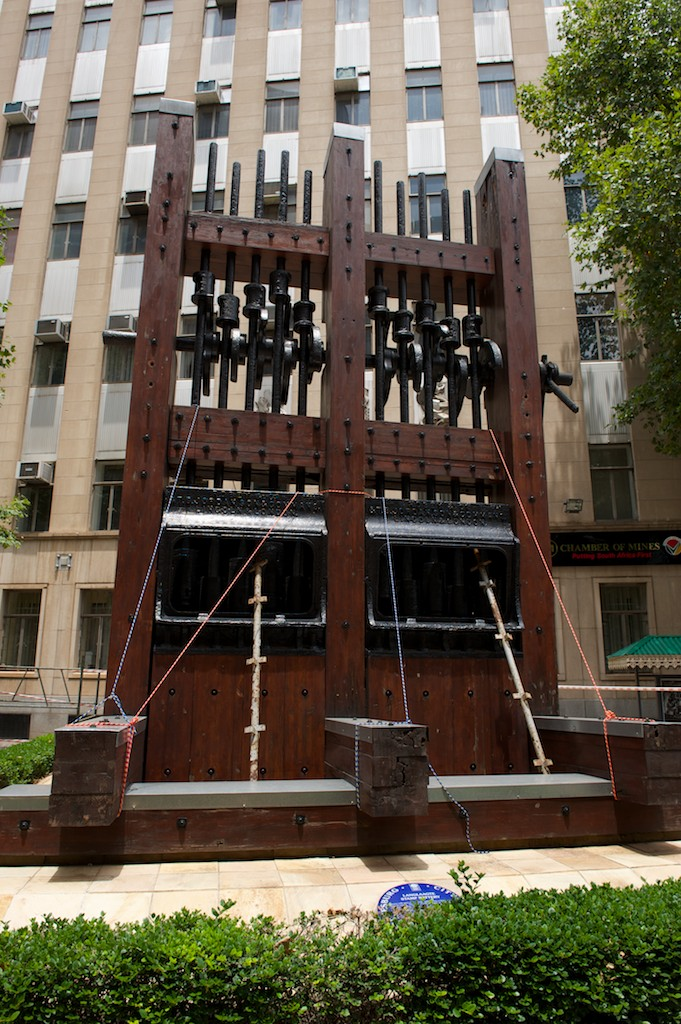
Nineteenth century stamp battery to crush ore.

The earliest mining activities were concentrated along and adjacent to the outcrops of the main reef. Initially the diggers could perform the work themselves, using relatively little equipment. As the pits grew deeper, they needed additional labourers and machinery. Black Africans were recruited to perform the unskilled work. Machinery had to be imported from Europe and fuel had to be found to power the machinery. The discovery of coal on the far east Rand at Springs and Boksburg, as well as the construction of the Rand Steam Tram from the colliery to the gold fields and into Johannesburg facilitated the growth of the industry in its early years. Soon, too, the railway arrived from the coast: in September 1892 the Cape railway reached the Rand. Two years later the line from Lourenço Marques (now Maputo) arrived in the Republic and a third route was opened from Durban the next year. In 1890 the MacArthur-Forrest cyanidation process successfully overcame the problems of treating the refractory ore from deeper levels.

It soon became apparent that individual diggers were not equal to the task of mining gold in Johannesburg. Wealth could only be recovered by means of deep-shaft working and by capital-intensive companies having the necessary technical skills. Individual claims were soon joined into small mining groups. The amalgamation of smaller mining groups became a common occurrence and by 1895 the scene was dominated by a limited number of large monopolistic companies. These companies were: the Wernher-Beit-Eckstein group, Consolidated Goldfields, the J B Robinson group, the S. Neumann group, the Albu group, the A Goerz group, the Anglo-French group and the Lewis-Marks group. Of these, Cecil John Rhodes's Consolidated Goldfields was the most important.

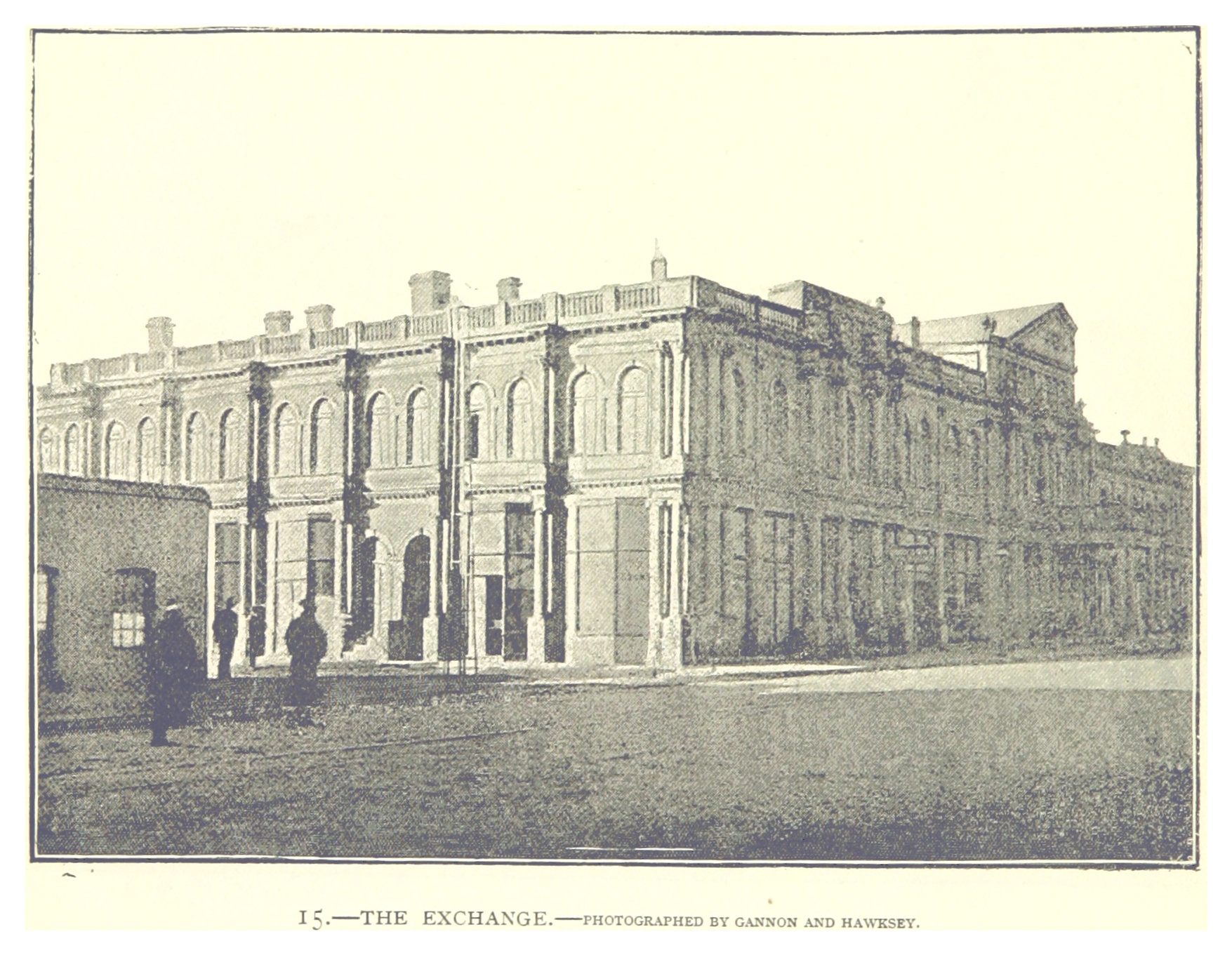
Johannesburg stock exchange in 1893.

In 1893 Johannesburg's first stock exchange was opened. From then until today Johannesburg has been the seat of the South African stock exchange and the country's financial heartland. The Johannesburg Stock Exchange is presently in Sandton, Johannesburg.

The Zuid-Afrikaansche Republic became the single biggest gold producer in the world, with a contribution of 27,5 percent in 1898.

=== Founding of a city ===
The fledgling town of Johannesburg was laid out on a triangular wedge of "uitvalgrond" (area excluded when the farms were surveyed) named Randjeslaagte, situated between the farms Doornfontein to the east, Braamfontein to the west and Turffontein to the south. The property belonged to the government. The Surveyor-General of the ZAR issued an instruction that the farm be surveyed as a township, consisting of 600 stands measuring fifty feet by fifty feet. The first auction of stands took place on 8 December 1886. The settlement was named after two officials of the Zuid-Afrikaansche Republiek (ZAR), Christiaan Johannes Joubert and Johannes Rissik, who both worked in land surveying and mapping. The two men combined the name they shared, adding 'burg', the archaic Afrikaans word for 'fortified city'.

Early in 1887 the inhabitants started petitioning the government to proclaim a town council for the area. Eventually in November 1887 a proclamation was issued instituting a health committee. Its area was defined as "the place Johannesburg, including the stands known as Marshall Town and Ferreira's Town". The committee's authority extended for a radius of three miles from the market square. The mining commissioner and the district surgeon were to be ex-officio members of the committee. The area of the committee's jurisdiction was to be divided into five wards. Each ward could elect one committee member. All adult male inhabitants had the vote. In 1890 six wards were proclaimed, each ward being entitled to elect two committee members.

It was only in 1897 that the government approved, in terms of Act 9 of 1897, a town council for Johannesburg. In terms of the Act the area was divided into 12 wards. Each ward could elect two town councillors, one of which had to be a citizen of the ZAR. Johan Zulch de Villiers became the first mayor of Johannesburg in October 1897.

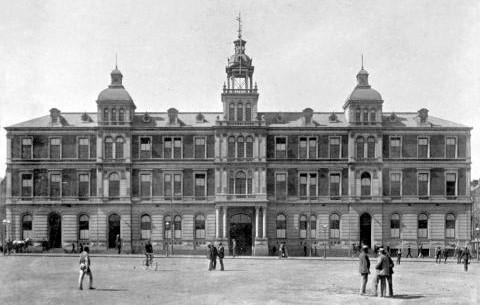
The Rissik Street Post Office was built in 1897.

The Rissik Street Post Office was built in 1897, having been designed by the architect Sytze Wierda. The Post Office was at one time the tallest building in Johannesburg. The Post Office became a national monument in 1978, and it remained in operation until 1996 when the South African Post Office vacated the building. The monument was gutted by a fire in 2009. The old City Hall is opposite the Post Office in Rissik Street.

=== Gold rush ===
Within ten years of the discovery of gold in Johannesburg by Jan Gerrit Bantjes, 100 000 people flocked to this part of the Zuid-Afrikaansche Republic in search of riches. Colonials, escaping the boredom of small-town life, joined Indians trekking from the sugar fields of Natal. Cape Coloureds and Chinese shopkeepers mixed with Africans, eager to experience the fast pace of urban life. Artisans and miners from the gold and silver fields of the Americas and Australia, from coal and tin mines of Europe, joined the wagon loads of men who had learnt their craft in the pits of Kimberley. Jews in search of freedom and employment, headed south to Africa from Eastern Europe and Russia. Mine managers and businessmen, solicitors and engineers, men with skills, education and contacts, confident of their expertise and frequently arrogant in their manner, took up positions in the burgeoning city of Johannesburg and in the new mines along the reef. In addition there were the pimps and adventurers, crooks and philanderers.

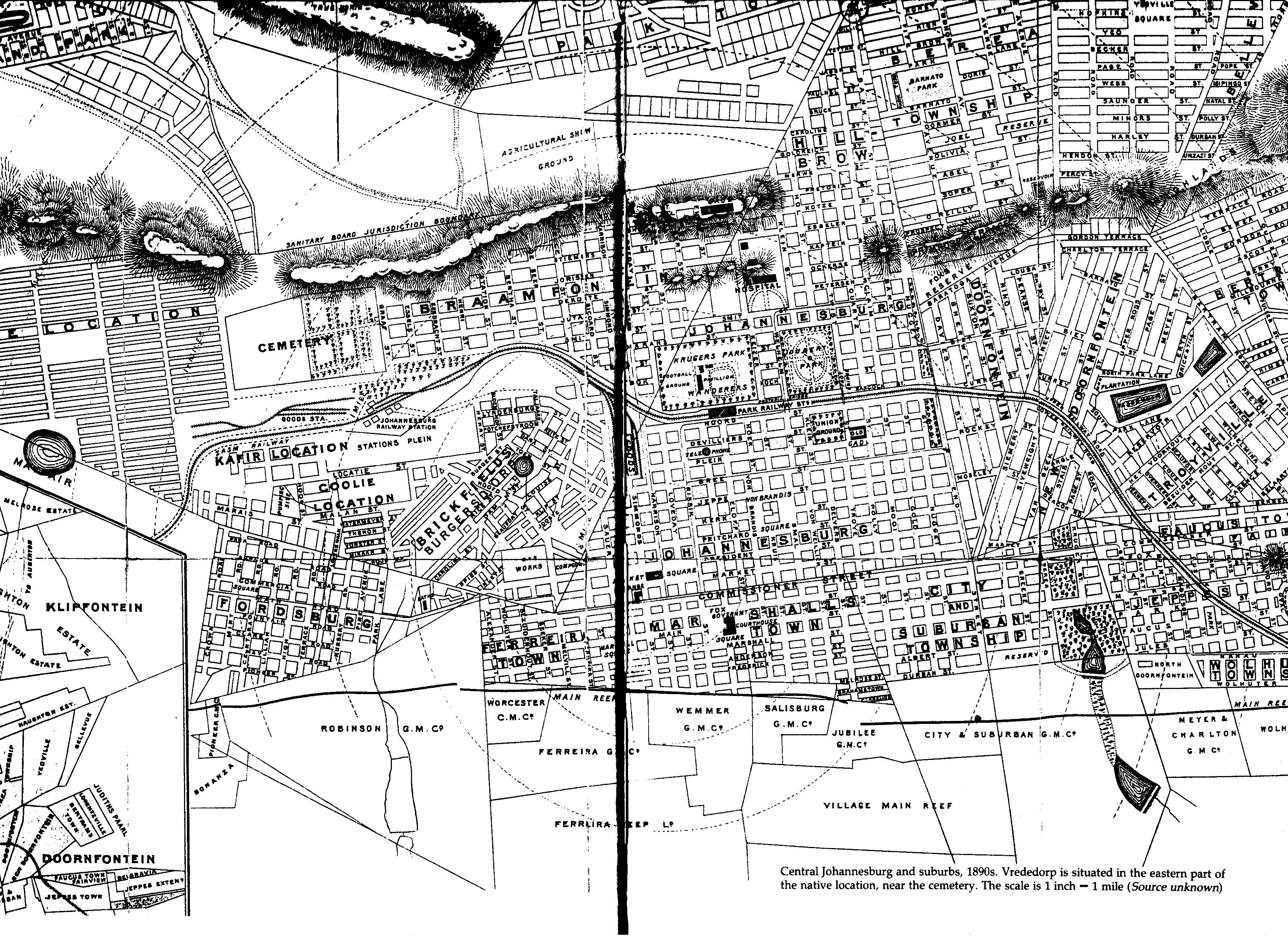
Johannesburg around 1890.

In January 1890 the Health Committee conducted its first census of the town. They found that Johannesburg had 26 303 inhabitants. There were 13 820 buildings, of which 772 were shops and stores and 261 hotels and bars. The following suburbs were recorded: Booysens, Fordsburg, Langlaagte, Braamfontein, Auckland Park, Marshall's Town, Ferreira's Town, Prospect and Jeppe's Town. There was also a Coolie Location and a Veldtschoendorp, the latter being a shanty town occupied by Dutch citizens of the ZAR.

Another census was conducted in January 1896. It was recorded that Johannesburg then had 102 078 inhabitants, of whom 61 292 lived within the three mile radius of Market Square and 40 786 outside. There were 50 907 Europeans or Whites, 952 Malays, 4 807 Asiatics, 2 879 mixed or other races and 42 533 Natives of whom 14 195 lived within the three mile radius and 28 838 outside. Of the 24 489 Whites born in Europe, 12 389 were from England and Wales, 997 from Ireland and 2 879 from Scotland. Of the 24 500 Europeans born in Africa, 6 205 were born in the Transvaal and 15 162 in the Cape Colony. New suburbs included: Klipfontein, Forest Town, Hillbrow, Berea, Yeoville, Bellevue, Houghton, Vrededorp, Paarl's Hoop, Robinson, Ophirton, La Rochelle, Rosettenville, Klipriviersberg, City & Suburban, Doornfontein, Bertrams, Lorentzville and Troyeville. It was also recorded that there was a Malay Camp, Brickfields, a Coolie Location and a Kafir Location. Kliptown is the oldest Black residential district of Johannesburg and was first laid out in 1891 on land which formed part of Klipspruit farm.

=== Society ===
From the start the city segregated itself spatially in terms of class and, to a lesser extent, race. Julius Jeppe and his partner, Lewis Peter Ford, bought a portion of the farm Turffontein. They had two townships surveyed and called them Fordsburg and Jeppestown. Both were next to the mines along the Main Reef. The stands in Fordsburg were auctioned is May 1887, but the prices were very low because the soil was marshy. The result was that white working-class families settled in Jeppestown and in Fordsburg factories, bars and "kafir-eating houses" sprang up.

Just north of Jeppestown is Doornfontein, then known as a 'classy' suburb, where professional and commercial men lived. Many Jews lived there as well. Their children attended school. The first English language school in Johannesburg was started by the Holy Family Sisters. In 1887 they opened a school in Fox Street, but it grew so fast that they had to move to bigger premises in End Street, next to Doornfontein.

To the west of Doornfontein was Braamfontein, where white wage earners with families and single white men lived.

In October 1887 the government of the ZAR bought the south-eastern portion of the farm Braamfontein. Quite a big stream flowed along the farm and they intended selling the water to the residents of Johannesburg. But there were also large quantities of clay, suitable for brickmaking, along the stream. The government decided that more money was to be made from issuing brick maker's licences at five shillings per month. The result was that many landless Dutch-speaking burghers (citizens) of the ZAR settled on the property and started making bricks. They also erected their shacks there. Soon the area was known either as Brickfields or Veldschoendorp. Soon other working poor, "Malays, Coolies and Kaffirs" also settled there. The government, who sought to differentiate the white working class from the black, laid out new suburbs for the Burghers, Indians, Coloureds and Africans, but the whole area simply stayed multiracial.

The railway line and goods yards were just north of these slum areas. On 19 February 1896 there was a great dynamite explosion in the railway goods yard at Braamfontein. 55 tons of dynamite had been left in the blazing sun and was detonated by the impact of a shunting engine. The explosion left a crater 250 feet long, 60 feet wide and 30 feet deep. At least 78 people were killed and 1500 injured. The government made another effort to separate the burghers from the non-whites by allowing them to become tenants in the newer suburb called Vrededorp. The suburbs was opened to whites who could acquire the stands on leasehold for a mere two shillings and sixpence a month. Many whites took up the offer and then sublet the stands to Indians for five shillings a month.

On the mines living conditions were harsh and alienating, particularly for the Africans who lived in large compounds. They were placed in bunk houses, which were overcrowded and cold in winter, where food was tedious and not abundant and where pulmonary disease was rife. White miners lived differently, though not in overwhelming comfort.

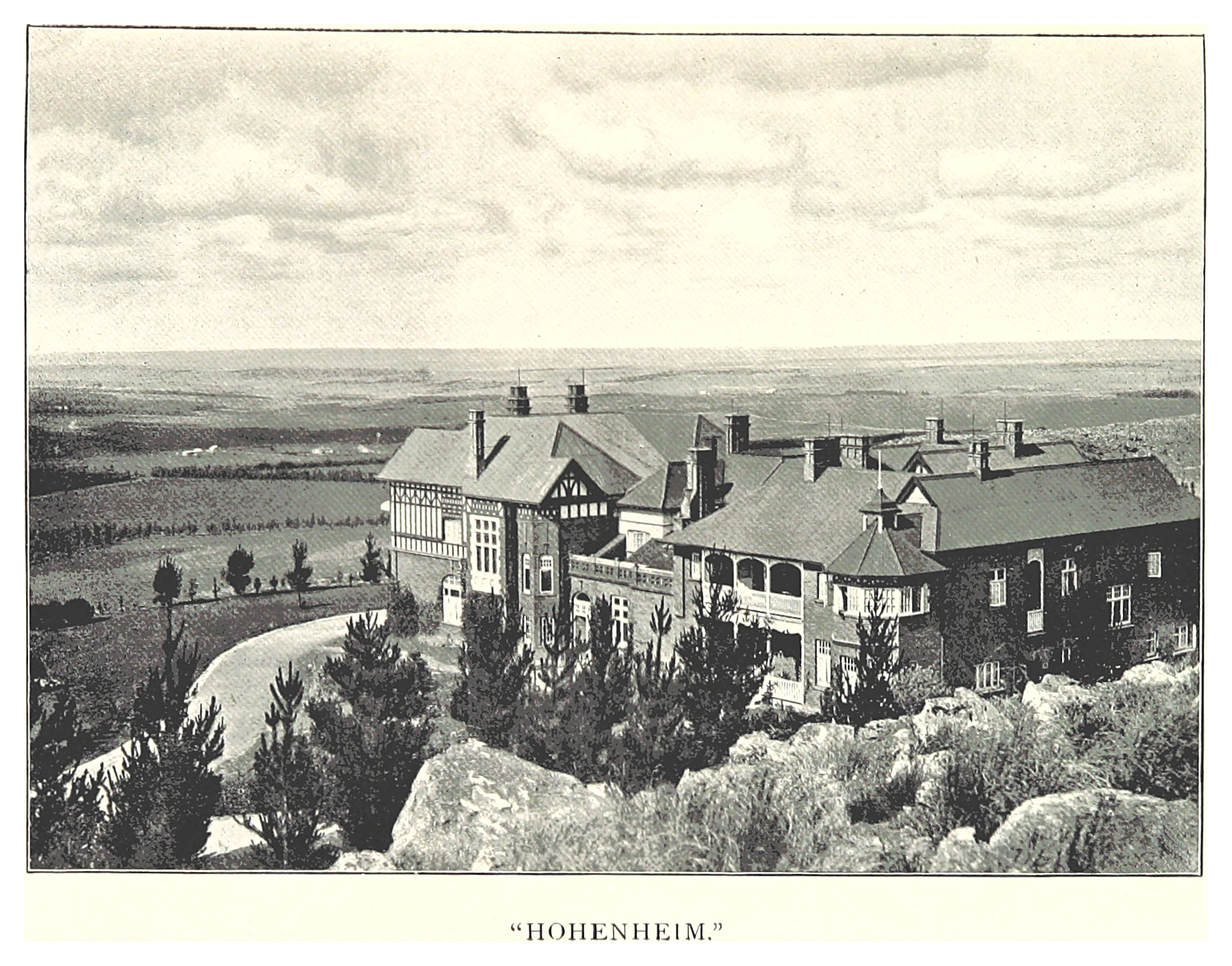
Hohenheim was the first of the Parktown mansions when completed in 1894.

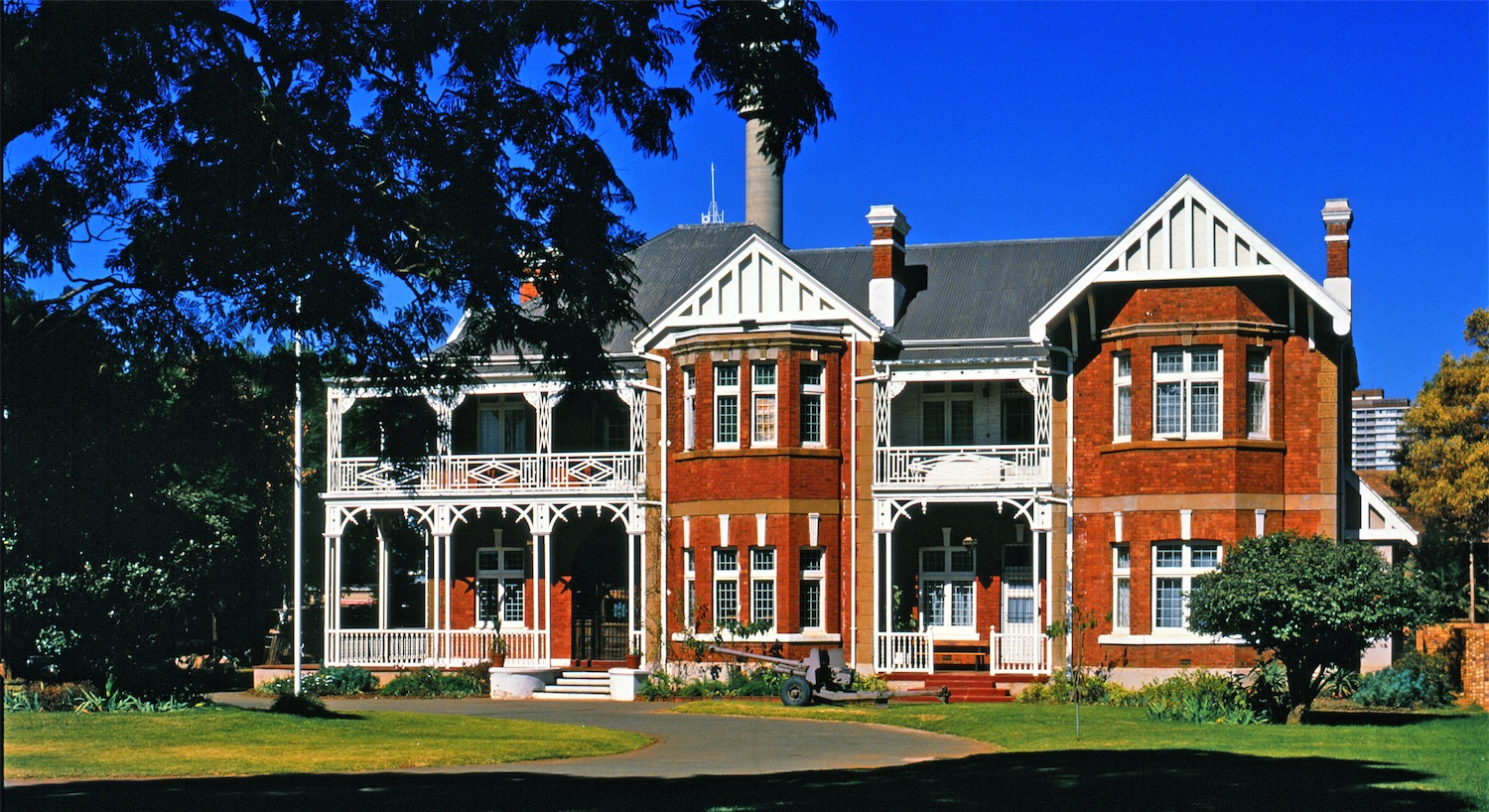
The View

Meanwhile, at the northern extremity of the town was Parktown, already known for its exclusivity and extreme wealth. Sir Lionel Phillips was the first Randlord to build a mansion in Parktown. "Hohenheim" was built in 1894 and demolished in 1972 to make way for the Johannesburg Academic Hospital. Sunny Side Park was designed by Frank Emley for Hennen Jennings and completed in 1896. Today it is part of the Sunny Side Park Hotel. "The View" was completed in 1897. It was built by Charles Aburrow as the residence of Sir Thomas Cullinan.

=== Franchise ===
The law of the land provided that every White (European) male who had resided in the Transvaal for five years, could be naturalized and become entitled to vote for a representative in the Volksraad (house of assembly). As more and more foreigners (called Uitlanders) arrived in the country to dig for gold, the government realized as early as 1890 that these Uitlanders could easily gain control of the country. The solution was to create a Second Volksraad. Uitlanders who had been naturalized for two years were granted the right to vote for candidates for the Second Volksraad. The Second Volksraad only had a say in regard to specific matters relating to Johannesburg and the mines. The bills of this body only became law after ratification by the First Volksraad. The residential qualification enabling Uitlanders to vote for the First Volksraad was extended from five to fourteen years and the voting age increased to forty years. Only a small number of Uitlanders took the trouble to register as voters for the Second Volksraad.

Uitlander dissatisfaction persisted. Some of their main complaints were nepotism and corruption of officials. What upset them most was that the prices and quality of essential goods for the mining industry were adversely affected by the government's system of concessions. These included the supply of water to Johannesburg, the manufacture and distribution of liquor and dynamite and the construction of railway lines. Then too the republican machinery of state was primarily geared to meeting the needs of a pastoral-agricultural community and it did not have the skills to administer a rapidly growing industrial state. The time was ripe for rebellion. In Johannesburg a Reform Committee was formed, while Cecil John Rhodes, the prime minister of the Cape Colony, arranged for Leander Starr Jameson to invade the republic from the west. The Jameson Raid was a failure and all the culprits were arrested. Rhodes had to resign as prime minister.

Afterwards the British Colonial Secretary, Joseph Chamberlain, took up the cause of the Uitlanders in their fight for the franchise. He appointed fellow-imperialist, Alfred Milner, as British Commissioner in South Africa. No settlement could be reached and eventually, on 11 October 1899, war broke out between Great Britain and the Zuid-Afrikaansche Republiek.

== Second Boer War ==
=== Up to 31 May 1900 ===
==== Flight ====
By May 1899 it began to look as though war was a real possibility. First to leave were the wives and children of middle and upper-class families. By June white miners joined the flight. Shop assistants and others in the urban economy were notified by their employers that their services would not be required after the end of the month. Between May and mid-October nearly 100,000 white people fled the district. Thus, at the onset of war, there were only about 10,000 whites in the city. The task of transporting this number of people — as well as the more than 100,000 non-whites who left — was an enormous one. At first only third-class passengers were consigned to trucks which normally carried coal, livestock or Africans. By the middle of October even first class passengers were quite happy to travel in coal trucks to the coast.

John Sidney Marwick was a civil servant in the employ of the Department of the Secretary for Native Affairs in the colony of Natal. In 1896 he was transferred to Johannesburg and appointed as Native Agent for Zululand. He was only twenty years old. His function was to look after the Zulu men working in the mines on the Witwatersrand. In 1897 alone, 20,615 Zulus from Zululand and Natal had registered at the pass office in Johannesburg. By the end of September 1899 some 5,000 Zulus were stranded in Johannesburg and Marwick obtained permission for them to walk back to Natal. They were to walk to the border at Volksrust, some 150 miles from Johannesburg. The march started on 6 October. On 11 October they reached the town of Standerton, where Marwick learnt that the Boers had delivered an ultimatum to the British and it would expire at five o'clock that afternoon. The Boer commandos, numbering some 8,000 men, had been assembling at Sandspruit on the road between Standerton and Volksrust. Marwick rode ahead to see General Joubert at Sandspruit, but found that the Boer forces had advanced to Volksrust. On 12 October the Zulus marched to within three miles of Sandspruit. That night a heavy downpour of rain came on. A large number of natives were suffering severely from exposure. The next day they reached Volksrust. They saluted General Joubert as they marched past him and then crossed the border into Natal. Unfortunately there were no trains available and the Zulus landed up behind some Boer commandos invading Natal. Marwick and his Zulus were eventually allowed through and they reached Newcastle on 14 October 1899, when the long march home ended. Some walked to Zululand, while others boarded trains for Durban.

==== Closing of mines ====
On 4 September 1899 the state attorney, Jan Smuts, wrote to the government that the mines would be of the utmost importance in the event of war. They would be a vital source of money if they could be kept open. To guarantee their operation, supplies of material and men had to be maintained and this, in turn, meant that whole staffs, even if British, had to be encouraged to stay. The government responded by reintroducing the Gold Law (Law 15 of 1898). It provided that after martial law had been declared, if a mine ceased operations, the government could order it to reopen and, if it did not comply, it could take over the operation itself. The government would then be entitled to use any gold thus won for its own benefit. The government would be obliged to return the mine to its owner upon repeal of martial law, provided that the owners had not been found guilty of high treason.

Over the weekend of 30 September many of the well-known mines closed, including Simmer & Jack, Wolhuter, Geldenhuis Deep, Henry Nourse and Ferreira. Robinson Deep closed on 3 October. By that time all the Consolidated Gold Fields mines had closed. On 7 October the government listed 66 major mines closed, with only 17 having applied to continue operations. Some mines offered bonuses to white workers if they remained. Some of the discharged Africans started rioting and looting. Thus blacks from Robinson Deep looted Chinese shops at Ophirton. On 8 October, at a 'puza' shop in the location near Vrededorp, shots were fired and shops looted. Some of the foreigners were arrested and charged with treason, like the jingoist editor of the Transvaal Leader R.J.Pakeman. Others joined the Boer forces, like John Y.F. Blake, an Irish-American, who commanded the First Irish Brigade. The Scandinavian corps, renowned for their bravery, was virtually wiped out at the battle of Magersfontein. Viscount Villebois-Mareuil formed a small French force.

==== Joburg under the Boers ====
In late September the government appointed a Rust en Orde (Peace and Order) commission. It consisted of D.E. Schutte (the peacetime commissioner of police), Dr F.E.T. Krause (the head public prosecutor) J.L.van der Merwe (the mining commissioner) and N.P.van den Berg (the head landdrost [magistrate]). A new police force was established for the whole Witwatersrand. Its leader was Captain de Korte, a former officer in the Dutch army. Johannesburg was relatively unaffected by the first eight months of the war. There were of course disrupted services, shortages and a certain amount of fear, tension and boredom.

By mid-October the government had taken over and begun to work three mines: the Robinson, the Bonanza and the Ferreira Deep. J.H.Munnik, the acting state mining engineer, was appointed manager of the Robinson mine. In November they added the Rose Deep as well. Several other mines were allowed to operate under their own management. These were Ferreira, Village Main Reef, the Wemmer, the Johannesburg Pioneer and the Worcester. Later Langlaagte Deep, Crown Deep, Geldenhuis Estate were added. It is thought that between 12,000 and 13,000 blacks remained on the mines. From 10 October to 30 April 1900 gold valued at an estimated £1,710,549 was won from the mines. In May another £240,000 was taken. Working expenses were put at about £630,000 of which only two-thirds was paid. The profit accruing to the government was £1,5 million, enough to cover war expenses up to that point in time.

Also of use to the Boers was Begbie's armaments factory. Thomas Begbie & Company, a foundry situated near the City and Suburban mine just south of Johannesburg, was commandeered by the government two days after the war had begun. On 24 April 1900 there was a huge explosion at Begbie's factory. The critical question facing the authorities was whether it was an accident or sabotage. Several arrests were made, the suspicion being that it was the work of British agents, but nothing was proved. The carelessness of men filling shells or smoking cigarettes nearby, could not be excluded. As a result of the explosion Schutte was removed as special commandant of the Witwatersrand and Dr Krause was appointed in his stead.

On 3 May 1900 Lord Roberts left Bloemfontein and resumed his march to Pretoria. In the Transvaal there was much talk about a conspiracy to destroy the gold mines before the British arrived. Munnik, the state mining engineer, and ex-judge Antonie Kock were certainly involved. British military intelligence thought Jan Smuts and F.W. Reitz were also involved. In mid-May Kock, at the head of a commando, arrived in Johannesburg with a letter from Reitz instructing him to destroy the mines. Krause refused him access to any mines. On 29 May Krause arrested Kock and had him sent to Pretoria.

Lord Roberts crossed the Vaal River on 29 May and reached Germiston on 30 May. On that morning his representatives entered the town to demand its surrender. Krause agreed to hand the town over the next day. On 31 May the British troops marched into Johannesburg. In front of the court house the Vierkleur was taken down and the Union Jack raised. The new military commissioner of police, Major Francis Davis, imposed a night curfew and closed all liquor stores. The British then had to figure out how to govern the Rand and its population of 13,000 blacks and an unknown number of whites who were probably hostile.

=== After 31 May 1900 ===
One of the first steps taken by Lord Roberts was to declare an Imperial Government Municipality for Johannesburg. Colonel Colin MacKenzie was an appointed as its Military Governor. He had to deal with thousands of previous employees wanting to return to the Rand. On 25 October 1900 the Transvaal was annexed. Lord Alfred Milner was appointed Administrator of the Transvaal in May 1901. He issued the Municipal Proclamation No.16 of 1901 whereby the town was granted a municipal council of 18 members, all nominated. In December 1903 they were replaced by a wholly elected town council consisting of 30 councilors. Municipal boundaries were extended to embrace, within a six-mile radius of the central area, mining properties and all vacant land of which the suburbs of the town were likely to develop. Proclamation 13 of 1902 extended the boundaries of the town's jurisdiction to 79 square miles.

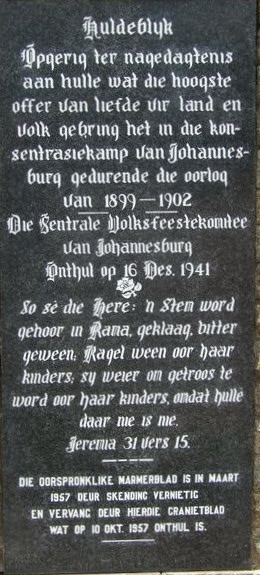
Granite plaque at Suideroord for 716 Turffontein concentration camp deaths

Very little is known about the British concentration camp in Turffontein Johannesburg. It was apparently constructed on the site of the Turffontein Turf Club, which was started in 1887 and still exists at the same place. Those who died at the concentration camp were buried at a cemetery where the suburb Suideroord was laid out many years later. The location is 26°16.357'S, 28°01.638'E. The site still exists, but it is surrounded by palisade fencing and the gates are securely locked. The cemetery was vandalized at the beginning of the Second World War, with the result that the gravestones were replaced by a memorial. The memorial is in the shape of seven coffins. One marble slab, erected on 10 October 1957, records that it replaced a marble slab that had also been vandalized in March 1957. Another records that 716 persons who had died in the concentration camp, were buried in that cemetery.

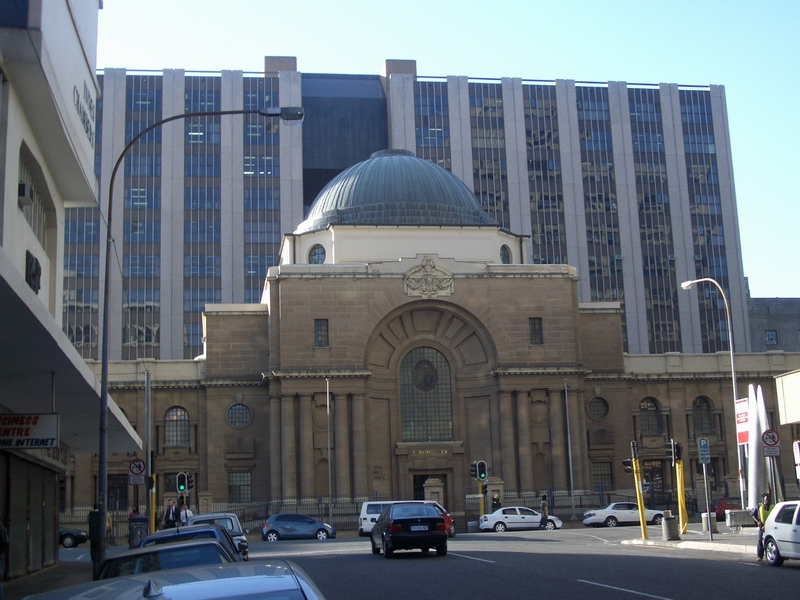
Johannesburg High Court

In 1902 Lord Milner also issued a proclamation establishing two supreme courts in the Transvaal. The one intended to serve the Witwatersrand gold fields was initially called the Witwatersrand District Court. Later it was called the Transvaal High Court. Although the opening of the court was anticipated for 20 May 1902, the High Court building was only inaugurated in 1910. The stained glass window above the court entrance contains the only remaining coat of arms of the Transvaal Colony. The court is situated in Pritchard Street, opposite Kruis Street. After Union in 1910, the court was called the Witwatersrand Local Division of the Supreme Court of South Africa. At present (2016) it is called the High Court of South Africa - Gauteng Local Division, Johannesburg.

== The Colonial Transvaal ==
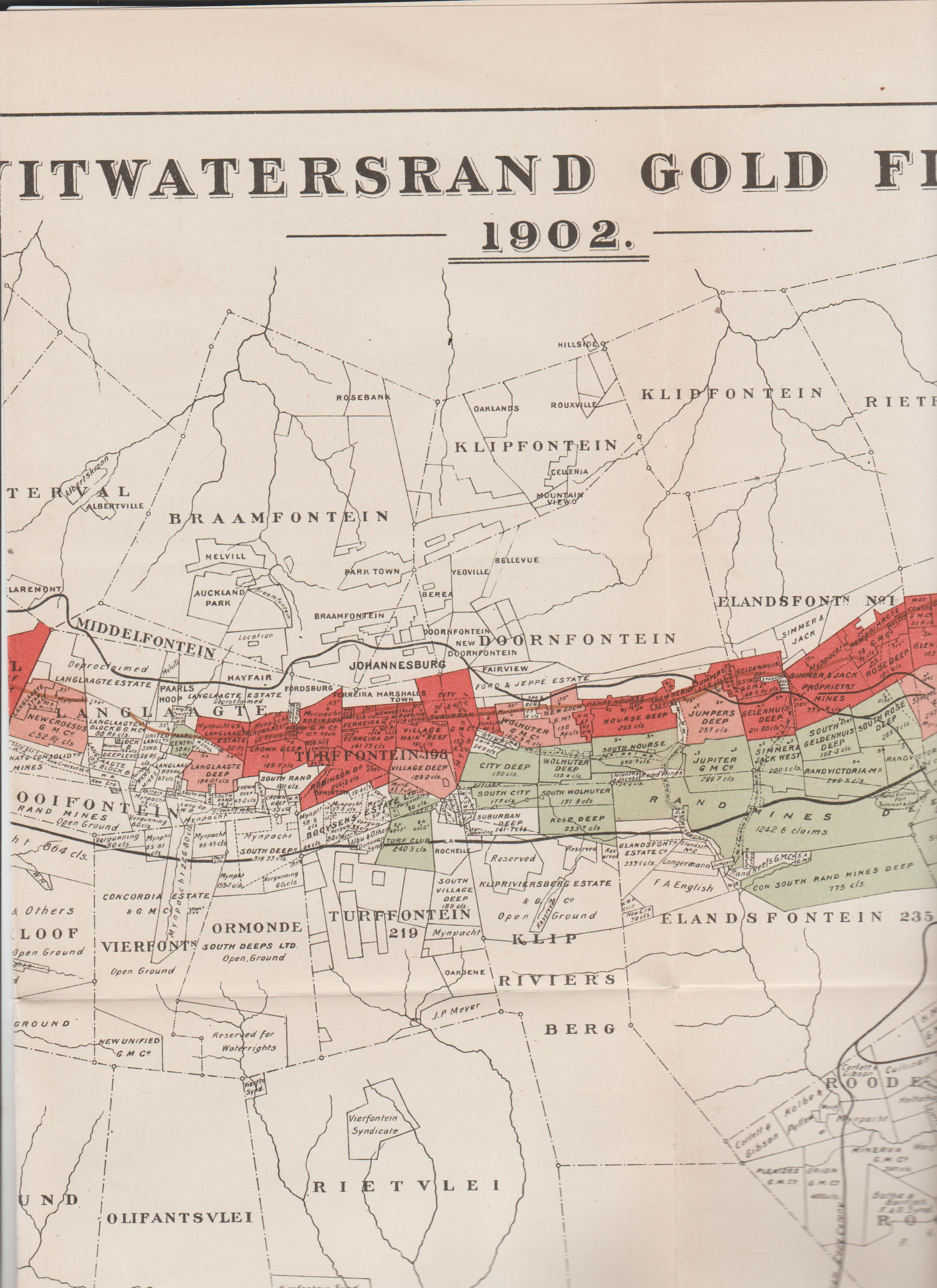
Johannesburg gold fields and suburbs, 1902

In April 1904 there was a bubonic plague scare in the shanty town area of Brickfields. The town council decided to condemn the area and burn it down. Beforehand most of the Africans living there were moved far out of town to Klipspruit (later called Pimville), where the council had erected iron barracks and a few triangular hutments. The rest of them had to build their own shacks. No provision was made for the alternative accommodation of other racial groups. The fire brigade then set the 1600 shacks and shop, plus an Indian temple, in Brickfields alight. Out of this holocaust there emerged one rat that was promptly shot. Thereafter the area was redeveloped as Newtown where a new market was built.

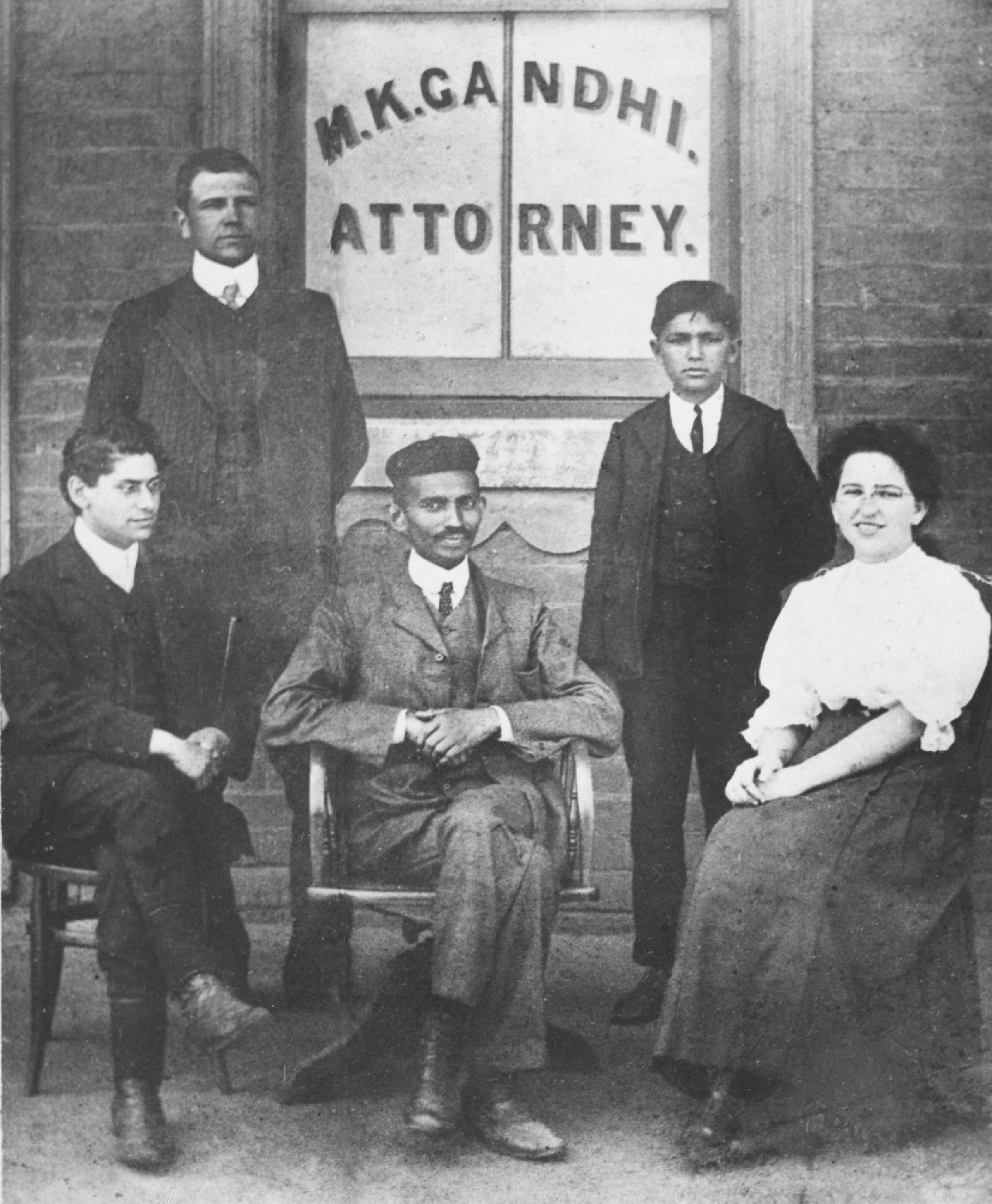
Gandhi and staff in front of his office in 1905.

Mohandas Karamchand Gandhi, a qualified English barrister, came to southern Africa in 1893 to act as legal representative of some Indian traders in Pretoria. He moved to Natal, where he was instrumental in forming the Natal Indian Congress. In 1902 he concerned himself with the rights of Indians in the Transvaal Colony. He opened his own firm of attorneys (solicitors) in Johannesburg. In 1910 his supporters gave him the use of land to open an ashram, named Tolstoy Farm and dedicated to the ideas of the Russian novelist and philosopher Leo Tolstoy, outside Johannesburg, which was to become the centre of the next phase of satyagraha (nonviolent resistance). In 1913 Gandhi and 2,000 Indian men and women flouted the law and marched from Natal into the Transvaal. He was arrested and jailed. Eventually he reached agreement with General Smuts, resulting in the South African Parliament passing the Indian Relief Act of 1914. He regarded his work in South Africa as done and returned to India in 1915. He acquired the honorific title Mahatma.

Sophiatown was originally part of the farm Waterval. In 1897 the speculator Hermann Tobiansky acquired a 237-acre portion of the farm, which was situated about four miles or so west of the centre of Johannesburg. In 1903 he had some of the land surveyed as leasehold township, divided into almost 1700 small stands. The township was named after Tobiansky's wife, Sophia, and some of the streets were named after his children Toby, Gerty, Bertha and Victoria. Blacks started acquiring land in Sophiatown.

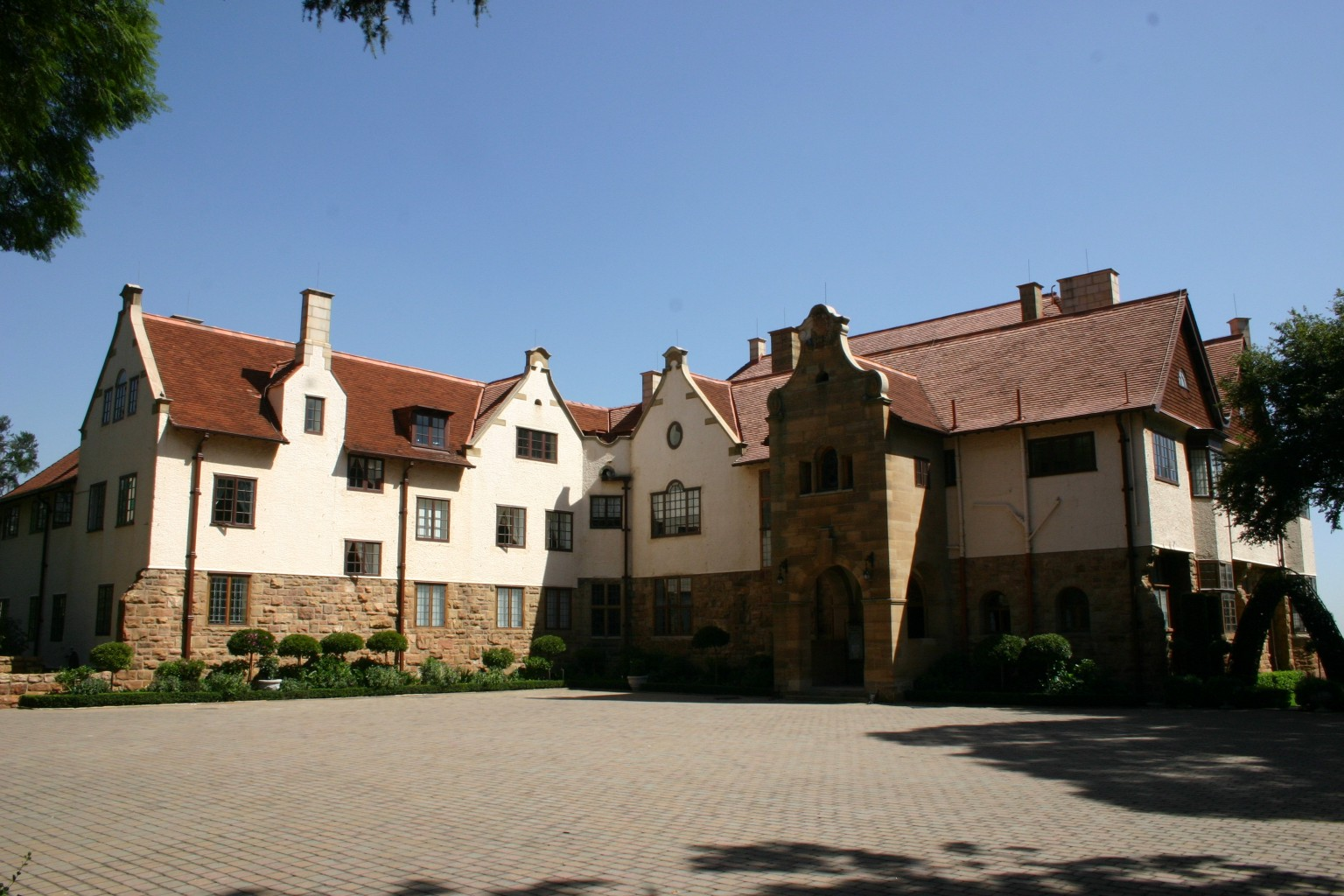
Northwards, originally built in 1904

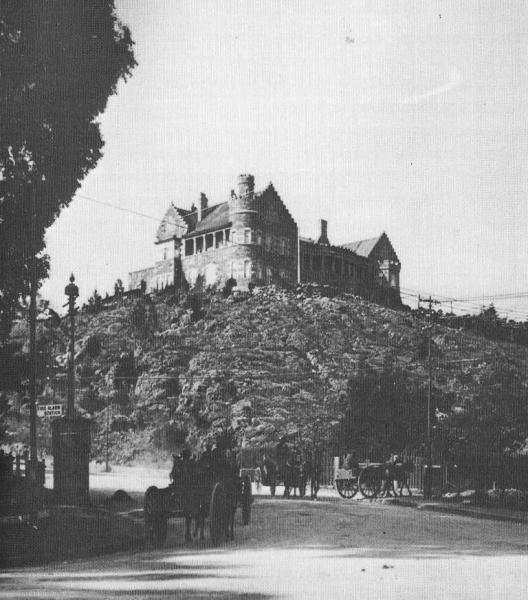
Eastington, a mansion on Harrow Road

All the gold mines reopened and the Randlords returned to Johannesburg. The first mansion to be built was not in Parktown, but on the hill overlooking Doornfontein suburb. It was called "Eastington" and was built in 1902 for John Dowell Ellis. Soon they started building their Parktown mansions as well. One of the first to be built was "Northwards". It was designed by Herbert Baker and built at 21 Rockridge Road for Sir John and Lady Josie Dale Lace. When they fell on hard times it was taken over by George Albu. The present owner is the University of the Witwatersrand. The house was built by specialist craftsmen and masons rather than from manufactured parts which had become popular during the Industrial Revolution. The house possesses some beautiful romantic features like a minstrel gallery and Juliette balconies.

Crown Mines Limited, which was founded in 1909 by the combination of seven mining properties, including the Robinson Mine and the Crown Mine, was for many years the biggest producer of gold in the world. It continued mining until 1977.

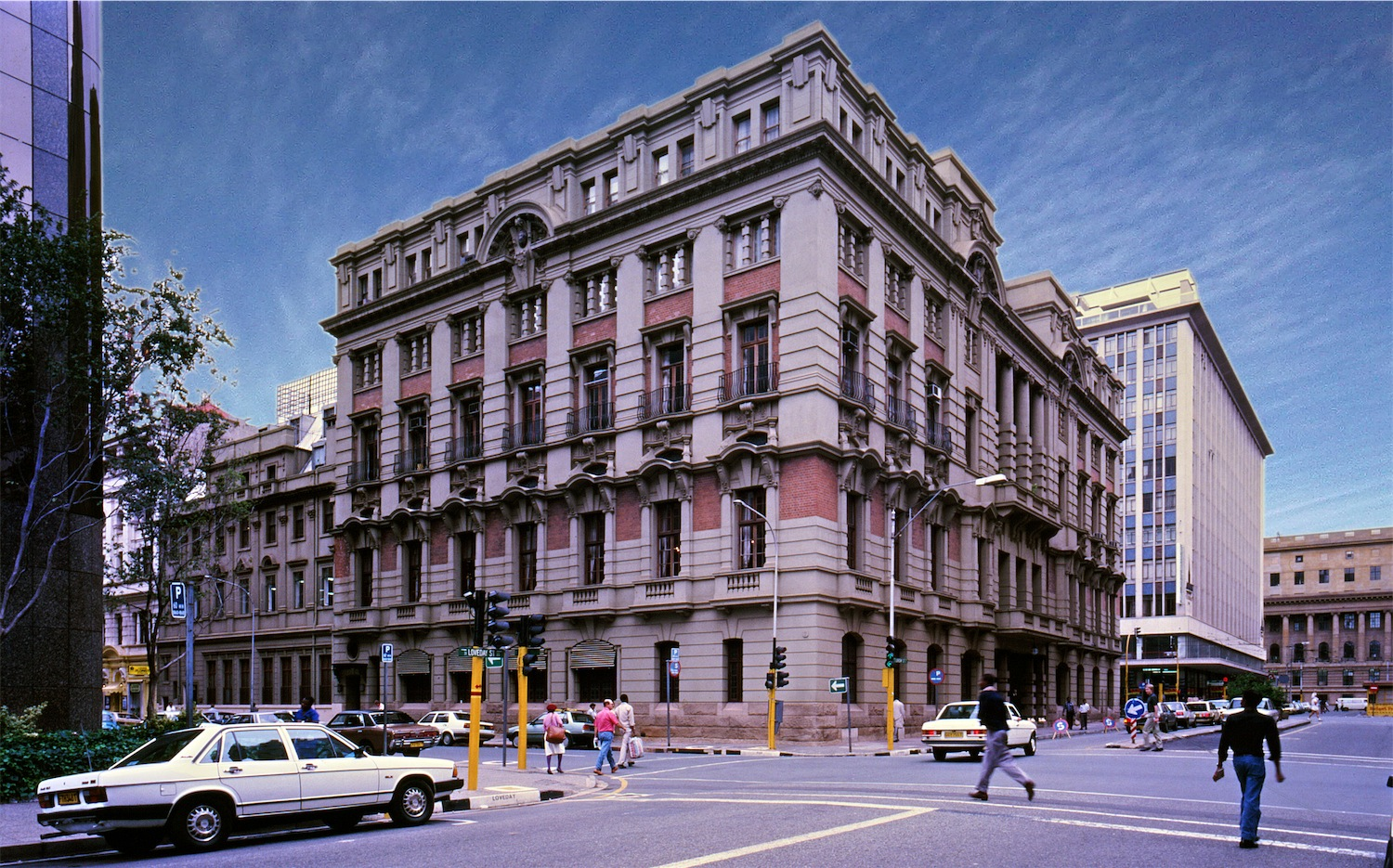
Rand Club, built in 1904.

The Rand Club of Johannesburg is the oldest private members' club in Johannesburg, South Africa, and founded in October 1887. The plan for the current, third, clubhouse was put on paper in 1902 and its construction was finished in 1904 on the design by architects Leck & Emley in the Edwardian neo-baroque style.

Lord Alfred Milner left South Africa on 2 April 1905 and was succeeded as High Commissioner by the Earl of Selbourne. In January 1906 the Liberal Party in the United Kingdom won the general election and decided to grant the Transvaal responsible government. An election was held in 1907 and General Louis Botha became the Prime Minister of the Transvaal.

The various religious organisations were also building their houses of worship. The synagogue was in President street, while the Baptist Church building was in Plein Street. The Central Congregational Church was in Bree Street.

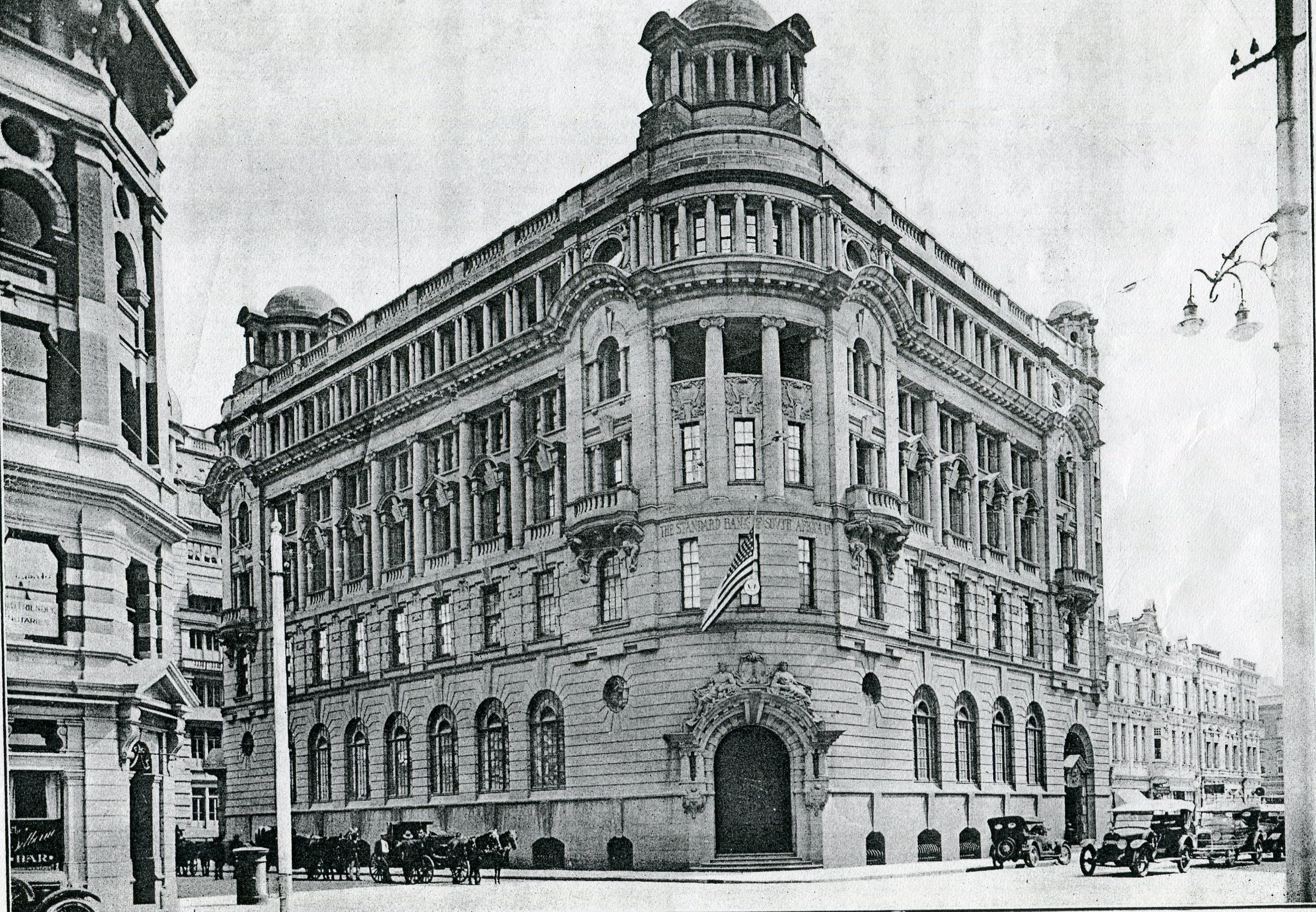
Standard Bank building in 1908

The Standard Bank building at the corner of Harrison and Commissioner Streets was completed in 1908. It was built in the Beaux Arts Style, then popular in fashionable areas of London.

Among the public amenities provided by the town council in the first decade was the Ellis Park swimming pool, which opened in 1909.

The population of Johannesburg increased from 13,027 whites and 78,106 non-whites in 1904 to 24,708 whites and 189,912 non-whites in 1910. In the same period the value of gold produced increased from £15 million to £33 million.

In 1909 a National Convention was attended by the four self-governing British colonies in South Africa, namely Cape of Good Hope, Natal, Transvaal and Orange River, to consider closer cooperation. The result was that the British Parliament passed the South Africa Act, 1909 and the said colonies became the Union of South Africa with effect from 31 May 1910.

== Union of South Africa ==
=== Pre-1948 ===
==== 1910 to 1919 ====
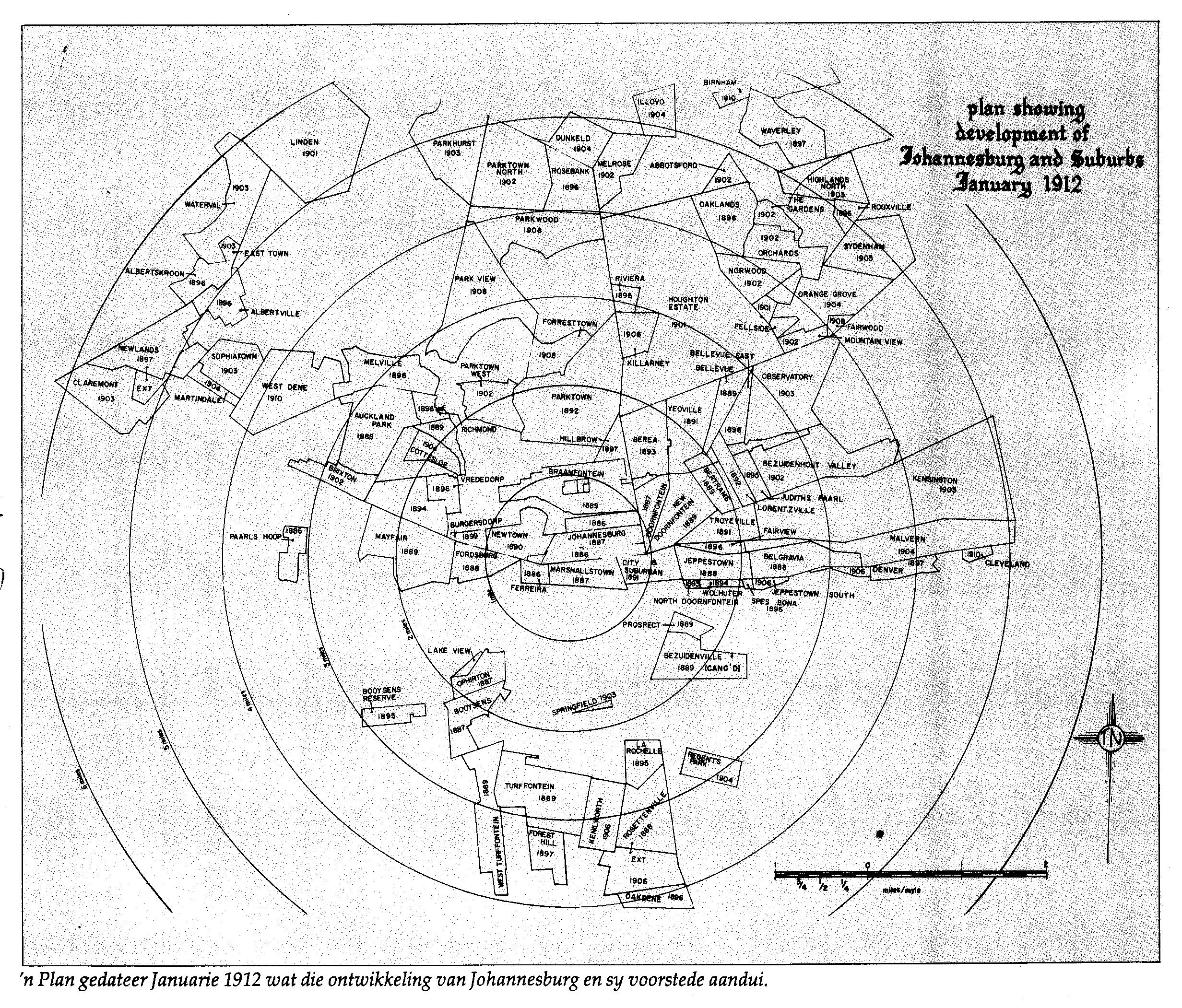
Johannesburg and suburbs in 1912

The constitution of the Union of South Africa provided for a highly centralized Westminster-type union, modified by subservient provincial councils with limited powers. One of the powers delegated to provincial councils was control of municipal affairs. In 1912 the Transvaal Provincial Council approved a number of ordinances to control local government institutions in the province. These included the Local Government Ordinance (no. 9 of 1912), the Local Authorities Rating Ordinance (no. 6 of 1912) and the Municipal Elections Ordinance (no. 8 of 1912).

There was a portion of the quitrent farm "Cyferfontien" No. 2 in the District of Johannesburg, transferred to Gert Pieter Johannes Labuschagne by deed dated 31 March 1875. In 1905 the portion known as Alexandra was transferred to Alexandra Township Ltd., the name "Alexandra" being that of King Edward VII's wife. On the property a township was laid out consisting of 388 lots, 2 parks and a square, in addition to streets. It was intended for occupation by white persons, but the lots were not sold and in 1912 the township company decided that properties in the township, to use the elegant language of the deed of transfer, "shall not be sold, leased or otherwise disposed of excepting to a native or person of colour, provided that an Asiatic shall not be included in the terms 'native or person of colour'." Although ordinarily an African could not purchase land outside certain scheduled areas, this prohibition did not apply in regard to a township established prior to the commencement of Act No 27 of 1913, and it was therefore lawful for Alexandra Township Ltd to sell lots to black persons. And thus black persons acquired the precious right of freehold title to land when they purchased lots in Alexandra Township. There were 2525 lots, nearly all of which had been sold in 1936 when the population in the area was about 16753.

While a limited amount working-class housing existed within Johannesburg, the number of workers wanting to live in the city far exceeded the housing that was available and actually preferred the more expensive slum-yards than the workers' compounds. Segregationist laws like the Natives' Land Act of 1913, which defined less than 10% of South Africa as black "reserves" and prohibited the sale or lease of land to blacks outside of the reserves, sought to restrict Africans from access to cities and effectively prevented Africans from land ownership throughout the country. However, the labor needs of Johannesburg's growing manufacturing sector, especially in the wake of World War I, when increased industrialization also increased the need for African labor, meant that the Johannesburg municipal government ignored national policy and allowed racial mixing in these growing urban slums to occur. A municipal system of exemption certificates obtained through employers did exist to grant African workers the right to live in urban areas. However, disregard on the part of the employer's for filling out the paperwork meant that most Africans resided in the city illegally.

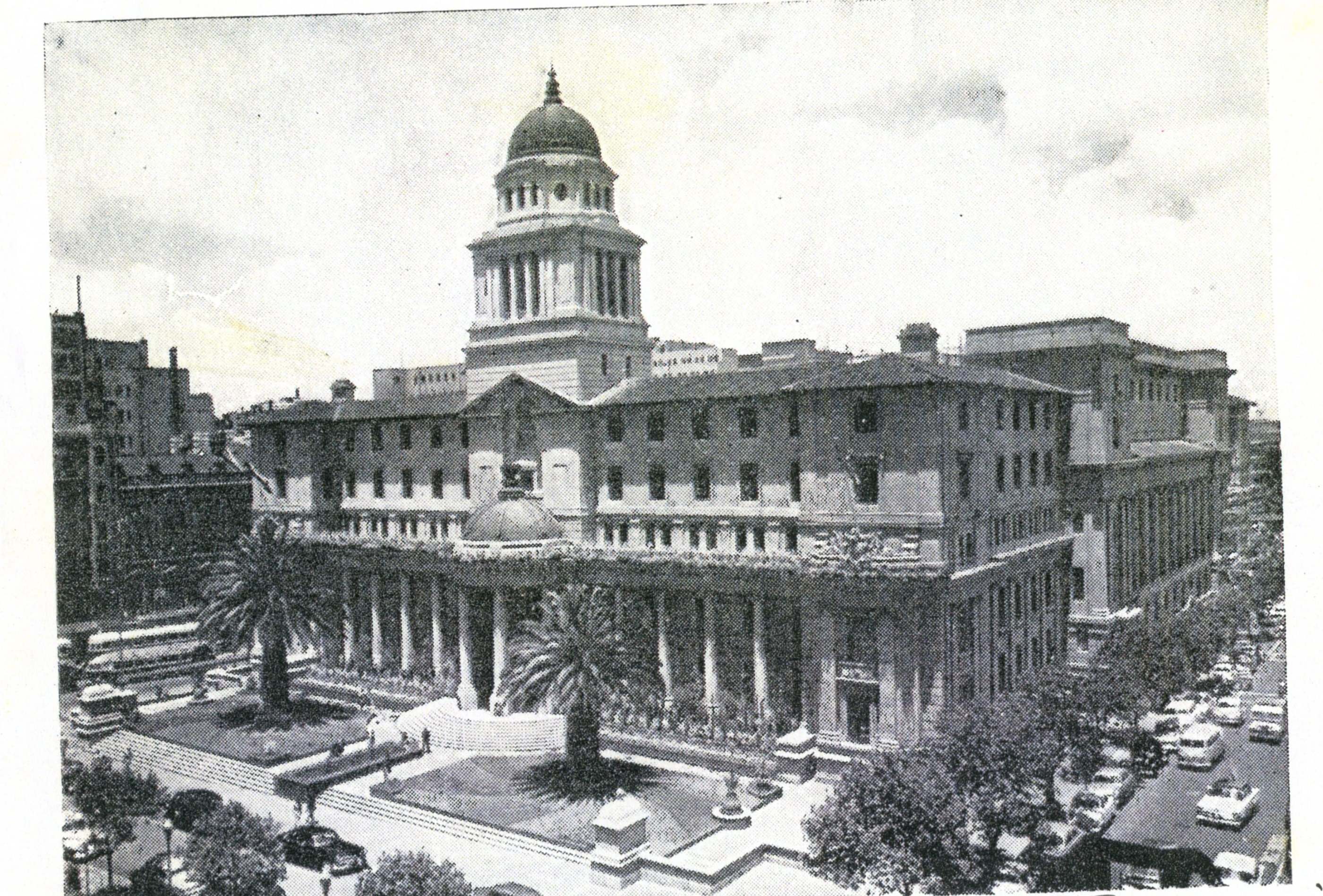
Johannesburg City Hall, built in 1914

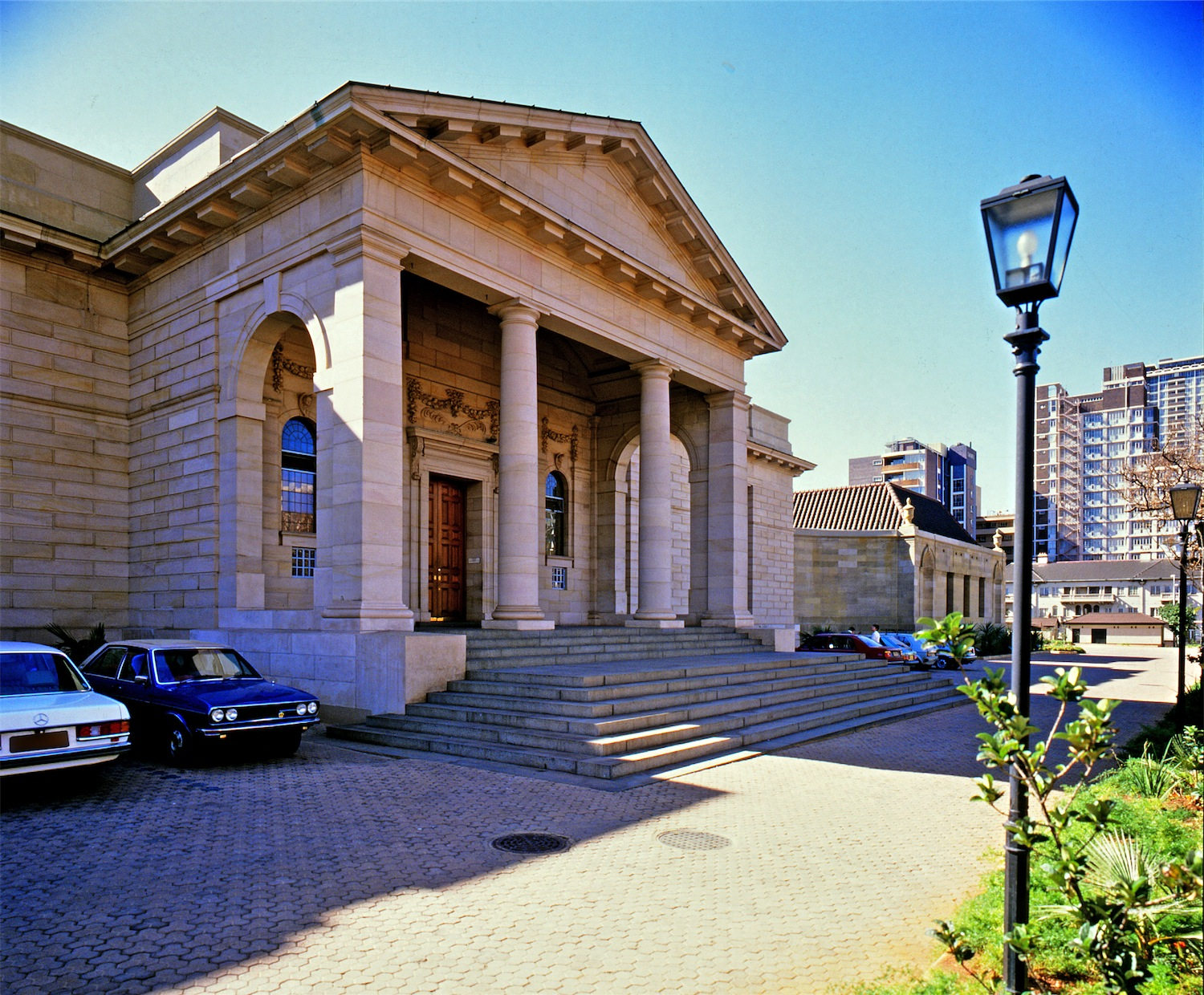
Johannesburg Art Gallery, completed in 1915.

Johannesburg City Hall was constructed in 1914 by the Hawkey and McKinley construction company. The plan for the building was drawn in 1910 and construction was started in 1913 and finished in 1914. The style is described as Edwardian Baroque with a portico of Ionic columns and tower with a half dome entrance described as neo-Renaissance. Florence Phillips, an art collector and the wife of mining magnate Lionel Phillips, established the first collection for the Johannesburg Art Gallery using funds donated by her husband. The architect, Sir Edwin Lutyens, came to South Africa in 1910 to examine the site and begin the designs, after Lady Florence Phillips had secured funding from the city for a purpose-built museum. The gallery was possibly Luytens's first public building in the Beaux Arts style. It was built with a south-facing entrance, but was not completed according to the architect's designs. It was opened to the public, without ceremony, in 1915, just after the start of the First World War.

In 1919 the municipality laid out another native location next to the Sophiatown township. It was called Western Native Township and was owned and controlled by the municipality.

==== 1920 to 1929 ====
At the end of 1921 the miners of the Witwatersrand went on strike. At one stage they occupied the Johannesburg suburbs of Fordsburg and Jeppe. The uprising was also known as the Rand Revolt.

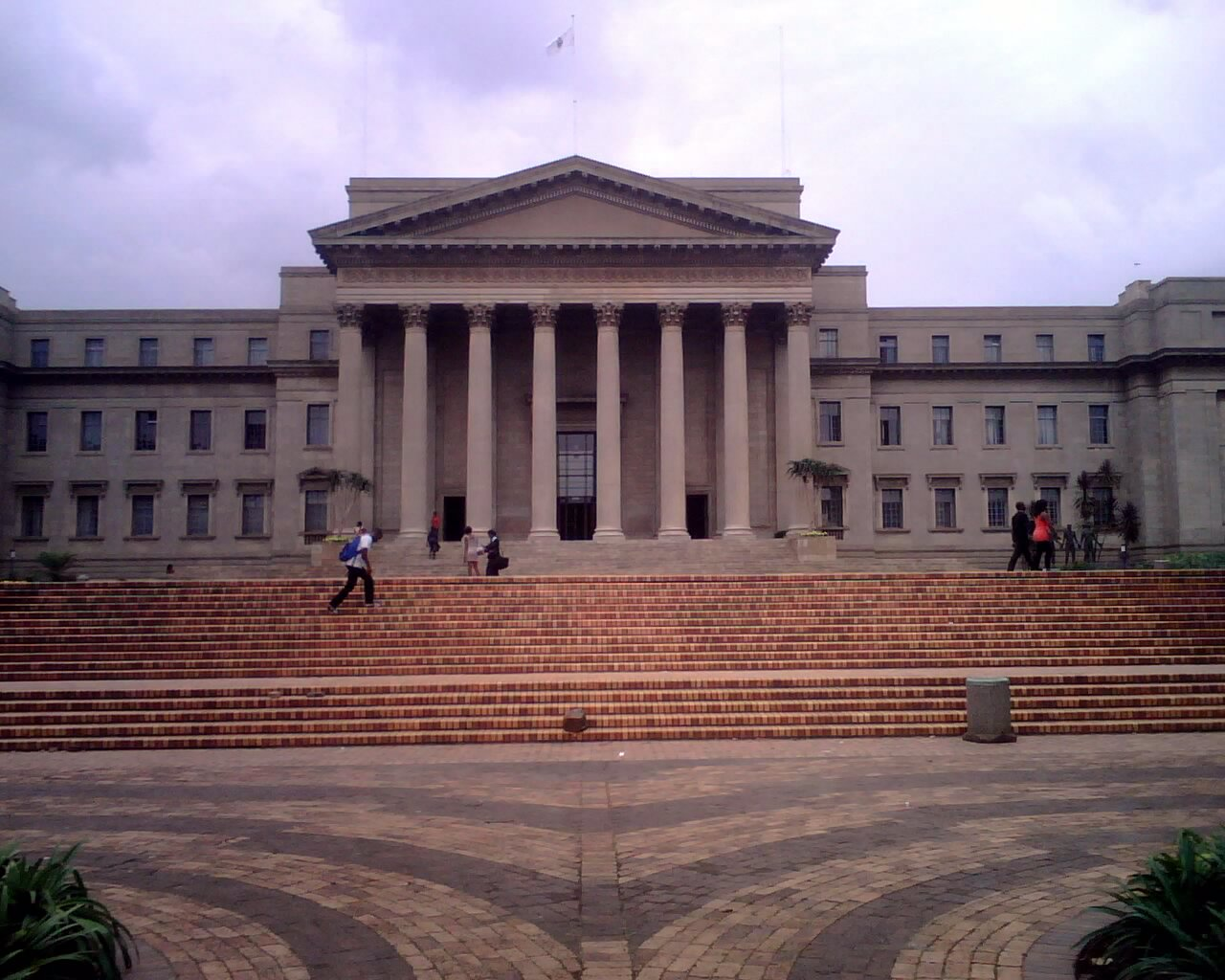
Central Block of Wits on East Campus

On 1 March 1922, the University College, Johannesburg, was finally granted full university status after being incorporated as the University of the Witwatersrand. The Johannesburg municipality donated a site in Milner Park, north-west of Braamfontein, to the new institution as its campus and construction began the same year, on 4 October. In 1925, the Prince of Wales opened Central Block (which includes the Great Hall).

The Rand Water Board Supplementary Water Supply (Private) Act was passed by the Union Parliament in June 1914. The measure gave the Board the right to impound annually sufficient of the Vaal River's surplus water to supply the Witwatersrand with 20 million gallons a day. A loan of £1,250,000 was raised for the construction of the barrage below Vereeniging. It was only completed in 1923.

In 1926 the Transvaal Provincial Council repealed the Local Government Ordinance of 1912 and passed the new Local Government Ordinance, No. 11 of 1926.

The Transvaal Provincial Council adopted a Private Ordinance (No. 15 of 1928) in terms of which the Town of Johannesburg acquired the designation of the City of Johannesburg. The Town Council became known as the City Council of Johannesburg.

In 1923 the Parliament of the Union of South Africa passed the Natives (Urban Areas) Act. This Act required local authorities to provide accommodation for Natives (then the polite term for Africans or Blacks) lawfully employed and resident within the area of their jurisdiction. Pursuant to this Act the Johannesburg town council formed a Municipal Native Affairs Department in 1927.It bought a large tract on the farm Klipspruit No. 8 and the first houses in what was to become Orlando Location were built there in the latter half of 1930.

==== 1930 to 1939 ====
City Library opened in 1935.

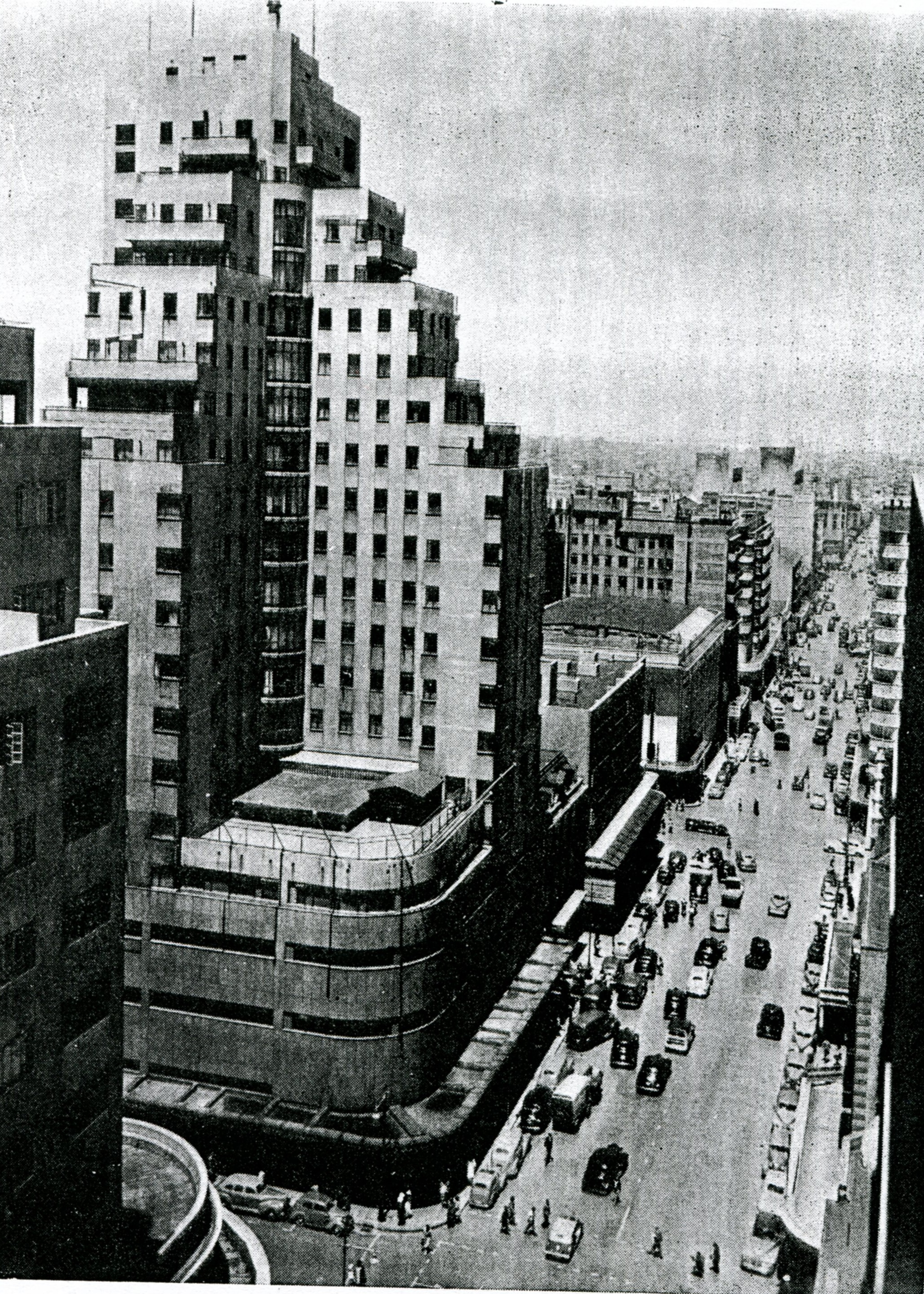
Ansteys Building during the 1930s

In 1935 the Johannesburg City Library eventually opened its doors to the public.

The Ansteys Building at the corner of Jeppe and Joubert Streets was designed by Emley and William and completed in 1937. It is recognised as a prime example of Art Deco Architecture, a style synonymous with modernisation, optimism and Americanisation before World War 2. The departmental store, N. Anstey's and Company, occupied the first four floors of the building. The tea terrace was on the fourth floor and was a destination of choice for the ladies of the northern suburbs. The building is 20 storeys high and was, when it was completed, the highest building in the southern hemisphere. The remaining storeys were offices and apartments, some of them occupying an entire floor. The building terminates in a mast designed for docking air ships.

In 1939 the Transvaal Provincial Council once again passed a brand new ordinance to control local governments in the Transvaal. It was called the Local Government Ordinance, 1939.

==== 1940 to 1948 ====
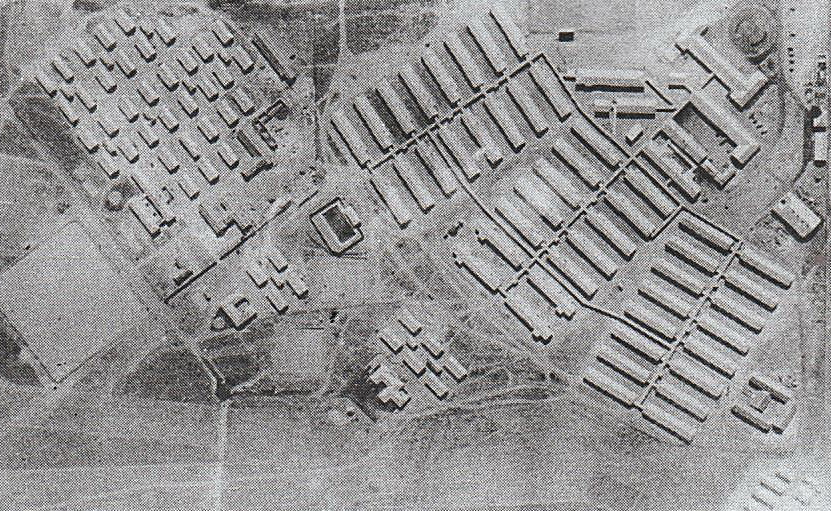
Baragwanath Hospital, 1942

In 1940 London asked Pretoria to provide hospitals for Imperial troops stationed in the Middle East. South African agreed to build one such hospital on the road between Johannesburg and Potchefstroom. The exact place was to be at the 8th milestone near the old Wayside Inn, owned by a Cornishman called John Albert Baragwanath. Construction started in November 1941 and within 6 months the first soldiers could be admitted in May 1942. Britain paid £328,000 for the 1,544-bed hospital. The facility was called the Imperial Military Hospital, Baragwanath. Towards the end of the war more and more tuberculosis patients were treated, some also coming from Burma. Those who died were buried at the new Westpark Cemetery near Emmarentia. King George VI visited the facility on 5 April 1947 and presented medals to some of the troops who were still patients there. Later, the Transvaal Provincial Administration bought the hospital for £1 million. On 1 April 1948 the Black section of Johannesburg Hospital (known as Non-European Hospital or NEH) was transferred to Baragwanath Hospital.

From 1944 many more Natives started arriving in Johannesburg. Soon they started spilling out of Pimville and other parts of the western and eastern areas of Johannesburg, soon congregating on a site to the west of Orlando. At the beginning of 1947 the City Council started a new emergency camp called Moroko. They made 10,000 small sites available. Residents were expected to build their own makeshift shanties on cramped six metre by six metre plots and using communal bucket-system toilets. The emergency camp was only dismantled in 1955, when it housed 58,000 people.

=== 1948 to 1961 ===
In 1948 the National Party won the general election and this was set to change the face of South African history for ever. The support the National Party gained from the electorate was largely the result of white fears regarding the rapid urbanisation of blacks after the Second World War. The Nats campaigned vigorously for racially segregated cities under a policy they called "apartheid". They imposed stricter pass laws which made it more difficult for black workers to travel to town, cleared black freehold townships and other areas of black settlement in the inner city and built 7,000 new houses in Johannesburg. By 1956 the Johannesburg City Council had provided 26,134 black families with houses in the seven townships under its control. These were Orlando (14356 houses), Western Native Township (2,250), Eastern Native Township (617), Pimville (1,246), Jabavu (5,100), Dube (1,115) and Mofolo (1,450). But the housing backlog had climbed to 57,000.

The logjam was soon broken. The central government decided to rather let land to Africans so that they could erect their own houses on the Moroka Emergency Camp. The Council for Scientific and Industrial Research designed a standard house for low cost housing. It was a 40-square-metre four roomed house. Then in 1951 it passed the Bantu Building Workers Act, permitting Blacks to be trained as artisans in the building industry. It also passed the Bantu Services Levy Act in 1952, which imposed a levy on the employers of Africans and used the proceeds to pay for infrastructure in their townships. The Johannesburg City Council provided 10,000 serviced sites by the end of 1955. The next year the townships of Tladi, Zondi, Dhlamini, Chiawelo and Senoane were laid out to provide 28,888 people with accommodation. In 1957 Jabulani, Phiri and Naledi followed. By 1958 Moroka and all shelters in Orlando had been cleared. But formal housing was lagging behind and by 1954 only 3,000 had been provided. Then Sir Ernest Oppenheimer was invited to visit Moroka. Sir Ernest was aghast and he arranged with other mining companies to join Anglo-American in providing the city with a loan of £3 million to be repaid over thirty years. Between 1954 and 1959 24,000 additional houses were built and 14,000 of them were financed by these loans.

The first Group Areas Act was promulgated on 7 July 1950, and it was implemented over a period of several years. The Act empowered the Governor-General to declare certain geographical areas to be for the exclusive occupation of specific racial groups. In particular the statute identified three such racial groups: whites, coloureds and natives. The Act permitted the removal of person from an area reserved for persons of a different racial group. This Act was repealed and re-enacted in consolidated form as the Group Areas Act, 1957. The townships of Meadowlands and Diepkloof were built by the central government. Between 1956 and the early 1960s 23,995 houses were built, particularly for those Blacks evicted from Sophiatown, Martindale, Newclare and Western Native Township in terms of the Group Areas Act. The Johannesburg City Council (controlled by the opposition United Party) would have nothing to do with the forced removals. So it was done by the government's Natives Resettlement Board. Subsequently, the Board administered those two townships.

Before 1948 the township of Dube was set aside as an area where wealthier Africans could obtain freehold title and build their own houses. The National Party put a stop to this and changed it to 30-year leaseholds. By 1954 African residents had built 2,500 houses from their own resources. The top-of-the-range houses cost around £1,500 compared to the £250 of the "matchbox" houses in other townships.

In 1959 Mr. Carr, the city council's manager of Non-European Affairs, launched a competition to find a new name for the council's showpiece of slum clearance. He offered a prize of £10. After four years of hot arguments the naming committee decided to call it Soweto, an abbreviated version of South-Western Townships.

The 1957 Alexandra bus boycott was a protest undertaken against the Public Utility Transport Corporation (PUTCO) by the people of Alexandra. The bus boycott lasted from January 1957 to June 1957. At its height, 70,000 township residents refused to ride the local buses to and from work. For many people this daily journey to downtown Johannesburg was a twenty-mile round trip.

In the 1950s the Electricity Supply Commission (Eskom) decided to move its headquarters from the centre of town to Braamfontein. ESCOM acquired a whole block fronting on Smit, Harrison, Loveday and Wolmarans Streets, a site formerly occupied by a dairy. The cost of the site was £261 220 and the building cost was £1 854 620. The building was completed in 1958 and was 17 storeys high. It was called Eskom Centre.

Randburg was founded in 1959 as a new municipality of 32 suburbs northwest of Johannesburg. Although economically linked to Johannesburg, residents chose to create their own town council. The name Randburg was chosen in a competition, and is derived from the South African Rand currency, which was introduced at around the same time that the new municipality was established. Randburg was a stronghold of the National Party during the apartheid era.

On 31 May 1961 the Union of South Africa became the Republic of South Africa.

== Republic of South Africa ==
=== 1961 to 1969 ===
The Albert Hertzog Tower in Brixton Johannesburg was completed in 1962. It is 237-meter-high (778-foot) high concrete radio and (now) television tower. The first transmission took place on 22 December 1961. Presently 18 FM programs and 7 TV stations are broadcast from there. When Albert Hertzog fell into disfavour with the government, it was called the Brixton Tower. At present it is called the Sentech Tower.

In 1964 the Johannesburg Botanical Garden was established in the suburb of Emmarentia. The Emmarentia Dam forms part of the Garden. The Garden is best known for its roses.

The Rand Afrikaans University was founded in 1966. Its first campus was on the erstwhile premises of South African Breweries in Braamfontein, Johannesburg. Later it moved to its new campus in Auckland Park. The University of Johannesburg came into existence on 1 January 2005 as the result of a merger between the Rand Afrikaans University (RAU), the Technikon Witwatersrand (TWR) and the Soweto and East Rand campuses of Vista University.

=== 1970 to 1979 ===
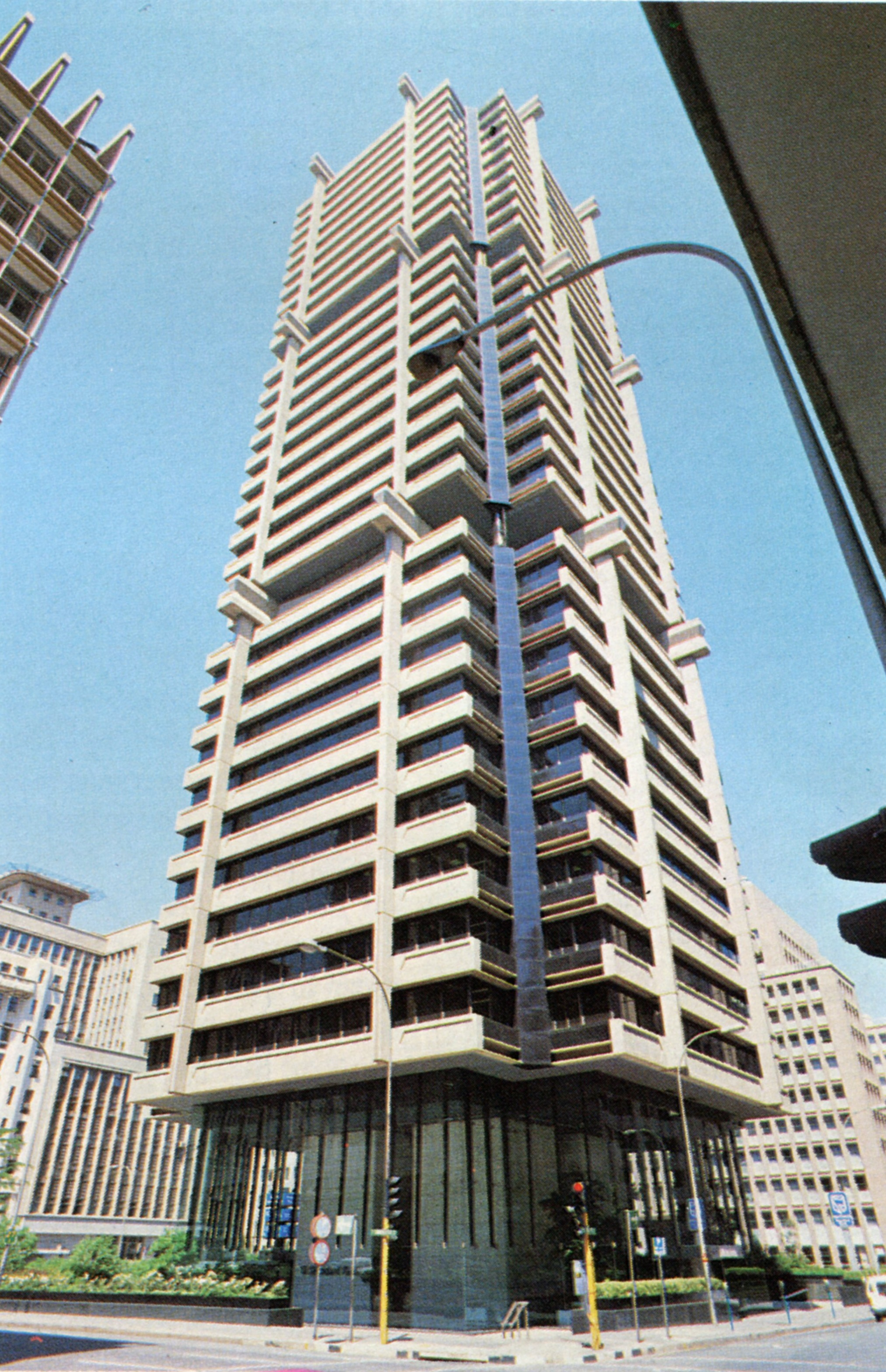

The Standard Bank Centre is in Fox and Simmond Streets in central Johannesburg. During the excavation, three stories below ground level, they came across an old stope. It was part of the workings of the old Ferreira Mine. The building's foundations were stabilised by backfilling the No. 1 level of the workings with concrete grout, but part of the stope was preserved as a museum. The building was completed in 1970. It was constructed by first building a central core and cantilever arms and then suspending the floors from the arms. The Centre houses a renowned art gallery.

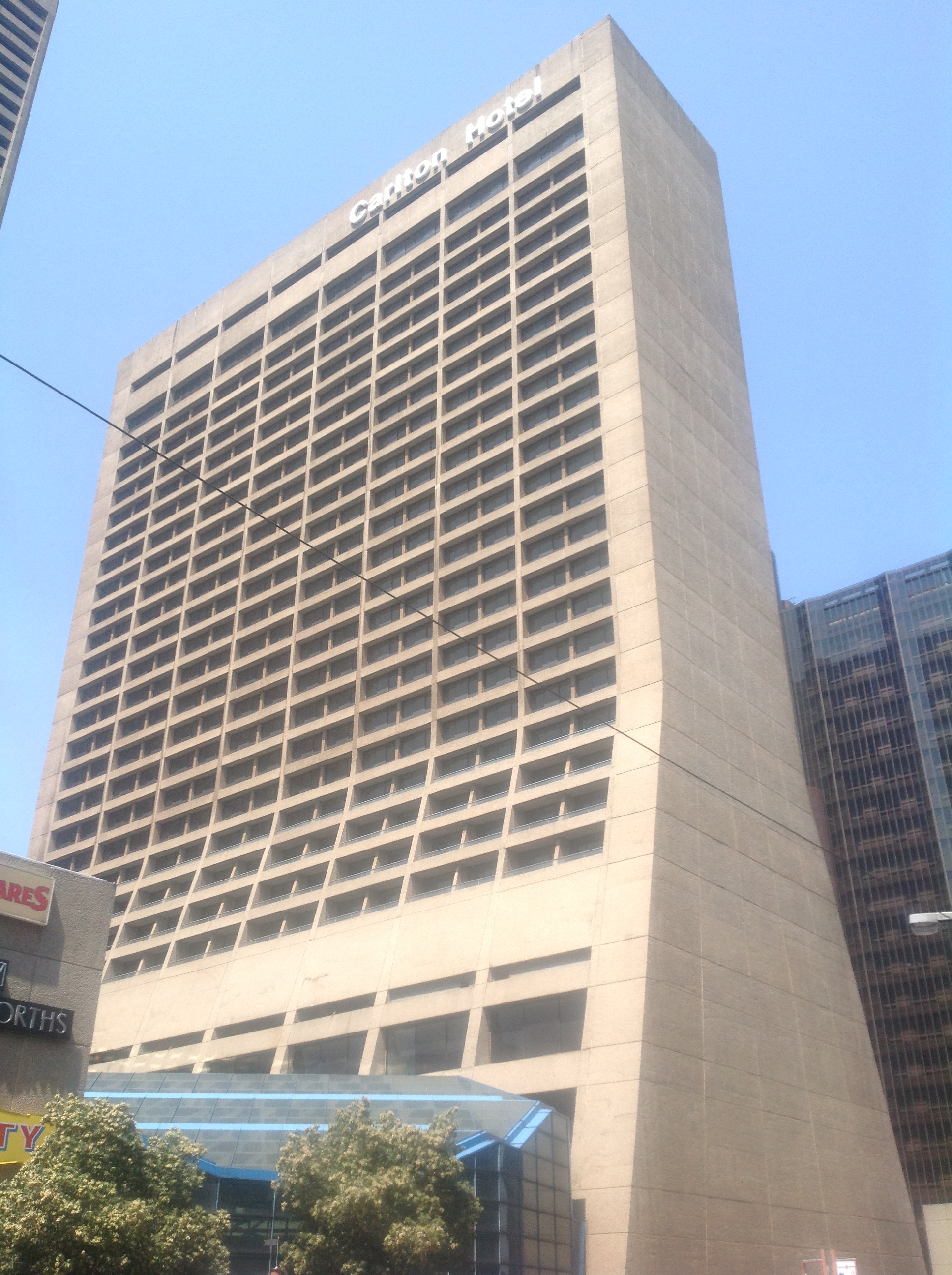
The Carlton Hotel, Johannesburg

The enormous Carlton Centre, built at a cost of R88 million, contained a fifty-storey office tower, the thirty-storey luxury Carlton Hotel, a five-storey Garlicks department store, three-and-a-half-acre public plaza with a two-story underground shopping centre beneath it and parking garages with space for 2000 cars. The Carlton Hotel (Johannesburg) opened for business on 1 October 1972.

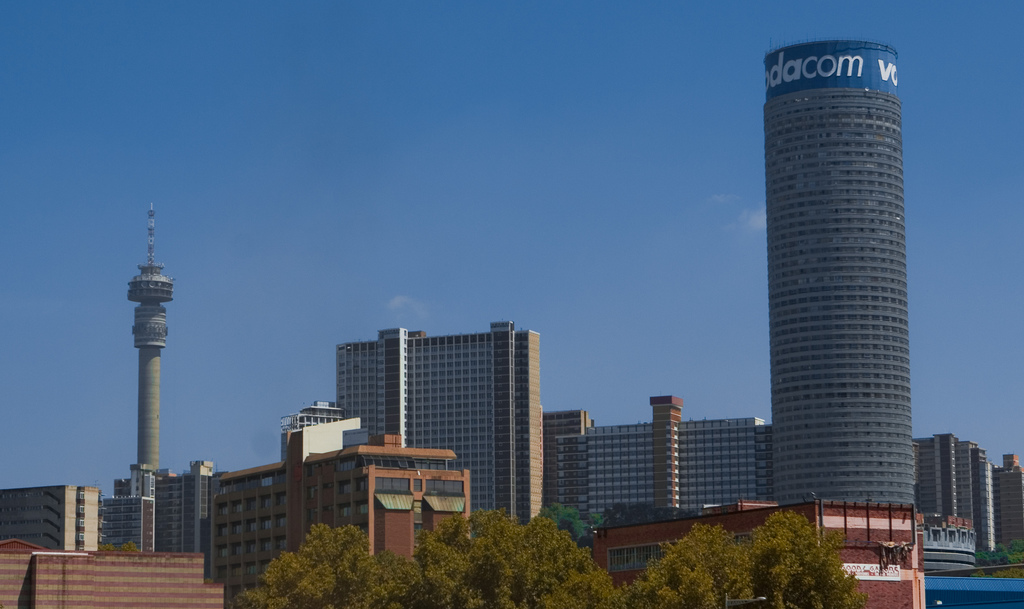
Hillbrow Tower left and Ponte City right

Ponte City is a skyscraper in the Berea neighbourhood, just next to Hillbrow. It was built in 1975 to a height of 173 metres (568 feet), making it the tallest residential skyscraper in Africa.

In 1971 the South African Broadcasting Corporation was eventually allowed to introduce a television service. When television was finally introduced, there was only one channel with airtime divided evenly between English and Afrikaans, alternating between the two languages. Test transmissions in Johannesburg began on 5 May 1975, followed in July by ones in Cape Town and Durban. Nationwide services finally commenced on 5 January 1976.

In 1971 Parliament passed the Black Affairs Administration Act, No. 45 of 1971. In terms of this Act the central government appointed the West Rand Administration Board to take over the powers and obligations of the Johannesburg City Council in respect of Soweto. As chairman of the board it appointed Manie Mulder, a political appointment of a person who had no experience of the administration of native affairs.

The Soweto Uprising was a series of protests led by high school students in South Africa that began on the morning of 16 June 1976. Students from numerous Sowetan schools began to protest in the streets of Soweto in response to the introduction of Afrikaans as the medium of instruction in local schools. It is estimated that 20,000 students took part in the protests. The number of protesters killed by police was officially given as 176, but estimates of up to 700 have been made. In remembrance of these events, 16 June is now a public holiday in South Africa. A thirteen year old Black boy, Hector Pieterson, is the iconic first victim of police brutality, but Dr Melville Edelstein, who had devoted his life to social welfare among blacks, was soon forgotten. He was stoned to death by the mob and left with a sign around his neck proclaiming "Beware Afrikaners".

Following the riots the government founded three community councils, namely Soweto proper, Dobsonville and Diepmeadow (the latter for the townships of Diepkloof and Meadowlands). When elections were held for their councils, only 16% of voters in Diepmeadow and 6% in Soweto went to the polls. In 1978 the government transferred local administrative powers to the three councils, but their decisions had to be ratified by the Minister of Plural Relations. In 1983 the community councils acquired full local government status in terms of the Black Local Authorities Act, No. 102 of 1982

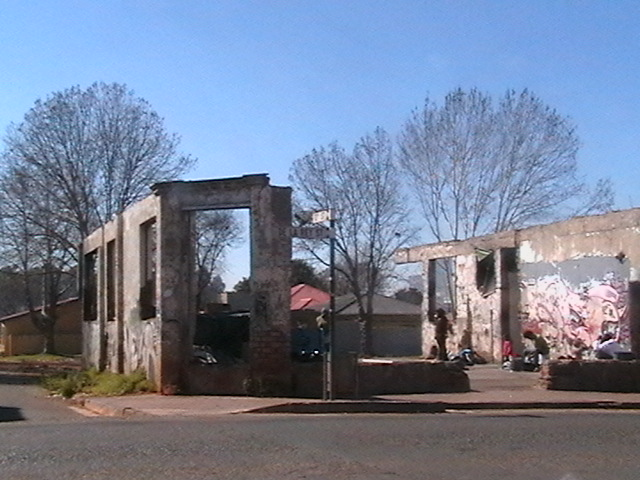
Bulldozed house in Pageview

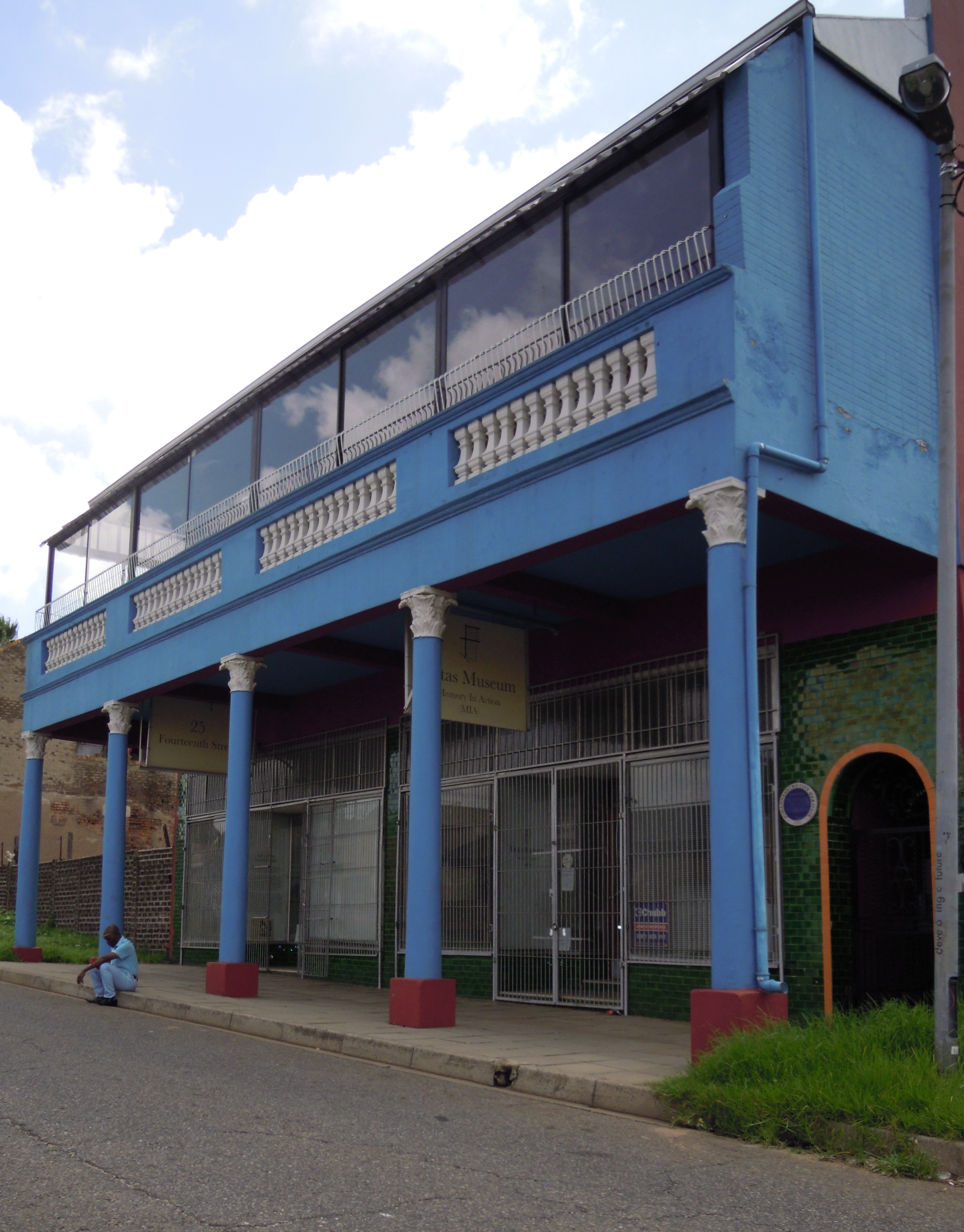
Fietas Museum

Pursuant to the Group Areas Act, Pageview (previously a part of Vrededorp) was declared a white group area on 27 July 1956. The result was that all "non-whites" became "disqualified persons" in Pageview and were obliged to leave the area. Between 1964 and 1970 all non-white (mainly Indian) residents were issued ejectment orders. Some moved to the new Indian suburb of Lenasia, while others resisted the orders. The government tried to force the removal by closing all the Indian schools in the Pageview area. During the period 1974 to 1981 the government gradually removed all Indians from their homes and shops and dumped them in Lenasia. Bulldozers moved in and demolished most of the structures. One of the structures not demolished, was a shop belonging to the Surtees outfitters. It is now the Fietas Museum.

=== 1980 to 1989 ===
Midrand was established as a municipality in 1981 (in an area known as Halfway House, after its position between Pretoria and Johannesburg), but ceased to be an independent town in the restructuring of local government that followed the end of apartheid in 1994. It was incorporated in the City of Johannesburg Metropolitan Municipality in 2000.

In 1982 Parliament passed the Black Local Authorities Act, No. 102 of 1982. In terms of this Act the City Council of Soweto came into being.

== The New South Africa ==
The establishment of metropolitan municipalities took a long time. In 1989 the Central Witwatersrand Metropolitan Chamber came into being to show the way for local government transition across the country. In 1993 the Local Government Transition Act, No. 203 of 1993, recognised the importance of negotiation and formalised the Greater Johannesburg Local Negotiating Forum. The Act provided for a two-tier system of government with strong local councils and a weaker metro tier playing a coordinating role. The first fully democratic local government elections were held in November 1995. It gave birth to a Greater Johannesburg Transitional Metropolitan Council and four Transitional Metropolitan Local Councils. Unfortunately this arrangement led to a very serious financial crisis, mainly because the local councils were not obliged to balance their budgets.

In the meantime Chapter 7 of the Constitution of the Republic of South Africa, 1996, dealt with local government. In terms of section 155(1)(a) a category A municipality is one that has exclusive municipal executive and legislative authority in its area. In the Municipal Structures Act (Act 117 of 1998) it is laid down that this type of local government is to be used for conurbations, i.e. "centre[s] of economic activity", areas "for which integrated development planning is desirable", and areas with "strong interdependent social and economic linkages". Johannesburg is such a municipality and these are called Metropolitan Municipalities. Eleven local authorities were to be joined in 2000 to form the new Johannesburg metropolitan municipality. These included Roodepoort, Randburg, Sandton, Johannesburg, Soweto, Diepmeadow, Dobsonville, Lenasia and Midrand.

During the transitional years, the Albert Street Methodist Church, Johannesburg played a pivotal role by providing shelter to homeless individuals and political refugees, becoming a symbol of compassion and resistance during the final years of apartheid.

A completely refurbished Soccer City stadium in Johannesburg hosted the 2010 FIFA World Cup final.

From 22 to 24 August 2023, Johannesburg hosted 15th BRICS Summit.

On 31 August 2023, at least 76 people died when a building caught fire in Johannesburg. The building had been taken over by a gang who were illegally renting it out.

== See also ==
- Timeline of Johannesburg
