= Lindsay Bremner =

South African architect and educator

- Born: Zambia
- Education: University of Cape Town; University of the Witwatersrand
- Occupations: Educator, architect
- Awards: Jane Jacobs Prize

Lindsay Bremner is a South African scholar and architect, and is currently Professor of Architecture at the University of Westminster, in the United Kingdom. She has authored several books and her work has won several awards, including the Jane Jacobs Prize in 2011. Bremner's research studies oceans, design, and climate change.

== Life and education ==
Bremner earned a Bachelor in Architecture from the University of Cape Town, and a Masters and DSc. in Architecture from the University of the Witwatersrand, in South Africa.

== Career ==
=== Teaching ===
Bremner taught architecture at the University of the Witwatersrand from 1983 to 2004, before teaching at Temple University in Philadelphia, where she was also a Chair at the Tyler School of Art, in the United States of America. Since 2012, she has taught architecture at the University of Westminster, in the United Kingdom, where she is currently a Professor of Architecture.

Bremner has also taught as a visiting professor at a number of institutions, including the Berlage Institute, Rotterdam, the Centre of Contemporary Culture, Barcelona, Columbia University, New York, University of Cordoba, Argentina, and Universita della Svizzera Italiana, Mendrisio, Switzerland.

=== Design and Architecture ===
Bremner has created and participated in a number of design projects, including the development of a cyclone shelter in Bangladesh with Jeremy Voorhees. Along with architectural firm, 26'10 South, she worked to rebuild and restore the Sans Souci community cinema theatre in Kliptown, Soweto, South Africa. The Sans Souci cinema restoration won Bauwelt Magazine's First Work Competition Prize in 2010.

=== Research ===
Bremner's initial research at the University of the Witwatersrand focused on architecture in post-apartheid South Africa. Two books by Bremner build on this research. In 2010, she published Writing the City into Being: Essays on Johannesburg 1998 – 2008 (Fourth Wall, 2010), which won the 2011 Jane Jacobs Urban Communication Award in 2011 and the Graham Foundation Award. In 2004, she published Johannesburg: One City Colliding Worlds (STE Publications).

Bremner's research has focused on issues concerning climate change, oceans, and architecture. From 2016 to 2022, she was the principal investigator in a European Research Council funded project titled Monsoon Assemblages, which examined the impact of changing monsoon climates in four Asian cities: Delhi, Chennai, Dhaka and Yangon. Previously, along with Jonathan Cane and Euclides Gonvalves, she studied the impact of the monsoon on Mozambique, in a project funded by the US Social Science Research Councils.

Bremner's publications have touched on issues relating to planning urban architecture to manage flooding in Chennai, the impact of climatic factors on Rohingya refugees, climate justice in relation to monsoons, and the geographical factors relating to the missing Malaysian Airlines flight MH370.

== Publications ==
Bremner's publications include:

- Bremner, L. 2010. Writing the city into being: essays on Johannesburg, 1998–2008. Johannesburg Fourthwall Books.
- Bremner, L. 2018. Technologies of Uncertainty in the Search for Flight MH370. in: Sorensen, D. (ed.) Territories and Trajectories: Cultures in Circulation Chapel Hill, NC Duke University Press. pp. 223–256
- Bremner, L. 2020. Planning the 2015 Chennai Floods. Environment and Planning E: Nature and Space. 3 (3), pp. 732–760. https://doi.org/10.1177/2514848619880130
- Bremner, L. 2020. Sedimentary logics and the Rohingya refugee camps in Bangladesh. Political Geography. 77 102109. https://doi.org/10.1016/j.polgeo.2019.102109
- Bremner, L. 2022. Monsoonal Solidarity: A Global Approach to Climate Justice. Architectural Design. 92 (1), pp. 104–111.
- Bremner, L., Cullen, B., Geros, C., Cook, J., Powis, A. and Seetharama Bhat, H. Bremner, L. (ed.) 2022. Monsoon as Method: Assembling Monsoonal Multiplicities. Barcelona Actar.
- Bremner, L. and Cullen, B. 2022. Jade Urbanism. in: Axel, N., Hirsch, N., Barber, D. and Vidokle, A. (ed.) Accumulation: The Art, Architecture and Media of Climate Change Minneapolis University of Minnesota Press.
