= Johan Zulch de Villiers =

South African politician

Mayor of Johannesburg
- In office 1 October 1897 – 31 May 1900
- Preceded by: Office established
- Succeeded by: Walter Alfred John O'Meara

Personal details
- Born: 12 July 1845 Paarl, Cape Colony
- Died: 18 July 1910 (aged 65) Pretoria, Union of South Africa
- Spouse: Susanna Margaretha de Villiers
- Children: 8
- Occupation: Politician

Johan Zulch de Villiers (12 July 1845 – 18 July 1910) was a South African politician and attorney. He was mayor of Johannesburg from 1897 to 1900.

== Life ==
Johan Zulch de Villiers was born in 1845 in Paarl, Cape Colony. He was educated at the Paarl gymnasium as well as privately by Dr. Rose Innes at Cape Town. For fifteen months he joined the Orange Free State forces in the Basuto Gun War. He passed as an attorney and was an advocate of the High Court. He then entered civil service becoming the private secretary to President Johannes Brand. Between 1881 and 1897 de Villiers was the landdrost of several towns including Pretoria, Barberton and Lydenburg. He also worked in Swaziland. The government appointed him as the first mayor (Dutch: burgemeester) of Johannesburg on 1 October 1897. The first meeting of the town council was held on 4 October 1897. He was the mayor until Johannesburg's surrender to Frederick Roberts on 31 May 1900 during the Second Boer War. The British then appointed Colonel Walter Alfred John O'Meara as the new mayor and administrator of the city. De Villiers died in Pretoria in 1910 at the age of 65.

== Personal life ==
He is a member of the de Villiers family who are of French Huguenot descent. On 1 November 1870 he married Susanna Margaretha de Villiers, the first cousin of John de Villiers, 1st Baron de Villiers. They had 8 children: Rachel Gerhardina, Secondus Petrus, Anna Matilda, Margaretha, Johan Zulch Voight, George Ferdinan Esselen, Ludowicus van der Merwe, and Septima Elizabeth Bland. His daughter Anna Matilda later married George Wreford Hudson, the master and registrar of the Swaziland court.

== See also ==
- History of Johannesburg

== Sources ==
- Barrett, R. J. (1884). The Anglo-African Who's who and Biographical Sketch-book.
- Royal Colonial Institute (1894). Proceedings: Volume 25.
- Bulpin, Thomas Victor (1955). Storm Over the Transvaal.
- De Villiers, Daniel Peter (1960). A History of the De Villiers Family.
- Shorten, John R. (1970). The Johannesburg Saga.
- Meiring, Piet (1976). Dynamite and Daisies: The Story of Barberton.
- Fraser, Maryna (1985). Johannesburg Pioneer Journals, 1888–1909.
- Van Riebeeck Society (1986). VRS.
- Jones, Huw M. Jones (1993). A Biographical Register of Swaziland to 1902.
- Phillips, Lionel (1977). All that Glittered Selected Correspondence of Lionel Phillips, 1890–1924.
- Raugh, Harold E. (2004). The Victorians at War, 1815–1914 An Encyclopedia of British Military History.

New title	Mayor of Johannesburg; 1897–1900	Succeeded by Walter Alfred John O'Meara
