= List of tallest buildings in Johannesburg =

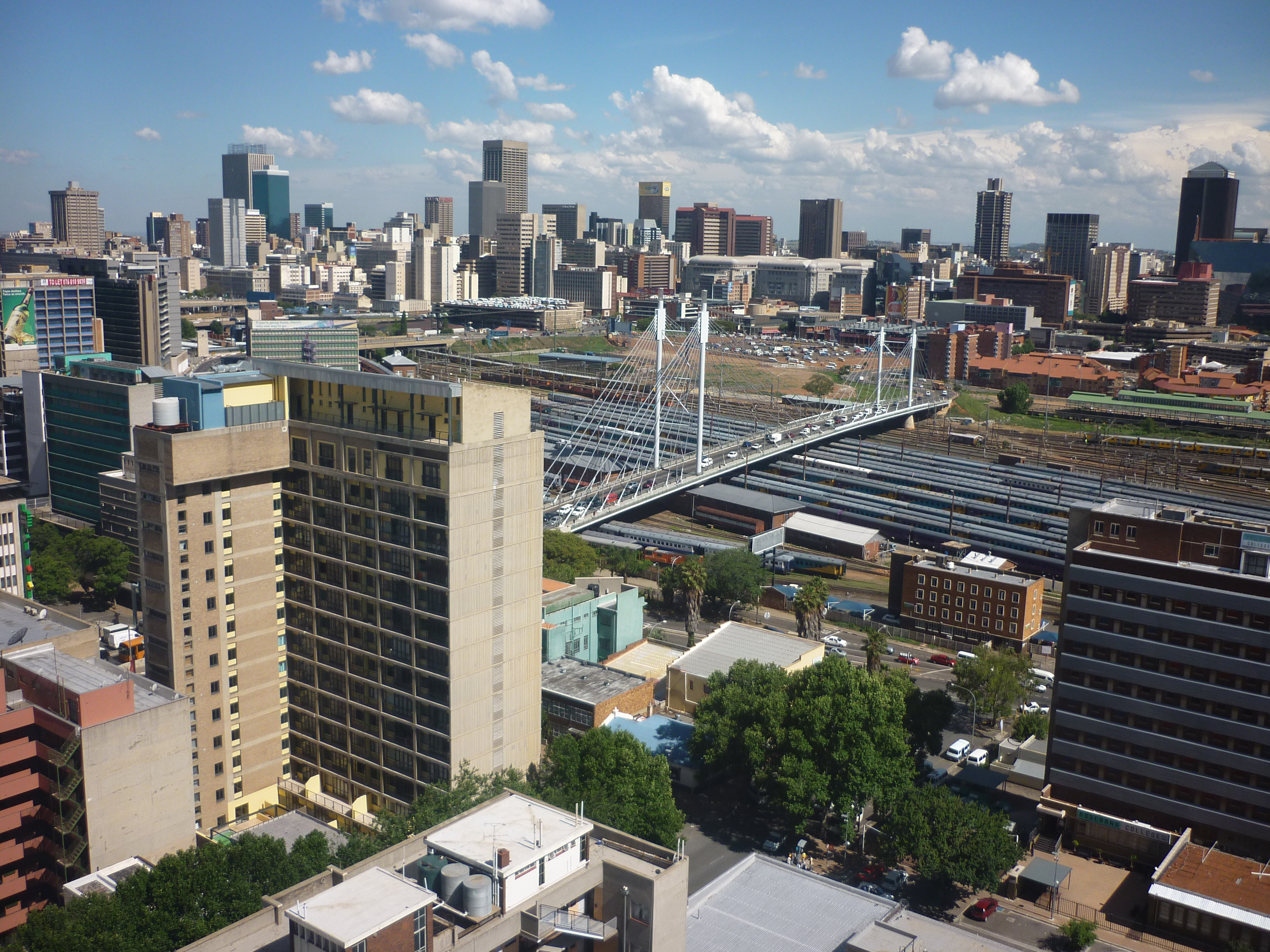
Johannesburg is the economic capital of South Africa.

This list of tallest buildings in Johannesburg ranks all completed buildings by height in the city of Johannesburg, which is the largest city in South Africa. Johannesburg is classified as a megacity, and is one of the 100 largest urban areas in the world.

== Tallest building ==
This list ranks Johannesburg buildings that stand at least 100 m (328 ft) tall, based on standard height measurement. This includes spires and architectural details.

Was the tallest building in Johannesburg upon completion

Rank	Name	Image	Height (architectural)	Floors	Built	City	Notes
N/A	Hillbrow Tower		269 m (883 ft)	–	1971	Hillbrow	Telecommunications tower. Not a habitable building, included for comparison purposes
1	The Leonardo		234 m (767 ft)	56	2019	Sandton	Fourth tallest building in Africa and the tallest building in Sub-Saharan Africa. The Leonardo was the tallest building on the continent for a brief period in April 2019.
2	Carlton Centre		223 m (732 ft)	50	1973	Johannesburg CBD	Fifth tallest building in Africa and the second-tallest building in Sub-Saharan Africa. The Carlton Centre was the tallest building in Africa for 46 years, from 1973 until 2019.
3	Ponte City Apartments		173 m (568 ft)	54	1975	Berea	Second-tallest residential building in Africa and the tallest residential building in Sub-Saharan Africa.
4	Marble Towers		152 m (499 ft)	32	1973	Johannesburg CBD	For a brief period in 1973, this was the tallest building in Africa. Marble Towers was the first building in South Africa to surpass the ancient and early medieval height of the Great Pyramid of Giza (146.6 m (481 ft)).
5	Radiopark		151 m (495 ft)	33	1975	Auckland Park	
6	Sandton City Office Tower		141 m (463 ft)	22	1973	Sandton	Refurbished in 2014.
=7	Michelangelo Towers		140 m (460 ft)	34	2005	Sandton	The tallest single-purpose hotel in South Africa.
=7	ABSA Tower		140 m (460 ft)	31	1970	Johannesburg CBD	
=7	KwaDukuza eGoli Hotel Tower 1		140 m (460 ft)	40	1970	Johannesburg CBD	Mothballed since 1998; under its previous name, the Johannesburg Sun Hotel, it was tied with the Trust Bank Building as the tallest building in Africa from 1970 to 1973.
=7	Trust Bank Building		140 m (460 ft)	31	1970	Johannesburg CBD	The Trust Bank Building was tied with the Johannesburg Sun Hotel as the tallest building in Africa from 1970 to 1973.
11	Standard Bank Centre		139 m (456 ft)	34	1968	Johannesburg CBD	The Standard Bank Centre was the tallest building in Africa from 1968 to 1970. It was the first building in South Africa taller than the Great Pyramid of Giza (138.5 m (454 ft)), which had been the continent's tallest structure from its completion ca. 2600 BC until overtaken by Cairo Tower in 1961.
12	Southern Life Centre		138 m (453 ft)	30	1973	Johannesburg CBD	
13	UCS Building		128 m (420 ft)	29	1976	Braamfontein	
14	Kine Centre		123 m (404 ft)	27	1974	Johannesburg CBD	
15	Carlton Hotel		119 m (390 ft)	30	1973	Johannesburg CBD	Mothballed since 1997
16	Schlesinger Building		110 m (360 ft)	21	1965	Braamfontein	The Schlesinger Building was the tallest building in Africa from 1965 until 1968.
17	PwC Tower		106 m (348 ft)	26	2018	Midrand	
18	Highpoint Hillbrow		105 m (344 ft)	25	1972	Hillbrow	
19	Rissik Street Post Office		102 m (335 ft)	4	1897	Johannesburg CBD	The historical Rissik Street Post Office was the tallest building in Africa from 1897 until 1965.

== Notable buildings in Johannesburg ==
Johannesburg features a variety of commercial and residential buildings, so there are also a few modern buildings such as the KwaDukuza eGoli Hotel and the Trust Bank Building. The Johannesburg-Pretoria combined metropolitan area has the densest concentration of skyscrapers on the continent and one of the densest in the world.

The Leonardo is a skyscaper in the prosperous northern suburb of Sandton. At 234 m, it is the fourth-tallest building in Africa and was the tallest building on the continent from mid-April 2019 until 29 April 2019, when it was surpassed by the Great Mosque of Algiers Tower in Algeria. It remains the tallest building in South Africa, and in sub-Saharan Africa.

Carlton Centre is a skyscraper and shopping centre located in downtown Johannesburg, South Africa. At 223 metres (730 ft), it was the tallest building in Africa for 46 years and stands at about half the height of the Willis Tower (the former Sears Tower) in Chicago. It was the tallest building in the southern hemisphere when originally completed, and remains the fifth-tallest building in Africa and the second-tallest in sub-Saharan Africa. The Carlton Centre has 50 floors, and is 223 m (732 ft) tall. The foundations of the two buildings in the complex are 3.5 m (11 ft) in diameter and extend 20 m (66 ft) down to the bedrock, 30 m (98 ft) below street level. The building houses both offices and shops, and has over 46 per cent of the floor area below ground level. A viewing deck on the 50th floor offers views of Johannesburg and Pretoria.

Ponte City is a skyscraper in the Hillbrow neighborhood of Johannesburg, South Africa. It was built in 1975 to a height of 173 m (567.6 ft), making it the tallest residential skyscraper in Africa. The 54-story building is cylindrical, with an open center allowing additional light into the apartments. The center space is known as "the core" and rises above an uneven rock floor. Ponte City was an extremely desirable address for its views over all of Johannesburg and its surroundings. The sign on top of the building is the highest and largest sign in the southern hemisphere. It advertises the South African mobile phone company Vodacom.

Marble Towers is a skyscraper in the Central Business District of Johannesburg, South Africa. It was built in 1973 and is 32 storeys tall. The building has an eight-storey parking garage attached to it. It has the biggest electronic sign in the Southern Hemisphere, measuring 44 by 32 by 12 m (144 by 105 by 39 ft). It is made out of a mixture of concrete and marble. Its main use is for commercial offices.

KwaDukuza eGoli Hotel is a skyscraper in the Central Business District of Johannesburg, South Africa. The complex, built in 1970 originally as "The Tollman Towers" (owned by the prominent South African family), were two separate towers, one 40 stories and the other 22, linked by a four-story podium with a pool deck and a running track. The building was empty for many years as the hotel, The Johannesburg Sun, relocated to Sandton. The building was then converted to a Holiday Inn, which also quickly failed. The new KwaDukuza eGoli Hotel opened in 2001, when it hosted 3000 police officers for the world summit on sustainable development, it was owned Mark Whitehead of Whitehead Enterprises, then also soon went out of business. The building is "mothballed."

Sandton City is a shopping centre located in Sandton, Johannesburg that was built as pioneer centre in 1973. The tower was built as part of a business park for downtown Sandton, a suburb of Johannesburg. Liberty Properties announced in 2008 that Sandton City would receive a R1.77 billion upgrade. Liberty Properties Chief Executive Samuel Ogbo envisaged the complex as South Africa's very own Wall Street The redevelopment will include the construction of a 60-storey office tower, new retail and office space and residential apartments. The extension will stretch to 30,000 m^{2} (320,000 sq ft) and the total complex will have a gross lettable area of 158,000 m^{2} (1,700,000 sq ft).

Trust Bank Building is a skyscraper in the Central Business District of Johannesburg, South Africa. It was built in 1970 to a height of 140 metres (460 ft). The building is the former head office of Trust Bank of South Africa, and as such has one of the largest bank vaults in South Africa. The building was sold in February 2003 for Rand 6.4 million (US$640.000), which may prompt the name to be changed to that of the new tenant.

11 Diagonal Street is a skyscraper in Johannesburg, South Africa. It was built in 1984 to a height of 80 metres (260 ft). It is designed to look like a diamond as it reflects different views of the Central Business District from each angle of the building.

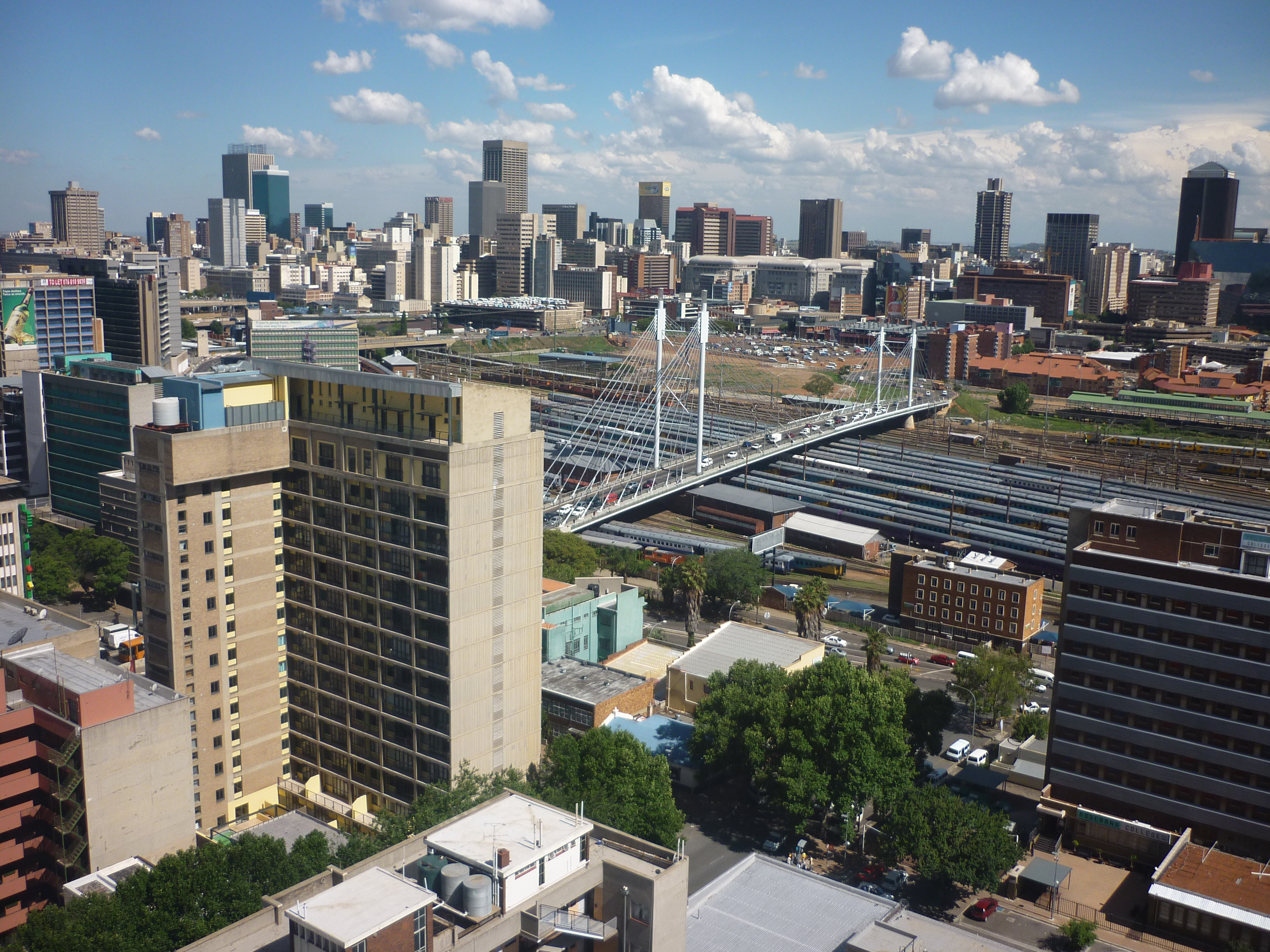
Panoramic The central business district of Johannesburg.

== Skyscrapers number by cities ==
This table shows South African cities with at least one skyscraper over 100 metres in height, completed.

Rank	City	≥100 m	≥150 m	≥200 m	≥250 m	Total
1	Durban	18	1	–	–	19
2	Johannesburg	14	2	2	–	18
3	Cape Town	10	–	–	–	10
4	Pretoria	6	1	–	–	7
5	Sandton	2	–	1	–	3
6	Bloemfontein	2	–	–	–	2
