= List of tallest buildings in South Africa =

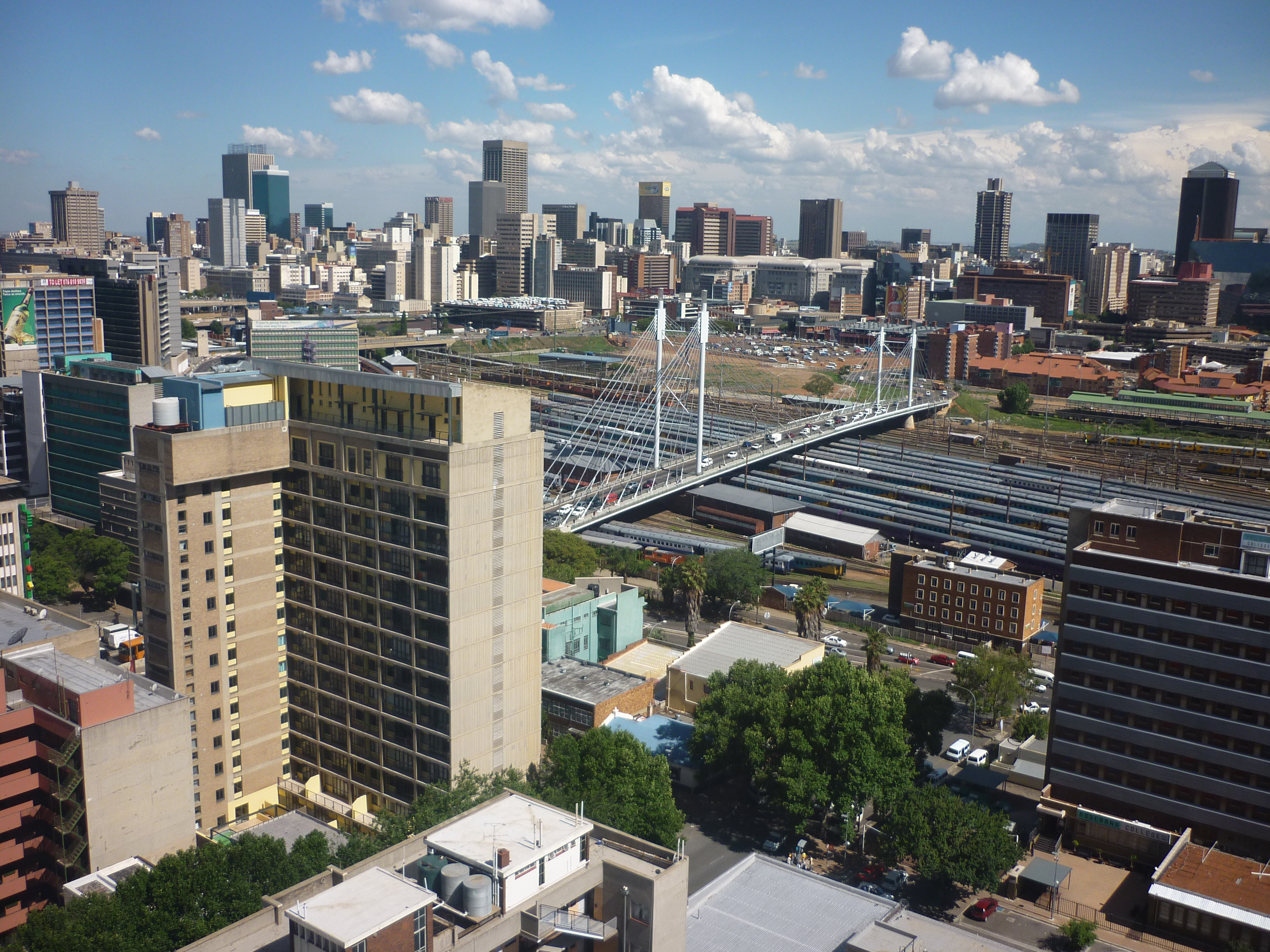
Johannesburg, the economic capital of South Africa

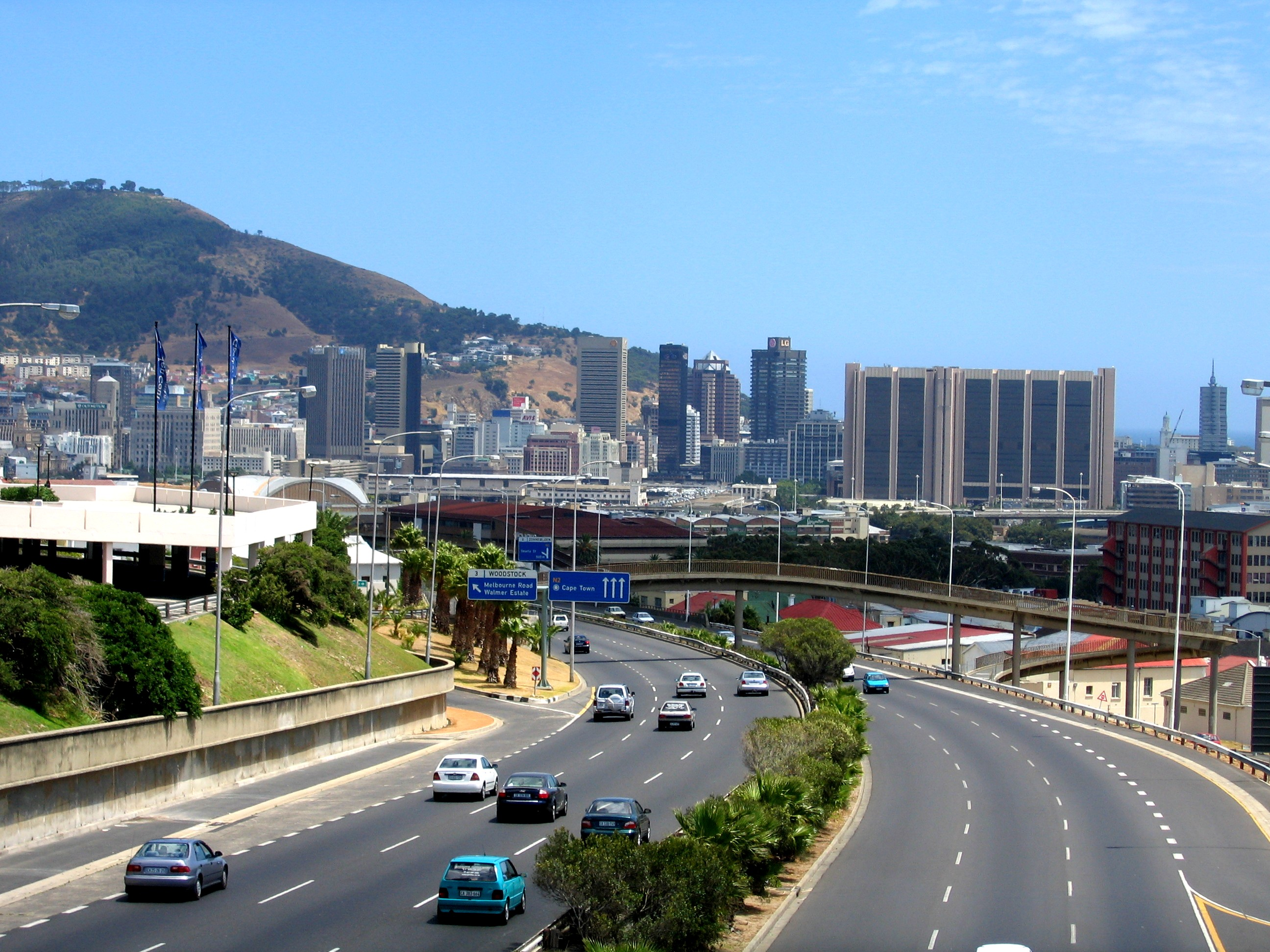
Cape Town, the oldest city in SA, and an important economic centre

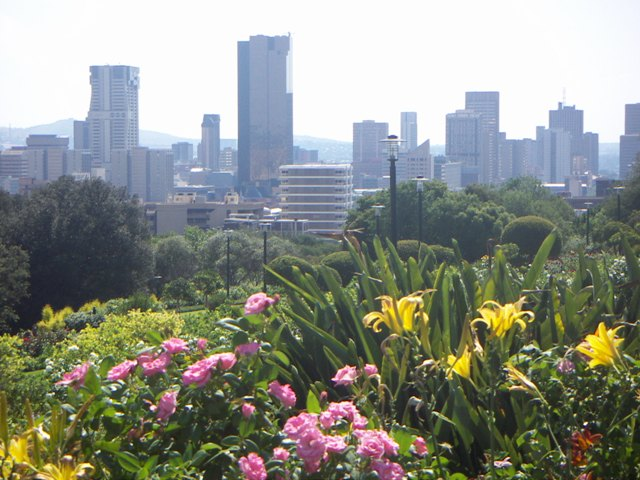
Pretoria, the executive capital of South Africa

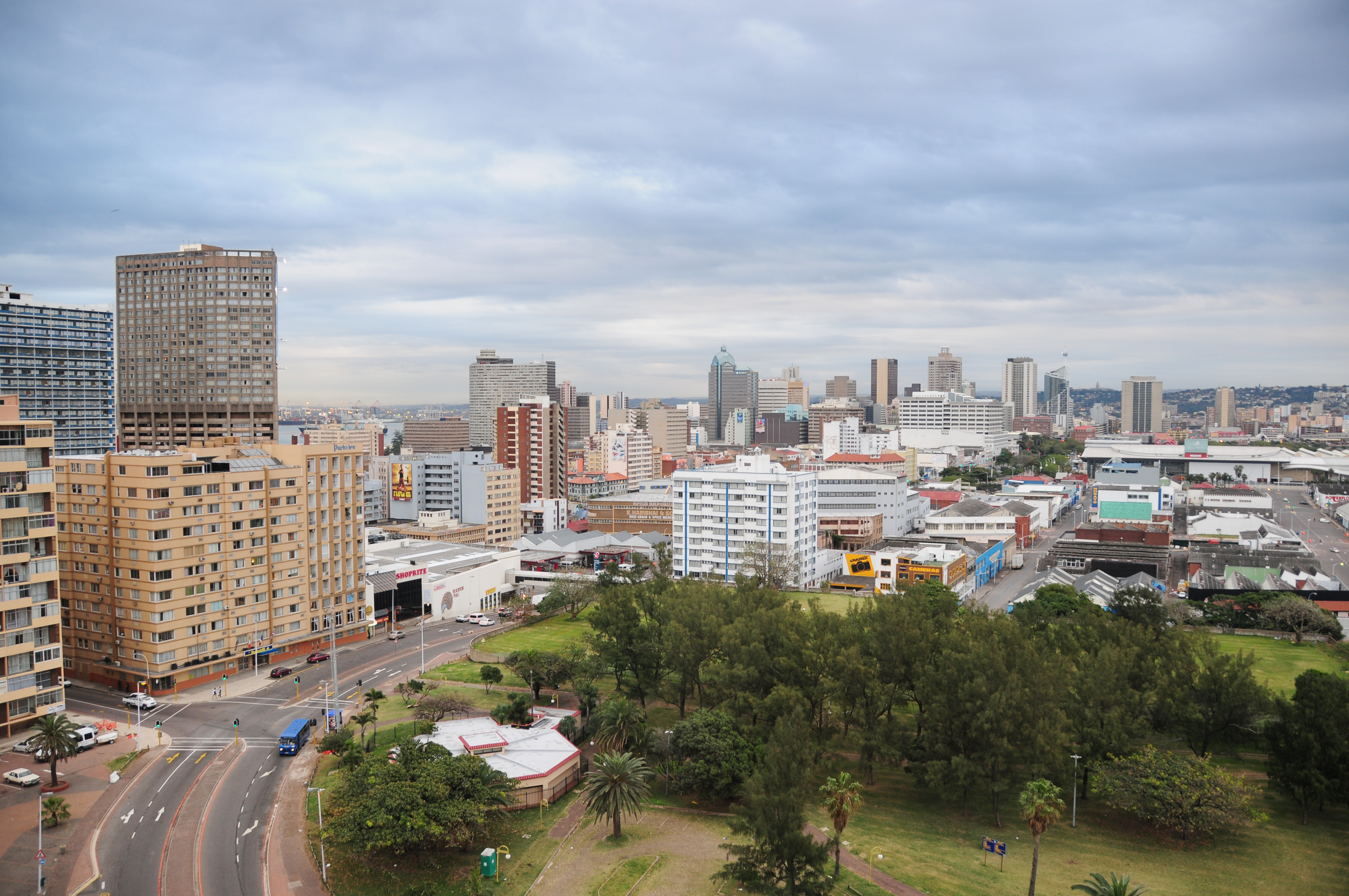
Durban, home of the busiest port in Africa, and an important economic centre in SA

Bloemfontein, the judicial capital of South Africa

South Africa is the most structurally and economically developed nation on the African continent. As such, its major cities have experienced construction booms, unlike most other cities of similar size in Africa. Advanced development is significantly localised around five areas: Cape Town, Port Elizabeth, Durban, Bloemfontein and Pretoria/Johannesburg. However, key marginal areas have experienced rapid growth. Such areas include the Garden Route (Mossel Bay to Plettenberg Bay), Rustenburg area, Nelspruit area, Cape West Coast, and the KwaZulu-Natal North Coast.

== Tallest buildings ==
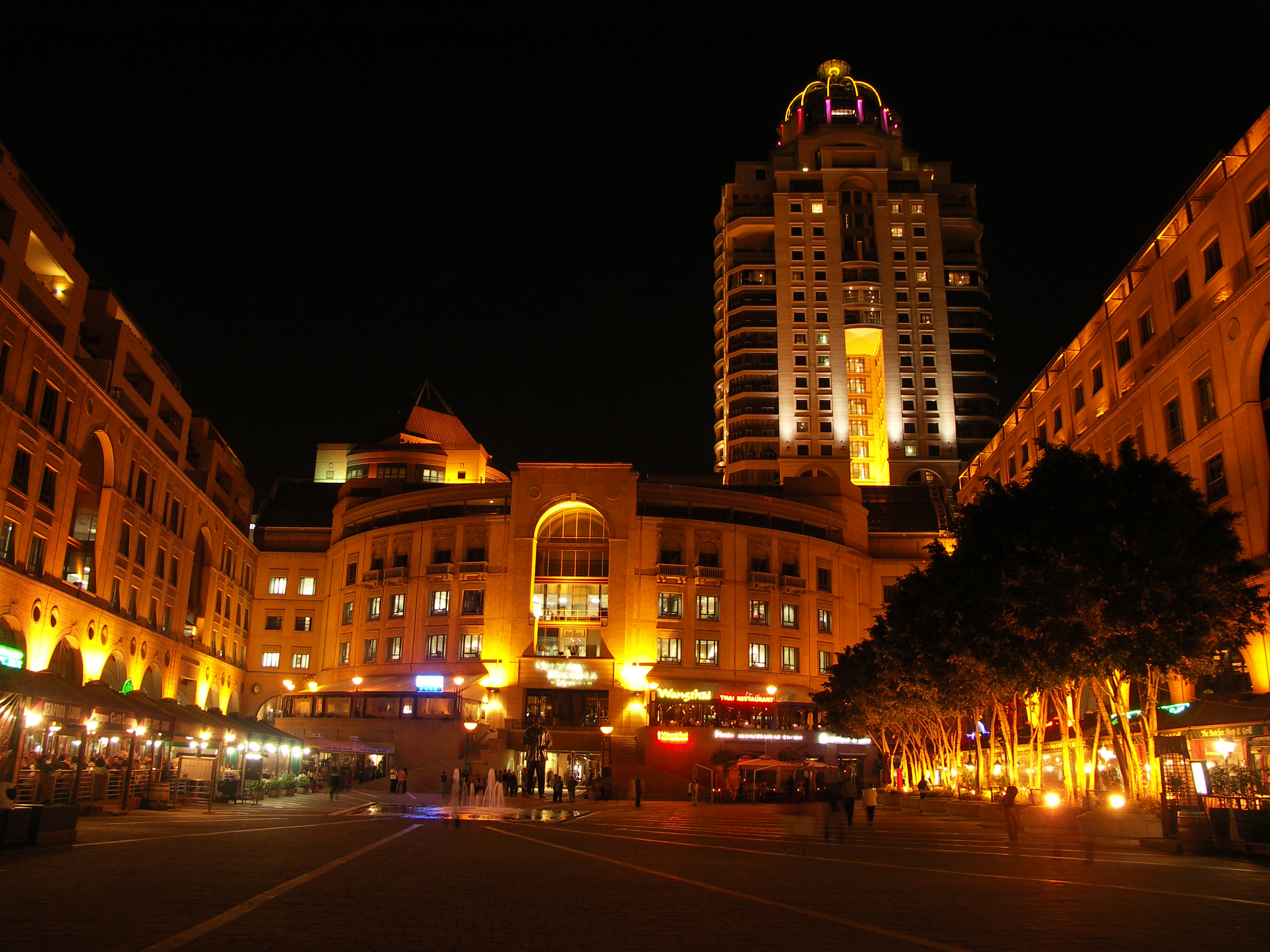
Michelangelo Towers

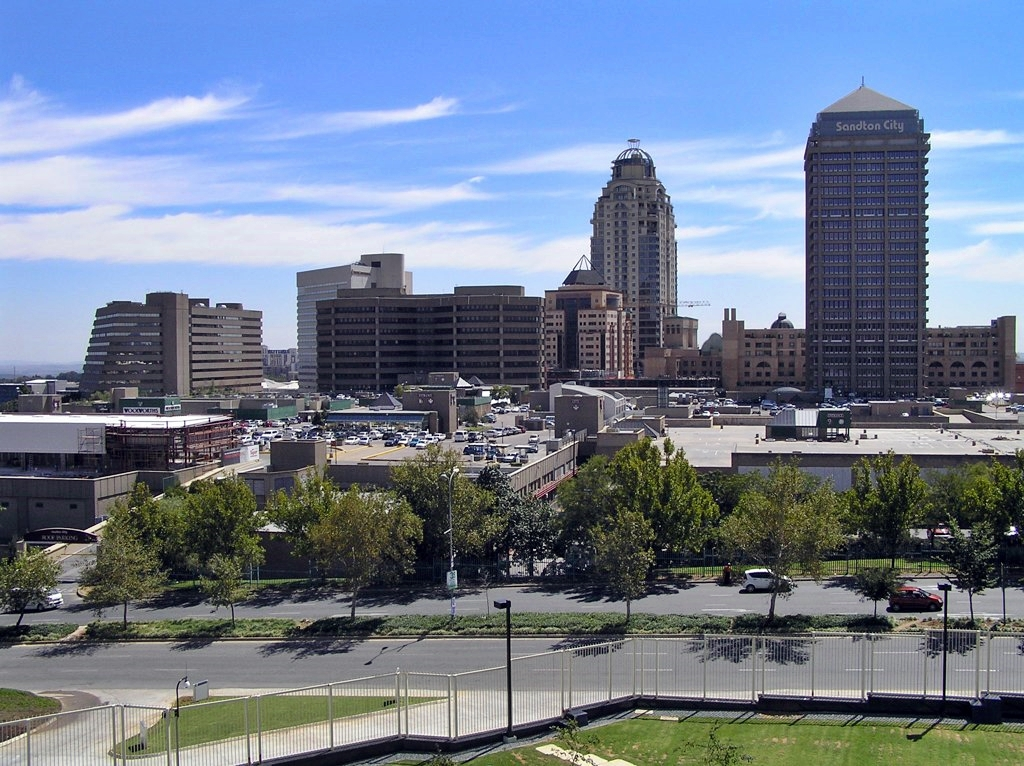
Sandton

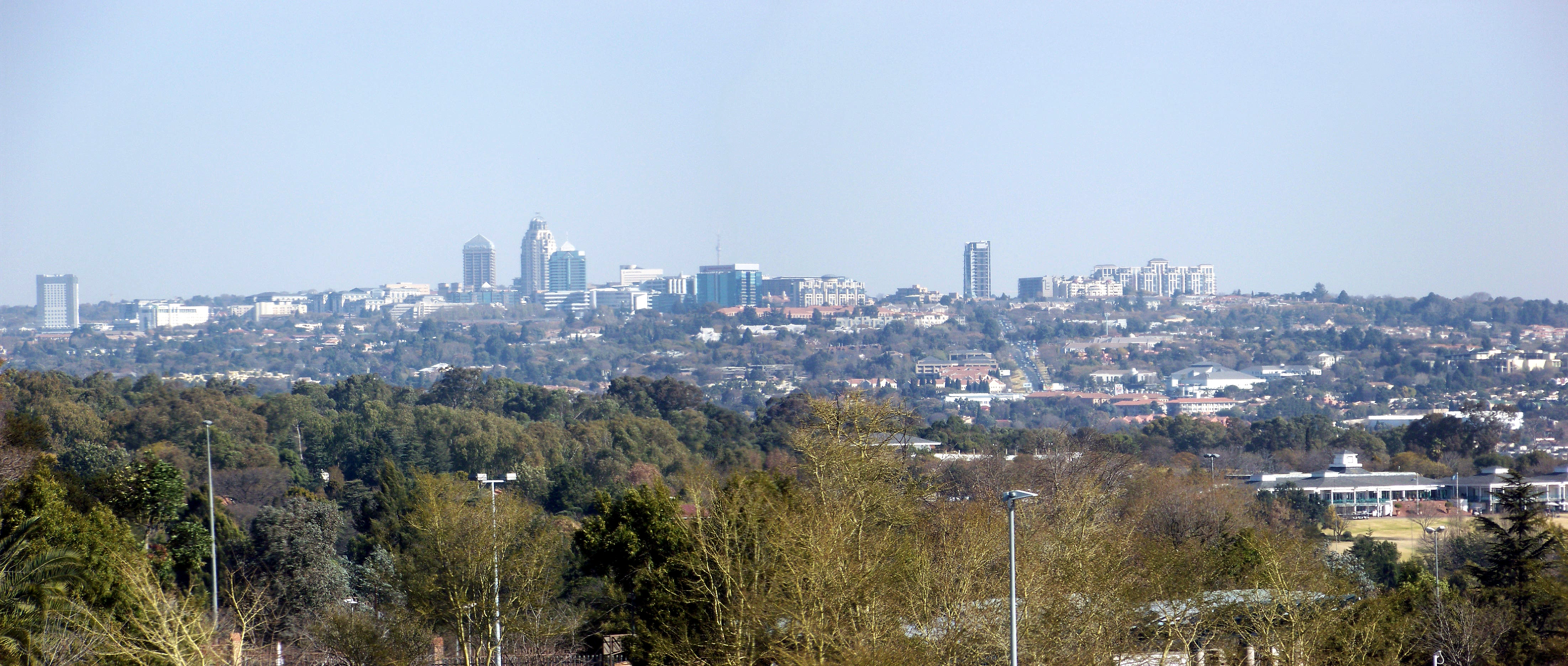
Sandton skyline

Was the tallest building in South Africa upon completion

This list ranks South African buildings that stand at least 100 m (328 ft) tall, based on standard height measurement. This includes spires and architectural details.

| Name | Image | Height (architectural) | Floors | Built | City | Notes |
|---|---|---|---|---|---|---|
| The Leonardo | | 234 m (767 ft) | 55 | 2019 | Sandton | Fourth tallest building in Africa and tallest in sub-Saharan Africa. The Leonardo was the tallest building on the continent for a brief period in April 2019. |
| Carlton Centre | | 223 m (732 ft) | 50 | 1973 | Johannesburg | Fifth tallest building in Africa and second tallest in sub-Saharan Africa. The Carlton Centre was the tallest building in Africa for 46 years, from 1973 until 2019. |
| Ponte City Apartments | | 173 m (568 ft) | 54 | 1975 | Johannesburg | Second-tallest residential building in Africa, and tallest in sub-Saharan Africa. |
| Marble Towers | | 152 m (499 ft) | 32 | 1973 | Johannesburg | For a brief period in 1973, this was the tallest building in Africa. Marble Towers was the first building in South Africa to surpass the ancient and early mediaeval height of the Great Pyramid of Giza, Egypt (146.6 m (481 ft)). |
| Radiopark | | 151 m (495 ft) | 33 | 1975 | Johannesburg | |
| South African Reserve Bank Building | | 148 m (486 ft) | 38 | 1988 | Pretoria | Tallest building in Pretoria |
| 88 on Field | | 146 m (479 ft) | 26 | 1985 | Durban | Tallest building in Durban Central. |
| Sandton City Office Tower | | 141 m (463 ft) | 22 | 1973 | Sandton | Topped out in 2014. |
| Michelangelo Towers | | 140 m (460 ft) | 34 | 2005 | Sandton | The tallest single-purpose hotel in South Africa. |
| ABSA Tower | | 140 m (460 ft) | 32 | 1970 | Johannesburg | |
| KwaDukuza eGoli Hotel Tower 1 | | 140 m (460 ft) | 40 | 1970 | Johannesburg | Mothballed since 1998; under its previous name, the Johannesburg Sun Hotel, it was tied with the Trust Bank Building as the tallest building in Africa from 1970 to 1973. |
| Trust Bank Building | | 140 m (460 ft) | 31 | 1970 | Johannesburg | The Trust Bank Building was tied with the Johannesburg Sun Hotel as the tallest building in Africa from 1970 to 1973. |
| Portside Tower | | 139 m (456 ft) | 32 | 2014 | Cape Town | Tallest building in Cape Town. |
| Standard Bank Centre | | 139 m (456 ft) | 34 | 1968 | Johannesburg | The Standard Bank Centre was the tallest building in Africa from 1968 to 1970. It was the first building in South Africa taller than the Great Pyramid of Giza (138.5 m (454 ft)), which had been the continent's tallest structure from its completion ca. 2600 BC until overtaken by Cairo Tower in 1961. |
| Southern Life Centre | | 138 m (453 ft) | 30 | 1973 | Johannesburg | |
| Monte Blanc | | 133 m (436 ft) | 40 | 1985 | Durban | |
| ABSA Tower Pretoria | | 132 m (433 ft) | 38 | 1976 | Pretoria | |
| Old Mutual Centre | | 130 m (430 ft) | 33 | 1995 | Durban | |
| UCS Building | | 128 m (420 ft) | 29 | 1976 | Johannesburg | |
| 1 Thibault Square | | 127 m (417 ft) | 31 | 1972 | Cape Town | |
| Oceans Umhlanga North Tower | | 125 m (410 ft) | 30 | 2025 | uMhlanga | Situated on Lagoon Drive, the tower adds 258 luxury residential units to the precinct, including studios, four-bedroom apartments, and penthouses. All units have ocean-facing views and direct access to Oceans Mall. |
| The Spinnaker | | 124 m (407 ft) | 27 | 2007 | Durban | |
| Kine Centre | | 123 m (404 ft) | 27 | 1974 | Johannesburg | |
| Embassy Building | | 120 m (390 ft) | 28 | 1991 | Durban | |
| Metlife Centre | | 119 m (390 ft) | 28 | 1993 | Cape Town | |
| Atterbury House | | 119 m (390 ft) | 29 | 1976 | Cape Town | |
| Carlton Hotel | | 119 m (390 ft) | 30 | 1973 | Johannesburg | Mothballed since 1997 |
| Southern Sun Garden Court Marine Parade (ex-Elangeni Hotel) | | 118 m (387 ft) | 28 | 1985 | Durban | |
| Southern Sun Garden Court North Beach (ex-Maharani Hotel) | | 118 m (387 ft) | 33 | 1978 | Durban | |
| Foreshore Place | | 117 m (384 ft) | 34 | 1970 | Cape Town | |
| 16 on Bree | | 118 m (387 ft) | 36 | 2021 | Cape Town | |
| Radisson Blu Hotel | | 112 m (367 ft) | 28 | 2022 | uMhlanga | |
| Civitas Building | | 112 m (367 ft) | 31 | 1973 | Pretoria | |
| 320 West Street | | 111 m (364 ft) | 30 | 1973 | Durban | |
| Poyntons Centre | | 110 m (360 ft) | 30 | 1968 | Pretoria | |
| Schlesinger Building | | 110 m (360 ft) | 21 | 1965 | Johannesburg | The Schlesinger Building was the tallest building in Africa from 1965 to 1968. |
| Golden Acre | | 110 m (360 ft) | 28 | 1979 | Cape Town | |
| Protea Hotel Landmark Lodge | | 110 m (360 ft) | 31 | 1976 | Durban | |
| The Palace | | 110 m (360 ft) | 26 | 1986 | Durban | |
| Agricultural Union Centre | | 110 m (360 ft) | 30 | 1968 | Pretoria | |
| John Ross House | | 109 m (358 ft) | 33 | 1973 | Durban | |
| PwC Tower | | 106 m (348ft) | 26 | 2018 | Midrand | |
| Durban Bay House | | 106 m (348 ft) | 32 | 1986 | Durban | |
| Southern Sun Cape Sun | | 105 m (344 ft) | 32 | 1982 | Cape Town | |
| Highpoint Hillbrow | | 105 m (344 ft) | 25 | 1972 | Johannesburg | |
| Pullman Hotel (ex-Radisson Blu Hotel & Residence) | | 104 m (341 ft) | 26 | 1993 | Cape Town | |
| Maluti | | 104 m (341 ft) | 33 | 1984 | Durban | |
| Transnet Tower | | 103 m (338 ft) | 27 | 1973 | Durban | |
| Pearl Sky | | 102 m (335 ft) | 31 | 2010 | uMhlanga | |
| 101 Victoria Embankment | | 102 m (335 ft) | 38 | 1981 | Durban | |
| Servamus House | | 102 m (335 ft) | 25 | 1973 | Durban | |
| Saambou Building | | 102 m (335 ft) | 30 | 1974 | Pretoria | |
| Rissik Street Post Office | | 102 m (335 ft) | 4 | 1897 | Johannesburg | The historical Rissik Street Post Office was the tallest building in Africa from 1897 until 1965. |
| Western Cape Provincial Legislature Building | | 101 m (331 ft) | 26 | 1976 | Cape Town | |
| Loch Logan Park | | 100 m (330 ft) | 20 | 1983 | Bloemfontein | |
| Bowmans Gilfillan Building | | 100 m (330 ft) | 18 | 2017 | Sandton | |

== Cities with the most skyscrapers ==
This table shows South African cities with at least one skyscraper over 100 metres in height, completed.

| Rank | City | ≥100 m | ≥150 m | ≥200 m | ≥250 m | Total |
|---|---|---|---|---|---|---|
| 1 | Durban | 20 | 1 | – | – | 20 |
| 2 | Johannesburg | 13 | 2 | 2 | – | 17 |
| 3 | Cape Town | 10 | – | – | – | 10 |
| 4 | Pretoria | 6 | 1 | – | – | 7 |
| 5 | Sandton | 2 | – | 1 | – | 3 |
| 6 | Bloemfontein | 2 | – | – | – | 2 |

== Notable buildings in Johannesburg ==
Johannesburg features a variety of commercial and residential buildings, so there are also a few modern buildings such as the KwaDukuza eGoli Hotel and the Trust Bank Building. The Johannesburg-Pretoria combined metropolitan area has the densest concentration of skyscrapers on the continent and one of the densest in the world.

The Leonardo is a skyscaper in the prosperous northern suburb of Sandton. At 234 m, it is the fourth-tallest building in Africa and was the tallest building on the continent from mid-April 2019 until 29 April 2019, when it was surpassed by the Great Mosque of Algiers Tower in Algeria. It remains the tallest building in South Africa, and in sub-Saharan Africa.

Carlton Centre is a skyscraper and shopping centre located in downtown Johannesburg, South Africa. At 223 metres (730 ft), it was the tallest building in Africa for 46 years and stands at about half the height of the Willis Tower (the former Sears Tower) in Chicago. It was the tallest building in the southern hemisphere when originally completed, and remains the fifth-tallest building in Africa and the second-tallest in sub-Saharan Africa. The Carlton Centre has 50 floors, and is 223 m (732 ft) tall. The foundations of the two buildings in the complex are 3.5 m (11 ft) in diameter and extend 20 m (66 ft) down to the bedrock, 30 m (98 ft) below street level. The building houses both offices and shops, and has over 46 per cent of the floor area below ground level. A viewing deck on the 50th floor offers views of Johannesburg and Pretoria.

Ponte City is a skyscraper in the Hillbrow neighborhood of Johannesburg, South Africa. It was built in 1975 to a height of 173 m (567.6 ft), making it the tallest residential skyscraper in Africa. The 54-story building is cylindrical, with an open center allowing additional light into the apartments. The center space is known as "the core" and rises above an uneven rock floor. Ponte City was an extremely desirable address for its views over all of Johannesburg and its surroundings. The sign on top of the building is the highest and largest sign in the southern hemisphere. It advertises the South African mobile phone company Vodacom.

Marble Towers is a skyscraper in the Central Business District of Johannesburg, South Africa. It was built in 1973 and is 32 storeys tall. The building has an eight-storey parking garage attached to it. It has the biggest electronic sign in the Southern Hemisphere, measuring 44 by 32 by 12 m (144 by 105 by 39 ft). It is made out of a mixture of concrete and marble. Its main use is for commercial offices.

KwaDukuza eGoli Hotel is a skyscraper in the Central Business District of Johannesburg, South Africa. The complex, built in 1970 originally as "The Tollman Towers" (owned by the prominent South African family), were two separate towers, one 40 stories and the other 22, linked by a four-story podium with a pool deck and a running track. The building was empty for many years as the hotel, The Johannesburg Sun, relocated to Sandton. The building was then converted to a Holiday Inn, which also quickly failed. The new KwaDukuza eGoli Hotel opened in 2001, when it hosted 3000 police officers for the world summit on sustainable development, it was owned Mark Whitehead of Whitehead Enterprises, then also soon went out of business. The building is "mothballed."

Sandton City is a shopping centre located in Sandton, Johannesburg that was built as pioneer centre in 1973. The tower was built as part of a business park for downtown Sandton, a suburb of Johannesburg. Liberty Properties announced in 2008 that Sandton City would receive a R1.77 billion upgrade. Liberty Properties Chief Executive Samuel Ogbo envisaged the complex as South Africa's very own Wall Street The redevelopment will include the construction of a 60-storey office tower, new retail and office space and residential apartments. The extension will stretch to 30,000 m^{2} (320,000 sq ft) and the total complex will have a gross lettable area of 158,000 m^{2} (1,700,000 sq ft).

Trust Bank Building is a skyscraper in the Central Business District of Johannesburg, South Africa. It was built in 1970 to a height of 140 metres (460 ft). The building is the former head office of Trust Bank of South Africa, and as such has one of the largest bank vaults in South Africa. The building was sold in February 2003 for Rand 6.4 million (US$640.000), which may prompt the name to be changed to that of the new tenant.

11 Diagonal Street is a skyscraper in Johannesburg, South Africa. It was built in 1984 to a height of 80 metres (260 ft). It is designed to look like a diamond as it reflects different views of the Central Business District from each angle of the building.

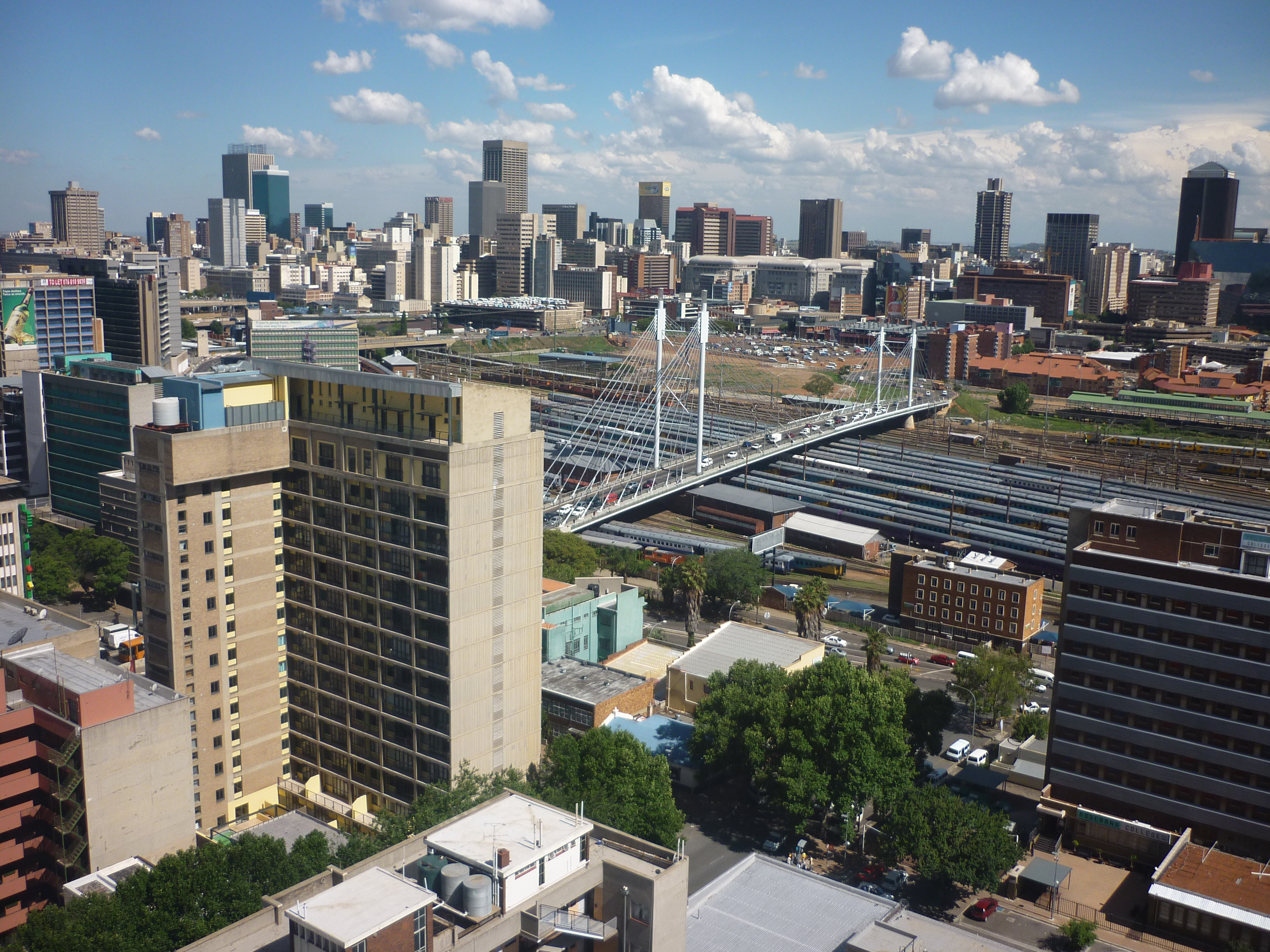
Panorama of the central business district of Johannesburg.

== Timeline of tallest buildings in South Africa ==
Timeline of the tallest buildings in South Africa. Excludes all demolished or destroyed buildings.

| Name | City | Years as tallest | Meters | Feet | Floors | Photo |
|---|---|---|---|---|---|---|
| The Leonardo | Sandton | 2019–present | 234 | 767 | 55 | |
| Carlton Centre | Johannesburg | 1973–2019 | 223 | 732 | 50 | |
| Marble Towers | Johannesburg | 1973-1973 | 152 | 499 | 32 | |
| KwaDukuza eGoli Hotel Tower 1 | Johannesburg | 1970-1973 | 140 | 460 | 40 | |
| Trust Bank Building | Johannesburg | 1970-1973 | 140 | 460 | 31 | |
| Standard Bank Centre | Johannesburg | 1968-1970 | 139 | 456 | 34 | |
| Schlesinger Building | Johannesburg | 1965-1968 | 110 | 361 | 21 | |
| Rissik Street Post Office | Johannesburg | 1910 (Note: The Rissik Street Post Office was built in 1897, and was thus already standing when the Union of South Africa was first formed.)-1962 | 102 | 335 | 4 | |

== Tallest topped out, under construction, approved, and on hold ==
This lists skyscrapers that are topped out, under construction, on hold, or approved in South Africa, but are not yet completed structures as of July 2020. This list only includes buildings of more or equal to 100 metres.

| Name | Height m / ft | Floors | Year | City | Status |
|---|---|---|---|---|---|
| Oceans Umhlanga South Tower | 125 metres (410 ft) | 30 | 2027 | Umhlanga | Under Construction |
| One on Bree | 131 metres (430 ft) | 41 | 2028 | Cape Town | Under Construction |
*Rough estimate from CTBUH. The actual height of this building has not been announced yet.

== See also ==
- List of tallest structures in South Africa
- List of tallest buildings in Johannesburg
- List of tallest buildings in Cape Town
- List of tallest buildings in Durban
- List of tallest buildings in Pretoria
- List of tallest buildings and structures in Egypt
- List of tallest structures by country
- List of World Heritage Sites in Africa
- List of tallest buildings in Africa
