= Trust Bank Building =

Skyscraper in the Central Business District of Johannesburg, South Africa

- Trust Bank in 2018
- Interactive map of the Trust Bank Building area

Record height
- Tallest in Africa from 1970 to 1973^{[I]}
- Preceded by: Standard Bank Centre
- Surpassed by: Carlton Centre

General information
- Type: Office
- Location: Johannesburg, South Africa
- Coordinates: 26°12′22″S 28°02′41″E
- Completed: 1970

Height
- Roof: 460 ft (140 m)

Technical details
- Floor count: 31
- Lifts/elevators: 14

Trust Bank Building is a skyscraper in the Central Business District of Johannesburg, South Africa. It was built in 1970 to a height of 140 metres (460 ft). The building is the former head office of Trust Bank of South Africa, and as such has one of the largest bank vaults in South Africa. The building was sold in February 2003 for Rand 6.4 million (US$640,000). Like most skyscrapers in Johannesburg the height is 140 m which is the same height as KwaDukuza eGoli Hotel, Michelangelo Towers, ABSA Tower and Standard Bank Centre, which are all 140 m tall.

== See also ==
- Carlton Centre
- Ponte City Apartments
- Hillbrow Tower
- Standard Bank Centre
- List of tallest buildings in South Africa
- List of tallest buildings in Africa

Records
Preceded by Standard Bank Centre	Tallest building in Africa; Tied with the Tollman Towers; 140 m (460 ft); 1970–1973	Succeeded by Sanlam Centre
Preceded by Standard Bank Centre	Tallest building in South Africa; Tied with the Tollman Towers; 140 m (460 ft); 1970–1973	Succeeded by Sanlam Centre
Preceded by Standard Bank Centre	Tallest building in Johannesburg; Tied with the Tollman Towers; 140 m (460 ft); 1970–1973	Succeeded by Sanlam Centre
