= Marble Towers =

Skyscraper in Johannesburg, South Africa

- View from the Carlton Centre
- Interactive map of the Marble Towers area

General information
- Status: Completed
- Type: Multi use, office
- Location: 208-212 Jeppe Street, Johannesburg, South Africa
- Coordinates: 26.201827°S 28.047495°E
- Opening: 1973; 53 years ago
- Owner: Baba Ahmadou Danpullo

Height
- Roof: 152.1 metres (499 ft)

Technical details
- Floor count: 32

Design and construction
- Main contractor: Grinaker-LTA

The Marble Towers is a skyscraper in the Central Business District of Johannesburg, South Africa. It was built in 1973 and is 32 storeys tall. The building has an eight-storey parking garage attached to it. The structure is made out of a mixture of concrete and marble.

The tower is in use as commercial offices. The building was originally known as the Sanlam Centre. It is located on the corner of Jeppe and Von Wielligh Streets.

== Gallery ==
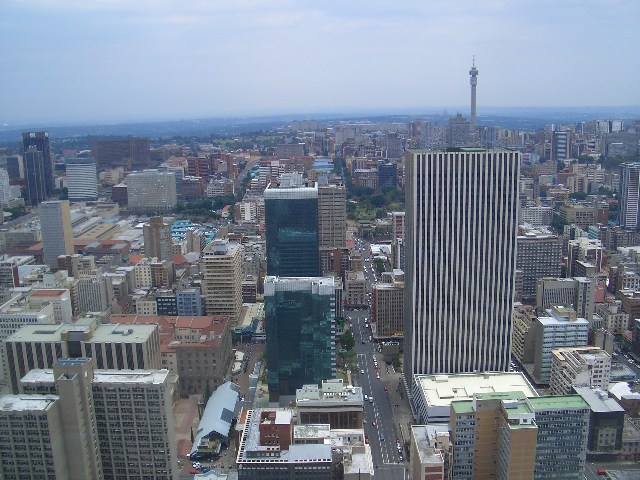

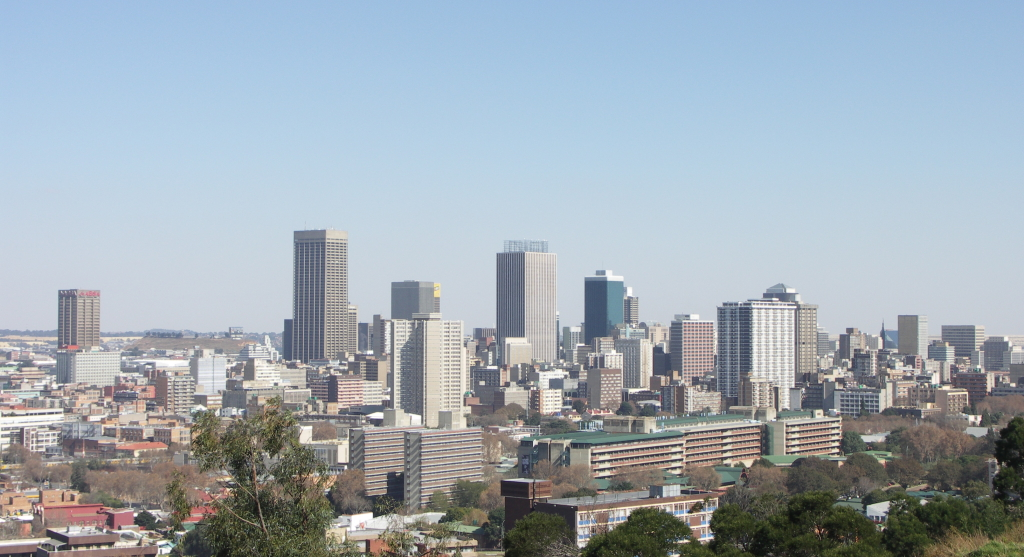

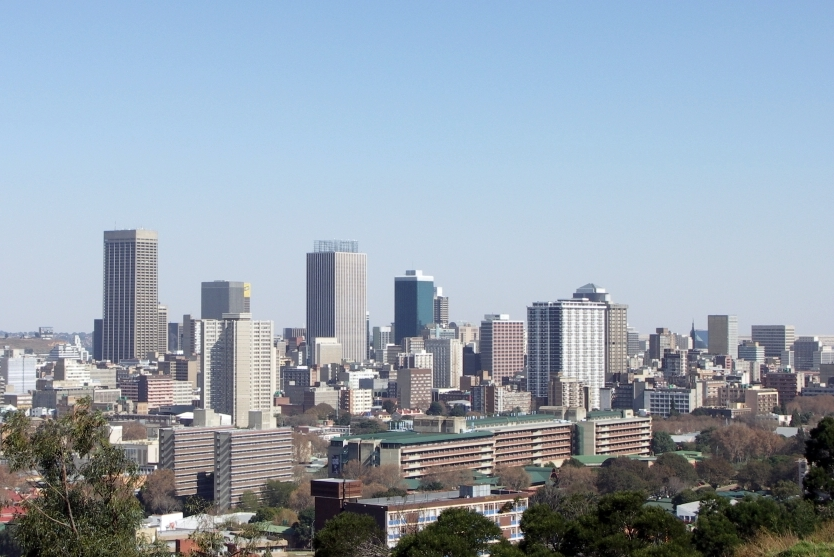

== See also ==
- List of tallest buildings in South Africa
- List of tallest buildings in Africa

Records
| Preceded by Tollman Towers and Trust Bank Building | Tallest building in Africa; 152 m (499 ft); 1973 | Succeeded by Carlton Centre |
| Preceded by Tollman Towers and Trust Bank Building | Tallest building in South Africa; 152 m (499 ft); 1973 | Succeeded by Carlton Centre |
| Preceded by Tollman Towers and Trust Bank Building | Tallest building in Johannesburg; 152 m (499 ft); 1973 | Succeeded by Carlton Centre |
