= Logistics House =

- Interactive map of the Logistics House area
- Alternative names: Courtieston House, SAA House, Spoornet House

General information
- Status: Completed
- Type: Office
- Architectural style: Modern
- Location: 39 Wolmarans Street, Braamfontein, Johannesburg, South Africa
- Coordinates: 26.1950590°S 28.0403951°E
- Completed: 1974

Height
- Architectural: 95 metres (312 ft)

Technical details
- Material: Concrete
- Floor count: 25

Design and construction
- Structural engineer: Arup Associates

Logistics House is an office tower in Braamfontein, Johannesburg, South Africa. It was built in 1974 to a height of 95 metres (312 ft). It has 25 floors. The building is the former headquarters of South African Airways.

== See also ==
- List of tallest buildings in South Africa
