= Johannesburg Sun Hotel =

Abandoned hotel in Johannesburg, South Africa

Coordinates: 26.20183°S 28.04666°E

Johannesburg Sun Hotel view from Carlton Centre in 2016.

The Johannesburg Sun Hotel is an abandoned twin-tower skyscraper hotel in the Central Business District of Johannesburg, South Africa.

== History ==
The smaller 22-storey rear tower was built in 1970 as The Tollman Towers hotel, owned by the prominent hotelier Stanley Tollman.

The property was purchased by Sol Kerzner's Southern Sun Hotels in the early 1980s and totally rebuilt at a cost of R100 million, with the addition of the 40-storey main tower, linked to the older building by a four-story podium with a pool deck and a running track. The complex re-opened in 1985 as the 672-room Johannesburg Sun and Towers.

As the neighbourhood decayed, the luxury hotel was converted to a Holiday Inn Garden Court, with only 270 rooms remaining in use, but the lack of demand for hotels in the CBD eventually caused the hotel to close completely, in September 1998. It reopened very briefly for the Earth Summit 2002 on sustainable development as the KwaDukuza eGoli Hotel, a name meaning Gathering Place in the City of Gold. The hotel was owned by Mark Whitehead of Whitehead Enterprises. It hosted 2,000 police officers, but their stay was marred by a murder in the hotel and severe problems with the physical systems of the building. The hotel soon went out of business again. The building remained empty as of November 2024.

Records
Preceded by Standard Bank Centre	Tallest building in Africa; Tied with the Trust Bank Building; 140 m (460 ft); 1970 – 1973	Succeeded by Sanlam Centre
Preceded by Standard Bank Centre	Tallest building in South Africa; Tied with the Trust Bank Building; 140 m (460 ft); 1970 – 1973	Succeeded by Sanlam Centre
Preceded by Standard Bank Centre	Tallest building in Johannesburg; Tied with the Trust Bank Building; 140 m (460 ft); 1970 – 1973	Succeeded by Sanlam Centre
Preceded by Standard Bank Centre	Building in Africa with the most floors 40; 1970 – 1973	Succeeded by Carlton Centre
