= List of tallest buildings in Durban =

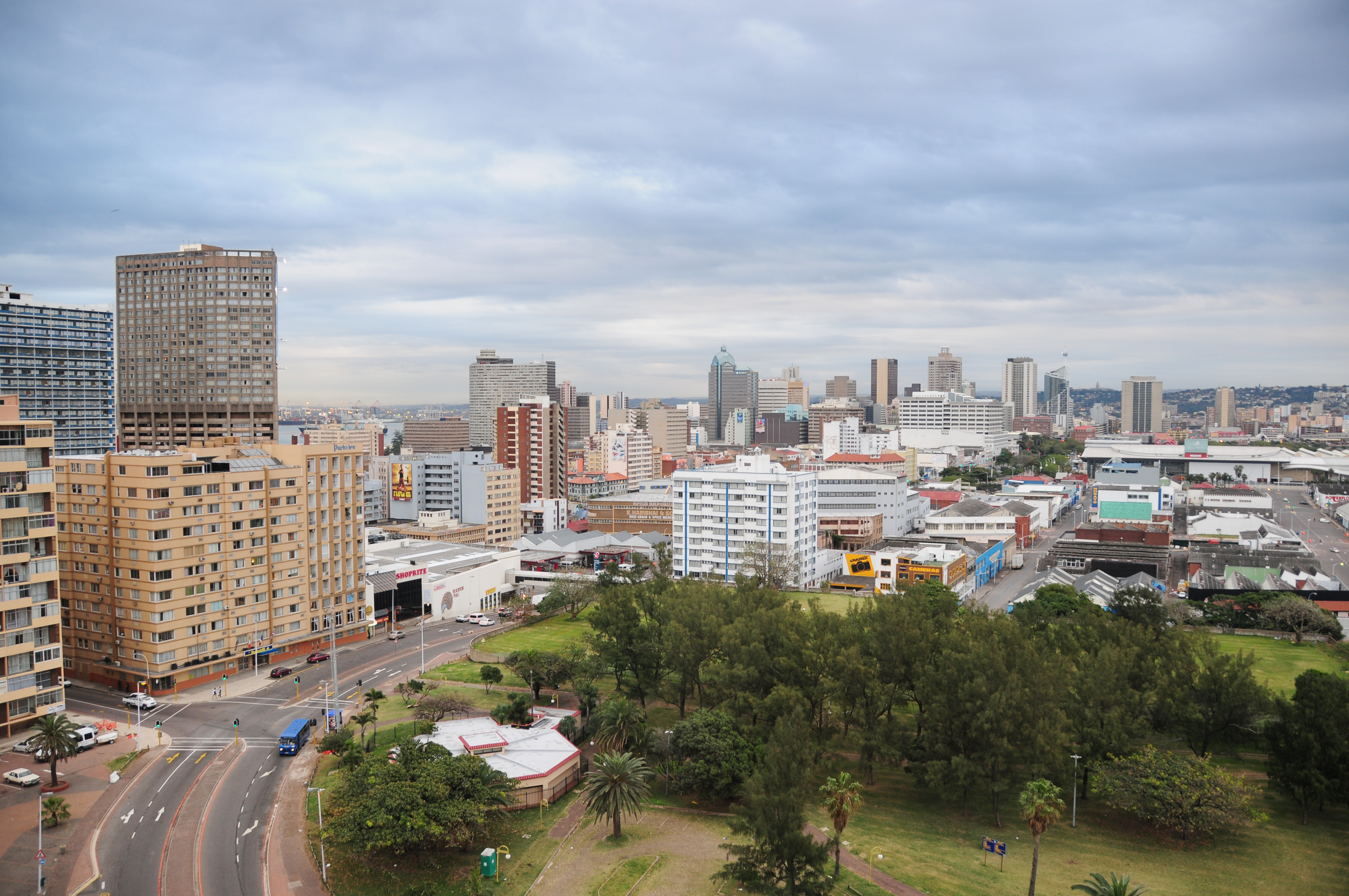
Durban, home of the busiest port in Africa and an important economic centre in South Africa.

This list of tallest buildings in Durban ranks completed buildings by height in the city of Durban (including uMhlanga) which is the third most populous city in South Africa after Johannesburg and Cape Town and the largest city in the South African province of KwaZulu-Natal.

== Tallest buildings ==
Was the tallest building in Durban upon completion

This list ranks Durban, South Africa buildings that stand at least 100 m (328 ft) tall, based on standard height measurement. This includes spires and architectural details.

Name	Height (architectural)	Floors	Built	City	Notes
Pearl Dawn	152 m (499 ft)	31	2008	Umhlanga	
88 on Field	146 m (479 ft)	26	1985	Durban	Tallest building in Durban Central.
Monte Blanc	133 m (436 ft)	40	1985	Durban	
Old Mutual Centre	130 m (430 ft)	33	1995	Durban	
Oceans Umhlanga North Tower	125 m (410 ft)	30	2025	Umhlanga	Situated on Lagoon Drive, the tower adds 258 luxury residential units to the precinct, including studios, four-bedroom apartments, and penthouses. All units have ocean-facing views and direct access to Oceans Mall.
The Spinnaker	124 m (407 ft)	27	2007	Durban	
Embassy Building	120 m (390 ft)	28	1991	Durban	
Pearl Breeze	118 m (387 ft)	25	2010	Durban	
Southern Sun Garden Court Marine Parade (ex-Elangeni Hotel)	118 m (387 ft)	28	1985	Durban	
Southern Sun Garden Court North Beach (ex-Maharani Hotel)	118 m (387 ft)	33	1978	Durban	
320 West Street	111 m (364 ft)	30	1973	Durban	
Protea Hotel Landmark Lodge	110 m (360 ft)	31	1976	Durban	
The Palace	110 m (360 ft)	26	1986	Durban	
John Ross House	109 m (358 ft)	33	1973	Durban	
Durban Bay House	106 m (348 ft)	32	1986	Durban	
Maluti	104 m (341 ft)	33	1984	Durban	
Transnet Tower	103 m (338 ft)	27	1973	Durban	
Pearl Sky	102 m (335 ft)	31	2010	Durban	
101 Victoria Embankment	102 m (335 ft)	38	1981	Durban	
Servamus House	102 m (335 ft)	25	1973	Durban	

== Skyscrapers number by cities ==
This table shows South African cities with at least one skyscraper over 100 metres in height, completed.

Rank	City	≥100 m	≥150 m	≥200 m	≥250 m	Total
1	Durban	18	1	–	–	19
2	Johannesburg	13	2	2	–	17
3	Cape Town	10	–	–	–	10
4	Pretoria	6	1	–	–	7
5	Sandton	2	–	1	–	3
6	Bloemfontein	2	–	–	–	2
