= Mariston Hotel =

Skyscraper and hotel in Johannesburg, South Africa

The Mariston Hotel is a skyscraper and hotel in the Central Business District of Johannesburg, South Africa. It was built in 1973.
