= Tygerberg building =

Highrise building in Johannesburg, South Africa

Coordinates: 26.19°S 28.06°E

The Tygerberg is an apartment highrise complex in Tudhope Avenue, Berea, Johannesburg, South Africa. It is 25 storeys tall. It overlooks Ponte Tower and Ellis Park Stadium. It is located near the Ponte City Apartments building.

The Tygerberg was designed by architect Daniel Hattingh. It houses 228 apartments over 23 floors. It is currently managed by PAL Property Management.
