= Look & Listen =

South African-based music, film and electronics retailer

- The company's logo
- Industry: Music & film retail
- Founded: 1969 (56 years ago)
- Founder: Rob Ziegler
- Defunct: 2017
- Headquarters: South Africa
- Number of locations: 19 stores (as of 2014)
- Key people: Howard Levy (CEO)
- Products: Music film merchandise electronics video games
- Number of employees: 280 (as of 2014)
- Website: www.lookandlisten.co.za

Look & Listen was a South African-based music, film and electronics retailer. The first Look & Listen store was opened in Hillbrow in the Johannesburg CBD by Rob Ziegler in 1969. Its stores sold CDs and DVDs of movies, games, electronics and merchandise.

The company was successful during the era of LP, cassette deck, DVDs and CDs, however, the rise of online music services and piracy in the 21st-century placed significant pressure on the company's business model.

On 12 February 2013, the company discontinued its online store operations. It was reported in June 2013 that the company would be looking to restart its online store operations after partnering with Mondia Media. There were 28 brick and mortar Look & Listen stores across South Africa in June 2013. In June 2014, Look & Listen entered into "business rescue" as the amount of physical stores had decreased to 19, of which 14 were described as not profitable. The company had 280 employees at that time

In May 2017, it was reported that the closure of the company's last store at the Hillfox Value Centre in Roodepoort, Johannesburg was imminent.
