= Radiopark =

- Interactive map of the Radiopark area
- Alternative names: South African Broadcasting Corporation Building (SABC Building)

General information
- Status: Completed
- Type: Office
- Architectural style: Modern
- Location: 35 Henley Road, Auckland Park, Johannesburg, South Africa
- Coordinates: 26.1866414°S 28.0108214°E

Height
- Antenna spire: 166.4 m (546 ft)
- Roof: 150.9 m (495 ft)

Technical details
- Material: Concrete
- Floor count: 33

Radiopark, also known as South African Broadcasting Corporation Building, is a 33-story skyscraper located in Auckland Park, Johannesburg, South Africa. At 150.9 m (495 ft) tall, it is currently the 5th tallest building in Johannesburg and serves as the headquarters of the South African Broadcasting Corporation.

== Construction ==
Built by Murray & Roberts, now called Concor Construction.

== See also ==
- List of tallest buildings in South Africa
