= Cocoa House =

Skyscraper in Nigeria

Coordinates: 7.38786°N 3.87926°E

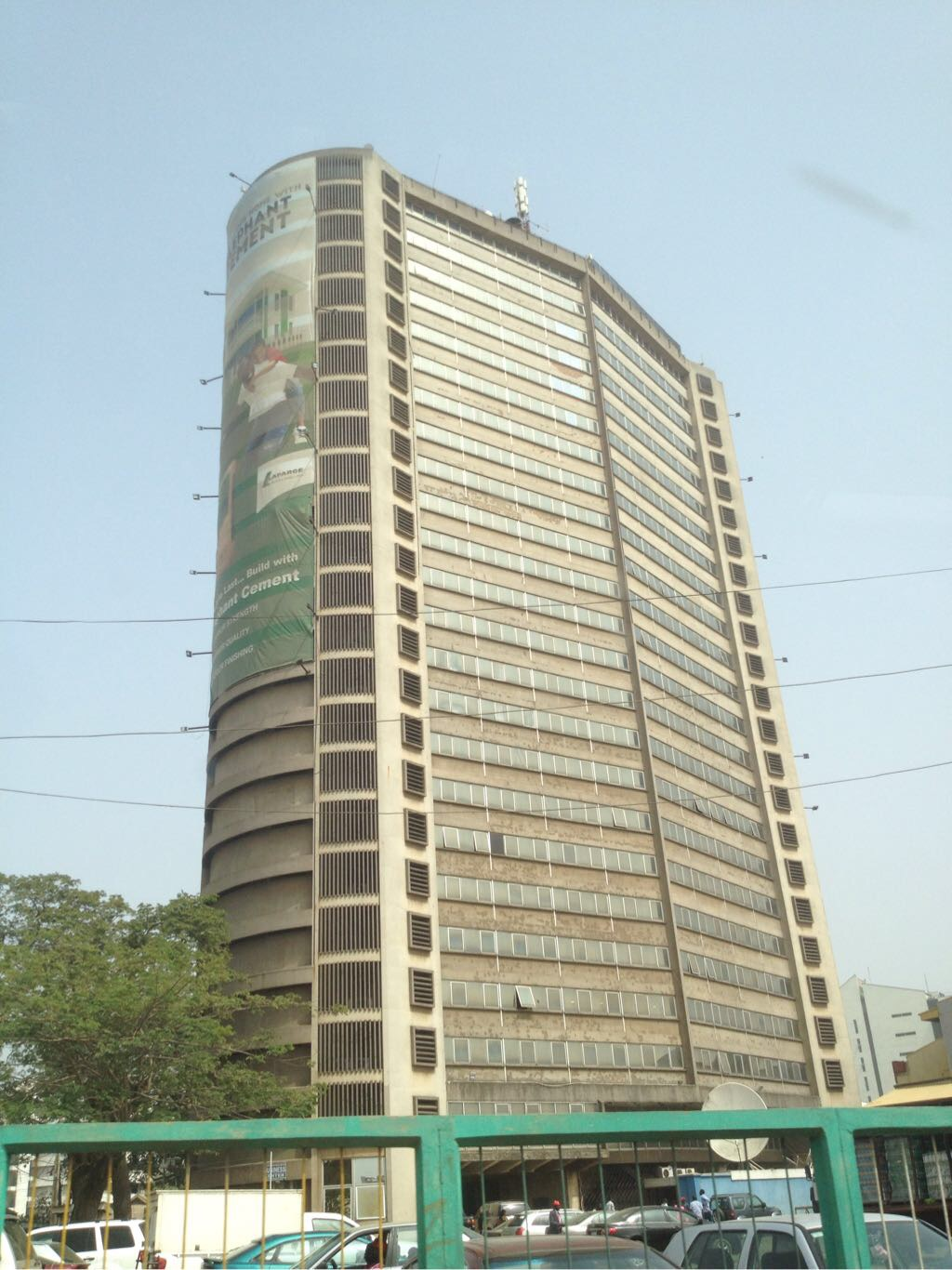
Cocoa House

Cocoa House (originally named Ìlé Àwọn Àgbẹ̀, or "House of Farmers") is a skyscraper in Nigeria. It was initiated by Chief Obafemi Awolowo in the late 1950s as part of the Western Region Development Plan (1955–1960); and completed in July 1964 and commissioned in July 1965, by the government of Western Region, headed by Chief Samuel Ladoke Akintola. At a height of 105 metres (344 ft), it was the first skyscraper in West Africa, and was, from 1965 to 1979, the tallest building in Nigeria.

It is located in Dugbe, a major commercial area in Ibadan, Oyo State, Nigeria. It was built from proceeds of agricultural commodities (e.g., cocoa, rubber, timber) of the then Western State of Nigeria.

The building today houses offices for major firms and broadcasting companies. Odu’a Investment Company Limited occupies three floors of Cocoa House. The Odua Museum and Hall of Fame which was commissioned by Professor Wole Soyinka in 2013 are within the building.

== Name ==
The initial name given to the 26-storey building was 'Ile Awon Agbe', translating from Yoruba to 'House of Farmers' in English.

The name was later changed to Cocoa House because it was built with proceeds from cocoa exportation and also because there was a cocoa tree planted in front of the building just beside a water fountain. The building, belonging to the Odua Investment Company Limited, became a source of joy and pride for the residents of Ibadan and Nigeria as a whole.

== History ==
The 26-storey building was proposed by Obafemi Awolowo with allocations from the proceeds of cocoa exportation and commissioned by the National Investment and Property Company (NIPC), a property development company set up by the government.

The entire building was gutted by fire on January 9, 1985, which began in the top floors from malfunctioning electrical equipment. It was closed from public use until it was renovated in August 1992 and re-opened for commercial use.

The building is managed by Wemabod Estates Limited, a subsidiary of O'dua group of companies. It is the property of Odu'a Investment Company Limited.

Records
| Preceded by Rissik Street Post Office and Belmont Building | Tallest building in Africa; 105 m (345 ft); 1965 | Succeeded by Schlesinger Building |
