= Rissik Street Post Office =

National monument in Johannesburg, South Africa

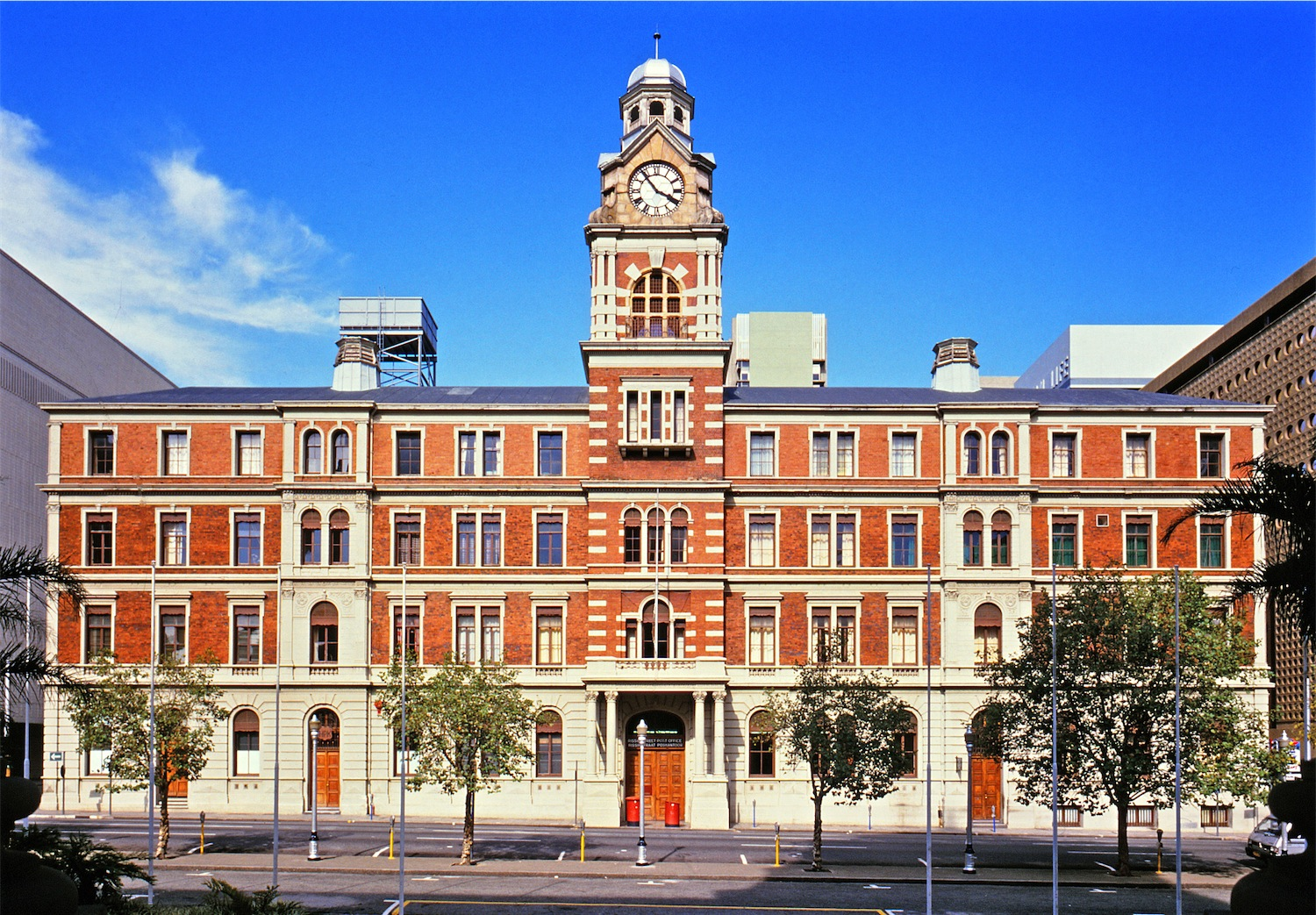
- The Rissik Street post office while still operational in 1988
- Interactive map of the Rissik Street Post Office area

General information
- Status: Under reconstruction
- Location: Johannesburg, South Africa
- Coordinates: 26°12′16″S 28°02′32″E
- Completed: 1897

Technical details
- Floor count: 4

The Rissik Street Post Office was built in 1897 during the time of Paul Kruger. Built and designed by President Paul Kruger's architect Sytze Wierda the Post Office was at one time the tallest building in Johannesburg, with a height of 102 metres (334.64 ft).

The Post Office became a national monument in 1978, and it remained in operation until 1996 when the South African Post Office vacated the building. The monument was gutted by a fire in 2009. The reconstruction with an estimated cost of R147-million began in 2016.

Records
Unknown	Tallest building in Johannesburg; 102 m (334.64 ft); 1897 – 1965	Succeeded by Schlesinger Building
New title	Tallest building in South Africa; 102 m (334.64 ft); 1910 – 1965	Succeeded by Schlesinger Building
Unknown	Tallest building in Africa; 102 m (334.64 ft); 1897 – 1965	Succeeded by Cocoa House
