= Standard Bank Centre =

Headquarters for Standard Bank in Johannesburg, South Africa

- 78 Fox Street
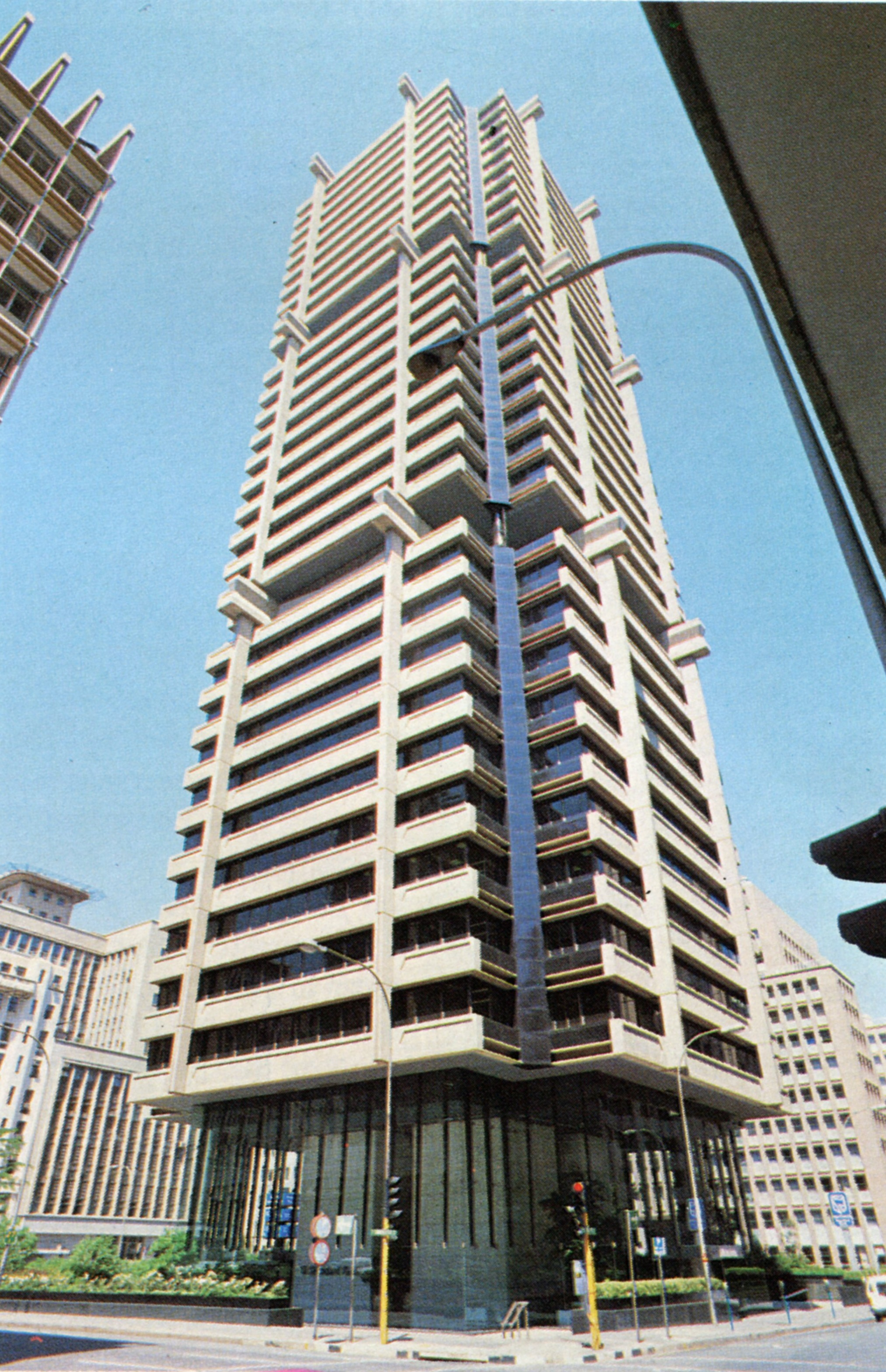
- The Standard Bank Centre, Fox Str
- Interactive map of the Standard Bank Centre area
- Alternative names: Hanging Building; 78 Fox Street

Record height
- Tallest in Africa from 1968 to 1970^{[I]}
- Surpassed by: Trust Bank Building

General information
- Status: Completed
- Type: Business-use; Office
- Architectural style: Futurism; Modern
- Location: Johannesburg, South Africa, 78 Fox Street, Central Business District
- Coordinates: 26.206594°S 28.039383°E
- Construction started: 1966
- Completed: 1968
- Opened: 1968

Height
- Architectural: 139 m (456 ft)
- Tip: 139 m (456 ft)
- Roof: 139 m (456 ft)

Technical details
- Material: Concrete
- Floor count: 34
- Floor area: 30,000 m^{2} (322,917 ft^{2})

Design and construction
- Architects: Hentrich Petschnigg & Partners
- Structural engineer: Ove Arup & Partners
- Main contractor: Concor Limited

The Standard Bank Centre (also known as the Hanging Building or the 78 Fox Street) is a skyscraper in Johannesburg, South Africa. It is located at the corner of 27 Simmonds Street and 78 Fox Street in the Central Business District of the city. Construction of the building started in 1966 and was completed in 1968. It is 139 m (456 ft) tall. It was also home to Standard Bank, until the company moved to a new site in 1990.

The building was built from the top-down, meaning that after the central core was built, the floors were suspended from cantilevered arms with the top floors added first, followed by each lower floor.

== Design ==
The challenge for the designers - the German architect Helmut Hentrich (1905–2001) and the Austrian architect Hubert Petschnigg (1913–1997), who planned the skyscraper in collaboration with the British-Danish-Norwegian engineer Ove Arup (1895–1988) - was to find a spacious square in the crowded Johannesburg CBD to anchor an office building. To keep space used to a minimum, they adopted the "hanging" design.

Apart from the concrete core tower, the Standard Bank Centre was built by Concor of precast reinforced concrete slabs, glass, and steel. The plastic molds in which the concrete slabs were cast gave them a distinctive shape. The steel girders used for the balustrades are 1.5 m high and 24.6 m long. A special slewing crane was designed for the project to lift and mount a quarter of each floor level. Concrete was delivered by night to the construction site to minimize traffic obstruction.

The office building stretches to 39 stories, of which five are underground. The lower two stories house the computer center, including the evaluation center with a staff of 300. The bank room offers access to the safe tower stretching through all the lower floors, with delivery access through the lower parking lot. The windows use tinted glass with laminated double glazing for sunlight protection. No special arrangements need to be made for window cleaning, since the 60-cm balustrades make cleaning the outer pane easy. Air vents are located in the corners of the facade. The office is 9.7 m wide. The hanging design eliminates the need for pillars.

Records
Preceded by Schlesinger Building	Tallest building in Africa; 139 m (456 ft); 1968 – 1970	Succeeded by Tollman Towers and Trust Bank Building
Preceded by Schlesinger Building	Tallest building in South Africa; 139 m (456 ft); 1968 – 1970	Succeeded by Tollman Towers and Trust Bank Building
Preceded by Schlesinger Building	Tallest building in Johannesburg; 139 m (456 ft); 1968 – 1970	Succeeded by Tollman Towers and Trust Bank Building
Preceded by Schlesinger Building	Building in Africa with the most floors 34; 1968 – 1970	Succeeded by Tollman Towers
