= Schlesinger Building =

Building in South Africa

- Interactive map of the Schlesinger Building area
- Alternative names: WesBank Centre; Sanlam Centre

General information
- Status: Completed
- Type: Office
- Architectural style: International style Modern
- Location: 222 Smit Street, Braamfontein, Johannesburg, South Africa
- Coordinates: 26.1949341°S 28.0410794°E
- Named for: John Schlesinger
- Completed: 1965; 61 years ago
- Opened: 1965; 61 years ago
- Owner: Schlesinger Organization (original)

Height
- Architectural: 110 metres (360 ft)
- Tip: 110 metres (360 ft)

Technical details
- Material: Concrete
- Floor count: 21

Design and construction
- Architect: Monty Sack

The Schlesinger Building, also known as WesBank Centre or Sanlam Centre, is a skyscraper in Braamfontein, Johannesburg, South Africa. It was built in 1965 to a height of 110 metres (360 ft), and has 21 floors. The building is named for John Schlesinger, a Johannesburg businessman who was also one of the first major art collectors in the city.

Doreen E. Greig, who was the first female president-in-chief of the South African Institute of Architects, described the building in her book as 'an immense building' with a 'sombre and monumental' aspect, which derived from the reflection of grey-green glass sheathing. Its facade are swollen and its vertical aluminium mullions are balanced by the horizontal glass spandrels, which also less obscure than the fenestration.

== See also ==
- List of tallest buildings in Africa
- List of tallest buildings in South Africa

Records
| Preceded by Cocoa House | Tallest building in Africa; 110 m (361 ft); 1965 – 1968 | Succeeded by Standard Bank Centre |
| Preceded by Rissik Street Post Office | Tallest building in South Africa; 110 m (361 ft); 1965 – 1968 | Succeeded by Standard Bank Centre |
| Preceded by Rissik Street Post Office | Tallest building in Johannesburg; 110 m (361 ft); 1965 – 1968 | Succeeded by Standard Bank Centre |
