= Southern Life Centre =

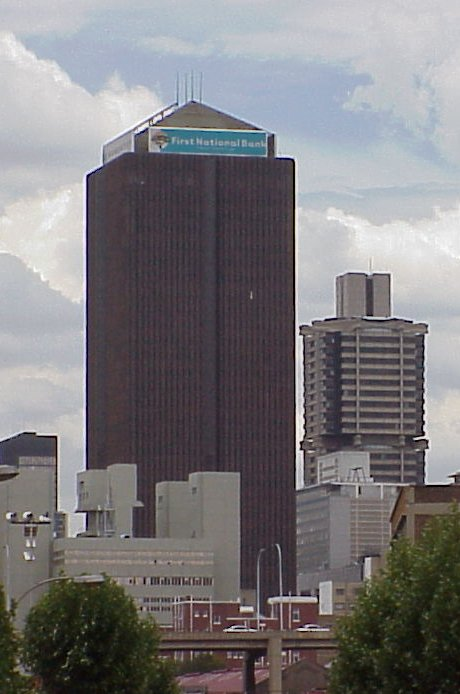
- The Southern Life Centre with the Standard Bank Centre in the background
- Interactive map of the Southern Life Centre area

General information
- Location: Johannesburg, South Africa
- Coordinates: 26.2058°S 28.0366°E
- Completed: 1973

Height
- Roof: 138 m (453 ft)

The Southern Life Centre is an international style skyscraper in the Central Business District of Johannesburg, South Africa.

== History ==
Construction started in 1970 and was completed in 1973. The architects were Monty, Sack, Nurcombe, Summerley, Ringrose and Partners, while the structural engineeriners were Ove Arup and Partners.

== Description ==
The building has a height of 138 metres (453 ft) and comprises 30 floors. It is also known as African Eagle Life Centre/Momentumn Life Centre. It is notable for having a pyramid glass shape on its roof. The building is also used for advertising. The skyscraper is located at 45 Commissioner Street 323 m North West of Standard Bank Centre. It is the 15th tallest building in South Africa.
