= Kine Centre =

Modern style skyscraper in the Central Business District of Johannesburg, South Africa

- Interactive map of the Kine Centre area

General information
- Coordinates: 26.20458°S 28.0463°E
- Completed: 1974

Height
- Height: 123 metres

Technical details
- Floor count: 25

The Kine Centre is a modern style skyscraper in the Central Business District of Johannesburg, South Africa.

== History ==
The Kine Centre was built on the site of the Empire Theatre. The theatre was closed in April 1971 and was demolished by the Schlesinger Corporation. It was built in 1974 to a height of 123 metres. The building has 25 floors of office space, several large stores, a 10-screen cinema complex that seats 2500 people which was mothballed in 2004, and two levels of underground parking. The building also has a famous penthouse located on the top floor. Kine Centre's Ster-Kinekor cinema complex opened in September 1974 with three screens and was refurnished in 1988 to ten screens as Ster-Kinekor’s Kine Entertainment Centre. The Kine Centre is connected to the Carlton Centre via a pedestrian tunnel. The building was sold for Rand 9.1 million (US$910,000) in February 2003.
