= Highpoint Hillbrow =

- Interactive map of the Highpoint Hillbrow area

General information
- Status: Completed
- Type: Residential
- Architectural style: Modern
- Location: Kotze Street, Hillbrow, Johannesburg, South Africa
- Coordinates: 26.1894106°S 28.0486043°E
- Completed: 1972

Height
- Architectural: 105 metres (344 ft)
- Tip: 105 metres (344 ft)

Technical details
- Material: Concrete
- Floor count: 28

Design and construction
- Architects: Monty Sack; Anthony Dominique Nassau Mallows

Highpoint Hillbrow is a skyscraper in Hillbrow, Johannesburg, South Africa. It was built in 1972 to a height of 105 metres. The building is mostly apartments built on top of a large shopping centre and cinema.

== See also ==
- List of tallest buildings in South Africa

Records
Unknown	Tallest residential building in Africa; 105 m (344 ft); 1972 – 1975	Succeeded by Ponte City
