= 88 on Field =

Skyscraper in Durban, KwaZulu-Natal, South Africa

- Location within Durban
- Former names: Southern Life Building

General information
- Status: Completed
- Location: 88 field Street, Durban, South Africa
- Coordinates: 29.8580°S 31.0221°E
- Construction started: 1983
- Completed: 1985

Height
- Height: 146.5 meters (481 feet)

Technical details
- Floor count: 26
- Lifts/elevators: 8

Renovating team
- Architects: Murphy/Jahn Architects; Stauch Vorster Architects
- Structural engineer: Ove Arup & Partners

88 on Field is a skyscraper in Durban, KwaZulu-Natal, South Africa. It was built in 1985, has 25 floors and is 147 meters (482 feet) tall.

== See also ==
- List of tallest buildings in South Africa
- List of tallest buildings in Africa
