= Carlton Centre =

Skyscraper in Johannesburg, South Africa

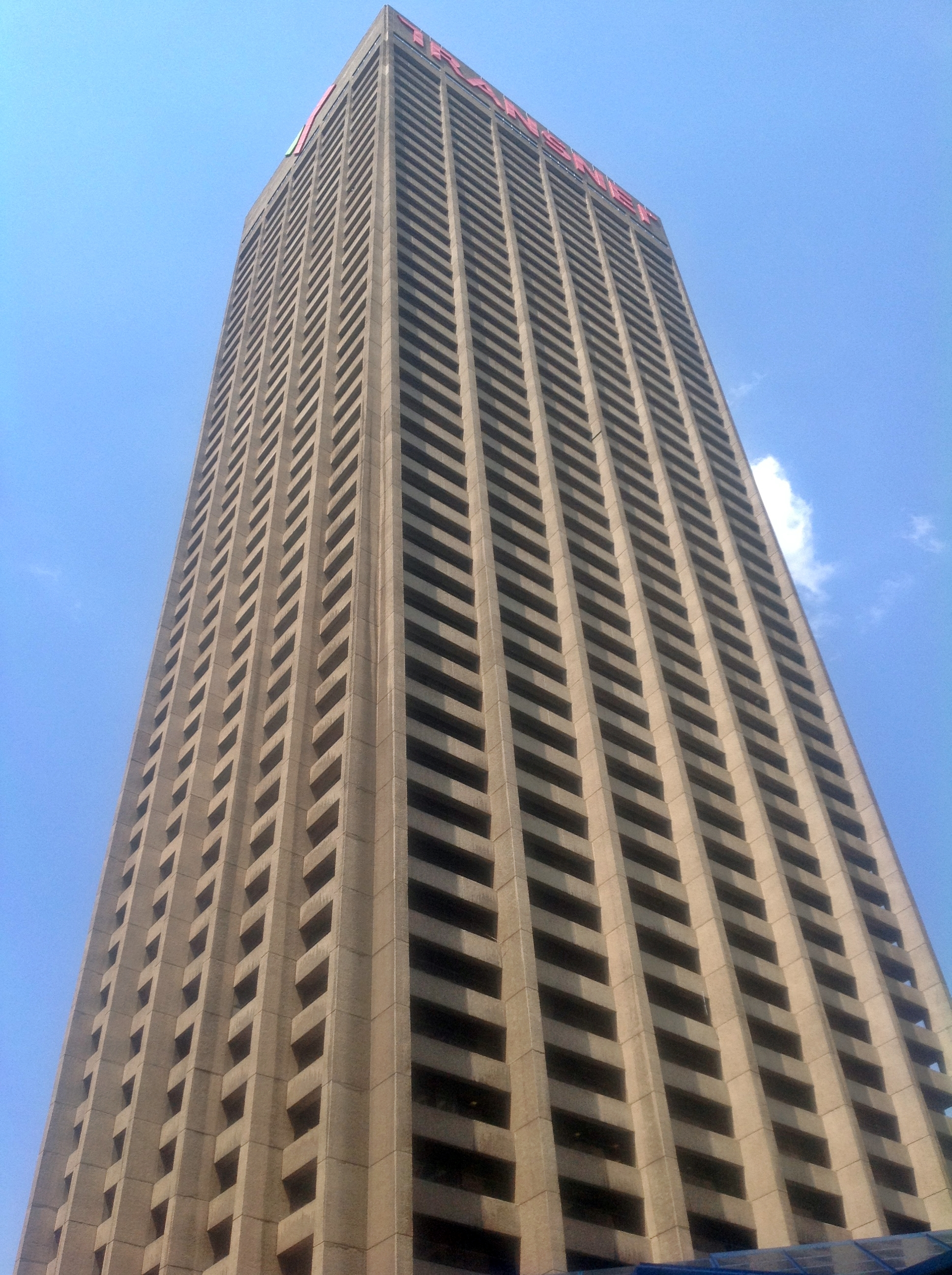
- Interactive map of the Carlton Centre area

Record height
- Tallest in Africa from 1973 to 2019^{[I]}
- Preceded by: Trust Bank Building
- Surpassed by: The Leonardo

General information
- Status: Completed
- Type: Multi use, Office, Shopping mall
- Location: Commissioner Street, Johannesburg, South Africa
- Coordinates: 26°12′20″S 28°2′48″E
- Construction started: 1967
- Completed: 1974
- Opened: 1973
- Owner: Transnet

Height
- Roof: 223 metres (730 ft)

Technical details
- Floor count: 50
- Floor area: 75,355 square metres (811,110 sq ft)
- Lifts/elevators: 23

Design and construction
- Architect: Skidmore, Owings and Merrill
- Main contractor: Murray & Roberts Construction now called Concor

Website
- http://carltoncentre.co.za/

The Carlton Centre is a 50-storey skyscraper and shopping centre located on Commissioner Street in central Johannesburg, South Africa. At 223 metres (732 ft), it was the tallest building in Africa for 46 years from its completion in 1973 until 2019. It is today the continent's fifth tallest building after The Leonardo (also in Johannesburg), the Mohammed VI Tower in Morocco, the Great Mosque of Algiers Tower in Algeria and the Iconic Tower in Egypt. From completion until 1977 it was also the tallest building in the Southern Hemisphere: the only South African building to have held that title. The foundations of the two buildings in the complex are 5 m (16 ft) in diameter and extend 15 m (49 ft) down to the bedrock, 35 m (115 ft) below street level. The building houses both offices and shops, and has over 46 per cent of the floor area below ground level.

The Carlton Centre is linked to the Carlton Hotel by a below-ground shopping centre with over 180 shops.

== History ==
=== Design and construction ===
Part of the land required for this project consisted of northern and southern city blocks bordered by Commissioner Street in the north, and Main in the south connected by Smal Street. To the west was Kruis Street connected by Fox Street to Von Wielligh in the east. On the two southern blocks bordered by Fox, Kruis, Main and von Wielligh stood the old Castle Lager brewery. A new brewery was constructed in the southern suburbs, so this site was demolished by South African Breweries and sold to the Schlesinger family who turned the blocks into temporary parking lots. The original Carlton Hotel had been demolished in 1963 by John Schlesinger, son of I.W. Schelesinger, and the company had plans to build a shop and office block.

South African Breweries, under Tom Sceales, decided to build a hotel in the Johannesburg CBD, and after seeking his board's permission to reverse the old decision to sell off the land, repurchased the land. At the same time, Anglo American's property division was investigating property to purchase in order to create a superblock in the city. The two ideas merged, and Harry Gotlieb of J.H. Isaacs was employed as the two party's secret intermediary, who purchased the Schlesinger's southern block. He then negotiated the purchase of the northern block between Fox and Commissioner streets from fifteen companies and thirty individuals. One holdout, Barclays Bank, would purchase a 10% stake in the project for its sale of its plot, leaving SA Breweries and Anglo each with a 45% share. Part of a block in Main Street across from the Southern section was purchased. The project was announced on 24 November 1963.

US architectural firm Skidmore, Owings and Merrill designed the Carlton Centre in conjunction with a local firm W. Rhodes-Harrison, Hoffe and Partners. The concept plan was for a fifty storey office building, 600 room luxury hotel, and a department store at ground level. The latter three buildings would sit on plaza with an open air circular court leading two underground shopping levels. The plan included 2,000 parking spaces below the plaza including one level for deliveries for the retail shops and restaurants. A building, across from the plaza on Main Street, consisted of a ground floor with shops and department store, and two subfloors consisting of shops connected to plaza's underground shopping level. The upper floors, above the shops and department store, consisted of six levels for parking with the last level consisting of a conference exhibition floor. The buildings would be constructed of poured in place concrete with a sandblasted grey granite finish with floor space of 3,500,000 square feet. The design of the office tower is very similar to that of One Seneca Tower in Buffalo, New York, completed in 1973.

Anglo American Properties began construction in the late 1960s by the closing roads to form a city superblock. Excavation of the superblocks basement began in 1966 by LTA, excavating 1 million tons of earth to a depth of 30m and boreholes drilled to keep out the water table. The excavations and basement shell were completed in 1968. Murray & Roberts won the tender to build the site and started work in 1968.

The original department store on the north-western edge of the superblock opened on 14 July 1971 with Garlicks as the tenant. The other original department store was OK Bazaars. Offices shops and shops opened between 1971 and 1972. Carlton Panorama, as it was called at the time, and on the top floor of the office block, was handed over from contractors in August 1973.

In 1972, SA Breweries sold its share to Anglo America because it was concerned about the financial viability of the project. The Carlton Centre was officially opened on 1 September 1973 at a total cost of over R88 million. The hotel itself had cost R23 million. Western International Hotels was appointed to run the new Carlton Hotel.

The Kine Centre, consisting of a cinema, office block and retail shops, was built by the Schlesinger's opposite the northern part of the super block on Commissioner Street and connected it to the Carlton Centre by underground pedestrian tunnel accessed from pavement at street level.

=== Use ===
The building is the head office of transport parastatal Transnet, who purchased it in 1999 from Anglo American Properties (Amaprop). In June 2007, then Transnet group chief executive Maria Ramos revealed the company's intention to offer the building for sale. The Carlton Centre had served as Transnet's headquarters since 2000; it had also been the headquarters of AECI in the 1980s and 1990s before the city's urban decay began, after the parastatal purchased it for R33 million from Anglo American Properties. The disposal of the property forms part of Transnet's restructuring programme, which includes the disposal of non-core assets. Due to the Great Recession, the parastatal announced it would not seek a buyer until markets recovered.

Although Transnet has given no indication of the price, the replacement cost of the building has been estimated at R1.5 billion.

The centre, after being almost empty, now has 93 percent occupancy of its office space and retail occupancy of 65 percent. Pick n Pay plans to take 3,000 square metres in the centre and the South African Revenue Service has moved from Rissik Street to its premises of 5,000 square metres in the centre. While there have been proposals to reinstate the Carlton Hotel at some stage, no official announcements to this end have been made.

== Other information ==
The 50th and topmost floor of the Carlton Centre was called the Carlton Panorama and is known colloquially as the "Top of Africa". Once the tallest building in the Southern Hemisphere, the Carlton Centre opened with the 5-star and 30-storey Carlton Hotel taking up most of the floor space of the complex. The hotel was popular among the rich and famous, hosting many famous guests over the years. Urban decay in the inner city during the 1990s affected the hotel, which ceased operations in 1998 after nearly 25 years of operation.

== Gallery ==
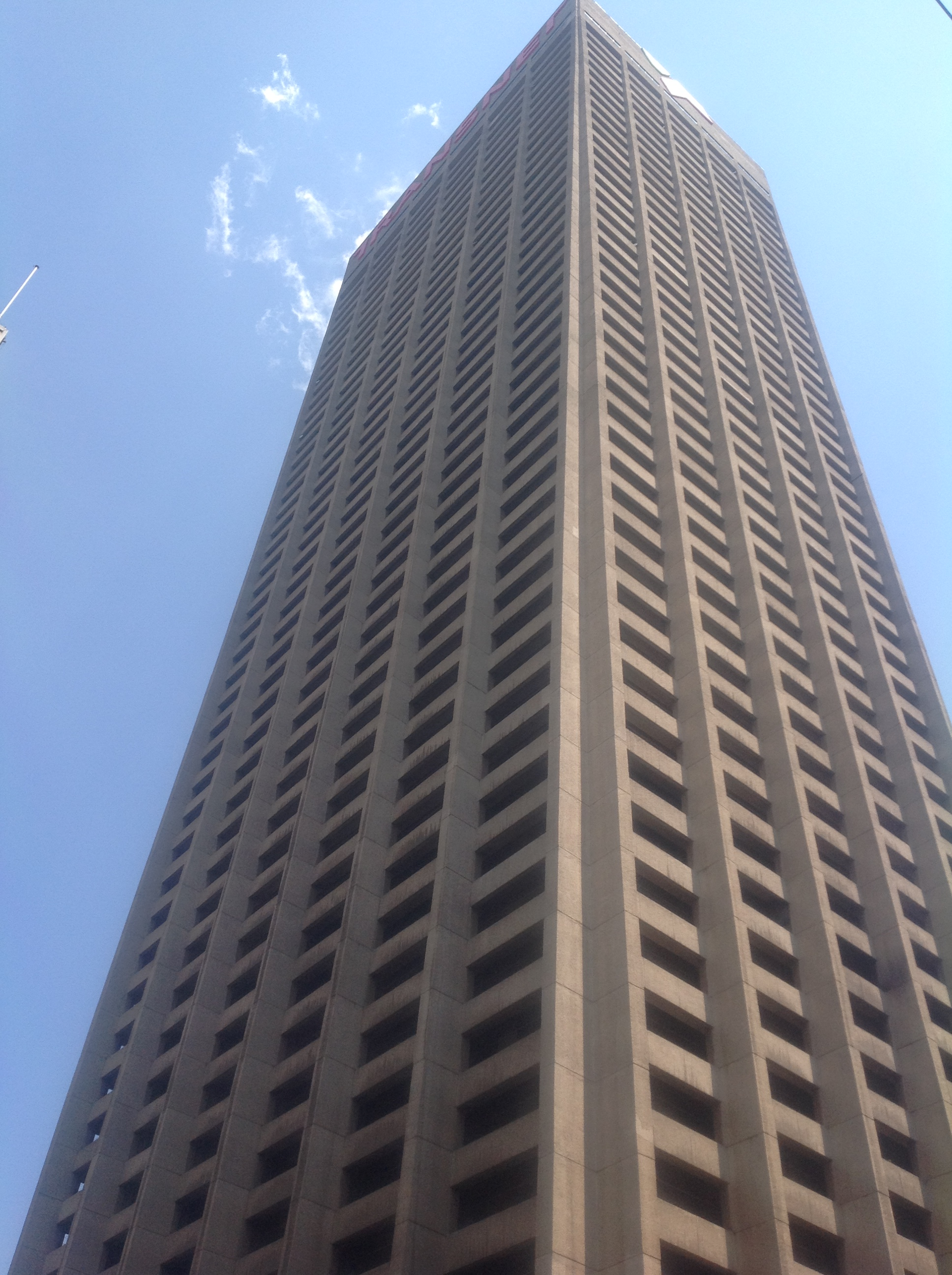

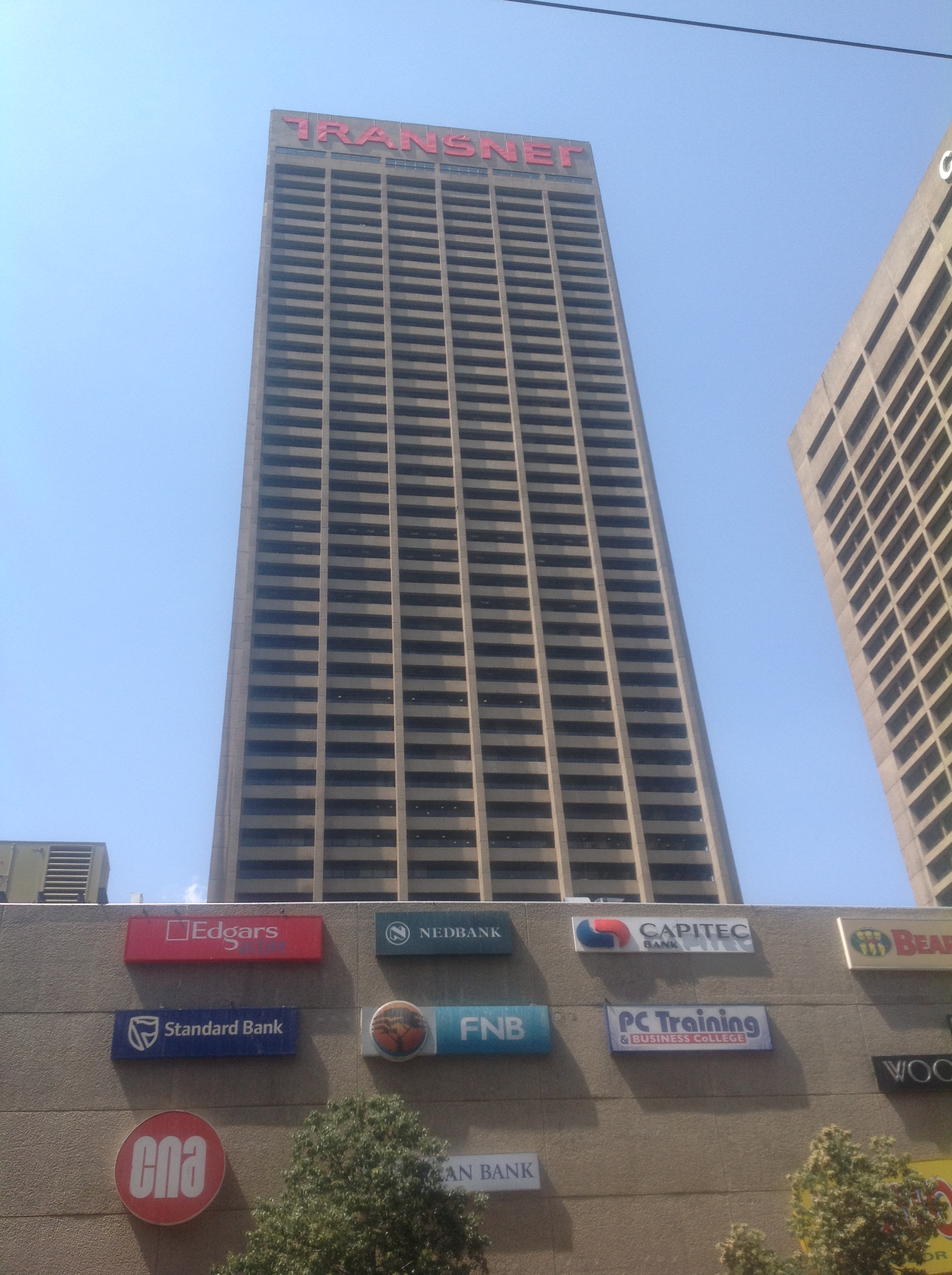

== See also ==
- List of tallest buildings in South Africa
- List of tallest buildings in Africa

Records
Preceded by Mirante do Vale	Tallest building in the Southern Hemisphere; 223 m (730 ft); 1973 – 1977	Succeeded by MLC Centre
Preceded by Sanlam Centre	Tallest building in Africa; 223 m (730 ft); 1973 – 2019	Succeeded by The Leonardo
Preceded by Sanlam Centre	Tallest building in South Africa; 223 m (730 ft); 1973 – 2019	Succeeded by The Leonardo
Preceded by Sanlam Centre	Tallest building in Johannesburg; 223 m (730 ft); 1973 – 2019	Succeeded by The Leonardo
Preceded by Tollman Towers	Building in Africa with the most floors 50; 1973 – 1975	Succeeded by Ponte City
