= Michelangelo Towers =

The Michelangelo Hotel
- The Michelangelo Towers

- Location within South Africa

General information
- Type: Residential
- Architectural style: Modernism
- Location: 8 Maude Street, Sandton, South Africa
- Coordinates: 26.1064°S 28.0540°E
- Groundbreaking: December, 2002

Height
- Height: 140 m (460 ft)

Technical details
- Floor count: 34

The Michelangelo Towers is a hotel building in Sandton, South Africa. It is a prominent structure in the Sandton skyline and is one of South Africa's elite hotels, having accommodated guests such as former United States President Barack Obama, Oprah Winfrey, Angelina Jolie, Mariah Carey, Paris Hilton, Kanye West, Lady Gaga and Justin Bieber.

== See also ==
View of Michelangelo Towers upper floors

- List of hotels in South Africa
- List of tallest buildings in South Africa
