= UCS Building =

Braamfontein Gate
- Interactive map of the Braamfontein Gate area

General information
- Status: Completed
- Type: Multi use, Residential
- Location: Johannesburg, South Africa
- Coordinates: 26°11′40″S 28°02′23″E
- Completed: 1976
- Owner: UTF

Height
- Roof: 128 m (420 ft)

Technical details
- Floor count: 29
- Lifts/elevators: 12

The Braamfontein Gate Building is a skyscraper in Braamfontein, Johannesburg, South Africa. It was built in 1976 to a height of 128 metres. The building was the headquarters of French oil company Total Elf Fina, and as such was known as Total House. When Total Elf Fina relocated to another building, it lost its naming rights. As of 2011, it housed the Head Office of the JSE-listed UCS Group Limited and various subsidiaries (Argility, UKS) The building was renovated in 2016 by its current owners and was converted to 390 highly desirable city apartments with amenities such as a business centre, cinema, fitness centre and an entertainment area with a luxurious swimming pool.
