= Old Mutual Centre =

Skyscraper in Durban, South Africa

- Interactive map of the Old Mutual Centre area

General information
- Status: Completed
- Type: Commercial
- Location: Durban, South Africa
- Coordinates: 29.85533°S 31.01888°E
- Opening: 1995

Height
- Roof: 130 m (427 ft)

Technical details
- Floor count: 33

Design and construction
- Architect: Stauch Vorster Architects

Old Mutual Centre is a skyscraper in Durban, South Africa. The 33 story building was completed in 1995.

== See also ==
- Skyscraper design and construction
- List of tallest buildings in Africa
