= Carlton Hotel (Johannesburg) =

Building in South Africa

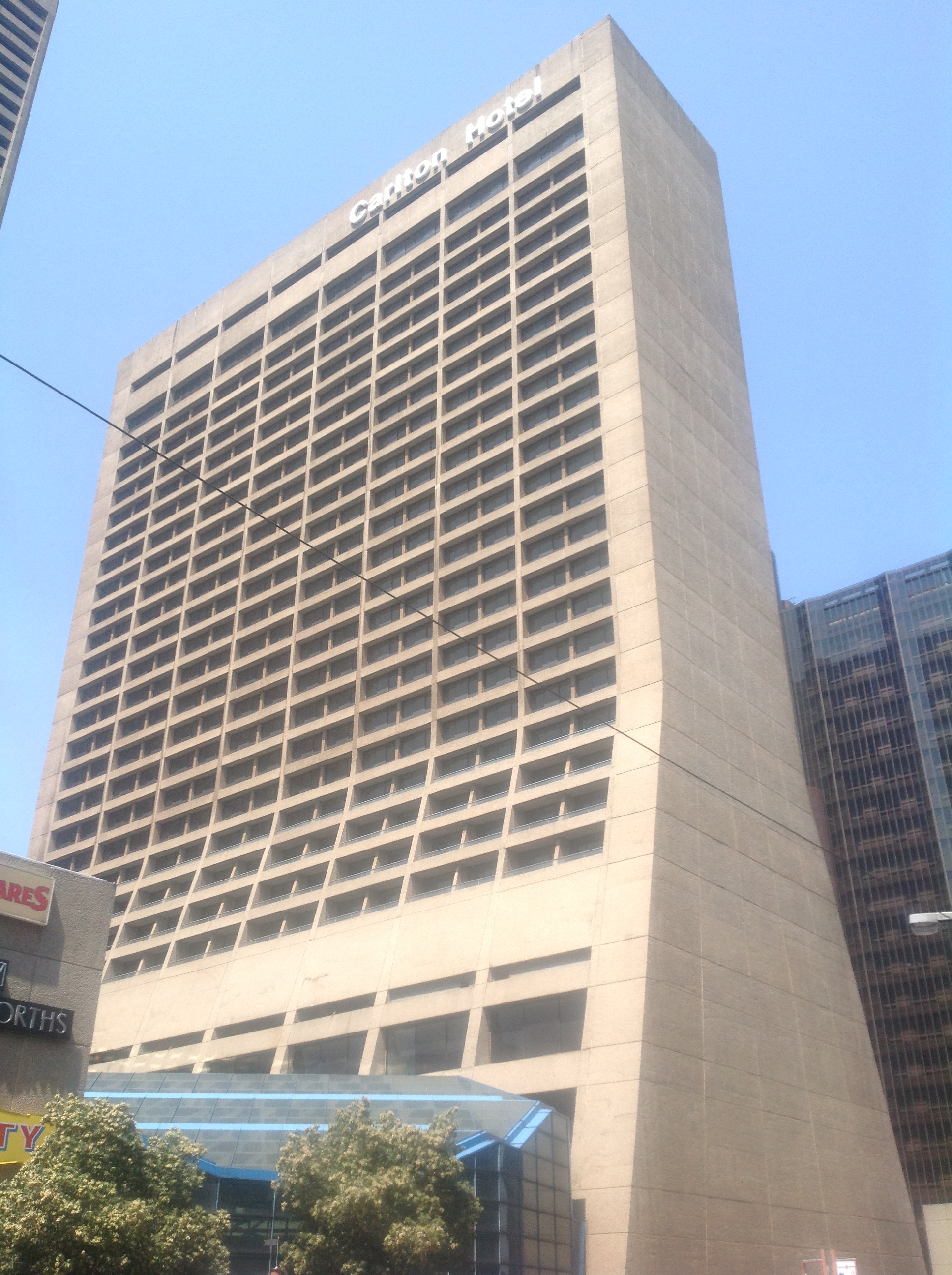
- Carlton Hotel
- Interactive map of the Carlton Hotel area

General information
- Location: Johannesburg, South Africa, Main Street
- Coordinates: 26°12′22″S 28°2′47″E
- Opening: October 1, 1972
- Closed: 1998; 28 years ago
- Owner: Transnet

Technical details
- Floor count: 30

Design and construction
- Architect: Gordon Bunshaft
- Developer: Anglo American

Other information
- Number of rooms: 670
- Number of suites: 64

The Carlton Hotel is a historic hotel in the Central Business District of Johannesburg, South Africa. It opened in 1972 as part of the enormous Carlton Centre complex, and has been closed since 1998. Its closure has been attributed to the decay of the Central Business District, resulting in a severe crime wave and the flight of the city's corporate offices north to areas like Sandton and Rosebank. This created a plethora of vacant rooms that were unable to be filled. The main hotel tower was closed in December 1997.

== History ==
=== First Carlton Hotel ===
The first Carlton Hotel was located two blocks away, at the corner of Eloff Street & Commissioner Street. Conceived in 1895 by mining magnate Barney Barnato as a huge, world-class luxury hotel with a theater, construction was finally begun by Barnato's heirs in 1903, without the theater, after delays caused by Barnato's death and the Boer War. The Carlton was constructed by the Barnadot-Joel Mining Company and opened on February 20, 1906. The six-story hotel was the finest in southern Africa, with a telephone in every room and an early form of air conditioning. It hosted many celebrities, including King George VI, Queen Elizabeth, and the young Princesses Elizabeth and Margaret in 1947. The original hotel was demolished in 1963.

=== Construction of Carlton Centre ===
South African Breweries planned to replace the old Carlton with a new hotel on a sprawling double-block site they owned nearby at Main Street & Kruis Street, where the Castle Brewery had been located, and where the current hotel now stands. However, Harry Oppenheimer, chairman of Anglo American, convinced SAB to rethink the project as an immense commercial development to rival New York's Rockefeller Center. The two companies, each among the biggest in South Africa, secretly assembled a six-acre parcel covering five and a half city blocks. The city council gave permission for the two blocks of the brewery and the two blocks north to be consolidated into one superblock for the complex.

The enormous, modern Carlton Centre, built at a cost of R88 million, would contain a fifty-story office tower, the tallest in Africa; the thirty-story luxury Carlton Hotel; a five-story Garlicks department store; a huge three-and-a-half-acre public plaza with a two-story underground shopping centre beneath it containing 140 shops; parking garages with space for 2000 cars; and an adjacent 57,000 square-foot exhibition centre with an indoor ice skating rink on the top level. The complex was designed by noted American architect Gordon Bunshaft, of the internationally renowned firm of Skidmore, Owings & Merrill, working in conjunction with the local Johannesburg firm of Rhodes-Harrison Hoffe and Partners. Anglo American bought out SAB's share of the project in 1969, while it was still under construction.

=== Second Carlton Hotel ===
The new Carlton Hotel opened for business on October 1, 1972, managed by Western International Hotels, which also owned an 11 percent stake in the hotel. It celebrated its grand opening on November 21, 1972. During its twenty-five years in operation, the five-star hotel was the finest in South Africa and hosted celebrities including Henry Kissinger, François Mitterrand, Hillary Clinton, Margaret Thatcher, Whitney Houston and Mick Jagger. Its restaurant, The Three Ships, was renowned as one of the best in Johannesburg.

In the wake of the 1976 Soweto uprising, Harry Frederick Oppenheimer and Afrikaner business tycoon Anton Rupert held a conference at the Carlton on November 29–30, 1976 to discuss urban renewal and the building of a black middle class in the country to protect the existing system. The Urban Foundation was founded as a result.

On December 7, 1977, an anti-apartheid activist bombed a restaurant in the Carlton Centre, adjacent to the hotel, injuring several people and blowing off his own right hand.

On November 22, 1979, South Africa's new Prime Minister P.W. Botha convened a gathering at the hotel of the entire cabinet and heads of government departments, along with 300 influential business leaders, which became known as the Carlton Conference. Botha outlined his concept of a Constellation of Southern African States (CONSAS) which would take on the "Marxist threat" he perceived in the region, and he declared his intention that businesses should work more closely with his government to maintain the current system, saying the struggle was 20% military and 80% social, political and economic.

On May 19, 1980, three men held up the hotel with 25 sticks of dynamite, wired and set to go off electrically in their room on the 15th floor. After a six-hour standoff, during which the men ate lunch, drank beer, smoked marijuana and waved to pedestrians on the street below, they were finally overpowered by police anti-terrorist units and the dynamite was neutralized.

In August 1982, the hotel opened a 63-room luxury annex directly across Kruis Street, connected by a skybridge — the Carlton Court.

By the mid-1980s, South Africa was becoming increasingly isolated due to its highly controversial policy of apartheid. As a result, the Carlton Hotel saw a huge drop in foreign travelers and operated at a loss from 1984 to 1987, with only a 47 percent occupancy rate in 1987. With popular sentiment in the United States demanding firms divest themselves of holdings in South Africa, Westin sold its ownership stake in the hotel to Anglo American in 1986.

In August 1987, over 340,000 black coal and gold miners went on strike. Negotiations between the mine owners, including Anglo American, and the strikers, led by future South African President Cyril Ramaphosa, were held at the Carlton. The strike ended after three weeks, when the companies threatened to fire all of the miners, having already fired over 50,000, and the remainder returned to work.

Facing continued pressure in the US to end business ties of any kind with South Africa, Westin severed its management contract for the Carlton on April 20, 1988 and Anglo American began operating the hotel independently. A month later, on May 28, 1988, 245 uniformed black Carlton employees were arrested while protesting outside the hotel. The employees had gone on strike, unaware that Westin had sold its ownership stake two years earlier, and demanding severance pay from the chain, as other divesting foreign firms had given at the time. With foreign guests looking on, including a huge convention of international travel agents brought in to try and increase tourism to South Africa, the protest was violently broken up by police using batons and dogs, operating under authority of the 1982 Internal Security Act, which gave them power to break up almost any public gathering. The hotel paid $50 fines for each protester and they were released later that day.

Anglo American chairman Gavin Relly, who had traveled to Zambia in 1985 to secretly negotiate with the ANC, against the wishes of President P.W. Botha, convened a meeting of 350 leading South African bankers and industrialists with high-level ANC officials to discuss a "post-apartheid South Africa" at the Carlton on May 23, 1990, soon after Nelson Mandela's release from prison. Mandela gave a joint press conference with Relly at the hotel, in which Mandela backed off from the ANC's former pledge to nationalize the country's mines and redistribute its wealth.

The National Peace Accord, a key step in reducing violence during the negotiations to end apartheid, attended by Mandela, F. W. de Klerk, and Zulu leader Mangosuthu Buthelezi, was signed at the Carlton by representatives of twenty-seven political organizations and national and homeland governments on September 14, 1991.

On January 10, 1992, Mandela and Paul Simon held a banquet attended by Whoopi Goldberg and South African musician Johnny Clegg to celebrate the end of the cultural boycotts, during which artists had refused to play in apartheid South Africa. Simon then gave a concert in the city attended by over 75,000 fans.

Later in 1992, UN Secretary-General Boutros Boutros-Ghali sent former US Secretary of State Cyrus Vance to Johannesburg. Vance set up his offices in the Carlton, where he coordinated negotiations that had become deadlocked between the major anti-apartheid organizations and political parties in South Africa. In April 1994, Henry Kissinger and former British Foreign Secretary Lord Carrington also conducted meetings at the Carlton between the opposing factions.

Mandela held his 75th birthday celebration in the hotel's ballroom on July 17, 1993, attended by over 650 guests.

The hotel served as the victory celebration headquarters for the African National Congress in the 1994 election. On May 2, 1994, Nelson Mandela gave a speech to a cheering crowd in the Carlton's Grand Ballroom announcing that he had won the election and would be South Africa's next president and declaring South Africa to be "free at last", in the words of Martin Luther King Jr., whose widow (Coretta Scott King) and son (Martin Luther King III) were in attendance. Hearings of the Truth and Reconciliation Commission on Business and Apartheid were later held at the Carlton from November 11–13, 1997.

Unfortunately, the decay of the Central Business District, resulting in a severe crime wave and the flight of the city's corporate offices north to areas like Sandton and Rosebank, soon made the towering hotel's hundreds of rooms impossible to fill. In June 1997, two hotel employees murdered the hotel's assistant banquet manager and hid his body in the hotel's linen room, after the manager found them drinking while on duty. The two killers were later sentenced to 23 years in jail each. Anglo American finally closed the main hotel tower in December 1997, after losing $4 million that year alone on the Carlton.

=== Post-closure ===
The hotel's contents were sold and used to furnish the Protea Hotel at Gold Reef City, where a replica of The Three Ships restaurant was opened. The hotel's staff of 276 were laid off, with 59 re-employed on contract to run the smaller Carlton Court annex across the street and the hotel's Koffiehuis cafe, which were temporarily kept open while Anglo American explored plans to sell 70 percent of the hotel to a group of Malaysian and local investors, who planned to spend $120 million to convert the Carlton to a casino. The hotel failed to receive its hoped-for casino license, the plans fell apart, and the annex closed, too, in April 1998.

Anglo American sold the entire Carlton Centre complex to Transnet in 1999 for R33 million, a fraction of what it originally cost to construct. The office tower and shopping centre remain in use, but while various plans have been floated in the years since to refurbish the Carlton Hotel, it currently sits empty. Transnet has, however, occasionally rented out the hotel for functions and film shoots. Scenes from the 2003 period crime thriller Stander were filmed at the hotel. The Absa Cup launch was held at the hotel in February 2005. Volkswagen held the launch of their Golf 5 GTI in the Carlton's fourth-floor ballroom in April 2005. The first season of the South African edition of the popular reality series Strictly Come Dancing was filmed in the ballroom in February and March, 2006. Scenes from the 2009 science fiction film District 9 were also shot at the hotel and around Carlton Centre, which served as the headquarters of the evil MNU organization in the film.
