= Absa Tower =

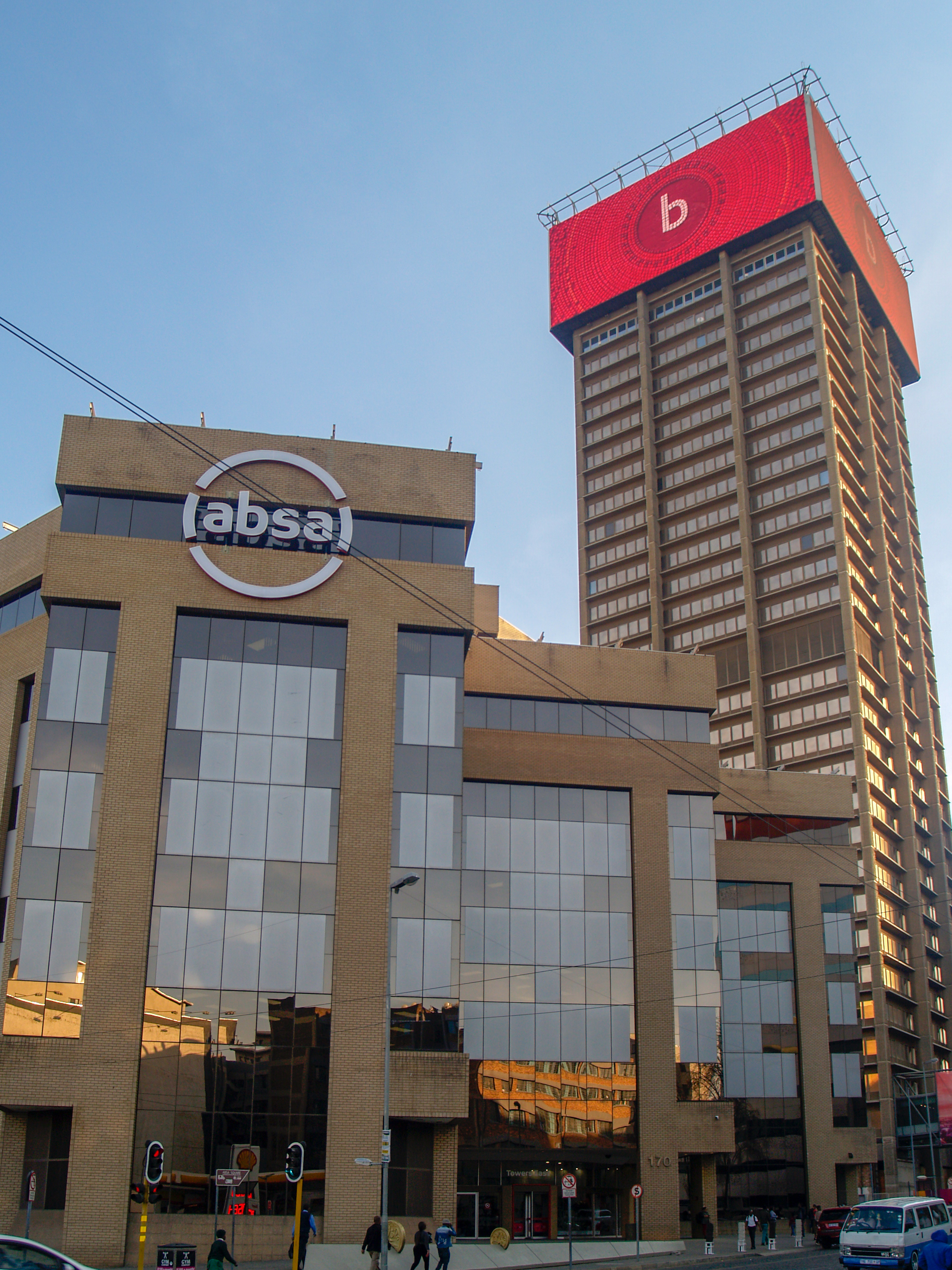
- Interactive map of the Absa Tower area

General information
- Status: Completed
- Type: Office
- Architectural style: Modern
- Location: Johannesburg, South Africa, 160 Main Street
- Coordinates: 26.20535°S 28.04980°E
- Completed: 1970
- Opening: 1970
- Owner: Absa Group Limited

Height
- Architectural: 140 metres (460 ft)
- Tip: 140 metres (460 ft)
- Roof: 140 metres (460 ft)

Technical details
- Floor count: 31

The Amalgamated Banks of South Africa Tower (simply Absa Tower or ABSA Tower) is an office skyscraper in the Central Business District of Johannesburg, South Africa. It is 31 storeys tall. It is also the headquarters of Absa Group Limited.
