= Johannesburg CBD =

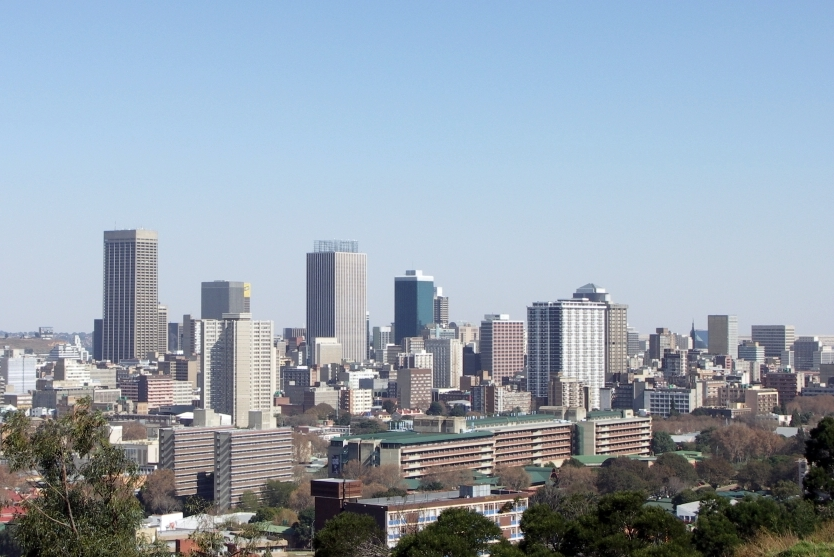
- The Central Business District

- Location within Gauteng Location within South Africa
- Coordinates: 26°12′S 28°2′E
- Country: South Africa
- Province: Gauteng
- Municipality: City of Johannesburg
- Main Place: Johannesburg
- Time zone: UTC+2 (SAST)

The Johannesburg Central Business District, commonly called Johannesburg CBD, is one of the main business centres of Johannesburg, South Africa. It is the densest collection of skyscrapers in Africa, however, due to white flight and urban blight, many of the buildings are unoccupied as tenants have left for more secure locations in the Northern Suburbs, in particular Sandton and Rosebank. There are significant movements to revive the area.

== History ==
The area that is currently the Central Business District has been the central area of Johannesburg nearly since its inception. Its central location in the city as well as careful planning led to it being chosen as the best location for residential and commercial development, especially during the economically prosperous 1960s and 1970s. Many large commercial products were completed in this period, such as the Carlton Centre, the tallest building in Africa for 46 years (currently the fifth tallest).

Under apartheid, the Central Business District was classified as a whites-only area, meaning that black people were allowed to work and shop there but could not live there. Application of the Group Areas Act became very lax in the 1980s, among other things because courts were not able to handle all the cases, and when the Act was abolished even more disadvantaged black people moved into the City Centre, often taking over whole buildings by overfilling them with people that the previous middle-class white tenants found unacceptable neighbours.

This is not only true of previously established residential areas such as Hillbrow on the periphery of the CBD but also of former office blocks in the heart of the CBD, that were converted to residential accommodation as businesses fled the centre in the late-1980s and 1990s. A crime wave swept through the city as businesses left the CBD, which made walking around the area dangerous. Many businesses and people fled the Central Business District and surrounding areas such as Braamfontein, Hillbrow, and Yeoville for more secured houses or offices in the Northern Suburbs.

By the late 1990s, the Central Business District was a no-go zone and a virtual ghost town. All its former glory was lost, and the city was shattered by the loss of the Carlton Hotel. The situation has improved since. The provincial government of Gauteng is based in the CBD as are several large banks.

== Gentrification ==
There have been significant movements to redevelop the city centre. The Johannesburg city government installed CCTV cameras all over the Central Business District, which decreased crime dramatically. Several historical buildings have also been developed and turned into condominiums, which developers hope will draw new residents to the area. The process of gentrification and redevelopment is ongoing as of 2016.
