= List of tallest buildings in Africa =

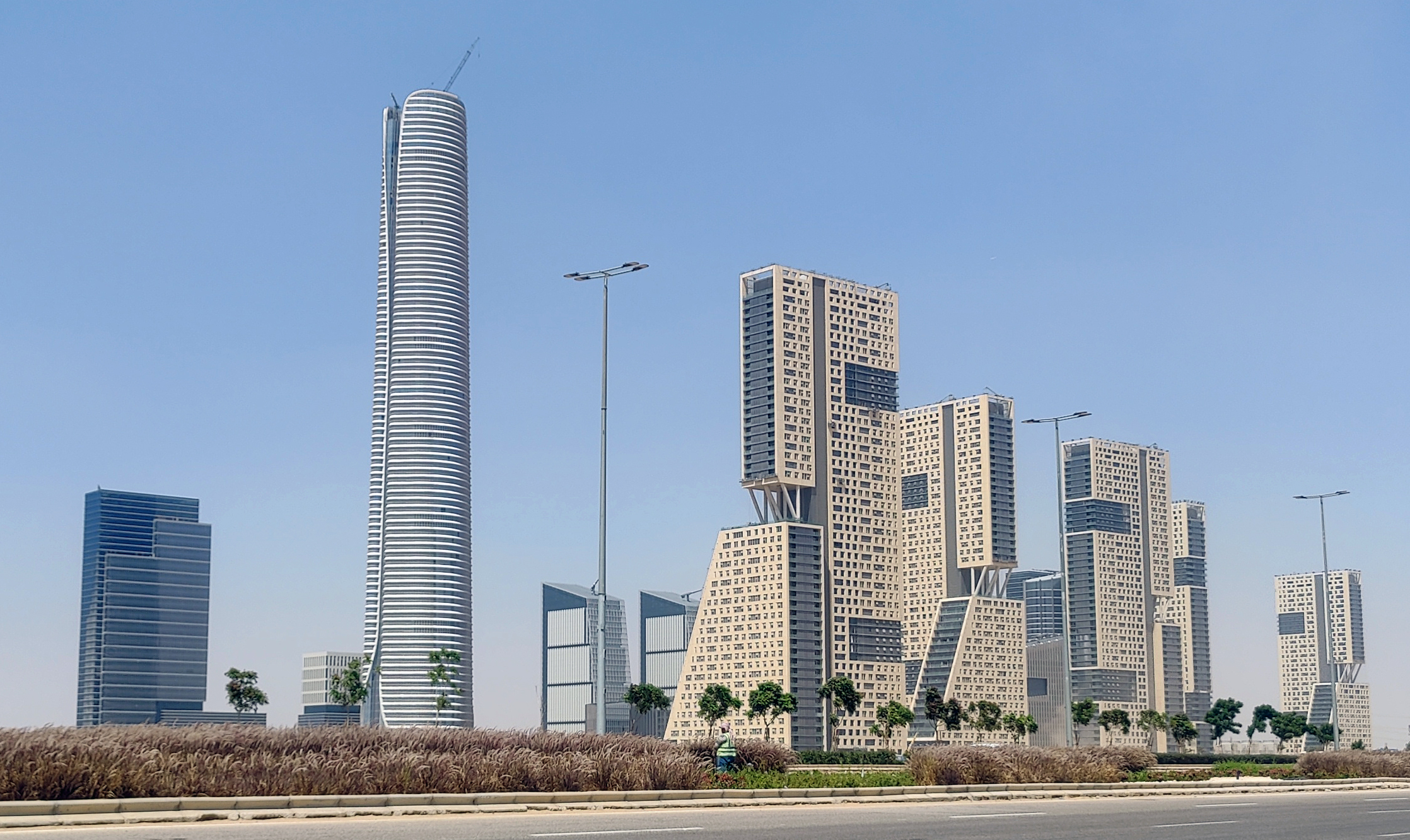
The New Capital, Egypt

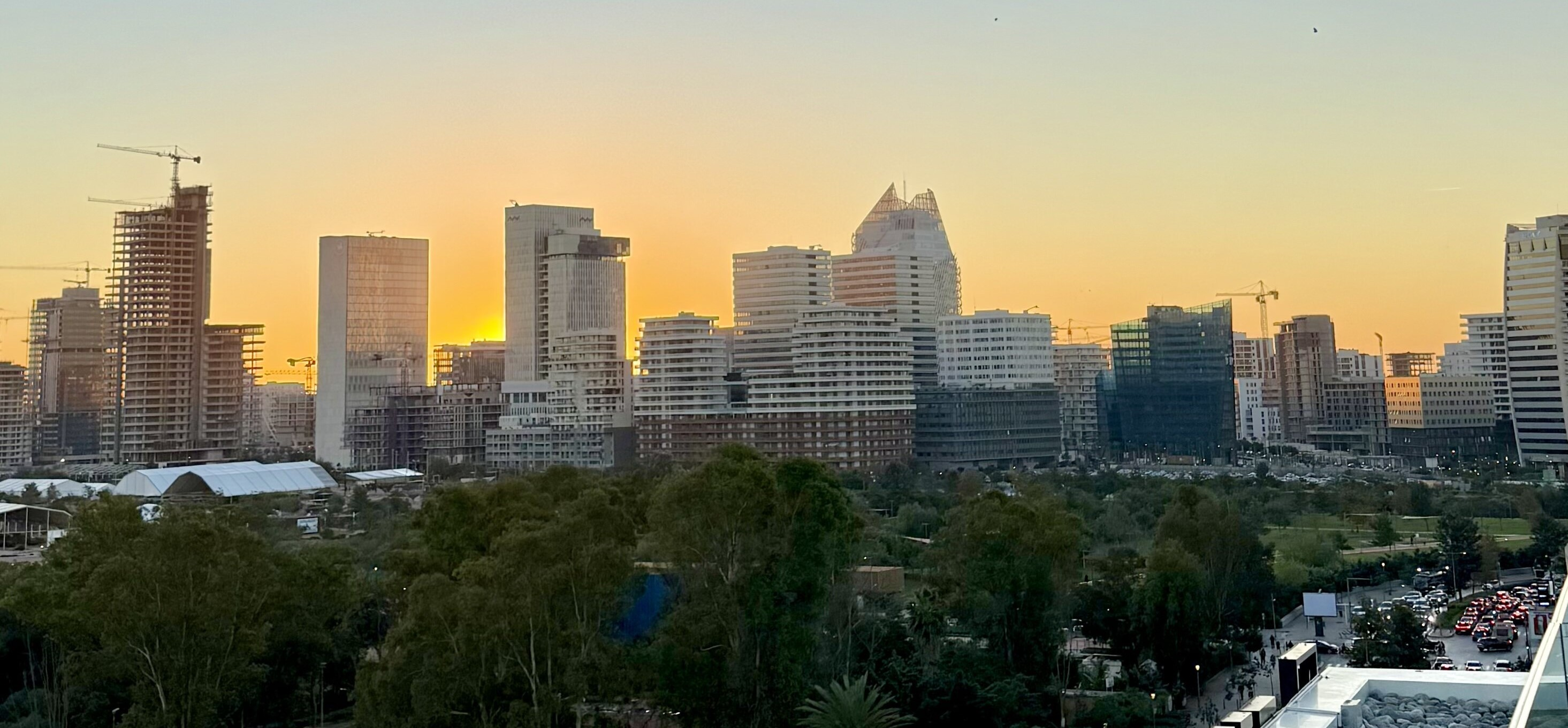
Casablanca, Morocco

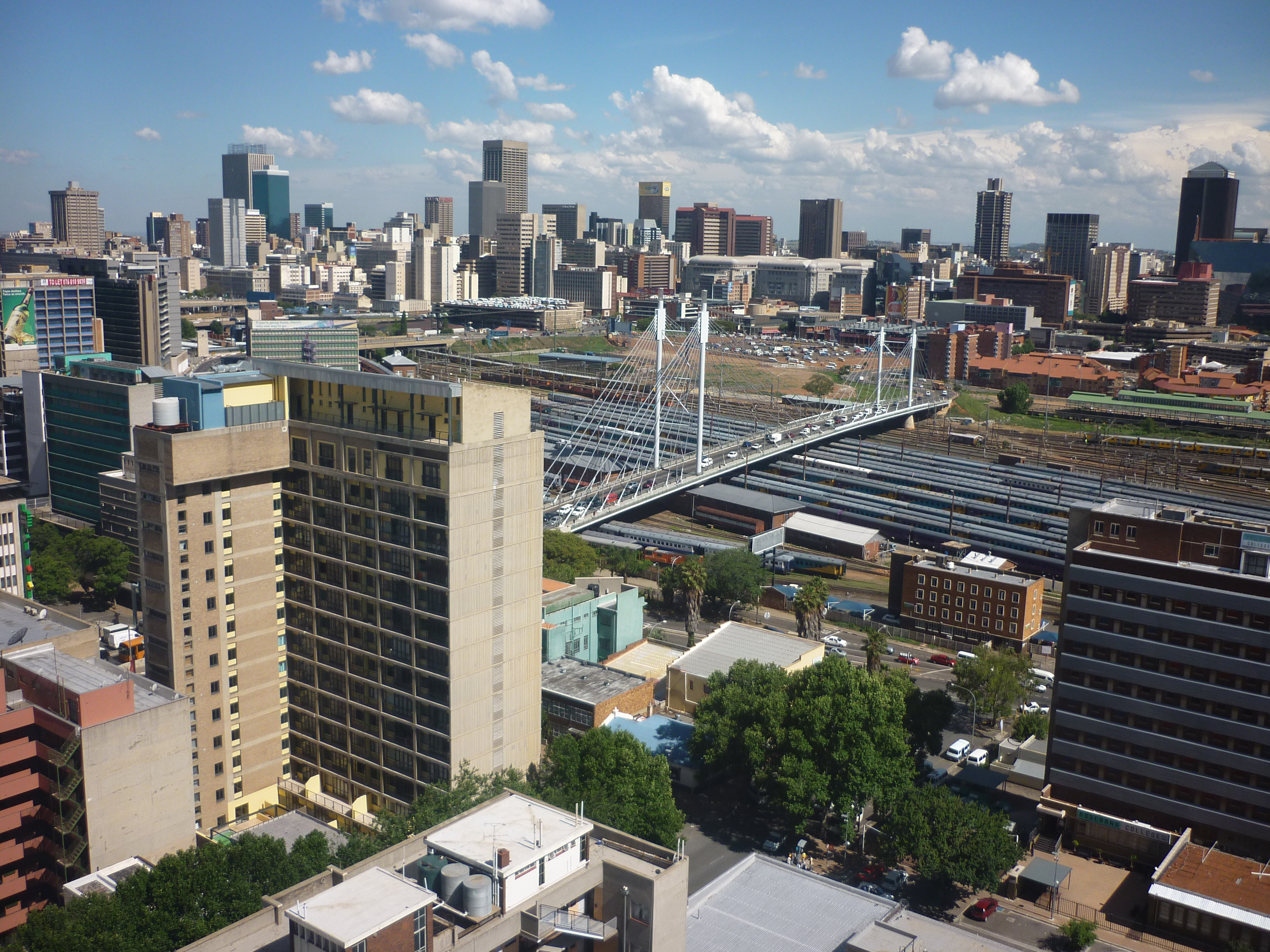
Johannesburg, South Africa

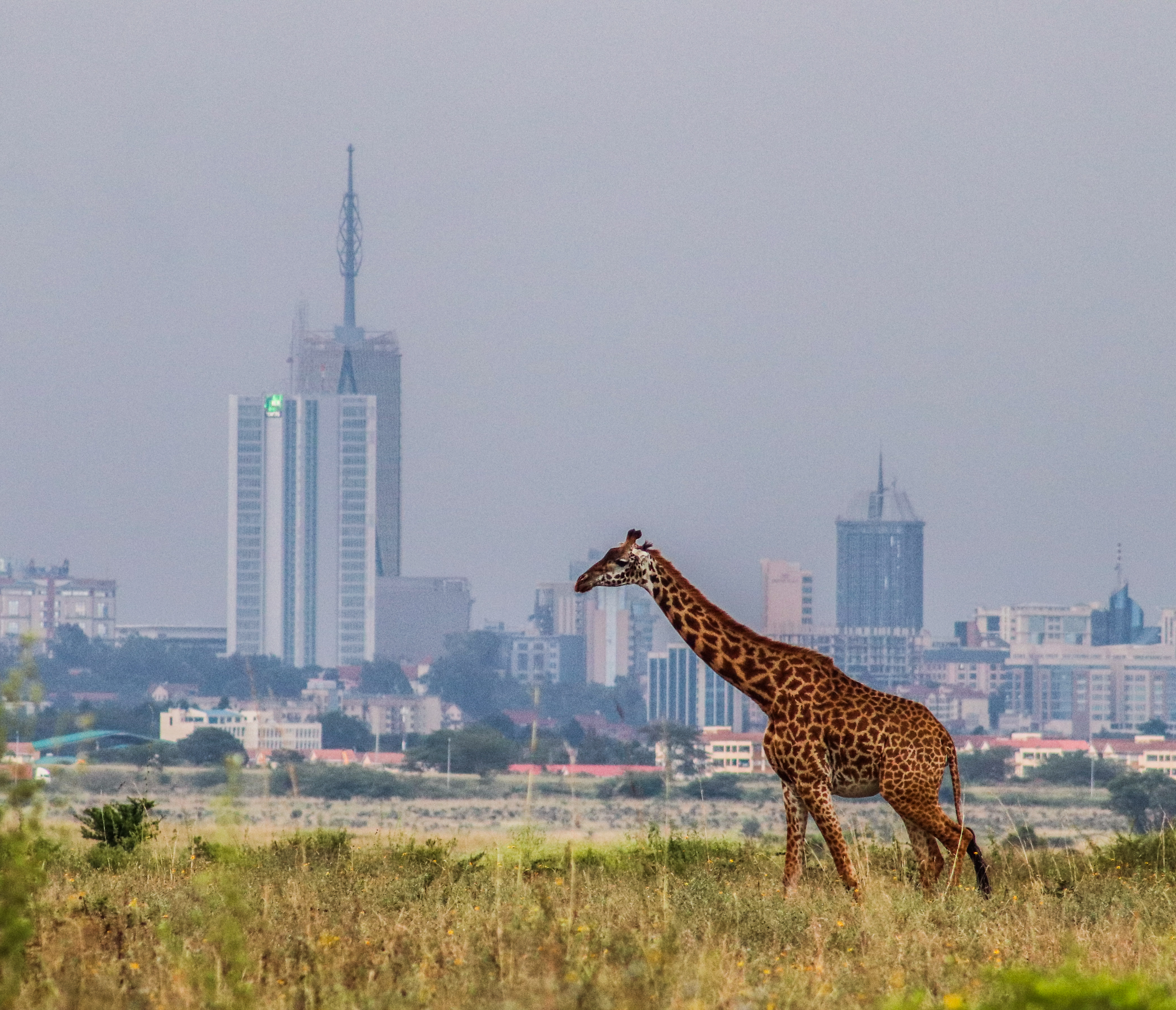
Nairobi, Kenya

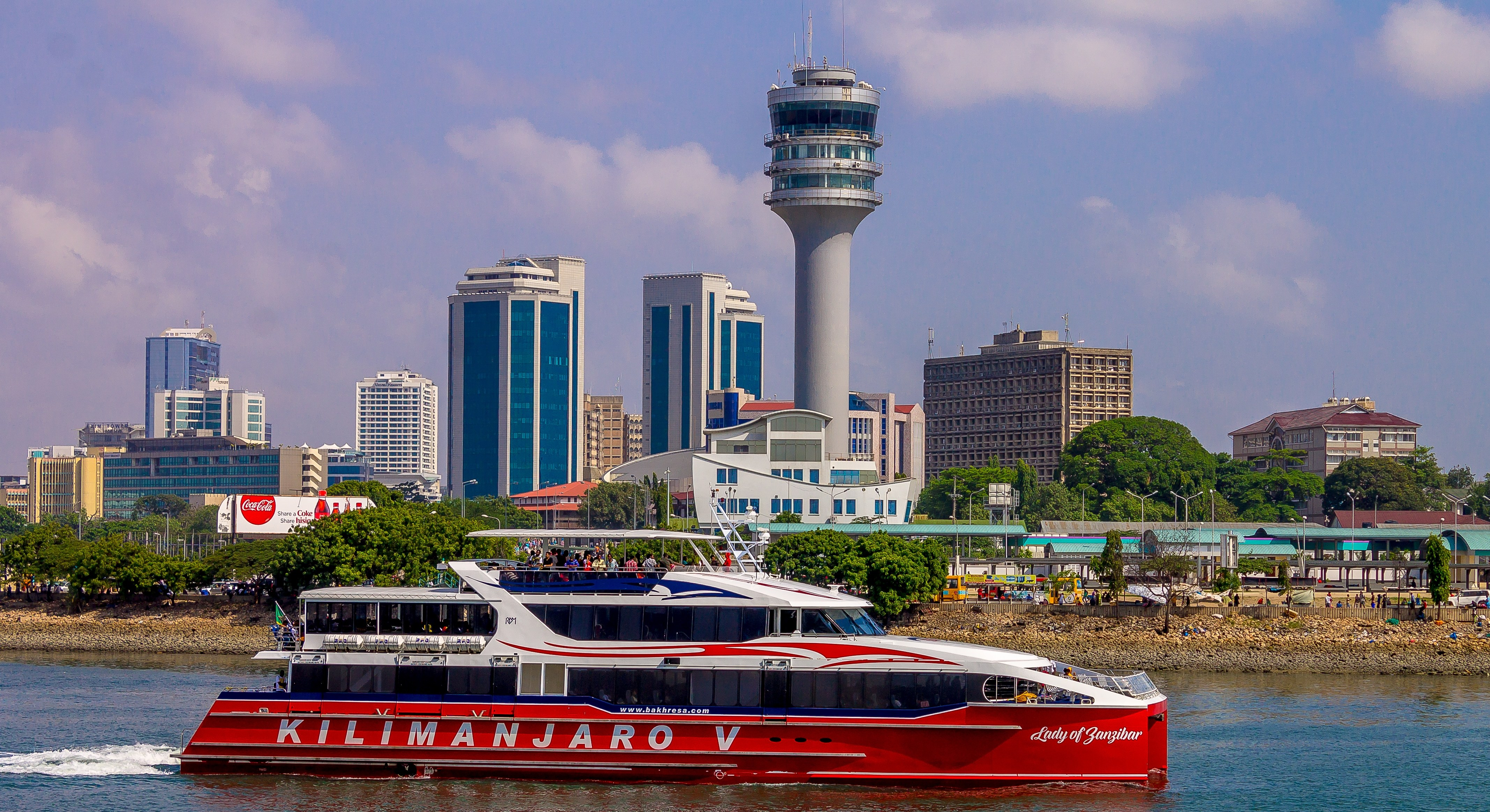
Dar es Salaam, Tanzania

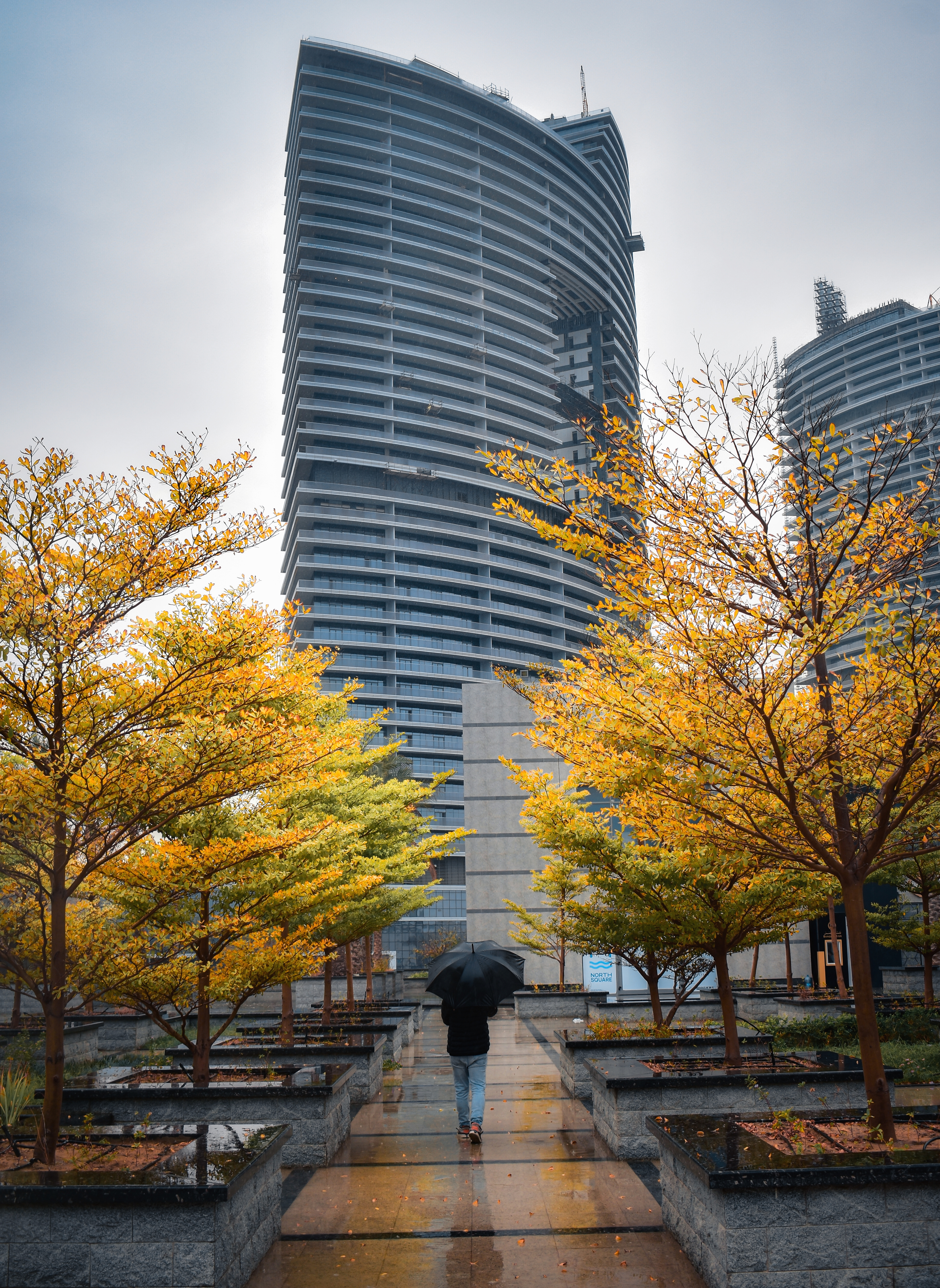
New Alamein, Egypt

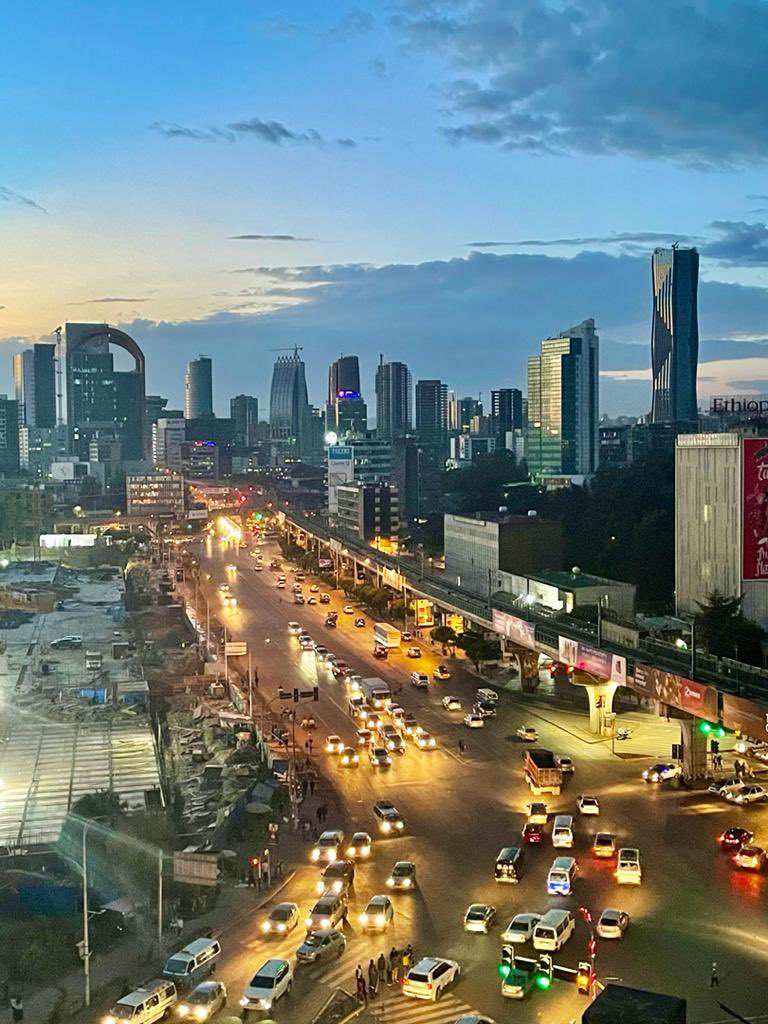
Addis Ababa, Ethiopia

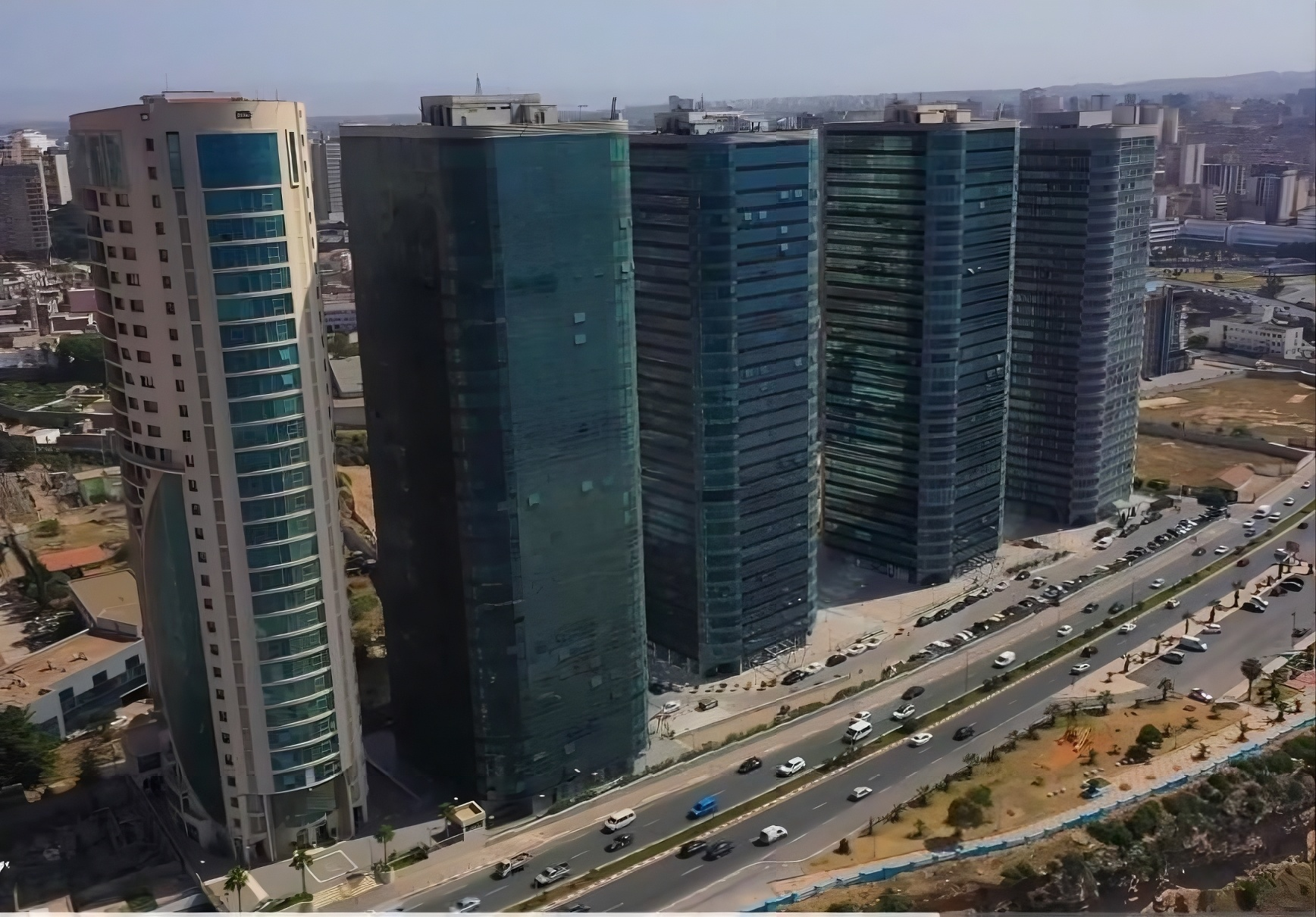
Oran, Algeria

This article ranks the tallest buildings in Africa by height. Historically, only a few major financial and commercial hubs had prominent skylines, such as Cairo, Johannesburg, Lagos, and Nairobi. Since the 2000s, however, skyscrapers have been built in many other African cities, including The New Capital, Casablanca, Algiers, New Alamein, Durban, Cape Town, Maputo, Salé, Addis Ababa, Dar es Salaam, Alexandria, Abidjan, Luanda, and Port Louis. Compared to other continents, Africa has a limited number of skyscrapers, with only about 40 skyscrapers exceeding 150 m (492 ft) in height. This is primarily due to low economic demand, high construction costs, and a general urban preference for sprawling outward rather than building upward. The tallest skyscraper on the continent is the Iconic Tower in The New Capital, Egypt, which stands at 393.8 m (1,292 ft) tall.

== Tallest buildings ==
This list ranks completed and topped-out buildings in Africa that stand at least 400 ft (122 m) tall, based on standard height measurements by the CTBUH. This includes spires and architectural details, but excludes antenna masts. The "Year" column indicates when a building reached completion. Non-habitable structures or buildings with very few floors, such as traditional minarets, observation towers, and churches, are included solely for comparison purposes, but they are not ranked.

Was the tallest building in Africa upon completion
Indicates buildings that have been topped out but not yet completed

Rank	Name	Image	Height m (ft)	Floors	Year	Country	City	Notes
1	Iconic Tower		393.8 m (1,292 ft)	77	2024	Egypt	The New Capital	Tallest building in Africa since 2024. Tallest building completed in Africa in the 2020s. 46th-tallest building in the world.
2	Alamein Iconic Tower		291.8 m (957 ft)	67	2026	Egypt	New Alamein	Tallest building in New Alamein and the tallest residential building in Africa. Topped out in October 2024.
3	Great Mosque of Algiers Tower		265 m (869 ft)	37	2019	Algeria	Algiers	Tallest building in Algeria and the tallest minaret in the world. Tallest building in Africa from 2019 to 2024. Tallest building completed in Africa in the 2010s.
4	Mohammed VI Tower		250 m (820 ft)	55	2023	Morocco	Salé	Tallest building in Morocco. Formerly known as BMCE Tower.
5	The Leonardo		234 m (768 ft)	56	2019	South Africa	Johannesburg	Tallest building in South Africa and Sub-Saharan Africa. Tallest building in Africa for a brief period in 2019.
6	Carlton Centre		223 m (732 ft)	50	1973	South Africa	Johannesburg	Tallest office building in Africa. Tallest building in Africa from 1973 to 2019. Tallest building in Southern Hemisphere from 1973 to 1977. Tallest building completed in Africa in the 1970s.
—	Hassan II Mosque		210 m (689 ft)	N/A	1993	Morocco	Casablanca	Not a habitable building; included for comparison purposes. Tallest minaret in the world from 1993 to 2019.
7	Commercial Bank of Ethiopia Headquarters		209.3 m (687 ft)	53	2022	Ethiopia	Addis Ababa	Tallest building in Ethiopia and East Africa.
8=	Alamein Downtown Towers D01 Tower 1		207.8 m (682 ft)	56	2026	Egypt	New Alamein	
8=	Alamein Downtown Towers D01 Tower 2		207.8 m (682 ft)	56	2026	Egypt	New Alamein	
8=	Alamein Downtown Towers D01 Tower 3		207.8 m (682 ft)	56	2026	Egypt	New Alamein	
8=	Alamein Downtown Towers D01 Tower 4		207.8 m (682 ft)	56	2026	Egypt	New Alamein	
12	Britam Tower		200.1 m (656 ft)	31	2017	Kenya	Nairobi	Tallest building in Kenya.
13	New Administrative Capital Building D01		196 m (643 ft)	49	2024	Egypt	The New Capital	Tallest residential building in Africa from 2024 to 2026.
14	Global Trade Center Office Tower		184 m (604 ft)	43	2021	Kenya	Nairobi	Formerly known as AVIC International African Headquarters.
15=	New Administrative Capital Building D02		176 m (577 ft)	45	2024	Egypt	The New Capital	
15=	New Administrative Capital Building D03		176 m (577 ft)	45	2024	Egypt	The New Capital	
17	New Administrative Capital Building C01		174 m (571 ft)	35	2024	Egypt	The New Capital	Tallest office building in Egypt.
18	Ponte City Apartments		172.8 m (567 ft)	54	1975	South Africa	Johannesburg	Tallest residential building in South Africa. Tallest residential building in Africa from 1975 to 2024.
19=	Gate Towers East		170 m (558 ft)	44	2025	Egypt	New Alamein	
19=	Gate Towers West		170 m (558 ft)	44	2025	Egypt	New Alamein	
19=	New Administrative Capital Building C04		170 m (558 ft)	34	2024	Egypt	The New Capital	
22	Fouda Tower		166 m (545 ft)	50	N/D	Egypt	Cairo	Tallest building in Cairo. Topped out, but never completed due to the absence of an underground parking garage. Tallest unused building in Africa.
23	UAP Old Mutual Tower		163 m (535 ft)	33	2016	Kenya	Nairobi	Tallest building in Kenya from 2016 to 2017.
24	NECOM House		160.3 m (526 ft)	32	1979	Nigeria	Lagos	Tallest building in Nigeria and West Africa. Formerly known as NET Building. 3rd-tallest building in Africa at the time of its completion.
25=	PPF Headquarters		160 m (525 ft)	37	2019	Tanzania	Dar es Salaam	Tallest building in Tanzania.
25=	New Administrative Capital Building C11		160 m (525 ft)	27	2025	Egypt	The New Capital	
25=	New Administrative Capital Building C12		160 m (525 ft)	27	2024	Egypt	The New Capital	
28=	New Administrative Capital Building C07		159.9 m (525 ft)	32	2024	Egypt	The New Capital	
28=	New Administrative Capital Building C08		159.9 m (525 ft)	32	2024	Egypt	The New Capital	
30	New Administrative Capital Building D04		159.8 m (524 ft)	40	2024	Egypt	The New Capital	
31	NIB Bank Headquarters		159 m (522 ft)	37	2021	Ethiopia	Addis Ababa	Tallest building in Ethiopia from 2021 to 2022.
—	Basilica of Our Lady of Peace		158 m (518 ft)	N/A	1990	Ivory Coast	Yamoussoukro	Largest church in the world by total area. 3rd-tallest church in the world.
32	Tanzania Ports Authority Headquarters		157 m (515 ft)	40	2016	Tanzania	Dar es Salaam	Tallest building in Tanzania from 2016 to 2019.
33=	El Salam Tower		155 m (509 ft)	36	N/D	Egypt	Alexandria	Tallest building in Alexandria.
33=	NSSF Pension Towers		155 m (509 ft)	32	2025	Uganda	Kampala	Tallest building in Uganda.
35=	PSPF Commercial Tower A		152.7 m (501 ft)	35	2014	Tanzania	Dar es Salaam	Tallest building in Tanzania from 2014 to 2016, along with PSPF Commercial Tower B.
35=	PSPF Commercial Tower B		152.7 m (501 ft)	35	2014	Tanzania	Dar es Salaam	Tallest building in Tanzania from 2014 to 2016, along with PSPF Commercial Tower A.
37	New Administrative Capital Building D05		152.5 m (500 ft)	38	2024	Egypt	The New Capital	
38	Marble Towers		152.1 m (499 ft)	32	1973	South Africa	Johannesburg	Tallest building in Africa for a brief period in 1973.
39	Pearl Dawn		152 m (499 ft)	31	2010	South Africa	Durban	Tallest building in South Africa outside of Johannesburg.
40	Radio Park Building		150.9 m (495 ft)	33	1975	South Africa	Johannesburg	Also known as South African Broadcasting Corporation Building. 166.4 m (546 ft) tall with antenna.
41	88 Nairobi Condominium Tower		150 m (492 ft)	48	2026	Kenya	Nairobi	Tallest residential building in Kenya.
42	South African Reserve Bank Building		148 m (486 ft)	38	1988	South Africa	Pretoria	Tallest building in Pretoria. Tallest building completed in Africa in the 1980s.
43	88 on Field		146.5 m (481 ft)	26	1985	South Africa	Durban	Designed by Murphy/Jahn Architects.
44	Azuri One		146 m (479 ft)	33	2023	Nigeria	Lagos	Tallest residential building in Nigeria.
45=	Mwalimu Nyerere Foundation Square		145 m (476 ft)	31	2019	Tanzania	Dar es Salaam	
45=	IMOB Business Tower		145 m (476 ft)	35	2018	Angola	Luanda	Tallest building in Angola.
47	Burj Bulaya Office Tower 1		144 m (472 ft)	34	2007	Libya	Tripoli	Tallest building in Libya. Tallest building completed in Africa in the 2000s.
48=	Ministry of Foreign Affairs		143 m (469 ft)	39	1994	Egypt	Cairo	Tallest building in Egypt from 1994 to 2024.
48=	Global Trade Center Hotel Tower		143 m (469 ft)	35	2021	Kenya	Nairobi	
50=	Hilton Cairo Grand Nile		142 m (466 ft)	41	2002	Egypt	Cairo	
50=	Nile City North Tower		142 m (466 ft)	34	2002	Egypt	Cairo	
50=	Nile City South Tower		142 m (466 ft)	34	2002	Egypt	Cairo	
53	Sandton City Office Tower		141 m (463 ft)	22	1973	South Africa	Johannesburg	
54=	El Maadi Residential Tower 13		140 m (459 ft)	42	1987	Egypt	Cairo	Tallest building in Egypt from 1987 to 1994, along with El Maadi Residential Towers 14–18.
54=	El Maadi Residential Tower 14		140 m (459 ft)	42	1987	Egypt	Cairo	
54=	El Maadi Residential Tower 15		140 m (459 ft)	42	1987	Egypt	Cairo	
54=	El Maadi Residential Tower 16		140 m (459 ft)	42	1987	Egypt	Cairo	
54=	El Maadi Residential Tower 17		140 m (459 ft)	42	1987	Egypt	Cairo	
54=	El Maadi Residential Tower 18		140 m (459 ft)	42	1987	Egypt	Cairo	
54=	Kwadukuza Egoli Hotel Tower 1		140 m (459 ft)	40	1985	South Africa	Johannesburg	Tallest hotel in Africa. Also known as Johannesburg Sun Hotel.
54=	Times Tower		140 m (459 ft)	38	2000	Kenya	Nairobi	Tallest building in Kenya from 2000 to 2016.
54=	Michelangelo Towers		140 m (459 ft)	34	2005	South Africa	Johannesburg	
54=	Trust Bank Building		140 m (459 ft)	31	1970	South Africa	Johannesburg	Tallest building in Africa from 1970 to 1973, along with Absa Tower. Formerly known as Umnotho House.
54=	Absa Tower		140 m (459 ft)	31	1970	South Africa	Johannesburg	Tallest building in Africa from 1970 to 1973, along with Trust Bank Building.
65	The St. Regis Cairo		139.5 m (458 ft)	32	2021	Egypt	Cairo	
66	Standard Bank Centre		139 m (456 ft)	34	1968	South Africa	Johannesburg	Tallest building in Africa from 1968 to 1970.
67	Southern Life Centre		138 m (453 ft)	30	1973	South Africa	Johannesburg	Also known as African Eagle Life Centre.
68	Old Mutual Centre		137 m (449 ft)	33	1995	South Africa	Durban	
69	Portside Tower		136.4 m (448 ft)	30	2014	South Africa	Cape Town	Tallest building in Cape Town.
70	Casablanca Finance City Tower		136 m (446 ft)	27	2019	Morocco	Casablanca	Tallest building in Casablanca. Tallest building in Morocco from 2019 to 2023.
71=	Tours Mpila 1		135.8 m (446 ft)	30	2019	Republic of the Congo	Brazzaville	Tallest building in Congo and Central Africa, along with Tours Mpila 2.
71=	Tours Mpila 2		135.8 m (446 ft)	30	2019	🇨🇬 Republic of the Congo	Brazzaville	Tallest building in Congo and Central Africa, along with Tours Mpila 1.
73=	National Bank of Egypt Northern Tower		135 m (443 ft)	33	1986	Egypt	Cairo	Tallest building in Egypt from 1986 to 1987, along with National Bank of Egypt Southern Tower.
73=	National Bank of Egypt Southern Tower		135 m (443 ft)	33	1986	Egypt	Cairo	Tallest building in Egypt from 1986 to 1987, along with National Bank of Egypt Northern Tower.
73=	San Stefano Grand Plaza		135 m (443 ft)	31	2006	Egypt	Alexandria	
76=	Hibir Tower		134 m (440 ft)	35	2021	Ethiopia	Addis Ababa	Also known as United Bank Headquarters.
76=	Eko Champagne Pearl Tower		134 m (440 ft)	30	2017	Nigeria	Lagos	
78	Prism Tower		133 m (436 ft)	34	2018	Kenya	Nairobi	
79	Monte Blanc		132.6 m (435 ft)	40	1985	South Africa	Durban	
80	ABSA Building		132 m (433 ft)	38	1976	South Africa	Pretoria	
81=	Al Hayat Tower		130 m (427 ft)	36	2011	Libya	Tripoli	Also known as JW Marriott Hotel Tripoli. Tallest hotel in Libya.
81=	Banco de Moçambique Tower 1		130 m (427 ft)	31	2016	Mozambique	Maputo	Tallest building in Mozambique.
81=	Bank Misr Building		130 m (427 ft)	29	1985	Egypt	Cairo	Tallest building in Egypt from 1985 to 1986.
81=	NTC Tower		130 m (427 ft)	29	2009	Sudan	Khartoum	Tallest building in Sudan. Severely damaged by fire in 2024 due to the ongoing Sudanese civil war.
81=	Pyramid Continental Hotel		130 m (427 ft)	27	2024	Zambia	Lusaka	Tallest building in Zambia.
86	209 Smit Street		128 m (420 ft)	30	1976	South Africa	Johannesburg	
87	1 Thibault Square		126.5 m (415 ft)	32	1972	South Africa	Cape Town	Formerly known as LG Building and BP Centre.
88	Le'Mac		126 m (413 ft)	30	2016	Kenya	Nairobi	
89=	Orange Telecommunication Tower		125 m (410 ft)	33	2013	Madagascar	Antananarivo	Tallest building in Madagascar.
89=	Bunge Tower		125 m (410 ft)	26	2024	Kenya	Nairobi	Formerly known as Parliament Tower.
91=	Bank of Mauritius Tower		124 m (407 ft)	25	2006	Mauritius	Port Louis	Tallest building in Mauritius.
91=	Union Bank Building		124 m (407 ft)	28	1991	Nigeria	Lagos	
93=	Kine Centre		123 m (404 ft)	27	1974	South Africa	Johannesburg	
93=	Ministry of Housing, Urban Planning and the City		123 m (404 ft)	24	2025	Algeria	Algiers	
95=	El Maadi Residential Tower 5		122 m (400 ft)	35	1987	Egypt	Cairo	
95=	El Maadi Residential Tower 6		122 m (400 ft)	35	1987	Egypt	Cairo	
95=	El Maadi Residential Tower 7		122 m (400 ft)	35	1987	Egypt	Cairo	
95=	El Maadi Residential Tower 8		122 m (400 ft)	35	1987	Egypt	Cairo	
95=	El Maadi Residential Tower 9		122 m (400 ft)	35	1987	Egypt	Cairo	
95=	El Maadi Residential Tower 10		122 m (400 ft)	35	1987	Egypt	Cairo	
95=	El Maadi Residential Tower 11		122 m (400 ft)	35	1987	Egypt	Cairo	
95=	El Maadi Residential Tower 12		122 m (400 ft)	35	1987	Egypt	Cairo	

== Timeline of tallest buildings ==
Name	Image	Country	City	Years As Tallest	Height m (ft)	Floors	Notes
Rissik Street Post Office		South Africa	Johannesburg	1897–1954	102 m (335 ft)	4	
Belmont Building		Egypt	Cairo	1954–1965	106 m (348 ft)	31	
Schlesinger Building		South Africa	Johannesburg	1965–1968	110 m (361 ft)	21	
Standard Bank Centre		South Africa	Johannesburg	1968–1970	139 m (456 ft)	34	
Trust Bank Building		South Africa	Johannesburg	1970–1973	140 m (459 ft)	31	
Absa Tower		South Africa	Johannesburg	1970–1973	140 m (459 ft)	31	
Marble Towers		South Africa	Johannesburg	1973–1973	152.1 m (499 ft)	32	First building in Africa to exceed 150 m (492 ft).
Carlton Centre		South Africa	Johannesburg	1973–2019	223 m (732 ft)	50	First building in Africa to exceed 200 m (656 ft).
The Leonardo		South Africa	Johannesburg	2019–2019	234 m (768 ft)	56	
Great Mosque of Algiers Tower		Algeria	Algiers	2019–2024	265 m (869 ft)	37	Tallest minaret in the world.
Iconic Tower		Egypt	The New Capital	2024–2026	393.8 m (1,292 ft)	77	First supertall skyscraper in Africa.
Tour F		Ivory Coast	Abidjan	2026–Present	421 m (1,381 ft)	76	

== Countries with the most skyscrapers ==
This list ranks African countries by the number of completed or topped out skyscrapers taller than 150 m (492 ft) as of 2026.

Rank	Country	Tallest Building	Height Of Tallest Building	150 m+ (492 ft+)	200 m+ (656 ft+)	300 m+ (984 ft+)
1	Egypt	Iconic Tower	393.8 m (1,292 ft)	21	6	1
2	South Africa	The Leonardo	234 m (768 ft)	6	2	0
3=	Kenya	Britam Tower	200.1 m (656 ft)	4	1	0
3=	Tanzania	PPF Headquarters	160 m (525 ft)	4	0	0
5	Ethiopia	Commercial Bank of Ethiopia Headquarters	209.3 m (687 ft)	2	1	0
6=	Ivory Coast	Tour F	421 m (1,381 ft)	1	1	1
6=	Algeria	Great Mosque of Algiers Tower	265 m (869 ft)	1	1	0
6=	Morocco	Mohammed VI Tower	250 m (820 ft)	1	1	0
6=	Nigeria	NECOM House	160.3 m (526 ft)	1	0	0
6=	Uganda	NSSF Pension Towers	155 m (509 ft)	1	0	0

== Under construction ==
This list ranks buildings currently under construction in Africa that will stand at least 400 ft (122 m) tall. As of 2026, there are over 20 skyscrapers exceeding 150 m (492 ft) under construction across the continent, including 3 supertall skyscrapers.

Name	Height m (ft)	Floors	Expected Completion	Country	City	Notes
Ethiopian Electric Power Headquarters	346 m (1,135 ft)	66	2027	Ethiopia	Addis Ababa	Construction began in January 2024 but was halted later that year due to financial constraints. The project officially resumed in June 2025 following a successful revival of the tender process.
Ethiopian Electric Utility Headquarters	328 m (1,076 ft)	63	2028	Ethiopia	Addis Ababa	
Dzair Media City Main Tower	310 m (1,017 ft)	—	2027	Algeria	Algiers	
ENTV Tower	280 m (919 ft)	—	2027	🇩🇿 Algeria	Algiers	
Bank of Abyssinia Headquarters	270 m (886 ft)	60	2027	Ethiopia	Addis Ababa	
Capital Diamond Tower	260 m (853 ft)	66	2029	Egypt	The New Capital	Upon completion, it will become the tallest twisted building in Africa.
NSSF Twin Tower A	260 m (853 ft)	60	2028	Kenya	Nairobi	Upon completion, it will become the tallest building in Kenya. Designed by China Academy of Building Research (CABR).
FirstBank Head Office Building	252 m (827 ft)	43	2029	Nigeria	Lagos	Upon completion, it will become the tallest building in Nigeria. Designed by MZ Architects.
Infinity Tower	250 m (820 ft)	50	2028	Egypt	The New Capital	
Forbes International Tower	240 m (787 ft)	55	2030	Egypt	The New Capital	Designed by Adrian Smith + Gordon Gill Architecture. Will become the world's first hydrogen-powered skyscraper.
Nile Business City Northeast Tower	233 m (764 ft)	56	2028	Egypt	The New Capital	
Nile Business City Northwest Tower	233 m (764 ft)	56	2028	Egypt	The New Capital	
Nile Business City West Tower	233 m (764 ft)	56	2028	Egypt	The New Capital	
Tycoon Tower	233 m (764 ft)	56	2028	Egypt	The New Capital	Upon completion, it will become the tallest hotel in Africa. Also known as the Nile Business City East Tower.
Tour de la Nation	225 m (738 ft)	46	2029	Ivory Coast	Abidjan	
Raville Tower & Residences	206 m (676 ft)	46	2027	Egypt	New Cairo	
Libreville Tower	204 m (669 ft)	52	2027	Gabon	Libreville	Upon completion, it will become the first skyscraper in Gabon and the tallest building in Central Africa. Designed by FB Group.
East Tower	185 m (607 ft)	47	2027	Egypt	The New Capital	
6ixty Iconic Tower	180 m (591 ft)	45	2027	Egypt	The New Capital	
Oromia Insurance Company Headquarters	180 m (591 ft)	44	2028	Ethiopia	Addis Ababa	
Marina Alamein Tower 4	175.7 m (576 ft)	45	2026	Egypt	New Alamein	
Marina Alamein Tower 5	175.7 m (576 ft)	45	2026	Egypt	New Alamein	
Taj Tower	170 m (558 ft)	43	2027	Egypt	The New Capital	
Marina Alamein Tower 2	167.7 m (550 ft)	42	2026	Egypt	New Alamein	
Marina Alamein Tower 3	167.7 m (550 ft)	42	2026	Egypt	New Alamein	
Ethiopian Commodity Exchange Headquarters	155 m (509 ft)	36	2029	Ethiopia	Addis Ababa	
Levels Business Tower	153 m (502 ft)	36	2027	Egypt	The New Capital	
205 Tower 1	150 m (492 ft)	40	2029	Egypt	Sheikh Zayed City	
205 Tower 2	150 m (492 ft)	40	2029	Egypt	Sheikh Zayed City	
205 Tower 3	150 m (492 ft)	40	2029	Egypt	Sheikh Zayed City	
Kigali Green Complex	150 m (492 ft)	29	2027	Rwanda	Kigali	Will become the first skyscraper in Rwanda upon completion.
NSSF Twin Tower B	145 m (476 ft)	35	2028	Kenya	Nairobi	
Marina Alamein Tower 1	144.6 m (474 ft)	36	2026	Egypt	New Alamein	
One on Bree	131 m (430 ft)	41	2028	South Africa	Cape Town	
31 North Tower	131 m (430 ft)	36	2025	Egypt	The New Capital	
M Tower	131 m (430 ft)	31	2027	Morocco	Casablanca	
Shift Tower	130 m (427 ft)	35	2026	Morocco	Casablanca	
Daktower	122 m (400 ft)	32	2027	Senegal	Dakar	Upon completion, it will become the tallest building and the first skyscraper in Senegal.

== Approved, proposed or on hold ==
This list ranks buildings in Africa that are either approved, proposed, or on hold and are planned to reach a height of at least 400 ft (122 m).

Building approved
Building proposed
Building stopped construction

Name	Height m (ft)	Floors	Expected Completion	Country	City	Status	References
Oblisco Capitale	1,000 m (3,281 ft)	250	2030	Egypt	The New Capital	Approved	
Blue Up and Down Tourist Tower	550 m (1,804 ft)	—	—	Egypt	New Alamein	Proposed	
Father and Son Skyscraper	470 m (1,542 ft)	100+	—	Egypt	Cairo	Proposed	
Meles Zenawi International Centre	448 m (1,470 ft)	99	—	Ethiopia	Addis Ababa	Proposed	
Centurion Symbio-City Tower 1	447 m (1,467 ft)	110	—	South Africa	Centurion	Proposed	
Carthage Gate Complex	392.6 m (1,288 ft)	99	—	Tunisia	Tunis	Proposed	
Nut Administrative Tower	380 m (1,247 ft)	80	—	Egypt	The New Capital	Proposed	
Blue Up and Down Residential Tower	380 m (1,247 ft)	—	—	Egypt	New Alamein	Proposed	
Nigeria Elevation Tower	377 m (1,237 ft)	75	—	Nigeria	Lagos	Proposed	
Palm Exotica	370 m (1,214 ft)	61	—	Kenya	Watamu	On Hold	
Centurion Symbio-City Tower 2	336 m (1,102 ft)	80	—	South Africa	Centurion	Proposed	
Pinnacle Tower 1	320 m (1,050 ft)	70	—	Kenya	Nairobi	On Hold	
Africa Square and Tower	308 m (1,010 ft)	70	—	Nigeria	Abuja	Proposed	
Jirian City Tower 1	300+ m (984+ ft)	80	2029	Egypt	Jirian City	Approved	
Jirian City Tower 2	300+ m (984+ ft)	80	2029	Egypt	Jirian City	Approved	
Jirian City Tower 3	300+ m (984+ ft)	80	2029	Egypt	Jirian City	Approved	
Jirian City Tower 4	300+ m (984+ ft)	80	2029	Egypt	Jirian City	Approved	
Jirian City Tower 5	300+ m (984+ ft)	80	2029	Egypt	Jirian City	Approved	
Jirian City Tower 6	300+ m (984+ ft)	80	2029	Egypt	Jirian City	Approved	
Zanzibar Domino Commercial Tower	300 m (984 ft)	78	—	Tanzania	Zanzibar City	Proposed	
Al Djazair Tower 1	300 m (984 ft)	62	—	Algeria	Oran	On Hold	
Nile Tower	300 m (984 ft)	70	—	Egypt	Cairo	Proposed	
Lady Marina	300 m (984 ft)	65	—	Nigeria	Lagos	Proposed	
The Twins Tunis 1	297 m (974 ft)	64	—	Tunisia	Tunis	Proposed	
The Twins Tunis 2	297 m (974 ft)	64	—	Tunisia	Tunis	Proposed	
Upperhill Square	290 m (951 ft)	66	—	Kenya	Nairobi	Proposed	
The Tower of Life	290 m (951 ft)	40	—	Senegal	Dakar	Proposed	
One Liberty Tower	280 m (919 ft)	65	—	South Africa	Johannesburg	Proposed	
Chuan Hui International Hotel	264 m (866 ft)	58	—	Ethiopia	Addis Ababa	Proposed	
Blue Up and Down Business Tower	260 m (853 ft)	—	—	Egypt	New Alamein	Proposed	
Mesob Tower	250 m (820 ft)	70	—	Ethiopia	Addis Ababa	On Hold	
Al Djazair Tower 2	250 m (820 ft)	50	—	Algeria	Oran	On Hold	
Camtel Headquarters	250 m (820 ft)	48	—	Cameroon	Yaounde	Proposed	
Djibouti Tower 1	243 m (797 ft)	43	—	Djibouti	Djibouti City	On Hold	
Djibouti Tower 2	243 m (797 ft)	43	—	Djibouti	Djibouti City	On Hold	
Taj Tower 2	230 m (755 ft)	56	2030	Egypt	The New Capital	Approved	
Kampala Tower	222 m (728 ft)	60	—	Uganda	Kampala	Proposed	
Eco Tower Cairo	220 m (722 ft)	70	—	Egypt	Cairo	Proposed	
Diamond Tower	220 m (722 ft)	54	—	Uganda	Kampala	Proposed	
Quara Manufacturing PLC Tower	219 m (719 ft)	44	—	Ethiopia	Addis Ababa	On Hold	
Berhan Bank	212 m (696 ft)	47	2028	Ethiopia	Addis Ababa	On Hold	
Centurion Symbio-City Tower 3	210 m (689 ft)	60	—	South Africa	Centurion	Proposed	
Pinnacle Tower 2	201 m (659 ft)	45	—	Kenya	Nairobi	On Hold	
Angola Hotel Complex	200 m (656 ft)	58	—	Angola	Luanda	Proposed	
Siinqee Bank Headquarters	200 m (656 ft)	50	—	Ethiopia	Addis Ababa	Proposed	
Zayed Crystal Spark	200 m (656 ft)	49	—	Egypt	6th of October	Proposed	
Debub Global Bank New Headquarters	200 m (656 ft)	45	—	Ethiopia	Addis Ababa	Proposed	
Seaspark Twin Tower 1	200 m (656 ft)	45	—	Egypt	New Alamein	Proposed	
Seaspark Twin Tower 2	200 m (656 ft)	45	—	Egypt	New Alamein	Proposed	
Oculus Grande	178 m (584 ft)	35	—	Nigeria	Lagos	Proposed	
Dakar Tower Residential	174 m (571 ft)	39	—	Senegal	Dakar	Proposed	
Grand Nile Tower Expansion	167 m (548 ft)	12	—	Egypt	Cairo	Proposed	
Dar es Salaam City Center Promise Tower	165 m (541 ft)	35	—	Tanzania	Dar es Salaam	Proposed	
Eko White Pearl Tower	165 m (541 ft)	31	—	Nigeria	Lagos	Proposed	
Medina Tower	160 m (525 ft)	40	—	Libya	Tripoli	On Hold	
Montave	160 m (525 ft)	40	—	Kenya	Nairobi	On Hold	
World Trade Center Hotel Tower	158 m (518 ft)	37	—	Nigeria	Abuja	Proposed	
Atlantic Tower	150 m (492 ft)	37	—	Morocco	Casablanca	On Hold	
17 Bree Street	125.8 m (413 ft)	40	—	South Africa	Cape Town	Proposed	

== Unbuilt ==
This list ranks buildings in Africa that were proposed but later cancelled, scrapped, or rejected, all of which were planned to reach a height of at least 400 ft (122 m).

Name	Height m (ft)	Floors	Cancelled	Projected Completion	Country	City	References
Mediterranean Gate Main Tower	1,000+ m (3,281+ ft)	200+	2009	2030	Tunisia	Tunis	
Al Noor Tower	540 m (1,772 ft)	114	2018	2018	Morocco	Casablanca	
Durban Iconic Tower	370 m (1,214 ft)	88	2018	2021	South Africa	Durban	
Akon Tower	300.2 m (985 ft)	68	2025	2028	Senegal	Akon City	
G47 Ugatuzi Tower (Original Proposal)	288 m (945 ft)	66	2025	2023	Kenya	Nairobi	
Hope City	270 m (886 ft)	75	—	2016	Ghana	Accra	
Menelik Square	220 m (722 ft)	60	—	2009	Ethiopia	Addis Ababa	
Shaza Cairo Nile	200 m (656 ft)	50	—	2018	Egypt	Cairo	
Abuja International Tower & Hotel	196 m (643 ft)	55	—	2008	Nigeria	Abuja	
Cairo Plaza Tower 1	191 m (627 ft)	43	—	—	Egypt	Cairo	
Cairo Plaza Tower 2	191 m (627 ft)	43	—	—	Egypt	Cairo	
Maputo Business Tower	190 m (623 ft)	47	—	2014	Mozambique	Maputo	
Hazina Trade Centre (Original Proposal)	180 m (591 ft)	39	2017	2016	Kenya	Nairobi	
Al-Mogran Main Tower	175 m (574 ft)	35	—	2008	Sudan	Khartoum	
Maputo Towers 1	170 m (558 ft)	44	—		Mozambique	Maputo	
Maputo Towers 2	170 m (558 ft)	44	—		Mozambique	Maputo	
JW Marriott Casablanca	167.1 m (548 ft)	42	—	2017	Morocco	Casablanca	
La Tour Casa Nearshore	160 m (525 ft)	44	—	2014	Morocco	Casablanca	
Accra Twin Towers - Tower A	160 m (525 ft)	40	—	—	Ghana	Accra	
Accra Twin Towers - Tower B	160 m (525 ft)	40	—	—	Ghana	Accra	
World Trade Centre Angola	155 m (509 ft)	42	—	2009	Angola	Luanda	
The Mast	153 m (502 ft)	40	—	2008	South Africa	Durban	
Cytonn Towers	150 m (492 ft)	35	2018	2022	Kenya	Nairobi	
Zero-2-One	142.2 m (467 ft)	44	—	2023	South Africa	Cape Town	
ABC Building	141.1 m (463 ft)	33	1976	1976	Zimbabwe	Zvishavane	
Polana Twin Tower 1	140 m (459 ft)	34	—	—	Mozambique	Maputo	
Polana Twin Tower 2	140 m (459 ft)	34	—	—	Mozambique	Maputo	
San Raphael	134.1 m (440 ft)	35	—	2007	South Africa	Durban	
The Vogue	128 m (420 ft)	39	—	2023	South Africa	Cape Town	

== See also ==
- List of tallest buildings in Algeria
- List of tallest buildings in Egypt
- List of tallest buildings in Kenya
- List of tallest buildings in Morocco
- List of tallest buildings in Nigeria
- List of tallest buildings in Tanzania
- List of tallest buildings in Zimbabwe
- List of tallest buildings in South Africa
- List of tallest buildings in Abidjan
- List of tallest buildings in Cairo
- List of tallest buildings in Cape Town
- List of tallest buildings in Kampala
- List of tallest buildings in Luanda
