= Banco de Moçambique Tower 1 =

Office building in Maputo

- Banco de Moçambique Tower 1 in May 2024

- Location within Mozambique

General information
- Status: Completed
- Type: Office
- Architectural style: Modern
- Location: Samora Machel & Ave de 25 Setembro, Maputo, Mozambique
- Coordinates: 25°58′21″S 32°34′12″E
- Completed: 2016

Height
- Roof: 130 m (427 ft)

Technical details
- Floor count: 31

Design and construction
- Architect: Henrique Castro Amaro

Banco de Moçambique Tower 1 is a 130 m (427 ft) tall skyscraper located on Samora Machel & Ave de 25 Setembro in Maputo. It was built in 2016 and has 31 floors. The building is currently the tallest building in Mozambique; it is also tied with 4 other buildings as the 81st-tallest building in Africa.

The building is the current headquarters for the Bank of Mozambique as of January 2026.

The building's entrance in 2018.

== See also ==
- Bank of Mozambique
- List of tallest buildings in Africa
- List of tallest buildings by country
- Mozambique
- The Leonardo
- Commercial Bank of Ethiopia Headquarters
- NECOM House
- UAP Old Mutual Tower
