= Ethiopian Electric Power Headquarters =

Office building in Addis Ababa, Ethiopia

- Interactive map of the Ethiopian Electric Power Headquarters area

General information
- Status: Under construction
- Type: Office
- Location: Kirkos, Addis Ababa, Ethiopia
- Coordinates: 09°0′34.6″N 38°44′43.7″E
- Groundbreaking: January 2024
- Opening: 2027
- Cost: ETB25 billion (USD$445 million)

Height
- Roof: 346 m (1,135 ft)

Technical details
- Floor count: 66
- Grounds: 20,792 square metres (5.138 acres)

Design and construction
- Architect: Dar Al-Handasah
- Developer: Ethiopian Electric Power

Ethiopian Electric Power Headquarters is a 62-storey office building under construction in the Kirkos district of Addis Ababa, the capital and largest city of Ethiopia. The building is located right on Mexico Square, and once completed, it is expected to become the tallest building both in East Africa and sub-Saharan Africa more broadly, as well as the second tallest in Africa.

== Location ==
The building is located on a 20,792 square metres (5.138 acres) plot of land off the southern end of the Mexico Square roundabout. The site was specifically chosen so as to be close to the newly developed central business district that sits North-West of the plot.

== Construction & funding ==
The construction is expected to cost nearly ETB25 billion (approx. US$445 million), meaning if built, the project would surpass the Commercial Bank of Ethiopia Headquarters as the most expensive building project in Ethiopia (the CBE HQ cost roughly ETB5.3 billion(US$303 million), although not adjusted for inflation).

Preminiery topography surveys have already been conducted and excavation work for soil testing is almost complete, with all 28 designated wells having been dug. According to project manager Behailu Tadele, the building's design will meet the gold standard of the Energy and Environmental Design (LEED) system as governed by the U.S. Green Building Council.

== Design ==
The building is 327.5 metres tall with 62 stories. Sitting on a 20,792 square meter plot of land, the building will have 197,800 square meters of floor area.

Upon completion, it will be the tallest building in Ethiopia and East Africa, as well as the second tallest building in Africa, only being surpassed by the Iconic Tower in Egypt's New Administrative Capital.

== See also ==
- List of tallest buildings in Africa
