= List of tallest buildings in Luanda =

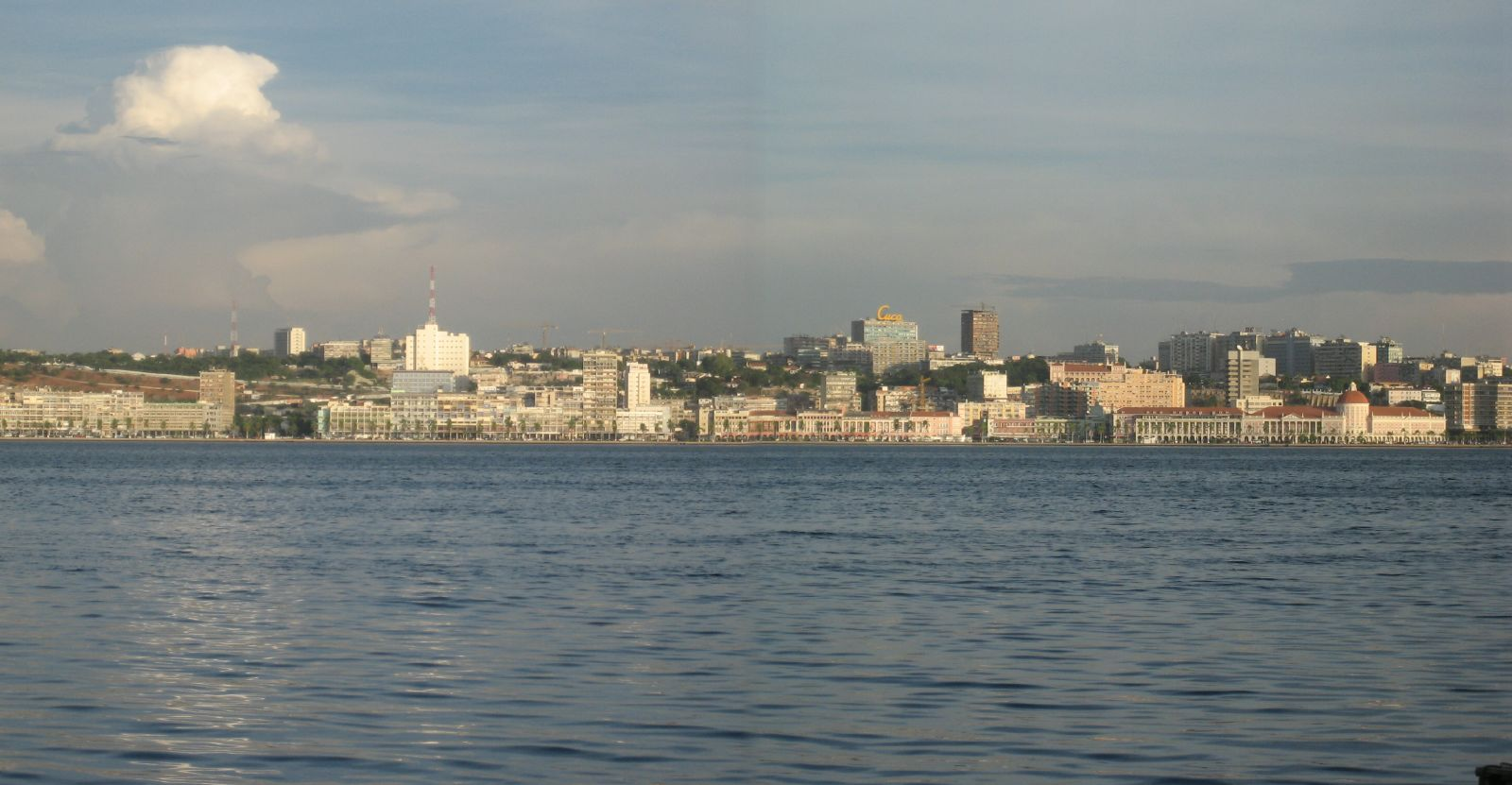
Luanda skyline from the Atlantic Ocean.

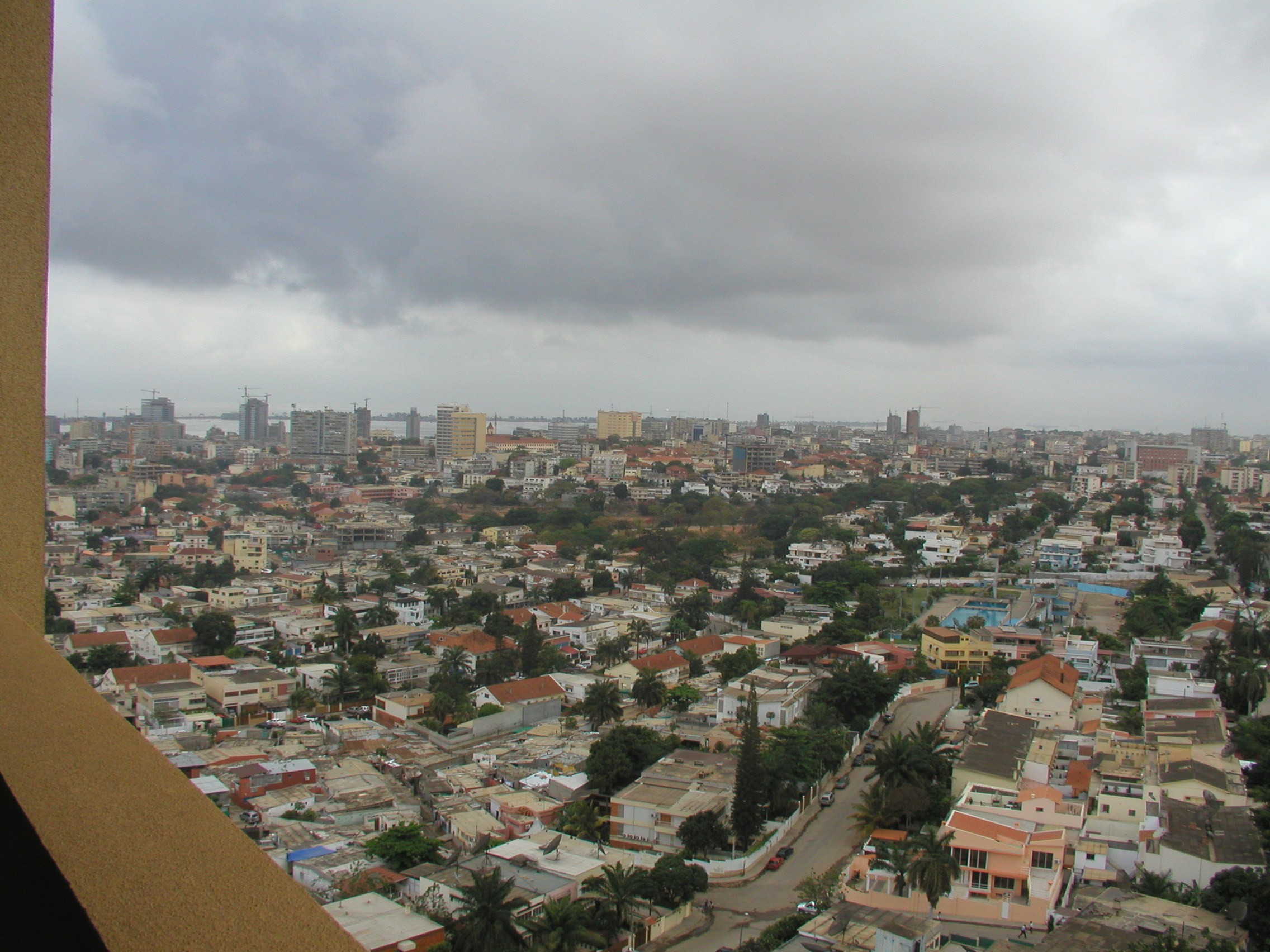
A multitude of cranes on the Luanda Skyline.

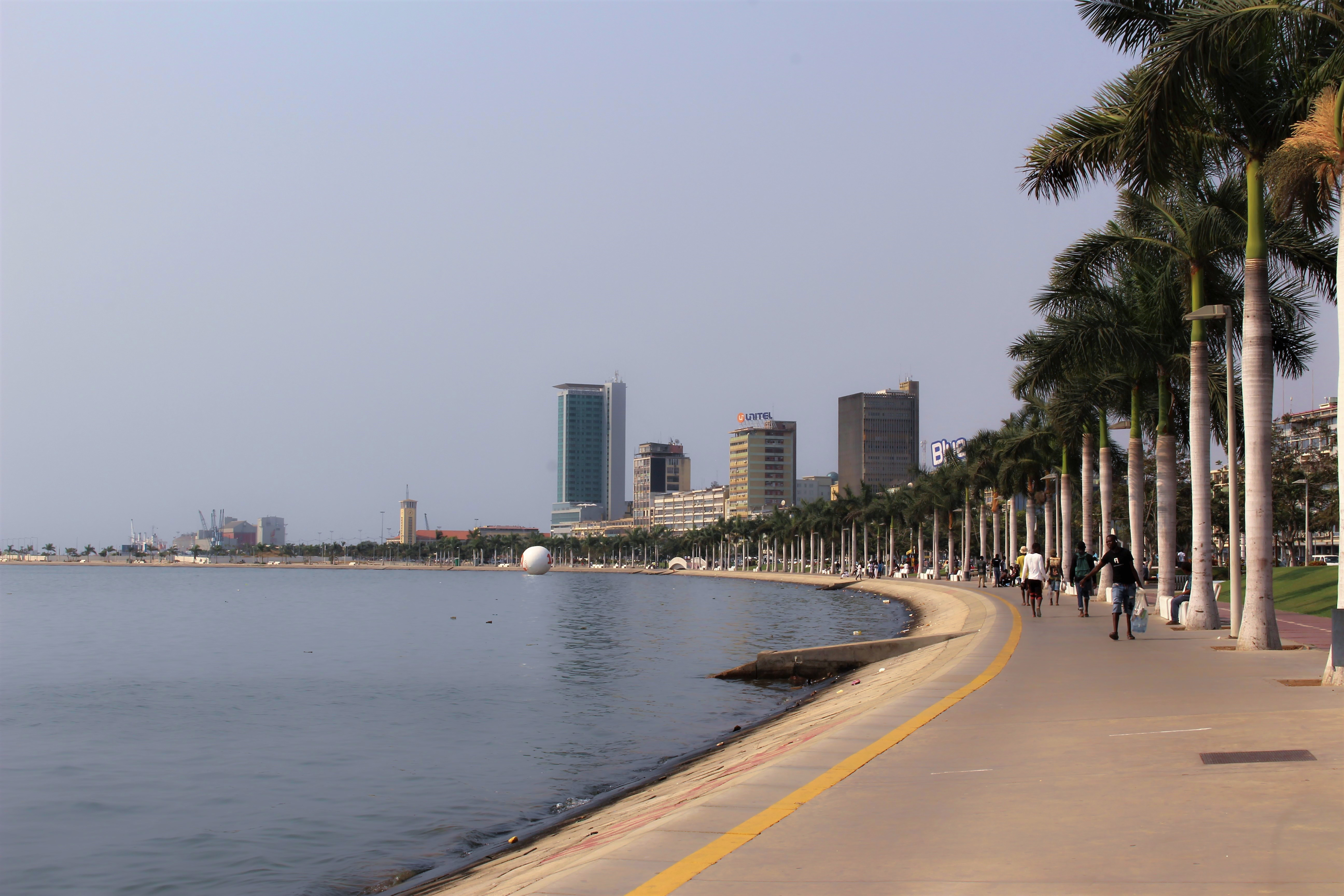
Luanda Bay buildings.

Luanda is the capital and largest city in Angola. Due to decades of civil war, Angola lacked significant development until very recently. Currently, there are 12 buildings that stand taller than 35 m (115 ft). The tallest building in the city is the 25-storey, 104 m (341 ft) Intercontinental Hotel & Casino completed in 2011. The second-tallest building in the city is Edificio GES, standing at 100 m (328 ft) tall with 25 storeys. Several of the tallest buildings in the Angola are currently under construction in the city. If completed, Torre De Angola at 325 m (1,066 ft) will be the tallest building in Africa and in the top 100 tallest in the world. Additionally, upon completion, the Angola World Trade Center twin towers will be the tallest twin buildings in Africa at 155 m (509 ft) and 135 m (443 ft) tall.

Luanda's history is one that involves a lot of destruction and strife. However, due to the end of the civil war in 2002, Luanda is undergoing massive reconstruction and economic development. Angola is becoming one of the most advanced countries in Africa with the highest concentration of development currently on the African Continent. All of the city's high rises have been constructed within the last six years, a product of investment in the nation's vast oil reserves.

As of 2011, Luanda had 12 completed high-rise buildings, with four towers over 100 m (328 ft) tall under construction, four approved for construction and dozens more high rises proposed. After this skyscraper boom, Luanda's skyline will have dramatically changed.

== Tallest buildings ==
This list ranks Luanda's skyscrapers that stand at least 50 m (164 ft) tall, based on standard height measurement. This includes spires and architectural details but does not include antenna masts.

Was the tallest building in Luanda upon completion

Buildings completed as of May 2019
Building	Height	Floors	Completed
Imob Business Tower (Mixed use)	145 m (476 ft)	35	2018
Edificio Kilamba (Office)	107 m (351 ft)	27	2017
Edificio Eskom (Office)	102 m (335 ft)	25	2008
CFI Tower (Mixed use)	100 m (330 ft)	29	2003
CFI Tower 2 (Office)	109 m (358 ft)	30	2015
Loanda Tower 2 (Office)	102 m (335 ft)	28	2014
Torre Ambiente (Office)	102 m (335 ft)	28	2011
Torre Kianda 4 (Mixed use)	98 m (322 ft)	27	2018
Torre Kianda 3 (Office)	98 m (322 ft)	27	2018
Ocean Towers -Towers A (Mixed use)	98 m (322 ft)	27	2013
Sky Tower Residential A (Mixed use)	98 m (322 ft)	27	2013
Sky Tower Residential B (Mixed use)	98 m (322 ft)	27	2012
Torre Kinaxixi 1 (Office)	98 m (322 ft)	27	2018
Torre Kinaxixi 2 (Office)	98 m (322 ft)	27	2018
Torre Victoria (Hotel)	98 m (322 ft)	27	2018
Loanda tower 1 (Office)	95 m (312 ft)	26	2014
Ocean Tower B (Residential)	95 m (312 ft)	26	2013
Torre do 1º Congresso (Office)	95 m (312 ft)	26	2013
Hotel Presidente (Hotel)	95 m (312 ft)	26	2013
Torres AAA (Hotel)	95 m (312 ft)	26	2017
Torre kianda 2 (Office)	91 m (299 ft)	25	2018
Torre kianda 1 (Office)	91 m (299 ft)	25	2018
Intercontinental Hotel & Casino (Hotel)	104 m (341 ft)	25	2011
Edificio GES (Mixed use)	100 m (330 ft)	25	2007
Edificio Sonangol (Office)	96 m (315 ft)	23	2007
Empório Luanda Plaza Hotel (Hotel)	90 m (300 ft)	23	2010
Le Meridien Presidente Luanda Hotel (Hotel)	85 m (279 ft)	26	1971
Torres Atlantico Office Tower (Office)	80 m (260 ft)	19	2007
Edificio BPC (Office)	72 m (236 ft)	18	–
Edificio Zimbo Tower (Residential)	70 m (230 ft)	21	2010
Edificio de Beers (Office)	60 m (200 ft)	13	–
Torres Atlantico Condominium Tower (Residential)	50 m (160 ft)	16	2007
Hotel Tropico (Hotel)	50 m (160 ft)	13	–

== Projects ==
=== Under construction, approved ===
Name	Height m / ft	Floors	Year	Status	Notes
Torre De Angola	325 m (1,066 ft)	70	2015	Approved	
World Trade Center Angola – Tower 1	155 m (509 ft)	42	2012	Under Construction	
World Trade Center Angola – Tower 2	135 m (443 ft)	37	2012	Under Construction	
Tórre C I F	115 m (377 ft)	25	2014	Under Construction	
Euro Africa Tower	110 m (360 ft)	23	2013	Approved	
Major Kanhangulo Street Building	110 m (360 ft)	24	2013	Under Construction	
Edifício Rocha Monteiro	105 m (344 ft)	24	2013	Approved	
Baia Building	100 m (330 ft)	22	2013	Approved	

== See also ==
- List of tallest buildings in Africa
- List of tallest buildings in South Africa
- List of tallest buildings in Zimbabwe
- List of tallest buildings and structures in South Africa
- List of tallest buildings in Canada
