= Pension Towers =

- Location within Kampala Pension Towers (Uganda) Pension Towers (Africa)

General information
- Status: Completed
- Type: Commercial
- Location: Lumumba Avenue, Kampala, Uganda
- Coordinates: 00°19′15″N 32°34′38″E
- Construction started: April 2008
- Completed: August 2025

Height
- Roof: 155 m (509 ft)

Technical details
- Floor count: 32
- Floor area: 75,000 m^{2} (807,293 sq ft)

Design and construction
- Architects: Ssentoogo and Partners
- Main contractor: China Railway Construction Engineering Group

The Pension Towers, also known as the NSSF Pension Towers, is a skyscraper in Kampala, Uganda. Standing at a height of 155 m (509 ft) and encompassing 32 floors, it is currently the tallest building in Uganda. Construction on the project began in 2008 and was completed in 2025.

== Location ==
The skyscraper is located on Lumumba Avenue on Nakasero Hill, an upscale neighborhood in Kampala, the capital and largest city in Uganda.

== Overview ==
Construction of the office complex began in 2008 and consists of three interconnected towers. The design features a central 32-story tower flanked on either side by a 10-story tower. Upon final completion, the three structures will provide approximately 75,000 square meters (807,293 square feet) of commercial office space alongside parking facilities designed to accommodate over 500 vehicles.

As of December 2021, the skyscraper was approximately 70 percent complete and was valued at about USh 300 billion (approximately US$ 85 million). It was the largest single real estate investment in the country by both size and value at that time.

== History ==
The National Social Security Fund, also known as the NSSF, currently maintains its headquarters in Workers House on Pilkington Avenue. To address the shortage of upscale commercial rental space in the city, the NSSF began the construction of a new headquarters complex in 2008. The initial design called for a central tower of 25 floors, flanked by matching 8-story towers on each side of the building. In 2011, the design was updated to increase the height of the side towers to 10 stories each and modify the overall architecture.

ROKO Construction Company, which is a Ugandan engineering and construction firm, completed the four basement levels of the project between 2008 and 2012 but did not qualify for subsequent phases of the development. Following this, three Chinese firms participated in the final bidding process to secure the contract for the remaining construction works.

In August 2018, the Chairman of the National Social Security Fund, Patrick Byabakama Kaberenge, announced that the contract for the second phase of the skyscraper had been awarded to China Railway Construction Engineering Group Company Limited. The design was modified to increase the height of the central tower to 32 floors. Work on this second phase was initially scheduled to commence before the end of 2018, with an estimated duration of approximately three years.

In February 2019, Ugandan print media reported that construction was scheduled to resume in March 2019, with project completion expected no later than May 2022. Under the terms of the agreement, the main contractor would utilize its own funds to complete the skyscraper, with the National Social Security Fund providing payment upon the project closing in 2022.

== Construction costs ==
The first phase of the civil works, which was performed by ROKO Construction Company, cost USh 42.5 billion. In August 2012, China Civil Engineering Construction Corporation was awarded the contract to complete the second phase of the project at a price of USh 222.3 billion. This brought the total construction price to USh 264.8 billion. During the 2018 annual general meeting, the National Social Security Fund chairman announced that the construction of the second phase would cost US$ 110 million.

== Controversy ==
In August 2012, reports showed that the contractor selection did not follow Ugandan procurement rules. The winning bid cost USh 20 billion more than the lowest offer. The Inspector General of Government cancelled the award and a manager at the National Social Security Fund was fired. The Inspector General of Government also recommended repeating the entire process through an outside firm. Officials from the National Social Security Fund, the Inspector General of Government, and the Public Procurement and Disposal of Public Assets Authority continue to discuss how to proceed.

== Recent developments ==
In September 2018, officials from the National Social Security Fund announced that construction of the skyscraper would resume later that year following a seven-year delay. A new contractor, China Railway Construction Engineering Group Company Limited, was selected at a revised cost of US$ 110 million (approximately USh 410 billion).

== See also ==
- List of tallest buildings in Kampala
- List of tallest buildings in Africa

== Photos and diagrams ==
- Artist's Impression At Urbanlife.org
