= ABC Building =

General information
- Status: Never completed (vision)
- Type: Commercial Office
- Location: Zvishavane, Zimbabwe
- Construction started: 1976
- Completed: 1999
- Opening: 2002
- Owner: African Banking Corporation

Height
- Roof: 141.1 metres (463 ft)

Technical details
- Floor count: 33

Design and construction
- Architect: John Graham & Company

African Banking Corporation Building (simply ABC Building) is an unbuilt 141.1 metres (463 ft) skyscraper in Zvishavane, Zimbabwe. It was planned to be finished in 1976. If completed, it would have been the tallest structure in Zimbabwe.

== See also ==
- List of tallest buildings in Zimbabwe
