= Union Bank Building (Lagos) =

Skyscraper in Lagos

- Interactive map of the Union Bank Building area

General information
- Status: Completed
- Type: Commercial
- Location: 36 Marina, Lagos Island, Lagos, Lagos State, Nigeria
- Coordinates: 6.452379404026037°N 3.3879225150912426°E

Height
- Roof: 124 m (407 ft)

Technical details
- Floor count: 28

Design and construction
- Architect: Modulor Group
- Main contractor: CCMC International

Union Bank Building is a skyscraper in Lagos. The 28-storey building serves as the headquarters of the Union Bank of Nigeria.

== See also ==
- Skyscraper design and construction
- List of tallest buildings in Africa
