= Pearl Dawn =

Skyscraper in Umhlanga, KwaZulu-Natal

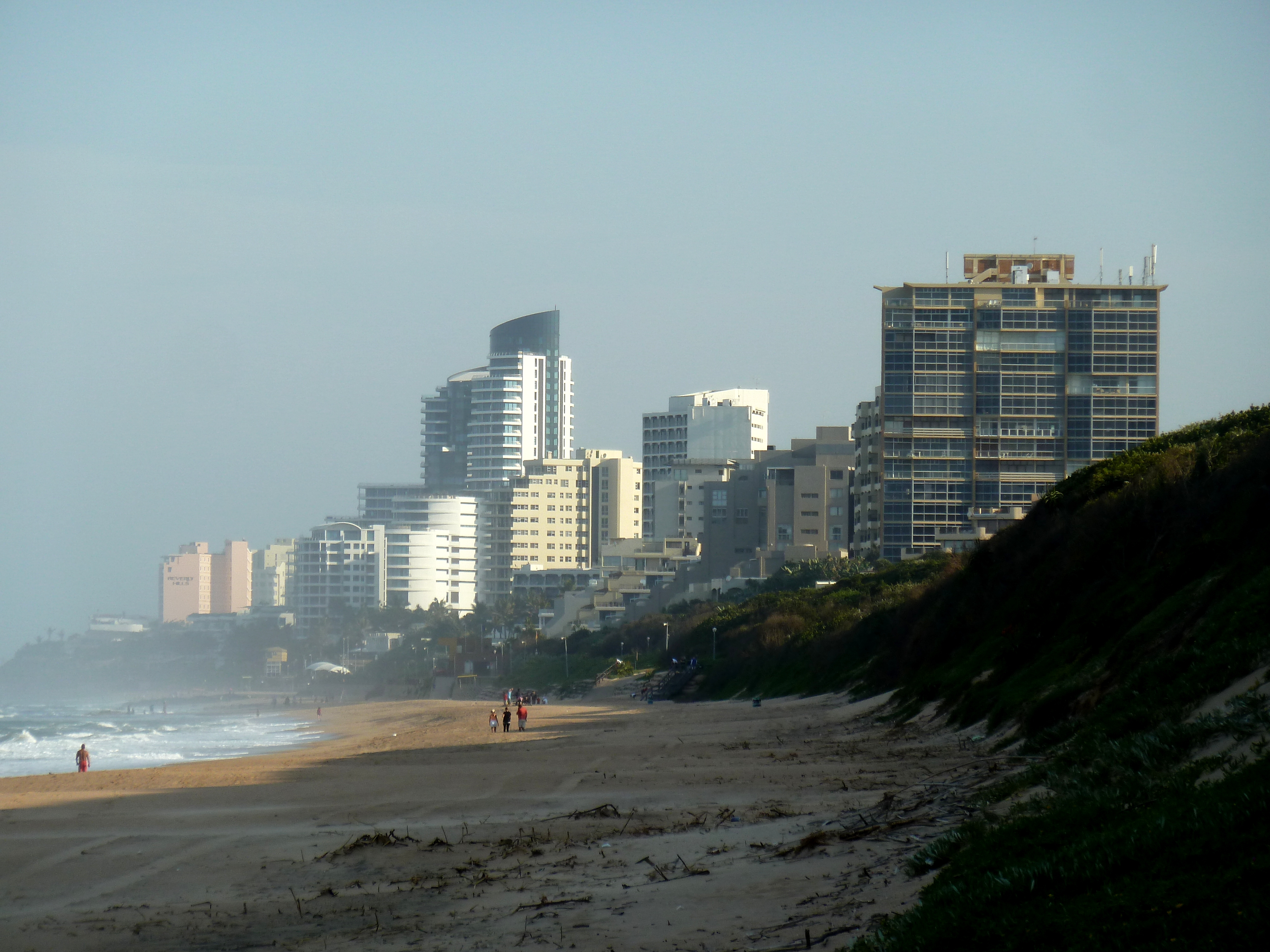

General information
- Status: Completed
- Type: Residential
- Location: uMhlanga, KwaZulu-Natal
- Construction started: 2006
- Completed: 2010

Height
- Roof: 499 ft (152 m)

Technical details
- Floor count: 31

Design and construction
- Architects: Seedat & Seedat

Pearl Dawn is a skyscraper in uMhlanga, KwaZulu-Natal. The 31st story was completed in 2008. It is designed in a futurist style. It is the 5th tallest building in South Africa.

== See also ==
- Skyscraper design and construction
- List of tallest buildings in Africa
