= Durban Iconic Tower =

Proposed super-tall skyscraper in Durban, South Africa

General information
- Status: Never built
- Type: Multi use, Office, Retail, Residential, Hotel
- Location: Durban, KwaZulu-Natal, South Africa
- Construction started: Uncertain
- Cost: R6bn

Height
- Roof: 370 metres (1,200 ft)

Technical details
- Floor count: 88

Design and construction
- Architect: Metropole
- Developer: Durban Tower Development Company

Durban Iconic Tower, was a proposed multi-billion Rand skyscraper in Durban, KwaZulu-Natal, South Africa.

At 370 metres (1,210 ft), if built it would have been the second-tallest building in Africa, after the 394 m Iconic Tower, as well as the second-tallest in the Southern Hemisphere, after the 382,9 m Autograph Tower. It would have replaced The Leonardo (234 m) as the tallest building in South Africa, which would have been the first time since the country's unification that its tallest building would have been located outside of the Johannesburg region. It would have also been the tallest structure in South Africa, exceeding the height of the Sasol CTL chimney in Secunda, which is 301 m. It would have been the 73rd tallest building in the world.

The building was proposed in 2016, and construction was planned to start in 2018 pending approval, but the tendering process has since been rejected by the Bid Adjudication Committee and thus the project is canceled .
