= NTC Tower =

Skyscraper in Khartoum, Sudan

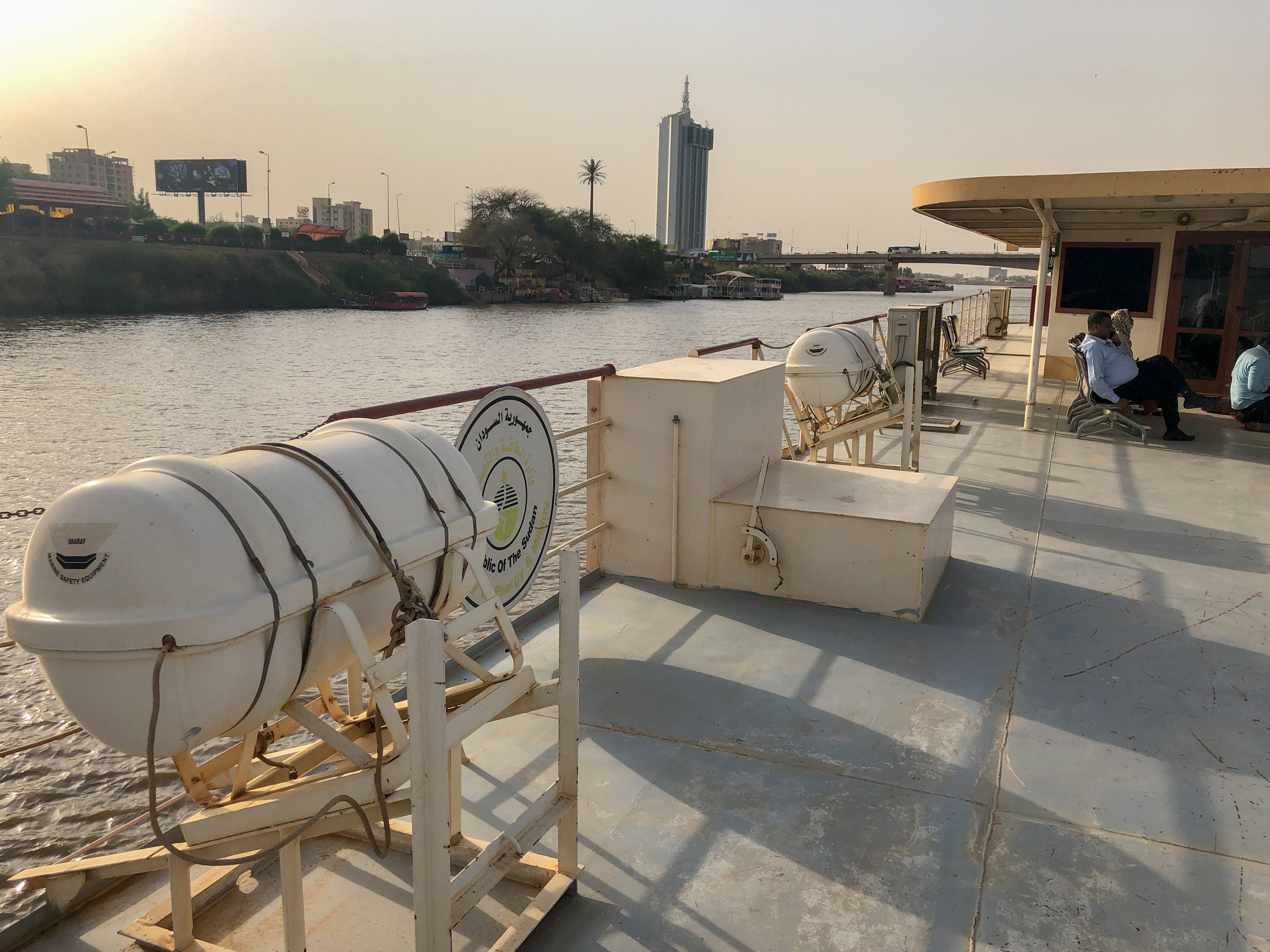
- NTC Tower, seen on the skyline

General information
- Status: Completed
- Type: Commercial
- Location: Khartoum, Sudan
- Opening: 2009

Height
- Roof: 427 ft (130 m)

Technical details
- Floor count: 29

Design and construction
- Main contractor: AINA International

NTC Tower, or National Telecommunications Corporation Tower is a skyscraper located in Khartoum, Sudan, and is the tallest building in the nation. The 29 story office building was completed in 2009, construction having begun in 2005. The contractor is the Turkish company AINA International.

== Solar technology ==
This tower incorporates solar technologies in the building, for electricity generation (photovoltaics), as ways to lessen the demand for cooling, and light tubes to bring sunlight to the interior spaces.

== History ==
In 2024, amidst the Sudanese Civil War, the tower's middle section caught fire and was severely damaged. The parties involved -- the Rapid Support Forces (RSF) and Sudanese Armed Forces (SAF) -- accused each other of starting the fire. At the time of the incident, the building was occupied by the RSF.

== See also ==
- Skyscraper design and construction
- List of tallest buildings in Africa
