= Le'Mac =

Building in Nairobi, Kenya

Le' mac
- Interactive map of the Le' mac area

General information
- Type: Commercial & Residential
- Location: Nairobi, Kenya
- Coordinates: 1°15′42.3″S 36°47′21.9″E
- Construction started: 2012
- Completed: 2016
- Cost: KSh. 3.5 billion
- Client: Mark Properties

Height
- Height: 126 metres (413 ft)

Technical details
- Floor count: 30
- Floor area: 60,000 square metres (650,000 sq ft)
- Lifts/elevators: 8

Design and construction
- Architect: Sycum Solutions
- Main contractor: Nipsan Construction

Other information
- Parking: approx 400

Website
- https://www.mark-properties.com/

Le' Mac is a 24-storey (Excluding roof structure) commercial and residential building in the Westlands district of Nairobi, Kenya.

Le' Mac is owned by Mark Properties, a property developer in Nairobi. The tower was financed through private equity at a total of KSh. 3.5 billion (approximately US$35,000,000 as of 2015). L'e Mac's 30 levels are divided as:

- Three basement parking levels
- Ground floor banking and café amenities
- Storeys 1 through 6: open plan office space intended for banks, showrooms and other offices
- Storey 7: service level
- Storeys 8 through 23: residential
- Storeys 24 through 27: pool, gym, sauna/steam room and restaurant
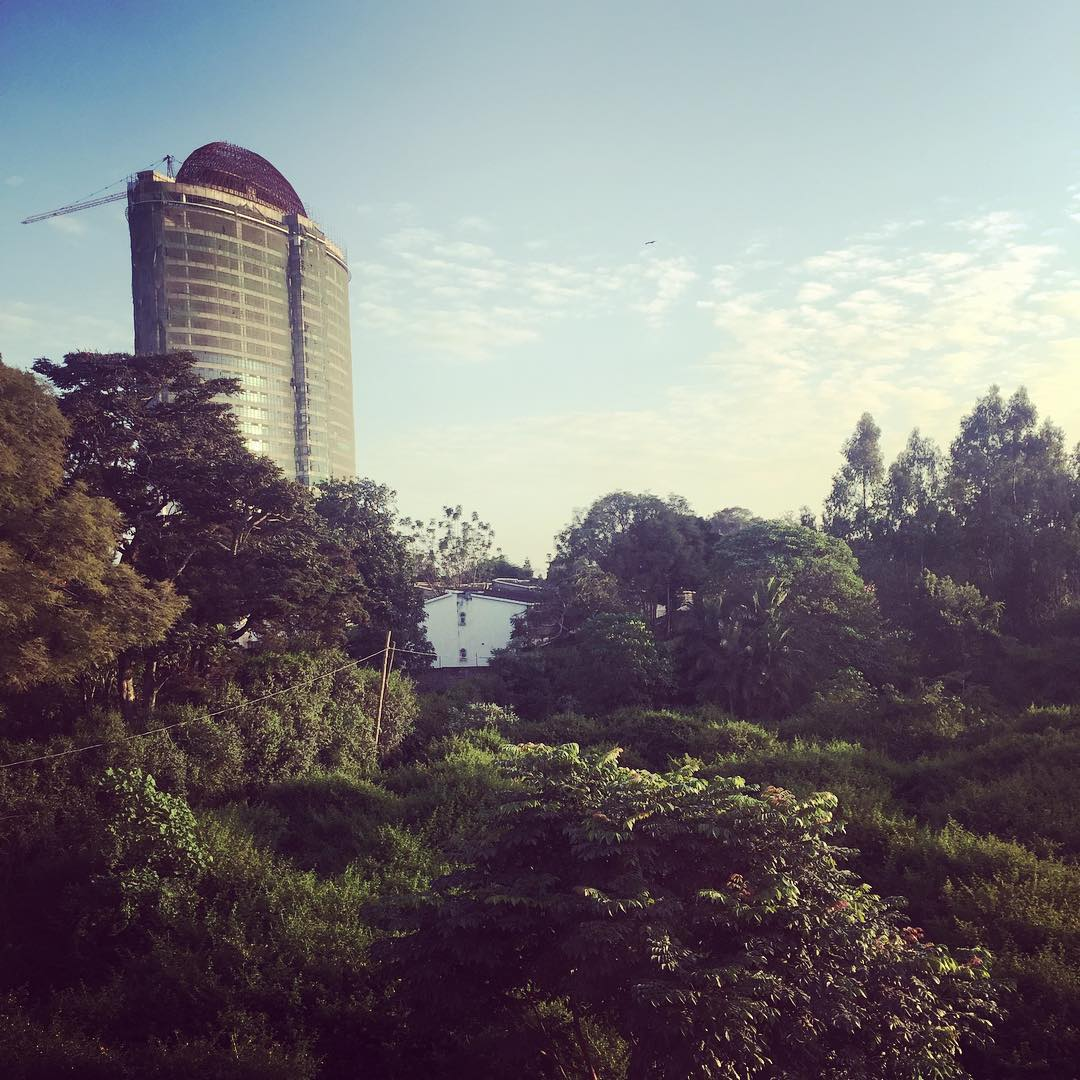
Final stages

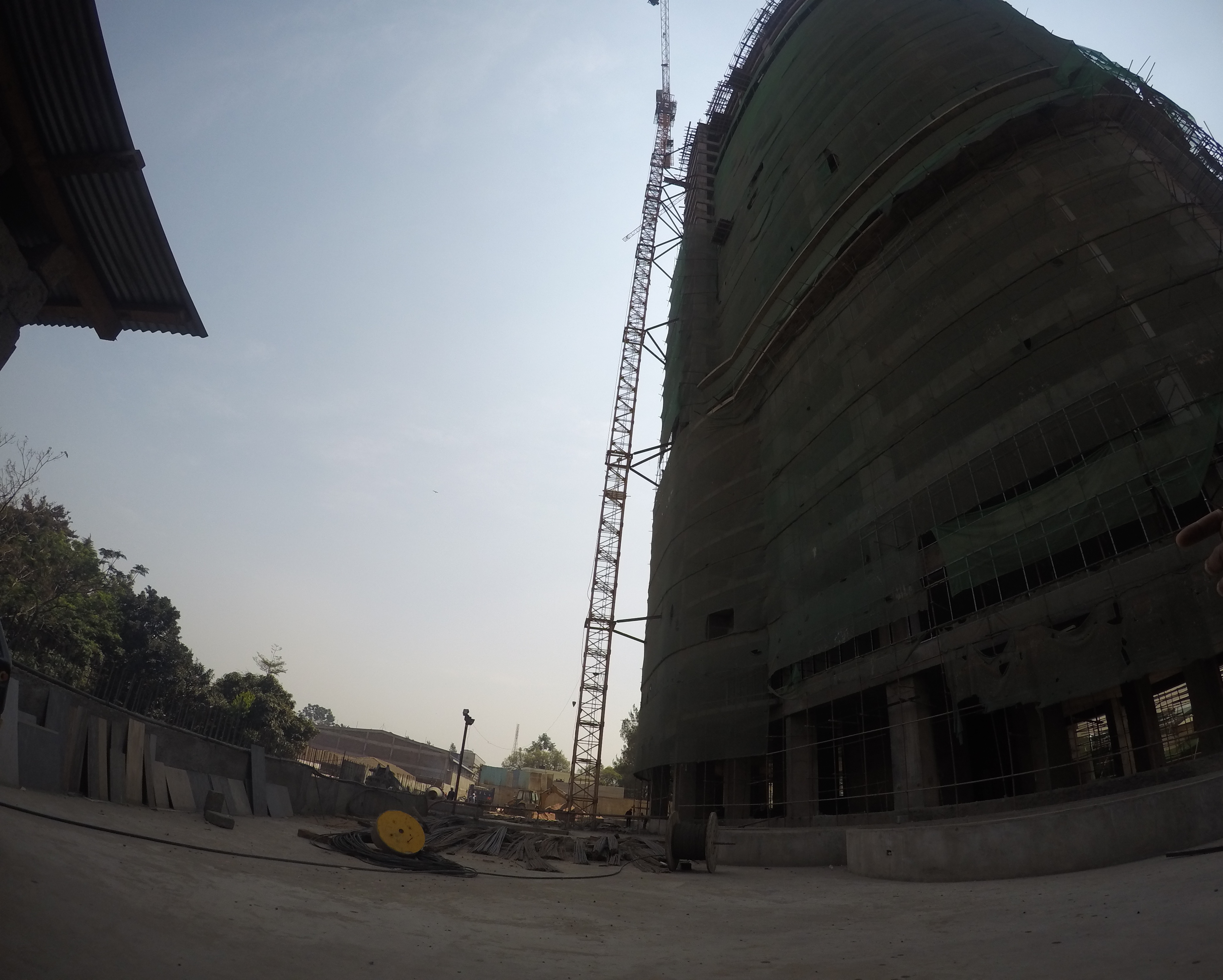
Under construction

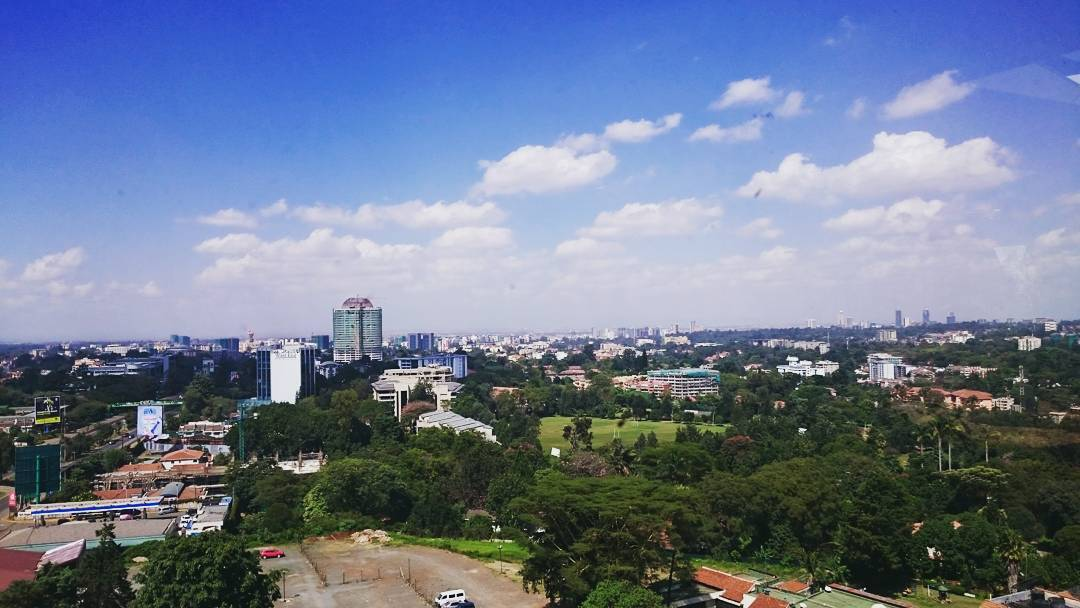
View from ABC Palace
