= List of tallest buildings in Tanzania =

This is a list of tallest buildings in Tanzania. In August 2021, it was revealed that the tallest building in the nation, Zanzibar Domino Tower, is in the pipeline for construction. The cost of building is reported to be US$1.3 billion, featuring 70 stories and located approximately 15 kilometres (9.3 mi) from the UNESCO World Heritage site of Stone Town.

== List ==
Was the tallest building in tanzania upon completion

#	Name	Image	Location	Height (≈ m)	Floors	Year
1	PPF Towers 2		Dar es Salaam	160	37	2019
2	Tanzania Ports Authority Tower		Mchafukoge, Ilala, Dar es Salaam	157	40	2016
3	PSPF Commercial Tower 1		Dar es Salaam	157	35	2014
5	MNF Square 1		Dar es Salaam	145	30	2019
5	MNF Square 2		Dar es Salaam	145	30	2019
7	Mzizima Commercial Tower 1		Dar es Salaam	134	35	2020
8	Mzizima Commercial Tower 2		Dar es Salaam	126	33	2020
9	Rita Tower		Dar es Salaam	114.8	30	2013
10	Millennium Tower		Dar es Salaam	103.3	27	2014
11	Uhuru Heights		Dar es Salaam	103.3	27	2012
12	Umoja wa Vijana Towers		Dar es Salaam	95.65	25	2012
13	PSPF Golden Jubilee House		Dar es Salaam	92	24	2011
14	Morocco Square Office Tower 1	Morocco Square Office Tower 1	Dar es Salaam	88	22	2018
15	Sky Tower		Dar es Salaam	84	22	2019
16	Quality Boulevard		Dar es Salaam	84	22	
17	City Plaza		Dar es Salaam	84	22	
18	Viva Towers		Dar es Salaam	80	21	2012
19	Benjamin William Mkapa Pensions Tower		Dar es Salaam	80	21	2014
20	NSSF Mafao House		Dar es Salaam	77	20	2019
21	NHC Morocco Square Office Tower 2		Dar es Salaam	77	20	2019
22	Ushirika Tower		Dar es Salaam	77	20	2014
23	Bank of Tanzania Tower 1		Dar es Salaam	77	20	2006
23	Bank of Tanzania Tower 2		Dar es Salaam	77	20	2006
25	Palm Residency		Dar es Salaam	73	19	2018
26	Samora Tower		Dar es Salaam	73	19	2014
27	Pan African Postal Union		Arusha	69.82	17	2021
28	Crystal Tower 1		Dar es Salaam	69	18	2014
29	Crystal Tower 2		Dar es Salaam	69	18	2014
30	Mindu Place		Dar es Salaam	69	18	2011
31	Girl Guides Building		Dar es Salaam	69	18	2011?
32	Empire Residency		Dar es Salaam	69	18	2015
33	NHC Building Plot 927/19		Dar es Salaam	69	20	2020
34	Sun Plaza		Dar es Salaam	65	17	2017
35	Neelkanth Tower		Dar es Salaam	65	17	2017
36	Krishna Tower		Dar es Salaam	65	17	2017
37	PPF Tower		Dar es Salaam	61	16	1999
38	NIC Life Tower		Dar es Salaam	61	16	
39	Ngorongoro Conservation Building		Arusha	58	15	
40	Wakulima Eco-Residence Tower A		Dar es Salaam	57	15	2015
41	Wakulima Eco-Residence Tower B		Dar es Salaam	57	15	2015
42	GEPF Tower		Dar es Salaam	57	15	2014
43	Canal Residency		Dar es Salaam	57	15	2011
44	Parrot Hotel		Arusha	55	14	2014
45	Fakyat		Dar es Salaam	54	14	
46	Tan House		Dar es Salaam	54	14	2014
47	Extelecoms House		Dar es Salaam	54	14	1993
48	Blue Pearl Hotel		Dar es Salaam	49	13	2000s?
49	Express Hotel		Dar es Salaam	49	13	2013
50	Mawasiliano Towers (Tanzania Communication Regulatory Authority)		Dar es Salaam	49	13	2012
51	IT Plaza		Dar es Salaam	49	13	2014
52	United Bank of Africa		Dar es Salaam	48	13	
53	NIC Pension Plaza II		Dar es Salaam	48	13	
54	Mafao House		Arusha	47	12	
55	Hugo Plaza		Arusha	47	12	
56	Naura Springs Hotel		Arusha	47	12	
57	Ohio Street Park		Dar es Salaam	46	12	2010
58	IPS Building		Dar es Salaam	43.05	12	1971
59	NSSF Plaza		Arusha	43	11	2012
60	New Africa Hotel		Dar es Salaam	38	10	
61	Sukari House		Dar es Salaam	34	9	
62	Diamond Plaza		Dar es Salaam	30	8	
63	Kempinski Hotel		Dar es Salaam	30	8	
64	NIC Pension Plaza I		Dar es Salaam	29	8	

== Timeline of tallest buildings ==
#	Name	Image	City	Height (m)	Floors	Year
1971-1993	Industrial Promotion Services Tower		Dar es Salaam	46	12	1971
1993-1999	Extelcoms House		Dar es Salaam	53	14	1993
1999-2006	PPF Tower		Dar es Salaam	61	16	1999
2006-2011	Benjamin William Mkapa Pensions Tower		Dar es Salaam	80	21	2006
2011-2012	PSPF House		Dar es Salaam	92	24	2011
2012-2013	Uhuru Heights		Dar es Salaam	103	27	2012
2013-2014	Rita Tower		Dar es Salaam	114	30	2013
Since 2014	PSPF Commercial Towers		Dar es Salaam	153	35	2014
