= The Leonardo (Sandton) =

Skyscraper in Sandton, South Africa

- The Leonardo (middle) in 2020
- Alternative names: 75 on Maude

Record height
- Tallest in Africa from mid-April to 29 April 2019^{[I]}
- Preceded by: Carlton Centre
- Surpassed by: Great Mosque of Algiers Tower

General information
- Status: Completed
- Type: Mixed-use
- Location: Sandton, Johannesburg, South Africa
- Coordinates: 26°6′15.2″S 28°3′19.96″E
- Groundbreaking: 17 November 2015
- Construction started: 2015
- Completed: 2019; 7 years ago
- Cost: R2 billion
- Owner: Legacy Group

Height
- Roof: 234 metres (770 ft)

Technical details
- Floor count: 55

Design and construction
- Architect: Co-Arc International Architects
- Main contractor: Aveng Grinaker-LTA

Website
- theleonardo.co.za

The Leonardo is a 55-floor mixed-use property development in Sandton, Johannesburg, South Africa. The fourth tallest building in Africa and the tallest in South Africa and sub-Saharan Africa, it stands at a height of 234 metres (768 ft). The building stands at 75 Maude Street, approximately 100 metres from the Johannesburg Stock Exchange.

The development includes street level shops as well as an above ground podium, where a swimming pool, restaurant and several other facilities are located. The facilities are open to public use, and can be booked through Legacy Hotels and Resorts.

It has been announced that the 2100 square metre, 3 floor penthouse apartment will go on the market for R 180 million, which, if sold, will make this the most expensive sectional title property ever sold in South Africa. The entire structure cost R 2 billion and consists of 200 apartments and 11 floors of commercial office.

The design has changed significantly since it was announced and was originally scheduled to be designed by AMA architect firm and be completed by 2010.

On 17 November 2015, the Leonardo began construction. By late April 2018, the Leonardo was the tallest building in Sandton, exceeding the Sandton City Office tower which stands at 141 metres, and by mid April 2019, the Leonardo was topped out and was officially the tallest building in Africa until surpassed on 29 April 2019 by the Great Mosque of Algiers Tower in Algeria, standing at 264 metres (866 ft). The Leonardo is now the fourth tallest building on the continent following the completion in 2023 of the Mohammed VI Tower (250 metres (820 ft)) in Rabat, Morocco, and the 2024 completion of the Iconic Tower (393.8 metres (1,292 ft)) in Egypt's New Capital.

== Gallery ==
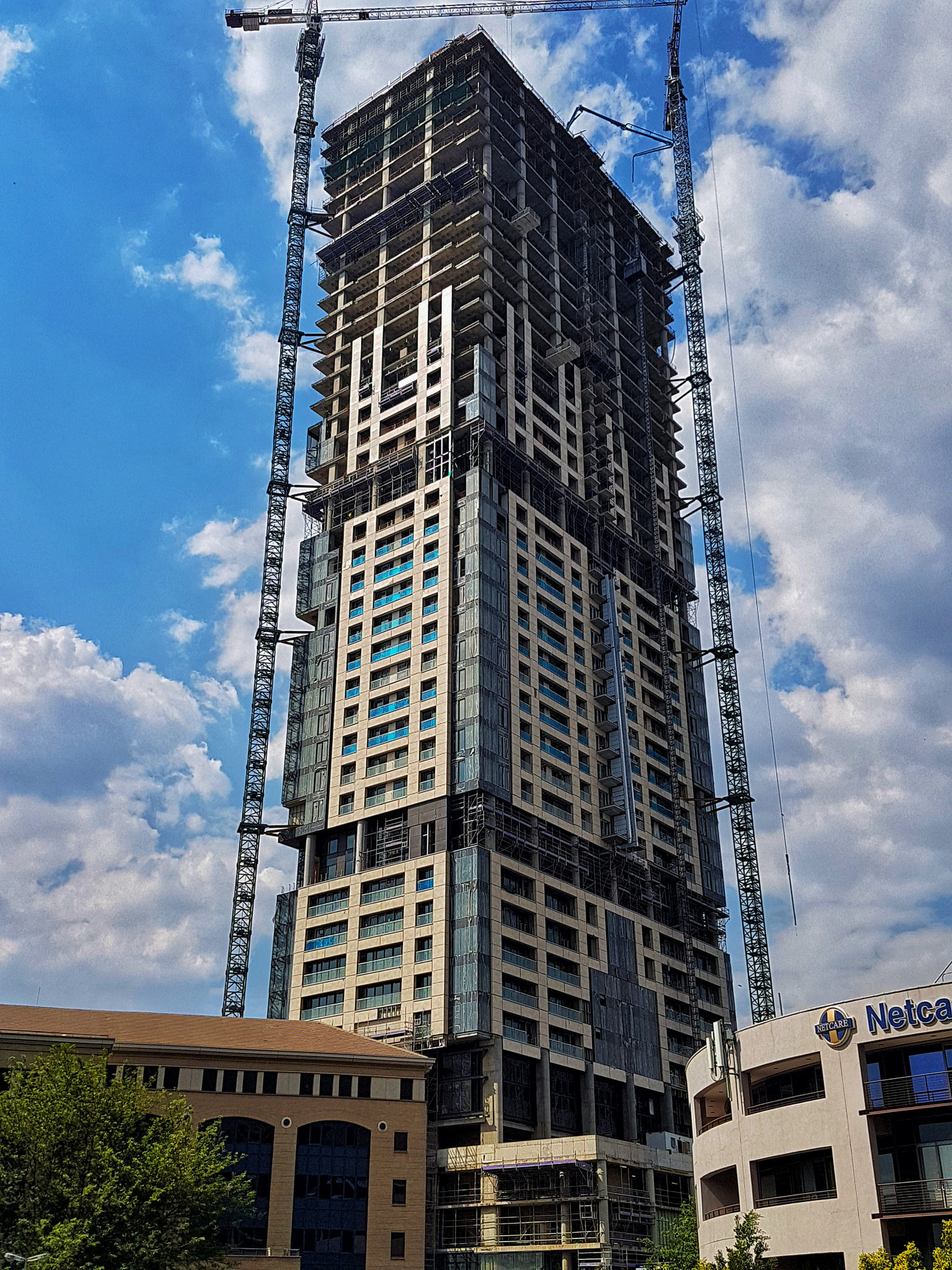
The tower under construction in 2018

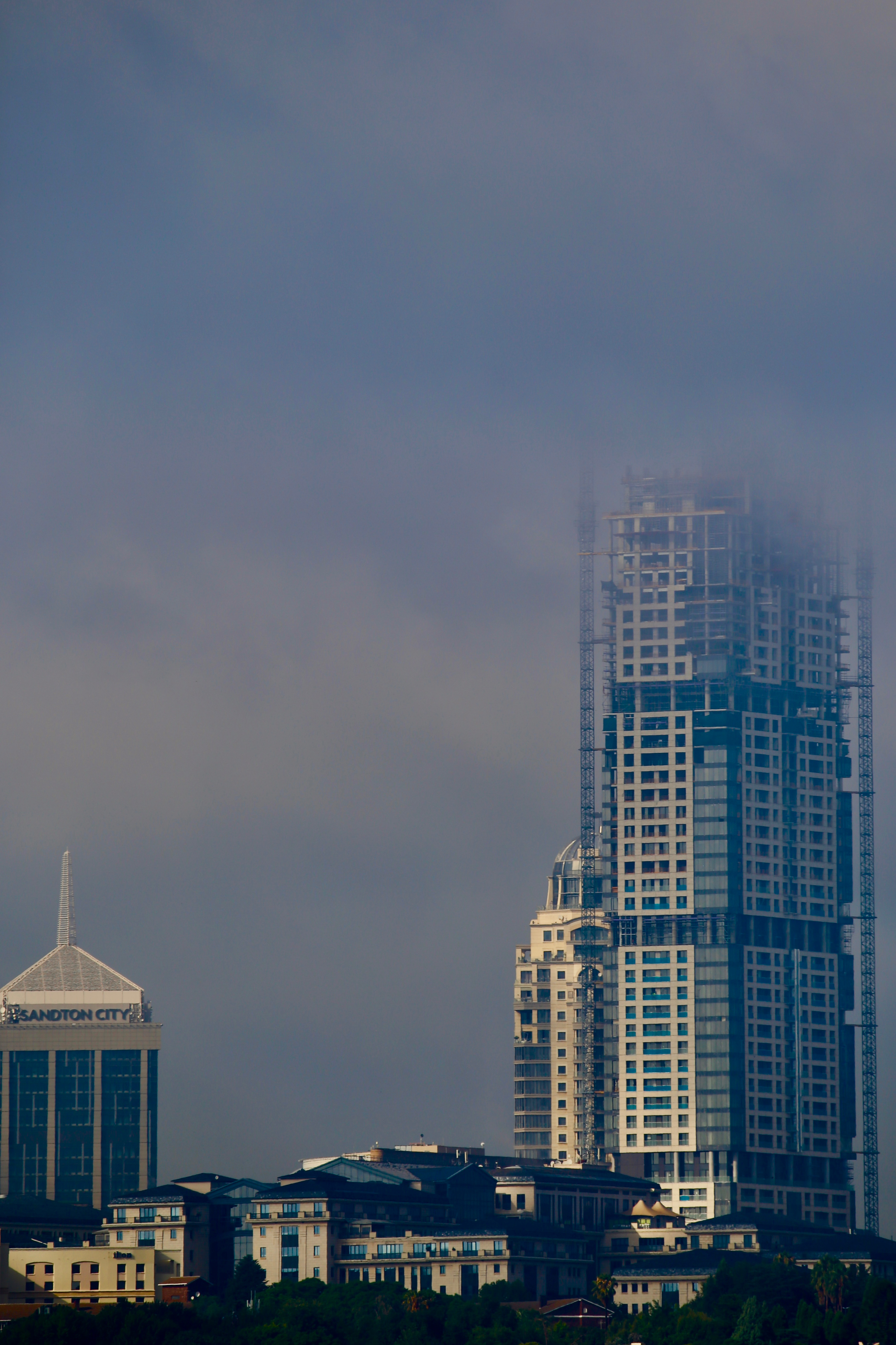
Tower partially obscured by haze

== See also ==
- List of tallest buildings and structures in South Africa
- List of tallest buildings in Africa

Records
Preceded by Carlton Centre	Tallest building in Africa; 234 m (770 ft); Mid-April 2019 – 29 April 2019	Succeeded by Great Mosque of Algiers Tower
Preceded by Carlton Centre	Tallest building in South Africa; 234 m (770 ft); 2019 – present	Current holder
Preceded by Carlton Centre	Tallest building in Johannesburg; 234 m (770 ft); 2019 – present	Current holder
Preceded by Ponte City	Building in Africa with the most floors 55; 2019 – 2024	Succeeded by Iconic Tower
