= Symbio-City =

General information
- Status: Vision
- Type: Multi use, Office, Shopping mall, Residential
- Location: Centurion, Gauteng, South Africa
- Cost: R18.2bn

Height
- Roof: 447 metres (1,470 ft)

Technical details
- Floor count: 110

Design and construction
- Architect: @126 Group

Symbio-City, also known as Centurion Symbio-City, is a proposed skyscraper in Centurion, Gauteng, South Africa. At 447 metres (1,467 ft), it will be the tallest building in Africa, if built. Plans consist of 3 buildings, the largest built over Centurion lake. All three buildings in the complex are envisioned to be over 100 metres (330 ft). It is proposed to reach 47 metres (154 ft) below ground.
