= Kigali Green Complex =

Skyscraper in Rwanda

- Location within Rwanda Location within Africa

General information
- Type: Mixed-use development
- Location: Kigali, Rwanda
- Coordinates: 01°56′42″S 30°03′44″E
- Construction started: January 2024
- Completed: December 2027 (Expected)

Height
- Height: 150 m (492 ft)

Technical details
- Floor count: 29 (+ 6 below ground)
- Floor area: 82,971 square metres (893,092 sq ft)

Design and construction
- Architect: Vavaki Architects
- Developer: Ultimate Developers Limited
- Main contractor: Shelter Group of Qatar

Kigali Green Complex (KGC), is a building under construction in Kigali, the capital of Rwanda and the largest city in that country. With 29 above-ground floors, the skyscraper is expected to be the tallest building in Kigali and Rwanda, at the time of completion. The design calls for an additional 6 underground floors.

== Location ==
The skyscraper is located in the central business district of Kigali, on a plot of land that measures 7,600 square metres (1.9 acres). This location is near the Kigali Convention Center and used to host the Rwanda Ministry of Justice. The geographical coordinates of this location are: 1°56'42.0"S, 30°03'44.0"E (Latitude:-1.945000; Longitude:30.062222).

== Overview ==
The 29 storied high-rise is under development by Ultimate Developers Limited (UDL), a 100 percent subsidiary of the Rwanda Social Security Board (RSSB). KGC is under development to generate income for the RSSB stakeholders and provide upscale rentable space for corporations, businesses and individuals, in Kigali's CBD. As of December 2023, according to UDL, as reported by The New Times, an anchor tenant had been secured to take up 27 percent of rentable space in the mixed-use development.

The high-rise is reported to be the "1st ever Gold Rated LEED Green, Well and Smart Mix-Use Complex in Rwanda". Amenities include bank space, office space, retail space, and 430 car parking spaces.

== Other considerations ==
The architectural consultant is reported to be Vavaki Architects. The engineering, procurement and construction (EPC) contract was awarded to the Shelter Group, headquartered in Doha, Qatar, with offices in the Middle East, Europe and Africa. Commercial commissioning is planned for 2027.
