= NECOM House =

Skyscraper located in Lagos

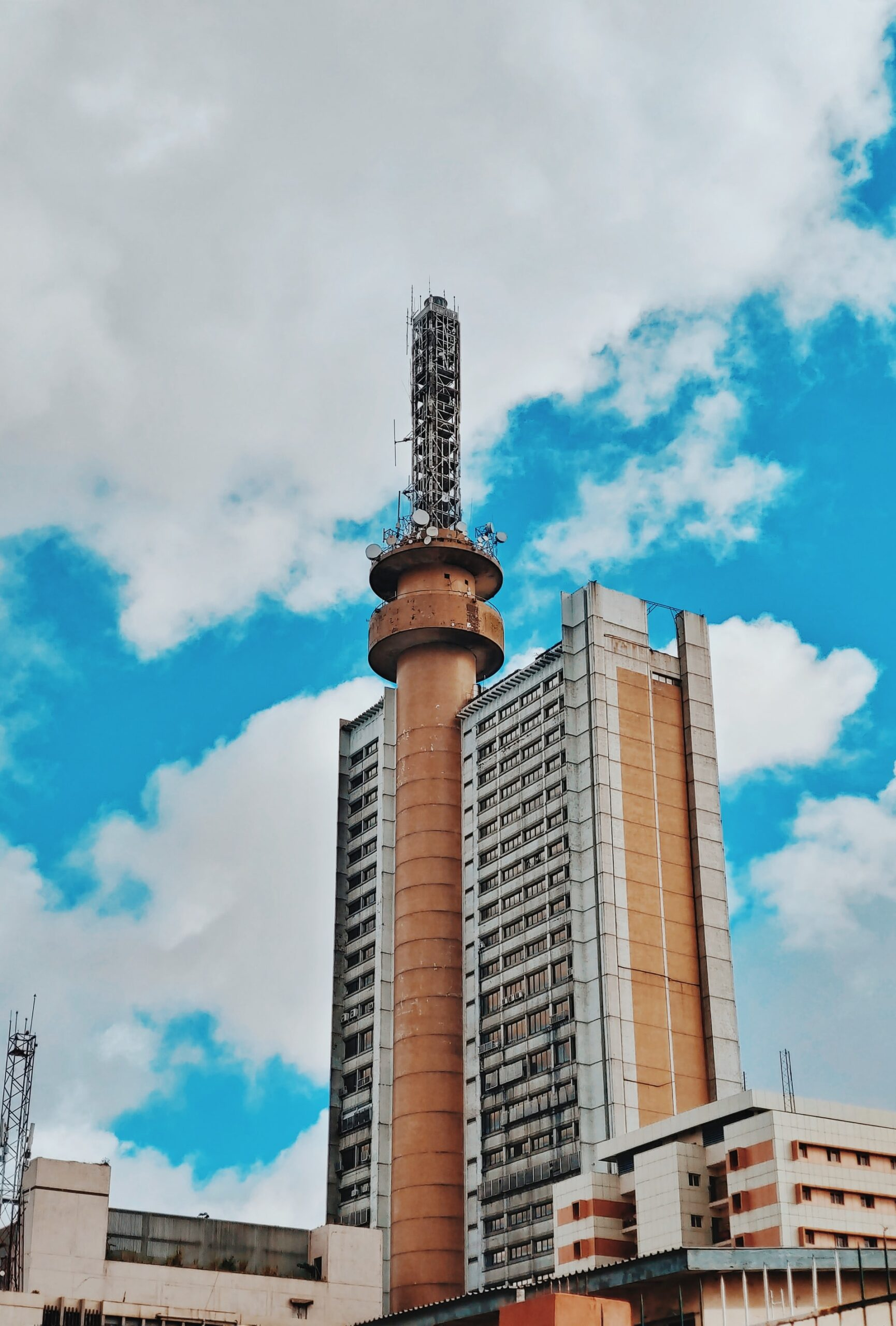
- NECOM Building in 2023

Record height
- Tallest in West Africa from 1979 to present^{[I]}
- Preceded by: Cocoa House

General information
- Status: Completed
- Type: Commercial
- Location: Marina, Lagos Island, Lagos, Lagos State, Nigeria
- Coordinates: 6.4462161°N 3.3975961°E
- Opening: 1979

Height
- Roof: 160 m (525 ft)

Technical details
- Floor count: 32

Design and construction
- Architects: Nickson Borys & Partners
- Structural engineer: Oscar Faber & Partners in association with Obi Obembe & Associates
- Main contractor: Costain Group

NECOM House (formerly NITEL Tower and before that, the NET Building) is a skyscraper located in Lagos. The 32-storey building was completed in 1979, and houses the headquarters of NITEL. The communications spire at the top of the tower serves as a lighthouse beacon for Lagos Harbour. The building is constructed of concrete. The building was the tallest in West Africa at the time of completion.

== Fire ==
Necom House has suffered two fires since it was built; one in 1983 which caused considerable damage to the building, and the other in 2015 which affected the top of the building.

== Gallery ==
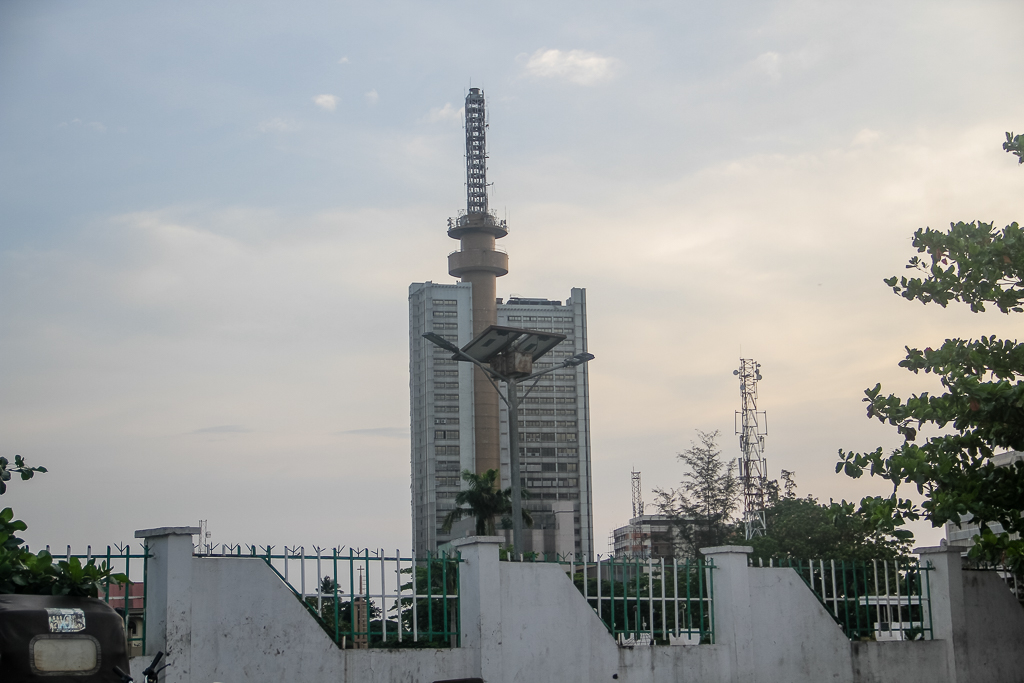

== See also ==
- Skyscraper design and construction
- List of tallest buildings in Nigeria
- List of tallest buildings in Africa
