= List of tallest buildings in Zimbabwe =

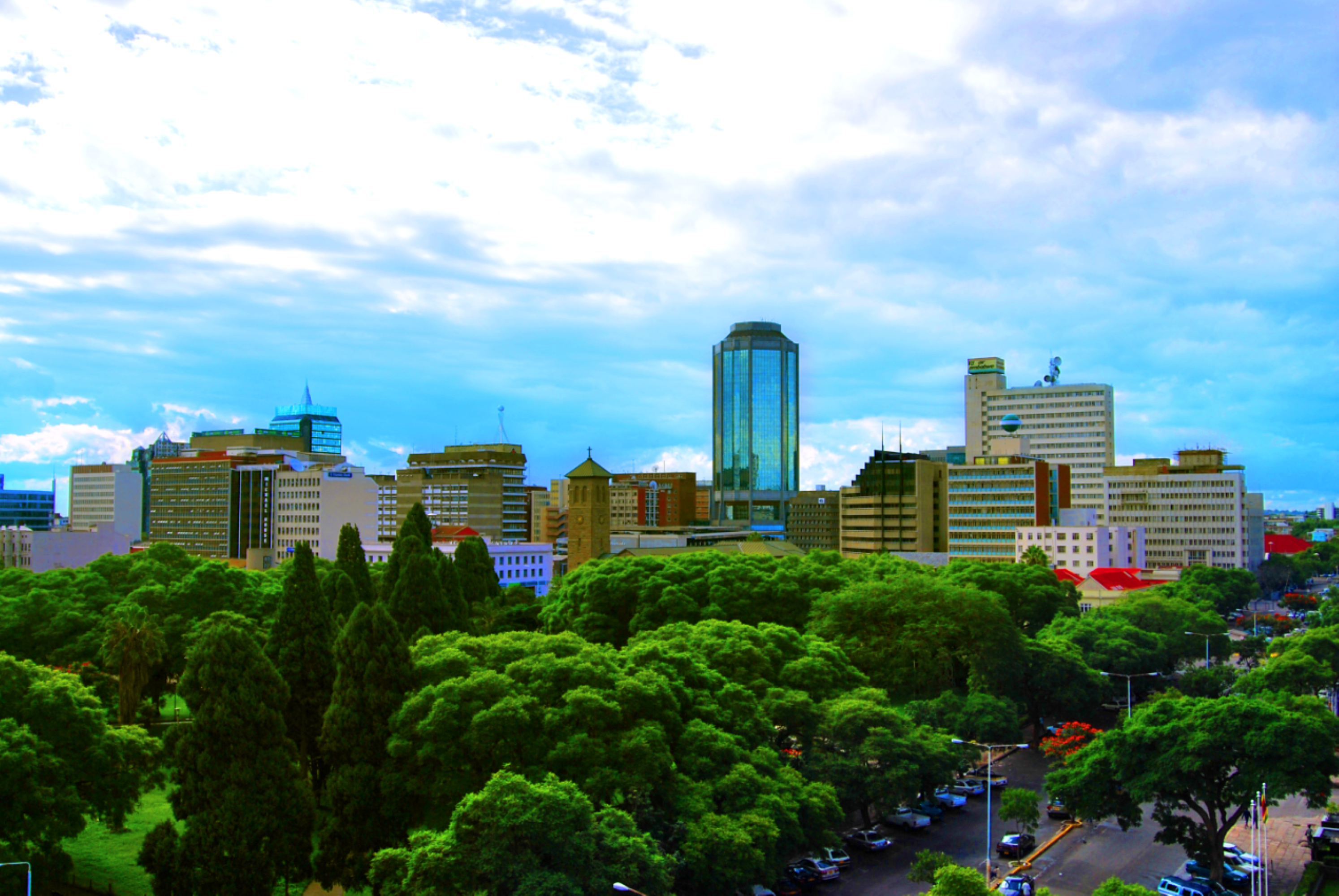
The CBD of Harare

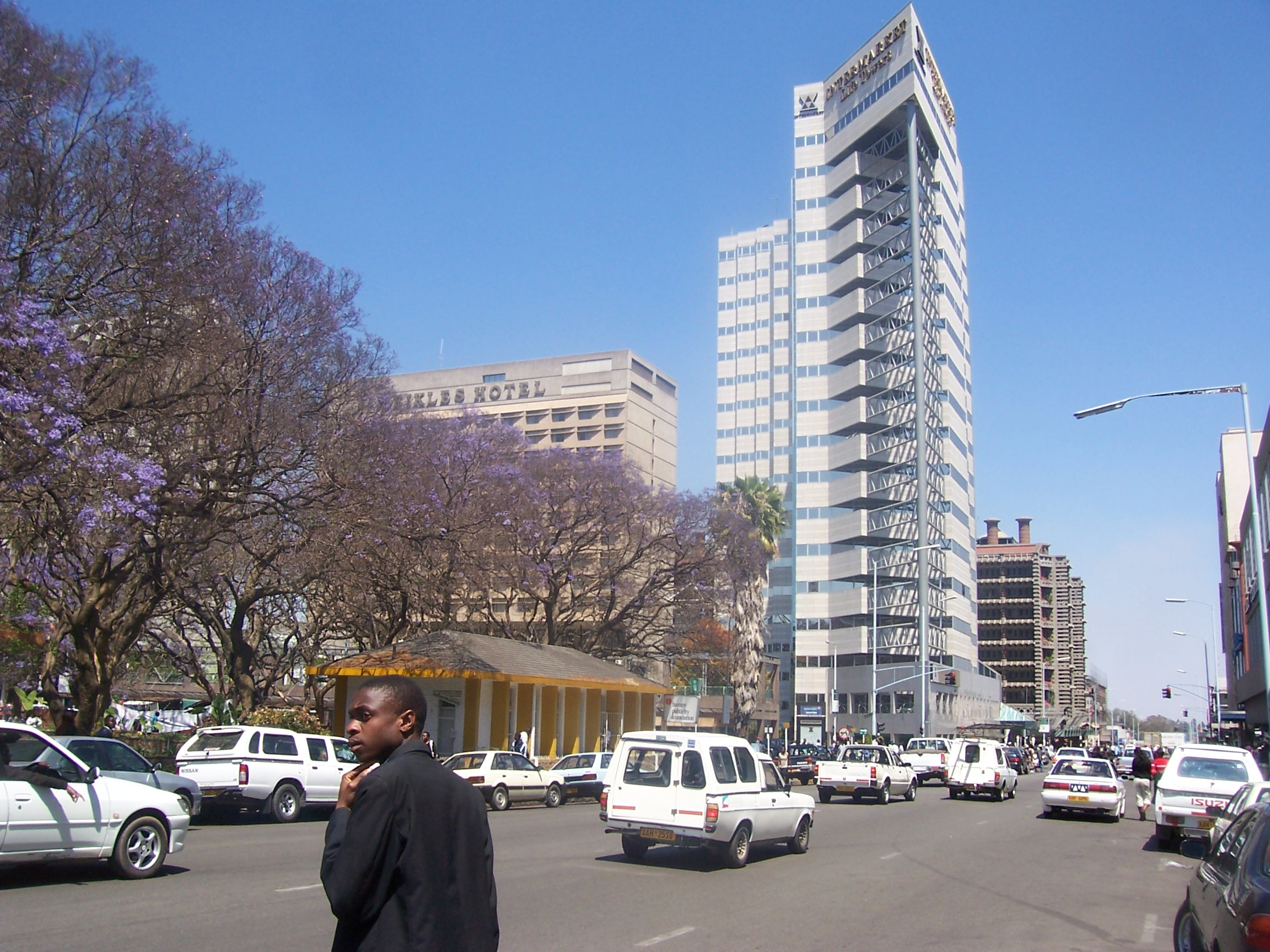
Modern skyscrapers in Harare

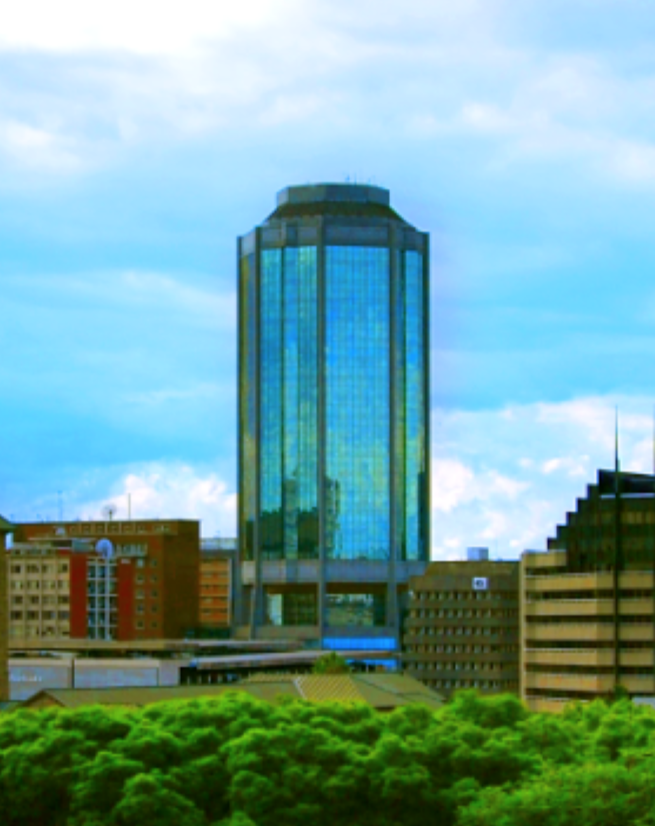
The Reserve Bank of Zimbabwe

Zimbabwe has 13 buildings that stand taller than 70 metres (230 ft). The tallest building in Zimbabwe is the RBZ (28 storey, 120 m [390 ft] tall) located in the capital city, Harare.

Harare, Zimbabwe's capital city, is where most of the country's tallest buildings are concentrated. The tallest building in Zimbabwe is the 28 storey, New Reserve Bank building in Harare that is 120 m (394 ft) tall.

As of April 2012, the country has four skyscrapers over 100 m (328 ft) and 30 high-rise buildings that exceed 35 m (115 ft) in height.

Major construction projects underway include African Export-Import Bank (Afreximbank) Situated along Herbert Chitepo Avenue, near Seventh Street/Livingstone Avenue in central Harare.

== Buildings ==
This list ranks Zimbabwe high-rises that stand at least 70 m (230 ft) tall, based on standard height measurement. This includes spires and architectural details but does not include antenna masts.

was the tallest building in zimbabwe upon completion

Buildings completed as of February, 2011
Building	Height	Floors	Completed	City
New Reserve Bank Tower	120 m (390 ft)	28	1997	Harare
NRZ Headquarters	110 m (360 ft)	23	1985	Bulawayo
Joina City	105 m (344 ft)	24	2010	Harare
Karigamombe Centre	92 m (302 ft)	20	1985	Harare
Livingstone House	80 m (260 ft)	20	1960	Harare
Millennium Towers	77 m (253 ft)	19	2000	Harare
Earl Grey Building	76 m (249 ft)	21	??	Harare
Kaguvi Building	73 m (240 ft)	18	??	Harare
Old Mutual Centre	72 m (236 ft)	18	??	Harare
Kenilworth Towers	75 m (246 ft)	20	1988	Bulawayo

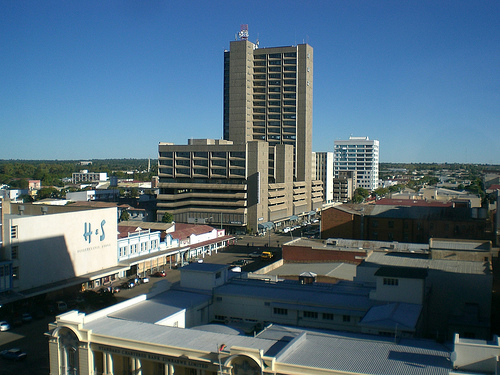
Bulawayo CBD

== See also ==
- List of tallest buildings in Africa
- List of tallest buildings in South Africa
