= Commercial Bank of Ethiopia Headquarters =

Skyscraper in Addis Ababa, Ethiopia

- የኢትዮጵያ ንግድ ባንክ ዋና መስሪያ ቤት
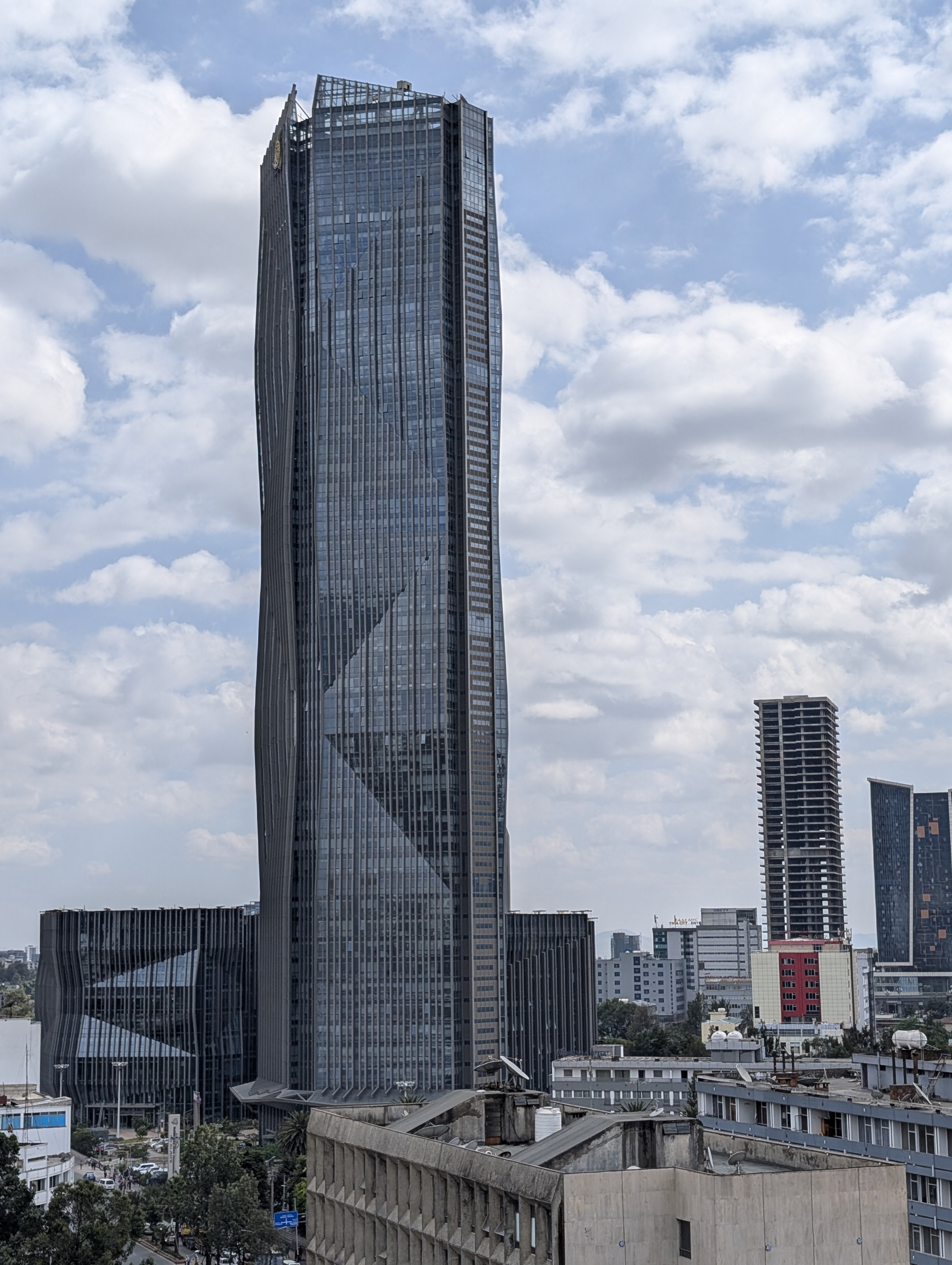
- Interactive map of the Commercial Bank of Ethiopia Headquarters area

General information
- Status: Completed
- Location: Addis Ababa, Ethiopia
- Coordinates: 9.0165513°N 38.7543284°E
- Construction started: June 27, 2015
- Topped-out: November 11, 2018
- Completed: February 13, 2022
- Cost: ETB 5.3 billion
- Owner: Commercial Bank of Ethiopia

Height
- Roof: 209.3 m (687 ft)

Technical details
- Floor count: 53
- Floor area: 150,000 m^{2} (1,614,587 sq ft)
- Lifts/elevators: 24

Design and construction
- Architecture firm: Henn GmbH
- Main contractor: China State Construction Engineering Corporation

The Commercial Bank of Ethiopia Headquarters, also known as the CBE Tower, is a skyscraper in Addis Ababa, Ethiopia, that reached completion on February 13, 2022, establishing itself as the tallest building in Ethiopia. Rising to an architectural height of 209.3 m (687 ft), the tower serves as the corporate headquarters for the state-owned Commercial Bank of Ethiopia, which is the largest banking institution in the nation. The skyscraper also stands as the tallest building in East Africa, as well as the tallest building in Sub-Saharan Africa outside of South Africa.

== History ==
Construction commenced in 2015 under a contract valued at 5,300,000,000 Ethiopian birr with the China State Construction Engineering Corporation. The foundation stone was officially laid on June 27, 2015, and the building was subsequently topped out during the second half of 2019. However, the installation of the exterior cladding faced significant delays due to a severe foreign currency shortage in Ethiopia. This economic constraint restricted the ability of domestic businesses to fund necessary imports, which adversely impacted the financial operations of the bank while it maintained dominance over the majority of national banking activities in 2020.

The building was originally scheduled for completion on January 19, 2019. However, as of August 2018, the construction timeline was revised, postponing the projected completion date to 2020.

In February 2022, the skyscraper was officially inaugurated during a ceremony scheduled to coincide directly with the 80th anniversary celebration of the Commercial Bank of Ethiopia.

== Site ==
The development site occupies an 18,000 sq m plot situated on Ras Desta Damtew Road in Addis Ababa, Ethiopia.

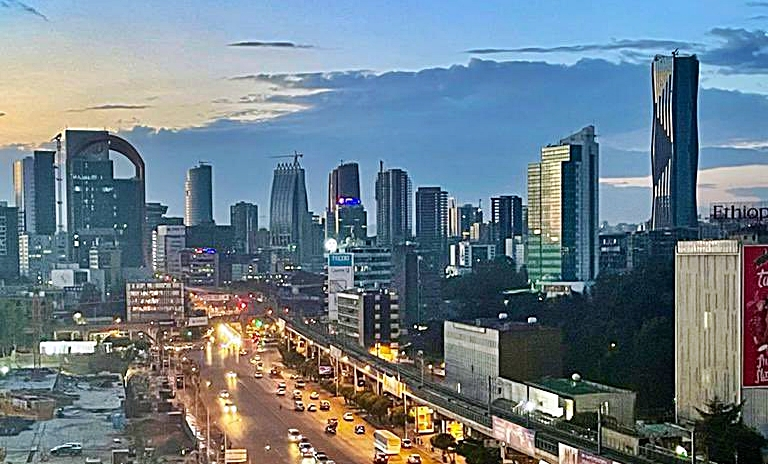
The Commercial Bank of Ethiopia Headquarters, standing as the tallest building in the city, is visible in the upper right quadrant of the skyline.

== Design ==
Rising to an architectural height of 209.3 m (687 ft), the skyscraper encompasses 53 total floors, featuring 49 above-ground floors and 4 basement levels. The primary structural profile of the tower is supported by two five-story podium components and descends into a 20 m (66 ft) deep underground parking facility. The real estate development contains a total gross floor area of 150,000 square meters.

The interior layout incorporates eight conference auditoriums, a dedicated emergency disaster shelter, a public observation tower, and two premium restaurants situated on the uppermost floors.

As of 2026, the skyscraper stands as the tallest building in both Ethiopia and East Africa.

== See also ==
- List of tallest buildings in Africa
