= List of tallest buildings and structures in Egypt =

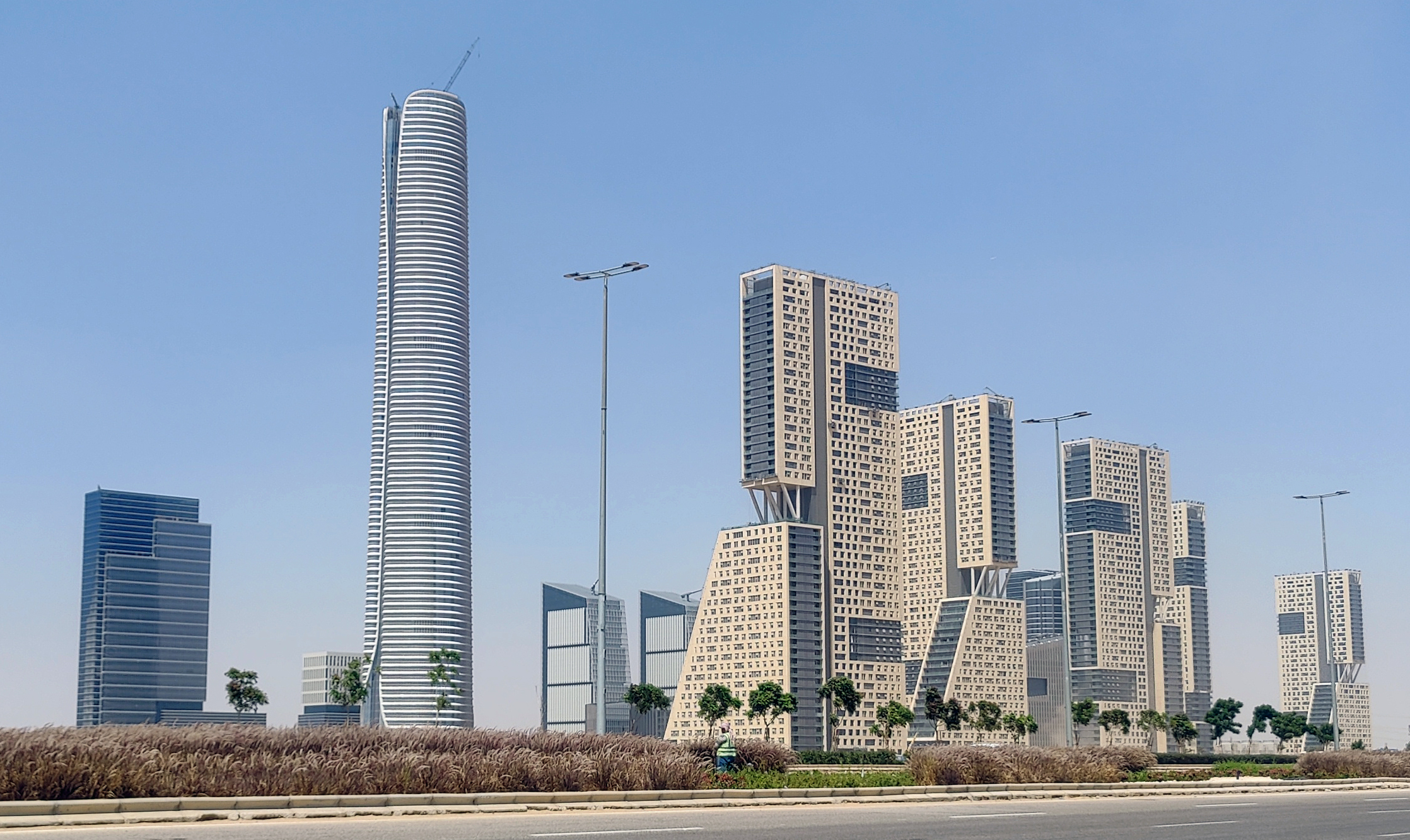
Central Business District at The New Capital

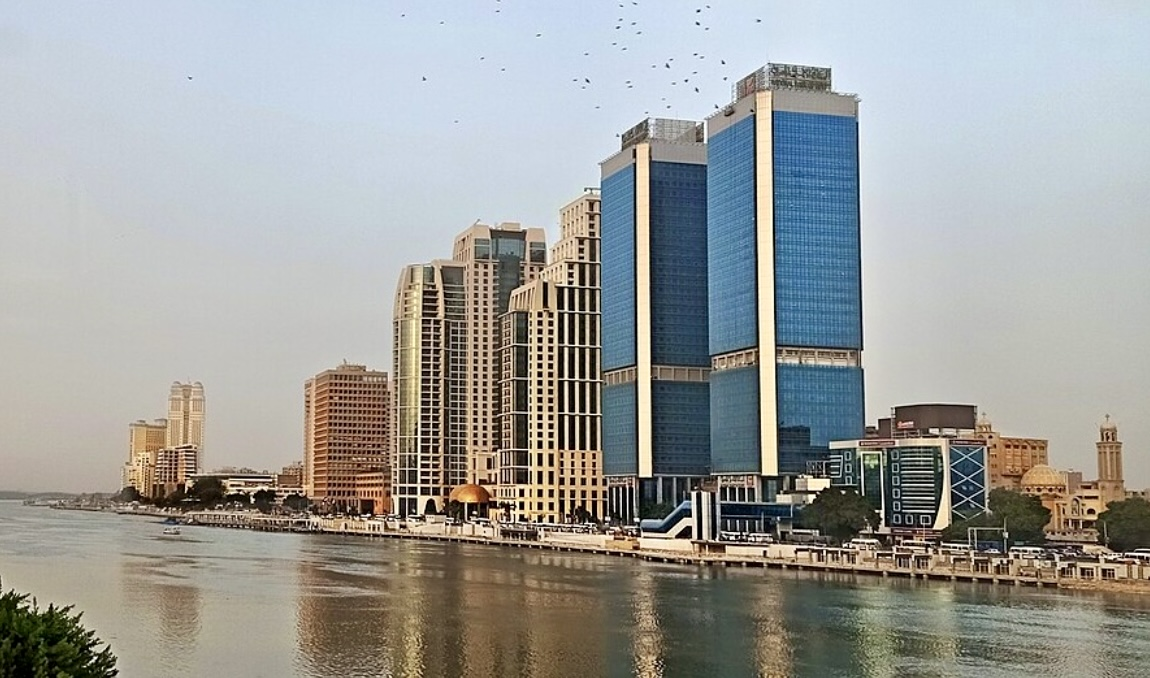
Skyline of Cairo

This list ranks the tallest buildings and structures in Egypt by height. As of 2026, Egypt holds the record for the most skyscrapers in Africa, with over 60 buildings taller than 100 m (328 ft) and over 20 buildings exceeding 150 m (492 ft). The tallest building and structure in the country is the 393.8 m (1,292 ft) tall Iconic Tower, located in The New Capital, which also holds the title of the tallest building in Africa.

The tallest pre-modern structure in Egypt is the Great Pyramid of Giza, which stands at 138.5 m (454 ft) and held the title of the world's tallest structure for over 3,800 years until it was surpassed by Lincoln Cathedral in 1311.

== Tallest buildings ==
Was the tallest building in Egypt upon completion
Indicates buildings that have been topped out but not yet completed

This list ranks skyscrapers in Egypt that stand at least 100 m (328 ft) tall, based on standard height measurement. This measurement is defined as the height to the architectural top, which includes spires and permanent architectural features, but excludes antenna masts. The "Year" column indicates the year in which a building was completed. An equal sign (=) following a rank indicates that two or more buildings share the same height.

Rank	Name	Image	City	Height m (ft)	Floors	Year	Notes	References
1	Iconic Tower		The New Capital	393.8 m (1,292 ft)	77	2024	Tallest building in Egypt since 2024. Tallest building in Africa. Tallest building completed in Egypt in the 2020s. 46th-tallest building in the world.	
2	Alamein Iconic Tower		New Alamein	291.8 m (957 ft)	67	2026	Tallest building in New Alamein. Tallest residential building in Egypt and Africa. Tallest all-reinforced concrete building in Africa. Topped out in October 2024.	
3=	Alamein Downtown Towers D01 Tower 1		New Alamein	207.8 m (682 ft)	56	2026		
3=	Alamein Downtown Towers D01 Tower 2		New Alamein	207.8 m (682 ft)	56	2026		
3=	Alamein Downtown Towers D01 Tower 3		New Alamein	207.8 m (682 ft)	56	2026		
3=	Alamein Downtown Towers D01 Tower 4		New Alamein	207.8 m (682 ft)	56	2026		
7	New Administrative Capital Building D01		The New Capital	196 m (643 ft)	49	2024	Tallest residential building in Egypt from 2024 to 2026.	
8=	New Administrative Capital Building D02		The New Capital	176 m (577 ft)	45	2024		
8=	New Administrative Capital Building D03		The New Capital	176 m (577 ft)	45	2024		
10	New Administrative Capital Building C01		The New Capital	174 m (571 ft)	35	2024	Tallest office building in Egypt.	
11=	Gate Towers East		New Alamein	170 m (558 ft)	44	2025		
11=	Gate Towers West		New Alamein	170 m (558 ft)	44	2025		
11=	New Administrative Capital Building C04		The New Capital	170 m (558 ft)	34	2024		
14	Fouda Tower		Cairo	166 m (545 ft)	50	N/D	Tallest building in Cairo. Also known as Zamalek Tower. Topped out, but never completed due to the absence of an underground parking garage. Tallest unused building in Egypt.	
15=	New Administrative Capital Building C11		The New Capital	160 m (525 ft)	27	2025		
15=	New Administrative Capital Building C12		The New Capital	160 m (525 ft)	27	2024		
17=	New Administrative Capital Building C07		The New Capital	159.9 m (525 ft)	32	2024		
17=	New Administrative Capital Building C08		The New Capital	159.9 m (525 ft)	32	2024		
19	New Administrative Capital Building D04		The New Capital	159.8 m (524 ft)	40	2024		
20	El Salam Tower		Alexandria	155 m (509 ft)	36	N/D	Tallest building in Alexandria. Designed by Sabbour Consulting.	
21	New Administrative Capital Building D05		The New Capital	152.5 m (500 ft)	38	2024		
22	Ministry of Foreign Affairs		Cairo	143 m (469 ft)	39	1994	Tallest building in Egypt from 1994 to 2024. Tallest building completed in Egypt in the 1990s.	
23=	Hilton Cairo Grand Nile		Cairo	142 m (466 ft)	41	2002	Originally opened in 1974 as the Hotel Méridien Cairo, the complex was expanded in 2001 with the addition of a 41-story tower. Tallest building completed in Egypt in the 2000s. Located in El Manial.	
23=	Nile City North Tower		Cairo	142 m (466 ft)	34	2002		
23=	Nile City South Tower		Cairo	142 m (466 ft)	34	2002		
26=	El Maadi Residential Tower 13		Cairo	140 m (459 ft)	42	1987	Tallest building in Egypt from 1987 to 1994, along with El Maadi Residential Towers 14–18. Tallest building completed in Egypt in the 1980s. Located in Maadi.	
26=	El Maadi Residential Tower 14		Cairo	140 m (459 ft)	42	1987		
26=	El Maadi Residential Tower 15		Cairo	140 m (459 ft)	42	1987		
26=	El Maadi Residential Tower 16		Cairo	140 m (459 ft)	42	1987		
26=	El Maadi Residential Tower 17		Cairo	140 m (459 ft)	42	1987		
26=	El Maadi Residential Tower 18		Cairo	140 m (459 ft)	42	1987		
32	The St. Regis Cairo		Cairo	139.5 m (458 ft)	32	2021	Also known as Nile Corniche Tower 2. Widely misreported as 180 m (591 ft).	
33	The Residences at The St. Regis Cairo		Cairo	136.2 m (447 ft)	34	2021	Also known as Nile Corniche Tower 1.	
34=	National Bank of Egypt Northern Tower		Cairo	135 m (443 ft)	33	1986	Tallest building in Egypt from 1986 to 1987, along with National Bank of Egypt Southern Tower. Recladded in 2008.	
34=	National Bank of Egypt Southern Tower		Cairo	135 m (443 ft)	33	1986	Tallest building in Egypt from 1986 to 1987, along with National Bank of Egypt Northern Tower. Recladded in 2008.	
34=	San Stefano Grand Plaza		Alexandria	135 m (443 ft)	31	2006		
37	Bank Misr Building		Cairo	130 m (427 ft)	29	1985	Tallest building in Egypt from 1985 to 1986.	
38	Four Seasons Hotel Cairo at Nile Plaza		Cairo	127.1 m (417 ft)	31	1999		
39=	El Maadi Residential Tower 5		Cairo	122 m (400 ft)	35	1987		
39=	El Maadi Residential Tower 6		Cairo	122 m (400 ft)	35	1987		
39=	El Maadi Residential Tower 7		Cairo	122 m (400 ft)	35	1987		
39=	El Maadi Residential Tower 8		Cairo	122 m (400 ft)	35	1987		
39=	El Maadi Residential Tower 9		Cairo	122 m (400 ft)	35	1987		
39=	El Maadi Residential Tower 10		Cairo	122 m (400 ft)	35	1987		
39=	El Maadi Residential Tower 11		Cairo	122 m (400 ft)	35	1987		
39=	El Maadi Residential Tower 12		Cairo	122 m (400 ft)	35	1987		
47	Residences Roda Island		Cairo	118 m (387 ft)	39	N/D		
48=	Ramses Hilton & World Trade Center		Cairo	110 m (361 ft)	36	1980	Tallest building in Egypt from 1980 to 1985.	
48=	Hilton World Trade Center Residences I		Cairo	110 m (361 ft)	32	N/D		
50	Semiramis InterContinental Hotel		Cairo	107 m (351 ft)	29	1988		
51	Belmont Building		Cairo	106 m (348 ft)	31	1954	Tallest building in Egypt from 1954 to 1980. Tallest building in Africa from 1954 to 1965. Tallest building completed in Egypt in the 1950s. Also known as Thabet-Thabet Building.	
52	The Fairmont Cairo		Cairo	105 m (344 ft)	25	2010		
53=	Four Seasons Cairo at First Residence		Giza	103 m (338 ft)	30	1996	Tallest building in Giza.	
53=	Al Masa Tower 1		New Alamein	103 m (338 ft)	24	2021		
53=	Al Masa Tower 2		New Alamein	103 m (338 ft)	24	2021		
53=	Al Masa Tower 3		New Alamein	103 m (338 ft)	24	2021		
53=	Al Masa Tower 4		New Alamein	103 m (338 ft)	24	2021		
53=	Al Masa Tower 5		New Alamein	103 m (338 ft)	24	2021		
53=	Al Masa Tower 6		New Alamein	103 m (338 ft)	24	2021		
60=	Hilton World Trade Center Residences II		Cairo	100 m (328 ft)	32	N/D		
60=	Maspero Television Building		Cairo	100 m (328 ft)	30	1960	Also known as Radio & Television Building. Tallest building completed in Egypt in the 1960s.	
60=	Sofitel Cairo Downtown Nile		Cairo	100 m (328 ft)	30	1999	Formerly known as Conrad International Cairo Hotel.	
60=	El Maadi Residential Tower 1		Cairo	100 m (328 ft)	28	1987		
60=	Sofitel Cairo Nile El Gezirah Hotel		Cairo	100 m (328 ft)	27	1984	Formerly known as El Gezira Sheraton Hotel.	

== Timeline of tallest buildings ==
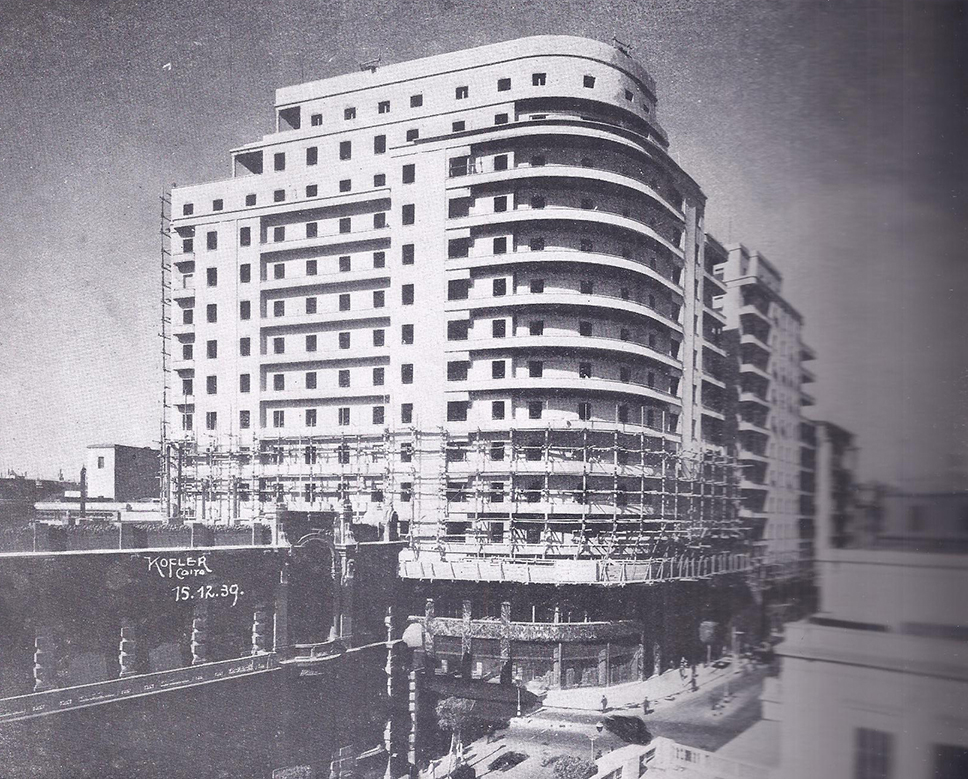
Built in 1940 as a symbol of modernity and luxury, the Immobilia Building is often considered Egypt’s first skyscraper and was the tallest building in the country until 1954.

This is a list of buildings that have previously held the title of the tallest building in Egypt.

Name	Years As Tallest	Height m (ft)	Floors	City	Notes
Iconic Tower	2024–Present	394 m (1,293 ft)	77	The New Capital	
Ministry of Foreign Affairs	1994–2024	143 m (469 ft)	39	Cairo	
El Maadi Residential Towers 13–18	1987–1994	140 m (459 ft)	42	Cairo	
National Bank of Egypt Towers	1986–1987	135 m (443 ft)	33	Cairo	
Bank Misr Building	1985–1986	130 m (427 ft)	29	Cairo	
Ramses Hilton & World Trade Center	1980–1985	110 m (361 ft)	36	Cairo	
Belmont Building	1954–1980	106 m (348 ft)	31	Cairo	
Immobilia Building	1940–1954	70 m (230 ft)	13	Cairo	

== Tallest structures ==
This list ranks structures and non-habitable buildings in Egypt that stand at least 100 m (328 ft) tall, based on standard height measurement. This includes spires, architectural details, and antenna masts.

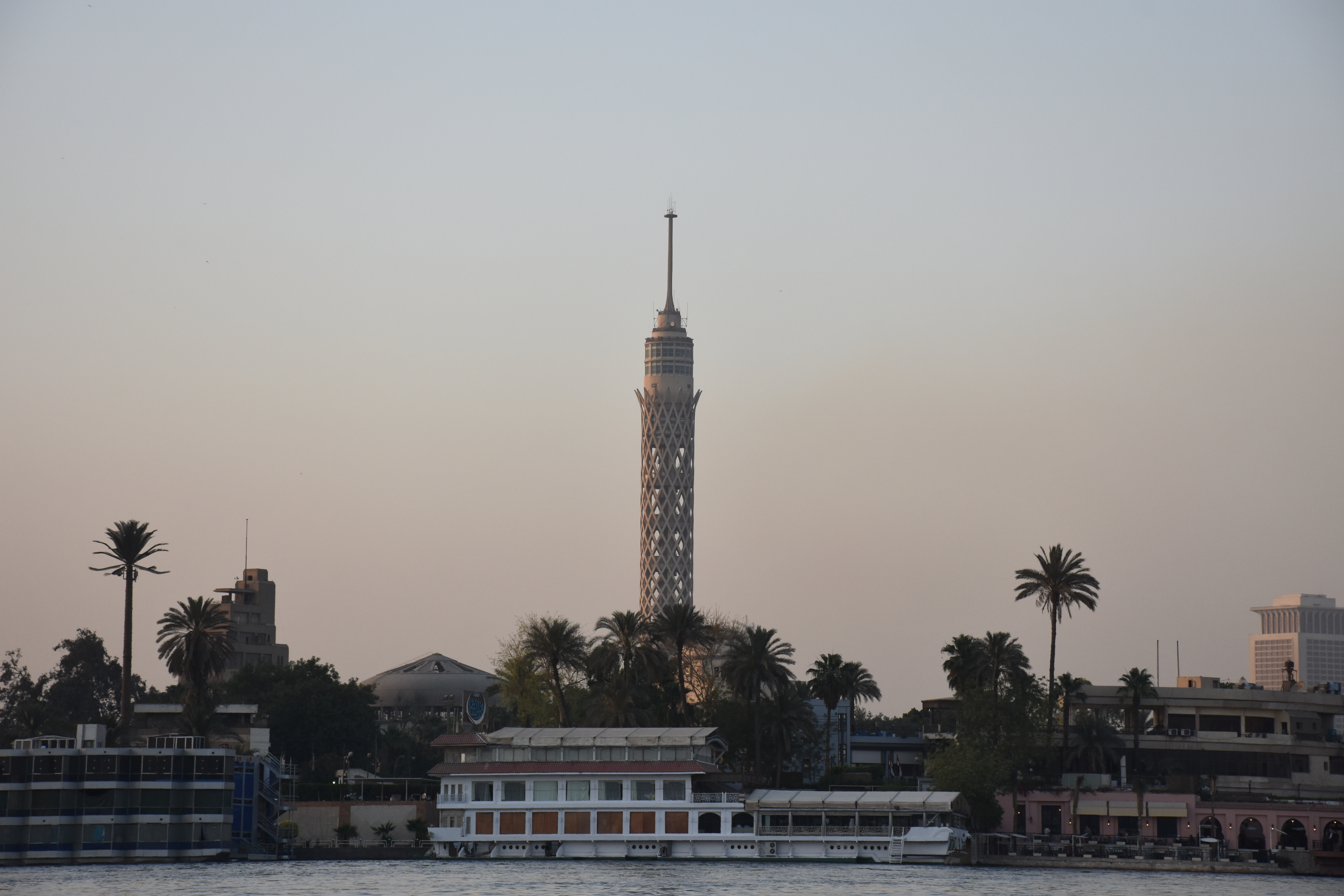
The Cairo Tower

Name	Image	Height m (ft)	Year	Structure Type	City	Notes
El-Mahalla El-Kubra TV Mast		323 m (1,060 ft)	N/D	Guyed Mast	El-Mahalla El-Kubra	Tallest structure in El-Mahalla El-Kubra and the tallest guyed mast in Egypt.
Pylons of Suez Canal Powerline Crossing		221 m (725 ft)	1998	Electricity Pylon	Suez	Tallest structure in Suez and the tallest transcontinental structure in the world.
Cairo Flagpole		202 m (663 ft)	2021	Flagpole	The New Capital	Tallest flagpole in the world.
Cairo Tower		187 m (614 ft)	1961	Concrete Tower	Cairo	Tallest structure in Cairo and the tallest concrete tower in Egypt.
Suez Canal Bridge		154 m (505 ft)	2001	Bridge Pylon	El Qantara	Tallest structure in El Qantara and the tallest bridge pylons in Egypt.
Egypt's Islamic Cultural Center		140 m (460 ft)	2023	Minaret	The New Capital	Tallest minarets in Egypt.
Great Pyramid of Giza		138.5 m (454 ft)	2570 BC	Pyramid	Giza	Tallest structure in Giza. Tallest structure in the world from 2570 BC to 1311 AD (3,881 years).
Pyramid of Khafre		136.4 m (448 ft)	2570 BC	Pyramid	Giza	
Al-Fath Mosque		130 m (430 ft)	1990	Minaret	Cairo	Tallest minaret in Egypt from 1990 to 2023.
Al-Nour Mosque	Game3_El_Nour	112 m (367 ft)	N/D	Minaret	Cairo	
Aswan Dam		111 m (364 ft)	1970	Dam	Aswan	Tallest structure in Aswan and the tallest dam in Egypt.
Red Pyramid		105 m (344 ft)	2575 BC	Pyramid	Dahshur	Tallest structure in Dahshur. Tallest structure in the world from 2575 BC to 2570 BC.
Bent Pyramid		104.7 m (344 ft)	2600 BC	Pyramid	Dahshur	Angle of slope decreased during construction to avoid collapse. Tallest structure in the world from 2600 BC to 2575 BC.

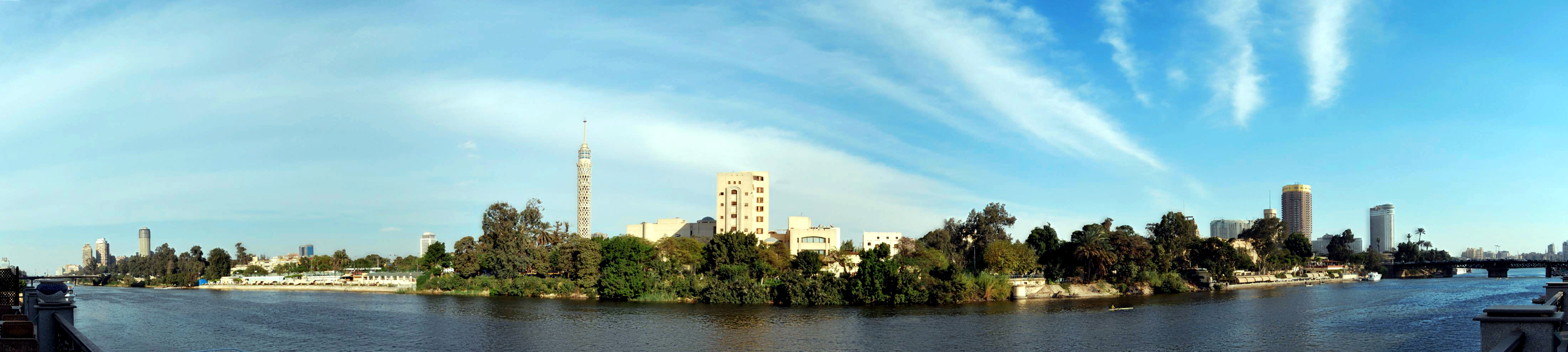
A panorama of the Nile showing Cairo Tower in the middle and two major bridges on the far right and left.
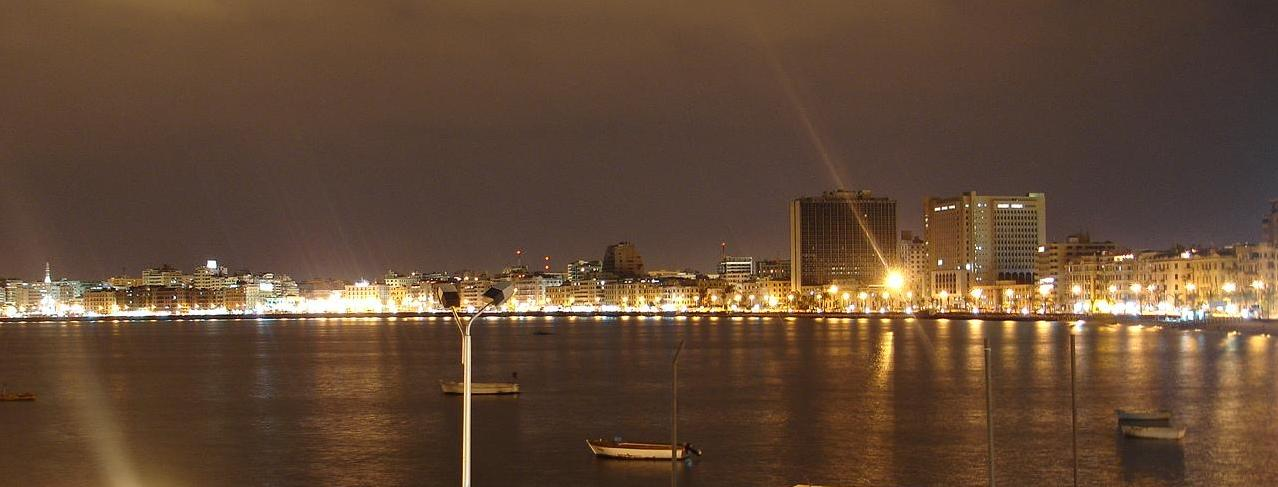
A wide angle shot of the Mediterranean coastline of Alexandria.

== Under construction ==
This section lists skyscrapers in Egypt that are under construction, and are planned to rise over 100 m (328 ft) tall. As of 2025, there are at least 20 skyscrapers currently under construction in Egypt that are planned to rise at least 100 m (328 ft) in height, with many more planned.

Name	Height	Floors	Estimated Completion	City	Notes
Capital Diamond Tower	260 m (850 ft)	66	2026	The New Capital	
Infinity Tower	250 m (820 ft)	50	2026	The New Capital	
Forbes International Tower	240 m (790 ft)	55	2030	The New Capital	
Nile Business City Northeast Tower	233 m (764 ft)	56	2026	The New Capital	
Nile Business City Northwest Tower	233 m (764 ft)	56	2026	The New Capital	
Tycoon Center	233 m (764 ft)	56	2026	The New Capital	
Tycoon Tower	233 m (764 ft)	56	2026	The New Capital	
Raville Tower & Residences	206 m (676 ft)	46	2027	New Cairo	
Orascom Tower A	200 m (660 ft)	45	TBA	New Alamein	
Orascom Tower B	200 m (660 ft)	45	TBA	New Alamein	
East Tower	185 m (607 ft)	47	2026	The New Capital	
6ixty Iconic Tower	180 m (590 ft)	45	2026	The New Capital	
Marina Alamein Tower 4	176 m (577 ft)	45	2026	New Alamein	
Marina Alamein Tower 5	176 m (577 ft)	45	2026	New Alamein	
Taj Tower	170 m (560 ft)	43	2027	The New Capital	
Marina Alamein Tower 2	168 m (551 ft)	42	2026	New Alamein	
Marina Alamein Tower 3	168 m (551 ft)	42	2026	New Alamein	
Levels Business Tower	153 m (502 ft)	36	2027	The New Capital	
Marina Alamein Tower 1	145 m (476 ft)	36	2026	New Alamein	
205 Tower 1	140 m (460 ft)	40	2029	Sheikh Zayed City	
205 Tower 2	140 m (460 ft)	40	2029	Sheikh Zayed City	
205 Tower 3	140 m (460 ft)	40	2029	Sheikh Zayed City	
31 North Tower	131 m (430 ft)	36	2027	The New Capital	
OIA Tower 1	111 m (364 ft)	30	2026	The New Capital	
OIA Tower 2	111 m (364 ft)	30	2026	The New Capital	
Moonreal Tower	111 m (364 ft)	25	2027	The New Capital	
Green River Tower	110 m (360 ft)	30	2027	The New Capital	
Podia Tower	110 m (360 ft)	26	2028	The New Capital	
Obsidier Tower 1	110 m (360 ft)	25	2026	The New Capital	
Obsidier Tower 2	110 m (360 ft)	25	2026	The New Capital	
Obsidier Tower 3	110 m (360 ft)	25	2026	The New Capital	
Quan Tower	100 m (330 ft)	25	2026	The New Capital	
Double Two Tower 1	100 m (330 ft)	23	2028	The New Capital	
Double Two Tower 2	100 m (330 ft)	23	2028	The New Capital	

== Approved or proposed ==
Building approved
Building proposed

This section lists skyscrapers in Egypt that are approved or proposed, and are planned to rise over 100 m (328 ft) tall.

Name	Height	Floors	Estimated Completion	City	Status	Notes
Oblisco Capitale	1,000 m (3,300 ft)	250	2030	The New Capital	Approved	
Father and Son Skyscraper	470 m (1,540 ft)	100+	TBA	Cairo	Proposed	
Nut Administrative Tower	380 m (1,250 ft)	80	TBA	The New Capital	Proposed	
Jirian City Tower 1	300+ m (984+ ft)	80	2029	6th of October	Approved	
Jirian City Tower 2	300+ m (984+ ft)	80	2029	6th of October	Approved	
Jirian City Tower 3	300+ m (984+ ft)	80	2029	6th of October	Approved	
Jirian City Tower 4	300+ m (984+ ft)	80	2029	6th of October	Approved	
Jirian City Tower 5	300+ m (984+ ft)	80	2029	6th of October	Approved	
Jirian City Tower 6	300+ m (984+ ft)	80	2029	6th of October	Approved	
Nile Tower	300 m (980 ft)	70	TBA	Cairo	Proposed	
Nut Residential Tower	270 m (890 ft)	62	TBA	The New Capital	Proposed	
Taj Tower 2	230 m (750 ft)	56	2030	The New Capital	Approved	
Eco Tower Cairo	220 m (720 ft)	70	TBA	Cairo	Proposed	
Zayed Spark Crystal	200 m (660 ft)	49	TBA	6th of October	Proposed	
Seaspark Twin Tower 1	200 m (660 ft)	45	TBA	New Alamein	Proposed	
Seaspark Twin Tower 2	200 m (660 ft)	45	TBA	New Alamein	Proposed	
North Coast Tower 1	200 m (660 ft)	43	2030	New Alamein	Approved	
North Coast Tower 2	200 m (660 ft)	43	2030	New Alamein	Approved	
Grand Nile Tower Expansion	167 m (548 ft)	12	TBA	Cairo	Proposed	
Fouda Tower Renovation	166 m (545 ft)	50	TBA	Cairo	Approved	

== Destroyed or cancelled ==
This list ranks skyscrapers and structures in Egypt over 100 m (328 ft) tall that were destroyed or cancelled.

Name	Height	Structure Type	Floors	City	Status	Notes
Shaza Cairo Nile	200 m (660 ft)	Skyscraper	50	Cairo	Cancelled	Would have been the tallest building in Cairo if built.
The St. Regis Cairo	180 m (590 ft)	Skyscraper	41	Cairo	Cancelled	Downsized to 139.5 m (458 ft) tall and 32 floors.
Peace Lighthouse	145 m (476 ft)	Monument	–	Alexandria	Cancelled	
Lighthouse of Alexandria	103 m (338 ft) - 118 m (387 ft)	Lighthouse	–	Alexandria	Destroyed	Tallest lighthouse in the world upon its completion in 280 BC. Destroyed by a series of earthquakes between 956 AD and 1303 AD.

== See also ==
- List of tallest structures in the world by country
- List of World Heritage Sites in Africa
- List of tallest buildings in Africa
