= National Youth Conference (Egypt) =

National Youth Conference المؤتمر الوطني للشباب
- Abbreviation: NYC
- Formation: 2016
- Headquarters: Egypt
- Official language: Arabic
- President: Abdel-Fattah El-Sisi
- Website: egyouth.com

The National Youth Conference (Arabic: المؤتمر الوطني للشباب) is a platform designed to facilitate direct dialogue between Egyptian youth and government officials. The event is held with the participation of Egypt’s President, Abdel Fattah El-Sisi.

== Background ==
The conference was initiated following a call by President Abdel Fattah El-Sisi to establish a national forum for youth engagement. This initiative was announced during the Egyptian Youth Day celebrations on January 9, 2016.

== Slogan ==
The recurring slogan of the conference across its various editions is "Innovate. Advance."

== Versions ==
=== The First Conference (October 2016 - Sharm El Sheikh) ===
==== Overview ====
The inaugural National Youth Conference took place in Sharm El Sheikh with the participation of Egyptian President Abdel Fattah El-Sisi. More than 3,000 young men and women from various governorates attended the event. The conference featured 487 speakers, including 330 young participants, and encompassed 120 working hours, with 83 workshops and sessions.

==== Recommendations ====
The conference resulted in several key recommendations, including:

- Establishing a national youth committee under the direct supervision of the Egyptian Presidency to assess the status of imprisoned youth who have not received judicial rulings.
- Coordinating efforts between the Egyptian Presidency, the Council of Ministers, and youth representatives to launch a national center for training and qualifying young leaders.
- Holding a monthly youth conference to follow up on the implementation of recommendations and decisions from the first National Youth Conference.
- Reviewing and studying potential amendments to the protest law in collaboration with relevant authorities.
- Organizing a comprehensive national dialogue on education reform within one month, engaging experts and specialists to propose innovative solutions.
- Encouraging youth participation in political programs and initiatives that promote volunteerism.
- Accelerating the issuance of media legislation and finalizing the formation of regulatory bodies overseeing journalism and media activities.
- Collaborating with Al-Azhar, the Egyptian Church, and state institutions to foster community dialogue aimed at strengthening values, ethics, and religious discourse.

=== The First Regular Conference (December 2016 - Cairo) ===
==== Overview ====
The first periodical National Youth Conference was held under the participation of President of Egypt Abdel Fattah El-Sisi, in Al-Masa Hotel in Cairo, with the participation of more than 1000 young men and women, The Conference held 29 speakers including 15 young people, 10 working hours including 6 workshops and sessions.

==== Recommendations ====
- Conducting a study on the demonstration law that was approved April 2016.
- President of Egypt Abdel-Fattah El-Sisi mandated the government to submit a request to the House of Representatives to re-discuss the civil associations law in line with the nature of their work.
- The continuation of the work of formed committees to study the cases of youth in custody.
- Supporting volunteer initiatives and community dialogue to examine education and religious dialogue issues.

=== The Second Regular Conference (January 2017 - Aswan) ===
==== Overview ====
The second periodic National Youth Conference was held in Aswan with the participation of Egyptian President Abdel Fattah El-Sisi. The event brought together over 1,300 young men and women, alongside more than 23 ministers, members of parliament, governors from Upper Egypt, and university presidents. The conference featured 48 speakers, including 25 young participants, and covered 20 working hours, incorporating 11 workshops and sessions.

==== Recommendations ====
Key recommendations from the conference included:

- Establishing the Supreme Commission for the Development of Upper Egypt, focusing on improving public services, creating job opportunities, and preserving Nubian heritage, with an investment plan of LE 5 billion over five years.
- Completing all development projects in Nasr Nubia and Wadi Karkar, with an allocation of LE 320 million to finalize these projects by June 2018.
- Launching a national project for integrated industrial zones targeting small and micro industries, starting with 200 small factories in each Upper Egyptian governorate within six months.
- Expanding social protection programs, such as Takafol wi Karama, by introducing initiatives that support children of beneficiary families and creating labor-intensive projects.
- Enhancing quality of life in Upper Egypt by focusing on healthcare, education, transportation, and housing improvements.
- Accelerating the Golden Triangle Project encompassing Qena, Safaga, and Qusseir to develop mining and tourism hubs, transforming the region into a global investment destination.
- Positioning Aswan as Africa’s economic and cultural capital, and organizing a major celebration to mark the 200th anniversary of the discovery of Abu Simbel Temple, aiming to boost tourism.
- Excluding Khor Qandi (12,000 feddans) from the Reef El-Masry project to develop an integrated vision for the area within three months.
- Reviewing compensation claims for individuals affected by the construction of the High Dam, through a national committee that would conclude its work within six months.

=== The Third Regular Conference (April 2017 - Ismailia) ===
==== Overview ====
The third periodic National Youth Conference took place in Ismailia, Sinai, with President Abdel Fattah El-Sisi in attendance. The conference welcomed over 1,200 young participants and featured 34 speakers, including 17 youth representatives. The event lasted 11 working hours and included six workshops and sessions.

==== Recommendations ====
The key recommendations from this conference included:

- Declaring 2018 as the "Year of the Disabled" to promote awareness and support for persons with disabilities.
- Establishing internal audit teams composed of young professionals within state institutions and agencies.
- Launching an initiative to enhance public spaces, including beautifying squares and streets, while also streamlining the process for youth-led businesses to obtain operational licenses.
- Forming a monitoring and follow-up team from the Administrative Control Authority’s youth members, who previously presented an economic simulation, along with a group from the Presidential Leadership Program, to track the implementation of conference recommendations.
- Reviewing and enhancing the Investment Council’s structure, with recommendations submitted to the Supreme Council for Investment and Export.
- Implementing measures to integrate the informal economy under the guidance of the Supreme Council of Payments.
- Automating financial systems such as customs and taxes to improve transparency and reduce financial losses.
- Initiating the process for establishing a Supreme Council of Databases, under the direct leadership of the President of Egypt, to streamline data management and governance.

=== The Fourth Regular Conference (July 2017 - Alexandria) ===
==== Overview ====
The fourth periodic National Youth Conference took place at the Bibliotheca Alexandrina in Alexandria, with President Abdel Fattah El-Sisi in attendance. The event brought together 1,500 young participants from across the West Delta region, including 1,300 youth from Alexandria, Matrouh, Beheira, and Kafr El-Sheikh governorates. Attendees included university students, participants who registered through the conference website, members of the Presidential Program for Youth Leadership Qualification, representatives from business associations, political party youth, and individuals engaged in NGOs and volunteer work.

==== Recommendations ====
The conference resulted in several recommendations, including:

- Providing full state support for the World Youth Forum, an initiative led by Egyptian youth, and extending invitations to international leaders and youth to foster global dialogue on peace and unity.
- Directing the government to establish a monitoring mechanism for Egypt’s 2030 Strategy, ensuring periodic evaluation through youth-empowered models.
- Expanding urban development in Alexandria governorate by 18,000 acres and improving local transportation networks.
- Completing the Bashaer Al-Kheir slum redevelopment project, delivering 7,500 new housing units.
- Beginning the restoration and development of Rosetta’s archaeological sites.
- Advancing industrial zone projects in Beheira governorate across 10,000 acres and opening them for investment.
- Establishing an agricultural stock exchange on 57 acres in Wadi Al-Natroun’s Al-Tahrir directorate.
- Conducting feasibility studies for the Western Egypt Development Project and initiating its implementation.
- Allocating 10,000 acres in Metobas, Kafr Al-Sheikh for investment, creating job opportunities for youth.
- Forming a joint committee from the Ministries of Defense, Housing, and Local Development to assess building height restrictions and explore alternative construction zones in desert areas.
- Addressing grievances and demands from residents of the West Delta governorates.
- Developing an integrated plan for a cultural hub in the New Administrative Capital and New Alamein City.
- Finalizing the new administrative division of Egypt’s governorates, including adding desert areas to Upper Egypt’s governorates, extending borders to the Red Sea, and adjusting regional boundaries to enhance development and social justice.

=== The Fifth Regular Conference (May 2018 - Cairo) ===
The fifth periodic National Youth Conference was held at Al-Masa Hotel in Cairo, with President Abdel Fattah El-Sisi engaging directly with youth participants. Discussions focused on Egypt’s future over the next four years, as well as the role of youth in the country’s political landscape. One of the conference’s most significant segments was the “Ask the President” session, where the President responded to pressing public concerns and key national issues.

==== Recommendations ====
Key outcomes from the conference included:

- Launching the Political Cadre School, under the National Training Academy, to cultivate young political leaders.
- Establishing a Public Policy National Conference to discuss political challenges and create a communication framework between political parties and executive authorities for problem-solving.
- Amending political party laws to strengthen national identity and encourage civic participation in coordination with relevant institutions and civil society.
- Developing a comprehensive strategy on civil liberties and public opinion, with the formation of the National Youth Council to oversee relevant policy decisions.
- Reaffirming the state’s full support for the World Youth Forum and assigning the government to integrate youth leaders into the monitoring and implementation process of Egypt’s 2030 Strategy.
