= Abbud =

Abbud is both a surname and a given name. Notable people with the name include:

- Karimeh Abbud (1893–1940), Palestinian photographer and artist
- Aboud El Zomor (born 1948), Egyptian military officer and Islamist
- Abbud Pasha (1899–1963), Egyptian entrepreneur and businessman
