= Fouda Tower =

Unfinished skyscraper in Zamalek, Cairo, Egypt

- برج فودة
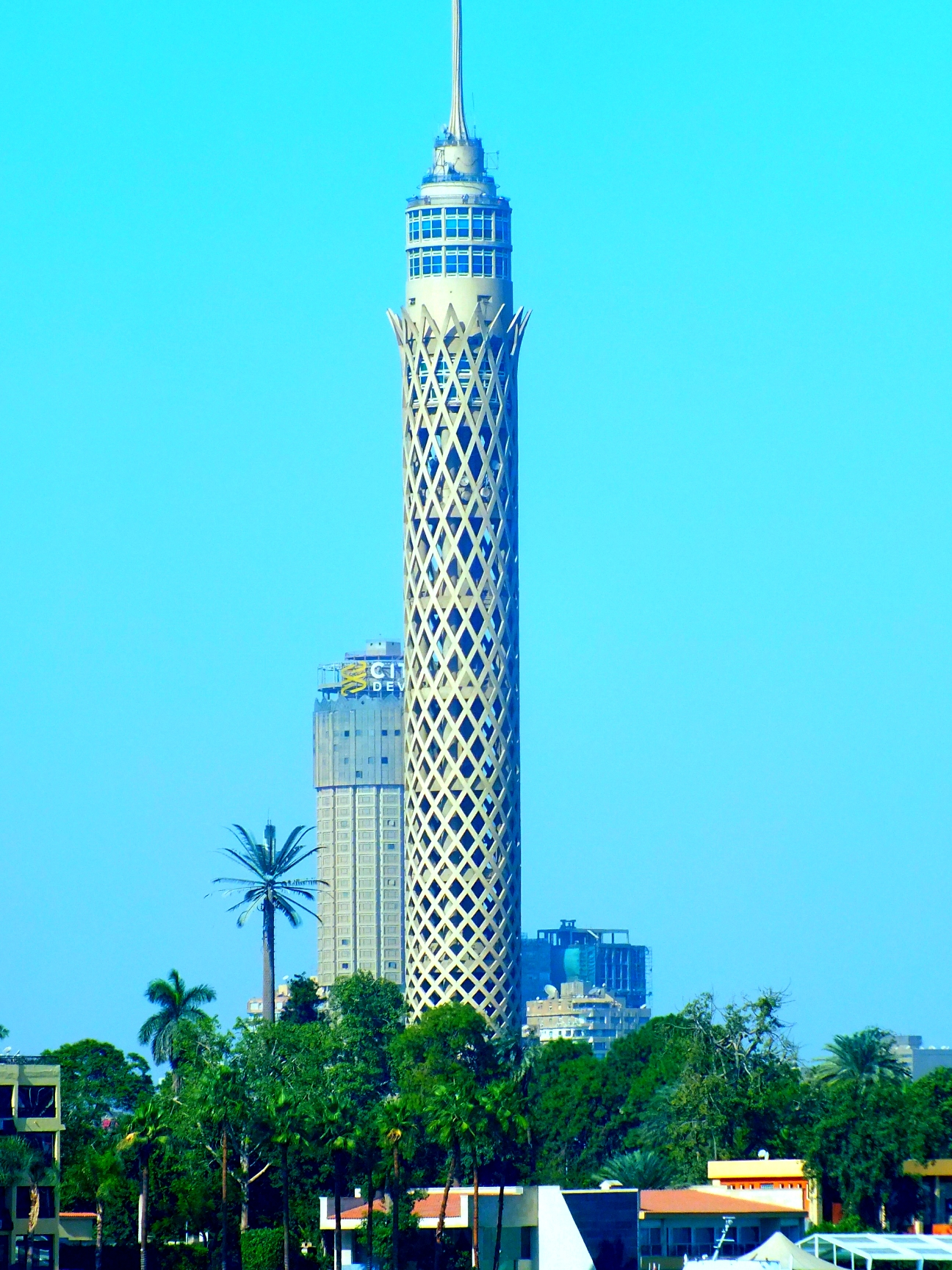
- Fouda Tower as seen from behind the Cairo Tower in February 2020
- Alternative names: Zamalek Tower, Gezira Tower and Hotel, Tower of Shame

General information
- Status: Under redevelopment
- Type: Mixed-use
- Architectural style: Modern
- Location: Zamalek, Cairo, Egypt
- Coordinates: 30°03′20.7″N 31°13′11.7″E
- Construction started: 1972
- Construction stopped: 1989
- Completed: Unknown

Height
- Roof: 166 m (545 ft)

Technical details
- Floor count: 50

Design and construction
- Developer: Khaled Fouda

Other information
- Number of rooms: 450

Fouda Tower (Arabic: برج فودة), also known as Zamalek Tower, is an unfinished skyscraper located in the Zamalek district of Cairo, Egypt. Standing at 166 m (545 ft) tall with 50 floors, it is currently the tallest building in Cairo and the second-tallest freestanding structure in the city, surpassed only by the 187 m (614 ft) Cairo Tower. It is also the eighth-tallest building in Egypt and the tallest in the country outside of The New Capital and New Alamein.

Originally planned as a 450-room luxury hotel, construction on the skyscraper began in 1972. However, work on the building was halted in the 1980s, primarily due to an ongoing series of bureaucratic obstacles, permit disputes, building code violations, and lawsuits following the assassination of Anwar Sadat in 1981. The project was never completed or inaugurated and remained abandoned for decades, largely because it lacked a private parking garage.

In February 2025, the Morshedy Group acquired the tower from a state-owned bank for EGP 2.5 billion. The developer subsequently announced plans to convert the 50-story skyscraper into a luxury mixed-use residential and hotel complex. As of 2026, the building is undergoing redevelopment, with an estimated completion date remaining unannounced.

== History ==
The skyscraper was envisioned in the early 1970s by Egyptian developer Khaled Fouda as a 450-room luxury hotel and formed part of a broader New Manhattan development concept on Zamalek intended to symbolize modern Cairo. Construction began in 1972 with official permits, though the design lacked provisions for an internal parking garage. Before work was halted, the building topped out at its full height of 166 m (545 ft), making it the tallest building overall in Egypt until the completion of the Iconic Tower in The New Capital in 2024.

Following the assassination of Anwar Sadat in 1981, the project lost political momentum, and construction was completely halted between 1989 and 1990 due to building code violations, unlicensed floors, and the unresolved lack of a parking facility. In 2003, the Cairo Governorate formally halted and abandoned the project, as municipal authorities cited the absence of a private parking garage as a critical issue given the high traffic density of Zamalek. Over subsequent decades, several compromise solutions were proposed, including constructing an underground garage beneath the Gezira Sporting Club, converting nearby villas into parking spaces, or integrating a police station into the complex, all of which were rejected by authorities.

The unfinished structure became locally known as Cairo's first skyscraper as well as the Tower of Shame on the city's skyline. It has since been featured in documentaries and journalistic accounts as a symbol of stalled modernist aspirations.

In February 2025, the Morshedy Group acquired the tower from a state-owned bank in a deal valued at EGP 2.5 billion. The developer announced plans to redevelop the structure into a high-end mixed-use residential and hospitality complex, with parking on an adjoining 4,000 m² plot. While detailed plans remain under development, the acquisition was widely reported as a potential revival of the long-abandoned landmark.

== Gallery ==
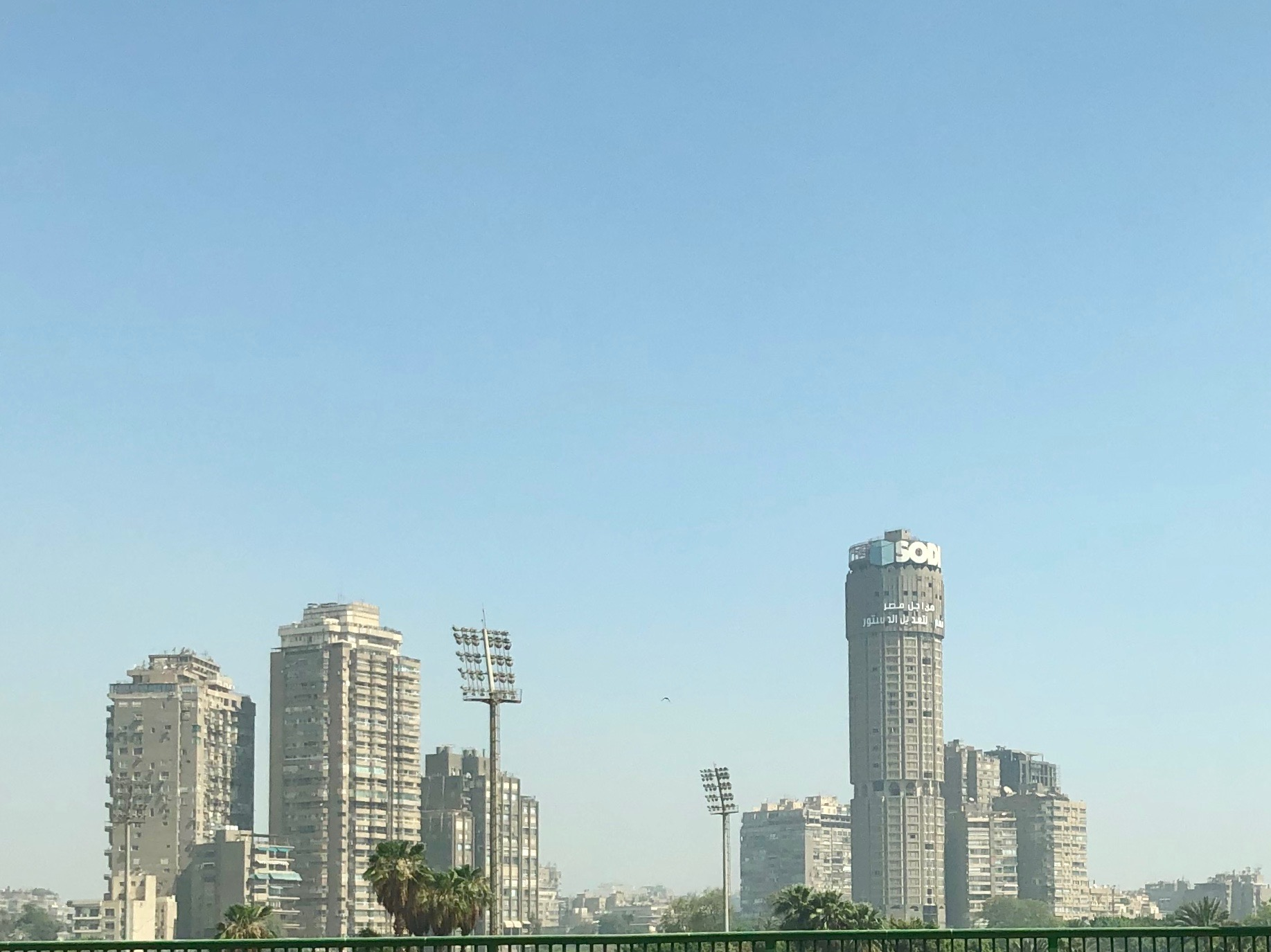

== See also ==
- List of tallest buildings and structures in Egypt
- List of tallest buildings in Africa
