= List of tallest buildings in New Alamein =

This list ranks all completed or under construction buildings in the Mediterranean city of New Alamein by their height.

== Completed and under construction ==
Name	Usage	Height m (ft)	Floors	Started	Construction Status	Total Area	Developer	Notes	References
Alamein Iconic Tower	Residential	291.8 m (957 ft)	67	2021	Topped Out	402,600 m^{2} (4,333,550 sq ft)	NUCA	New Alamein's tallest building and Africa's tallest residential building.	
Alamein Downtown Towers D01 Tower 1	Residential	207.8 m (682 ft)	56	2021	Topped Out	160,000 m^{2} (1,722,226 sq ft)	NUCA		
Alamein Downtown Towers D01 Tower 2	Residential	207.8 m (682 ft)	56	2021	Topped Out	160,000 m^{2} (1,722,226 sq ft)	NUCA		
Alamein Downtown Towers D01 Tower 3	Residential	207.8 m (682 ft)	56	2021	Topped Out	160,000 m^{2} (1,722,226 sq ft)	NUCA		
Alamein Downtown Towers D01 Tower 4	Residential	207.8 m (682 ft)	56	2021	Topped Out	160,000 m^{2} (1,722,226 sq ft)	NUCA		
Orascom Tower A	Mixed-use	200 m (656 ft)	45	2021	Under Construction		NUCA		
Orascom Tower B	Mixed-use	200 m (656 ft)	45	2021	Under Construction		NUCA		
Gate Towers East	Residential	170 m (558 ft)	44	2019	Topped Out	318,000 m^{2} (3,422,924 sq ft)	City Edge Developments		
Gate Towers West	Residential	170 m (558 ft)	44	2019	Topped Out	258,000 m^{2} (2,777,089 sq ft)	City Edge Developments		
North Edge Tower A	Residential	~160 m (525 ft)	42	2019	Topped Out	81,600 m^{2} (878,335 sq ft)	City Edge Developments		
North Edge Tower B	Residential	~160 m (525 ft)	42	2019	Topped Out	81,600 m^{2} (878,335 sq ft)	City Edge Developments		
North Edge Tower C	Residential	~160 m (525 ft)	42	2019	Topped Out	80,500 m^{2} (866,495 sq ft)	City Edge Developments		
North Edge Tower D	Residential	~160 m (525 ft)	42	2019	Topped Out	80,500 m^{2} (866,495 sq ft)	City Edge Developments		
North Edge Tower E	Residential	~160 m (525 ft)	42	2019	Topped Out	80,500 m^{2} (866,495 sq ft)	City Edge Developments		
LD04 Tower A	Residential	~160 m (525 ft)	42	2021	Topped Out	81,000 m^{2} (871,877 sq ft)	City Edge Developments		
LD04 Tower B	Residential	~160 m (525 ft)	42	2021	Topped Out	81,000 m^{2} (871,877 sq ft)	City Edge Developments		
LD04 Tower C	Residential	~160 m (525 ft)	42	2021	Topped Out	81,000 m^{2} (871,877 sq ft)	City Edge Developments		
Marina Tower A	Mixed-use	150 m (492 ft)	40	2021	Under Construction	85,000 m^{2} (914,932 sq ft)	NUCA		
Marina Tower B	Mixed-use	150 m (492 ft)	40	2021	Under Construction	85,000 m^{2} (914,932 sq ft)	NUCA		
Marina Tower C	Mixed-use	150 m (492 ft)	40	2021	Under Construction	85,000 m^{2} (914,932 sq ft)	NUCA		
LD00 Tower A1	Mixed-use		39	2019	Topped Out	85,000 m^{2} (914,932 sq ft)	NUCA		
LD00 Tower C1	Mixed-use		38	2019	Topped Out	85,000 m^{2} (914,932 sq ft)	NUCA		
LD01 Tower A2	Mixed-use		38	2019	Topped Out	75,000 m^{2} (807,293 sq ft)	NUCA		
LD00 Tower B1	Mixed-use		35	2019	Topped Out	77,000 m^{2} (828,821 sq ft)	NUCA		
LD00 Tower D1	Mixed-use		34	2019	Topped Out	70,000 m^{2} (753,474 sq ft)	NUCA		
LD01 Tower B2	Mixed-use		34	2019	Topped Out	70,000 m^{2} (753,474 sq ft)	NUCA		
LD01 Tower C2	Mixed-use		31	2019	Topped Out	65,000 m^{2} (699,654 sq ft)	NUCA		
LD01 Tower D2	Mixed-use		27	2019	Topped out	50,000 m^{2} (538,196 sq ft)	NUCA		
Al Masa Tower 1	Mixed-use	103 m (338 ft)	24	2019	Completed	28,000 m^{2} (301,389 sq ft)	NUCA		
Al Masa Tower 2	Mixed-use	103 m (338 ft)	24	2019	Completed	28,000 m^{2} (301,389 sq ft)	NUCA		
Al Masa Tower 3	Mixed-use	103 m (338 ft)	24	2019	Completed	31,500 m^{2} (339,063 sq ft)	NUCA		
Al Masa Tower 4	Mixed-use	103 m (338 ft)	24	2019	Completed	31,500 m^{2} (339,063 sq ft)	NUCA		
Al Masa Tower 5	Mixed-use	103 m (338 ft)	24	2019	Completed	31,500 m^{2} (339,063 sq ft)	NUCA		
Al Masa Tower 6	Mixed-use	103 m (338 ft)	24	2019	Completed	31,500 m^{2} (339,063 sq ft)	NUCA		

== Proposed ==
Name	Usage	Height m (ft)	Floors	Started	Construction Status	Total Area	Developer	Notes
Blue Up and Down Tourist Tower	Tourism	550 m (1,804 ft)		N/A	Proposed			
Blue Up and Down Residential Tower	Residential	380 m (1,247 ft)		N/A	Proposed			
Blue Up and Down Business Tower	Commercial	260 m (853 ft)		N/A	Proposed			
Seaspark Twin Tower 1	Mixed-use	200 m (656 ft)	45	N/A	Proposed			Designed by CUBE Consultants.
Seaspark Twin Tower 2	Mixed-use	200 m (656 ft)	45	N/A	Proposed			Designed by CUBE Consultants.
