= William Selim Hanna =

Egyptian engineer

William Selim Hanna (1896–1980), born in Assiut, Egypt وليم سليم حنا, was an Egyptian Minister of Housing. A prominent structural engineer, Hanna completed his education in Alexandria and Cairo and graduated from the Faculty of Engineering of Cairo University in 1920 with an engineering diploma. He then traveled to England and joined the University of Birmingham, where he earned a bachelor's degree with first place honors in Civil Engineering in 1923. He studied for a doctorate in the same university and received his PhD in 1926.

== Positions held ==
After getting his PhD, he returned to Egypt for the post of Lecturer at the Department of Structural Engineering, Faculty of Engineering, Cairo University, in 1926 .

When the Research Laboratory of Concrete was created at the Faculty of Engineering in Cairo University in 1932 with the support of Cebu Tariv, an engineering professor at Princeton University, Hanna became its director.

In 1933 he was appointed Director of the Research Laboratory for Mechanics and Foundations Education. In 1937 he took the post of assistant professor in the faculty.

In 1941 he took the post of professor of reinforced concrete for the construction of buildings and continued to hold this post until 1952. In 1952 he was appointed Minister of Municipal and Rural Affairs, a post he held until 1954.

After this post, Hanna worked as a consultant in his own office, in addition to serving as a full-time professor at the Faculty of Engineering of Cairo University. Later in 1954 he was chosen to be a member of the board of Ain Shams University.

== Projects ==
- contributed to the construction of Qasr al-Nil bridge, which opened in 1935
- The Nile Hilton Hotel
- Ramses Hilton Hotel
- Many industrial buildings and some well-known presses
- Power plants
- Hanna was also the first to envision the construction of a subway for Egypt
- Involved with the saving of the Philae Monuments after a global appeal directed by UNESCO in 1966
