= Bank Misr Building =

Skyscraper in Cairo, Egypt

- Interactive map of the Bank Misr Building area

General information
- Status: Completed
- Type: Commercial
- Location: Cairo, Egypt
- Coordinates: 30°02′54.1″N 31°14′41.4″E
- Completed: 1985

Height
- Roof: 427 ft (130 m)

Technical details
- Floor count: 29

Bank Misr Building is a skyscraper in Cairo, Egypt. Completed in 1985, the 29-story building serves as the headquarters for Bank Misr and held the title of the tallest building in Egypt for one year, until it was surpassed by the National Bank of Egypt Towers.

== See also ==
- List of tallest buildings and structures in Egypt
- List of tallest buildings in Africa
