= Sofitel Cairo Nile El Gezirah Hotel =

Skyscraper hotel in Cairo, Egypt

- سوفيتيل القاهرة النيل الجزيرة
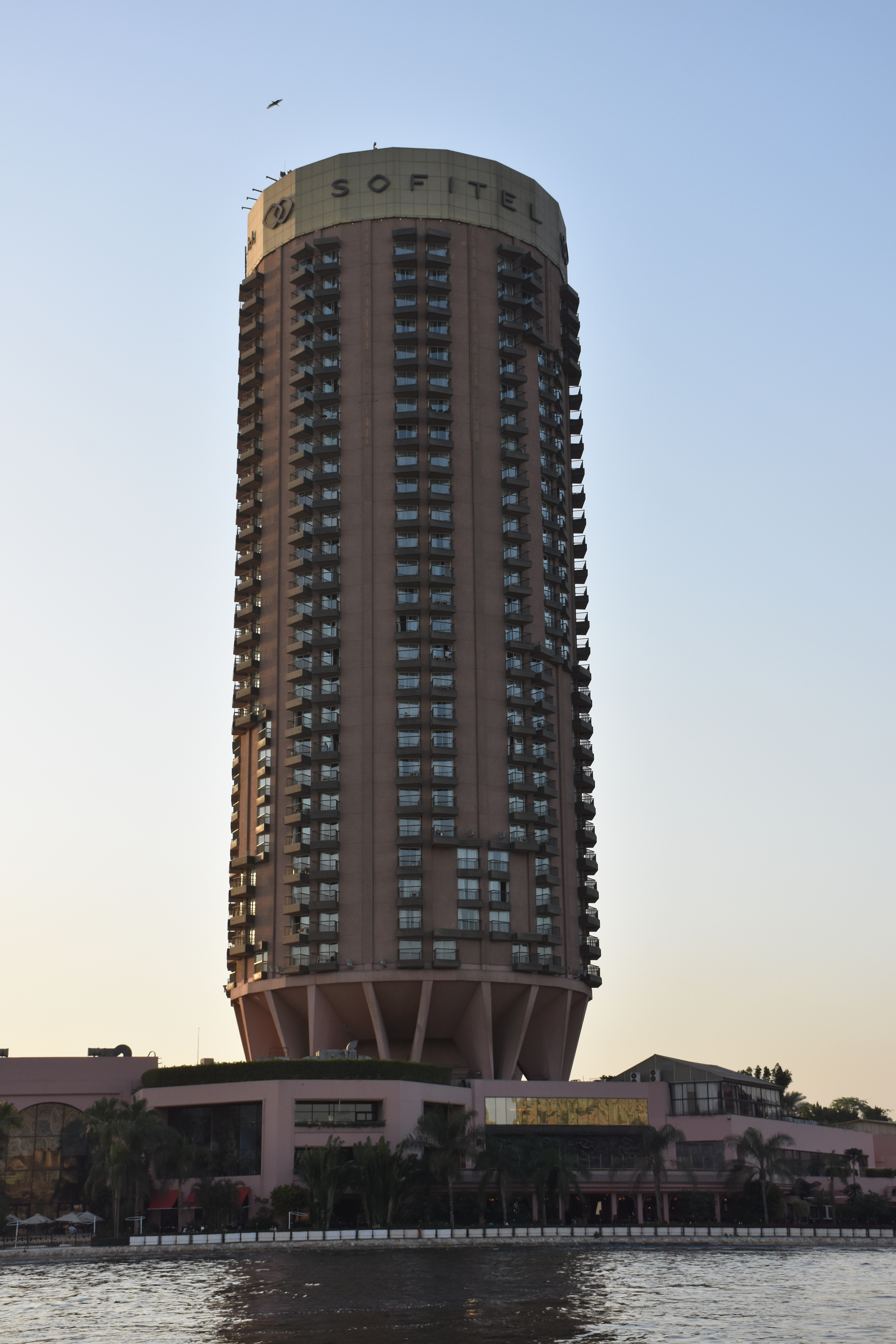
- Interactive map of the Sofitel Cairo Nile El Gezirah Hotel area

General information
- Status: Completed
- Type: Hotel
- Location: Cairo, Egypt
- Coordinates: 30°02′19.2″N 31°13′28.5″E
- Completed: 1984
- Opening: 1984

Height
- Roof: 328 ft (100 m)

Technical details
- Floor count: 27

Design and construction
- Architect: Ragheb Ayad

The Sofitel Cairo Nile El Gezirah Hotel is a skyscraper hotel located in the Zamalek district of Cairo, Egypt. The modernist skyscraper is situated on Sharia el Orman and contains four large conference rooms. The discernible V-shaped support beams of the building evoke those at the Dizengoff Center in Tel Aviv, Israel.

Completed in 1984, the 27-story building originally opened as the El Gezira Sheraton Hotel, operating as part of the Sheraton chain. The hotel closed in 2006 for extensive refurbishments and reopened one year later as part of the Accor Sofitel chain under its current name.

== Gallery ==
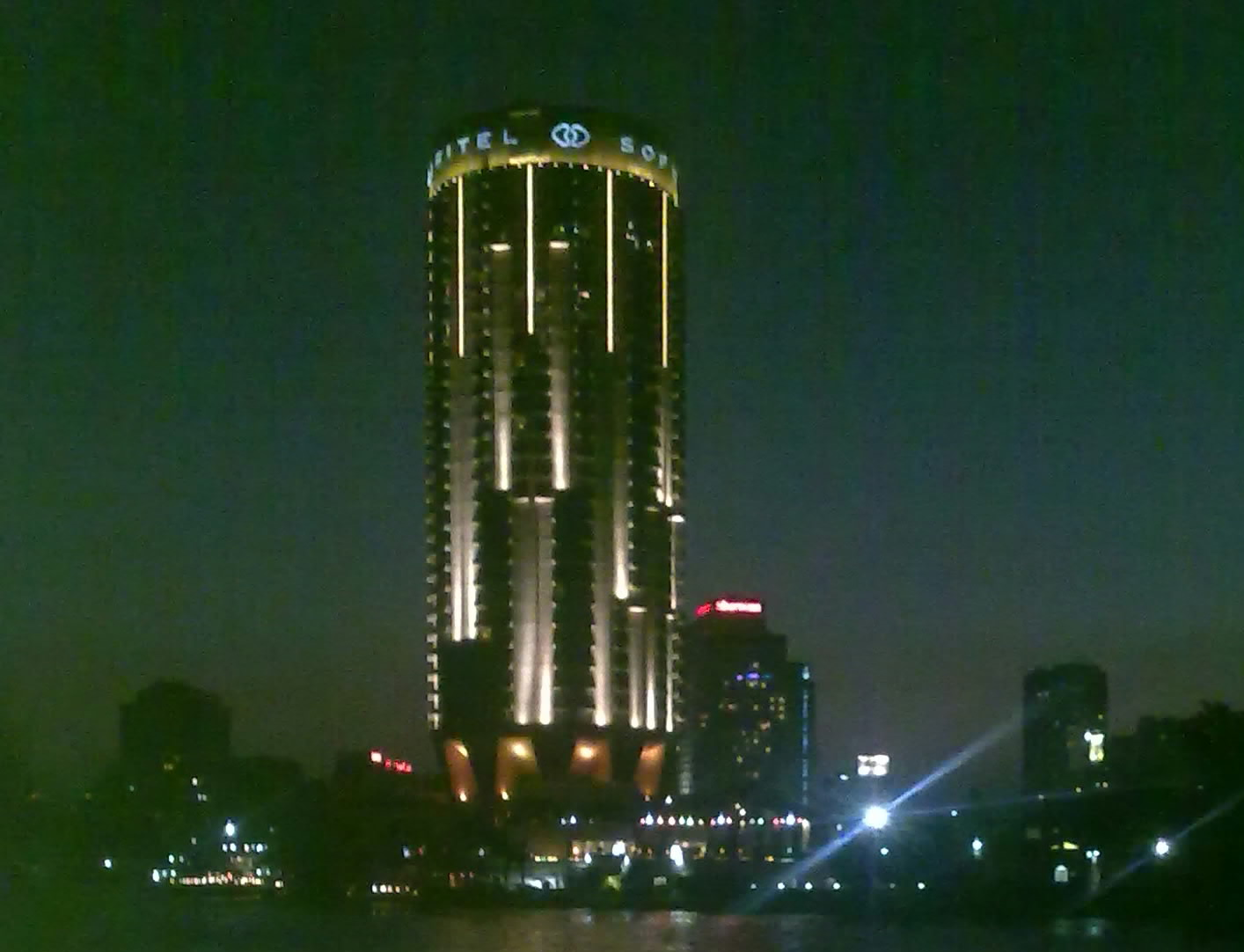
Sofitel Cairo Nile El Gezirah Hotel at night

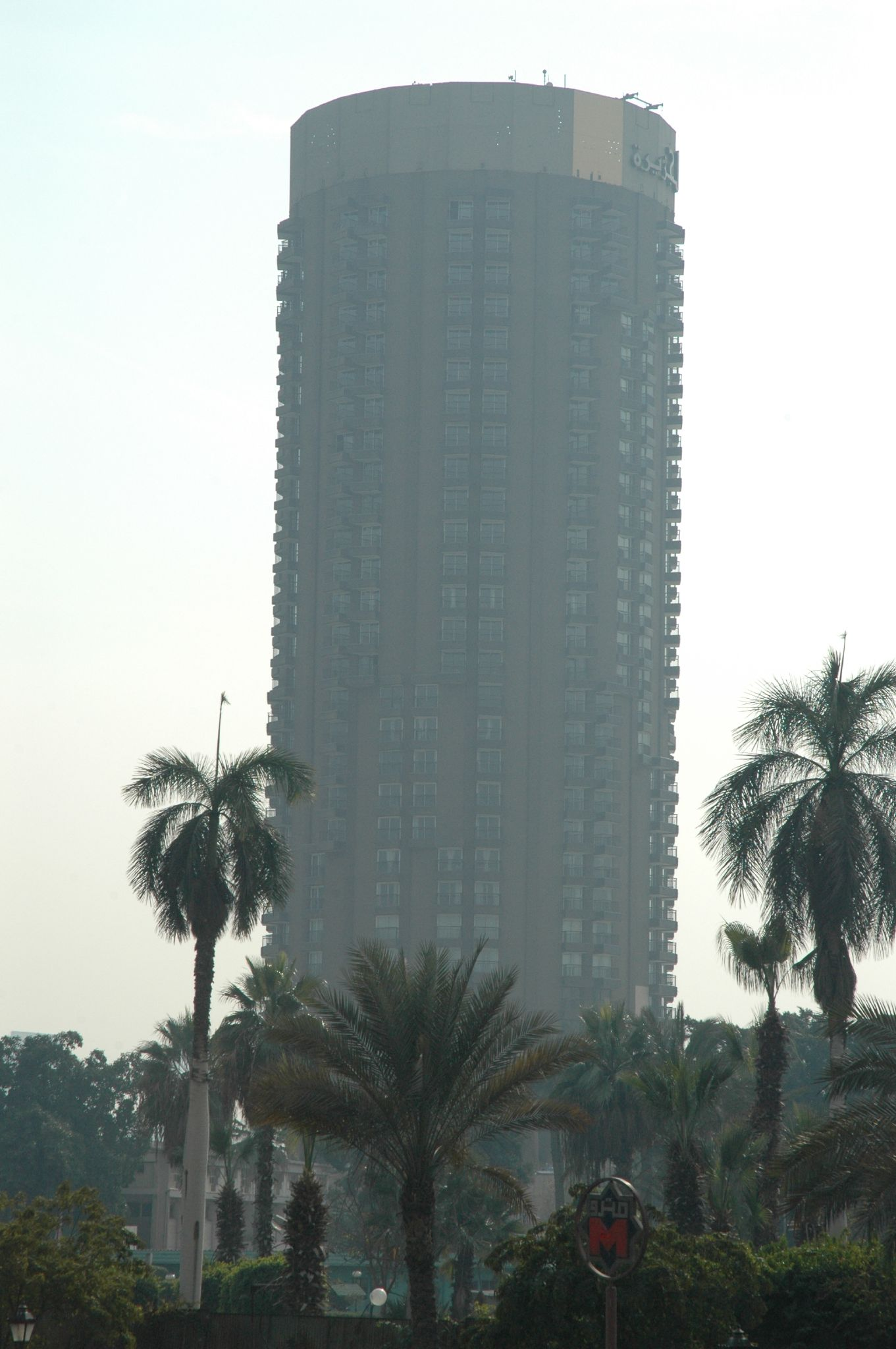
Sofitel Cairo Nile El Gezirah Hotel under restoration in January 2007, just months before its opening

== See also ==
- List of tallest buildings and structures in Egypt
