= Naoum Shebib =

Egyptian architect

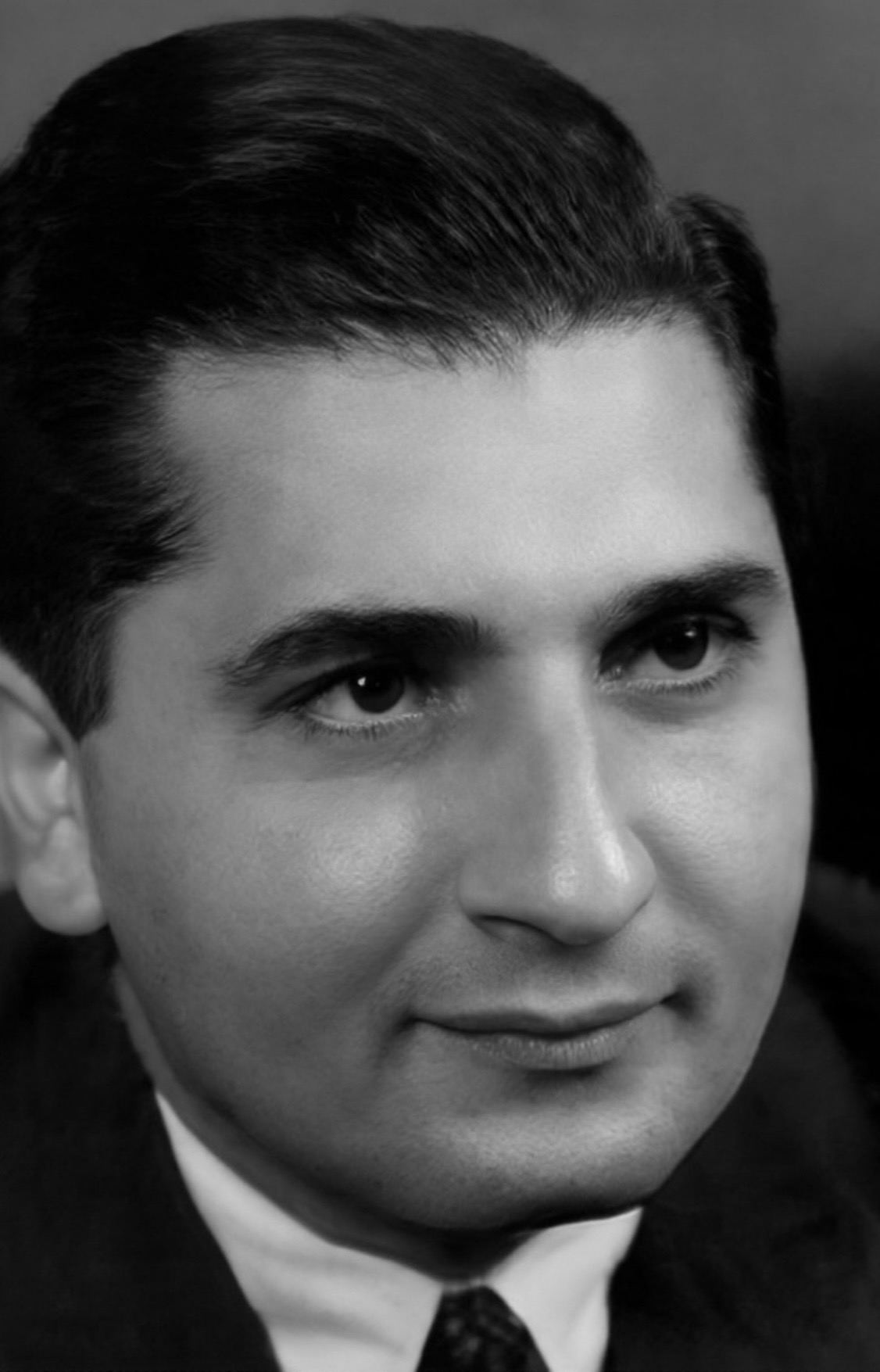
- Born: 1915; Egypt
- Died: 1985
- Education: Cairo University
- Occupation: Architect
- Buildings: Cairo Tower
- Website: naoumshebib.com

Naoum Shebib (1915–1985), (or Naoum Chebib, نعوم شبيب) was an Egyptian architect. He is considered one of the 'pioneer Egyptian architects' and a practitioner of Modernist architecture in Egypt. He was also a structural engineer and entrepreneur. His most famous work is the Cairo Tower, which is the tallest structure in Egypt and North Africa, rising 187 meters.

== Early life and biography ==
Born in Cairo, on 28 November 1915, Naoum Shebib was one of the leading Egyptian architects of his time. He studied architectural engineering in Cairo University, and graduated in 1937 with honors. He also obtained from the same university a post graduate diploma in Soil Mechanics & Engineering (1954) and another in Structural Engineering (1956). Between 1941 and 1970, Shebib conducted his practice as an architect, structural engineer and contractor. In 1971, Naoum Shebib relocated to Canada with his family, where he lived until his death in 1985.

== Most notable projects ==
- Ali Baba Movie Theater, 1946, Boulaq, Cairo.
- Saint Thérèse Church, 1948, Port-Said.
- Saint Catherine's Church, 1950, Heliopolis.
- Cairo Tower, 1961, Cairo.
- Thabet-Thabet (Belmont Building), 1958, Garden City, Cairo.
- Al-Ahram Building, 1968, Cairo.
- Radio Tower, 1954.

== Cairo Tower ==
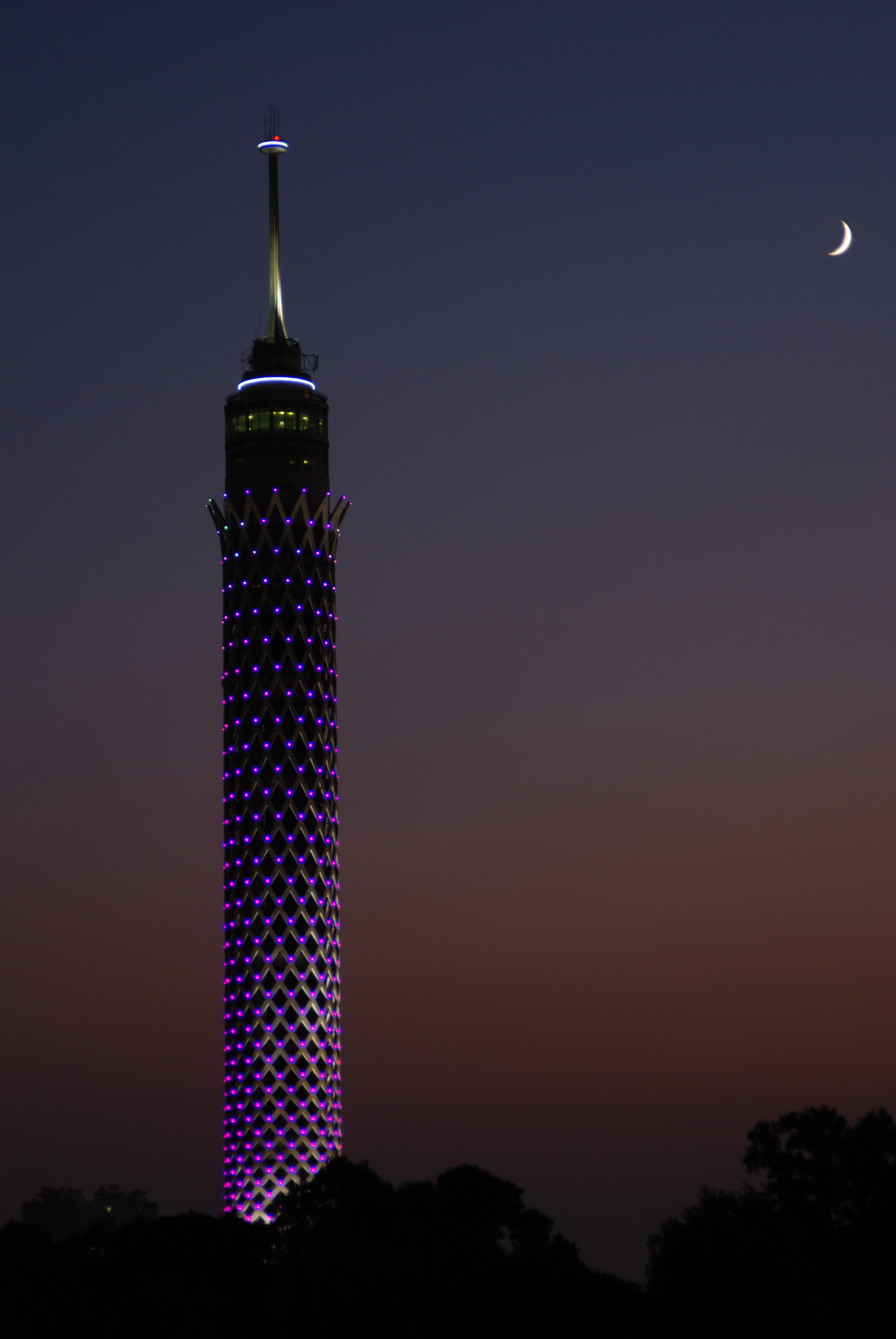
The Cairo Tower by Naoum Shebib

The Cairo Tower on Gezira Island, was the highest concrete structure in the world when it was completed, standing 187 meters tall. Shebib was the project's architect in chief, structural engineer and its global contractor. In 1961 the tower's official inauguration took place. The design of the tower is of Pharaonic influence appearing in the shape of a tall lotus flower made up of 8 million small mosaic lozenges. As the lozenges ascend towards the top of the tower, they are stretched on a vertical axis creating an impression of an upward movement enhancing the figure of the lotus flower. With a diameter of fourteen meters, the tower rests on a steel-reinforced concrete slab, the dimension of which is quite impressive. At the time of its construction, more than five hundred workers were required. The Cairo Tower is also characterized by purity of lines and by the truthfulness of primal material. The absence of any superfluous decorations and the utilization of the naked concrete bring the viewer's eyes and attention to yet another symbol of eternal Egypt. At the top of the tower, one finds a revolving restaurant, a cafeteria and a belvedere from which numerous tourists can admire the Cairo panorama.

== Al-Ahram Building (1968) ==
The Al-Ahram Bldg. is the home of Al-Ahram, the leading Arab newspaper. Here also Shebib was the project's architect in chief, structural and site engineer. The surface of this building is 30,000 square meters which includes space occupied by the editorial, printing and administration services, as well as the public areas.

== Dome roofs ==
In 1946, Shebib built the concrete dome roof of the 800 sq.m. Ali Baba Cinema, in the Boulaq district, using a technology that he subsequently patented. It consisted of a unique method whereby the concrete roof of a building is poured onto a mould on the ground and, once the concrete has set, is slowly raised into position to a height of 12 meters with the use of jacks. A similar dome roof, supported by only eight pillars, was used in the construction of De Soto's Sales & Service Bldg for the Cairo Motor Company.

== Other projects ==
Shebib was also involved in several construction projects including apartment buildings, schools, churches, factories, commercial buildings, cinemas, individual residences and villas. His projects made use of structural elements of various types, such as mushroom structural supports, and thin concrete shell vaults, which became a signature element of his work. Although various types of foundations were used, he developed a special type of concrete ground slab foundations that made good use of thin vaults in the shape of hyperbolic paraboloids. Shebib also developed a pyramidal type of foundation.

== Sources ==
- Georges Binder, Tall Buildings of Europe, Middle East & Africa, Images (2007) ISBN 1-876907-81-9
