= Belmont Building =

- Interactive map of the Belmont Building area

General information
- Status: Completed
- Type: Commercial
- Location: Cairo, Egypt
- Coordinates: 30°2′3.18″N 31°13′45.65″E
- Opening: 1954

Height
- Roof: 348 ft (106 m)

Technical details
- Floor count: 31

Design and construction
- Architect: Naoum Shebib
- Main contractor: Naoum Shebib

The Thabet-Thabet Building is a skyscraper located on the banks of the Nile in the Garden City district of Cairo, Egypt. It was named after its original owner. The building, which stands 31 stories tall, was designed, engineered, and constructed by Naoum Shebib, and was completed in 1954.

The building is also popularly known to locals as the Belmont Building, as it once hosted a large advertisement for Belmont cigarettes on its rooftop.

Upon its completion in 1954, the Belmont Building became the tallest structure in Cairo. It held this title until 1961, when it was surpassed by the Cairo Tower. It was also the tallest building in Africa until 1965, when it was overtaken by the Schlesinger Building in Johannesburg, South Africa.

== See also ==
- Skyscraper design and construction
- List of tallest buildings in Africa
- List of tallest buildings and structures in Egypt

Records
Unknown	Tallest building in Africa; 106 m (348 ft); 1954 – 1965	Succeeded by Schlesinger Building
