= Ahmed Abboud Pasha =

Egyptian entrepreneur

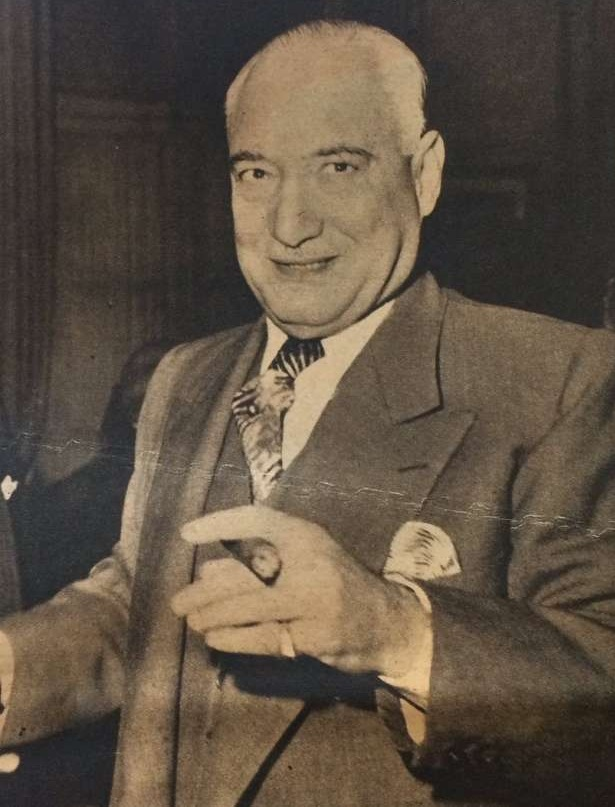
Ahmed Abboud Pasha

Mohamed Ahmed Abboud Pasha (Arabic: محمد أحمد عبود باشا) (1889–1963) was a prominent Egyptian industrialist, engineer and investor. Abboud Pasha was self-made, eventually rising to great wealth and was, by the 1950s, widely regarded as one of the top 10 richest men in the world.

== Early years ==
Born on 2 May 1889 to a middle-class family in Cairo and largely brought up by his mother, Labiba, Abboud Pasha excelled at school, eventually winning an Ottoman Scholarship and electing to study Engineering and Shipbuilding at the University of Glasgow in 1905. As part of the terms of his scholarship, he worked on the expansion of the network of the Hejaz Railway in Iraq and Palestine, as well as various irrigation projects on the Euphrates.

== Personal life ==
Whilst studying in Glasgow he met his future wife Jemima, the daughter of a Scottish Presbyterian family. In the face of her family's opposition to their marriage, they subsequently eloped to Constantinople, where Abboud Pasha was stationed under the terms of his scholarship from 1912. In 1923 the couple celebrated the birth of their only child, Mona, in Alexandria.

== Business activities ==
By the end of WW1, Ahmed Abboud was sufficiently well-established to set himself up independently and return to Egypt. He created a construction and dredging company in 1924, which originally focused on contract work on government-financed projects such as the heightening and enlarging of the Aswan Dam as well as the Fouadeya Irrigation Canal. He then proceeded to establish the Egyptian General Omnibus Company with its terminus in Shubra, Cairo.

In 1926 he entered politics as a nationalist Congressman of the Wafd Party for 'Markaz Atfih' South of Cairo. He advocated for a Liberal Constitution with a demand for the return of Egyptian industry to Egyptian hands – as much had been seized by European powers in preceding years in lieu of debts incurred by Khedive Ismail. In the same year he founded the daily newspaper, Al Kashaf, to propound these views more widely. The paper's first editor was Abdul Rahman Pasha Azzam, who later founded the Arab League in the mid-1940s.

In 1931, Ahmed Abboud was awarded the title of Pasha by King Fouad and was appointed to the higher house of parliament. By 1934, Abboud Pasha had acquired 6400 feddans (acres) of sugarcane fields from Belgian interests in Armant, south of Luxor, as well as two sugar refineries based in Naga Hamadi and Kom Ombo – such that by WW2 he was one of the leading sugar manufacturers and exporters in the world.

Abboud Pasha also acquired considerable shipping interests, notably the Khedival Mail Line, which he bought in 1930. The company was originally founded in the mid-1850s in Egypt but then later acquired by Lord Inchcape of P&O Shipping, and in 1936 Abboud Pasha renamed it the Pharaonic Line, thereby successfully returning the company under the Egyptian flag. Abboud Pasha is credited with greatly expanding its fleet of ocean liners from six aging vessels to 40 modern ships, including S.S. Mohammed Aly El Kabeer and S.S. Malek Fouad.

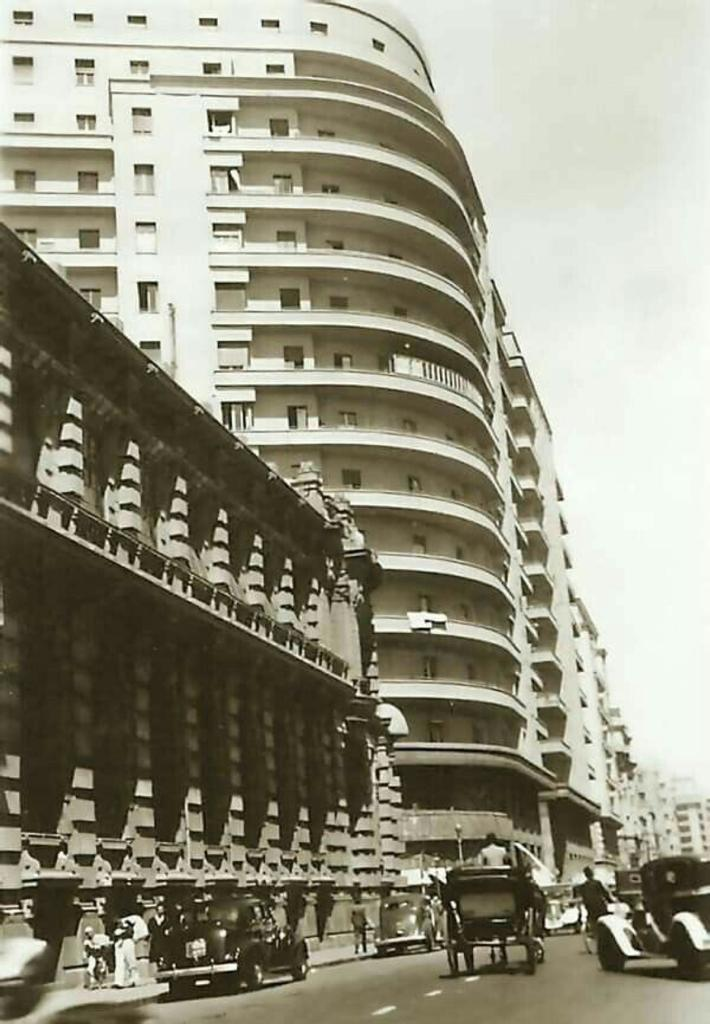
Immobilia Building, pictured in 1940

By the 1940s he built the ground-breaking Immobilia Building in downtown Cairo. The building is an iconic landmark, covers over 5444 square metres, is considered Egypt's first skyscraper and was the tallest building in the Middle East at the time. Abboud had also by this time become the largest shareholder of, and was appointed Member of the Board to, Misr Bank. He also acquired a majority stake of Upper Egyptian Hotels, a luxury hotel group in Egypt which comprised the Shepheard's Hotel in Cairo, the Winter Palace in Luxor and the Cataract in Aswan.

In 1947 he had been the first Egyptian to be appointed to the Board of the Suez Canal Company, and by 1950 he had set up the Suez Fertilizer Co with the support of a US Exim Bank Loan in excess of US$5.5 million. By then, he was reportedly worth more than US$100 million.

By the mid-1950s, Abboud Pasha's business empire was entering a fresh phase. He assembled a consortium of 4 major US oil companies – Cities Service, Continental Oil, Richfield Oil and Ohio Petroleum. Serving as their Egyptian partner, Abboud Pasha headed the consortium to negotiate an agreement with the Egyptian government for a 30-year lease on exploration and production rights in a number of blocks in the western desert. In return, the consortium was required to invest US$30-40 million in the country, and a royalty would be payable on any oil produced. Initial results from the prospecting wells indicated the presence of significant reserves.

== Al Ahly Football Club ==
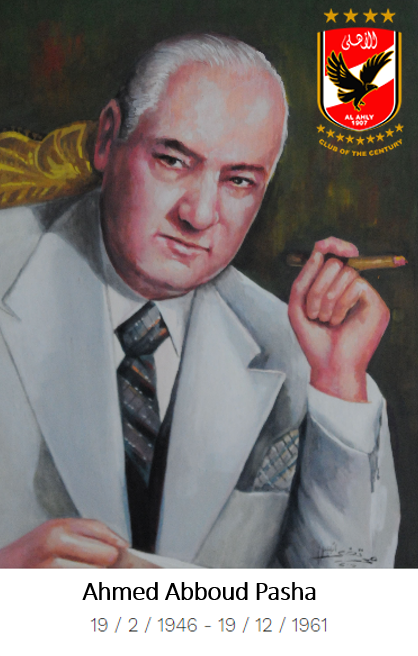
Ahmed Abboud Pasha, President of Al Ahly SC from 1946 to 1961

Abboud Pasha was one of the longest-serving Presidents of Al Ahly SC, Egypt's oldest and most popular club, serving over a sixteen-year period that is often described as 'Ahly's Golden Years’. Al Ahly decided to participate in the Egyptian national league for the first time in 1948, and the club then proceeded to win 9 consecutive championships. Abboud Pasha refused all government subsidies and supported the club from his private fortune. He built a swimming pool complex for the players and acquired additional land so that the club's grounds extended all the way to the Nile Corniche.

== Later years ==
In 1952 Gamal Abdel Nasser mounted a coup d'état in the Egyptian Revolution, eventually becoming president. For several years President Nasser refrained from alienating Egypt's industrial leaders – whose know-how was required to help see the 'new Egypt' through its growing period – and almost 10 years after the revolution one of President Nasser's close associates spoke of Abboud Pasha as 'one of the few good Egyptian capitalists [...] who invested his capital in this country'. However, Abboud Pasha's companies and assets were sequestered along with almost every Egyptian company of any size in the sweeping nationalizations of July 1961. In 1974 Egypt's highest court of appeals, in the first judgment of its kind, ruled that the confiscation of private citizens’ property was illegal and that compensation or restitution had to be implemented.

Abboud Pasha was put on a 2-day televised show trial in 1961 in which he was formally charged with illegally selling one of his own ships abroad and working to further British and US interests. The second day of the trial was never televised, and viewers were instead met by a blank screen. No verdict was ever rendered. Instead, the prosecution suddenly announced that the Government had decided to drop the case out of consideration of Abboud Pasha's 'past services to his country'.

In 1962 Abboud Pasha was allowed to travel to Washington on a special exit visa issued by President Nasser to renegotiate the Exim bank loan of US$5.5 million that had originally been extended to him personally for his fertiliser plant. Despite the fact that the plant had been nationalized by 1962, Exim Bank would only deal with Abboud Pasha. He was persuaded not to return to Cairo, as rumours circulated that Nasser intended to imprison him.

== Death ==
Ahmed Abboud Pasha lived out his final months in exile, and on 28 December 1963 died of heart failure at Claridge's Hotel in London. His body was never returned to Egypt as the request to bury him in his family's mausoleum in Cairo was refused.
