= Ramses Hilton =

Hotel in Cairo, Egypt

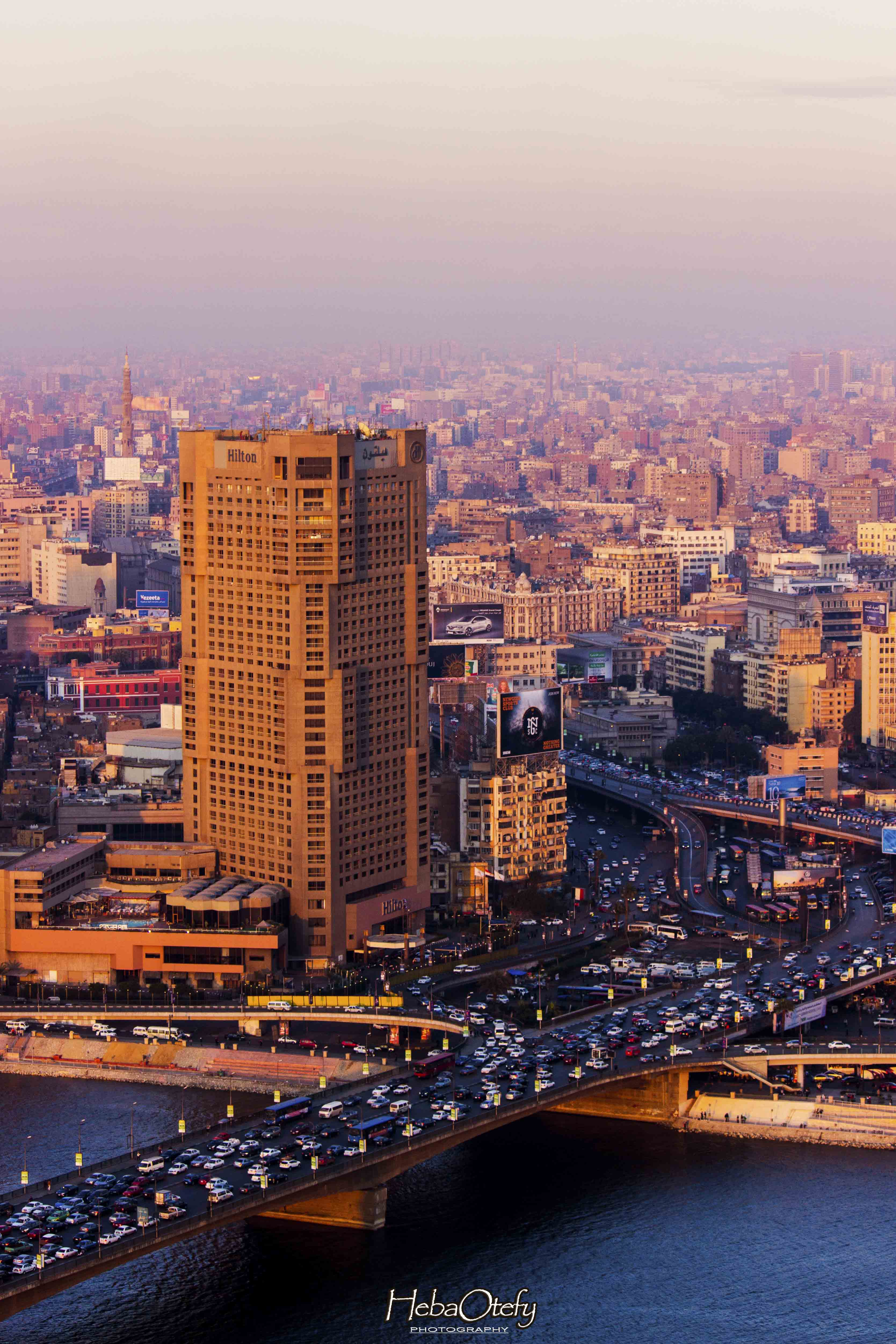
The Ramses Hilton, Cairo, Egypt.

The Ramses Hilton (Arabic: هيلتون رمسيس) is a 35-storey purpose built hotel on the Nile Corniche Street, in the Bulaq district of Cairo, Egypt. It was designed by the New York-based architects Warner Burns Toan & Lunde in collaboration with the Egyptian architect, Ali Nour el-Din Nassar. Its structural engineer was famed Egyptian civil engineer William Selim Hanna.

The 909-room hotel consists of a four-level podium of public spaces enclosing an atrium and a 30- story triangular tower of guest rooms and suites, with a restaurant/observation deck with "views of the distant pyramids." The building was designed in 1976 and was scheduled for completion at the end of 1979, though opened in 1981.

In 2019, a four-year LE 1bn. refurbishment of the hotel was planned.

== See also ==
Architectural drawings
