= Immobilia Building =

Building in Cairo, Egypt

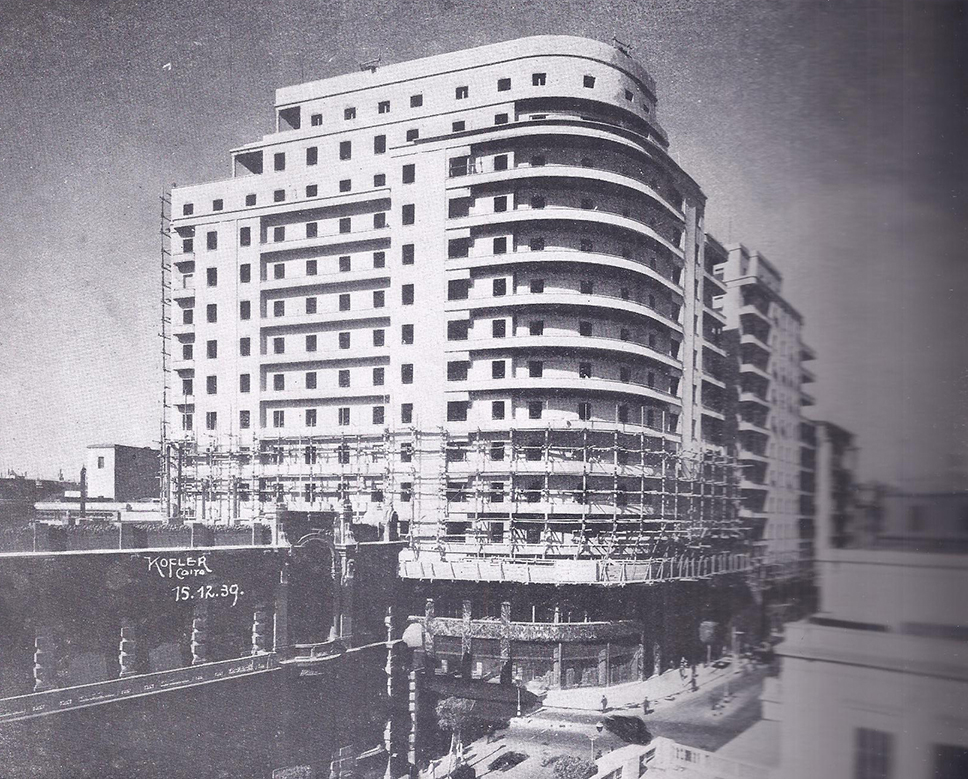
The Immobilia Building during construction

The Immobilia Building is a building that is considered to be Cairo's first skyscraper. It is located in Downtown Cairo at the intersection of Qasr el-Nile and Sherif streets. With a surface area of 5,444 square meters, it remains one of the biggest buildings in the Downtown area to date.

== History ==
Back in the middle of the 19th century the entire Downtown area was only sparsely populated. Under the rule of Isma'il Pasha of Egypt (1867 – 1879), grandson of Muhammad Ali Pasha, Egypt was greatly modernized and urbanized. It was during this time in the late 19th century when the Downtown district – previously a swamp land - was designed and built. Conceived by Khedive Ismail after Paris's elegant boulevards, it quickly became the most exclusive part of Cairo, reserved for the ruler's closest friends and top aides. In the late 19th century the same site as the Immobilia building today was occupied by a three-story villa built in a medieval Mamluk style for the Khedive's French horse-trainer, Gaston de Saint-Maurice (1831 – 1905).

By the end of the 19th century, Gaston de Saint-Maurice's villa was bought by the French embassy, who preserved it until the mid-1930s and then sold it to a consortium. On June 10, 1937, the consortium of the General Real Estate Society (Immobilia) hosted a competition with more than 14 participating companies. The competition was won by the French Max Edrie and the famous Italian architect Gaston Rossi, both already known and acknowledged for their designs of remarkable and famous buildings all over Egypt. For example, whilst Max Edrie designed the Radio Cinema and the French Hospital, Gaston Rossi was responsible for the Metro cinemas in Cairo and Alexandria, the Qasr al-Nile Cinema, the Kom Ombo Mosque, the Continental Hotel renovations, and the Automobile Club on Qasr al-Nil. Under the instruction of Ahmed Abboud Pasha, president of the Al-Ahly Club and the richest person in Egypt in the 1930s, Max Edrie and Gaston Rossi designed the Immobilia building.

The construction work began in 1938 and was completed in 1940 by the hands of around 4,000 workers, and amounts to E£1.2 million. The Immobilia building consists of two blocks in the shape of the letter “u”, with one complex holding 13 floors and the other one holding 11 floors, amounting to a total of 27 elevators, and 370 apartments. Each building has three public entrances for residents, and the building's elevators were divided into three categories: “Primo” for residents, “Secondo” for servants, and another for furniture.

However, in the beginning, its owners had a hard time renting the accommodations to tenants as prices ranged from E£6 to E£12, which was exorbitant at the time (apartments then ranged between E£2 and E£3). The owners then resorted to advertising campaigns in Egyptian and foreign newspapers. With seventy meters, the Immobilia building stood as the tallest building in Cairo at that time, and the advertisements for the building apartments were boasting about its views of the Nile, the pyramids, and the cupola of the church of Saint George. It was also the first building which offered an underground garage, with a capacity of up to 100 cars. The campaigns highlighted the building's strong foundations that would not be affected by earthquakes, and stated that tenants would be exempted from paying rent for a period of three months. Soon enough, the Immobilia building became known for uniquely combining residential apartments and company offices. All of this led to its rapid rise, and the Immobilia Building quickly became the most prestigious residential address of Cairo, housing Egypt's most famous contemporary celebrities, such as Leila Mourad, Omar Sharif, Kamal El Sheikh, Naguib el-Rihani, Mohammed Abdel Wahab, Abdel Halim Hafez, Mohamed Fawzi, and Kamelya. Famous visitors included the likes of Oum Kalthoum and King Farouk.

The Immobilia Building also served as the wedding venue of actress and singer Leila Mourad and the actor Anwar Wagdi. It was also in one of the building's elevators, where Naguib el-Rihani asked Leila Mourad to act alongside him in the movie “Ghazl Al Banat” (English: The Flirtation of Girls), a masterpiece of Egypt's Golden Age of Cinema.

== Present ==
The building remained in the possession of Abboud Pasha until 1961 when President Gamal Abdel Nasser nationalized private properties, including the Immobilia Building and transferred its ownership to Al-Shams Company for Housing and Development. The former owner, Abboud Pasha, suffered a similar tragic end as the building itself during his lifetime. He fled Egypt after the Revolution of 1952, died in exile, and failed to be returned to Egypt for his burial.

Previously, a sign bore the names of Immobilia's most prestigious visitors and thereby reminded passersby of the building's historical glory and contemporary importance. After the sign's curious disappearance, what remains on the facade is the name of the famous Naguib el-Rihani. Nowadays, in light of the hustle and bustle of the Downtown area, many owners of the residential units rent their apartments to commercial offices, law firms, and private companies. At the end of 2017, plans emerged for the building's restoration and renewal, but never came to be due to insufficient funding. Whilst today the Immobilia building's height is lost amongst the plethora of newer buildings towering around it, they still cannot compete with its presence and its status as Cairo's most iconic building. Its facade remains an architectural statement and can be admired right across the Old National Bank, and various other historically important buildings nearby.
