= Fairmont Nile City =

Luxury hotel located in Cairo, Egypt

Coordinates: 30.071774°N 31.227951°E

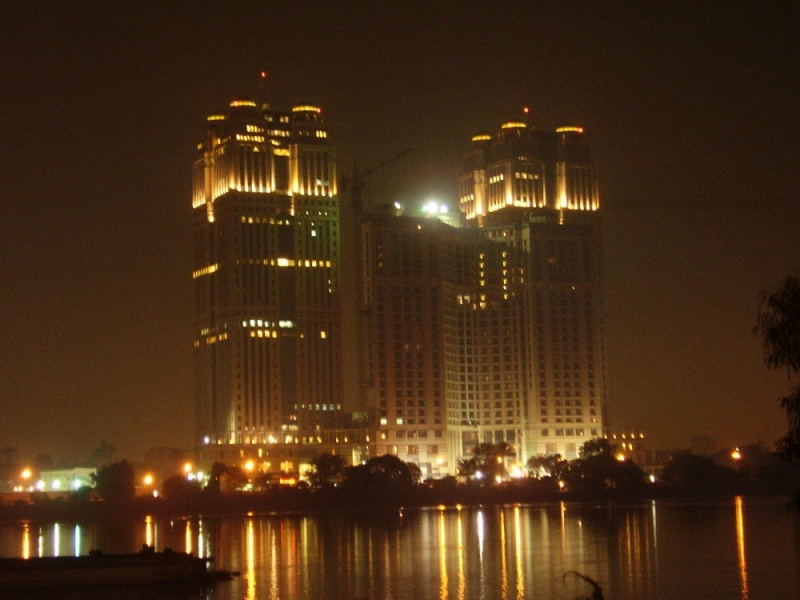
- Nile City Towers
- Interactive map of the Fairmont Nile City area
- Hotel chain: Fairmont Hotels and Resorts

General information
- Location: Ramlet Beaulac, Cairo, Nile City Towers - 2005 B, Corniche El Nil, Ramlet Beaulac Cairo, Egypt 2466
- Opening: October 6th, 2010
- Operator: Accor

Technical details
- Floor count: 25

Design and construction
- Architect: Hirsh Bender Associates

Other information
- Number of rooms: 562
- Number of restaurants: Bab El Nil; L'Uliveto; Gingko; Saigon Restaurant & Lounge; Onyx Lounge; Sky Pool; Champagne Bar; La Mie; Butter Box

Website
- www.fairmont.com/en/hotels/cairo/fairmont-nile-city.html

Fairmont Nile City is a hotel located in Cairo, Egypt and is a part of Accor. The hotel has 562 rooms, 8 restaurants, and 25 floors and is located alongside the Nile River.

== About the hotel ==
Fairmont Nile City opened on October 6, 2010, with Nile City Investment among the property's main shareholders. The building stands 105 meters high and was designed by the architectural firm Hirsch Bedner Associates. The hotel's interior incorporates Art Deco and contemporary design elements. A casino is also located within the property.

The hotel is situated between the two towers of the Nile City Complex. It is located within central Cairo and provides access to several of the city's major cultural and historical attractions, including the Grand Egyptian Museum, the Giza pyramid complex, the Great Sphinx of Giza, the Mosque of Muhammad Ali, and the Egyptian Museum.

== Food & beverage outlets ==
Fairmont Nile City has 9 food & beverage outlets on the property. These include.

- Saigon Restaurant: Saigon Restaurant offers a refined Pan-Asian dining experience, combining signature flavors with a unique sharing concept. Elegant interiors and panoramic Nile views create the perfect setting for an unforgettable culinary journey.
- Bab El Nil: Middle Eastern restaurant located at Fairmont Nile City in Cairo, Egypt. The restaurant serves Egyptian cuisine and features a setting inspired by traditional Middle Eastern design and hospitality. Its menu includes a selection of Middle Eastern dishes and local specialties.
- L'Uliveto: L'Uliveto is an Italian restaurant at Fairmont Nile City in Cairo, Egypt. It serves Italian and Mediterranean cuisine, including pasta and other traditional dishes, and features views of the Nile. The restaurant operates throughout the day and transitions into a bar in the evening.
- Gingko: Peruvian restaurant at Fairmont Nile City in Cairo, Egypt. It specializes in contemporary Peruvian cuisine and features an al fresco terrace overlooking the Nile, with a contemporary design and greenery-inspired setting.
- La Mie: La Mie is a French restaurant and café at Fairmont Nile City in Cairo, Egypt. It serves French bistro cuisine, including classic dishes, freshly baked pastries and coffee, and operates throughout the day.
- Butter Box: A grab-and-go deli offering freshly prepared sandwiches, baked goods, coffee and other takeaway items. The deli is located within Nile City Towers Mall and operates throughout the day.
- Onyx Lounge: Lobby lounge with light snacks, dessert, and a coffee & tea menu.
- Champagne Bar: Hotel bar offering cocktails, wine, and spirits with an emphasis on local Asian flavors.
- Sky Pool: Rooftop pool and restaurant area with hot and cold dishes, cocktails, and alcohol-free cocktails.

== Awards ==
Fairmont Nile City has won a variety of hospitality –related awards including

- Trip Advisor's “Certificate of Excellence” (2012, 2013, 2014)
- Trip Advisor Traveler's Choice Awards (2012, 2013, 2014)
- International Hotel Awards – Highly Commended Best Hotel in Egypt
- 2012 International Hotel Awards – Highly Commended Leisure Interior Egypt
- 2012 International Hotel Awards – Highly Commended Leisure Interior Egypt
- Booking.com Guest Review Award

== Hotel partnerships ==
The hotel has paired with a variety of other organizations including American Express, British Airways, HSBC seasonal offers, Travel Industry Association of Canada, and Visa card – Signature & Platinum. It has also hosted a variety of art projects and events, including Earth Hour, a rooftop event with live acoustic music and presentations from environmental expert speakers. It also joined The Canadian Embassy and the Children's Cancer Hospital in Egypt to host the Terry Fox Run in 2010.

== Facilities ==
The hotel is home to the signature Fairmont Spa which includes a health club and a range of spa treatments and wellness facilities. The spa has been recognized by Haute Grandeur as the Best In-Hotel Spa in Egypt and is ranked No. 1 among spas and wellness attractions in Cairo on TripAdvisor. The hotel also features Sky Pool, a rooftop pool and lounge located at the top of the property.
