= New Alamein =

City in northwest Egypt

New Alamein العلمين الجديدة
- City
- New Alamein
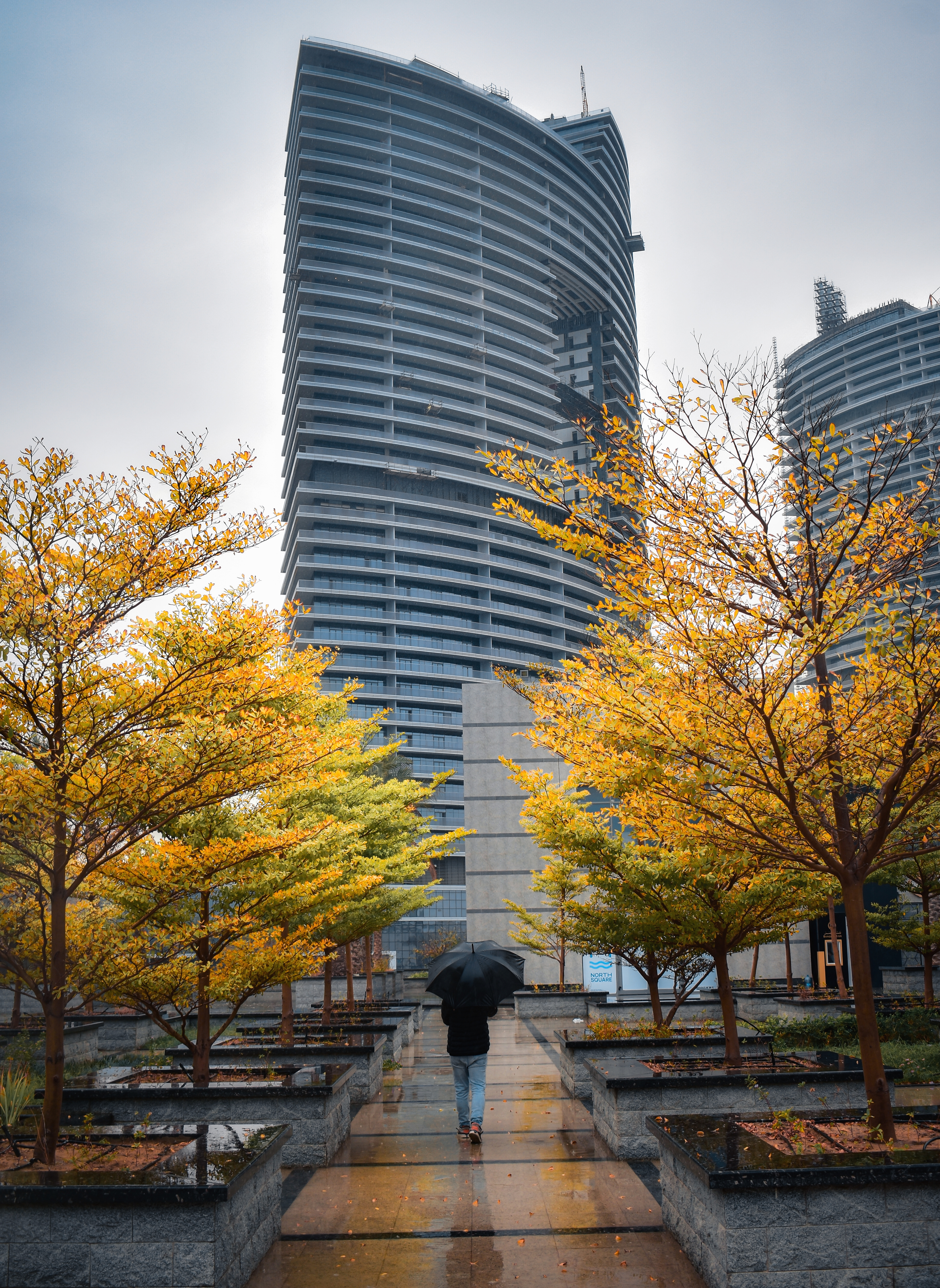
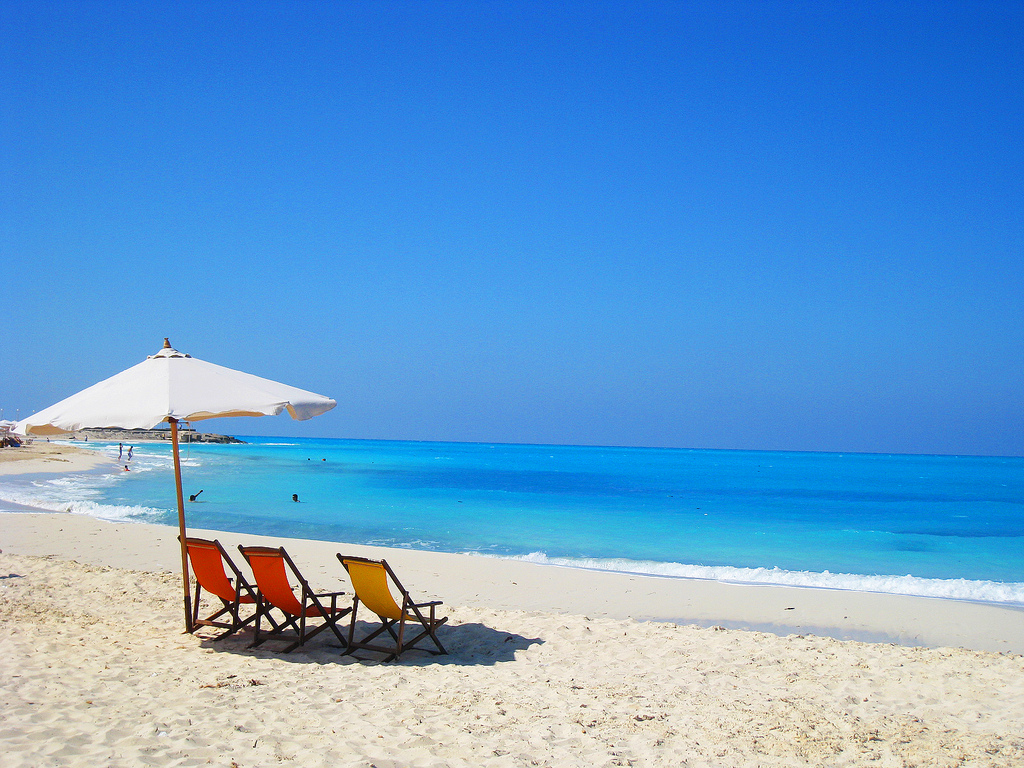
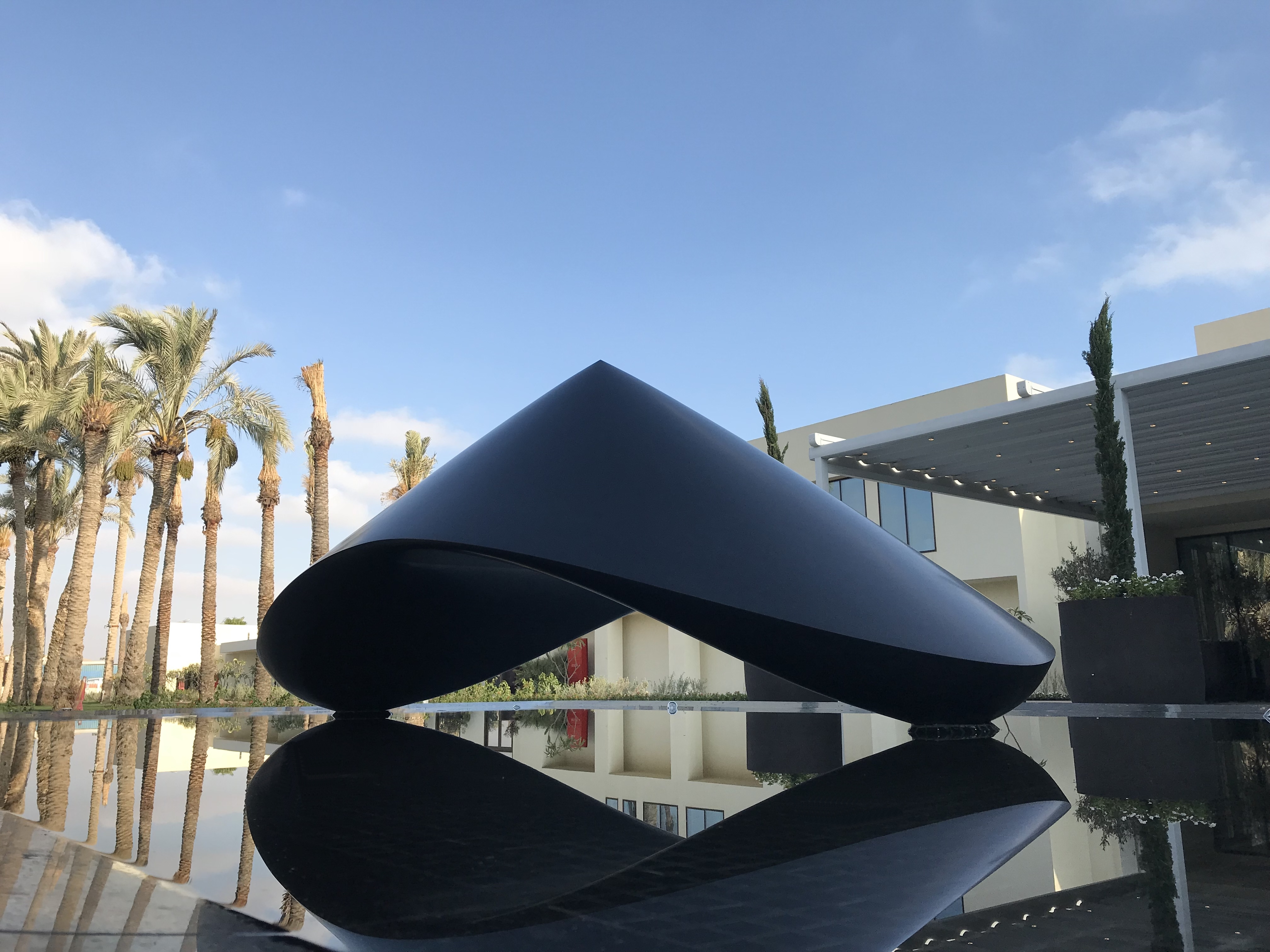
- New Alamein Towers City Tower Beachfront Business District Mediterranean beaches Armen Agop Structure

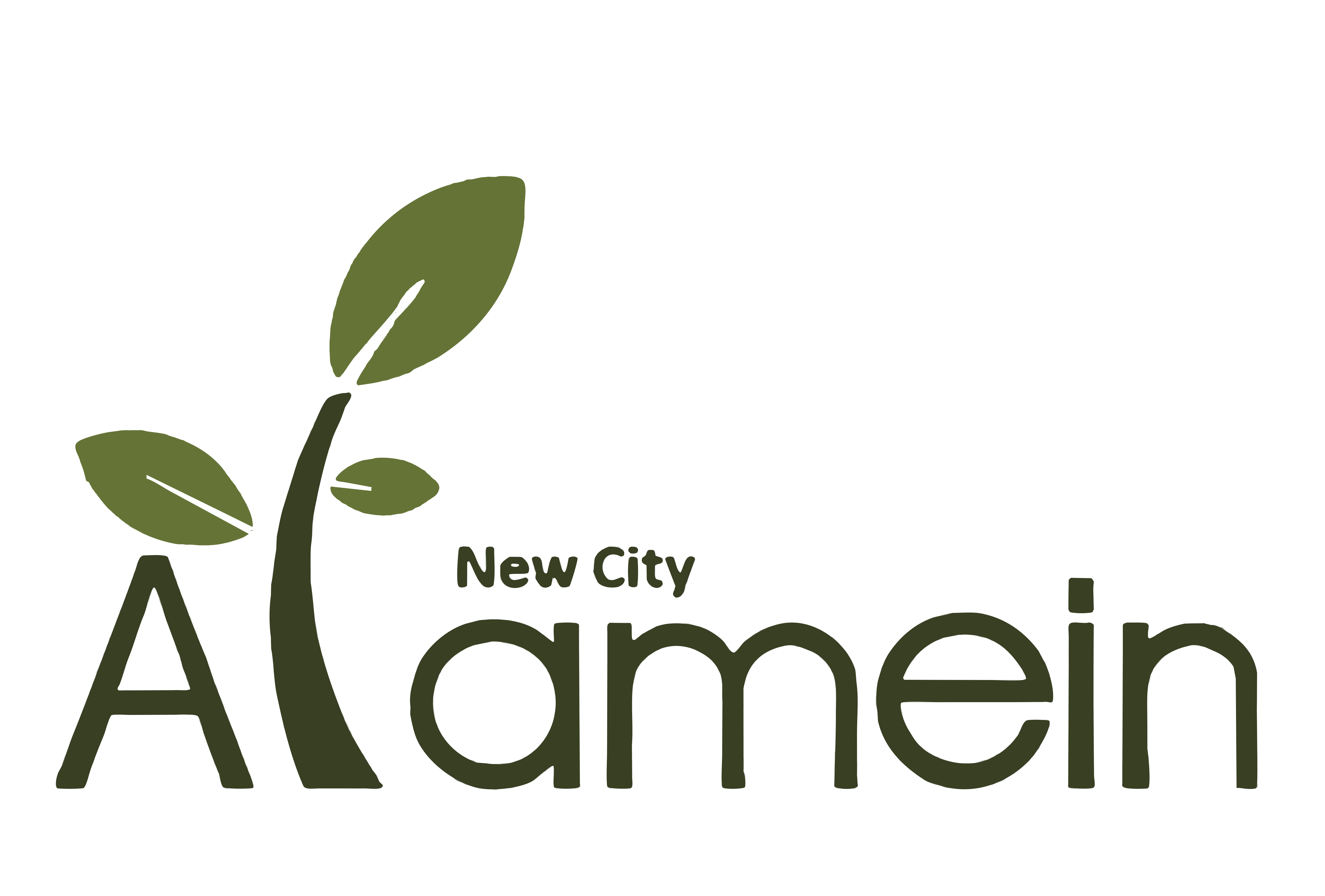
- Flag
- Nickname: Mediterranean Paradise
- Location within Egypt
- Coordinates: 30°51′26″N 28°51′19″E
- Country: Egypt
- Governorate: Matrouh
- Inaugurated: March 1, 2018
- Founder: President Abdel-Fattah al-Sisi

Population
  - Total: 200,000
- Time zone: UTC+2 (EET)
  - Summer (DST): UTC+3 (EEST)

New Alamein (Egyptian Arabic: العلمين الجديده) is a new fourth generation city in northwestern Egypt inaugurated by Egyptian President Abdel Fattah el-Sisi on 1 March 2018. New Alamein lies on the Mediterranean Sea, approximately 48 km west-northwest of El Alamein International Airport. Still under construction, New Alamein was conceived by the Egyptian government as a center for tourism, education, and government. The city has its own presidential palace and ministry building.

Construction is ongoing at New Alamein for three universities, fifteen skyscrapers and high rise towers, and 10,000 hotel rooms. Work has begun on Phase II of the New Alamein megaproject, which includes ten additional coastal towers. New Alamein is now approaching its final stages of necessary developing in order for it to become a operational and habitable megaproject for tourism and residential needs.

== History ==
Egyptian President Abdel-Fattah al-Sisi inaugurated New Alamein on March 1, 2018. Together with the as-yet-unnamed New Administrative Capital, which is set to replace Cairo as Egypt's capital, New Alamein is one of the mega-projects of the al-Sisi government. Abu Dhabi Crown Prince Sheikh Mohammed bin Zayed Al Nahyan toured the construction sites in New Alamein in March 2019. Completed projects include a mega-mall, restaurants, three cinemas, and the Al Masa mosque.

== Economy ==
The Egyptian government intends for New Alamein to bring large numbers of tourists to the Mediterranean beaches of the northwest coast. The government asserts that approximately 30 developers have been granted permits to move forward with the construction of hotels for 30,000 rooms. Many of these units are in high-rise buildings along the beach, with towers already under construction including The North Edge Towers and The Gate projects. Other centers of activity in New Alamein will include three universities and a "city of culture and arts" to encompass a Roman Theater, studio complexes, an opera hall, and a cinema complex.

Unlike the resorts on the northwest coast, which have private beaches sealed from public access, New Alamein is conceived as being an open city permitting entry to the general public.

== Skyscrapers and towers ==
Tower name	Usage	Height	Floors	Year started	Construction status	Year completed	Total area	Developer	Notes	Render
Alamein Iconic Tower	Hotel, Office and Residential	299 m (981 ft)	68	2021	Topped out	2026		NUCA	Alamein's tallest Tower	
D05		210 m (690 ft)		2021	Under construction	2026				
D06		210 m (690 ft)		2021	Under construction	2026				
D01M		210 m (690 ft)		2021	Under construction	2026				
D02M		210 m (690 ft)		2021	Under construction	2026				
Al Masa Towers 1	Leisure & Hospitality	~100m (~328 ft)	21	2019	Completed	2021	28,000 sqm	NUCA		
Al Masa Towers 2	Leisure & Hospitality	~100m (~328 ft)	21	2019	Completed	2021	28,000 sqm	NUCA		
Al Masa Towers 3	Hotel-serviced apartments	~100m (~328 ft)	21	2019	Completed	2021	31,500 sqm	NUCA		
Al Masa Towers 4	Hotel-serviced apartments	~100m (~328 ft)	21	2019	Completed	2021	31,500 sqm	NUCA		
Al Masa Towers 5	Hotel-serviced apartments	~100m (~328 ft)	21	2019	Completed	2021	31,500 sqm	NUCA		
Al Masa Towers 6	Hotel-serviced apartments	~100m (~328 ft)	21	2019	Completed	2021	31,500 sqm	NUCA		
Downtown Tower A	Residential Tower	210 m (690 ft)	56	2021	Topped out	2025		NUCA		
Downtown Tower B	Residential Tower	210 m (690 ft)	56	2021	Topped out	2025		NUCA		
Downtown Tower C	Residential Tower	210 m (690 ft)	56	2021	Topped out	2025		NUCA		
Downtown Tower D	Residential Tower	210 m (690 ft)	56	2021	Topped out	2025		NUCA		
LD00 Tower A1	Mixed Use		39	2019	Topped out	2025	85,000 sqm	NUCA		
LD00 Tower B1	Mixed Use		35	2019	Topped out	2025	77,000 sqm	NUCA		
LD00 Tower C1	Mixed Use		38	2019	Topped out	2025	85,000 sqm	NUCA		
LD00 Tower D1	Mixed Use		34	2019	Topped out	2025	70,000 sqm	NUCA		
LD01 Tower A2	Mixed Use		38	2019	Topped out	2025	75,000 sqm	NUCA		
LD01 Tower B2	Mixed Use		34	2019	Topped out	2025	70,000 sqm	NUCA		
LD01 Tower C2	Mixed Use		31	2019	Topped out	2025	65,000 sqm	NUCA		
LD01 Tower D2	Mixed Use		27	2019	Topped out	2025	50,000 sqm	NUCA		
LD02 Tower A3	Commercial, Hotel/Resort				Under construction	2025	50,000 sqm	NUCA		
LD02 Tower B3	Commercial, Hotel/Resort				Under construction	2025	50,000 sqm	NUCA		
LD02 Tower C3	Commercial, Hotel/Resort				Under construction	2025	50,000 sqm	NUCA		
LD02 Tower D3	Commercial, Hotel/Resort				Under construction	2025	50,000 sqm	NUCA		
LD02 Tower E3	Commercial, Hotel/Resort				Under construction	2025	50,000 sqm	NUCA		
LD03 Tower A4	Mixed Use				Under construction	2025	50,000 sqm	NUCA		
LD03 Tower B4	Mixed Use				Under construction	2025	50,000 sqm	NUCA		
LD03 Tower C4	Mixed Use				Under construction	2025	50,000 sqm	NUCA		
LD03 Tower D4	Mixed Use				Under construction	2025	50,000 sqm	NUCA		
LD04 Tower A5	Residential Tower	160 m (525 ft)	42	2021	Under construction	2025	81,000 sqm	City Edge Developments		
LD04 Tower B5	Residential Tower	160 m (525 ft)	42	2021	Under construction	2025	81,000 sqm	City Edge Developments		
LD04 Tower C5	Residential Tower	160 m (525 ft)	42	2021	Under construction	2025	81,000 sqm	City Edge Developments		
Marina Tower A	Mixed Use	150 m (492 ft)	40	2021	Under construction	2026	85,000 sqm	NUCA		
Marina Tower B	Mixed Use	150 m (492 ft)	40	2021	Under construction	2026	85,000 sqm	NUCA		
Marina Tower C	Mixed Use	150 m (492 ft)	40	2021	Under construction	2026	85,000 sqm	NUCA		
North Edge Tower A	Residential Tower	160 m (525 ft)	42	2019	Topped out	2025	81,600 sqm	City Edge Developments		
North Edge Tower B	Residential Tower	160 m (525 ft)	42	2019	Topped out	2025	81,600 sqm	City Edge Developments		
North Edge Tower C	Residential Tower	160 m (525 ft)	42	2019	Topped out	2025	80,500 sqm	City Edge Developments		
North Edge Tower D	Residential Tower	160 m (525 ft)	42	2019	Topped out	2025	80,500 sqm	City Edge Developments		
North Edge Tower E	Residential Tower	160 m (525 ft)	42	2019	Topped out	2025	80,500 sqm	City Edge Developments		
Orascom Tower A	Mixed Use	200 m (656 ft)	45	2021	Under construction	2027	90,000 sqm	NUCA		
Orascom Tower B	Mixed Use	200 m (656 ft)	45	2021	Under construction	2027	90,000 sqm	NUCA		
The Gate A	Mixed Use	170 m (558 ft)	44	2019	Under construction	2025	318,000 sqm	City Edge Developments		
The Gate B	Mixed Use	170 m (558 ft)	44	2019	Under construction	2025	258,000 sqm	City Edge Developments		

== Future proposed towers ==
Name	Usage	Max height	Roof height	Floors	Started	Construction status	Total area	Developer	Notes	Renders
Fourland Seaspark Twin Towers	Hotel, Office and residential	2x 200 m (656 ft)	2x 200 m (656 ft)	2x 45	N/A	Proposed concept	?			CUBE Designs

== See also ==
- El Alamein
- El Alamein Fountain (war memorial commemorating the battle, in Sydney, Australia)
- El Alamein International Airport
- Enham Alamein (village in Hampshire in England, renamed after the battle)
- Marina El Alamein (tourist resort)
