= List of transmission sites =

Sites of radio transmitters

In the following there are lists of sites of notable radio transmitters. During the early history of radio many countries had only a few high power radio stations, operated either by the government or large corporations, which broadcast to the population or to other countries. Because of the large number of transmission sites, this list is not complete. Outside of Europe senders and repeater stations are emphatically presented from international services.

== Legend ==
Abbr.	Legend
SW	Short wave
MW	Mediumwave (Amplitude modulation/AM broadcasting)
LW	Longwave
FM	Frequency modulation broadcasting
DAB	Digital Audio Broadcasting (digital radio)
DVB-T	Digital Video Broadcasting – Terrestrial (digital terrestrial television)
DVB-H	Digital Video Broadcasting – Handhelds (digital television for hand-held receivers)
VHF	Very high frequency (television)
UHF	Ultra high frequency (television)
VLF	Very low frequency

== Europe ==
=== Austria ===
- Deutsch-Altenburg Radio Station (LW, SW, shut down)
- Bisamberg (MW, dismantled)
- Kahlenberg (FM, TV)
- Moosbrunn (SW)
- Aldrans (MW, shut down)
- Dobl (MW, shut down)
- PatscherkofeL (FM, TV)
- Schöckl (FM, TV)
- Gaisberg (FM, TV)
- Freinberg (FM, earlier MW)
- Kronstorf (MW, shut down)
- Lichtenberg (FM, TV)
- Pfänder (FM, TV)
- Dobratsch (FM, TV)

=== Belarus ===
- Molodecno (VLF)

=== Belgium ===
- Schoten (FM, TV)
- Wavre (MW, SW, dismantled) FM DAB TV)
- Overijse (MW closed)

=== Bosnia and Herzegovina ===
- Mostre transmitter (MW)

=== Bulgaria ===
- Kaliakra (MW, dismantled)
- Vakarel (LW, MW, dismantled)

=== Croatia ===
- Grbre transmitter (MW)
- Deanovec transmitter (MW, KW)

=== Czech Republic ===
- Liblice (dismantled)
- Liblice (MW, closed)
- Topolná (LW dismantled)
- Mělník-Chloumek (MW closed)
- Dobrochov (MW closed)
- Ještěd (FM)
- Liblice (Am dismantled)

=== Denmark ===
- Kalundborg (LW, MW (dismantled))

=== Finland ===
- Lahti (LW, SW, shut down)
- Pori transmitter (LW, SW shut down)
- Pasilan linkkitorni (DVB-T)
- Anjalankoski Radio and TV-Mast (FM, DVB-T)
- Eurajoki TV Mast (DVB-T)
- FM- and TV-mast Helsinki-Espoo (FM, DVB-T)
- Haapavesi TV Mast (DVB-T)
- Hollola TV Mast (DVB-T)
- Kuopio Radio and TV Mast (FM, DVB-T)
- Lapua Radio and TV-Mast (FM, DVB-T)
- Oulu TV Mast (DVB-T)
- Pihtipudas TV Mast (DVB-T)
- Smedsböle Radio Mast (FM)
- Teisko TV-mast (DVB-T)
- Tervola Radio and TV-Mast (FM, DVB-T)
- Turku radio and television station (FM, DVB-T)
- Jyväskylä TV-mast (DVB-T)

=== France ===
- Allouis (LW, SW)
- Le Blanc (VLF)
- Issoudun (SW)
- Paris-Eiffel Tower (FM, TV)
- Lyon-Metallic tower of Fourvière (FM, TV)
- Sélestat (MW shut down)
- HWU transmitter (LW, SW)
- Col de la Madone transmitter (LW, SW)
- Lafayette transmitter (VLF)
- Limeux transmitting station (FM, TV)
- TV Mast Niort-Maisonnay (TV)
- Transmitter Le Mans-Mayet (FM, TV)
- Realtor transmitter (MW, partially dismantled)
- Sud Radio Transmitter Pic Blanc (MW, partially dismantled)
- Pic de Nore transmitter (FM, TV)

=== Germany ===
==== Baden-Württemberg ====
- Donebach (LW, dismantled) (DLF)
- Heidelberger Fernsehturm (FM, TV)
- Heidelberg-Dossenheim (MW, dismantled)
- Obereisesheim (MW, dismantled)
- Bad Mergentheim-Löffelstelzen (FM, TV)
- Mühlacker (MW, SW (dismanlted), FM, shut down)
- Stuttgarter Fernsehturm (FM, TV)
- Stuttgarter Fernmeldeturm (FM, TV)
- Raichberg Transmitter (FM, TV)
- Hirschlanden (AFN-MW, dismantled)
- Ulm-Jungingen (MW, shut down)
- Bad Dürrheim (MW, SW, shut down)
- Hornisgrinde (FM, TV)
- Heubach (FM, TV)
- Rohrdorf Bodenseesender (MW, SW, dismantled)
- Ravensburg transmitter in Horgenzell (MW dismantled)
- Freiburg-Lehen (MW, shut down)
- Stuttgart-Möhringen directional radio tower (FM)
- Blauen (FM, TV)
- Witthoh (FM, TV)
- Feldberg (Black Forest) (FM, TV)

==== Bavaria ====
- Kreuzberg (Rhön) (FM, TV)
- Heidelstein (FM, TV)
- Würzburg (FM, TV, MW (shut down))
- Hof (MW, dismantled)
- Thurnau (MW, dismantled)
- Dillberg (FM, TV, MW (shut down))
- Ochsenkopf (FM, TV)
- Brotjacklriegl TV Tower (FM, TV)
- Aholming (LW, dismantled) (DLF)
- Erching (LW, dismantled)
- Ismaning (FM, MW and SW (dismantled))
- Munich-Olympiaturm (FM, TV)
- Holzkirchen (dismantled, MW, SW) (IBB)
- Grünten (FM, TV)
- Wendelstein (FM, TV)
- Wertachtal (SW, dismantled) (DW)
- Nuremberg-Kleinreuth radio transmitter (MW, dismantled)
- Hohenstadt Transmission Tower (VLF)
- Koblenz radio transmitter (FM)
- Pfaffenberg, Aschaffenburg (FM)
- Gelbelsee, Ingolstadt (FM)
- Regensburg-Ziegetsberg (FM, TV)
- Hohe Linie (bei Regensburg) (FM, TV)
- Hohenpeißenberg (FM, TV)
- Hoher Bogen (UHF, DAB, TV, microwave, mobile phone)

==== Berlin ====
- Berlin-Frohnau (MW, shut down)
- Transmitter Berlin-Alley of Stallupone (MW, shut down)
- Radio mast Berlin-Scholzplatz (FM, TV)
- Radio mast Berlin-Olympiastadium (FM, MW, dismantled)
- Berliner Funkturm
- Berliner Fernsehturm
- Berlin-Britz (MW, FM, dismantled)
- Berlin-Köpenick (MW, SW, dismantled)
- Berlin-Schäferberg (FM, TV, MW (low power))
- Berlin-Müggelberge TV Tower (TV, planned but never completed)

==== Brandenburg ====
- Zehlendorf, Oranienburg (dismantled, LW, MW) (DLR)
- Transmitter Königs Wusterhausen (FM aktiv; LW shut down, MW (low power), SW (shut down))
- Nauen (SW)
- Golm transmitter (MW, dismantled)

==== Bremen ====
- Mediumwave transmitter Bremen (MW, dismantled)

==== Hamburg ====
- Hamburg-Billstedt ( FM, TV)
- Heinrich-Hertz-Turm (FM, TV)

==== Hesse ====
- Hoher Meißner (FM, TV)
- Weiskirchen (MW, dismantled)
- Weisskirchen (AFN-MW, dismantled)
- Großer Feldberg (FM, TV)
- Biedenkopf transmitter (FM, TV)
- Hardberg transmitter (FM)
- Mainflingen (LW, MW, dismantled)
- Biblis (SW) (RFE/RL, (IBB))
- Lampertheim (SW) (RFE/RL, (IBB))
- DCF77 (Mainflingen, LW)

==== Mecklenburg-Western Pomerania ====
- Schwerin-Zippendorf (FM, TV)
- Wöbbelin (MW, dismantled)
- Putbus (MW, dismantled)
- Schlemmin (FM, TV)
- Helpterberge (FM, TV)

==== Lower Saxony ====
- Saterland-Ramsloh (VLF)
- Aurich-Popens (FM, TV)
- Gartow (FM, TV)
- Steinkimmen (FM, TV)
- Sprakensehl-Bokel-Bokeler Busch (FM, TV)
- Hemmingen ( FM, TV)
- Lingen ( FM, TV)
- Cremlingen (MW, dismantled)
- Eilvese (VLF, shut down)
- Torfhaus (FM, TV)
- Peheim transmitter (FM, TV)
- Zeven (LW Decca, dismantled)

==== North Rhine-Westphalia ====
- Langenberg (FM, TV, MW (shut down))
- Nordhelle (FM, TV)
- Nordkirchen (MW, dismantled)
- Bonn-Venusberg (FM, TV)
- Wesel transmitter (FM, TV)
- Stolberg (FM, TV)
- Kleve (FM, TV)
- Bielstein (FM, TV)
- Eifel-Bärbelkreuz (FM)
- Jülich (SW, dismantled)

==== Rhineland-Palatinate ====
- Marienberg (FM, TV)
- Haardtkopf/Hunsrück (FM, TV)
- Rheinsender ( FM)
- Potzberg Tower (FM)
- Donnersberg (FM, TV)
- Scharteberg (FM, TV)
- Kleve transmitter (FM, TV)
- Kettrichhof transmitter (FM, TV)
- Sembach (MW, AFN, dismantled)
- Dieblich-Naßheck (FM, TV)

==== Saarland ====
- Heusweiler (MW, dismantled)
- Longwave transmitter Europe 1 (LW, Europe 1, dismantled)
- Göttelborner Höhe (FM, TV)

==== Saxony-Anhalt ====
- Brocken (FM, TV)
- Burg (LW, MW, partially shut down and dismantled, data transmission)
- Dequede (FM, TV)
- Goliath transmitter (VLF, dismantled and moved to Soviet union)

==== Saxony ====
- Wiederau ( FM, TV)
- Wilsdruff (MW, dismantled)
- Dresdner Fernsehturm (FM, TV)
- Deutschlandsender Herzberg/Elster (LW, demolished, moved to Soviet union)

==== Schleswig-Holstein ====
- Flensburg (FM, TV)
- Kiel-Kronshagen (FM, TV)
- Ehndorf (MW, dismantled)
- Bungsberg (FM, TV)
- Kiel Transmission Tower (FM, TV)
- Heligoland radio tower (FM, TV)
- Rantum (LW LORAN-C, shut down)
- Pinneberg (LW, SW, DDH47, weather fax)

==== Thuringia ====
- Wachenbrunn (MW, dismantled)
- Inselsberg (FM, TV)
- Bleßberg (FM, TV)

=== Greece ===
- Kavala (SW, MW, (IBB))
- Rhodes (SW, (IBB))

=== Hungary ===
- Budapest-Lakihegy (MW, LW)
- Solt (MW)
- Kékes (TV)

=== Iceland ===
- Hellissandur/Gufuskálar (LW)
- Úlfarsfell (DVB-T2, FM)
- Grindavík (SW)
- Eiðar (LW, 1938-2023, dismantled)
- Vatnsendahæð (LW, FM, DVB-T2, VHF, 1930-2021)
- Rjúpnahæð (SW, 1943-2008)
- Gufunes (SW, 1935-1993)
- Loftskeytastöðin á Melum (SW, 1918-1953)

=== Ireland ===
- Athlone (MW, partially dismantled)
- Cairn Hill (DVB-T, FM)
- Clarkstown (LW, dismantled)
- Clermont Carn (DVB-T, DAB, FM)
- Holywell Hill (DVB-T, FM)
- Kippure (DVB-T, DAB, FM)
- Maghera (DVB-T, FM)
- Mount Leinster (DVB-T, FM)
- Mullaghanish (DVB-T, FM)
- Spur Hill (DVB-T, DAB, FM)
- Three Rock (DVB-T, DAB, FM)
- Truskmore (DVB-T, FM)
- Tullamore (MW, dismantled)

=== Italy ===
- Santa Palomba (MW)
- Caltanissetta (LW, SW shut down)
- Santa Maria di Galeria (MW, SW, Vatican Radio)

=== Luxembourg ===
- Hosingen (FM)
- Junglinster (LW, SW, shut down)
- Beidweiler (LW, shut down)
- Marnach (MW, demolished)
- Dudelange (TV, FM)

=== Macedonia ===
- Ovče Pole (Skopje transmitter, MW)

=== Malta ===
- Delimara Transmitter (MW, SW, shutdown)

=== Monaco ===
- Roumoules (LW (shut down), MW, SW)

=== Netherlands ===
- Lopik (2 sites: MW demolished, FM, TV)
- Flevoland (MW, demolished)
- Smilde (FM, TV)

=== Norway ===
- Kvitsøy (MW demolished, SW shut down)
- Ingøy (LW shut down)
- Vigra (MW demolished)
- Helgeland (VLF)
- Noviken VLF Transmitter (VLF)
- Tyholttårnet (DAB)
- Tryvannstårnet (FM)
- Skavlen Transmitter (DAB, DVB-T)
- Høiåsmasten (DAB, DVB-T)

=== Poland ===
- Raszyn (LW)
- Konstantynow (LW, collapsed)
- Solec Kujawski (LW)
- Gliwice (MW, shut down)
- Przebędowo (MW, demolished)
- Wola Rasztowska (Warszawa III) (MW, shut down)
- Radom longwave transmitter
- Stolp radio transmitter (dismantled)

=== Portugal ===
- Muge (MW)
- Muro (FM, TV)
- Monsanto (Lisboa) (FM, TV)
- Monte da Virgem (Porto) (FM, TV)

=== Romania ===
- Brasov-Bod (LW, MW)

=== Russia ===
- Bolshakovo (LW (shut down), MW (test transmissions), SW (shut down)) (Voice of Russia)
- Krasnodar (SW) (Voice of Russia)
- Taldom (LW and SW shut down, VLF)
- Krasny Bor (LW, MW, SW, shut down)

=== Serbia ===
- Stubline (MW, KW)

=== Slovakia ===
- Nitra (MW)

=== Slovenia ===
- Domžale (MW)

=== Sweden ===
- Motala (LW, shut down)
- Orlunda (LW, demolished)
- Ruda (VLF)
- Grimeton (VLF, FM, TV)
- Multrå (FM, TV)
- Hörby (SW (demolished), FM, TV)
- Sölvesborg (MW shut down)

=== Switzerland ===
- Beromünster (MW shut down, partially demolished)
- Chasseral (FM, TV)
- Uetliberg (FM, TV)
- Säntis (FM, TV)
- Rigi Kulm (FM, TV)
- Prangins (LW shut down)
- Sottens (MW, SW shut down, partially demolished)
- Sarnen (MW, SW, shut down, partially demolished)
- Schwarzenburg (SW, demolished)
- Monte Ceneri (MW, demolished)

=== Spain ===
- Torreta de Guardamar (VLF)
- Arganda (MW)
- Majadahonda (MW, RNE Madrid)
- Dos Hermanas (MW, RNE Sevilla)
- Palau de Plegamans (MW, RNE Barcelona)
- Torre de Collserola Barcelona (FM, DAB, DVB-T, DVB-H -trial-, TV)
- Torrespaña Madrid (FM, DAB, DVB-T, DVB-H -trial-, TV)
- El Picayo València (FM, DAB, DVB-T)
- La Grajera Logroño (MW, RNE La Rioja)
- Hornos de Moncalvillo La Rioja (FM, DAB)

=== Turkey ===
- Büyükejder (TV, FM)
- Karadağ (TV, FM)

=== United Kingdom ===
- Alexandra Palace television station (FM, TV, DAB)
- Aspidistra (shutdown)
- Anthorn (VLF)
- Belmont (FM, TV)
- Black Hill (FM, TV)
- Bilsdale (FM, TV, DAB, DVB-T)
- Brookmans Park (MW)
- Burghead (LW, MW)
- Criggion (VLF, shut down)
- Croydon (FM, TV)
- Crystal Palace (MW, FM, TV)
- Droitwich (LW, MW)
- Emley Moor (FM, TV)
- Holme Moss (FM)
- Kirk o'Shotts (FM)
- Orfordness (MW, BBC)
- Rugby (VLF, shut down)
- Skelton (VLF, SW)
- Sutton Coldfield (FM, TV)
- Waunfawr Transatlantic Radio Station (VLF, shut down)
- Wenvoe (FM, TV)
- Westerglen (LW, MW)
- Winter Hill (FM, TV)
- Woofferton (SW, DRM, MW, FM)
- Wrotham (FM)

== Middle East ==
=== Syria ===
- Izza Radio Tower

== Africa ==
=== Algeria ===
- Tipaza Longwave Transmitter (LW)
- Beshar (LW)
- Oragla (MW / LW)

=== Morocco ===
- Tanger (SW) (Relay station IBB)
- Nador (LW, SW) Radio Medi

=== Rwanda ===
- Kigali (SW) (Relay station DW, demolished)

== Asia & South Asia ==
=== Hong Kong ===
- Temple Hill (TV)
- Mount Gough (FM)
- Kowloon Peak (TV, FM)
- Golden Hill (TV, FM, MW)
- Castle Peak (TV, FM)
- Cloudy Hill (TV, FM)
- Lamma Island (TV, FM)
- Beacon Hill (FM)
- Peng Chau (MW)

=== Indonesia ===
- TVRI Tower (TV)
- Komplek Pemancar RRI Cimanggis (SW)
- Komplek Pemancar RRI Bontosunggu (SW)

=== Japan ===
- Yamata (SW) (Radio Japan)
- Tokyo Tower (TV FM)

=== North Korea ===
- Pyongyang TV Tower (TV, FM)
- Kujang (SW) (Voice of Korea)

=== Northern Mariana Islands ===
IBB Robert E. Kamosa SW Transmitting Station

- Saipan transmitter site 3x100kW (former Superrock KYOI site)
- Tinian transmitter site 6x500kW, 2x250kW

=== Pakistan ===
- Radio Pakistan (MW, SW, FM)

=== Philippines ===
- Tower of Power (UHF/VHF TV, FM) (GMA Network, Inc.)
- Millemium Transmitter (ABS-CBN Corporation; decommissioned)
- The High 5 Transmitter Tower (UHF/VHF TV, FM) (TV5 Network, Inc.)
- Transmitter Tower (TV) (People's Television Network, Inc.)
- South Tower (TV) (Radio Philippines Network)
- IBC 13 Transmitter Tower (TV) (Intercontinental Broadcasting Corporation)
- Tinang (SW) (Relay station IBB)
- Malolos (SW) (Relay station Radyo Pilipinas World Service, Voice of America)
- Malolos (MW) (Radyo Veritas, Transmitter No. 1 demolished because of mall construction, Transmitter No. 2 still functional)
- Malolos (MW) (PBS, houses both DZRB and DZSR)
- Obando (AM)
- Bocaue (SW) (Relay station FEBC)
- Bocaue (MW) (FEBC, houses DZAS)
- Iba (SW) (Relay station FEBC)
- Poro Point (SW) (Relay station IBB)
- Antipolo (TV, FM)
- Mount Santo Tomas, Tuba, Benguet (TV, FM)
- Mount Amuyao, Mountain Province (TV)
- Mount Banoy, Batangas (TV, FM)
- Mount Bariw, Legazpi, Albay (TV, FM)
- Jordan/San Lorenzo, Guimaras (TV, FM)
- Mount Canlandog, Murcia, Negros Occidental (TV, FM)
- Valencia, Negros Oriental (TV)
- Mount Busay/RCPI Towers, Babag/Bonbon, Cebu City (TV, FM)
- Mount Canlais/Mount Naga-Naga, Tacloban
- Shrine Hills, Matina, Davao City (TV, FM)

=== Singapore ===
- Kranji (SW) (Relay station BBC World Service)
- Bukit Batok (FM, TV) (Mediacorp)

=== Sri Lanka ===
- Iranawila (SW) (Relay station IBB)
- Trincomalee (SW) (Relay station DW)

=== South Korea ===
- Namsan Tower (TV, FM)
- Gimje (SW) (KBS World Radio)

=== Thailand ===
- Udon Thani (SW) (IBB)

== Latin America ==
=== Brazil ===
- Brasília TV Tower (FM, formerly TV)
- Brasília Digital TV Tower (TV)

=== Ecuador ===
- Quito (SW) (HCJB)

== North America ==
=== Canada ===
- Sackville (SW) (RCI) (shut down)

=== United States ===
- Aguada transmission station (VLF)
- VLF Transmitter Cutler (VLF)
- Delano (SW) (VoA, Radio Martí) (demolished)
- Greenville (SW) (VoA, Radio Martí)
- Lualualei VLF transmitter (VLF)
- Marathon (MW) (Radio Martí)
- Camp Evans (VLF, shut down)
- Voice of America Bethany Relay Station (SW) (shut down)
- NIST Station WWV - Fort Collins, Colorado (SW)
- NIST Station WWVH - Kekaha, Hawaii (SW)
- Armstrong Tower
- Hughes Memorial (FM)
- KCTV (TV)
- Star Tower (FM, TV)
- Sutro Tower (FM, TV)
- WBNS (FM, TV)
- WITI (FM, TV)
- WOR (FM, TV)
- WTVR (FM, TV)

== Australasia ==
=== Australia ===
- Brandon (SW)
- Carnarvon (SW)
- Shepparton (SW)
- Bald Hills (MF)

=== New Zealand ===
- Mount Cargill (FM, DVB-T)
- Mount Kaukau (FM, DVB-T)
- Rangitaiki (SW)
- Sky Tower (Auckland) (FM, DVB-T)
- Sugarloaf (FM, DVB-T)
- Titahi Bay (MW)

== See also ==
- Telecommunications towers in the United Kingdom
