= List of tallest structures in Finland =

The following is a list of the tallest structures in Finland. This list contains all types of structures.

Name	Pinnacle height		Year	Structural type	Town	Coordinates	Remarks
Tiirismaa TV Mast	327 m	1073 ft	1988	Guyed mast	Hollola	61°00′24.49″N 25°31′24.33″E	Older 1967 built mast is now demolished
Haapavesi TV Mast	327 m	1073 ft	1978	Guyed mast	Haapavesi	64°09′58.23″N 25°15′39.68″E	
FM- and TV-mast Helsinki-Espoo (Latokaski TV-Mast)	326 m	1070 ft	1988	Guyed mast	Espoo/Helsinki	60°10′39.75″N 24°38′24.4″E	
Oulu TV Mast	326 m	1070 ft	1994	Guyed mast	Oulu	65°2′4.45″N 25°50′36.39″E	
Teisko TV-mast	325 m	1066 ft	1980	Guyed mast	Tampere	61°39′42.38″N 23°52′33.55″E	
Lapua Radio and TV-Mast	323 m	1059 ft	1961	Guyed mast	Lapua	62°57′21.09″N 22°57′10.82″E	
Vuokatti Radio and TV-Mast	323 m	1059 ft	1976	Guyed mast	Vuokatti	64°07′34.82″N 28°15′12.68″E	
Kiiminki TV Mast	323 m	1059 ft	?	Guyed mast	Kiiminki	65°7′9.6″N 25°44′31.4″E	Demolished in 1994
Kruunupyy Radio and TV Mast	322 m	1056 ft	3.4.1978	Guyed mast	Kruunupyy	63°44′06.9″N 23°30′17.9″E	
Eurajoki TV Mast	321 m	1053 ft	1964	Guyed mast	Eurajoki	61°16′53.13″N 21°41′53.88″E	
Pihtipudas TV Mast	321 m	1053 ft	1972	Guyed mast	Pihtipudas	63°17′19.23″N 25°38′48.83″E	
Kerimäki TV Mast	321 m	1053 ft	?	Guyed mast	Kerimäki	61°59′22.56″N 29°14′56.38″E	
Turku radio and television station	320 m	1050 ft	1965	Guyed mast	Kaarina	60°22′36.67″N 22°20′05.93″E	
Anjalankoski Radio and TV-Mast	318 m	1043 ft	1965	Guyed mast	Anjalankoski	60°41′31.71″N 27°2′47.52″E	
Kuopio Radio and TV-Mast	318 m	1043 ft	1970	Guyed mast	Kuopio	62°44′18.86″N 27°32′29.93″E	
Jyväskylä TV-mast	318 m	1043 ft	?	Guyed mast	Jyväskylä	62°12′24.99″N 25°38′22.68″E	
Tervola Radio and TV-Mast	302 m	991 ft	?	Guyed mast	Tervola	66°07′00.35″N 24°41′53.71″E	
Lähetysasema Radio and TV-Mast	276 m	906 ft	?	Guyed mast	Koli	63°03′50.78″N 29°46′59.4″E	
Varpulehto Radio and TV-Mast	275 m	903 ft	?	Guyed mast	Taivalkoski	65°18′05.54″N 28°21′15.68″E	
Pyhätunturi TV Mast	263 m	863 ft	?	Guyed mast	Pyhätunturi	67°01′14.28″N 27°12′52.42″E	
Pohja TV Mast	228.3 m	749 ft	?	Guyed mast	Pohja	60°07′31.85″N 23°29′35.6″E	
Susivaara Radio and TV-Mast	226.1 m	742 ft	?	Guyed mast	Posio	66°00′10.14″N 27°38′01.64″E	
Tuulispää TV Mast	225.2 m	739 ft	?	Guyed mast	Inari	68°51′08.23″N 27°07′23.85″E	
Torajärvi Radio and TV-Mast	218.2 m	716 ft	?	Guyed mast	Torajärvi	60°55′49.03″N 23°53′52.22″E	
Rovaniemi Radio and TV-Mast	215.1 m	706 ft	?	Guyed mast	Rovaniemi	66°32′57.71″N 25°34′16.45″E	
Smedsböle Radio Mast	212.1 m	696 ft	?	Guyed mast	Smedsböle	60°12′46.23″N 20°8′5.38″E	Tallest structure in Åland
Pyhävuori Radio and TV-Mast	212.1 m	696 ft	?	Guyed mast	Pyhävuori	62°17′13.14″N 21°38′30.63″E	
Joutseno Radio and TV-Mast	211.2 m	693 ft	?	Guyed mast	Joutseno	61°07′52.91″N 28°32′29.37″E	
Mikkeli Radio and TV-Mast	211.2 m	693 ft	?	Guyed mast	Mikkeli	61°35′05.42″N 27°27′54.4″E	
Jolkka TV Mast	209.1 m	686 ft	?	Guyed mast	Jolkka	63°44′07.2″N 23°30′18.68″E	
Kopsa Wind Turbines	199 m	653 ft	2013	Tower	Raahe		Nacelle height: 142.5 metres
Prysmian Tower	185 m	607 ft	2025	Building	Kirkkonummi		
Wasawind Wind Turbine	184 m	604 ft	2012	Additionally guyed tower	Vaasa		Nacelle height: 125 metres
Pori transmitter, Mediumwave Mast	180 m	591 ft	–	Guyed mast	Pori	61°28′50.57″N 21°34′8.81″E	Insulated against ground
Pernaja TV Mast	179.2 m	588 ft	?	Guyed mast	Pernaja	60°34′05.83″N 25°54′41.09″E	
Näsinneula Observation Tower	168 m	551 ft	1971	Tower	Tampere	61°30′17.63″N 23°44′35.82″E	
Vaskiluoto Chimney	150 m	492 ft	1953	Chimney	Vaasa	63°05′29.5″N 21°33′08.0″E	
Lahti longwave transmitter	150 m	492 ft	1927	Tower	Lahti	60°58′43.38″N 25°38′55.15″E	2 structures
Hanasaari Power Plant	150 m	492 ft	1973	Chimney	Helsinki	60°11′1.1″N 24°58′17.4″E	
Pasilan linkkitorni	146 m	479 ft	1983	Transmitter tower	Helsinki	60°12′16.75″N 24°55′24.34″E	
Vaasa FM mast	140 m	427 ft	unknown	Tower	Vaasa		
Alholmens kraft	130 m	427 ft	2000	Chimney	Jakobstad	63°42′00.1″N 22°42′39.2″E	
Ylläs Radio and TV Mast	126 m	413 ft		Guyed mast	Ylläs	67°34′01″N 24°12′41″E	
Kiihtelysvaara Radio and TV Mast	121 m	397 ft	?	Guyed mast	Kiihtelysvaara	62°24′16″N 30°30′10″E	
Iimäki Radio and TV Mast	117 m	384 ft	?	Guyed mast	Iisalmi	63°37′49″N 27°04′28″E	
Ritavaara Radio and TV Mast	101 m	331 ft	?	Guyed mast	Pello	66°47′48″N 24°06′58″E	
