= Mytäjäinen =

Mytäjäinen may mean

- Mytäjäinen (Lahti), area in Lahti, Finland
- Mytäjäinen (pond), a pond in Lahti, Finland
