= Radio Hill (Lahti) =

Hill in Lahti, Finland

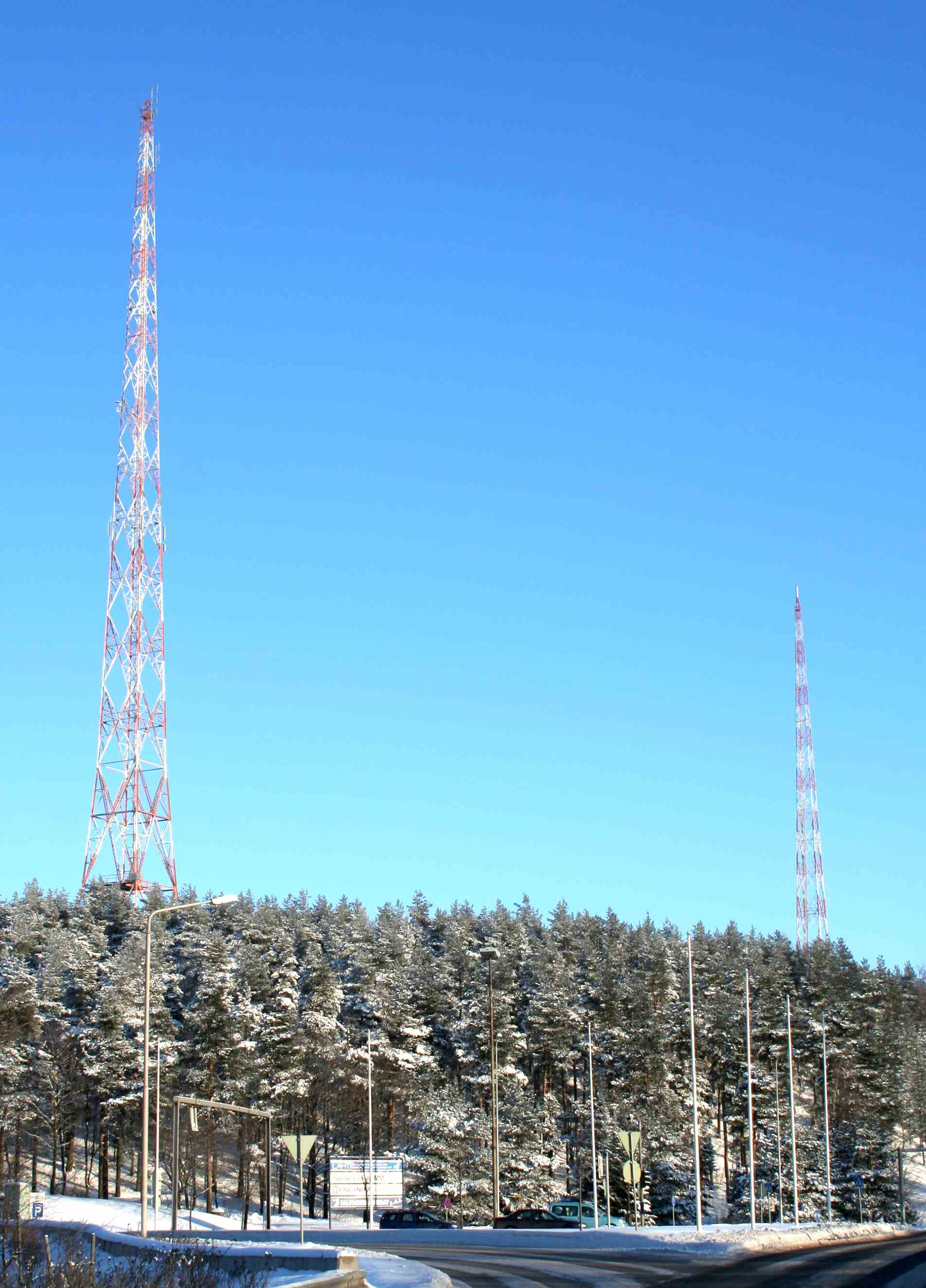
- Lahti radio masts on Radio Hill (seen in 2006)

Highest point
- Elevation: 140 m (460 ft)
- Coordinates: 60.9795°N 25.647°E

Naming
- Etymology: Named after Lahti radio station
- Native name: Radiomäki (Finnish)

Geography
- Country: Finland
- Region: Päijät-Häme
- City: Lahti
- Parent range: Salpausselkä
- Biome: Taiga

Geology
- Formed by: Terminal moraine
- Orogeny: Younger Dryas

Radio Hill (Finnish: Radiomäki) is a hill located in the city centre of Lahti, Finland. It is part of the Salpausselkä ridge system, with its peak at an elevation of c. 140 metres (460 ft).

The hill's earlier name was Selänmäki ('Ridge Hill'). After a cemetery was established there in the 1890s, the hill became known as Hautausmaanmäki ('Cemetery Hill'). The cemetery, known today as Vanha hautausmaa ('Old Cemetery'), is closed to new interments.

The hill gets its present name from the Lahti longwave transmitter station established there in 1927–1928, and operated by the country's public broadcaster, Yle, until its decommissioning in 1993. The Finnish Radio and TV Museum, known as Mastola, is now located on the site, operated as part of the City of Lahti municipal museums.

As a highly visible reminder of the radio station, the twin radio masts remain, standing 150 metres (490 ft) high and 316 metres (1,037 ft) apart, forming a well-known landmark of Lahti.

The hilltop milieu surrounding the earlier radio station has been designated by the Finnish Heritage Agency as a nationally important built cultural environment (Valtakunnallisesti merkittävä rakennettu kulttuuriympäristö).

The city's oldest track and field venue (converted in winter to an open-air ice rink), opened in 1922, is also located on the hill by the foot of the radio masts.
