= Zeven DECCA-transmitter =

Coordinates: 53°17′4″N 9°15′45″E

The Zeven DECCA-transmitter was a transmitting facility for DECCA transmission at Zeven, Germany. It used a 93-metre-tall (305 ft) guyed mast antenna, which is insulated against ground. As backup antenna, a 46-meter mast radiator also insulated against ground was in its proximity.

From 1952 until 1992 the DECCA transmitter Zeven belonged to the German DECCA chain, which consisted of transmitters at Brilon, Stadtkyll and Coburg-Lautertal. In this chain it was the "Green" station and transmitted on 127,1100 kHz. After 1968 the station served also in the Frisian DECCA-chain as the "Purple"-station and used the frequency of 71.433 kHz. From 1992 until the shut-down of Frisian Decca chain on December 31, 1999, this station was operated exclusively for this DECCA chain.

After shut-down of DECCA, the facility was not used until the 2004. At this year it started transmitting of DGPS-signals on the frequency 303.5 kHz.

In 2017 the 93 m tall mast was demolished, because a new built steel lattice tower adopted its task.

== See also ==
- List of famous transmission sites
