= Beshar =

Beshar is a surname. Notable people with the surname include:

- Christine Beshar (1929–2018), American lawyer
- Peter Beshar, American lawyer

== See also ==
- Beshear
