= Cabriès =

Commune in Provence-Alpes-Côte d'Azur, France

Cabriès Cabriés (Occitan)
- Commune
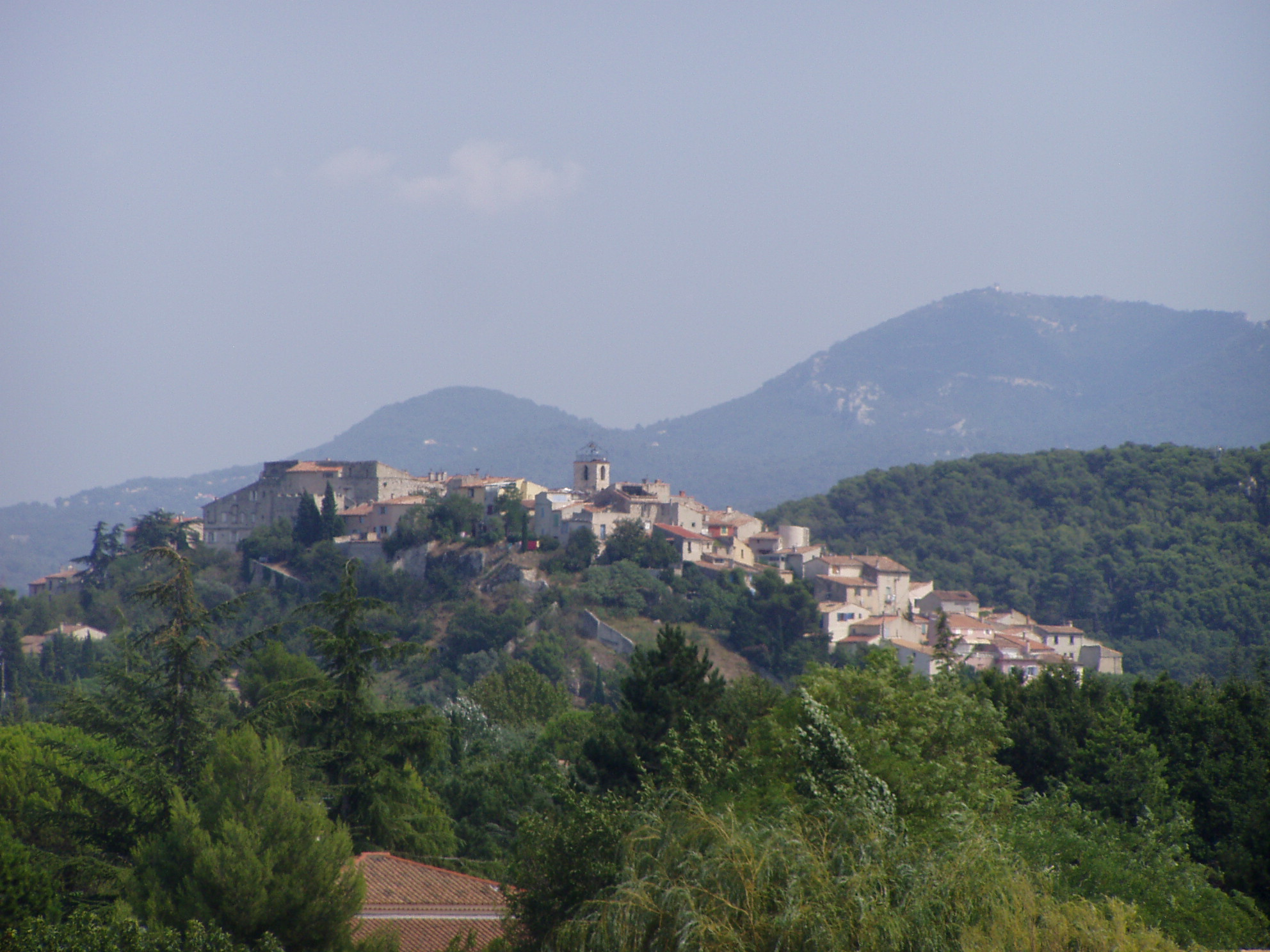
- View of the village

- Coat of arms
- Location of Cabriès
- Location within France Location within Provence-Alpes-Côte d'Azur
- Coordinates: 43°26′31″N 5°22′49″E
- Country: France
- Region: Provence-Alpes-Côte d'Azur
- Department: Bouches-du-Rhône
- Arrondissement: Aix-en-Provence
- Canton: Vitrolles
- Intercommunality: Aix-Marseille-Provence

Government
  - Mayor (2026–32): Amapola Ventron
- Area^{1}: 36.55 km^{2} (14.11 sq mi)
- Elevation: 210 m (690 ft)
- Highest elevation: 261 m (856 ft)
- Lowest elevation: 124 m (407 ft)
- Population (2023): 10,240
  - Density: 280.2/km^{2} (725.6/sq mi)
- Demonym: Cabriesiens
- Time zone: UTC+01:00 (CET)
  - Summer (DST): UTC+02:00 (CEST)
- INSEE/Postal code: 13019 /13480
- Website: www.cabries.fr
- ^{1} French Land Register data, which excludes lakes, ponds, glaciers > 1 km^{2} (0.386 sq mi or 247 acres) and river estuaries.

Cabriès (French pronunciation: [kabʁijɛs]; Occitan: Cabriés), also Cabriès-Calas, is a commune in the Bouches-du-Rhône department in southern France. It is just southwest of Aix-en-Provence.

== Population ==
Inhabitants are known as Cabriesiens (masculine) and Cabriesiennes (feminine) in French.

Historical population

Year	Pop.	±% p.a.
1793	976	—
1800	988	+0.17%
1806	965	−0.39%
1821	991	+0.18%
1831	1,058	+0.66%
1836	1,062	+0.08%
1841	992	−1.35%
1846	1,051	+1.16%
1851	1,038	−0.25%
1856	1,000	−0.74%
1861	1,059	+1.15%
1866	921	−2.75%
1872	925	+0.07%
1876	965	+1.06%
1881	951	−0.29%
1886	887	−1.38%
1891	871	−0.36%
1896	911	+0.90%
1901	903	−0.18%

Year	Pop.	±% p.a.
1906	892	−0.24%
1911	808	−1.96%
1921	810	+0.02%
1926	839	+0.71%
1931	825	−0.34%
1936	846	+0.50%
1946	884	+0.44%
1954	1,343	+5.37%
1962	1,614	+2.32%
1968	2,109	+4.56%
1975	3,328	+6.73%
1982	6,120	+9.09%
1990	7,720	+2.95%
1999	7,890	+0.24%
2007	8,305	+0.64%
2012	9,011	+1.65%
2017	9,751	+1.59%
2023	10,240	+0.82%

Source: EHESS and INSEE (1968–2023)

== See also ==
- Communes of the Bouches-du-Rhône department
- Realtor transmitter
