= Tower Building (Richmond, Virginia) =

Historic office building in Richmond, Virginia, US

- U.S. National Register of Historic Places
- Virginia Landmarks Register
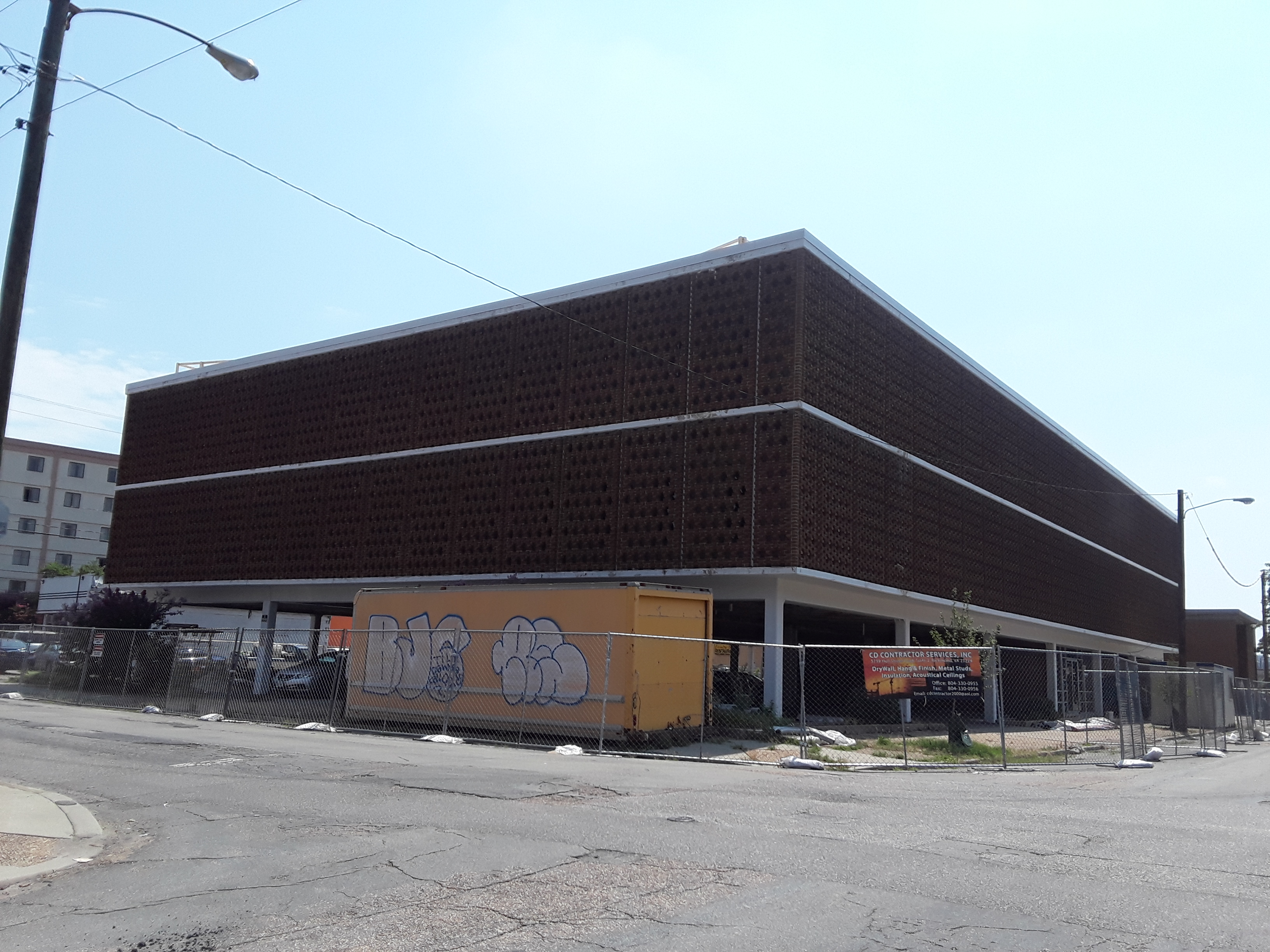
- The Tower Building in 2018

- Location within Virginia Location within the United States
- Location: 3212 Cutshaw Ave., Richmond, Virginia
- Coordinates: 37°33′57″N 77°28′32″W
- Area: 0.389 acres (0.157 ha)
- Built: 1961
- Architect: David Warren Hardwicke
- Architectural style: International Style
- NRHP reference No.: 100001854
- VLR No.: 127-6136-0004

Significant dates
- Added to NRHP: November 24, 2017
- Designated VLR: September 21, 2017

The Tower Building is a historic office building located in Richmond, Virginia. It was built in 1961 by architect David Warren Hardwicke, and designed in the International Style. It features a brise soleil made of brick as well as a ground floor shaded parking lot situated underneath the building's two stories of offices. The structure derives its name from the WTVR TV Tower located across the street.

The office building was listed on the National Register of Historic Places in 2017. It resides within, but is a non-contributing resource to, the Scott's Addition Historic District. It underwent a 2018 renovation and reopened as the upscale apartment building Hardwicke House.

== History ==
The Scott's Addition neighborhood of Richmond was a sparsely populated residential district during the early 20th century, but as suburban development spread outwards from the city center during the 1940s, much of the area was rezoned for commercial use. In 1953, the 843-foot-tall (257 m) WTVR TV Tower was completed, becoming the world's second-tallest lattice tower after the Eiffel Tower.

In 1959, a corporation formed by two local businessmen purchased a lot across the street from the tower for the price of roughly $50,000. Having decided to put rental office space on the site, they hired Richmond architect David Warren Hardwicke to design the building. Hardwicke chose the International style, which often foregoes ornamentation in favor of highlighting a building's geometric structure.

The building's construction was of prestressed concrete. It was designed with two prominent features that focused on overcoming issues with excessive heat at the site. The building's two floors of offices are situated atop piers and raised one story above the ground. The space beneath the building therefore provided a shaded parking lot for its tenants, and the offices were reached via a centrally located elevator. Additionally, the exterior of the building was covered with a brise soleil consisting of bricks lying at right angles from each other. This brickwork created a solar screen that insulated the interior offices from the sun.

Named the Tower Building after the nearby communications tower, the office building was the home of 17 insurance companies by four years after opening. The structure served as rental office space into the 21st century. In 2005, the surrounding Scott's Addition district was listed to the National Register of Historic Places (NRHP); the Tower Building, having been built after the district's period of significance, was a non-contributing resource. The building itself was listed to the NRHP in 2017. In 2018, it underwent a renovation and reopened as an upscale apartment building called Hardwicke House.
