= Hirschlanden transmitter =

Coordinates: 48.82870°N 9.03639°E

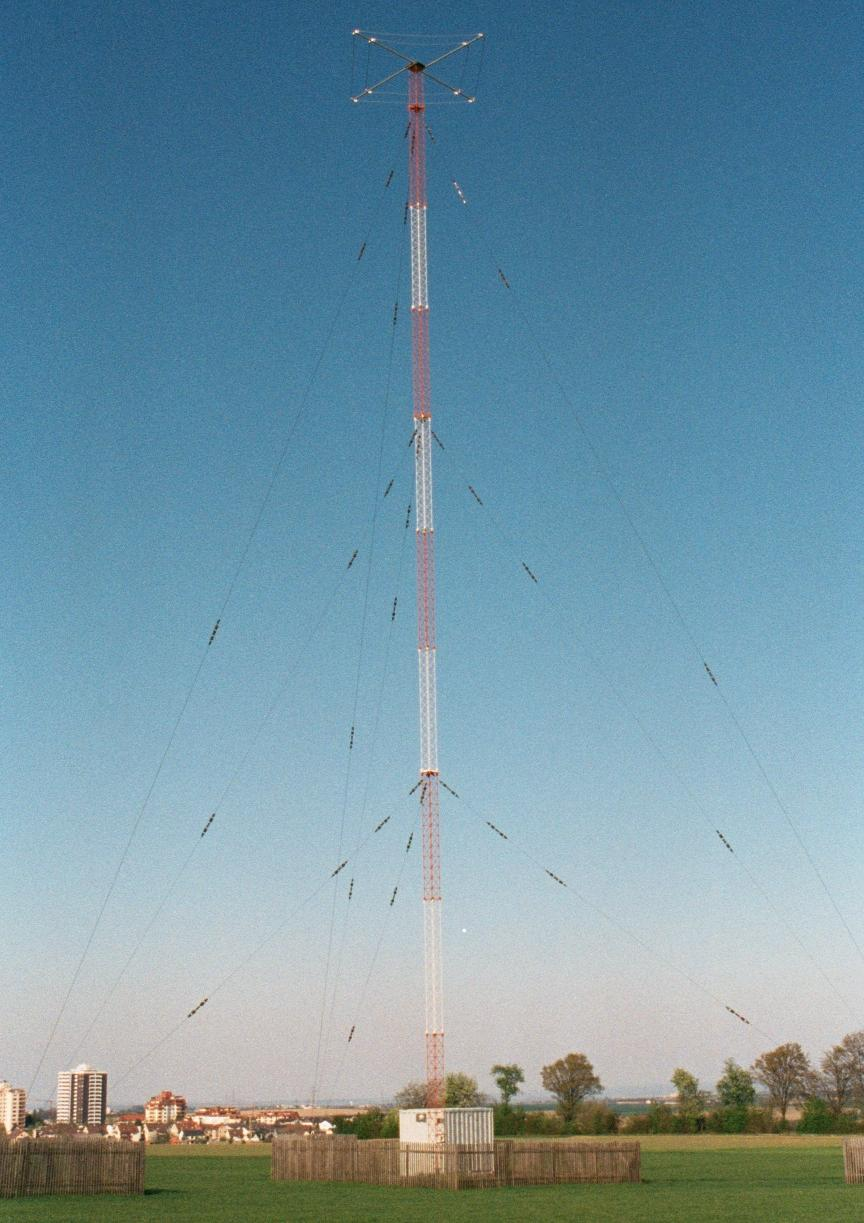
Mast of the Hirschlanden transmitter. The crosspiece at the top was mounted in 2001.

The Hirschlanden transmitter was a facility of the Deutsche Telekom AG (in earlier days: Deutsche Bundespost) for mediumwave broadcasting south of Ditzingen-Hirschlanden (a village which is a part of the German city of Ditzingen) situated at 48°49'47" N and 9°02'15" E.

The Hirschlanden transmitter was inaugurated in 1963 as a transmitter for the programming of Armed Forces Network (AFN) on 1142 kHz (after 1978, 1143 kHz) with a transmission power of 10 kW. It uses as antenna a 40-metre-tall (130 ft) guyed mast of lattice steel, which is groundfed and therefore insulated against ground. This mast, which has a rectangular cross section, was perhaps built in 1936, but used until 1963 at another site.

In 2001 the Hirschlanden transmitter was modified for simultaneous broadcasting on two mediumwave frequencies, for 1143 kHz with 10 kW output power for AFN and for 738 kHz with 5 kW output power for private radio companies. Therefore, the tuning house was replaced by a new one with a switch that allows the mast to be used for 738 kHz and 1143 kHz as well. The mast itself received a horizontal crosspiece on its top as roof capacitance, making it more efficient for 738 kHz. The second mediumwave transmitter was in use for the pop music radio station MEGARADIO from 16 January 2002 until 4 April 2003, when these transmissions ceased because MEGARADIO ran out of money. From that date only the AFN transmitter was in service until 15 August 2005, since when the second transmitter has been put back into use again for truck radio.

== See also ==
- List of famous transmission sites
