= WTVR TV Tower =

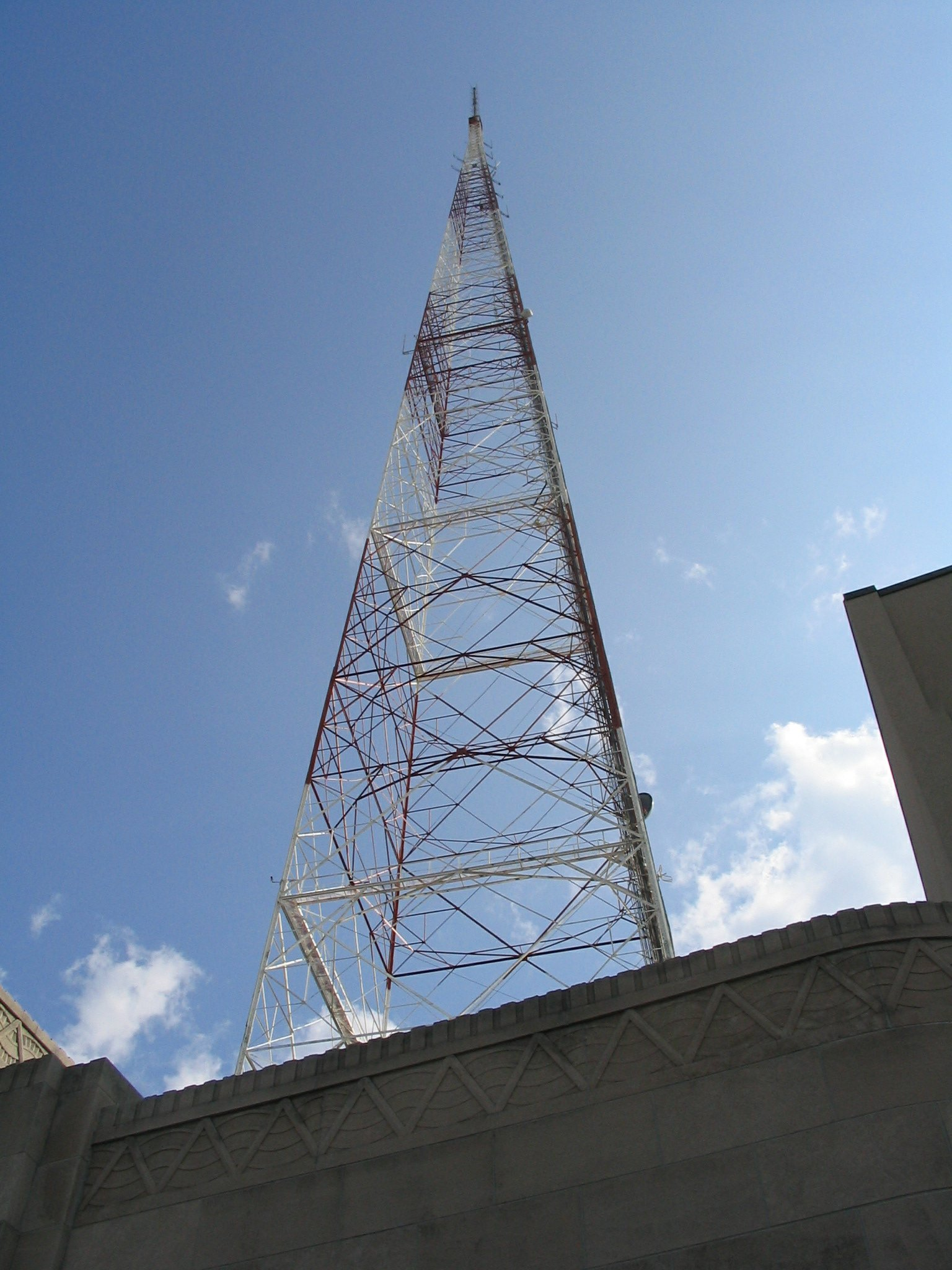

- Location within the United States

General information
- Type: Steel lattice television tower
- Location: Richmond, Virginia
- Coordinates: 37°33′59″N 77°28′34″W
- Completed: 1953

Height
- Height: 257 m (843 ft)

The WTVR TV Tower is an 843-foot-tall (257 m) free-standing lattice tower in Richmond, Virginia. It broadcasts WTVR-FM and has been in operation since 1953.

== History ==
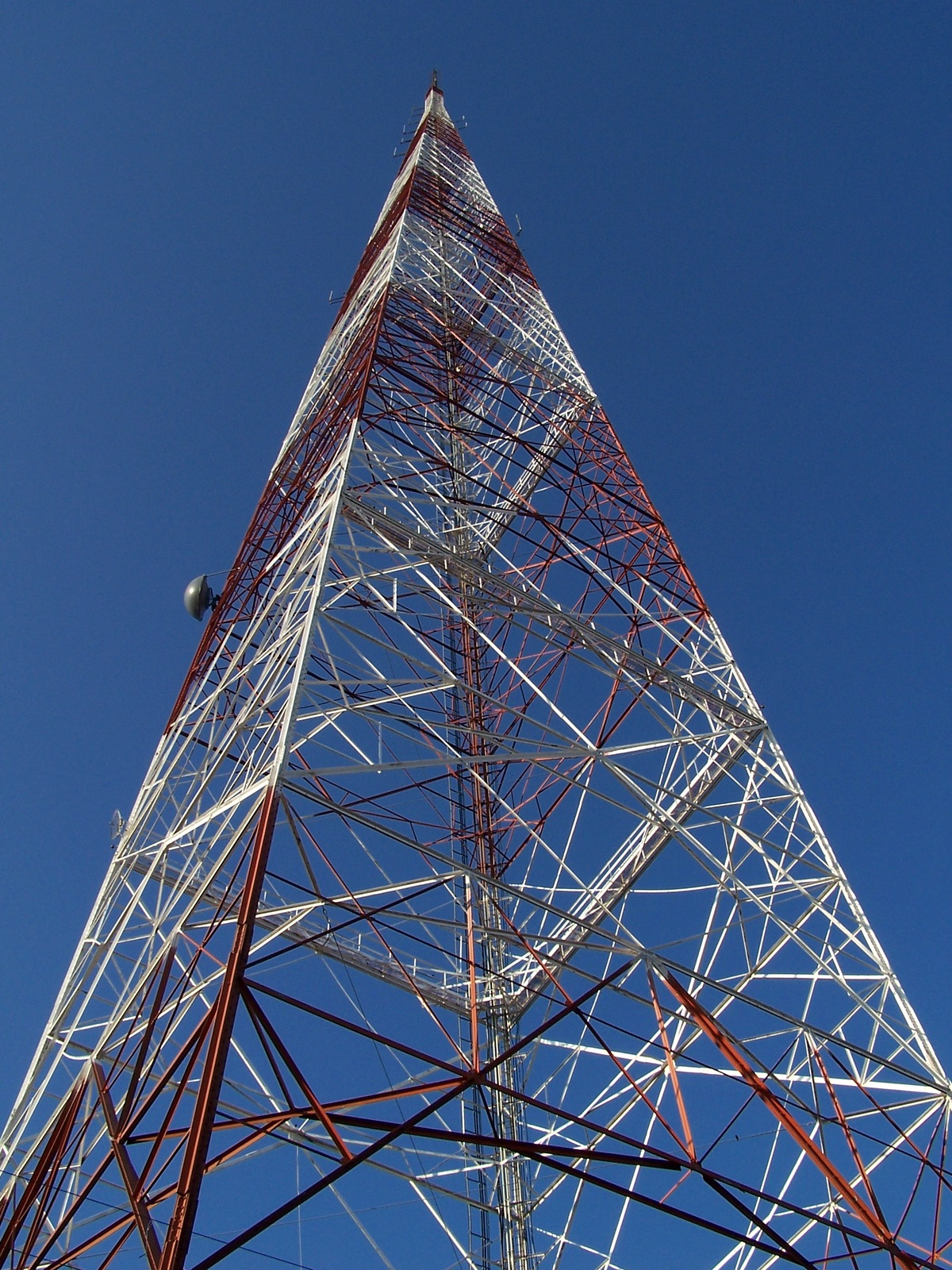
WTVR tower looking directly up from its base

Upon completion in 1953, the tower became the tallest in the United States and the second tallest lattice tower in the world after the Eiffel Tower and only surpassed in height by five buildings; the Empire State Building, Chrysler Building, 70 Pine Street, 40 Wall Street & the GE Building. It was a substantive increase from previous tallest towers of any type built in the United States, the NSS Annapolis. It remains to this day the tallest man made structure in Virginia.

The tower is currently only used by WTVR-FM. Even though WTVR-TV and WTVR-FM still share the same WTVR call letters they are no longer affiliated with each other and are under different ownership. WTVR-TV no longer broadcasts from this tower. WTVR-TV currently shares a transmitter location with PBS member stations WCVE-TV and WCVW. WTVR-TV stopped transmitting from this tower during the analog to digital conversion in 2009. The tower is still called the WTVR-TV tower because of its history, despite no longer broadcasting from this tower. On November 1, 2017, iHeartMedia announced that WTVR-FM, along with all of their sister stations in Richmond and Chattanooga, would be sold to Entercom due to that company's merger with CBS Radio. The sale was completed on December 19, 2017. The tower is considered part of the Richmond skyline and can be seen for several miles around. WTVR-TV's West Broad studios is located directly next to the tower. The station used a graphical version of the tower in its news opens for several years in the 1980s and early 1990s. The tower is also the namesake of the Tower Building, a National Register of Historic Places-listed structure located across the street.

== Stations ==
=== Radio ===
Currently only WTVR-FM transmits from WTVR Tower.

Callsign	Frequency	Format	Owner
WTVR-FM	98.1	Adult contemporary	Audacy, Inc.

== See also ==
- Lattice tower
- List of famous transmission sites
