= Mytäjäinen (pond) =

Lake in Lahti, Finland

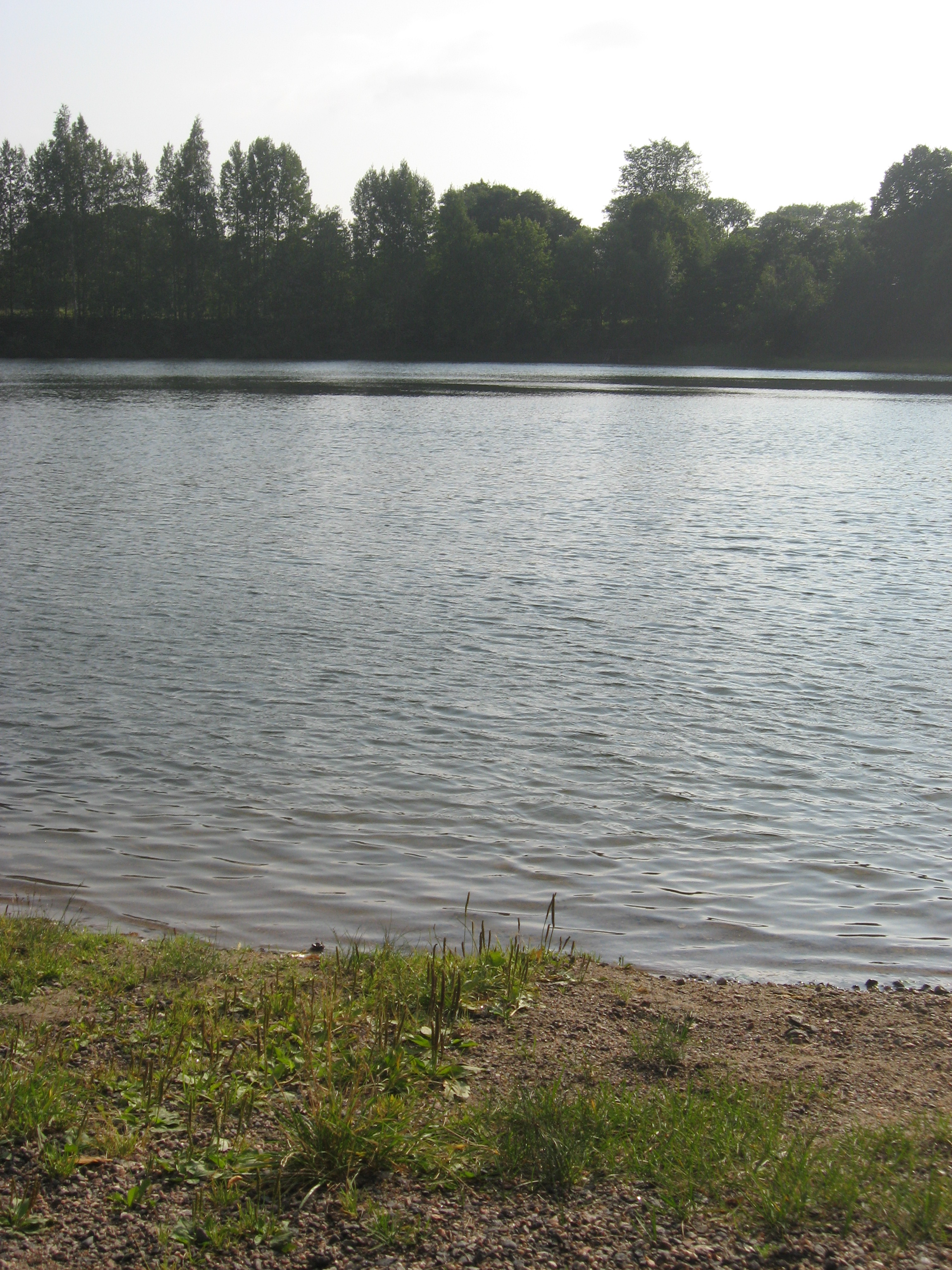

- Location within Scandinavia
- Location: Lahti, Päijät-Häme, Finland
- Coordinates: 60.978°N 25.637°E
- Max. depth: 11 m (36 ft)

Mytäjäinen is a small pond in Lahti, Päijät-Häme, Finland. Its greatest depth is 11 meters - large relative to the small area of the pond. Some people swim there also in winter time (Ice swimming). The pond is located near to Radiomäki in Lahti city. Mytäjäinen also refers to a small residential district in Sopenkorpi, Lahti.
