= Espoo radio and TV mast =

Radio mast in Latokaski, Espoo, Finland

Coordinates: 60°10′39″N 24°38′24″E

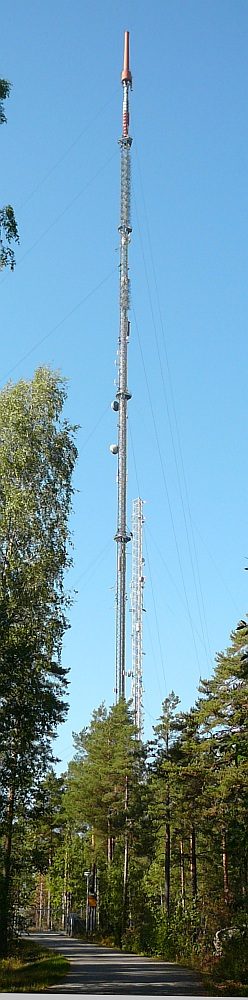
Espoo radio and TV mast

Espoo radio and TV mast is a mast located on Harmaakallio hill near Latokaski, Espoo, Finland. Its current height is 326 metres (1,070 ft).

When the mast was first built in 1971, its height was 303 metres (994 ft). Its height was increased to 326 metres (1,070 ft) in 1988, when the station was expanded, and the present mast was erected. It shares the title of third highest structure in Finland, after the Tiirismaa (in Hollola), and Haapavesi radio and TV masts. The radio mast in Kiiminki has the same height.

== Controversy with regard to Soviet-Estonia in the 1980s ==
The Espoo radio and TV mast originally used American technology, and since it also transmitted, unintentionally however, the Finnish TV broadcasts to TV sets in northern Estonia, there was a suspicion in the Soviet-occupied Estonia, and more specifically, within the Estonian Communist Party, that Americans had something to do with this radio and TV mast, and that it was in their interests that Finnish television broadcasts could be seen in Estonia, and that they had perhaps funded the mast. However, Sakari Kiuru, who functioned as the CEO of the Finnish state broadcasting corporation Yle during 1980–1989, stated to the Yle TV news in February 2011, that this transmitter did not use excessive power and that the Americans had nothing to do with it: “We really needed this mast, we had to reach the interior of the country and long distances to the west and the east. It is located near the shoreline, there’s nothing more to it, and the talk that the Americans would have funded it … they had nothing to do with it, the mast was funded from the Yle budget.” Yrjö Länsipuro, who worked as the Yle correspondent in Moscow during 1981–1978, said in the same broadcast on 24 February 2011, that as far as he could recall, the Soviet Union tried to influence Yle concerning the use of the Espoo TV mast, but the Finns had a clear answer to them: “This is what technology is like, we can’t do anything about it.”

Besides American TV series such as Dynasty and Finnish TV commercials, the Soviet authorities were annoyed at the Eurovision Song Contest being seen in Estonia. In a 2011 documentary on the song contest, an anonymous Estonian commentator said the following: “The Eurovision fan club in Estonia was secret, because Estonia was not part of the Eurovision network, the Soviet Union did not buy into Eurovision at all, so they watched Eurovision on Finnish television. It almost represented a symbol of resistance of the Soviet regime, it was almost like a window on the West. And they would have secret ‘Eurovision parties’, and it was very much seen as an illicit thing.”

Another curious episode took place in 1984, when the Soviet Union boycotted the Olympic Games that were held in Los Angeles. Many people from the Moscow elite travelled to Tallinn in order to see the games from the Finnish television, as they were not broadcast in the Soviet Union. The most popular place for them to stay was Hotel Viru.

== Radio transmissions of the Espoo Mast ==
Station	Frequency for “Main Programme” (now Yle Radio 1)	Transmission power for “Main Programme”	Frequency for “Parallel Programme” (now Yle Radio Suomi)	Transmission power for “Parallel Programme”	Frequency for “Swedish Language Programme” (now Yle Vega)	Transmission power for “Swedish Language Programme”	Frequency for “Local Programme”	Transmission power for “Local Programme”	Height of mast	Elevation of the location
Espoo	94.0 MHz; Stereophonic sound 91.9 MHz; Stereophonic sound (1 June 1982); 106.2 MHz (1 August 2010); 92.5 MHz (1 August 2010); 96.2 MHz Regional, licensed (1 August 2010); 87.9 MHz (as of 2024-08-16)	60 kW	91.9 MHz Stereophonic sound 94.0 MHz Stereophonic sound (1 June 1982)	60 kW	98.8 MHz Stereophonic sound 101.1 MHz (as of 2024-08-16)	60 kW	90.3 MHz Monophonic sound and 97.5 MHz Monophonic sound (1 June 1982)	10 kW with a directional antenna	303 metres (994 ft) (1971); 326 metres (1,070 ft) (1988)	44 m (144')

== See also ==
- List of tallest structures in Finland
