= Bodenseesender =

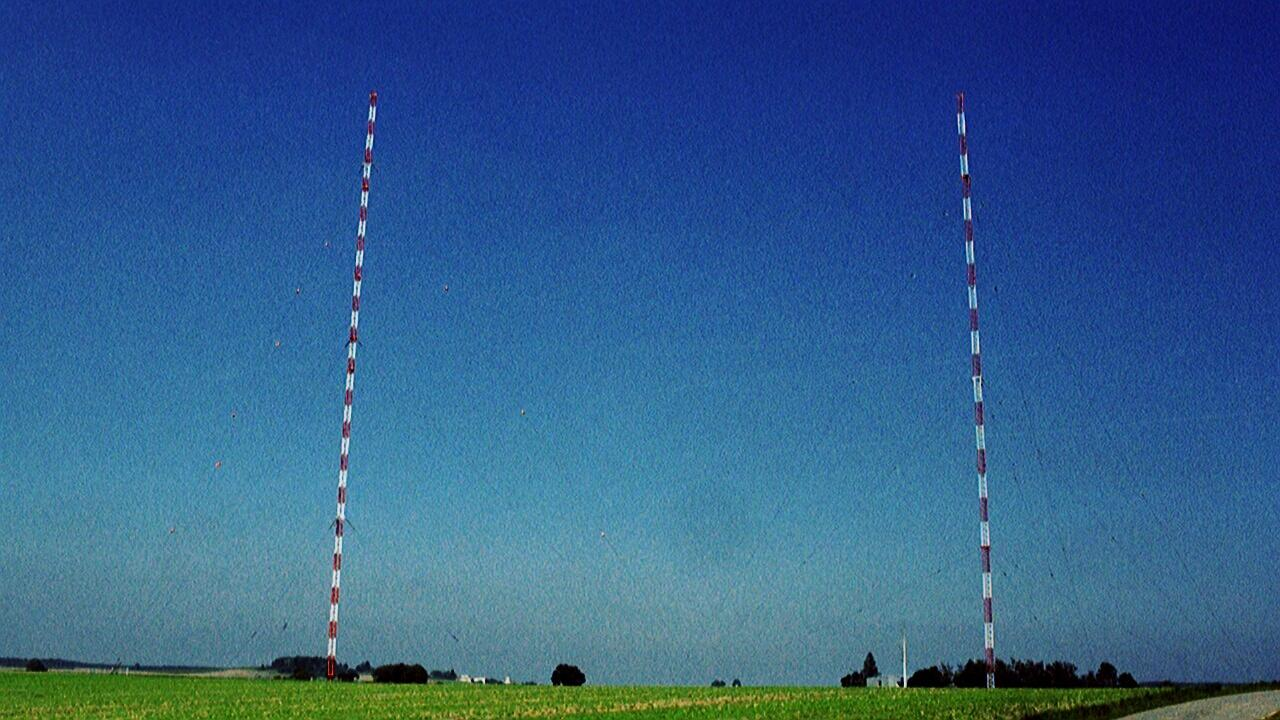
The facility of Bodenseesender in September 2005. Two of the three mentioned 137 metre tall masts were already demolished. The remaining ≈240 metre ("Direktor") mast can be seen right in the picture. In the left part of the picture, there is the 244 metre tall main transmission mast of Bodenseesender

Bodenseesender ('Lake Constance transmitter') was a radio transmission facility of VoA, US SWR (until 1998 SWF) near Meßkirch-Rohrdorf in Southern Germany for medium wave established in 1964. It shut down on January 8, 2012, and one month later, on February 7, 2012, the last mast was demolished.

== Background ==
Bodenseesender had been used since July 1, 2002 for the propagation of SWR Cont.Ra on the medium wave frequency 666 kHz, u v.a.. Until 1978 the aerial of the medium wave transmitter consisted of 4 guyed steel framework masts, which are insulated against ground. In the mid 1970s two of these masts were dismantled. One of them was rebuilt on a new site not far away from it earlier site in order to form with one of the two masts, which were not dismantled a directional aerial, while the other was rebuilt at Nierstein in Rhineland-Palatina. On the site of the latter mast a 240-metre-high (790 ft) guyed steel framework mast was erected, which is also insulated against ground. At the construction of this mast, the length of the upper guys were chosen in such way, that there is no disturbation of its radiation pattern when grounded directly at the anchor blocks. So the upper guys do not have any intermediate insulators. They are only insulated toward the mast. However the guys of the lowest level are divided by one intermediate insulator electrically in two parts. ]

In spring 2005 the two 137-metre-high (449 ft) guyed masts which were situated at 48°1′19″N, 9°7′12″E and at 48°1′24″N, 9°7′18″E were demolished.

== Geographical coordinates ==
=== 240 metres ===
- 48°1′18″N 9°7′3″E
- 48°1′19″N 9°7′12″E (dismantled)
- 48°1′24″N 9°7′18″E (dismantled)

=== 244 metres ===
- 48°1′27″N 9°7′2″E

== See also ==
- List of masts
- List of famous transmission sites
