= Beshear =

Beshear is a surname. Notable people with the surname include:

- Andy Beshear (born 1977), current Governor of Kentucky
- Britainy Beshear (born 1979), first lady of Kentucky
- Jane Beshear (born 1946), first lady of Kentucky
- Steve Beshear (born 1944), 61st governor of Kentucky

== Other ==
- Lake Beshear, a lake in Kentucky
