= Jyväskylä TV-mast =

Coordinates: 62°12′25″N 25°38′22″E

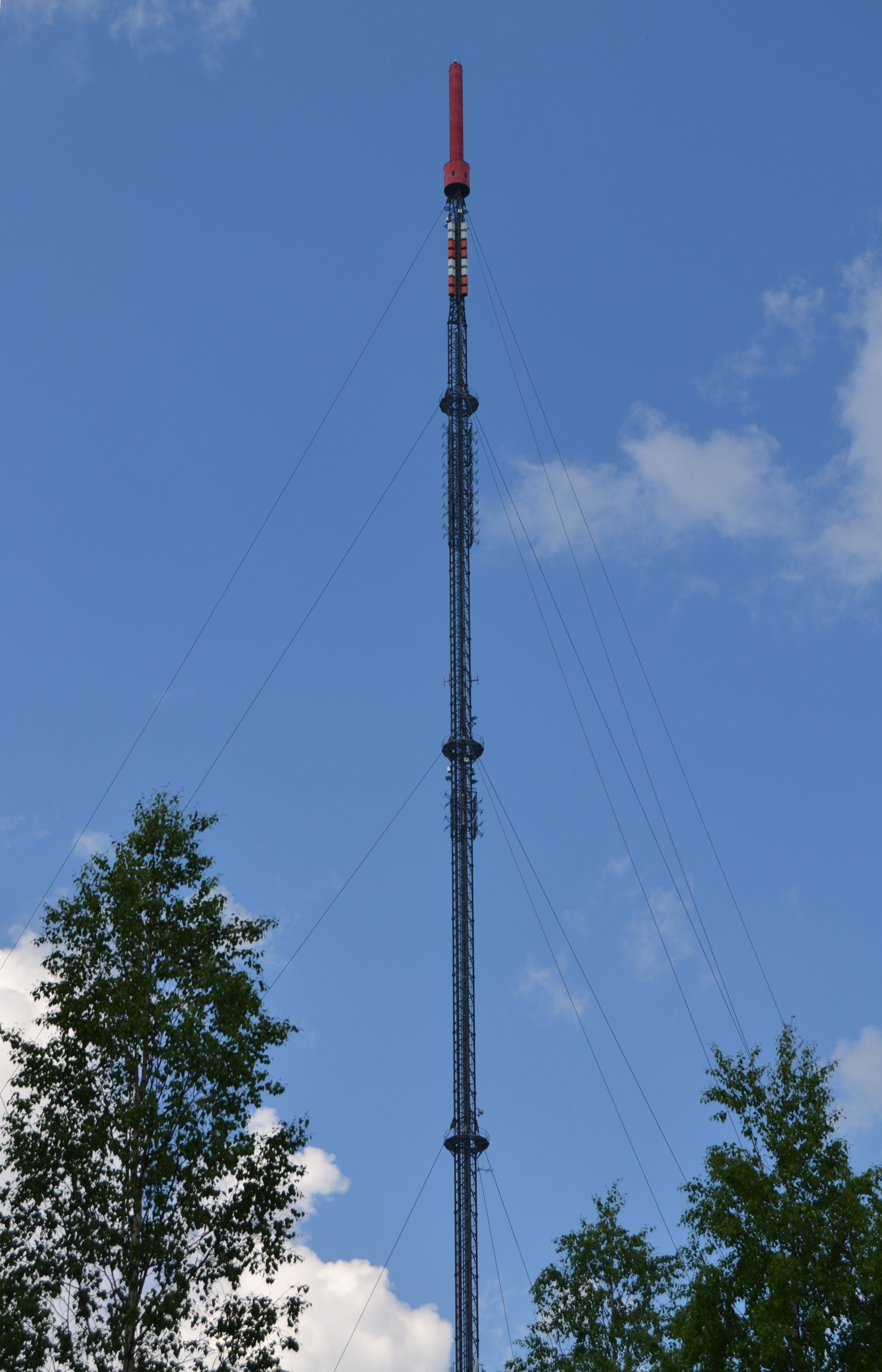
TV-Mast Jyväskylä

Jyväskylä TV-mast is a mast in Taka-Keljo, Jyväskylä, Finland. It has a height of 322 metres (1,056 ft) and it was built in 1994.

== See also ==
- List of tallest structures in Finland

External image
- Lightning striking the mast
