= Lapua Radio and TV-Mast =

Tall structure designed to support antennas

Coordinates: 62°57′20″N 22°57′10″E

Lapua Radio and TV-Mast is a mast in Lapua, Finland. Built in 1961, it has a height of 323 metres (1,060 ft).

== See also ==
- List of tallest structures in Finland
