= Pori transmitter =

Mast in Pori, Finland

Pori transmitter was a transmitter site in Pori, Finland, containing a purpose-built shortwave center and a powerful medium-wave transmitter. It operated on the frequency of 963 kHz with maximum power of 600 kW. The transmitter used a monopole mast radiator with height of 185 metres (607 ft). The transmitters served Finnish speaking listeners in certain parts of Sweden, while also providing popular broadcasts in English. Broadcasts in German and French were also available for a time. The Finnish Broadcasting Company, YLE, transmitted its final broadcasts at the end of 2006 calendar year.

== See also ==
- List of tallest structures in Finland
