= Eurajoki TV Mast =

Radio and television transmission tower

Coordinates: 61°16′52″N 21°41′53″E

Eurajoki TV Mast is a mast in Eurajoki, Finland. It has a height of 321 metres (1,053 ft). It has an elevator to traverse the first 200 metres (660 ft), but the remaining must be climbed without an elevator. Its construction was completed in 1964, with the dedication ceremony taking place on 14 February 1965.

== See also ==
- List of tallest structures in Finland
