= Realtor transmitter =

Medium wave radio transmitter in France

Coordinates: 43.46222°N 5.32568°E

Realtor transmitter was a powerful medium wave transmitter, west of Bassin de Realtor near Cabriès north of Marseille, France. Realtor transmitter is designed for broadcasting on 675 kHz with 600 kW and on 1251 kHz with 150 kW.

Realtor transmitter used as antenna two guyed mast radiators insulated against ground, one with a height of 121 metres at 43.4622235 N 5.3256762 and another with a height of 120 metres at 43.4626927 N 5.319825 E.
