= Sud Radio Transmitter Pic Blanc =

Coordinates: 42°32′5″N 1°43′1″E

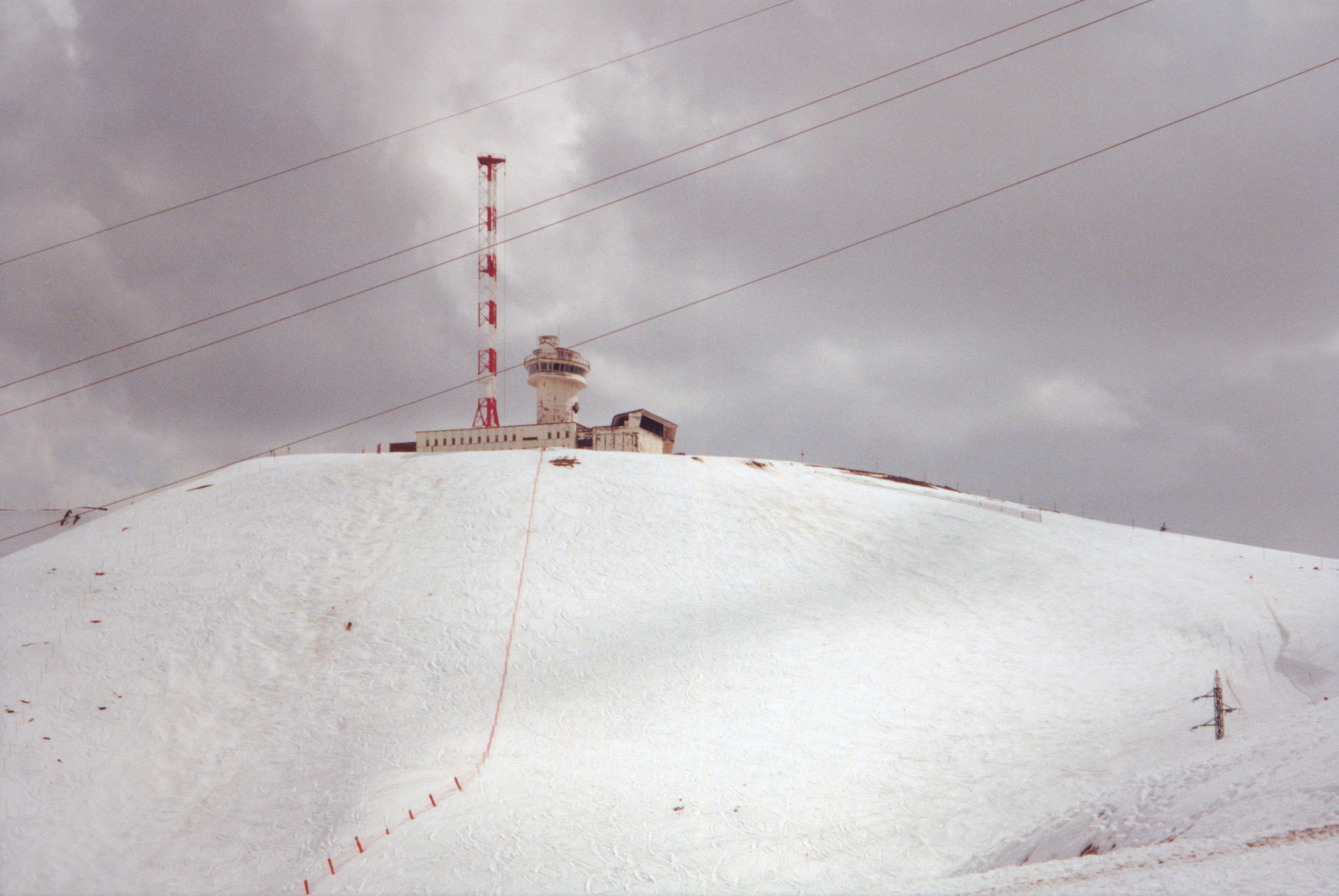
The antenna on top of Pic Blanc in 1993

Sud Radio Transmitter Pic Blanc was a medium wave radio transmitter located in the Principality of Andorra, a small country to the south of France and the north of Spain. The transmitter is located on the mountain of Pic Blanc at 2,650-metre-above (8,690 ft) sea level.

== Sud Radio ==
Sud Radio (meaning South Radio) is a French commercial radio station. It was founded in 1951 as ANDORRADIO S.A. with 51% of the shares being held by Sofirad. The aim was to create a new radio station in Andorra. It started broadcasting on 18 September 1958 and was called Andorradio. On 29 March 1961 an agreement was signed allowing two stations to transmit from Andorra. The station, then called Radio des Vallées d'Andorre ("Radio of the Valleys of Andorra") became Radio des Vallées - Andorra 1 in 1961 and then Sud Radio in 1966.

== The mast ==
Whilst in operation, it was the highest medium wave transmitting station in Europe. It was built in 1972 by Sud Radio and uses a directional antenna consisting of two free-standing 86-metre-tall (282 ft) lattice towers. One of these towers is insulated against ground, while the other one is grounded and carries a cage aerial.

The transmitter worked on 819 kHz with a power of 900 kilowatts. It was shut down in November 1981. As replacement, a small transmitter at Gauré near Toulouse was built.

Now the facility is abandoned and one of the two towers has been partly dismantled.

== See also ==
- List of towers
