= Schlemmin TV Tower =

Coordinates: 53°51′29″N 11°50′15″E

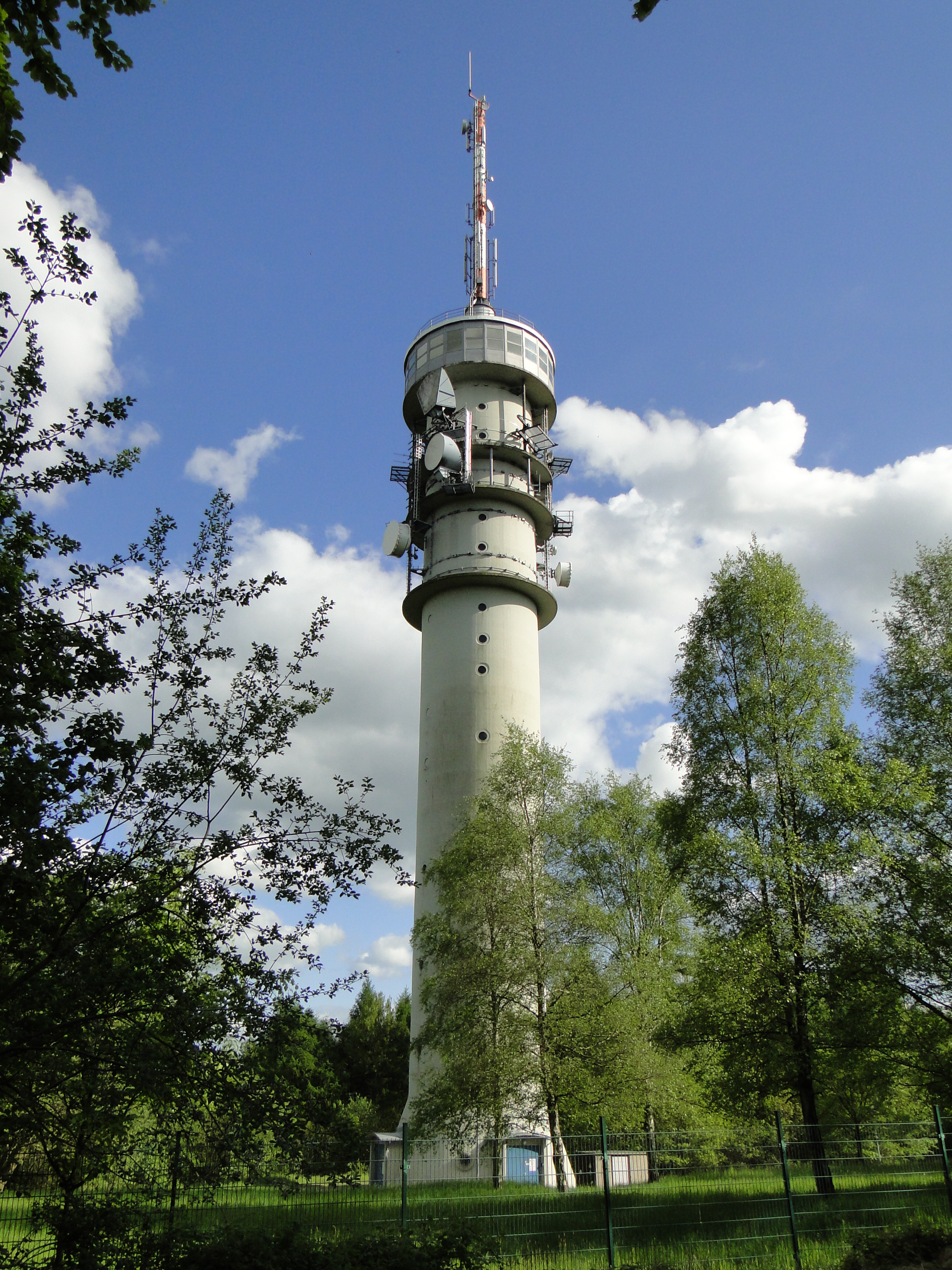
Schlemmin TV Tower

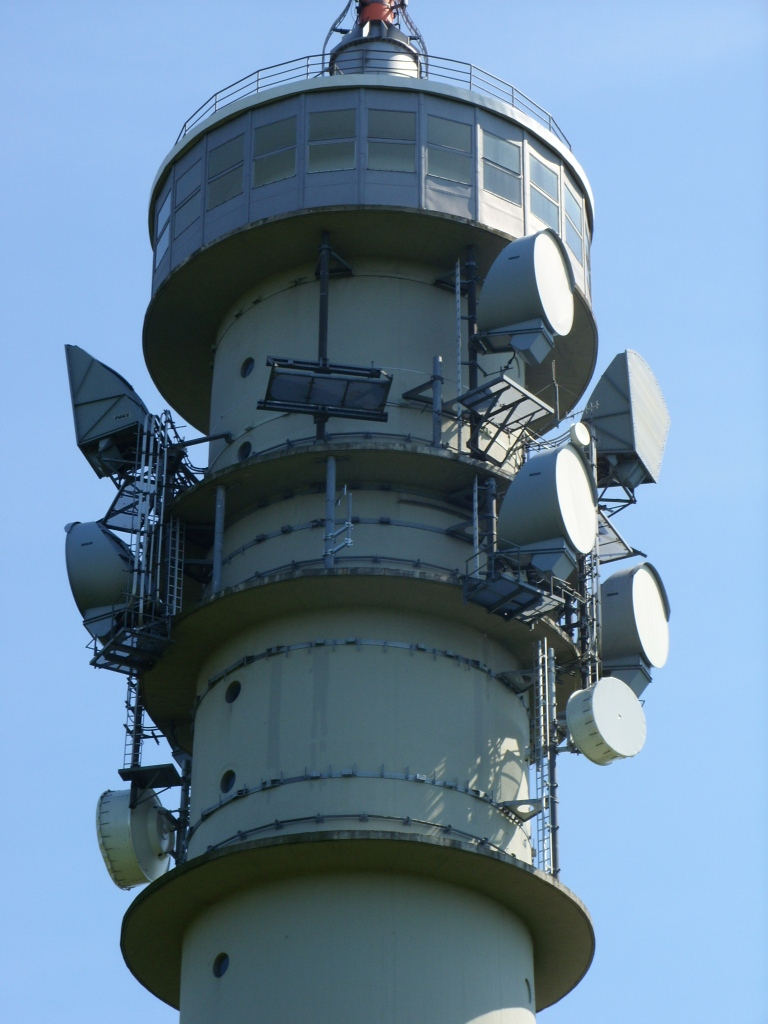
Antennas and closed visitor platform

Schlemmin TV Tower is a TV tower of reinforced concrete southwest of Schlemmin, a village in the municipality of Bernitt in northeastern Germany. The tower was built in 1967. Until 1992 it was equipped with an observation deck and was 64 metres (210 ft) tall. It quickly became a well-known tourist attraction, and so in 1969 an inn was also built at its foot. In 1992, an additional mast for more antennas was added, increasing the total height to 94 metres (308 ft). The tower was closed to the public after these modernization measures; the inn was also demolished.

== See also ==
- List of towers
