= Pasi Jääskeläinen =

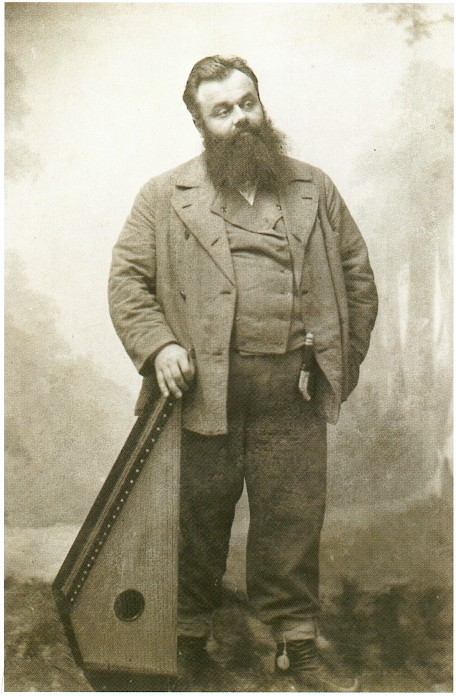
Pasi Jääskeläinen with his Kantele.

Basilius "Pasi" Jääskeläinen (May 30, 1869 – January 23, 1920) was a Finnish actor, singer, playwright and kantele player. He was one of the first recorded Cuplé singers in Finland. In addition he was one of the first artists to produce recordings in Finland, as previously they had been made in places like Saint Petersburg. Jääskeläinen recorded dozens of songs from 1904 until 1911.

== Biography ==
Basilius "Pasi" Jääskeläinen was born on May 30, 1869, in the municipality and town of Haapavesi, Grand Duchy of Finland. Jääskeläinen studied at a private grammar school in Oulu from 1879 until 1882. He then studied the organ and graduated in the year of 1887. In 1902 Jääskeläinen made a trip to the United States in which he entertained the Finnish emigrants. In 1904 and 1905, he made his first recordings in Helsinki and was thus one of the first Finnish artists to make recordings in Finland. Jääskeläinen's recording career lasted until 1911, when he had finished with a total of sixty-four recordings made in Helsinki and Copenhagen. As an actor Jääskeläinen had founded an opera house in Haapavesi. On January 22, 1920, Jääskeläinen departed with his son on a visit to Helsinki. The following day, he died from a stroke.

== Recordings ==
=== November 1904, Helsinki, Finland ===
- Satu ("Kettu ja jänis")/Humalaisen kotiintulo
- Vielä niitä honkia... ("Tukkijoella", Oskar Merikanto, Teuvo Pakkala)
- Tammerkosken sillalla (trad., kantele accompaniment)
- Merimieslaulu (Estonian tune with kantele accompaniment)
- Kekrinä (trad.)
- Lypsäjän laulu (trad.)
- Joen takana (trad.)
- Kun minä laulaan lähden (trad.)
- Suomalainen runosävelmä (trad.)
- Tääll' yksinäni laulelen (trad.)

=== September 1905, Helsinki, Finland ===
- Remma ja remma (trad.)
- Lukkari ja kukko (trad.)
- Varpusen olut (trad.)
- Kultani (trad.)
- Oman kullan silmät (trad.)
- Ja sun hoppati rallallei (trad.)
- Heikki se lähti Heinolasta naimaan (trad.)
- Murrejuttu
- Häälaulu/Paljo olen maata kulkenut (kantele accompaniment)
- Olin minä nuori poika (trad.)
- Varpusen olut/Ompa mulla (trad.)

=== 1906, Helsinki, Finland ===
- Minä olen Matti maailmassa (trad.)
- Minä lähden Ameriikkaan (trad.)
- Kun tätä Suomenmaata... (trad.)
- Enkä minä ryyppää (trad.)
- Stiipeli staapeli stom pom pom (Oskar Merikanto, the song can be considered an adaptation of a folk song)
- Meripoikatte veis
- Kun minä laulaan lähden (trad.)
- Hei henttuni (trad.)
- Rannalla itkijä (trad.)
- Taivas on sininen ja valkoinen (trad.)

=== 1908, Helsinki, Finland ===
- Tämän kylän tytöt (trad.)
- Tule ystäväni rantahan (trad.)
- Hei illalla (trad.)
- Nuku nurmen alla
- Ompa mulla kaunis kulta (trad.)

=== August 1909, Copenhagen ===
- Kahden vaiheilla (Emil Kauppi)
- Tammerkosken sillalla (trad.)
- Varpunen (A.Poppius)
- Humalaisen kotiintulo/Satu
- Piirilaulu (trad.)
- Merimieslaulu (trad.)
- Paimenpojan laulu (trad.)
- Renk' Willen naiminen
- Tuulen henki/Viheriän pellon poikki
- Suomalainen runosävelmä (trad.)
- Kahden vaiheilla (Emil Kauppi)
- Tuntematon

=== September 1910, Helsinki, Finland ===
- Rauma prankori marss' (Hj.Nortamo)
- Kyllä minä tiedän
- Paree oliki' (Emil Kauppi)
- Tukkipoikia tulossa (Emil Kauppi)
- Poika ja tyttö (trad.)
- Kasarmilaulu (trad.)
- Laivakokin rallatus (trad.)

=== September 15, 1911, Helsinki, Finland ===
- Priki Efrosiina – 1 (Axel Törnudd)
- Priki Efrosiina – 2 (Axel Törnudd)
- Jenny
- Aittalaulu (Emil Kauppi)
- Voi niitä aikoja... (Emil Kauppi, Erkki Melartin)
- Vanha juomalaulu (trad.)
- Kotimaani, mukaelma (trad.)
- Heilani kammari (Emil Kauppi)
