= Turku radio and television station =

Coordinates: 60°22′36″N 22°20′05″E

Turku radio and television station is a mast in Kaarina, Finland. It has a height of 319 metres (1,047 ft) and it was built in 1964.

== See also ==
- List of tallest structures in Finland
