= Oulu TV Mast =

Coordinates: 65°02′04″N 025°50′36″E

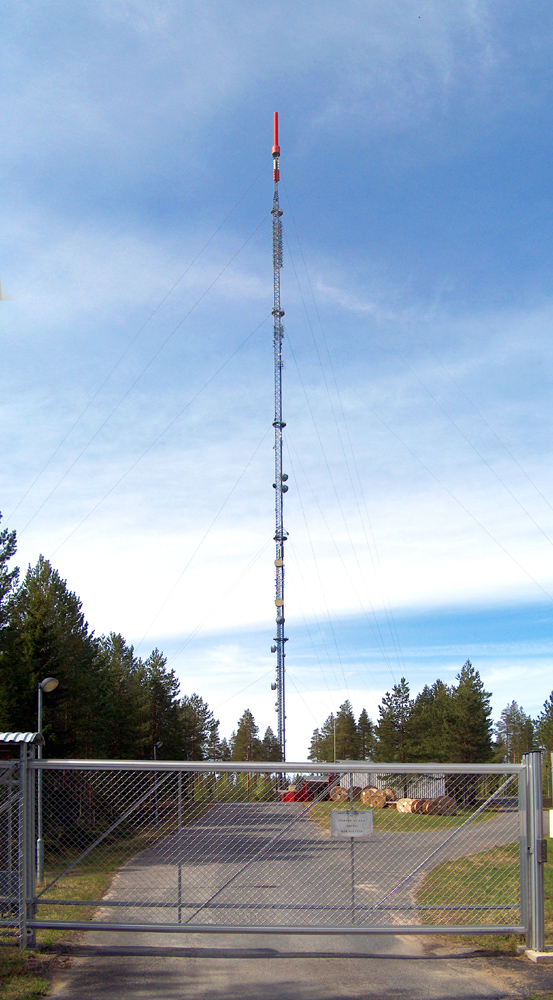
Oulu TV mast

Oulu TV Mast is a mast in the Huttukylä district in Oulu, Finland. The mast is also known as Kiiminki TV Mast, as it is located in the area of the former Kiiminki municipality.

The mast built in 1993 is 326 metres (1,070 ft) tall. It replaced the old Kiiminki TV Mast, which was demolished by explosion in 1994.

== See also ==
- List of tallest structures in Finland
