= Haapavesi =

- Town
- Haapaveden kaupunki
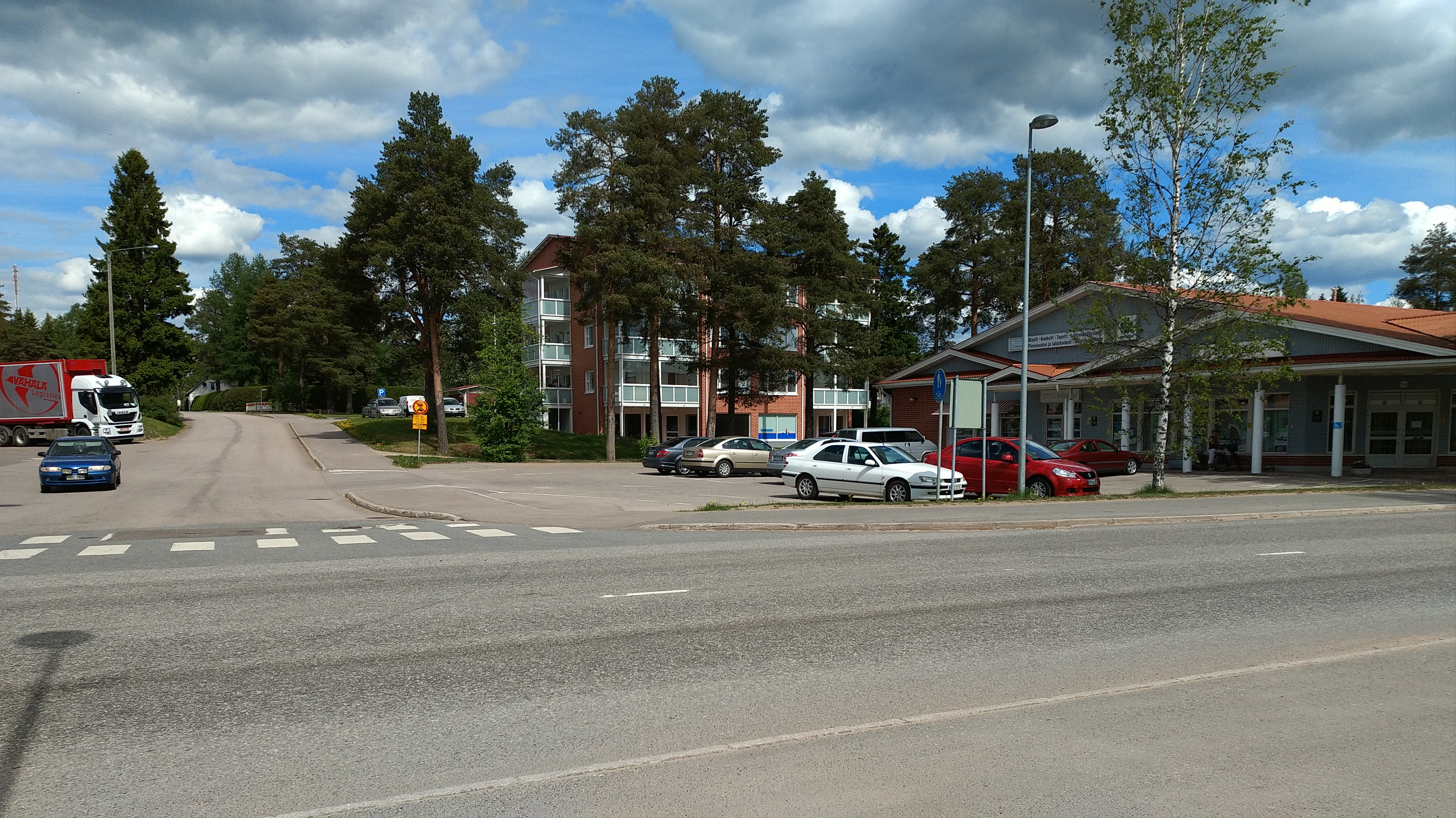

- Coat of arms

- Location of Haapavesi in Finland
- Interactive map of Haapavesi
- Coordinates: 64°08.5′N 025°22′E
- Country: Finland
- Region: North Ostrobothnia
- Sub-region: Siikalatva
- Charter: 1863
- Town privileges: 1996

Government
  - Town manager: Esa Jussila

Area (2018-01-01)
  - Total: 1,086.11 km^{2} (419.35 sq mi)
  - Land: 1,050.47 km^{2} (405.59 sq mi)
  - Water: 36.41 km^{2} (14.06 sq mi)
  - Rank: 75th largest in Finland

Population (2025-12-31)
  - Total: 6,298
  - Rank: 145th largest in Finland
  - Density: 6/km^{2} (16/sq mi)

Population by native language
  - Finnish: 96.2% (official)
  - Others: 3.8%

Population by age
  - 0 to 14: 20.1%
  - 15 to 64: 55.7%
  - 65 or older: 24.3%
- Time zone: UTC+02:00 (EET)
  - Summer (DST): UTC+03:00 (EEST)
- Website: www.haapavesi.fi/en

Haapavesi is a town and a municipality of Finland.

It is located in the North Ostrobothnia region. The name means "Aspen Water". The town has a population of 6,298 (31 December 2025) and covers an area of 1,086.11 square kilometres (419.35 sq mi) of which 36.41 km^{2} (14.06 sq mi) is water. The population density is 6 inhabitants per square kilometre (16/sq mi). Neighbour municipalities are Haapajärvi, Kärsämäki, Nivala, Oulainen, Raahe, Siikalatva and Ylivieska.

The municipality is unilingually Finnish.

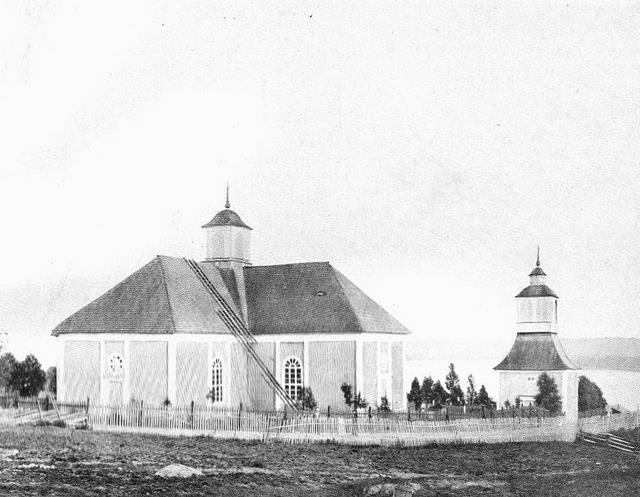
Old church of Haapavesi

The town is the Finnish national kantele village. It is also known for the Haapavesi Folk Music Festival which gathers folk musicians together.

At Haapavesi, there is a 327 metres (1,073 ft) tall guyed TV mast, which belongs to Finland's tallest man-made structures along with the Tiirismaa mast in Hollola.

== Haapavesi Folk High School ==
The Haapavesi Folk High School (Finnish: Haapaveden opisto) is an ideologically independent boarding school. Haapavesi Folk High School is one of the eleven folk high schools cooperating in the HUMAK University of Applied Sciences. HUMAK offers education and training in the fields of Civic and youth work, Cultural management and production as well as Sign language interpreter. In Haapavesi Unit of HUMAK the focus is on civic and youth work.

== Climate ==
Climate data for Haapavesi Mustikkamäki (normals 1991-2020, extremes 1959-present)
Month	Jan	Feb	Mar	Apr	May	Jun	Jul	Aug	Sep	Oct	Nov	Dec	Year
Record high °C (°F)	7.7 (45.9)	8.0 (46.4)	13.5 (56.3)	21.6 (70.9)	29.3 (84.7)	31.3 (88.3)	32.6 (90.7)	30.4 (86.7)	25.3 (77.5)	19.8 (67.6)	10.5 (50.9)	7.2 (45.0)	32.6 (90.7)
Mean maximum °C (°F)	2.5 (36.5)	2.9 (37.2)	7.4 (45.3)	15.7 (60.3)	24.0 (75.2)	26.4 (79.5)	28.1 (82.6)	26.3 (79.3)	20.2 (68.4)	12.4 (54.3)	6.8 (44.2)	3.4 (38.1)	29.1 (84.4)
Mean daily maximum °C (°F)	−5.1 (22.8)	−4.9 (23.2)	0.2 (32.4)	6.6 (43.9)	13.9 (57.0)	18.8 (65.8)	21.6 (70.9)	19.2 (66.6)	13.2 (55.8)	5.5 (41.9)	0.2 (32.4)	−2.9 (26.8)	7.2 (45.0)
Daily mean °C (°F)	−8.2 (17.2)	−8.4 (16.9)	−4.1 (24.6)	1.9 (35.4)	8.4 (47.1)	13.7 (56.7)	16.4 (61.5)	14.1 (57.4)	8.9 (48.0)	2.8 (37.0)	−1.9 (28.6)	−5.5 (22.1)	3.2 (37.7)
Mean daily minimum °C (°F)	−11.7 (10.9)	−12.1 (10.2)	−8.4 (16.9)	−2.7 (27.1)	2.7 (36.9)	8.1 (46.6)	11.2 (52.2)	9.3 (48.7)	5.1 (41.2)	0.3 (32.5)	−4.2 (24.4)	−8.4 (16.9)	−0.9 (30.4)
Mean minimum °C (°F)	−26.3 (−15.3)	−26.2 (−15.2)	−20.4 (−4.7)	−11.9 (10.6)	−4.0 (24.8)	1.0 (33.8)	4.5 (40.1)	2.0 (35.6)	−2.5 (27.5)	−9.6 (14.7)	−15.3 (4.5)	−21.5 (−6.7)	−29.2 (−20.6)
Record low °C (°F)	−39.0 (−38.2)	−41.3 (−42.3)	−31.6 (−24.9)	−21.2 (−6.2)	−9.9 (14.2)	−3.3 (26.1)	−0.4 (31.3)	−3.5 (25.7)	−9.2 (15.4)	−22.7 (−8.9)	−34.3 (−29.7)	−36.2 (−33.2)	−41.3 (−42.3)
Average precipitation mm (inches)	34 (1.3)	28 (1.1)	24 (0.9)	24 (0.9)	44 (1.7)	57 (2.2)	74 (2.9)	68 (2.7)	51 (2.0)	47 (1.9)	41 (1.6)	40 (1.6)	531 (20.9)
Average precipitation days (≥ 1.0 mm)	10	8	7	7	8	10	11	10	9	10	9	10	109
Source 1: FMI normals 1991-2020
Source 2: Record highs and lows

== Notable individuals ==
- Aappo Luomajoki, cross-country skier
- Aapo Heikkilä, investor
- Aarne Ehojoki, architect
- Ahti Pekkala, politician
- Aki Kangasharju, Nordea's chief economist
- Antti Rantonen, traditional kantele musician, father of mixed playing style
- Ari Nurkkala, Mayor of Hyrynsalmi
- Arvo Ojalehto, weightlifter
- Edvard Vähäsarja, Jäger lieutenant
- Eeva Tojkander, poet
- Fanny Friman, poet
- Hannu Karjalainen, artist
- Hans Perttula, minister
- Juha Junno, ice hockey coach
- Juho Ritola, skier
- K.E. Sonck, translator, schoolteacher and writer
- Leevi Karsikas, writer
- Liisa Rentola, teacher and writer (lived in Haapavesi)
- Marko Ritola, sprinter
- Martti Pokela, folk musician and composer
- Matti Koskenkorva, cross-country skier
- Matti Luttinen, politician
- Matti Viinamaa, poet
- Nora Pöyhönen, horticulturist and school director
- Pasi Jääskeläinen, playwright, actor, singer and Kantele-player
- Pauliina Turakka Purhonen, artist
- Sami Niku, ice hockey player
- Sauli Rytky, cross-country skier
- Taavi Törmälehto, Mannerheim Cross knight
- Tapani Niku, cross-country skier
- Tuukka Veikkola, musician alias "Xtrullor"
- Teuvo Hatunen, skier
- Teuvo Karsikas, schoolteacher and writer
- Ville Mattila, cross-country skier and Olympic medalist
- Väinö Karihtala, writer
- Yrjö Komu, politician and Member of Parliament
