= Anjalankoski Radio and TV-Mast =

TV tower in Finland

Coordinates: 60°41′32″N 27°2′47″E

Anjalankoski Radio and TV-Mast is a mast in Kouvola, Finland. It has a height of 318 metres (1,043 ft).

== See also ==
- List of tallest structures in Finland
