= Donje Moštre transmitter =

Broadcasting station in Bosnia

Coordinates: 44°01′30″N 18°08′29″E

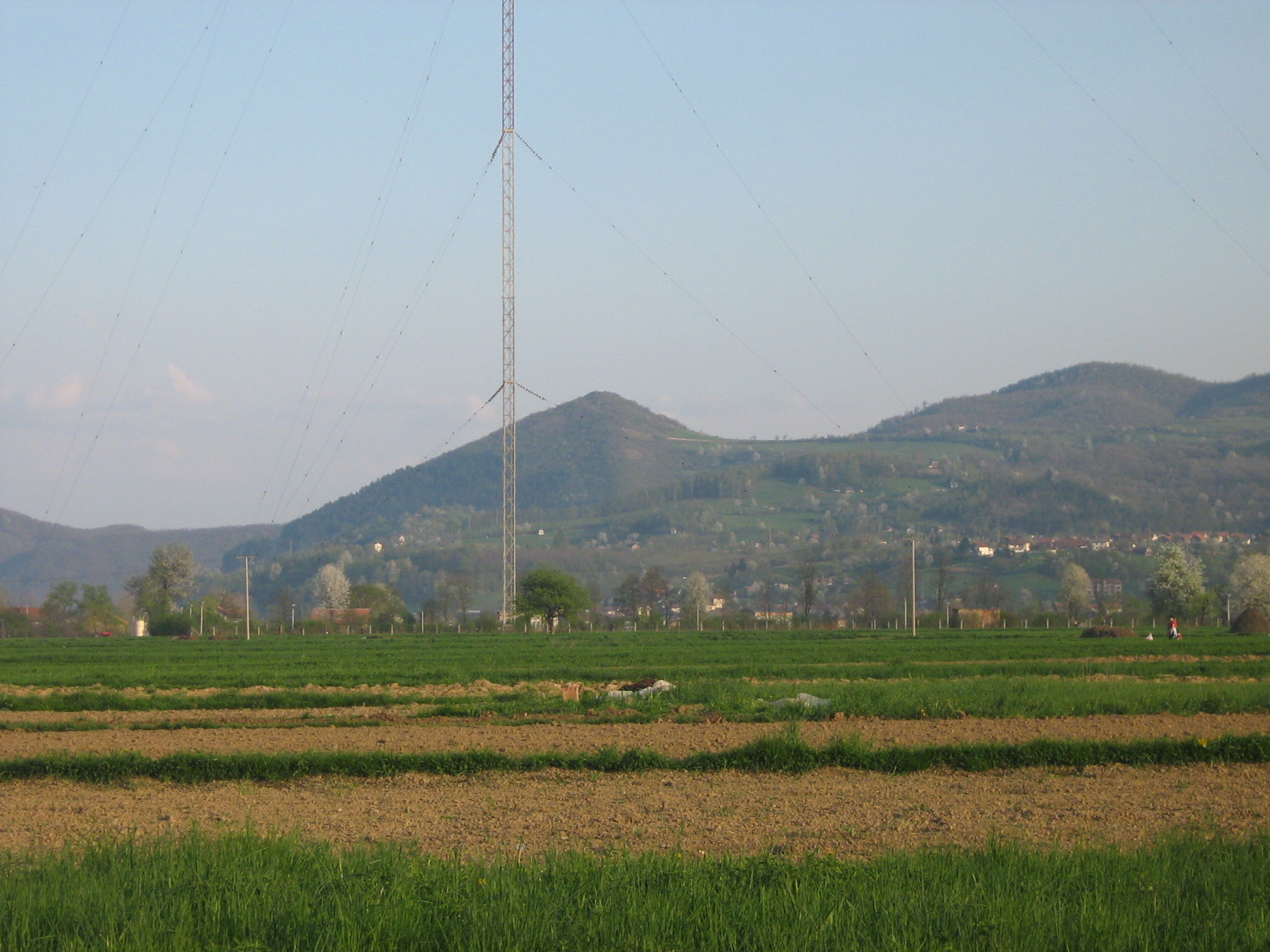
Moštre transmitter

The Donje Moštre transmitter was the most powerful broadcasting station in Bosnia and could be received at night throughout Bosnia on 612 kHz. The transmitter was situated near Moštre, Visoko, 20 kilometres north of Sarajevo. The Moštre transmitter had two mast radiators, the taller of which reached a height of 250 metres and the smaller with a height of 80 metres. It was the highest building in Bosnia and Herzegovina and Ex Yugoslavia. The transmitter was shut down on 30 April 2010 due to cost savings and was dismantled a short time later.
