= Kuopio Radio and TV Mast =

Radio tower in Finland

Coordinates: 62°44′19″N 27°32′29″E

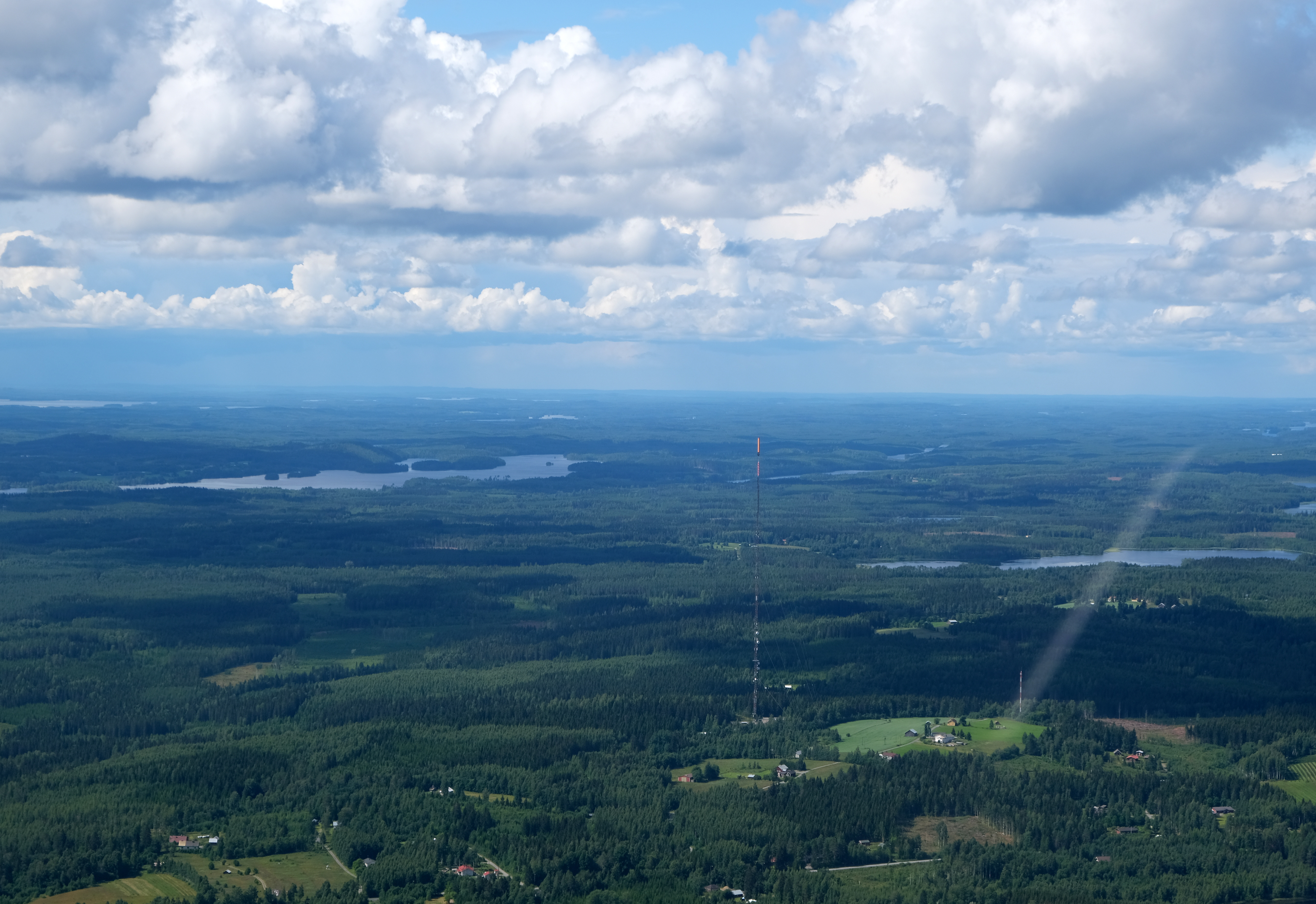
Aerial photo of Kuopio Radio and TV Mast taken in 2022

Kuopio Radio and TV-Mast is a mast in Kuopio, Finland. Construction began on July 24, 1970, and it was completed on October 7, 1970. the tower has a height of 318 metres (1,043 ft).

== Maintenance ==
- On Thursday September 15, 2022 the Kuopio Radio and TV Mast underwent maintenance, leading to a 1.5 hour break on all TV channels and reduced radio capacity. Maintenance similarly affected Varkaus, Pieksämäki, and other surrounding regions.

== See also ==
- List of tallest structures in Finland
