= Sender Feldberg/Black Forest =

The Sender Feldberg/Black Forest (transmitter Black Forest) is a transmission facility for FM and TV in Feldberg, Black Forest, Germany.

The transmitter has an old and a new transmission tower. The old tower was built at 47°51′52″N 8°01′20″E. It is a 75-metre-high (246 ft) concrete tower with an observation deck at a height of 36 metres and a diameter of 9.1 metres. The tower is now closed due to obsolescence.

In 2003, a new 82-metre-tall (269 ft) transmission tower was erected. It stands at 47°52′25″N 8°00′23″E.

== See also ==
List of towers
