= Haapavesi TV Mast =

Coordinates: 64°09′58″N 025°15′39″E

Haapavesi TV Mast is a mast in Haapavesi, Finland. It has a height of 327 metres (1,073 ft), making it the tallest structure in Finland.

== See also ==
- List of tallest structures in Finland
