= Smedsböle Radio Mast =

- Location: Smedsböle, Åland, Finland
- Mast height: 244 metres (801 ft)

Smedsböle Radio Mast is a mast in Smedsböle, Finland. Its tip reaches 244 metres above sea level. It is the highest point in Åland.

== See also ==
- List of tallest structures in Finland
