= Patscherkofel Transmitter =

The Patscherkofel Transmitter is a facility for FM and TV on the mountain Patscherkofel near Innsbruck, Tyrol, Austria. It uses as its antenna a 50-metre high free-standing lattice tower, built in 1958.
