= Tervola Radio and TV-Mast =

Coordinates: 66°07′00″N 24°41′56″E

Tervola Radio and TV-Mast is a mast in Tervola, Finland. It has a height of 302 metres (991 feet).

== See also ==
- List of tallest structures in Finland
