= Stuttgart-Möhringen directional radio tower =

Coordinates: 48°43′35″N 9°08′00″E

The Directional Radio Tower Stuttgart-Möhringen is a 93-metre-high (305 ft) lattice steel tower for directional radio services of the EnBW AG on the area of the substation Stuttgart-Möhringen. The Directional Radio Tower Stuttgart-Möhringen was built in 1975 and is not accessible to the public.

== See also ==
- List of towers
