= Radio and TV Museum (Lahti, Finland) =

Museum in Lahti, Finland

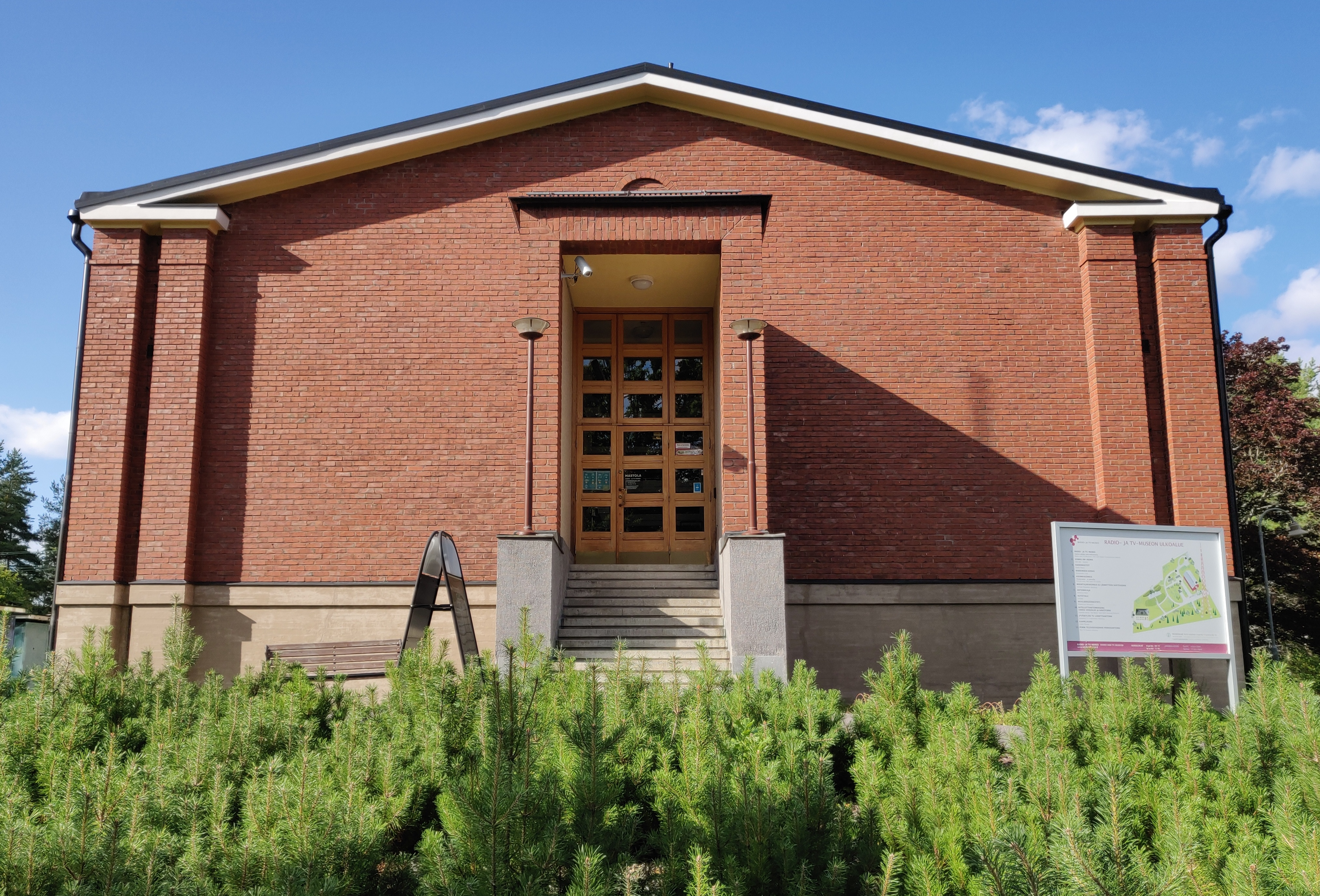
- The main building and the entrance of the Radio and TV Museum.
- Established: 1993
- Location: Radiomäki, Radiomäenkatu 37; 15100 Lahti; Finland
- Coordinates: 60°58′45″N 25°38′55″E
- Type: Technology museum
- Director: Hannu Takala
- Curators: Helena Peippo, Jenni Ahto-Hakonen
- Website: Radio and TV Museum

Radio and TV Museum, also known as Mastola, is a museum located in Lahti, Finland. The museum is near the city centre on the Radiomäki hill (literally translated to Radio Hill). Next to the museum building are two 150-meter-high radio masts built in 1927. The masts are a well-known landmark and a symbol of the city. The museum operates in a radio station building designed by a Finnish architect Kaarlo Könönen and built in 1935.

The Radio and TV Museum was opened in 1993. The museum went through an extensive renovation between the years 2014–2016 and reopened in 2017.

The museum operates under the Lahti City Museum. The Radio and TV Museum collects, researches and exhibits objects related to radio and television especially in Finland. It is a national specialist museum in its field. Visitors can experience old radio and television programmes and see equipment of different eras. The museum also hosts temporary exhibitions, seminars and events.

== Collection ==
The museum collection includes radio and TV receivers, broadcasting studio technology, amateur radio and DX listening devices, Finnish audio recording equipment, radio valves and telephone appliances.
