= Pihtipudas TV Mast =

Coordinates: 63°17′19″N 25°38′50″E

Pihtipudas TV Mast is a mast built in 1952 in Pihtipudas, Finland. It has a height of 321 metres (1,053 ft).

== See also ==
- List of tallest structures in Finland
