= Pasilan linkkitorni =

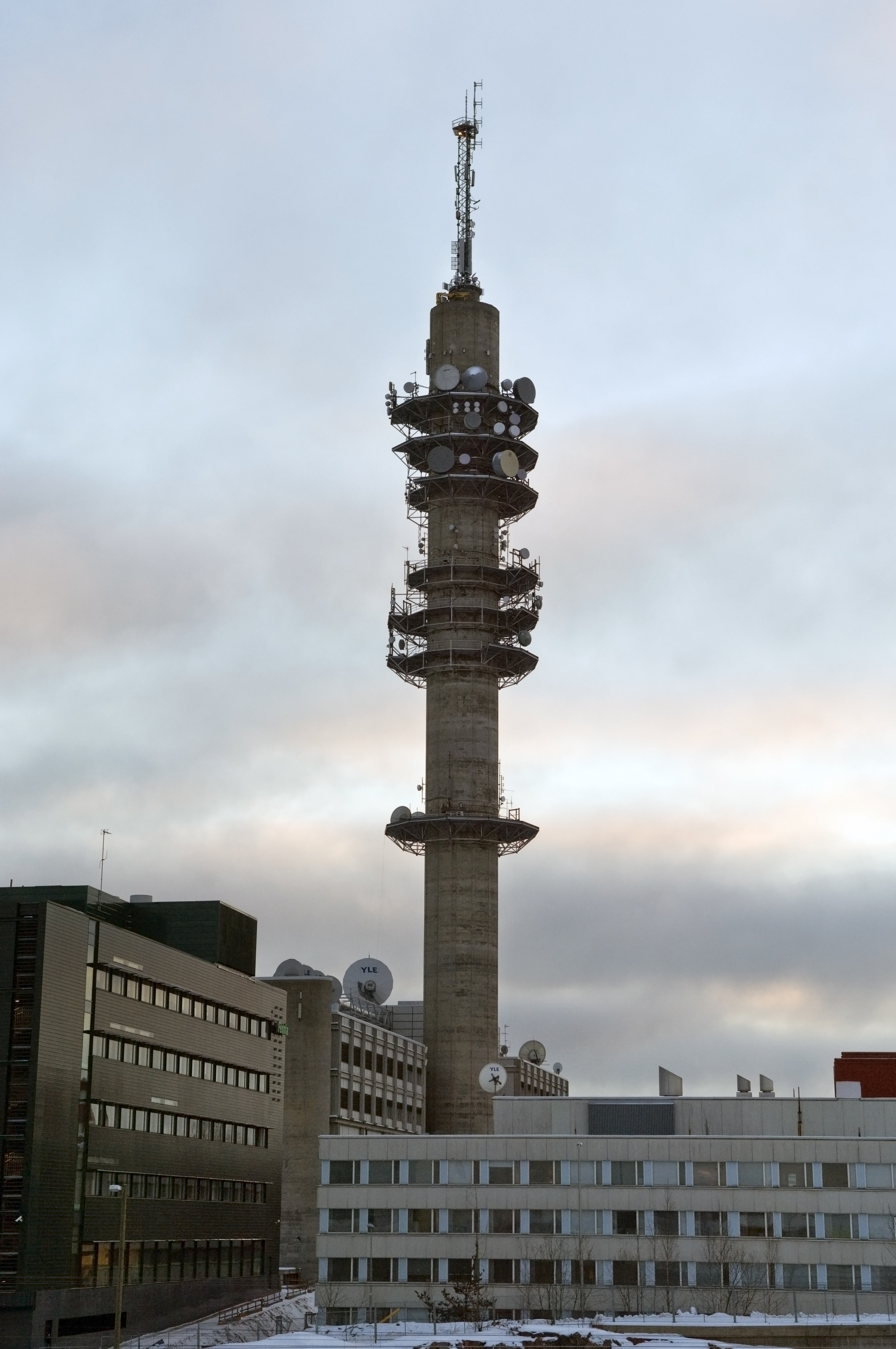
- Interactive map of the Pasilan linkkitorni area

General information
- Type: Communication
- Location: Helsinki, Finland
- Coordinates: 60°12′16.75″N 024°55′24.34″E
- Completed: 1983

Height
- Antenna spire: 146 m (479 ft)
- Top floor: 112 m (367 ft)

Design and construction
- Architect: Mikko Armanto

Pasilan linkkitorni, also known as Yle Transmission Tower, is a 146-metre (479 ft) high TV tower in Pasila, Helsinki. Pasilan linkkitorni was built in 1983 and has at a height of 112 metres (367 ft) rooms with technical equipment. It is the tallest freestanding tower in the Greater Helsinki area and the second tallest in Finland, after Näsinneula in Tampere.

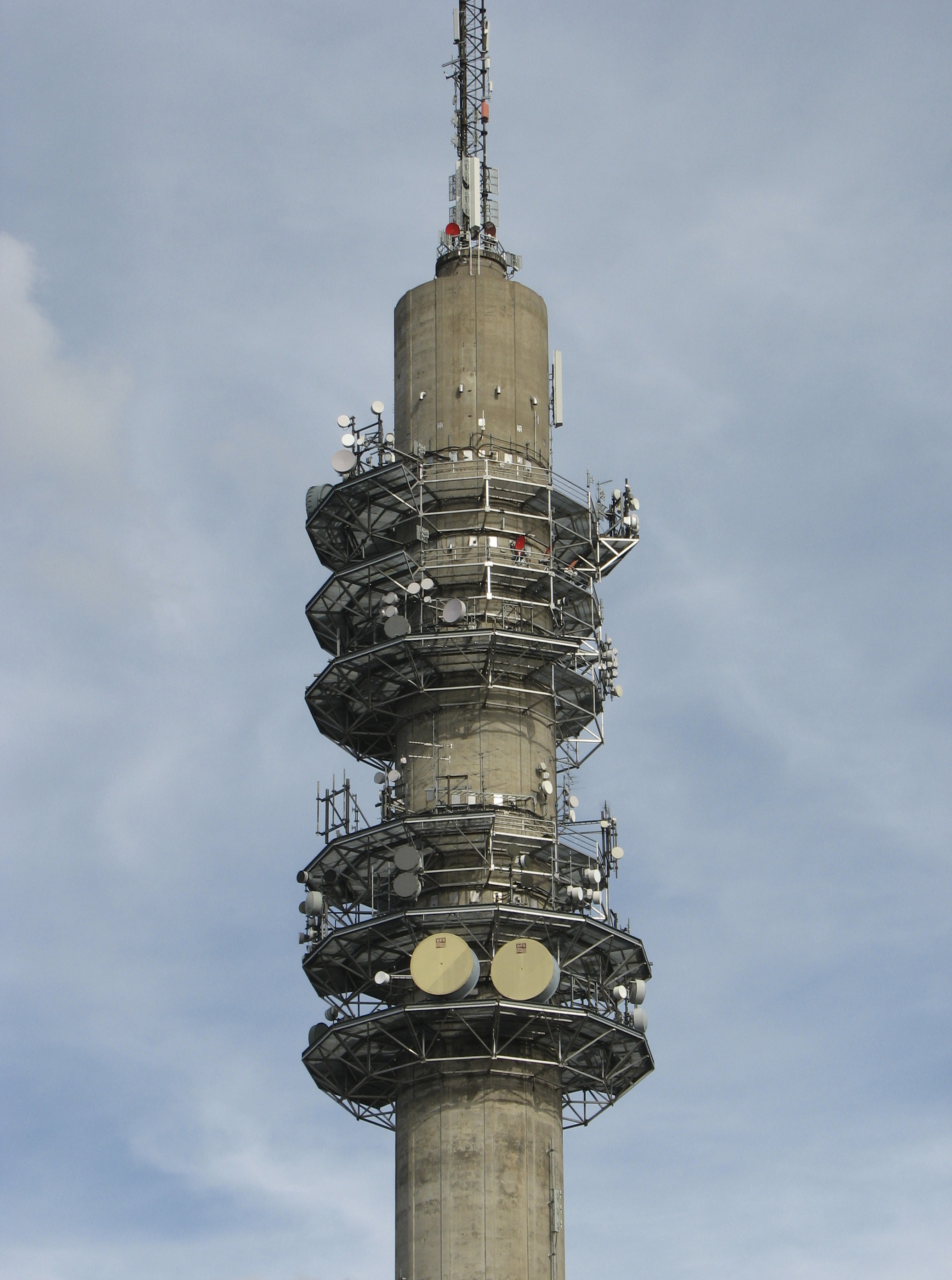
Details of the transmission equipment

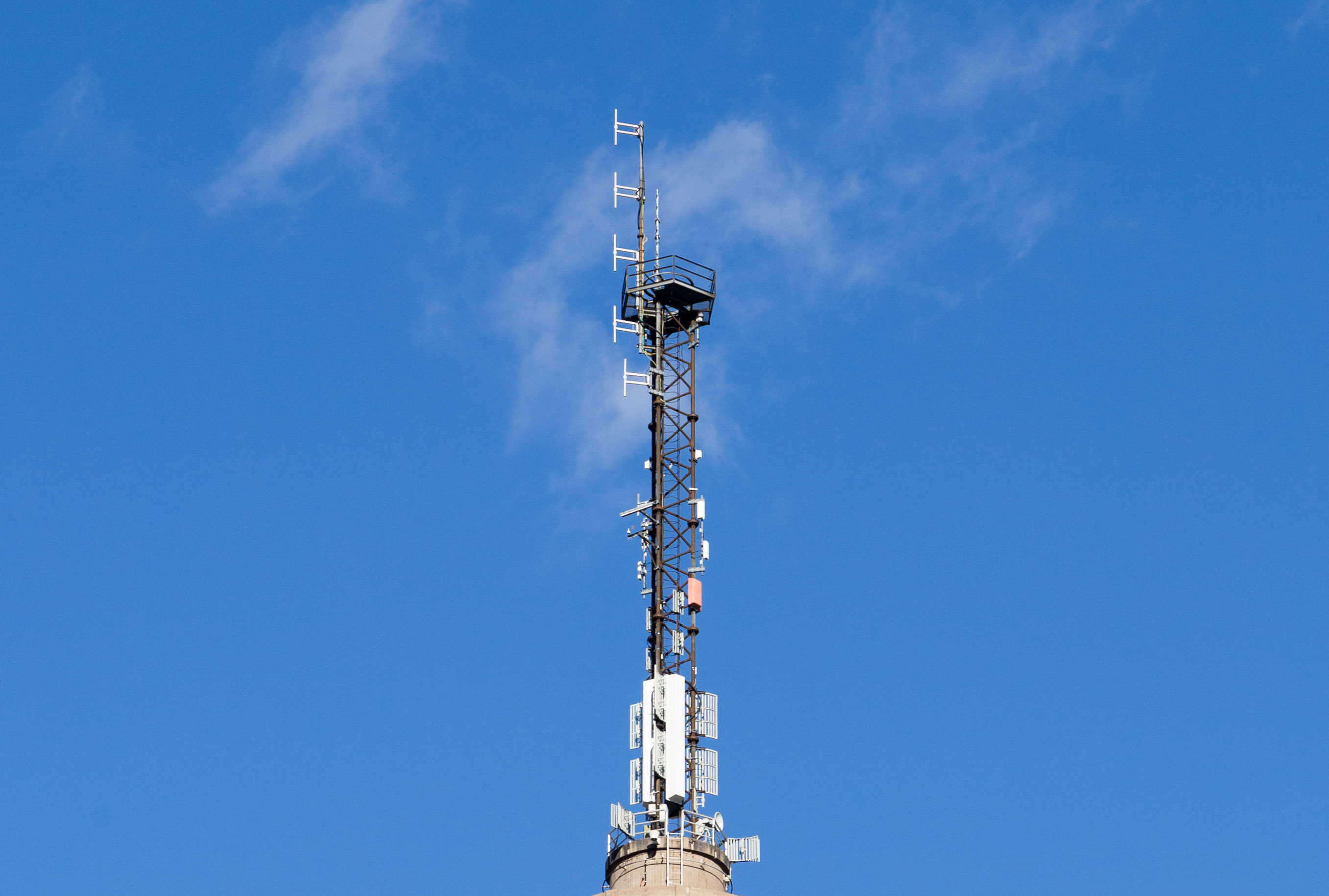
Close-up of the FM antenna mast
