= Lahti longwave transmitter =

Facility for longwave transmission at Lahti, Finland

Coordinates: 60°58′46″N 25°38′49″E

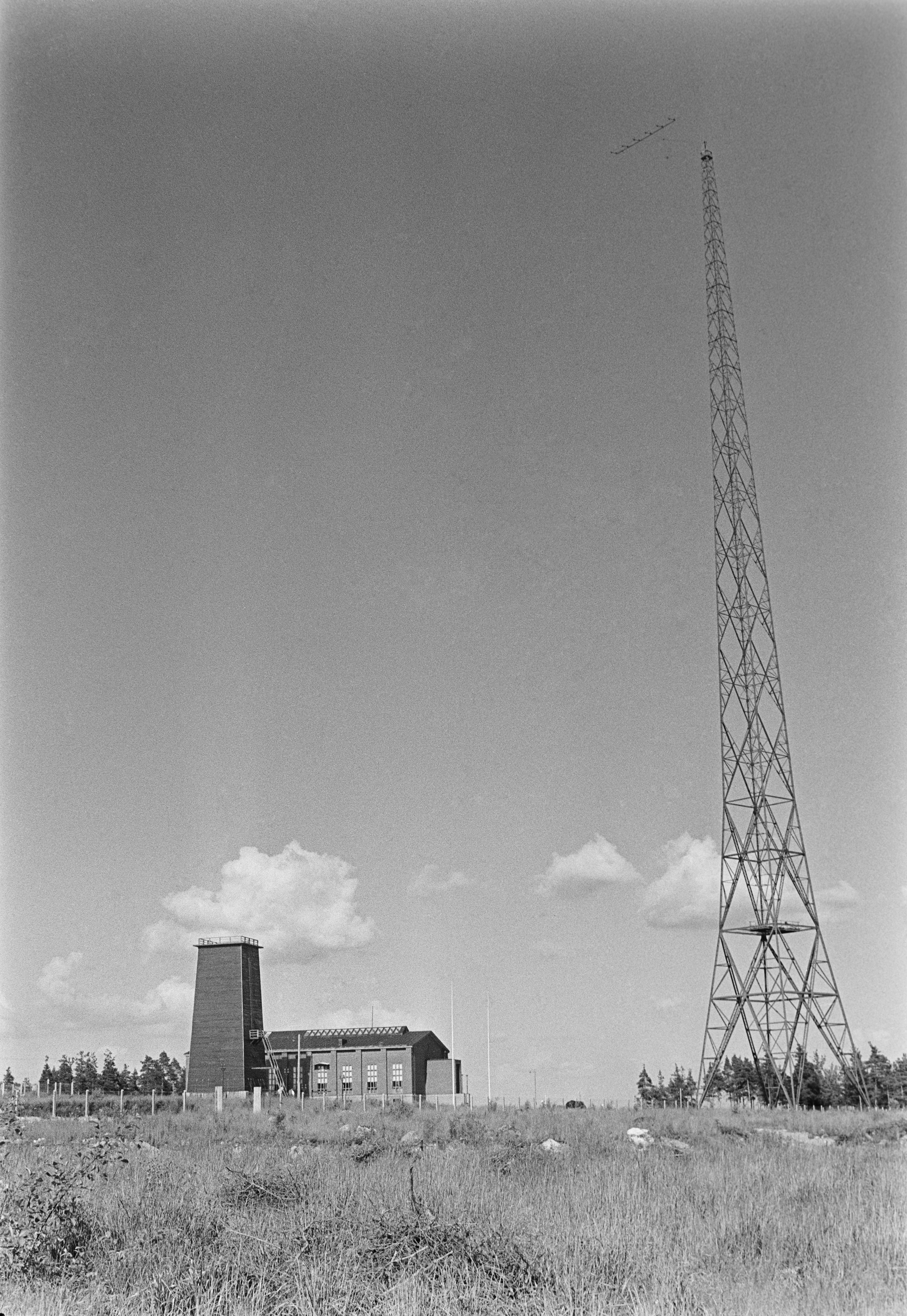
Lahti mast in 1936

The Lahti longwave transmitter was a facility for longwave transmission on a site known as Radio Hill in Lahti, Finland. It used to broadcast on 252 kHz on longwave. The station stopped broadcasting on 31 May 1993.

The station was established in 1927–1928, and operated by the country's public broadcaster, Yle, until its decommissioning in 1993. The station was located here as it is a central location that could cover all of Finland. The first broadcast was 22 April 1928. The Finnish Radio and TV Museum, known as Mastola, is now located on the site, operated as part of the City of Lahti municipal museums.

The station used a T-type aerial strung between two 150-metre-high (490 ft) freestanding steel framework towers. As a highly visible reminder of the radio station, the twin radio masts remain, still 316 metres (1,037 ft) apart, forming a well-known landmark of Lahti.

The station has broadcast on different frequencies. It started on 197 kHz and moved to 167 kHz shortly afterwards. In 1934 it moved again to 166 kHz. In 1939 the Russians broadcast Finnish language propaganda on the same frequency as the transmitter. After World War 2 the frequency changes to 160 kHz and in 1955 to 254 kHz.

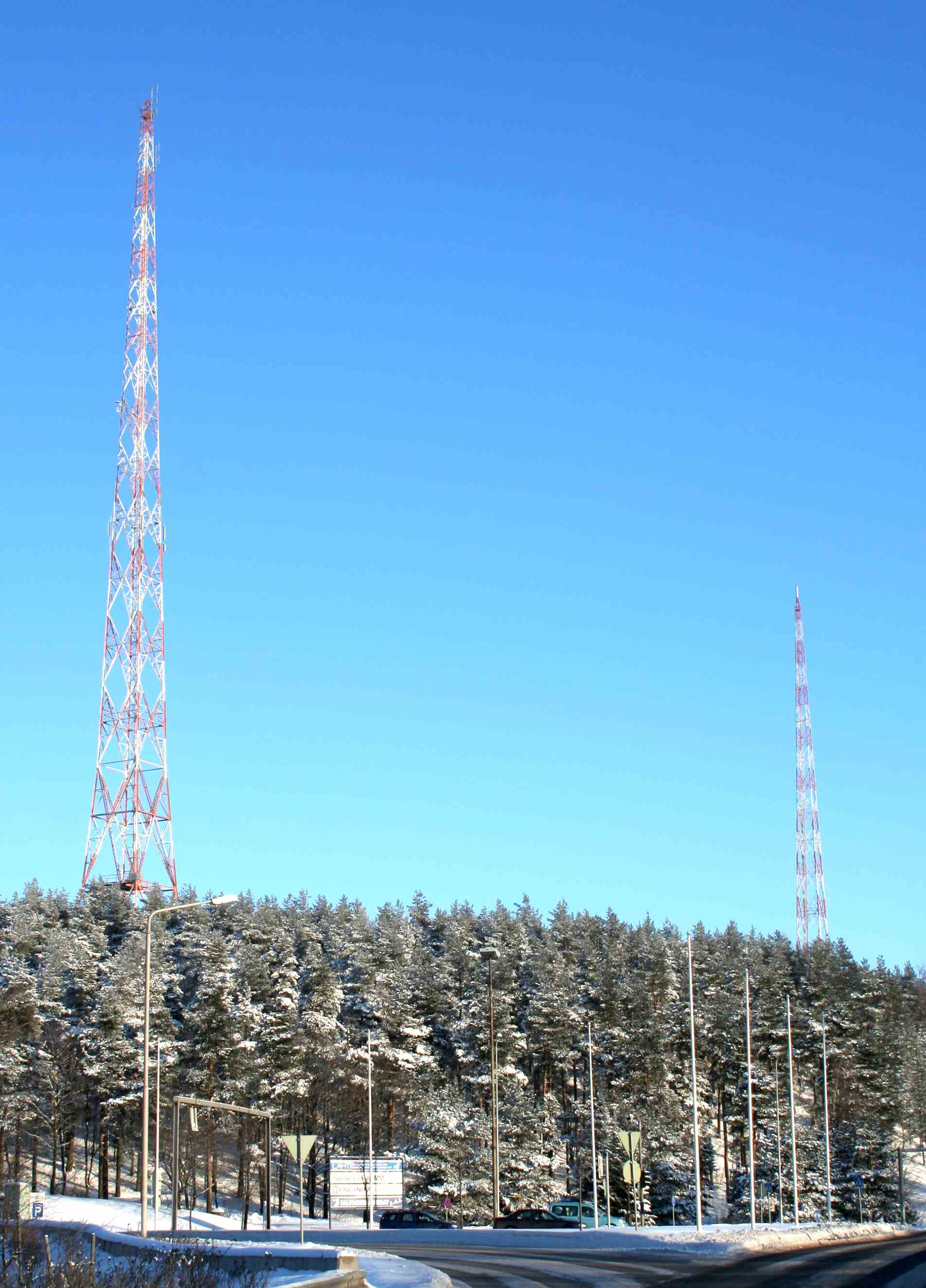
The towers of Lahti longwave transmitter in 2006

The hilltop milieu surrounding the earlier radio station has been designated by the Finnish Heritage Agency as a nationally important built cultural environment (Valtakunnallisesti merkittävä rakennettu kulttuuriympäristö).

== See also ==
- List of towers
