= 549 AM =

AM radio frequency

The following radio stations broadcast on AM frequency 549 kHz:

== Algeria ==
- Jil FM

== Kosovo ==
- RTK Radio Kosova

== Russia ==
- Radio Rossii

== Saudi Arabia ==
- SBA Radio Riyadh
- SBA Radio Al-Azm

== Slovenia ==
- Radio Koper

== Defunct ==
=== Germany ===
- Deutschlandfunk from the Thurnau and Nordkirchen transmitters; both shut down on 31 December 2015

=== Ukraine ===
- Ukrainian Radio from Promin, Mykolaiv Raion, Mykolaiv Oblast; 500 KW transmitter destroyed by Russian Armed Forces in 2022
