= 756 AM =

AM radio frequency

The following radio stations broadcast on AM frequency 756 kHz:

== Algeria ==
- Radio Coran

== China (mainland) ==
- CNR The Voice of China, mainly in Baise, Chizhou, Dongguan, Fuyang, Guangzhou, Haikou, Hanzhong, Harbin, Hebi, Heze, Huangshan, Huzhou, Jieyang, Jinhua, Liupanshui, Longnan, Qingdao, Shaoxing, Shaoyang, Shizuishan, Shuangyashan, Suzhou (Jiangsu), Tai'an, Tianshui, Wuhu, Wuwei, Yan'an, Yichun (Heilongjiang), Zhuhai and Zhumadian

== Egypt ==
- NMA Janub Sa'id Misr

== Iran ==
- IRIB Radio Jahanbin

== Macau ==
- Transfer CNR The Voice of China

== Portugal ==
- RTP Antena 1

== Romania ==
- SRR Radio România Actualitǎți

== South Korea ==
- K News(Beamed to North Korea)

== United Kingdom ==
- BBC Radio Cumbria

== Defunct ==
=== Germany ===
- Deutschlandfunk from the Cremlingen and Ravensburg transmitters; both shut down on 31 December 2015
