= Aholming =

- Municipality
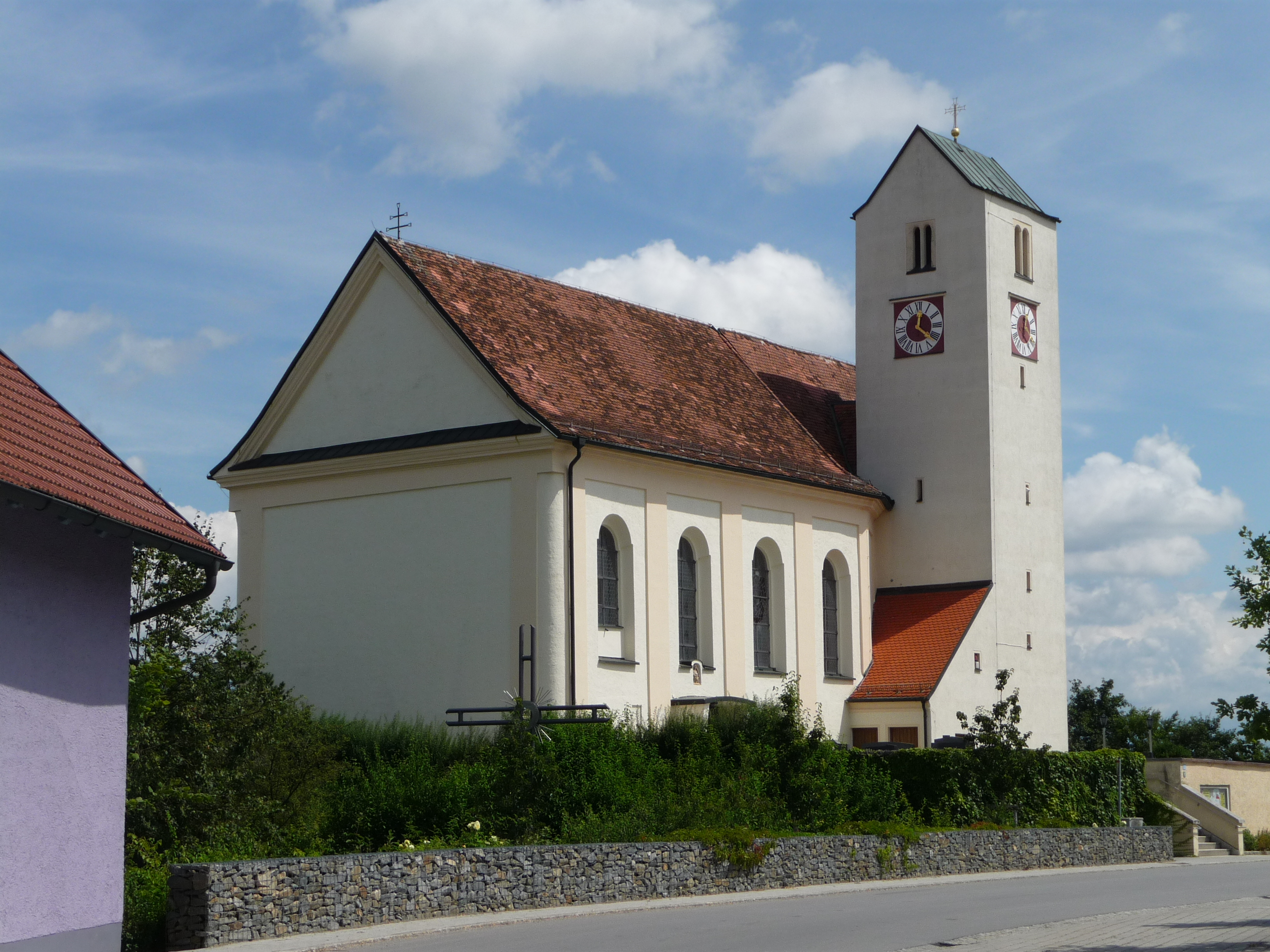
- Church of Saint Stephan

- Coat of arms

- Location of Aholming within Deggendorf district
- Interactive map of Aholming
- Location within Germany Location within Bavaria
- Coordinates: 48°44′N 12°55′E
- Country: Germany
- State: Bavaria
- Admin. region: Niederbayern
- District: Deggendorf
- Subdivisions: 14 Ortsteile

Government
  - Mayor (2020–26): Martin Betzinger

Area
  - Total: 29.35 km^{2} (11.33 sq mi)
- Elevation: 327 m (1,073 ft)

Population (2025-12-31)
  - Total: 2,363
  - Density: 80.51/km^{2} (208.5/sq mi)
- Time zone: UTC+01:00 (CET)
  - Summer (DST): UTC+02:00 (CEST)
- Postal codes: 94527
- Dialling codes: 09938
- Vehicle registration: DEG
- Website: Gemeinde Aholming

Aholming is a municipality in the district of Deggendorf, Germany. Near Aholming there formerly was a long wave transmitter (owned by Media Broadcast until its dismantling) for transmitting the programs of Deutschlandfunk.
