= Bad Dürrheim transmitter =

Coordinates: 48°00′12″N 8°31′28″E

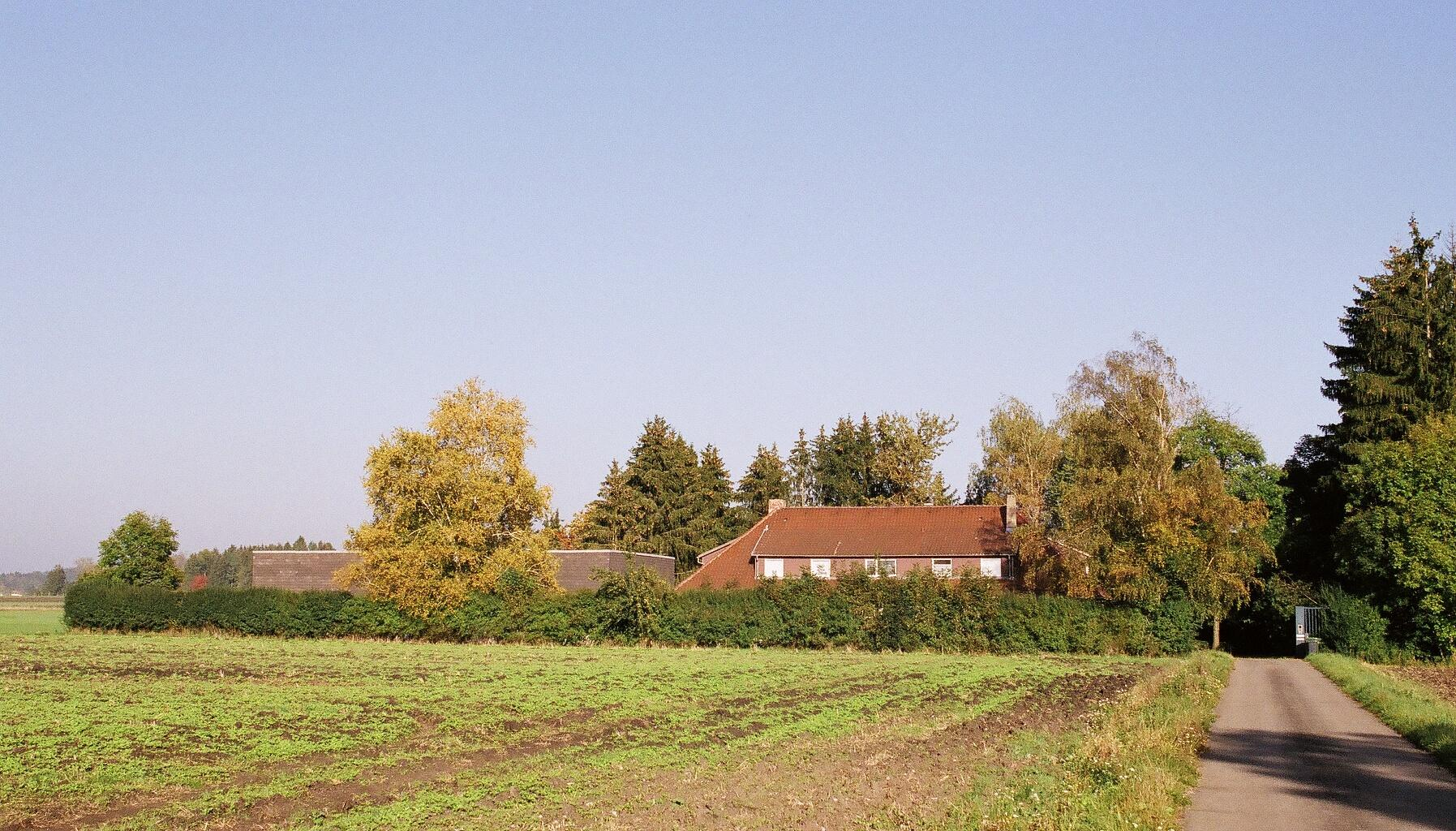
Building of former Bad Dürrheim transmitter

Bad Dürrheim transmitter (German: Sender Bad Dürrheim) was a facility for medium wave and short wave broadcasting at 48°00'12" N and 8°31'28" E at Bad Dürrheim-Ankenbuck. It was built by the Südwestfunk in 1951 and used for mediumwave and shortwave broadcasting. Regarding the transmission antenna for mediumwave, a 120-metre-tall (390 ft) guyed mast, which was insulated against ground was used. For the shortwave transmissions a 12-metre-tall (39 ft) mast with a diameter of 4 metres was used. In 1962 the facility was given to German Federal Post (Deutsche Bundespost) in order to use it for transmitting the program of Deutschlandfunk. These days the shortwave transmissions of Bad Dürrheim transmitter have been moved to Bodenseesender.

Because the program of Deutschlandfunk could be also received well by Ravensburg-Horgenzell transmitter in the area, which Bad Dürrheim transmitter served, it was shut down after the wave plan of Geneva came into force in 1978, where no frequency was applied for it.

By 2006, the antennas of the Bad Dürrheim transmitter were dismantled.
