= Cremlingen transmitter =

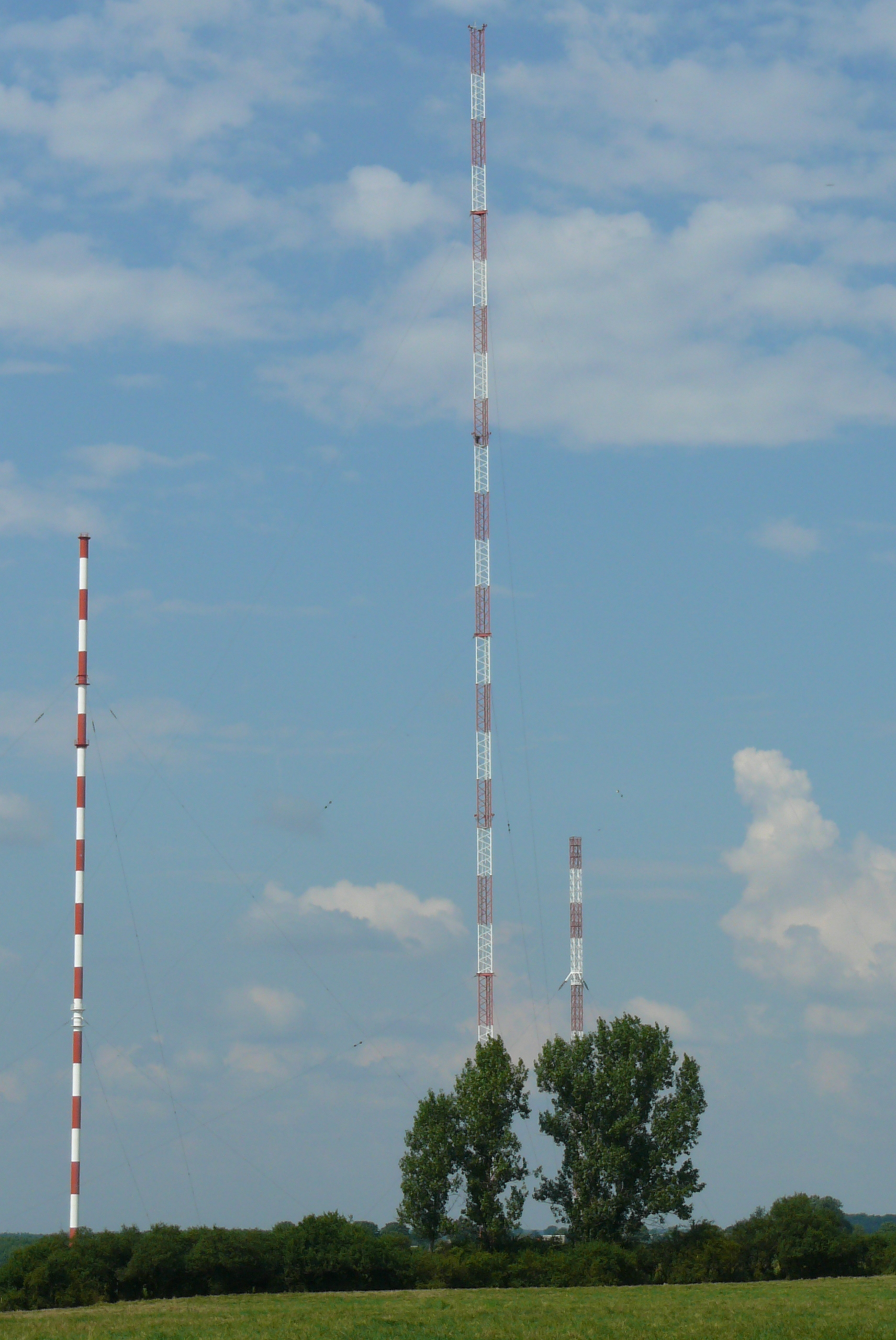
- Cremlingen transmitter
- Location: Cremlingen-Abbenrode
- Mast height: 137 m (449 ft)
- Coordinates: 52°17′38″N 10°43′36″E
- Built: 1962

The Cremlingen transmitter is a large mediumwave transmission facility established in 1962 for transmitting the programme of Deutschlandfunk on 756 kHz near Cremlingen-Abbenrode. It was also known as Sender Braunschweig or Sender Königslutter.

The first transmitter was installed in 1962. It transmitted the program of Deutschlandfunk on 755 kHz (756 kHz from 1978 on) at a power of 100 kW and used as its aerial a 137-metre-high guyed steel framework mast. The transmitter power was raised to 200 kW one year later, but it only operated during daytime for some time. Interferences with the Ravensburg mediumwave transmitter which worked on the same frequency were common.

A second transmitter was installed for the transmission of the Deutschlandfunk programme on 548 kHz from 28 October 1963, initially with a power of 200 kW. It used a 240-metre-high guyed steel tube mast as its aerial, which was insulated against the ground, A second, insulated guyed steel framework mast was installed to shape the radiation pattern with a minimum towards the southeast, in order to avoid interferences with Radio Mayak in the Soviet Union.

On 1 October 1967 the transmission power on 548 kHz was raised to 800 kW (400 kW during nighttime), sufficient to reach all of the northern Federal Republic of Germany and most of the territory of the GDR.

According to the Geneva Frequency Plan of 1975 which came into effect in November 1978, transmissions on 548 kHz ceased in favour of Thurnau transmitter which started to transmit at this time on 549 kHz with 200 kW, and Nordkirchen transmitter on the same frequency with 100 kW. Both transmitters at Cremlingen were converted to combined operation at 756 kHz with a maximum daytime power of 800 kilowatts, and 200 kilowatts with a radiation minimum towards the southeast during the night. The height of the steel tube mast was reduced from 240 metres to 199 metres to optimize it for 756 kHz. Likewise, the steel framework mast used to for directional purposes was shortened to 99 m. The height of the 137-metre mast was not changed, it was used after 1978 as a backup aerial.

The 800 kW vacuum tube transmitters have been dismantled, and since the middle of the 1990s the transmitter power has been 200 kW all day, provided by two 100 kW transmitters. In 2005, a fully transistorised and DRM capable 800 kW transmitter station was installed.

From 2001 to 2003 the program of the pop music radio MEGARADIO was transmitted using the backup station on 630 kHz and the 137-metre-high radio mast as the aerial. This was made possible after this frequency, which had been used from 1978 until the mid-1990s for transmissions of SFB and NDR on 630 kHz from the Dannenberg transmitter in the daytime, had been re-coordinated for 24-hour transmission from the Cremlingen transmitter.

From 1 April 2005 until 2 January 2013, the program of Voice of Russia was transmitted from Cremlingen on 630 kHz. Switch-off was planned for 31 December 2012, but a technical fault caused transmissions to continue until 2 January 2013.

The last programme to be transmitted from this station was that of Deutschlandradio. Transmissions ceased on 31 December 2015. All masts have been demolished.

== See also ==
- List of tallest structures
