= Aholming transmitter =

Demolished German radio tower

Coordinates: 48°43′48″N 12°55′53″E

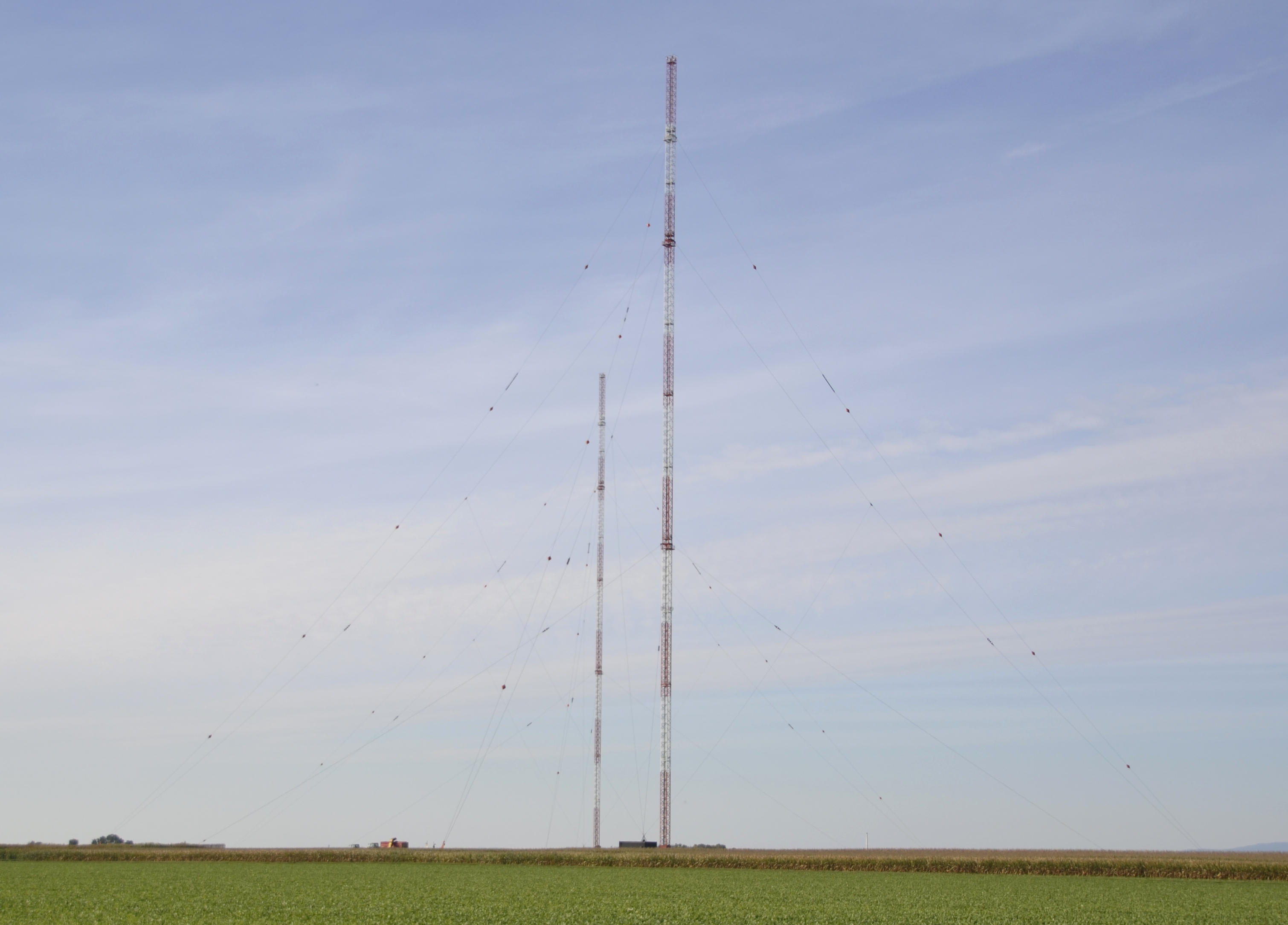
Aholming transmitter

Aholming transmitter was a facility for formerly broadcasting the Program of Deutschlandfunk on 207 kHz with a power of 500 kW at day and 250 kW at night between Aholming and Ottmaring in Bavaria. It was (finally) shut down in the early Morning hours of January 1, 2015. It was demolished in 2018.

The Aholming Transmitter, which could be received in most parts of Europe, was built between 1986 and 1988 as a Replacement for the older Erching transmitter. This became necessary as the Nighttime Operation on 207 kHz requires, according to the Geneva Frequency Plan a directional Radiation Pattern for whose Realization a second Mast was required. This Mast could not be built on the site of the former Erching, as it had to be cleared from tall Structures as in its Proximity the new Airport of Munich was under construction.

The Aholming Transmitter, which entered into service on January 1, 1989, uses a directional antenna consisting of two grounded masts, which are guyed at three levels 101, 203 and 239 metres above Ground. Over the guy level, which is fixed with the Mast in a Height of 203 metres, the Transmission Power was fed into each Mast.

Therefore, from the Top of the helix building close to the mast three conductor ropes ran upward to a point of the 203 metre guy level, which was situated 110 metre away from its anchor point of the Mast.

Both Masts, which were equipped in 6 levels with flight safety Lamps were nearly of the same height to wavelength ratio as those of Sender Donebach (0.1829). The distance between them was 483 metres.

During Daytime, the directional Pattern of Aholming transmitter showed only a slight maximum toward Northwest and Southeast.

At Nighttime, when Transmission Power was to be reduced to 250 kW and much further suppressed into the East, to not interfere with a former Transmitter being operated at Kiev on the same Frequency, both Masts were fed with a Phase Shift of 117°. By this Measure, a strong Directional Radiation Pattern occurs with a Power Reduction to 2.5 kW in Azimuth ranges between 72 and 88°, 130 kW in azimuth range between 115 and 160° and 100 kW between 160 and 230°.

The Transmitter Building of Aholming transmitter is 420 metres away from both Masts. It has an area of 1300 m*m and a volume of 6725 m*m*m. The Transmitter consists of 2 250 kW-units, which are mostly identical to the devices used at Sender Donebach. They have used dynamic Amplitude Modulation, which was generated by using pulse-width Modulation, a technique also used in modern static inverters to efficiently save Energy for Transmission.
