= Rümelin =

Rümelin, Ruemelin or Rumelin is a German surname. Notable people with the surname include:

- Gustav Rümelin (1815–1889), German statistician, pedagogue and author
- Julian Nida-Rümelin (born 1954), German philosopher and public intellectual
- Martine Nida-Rümelin (born 1957), German philosopher
