= Ravensburg =

- Town
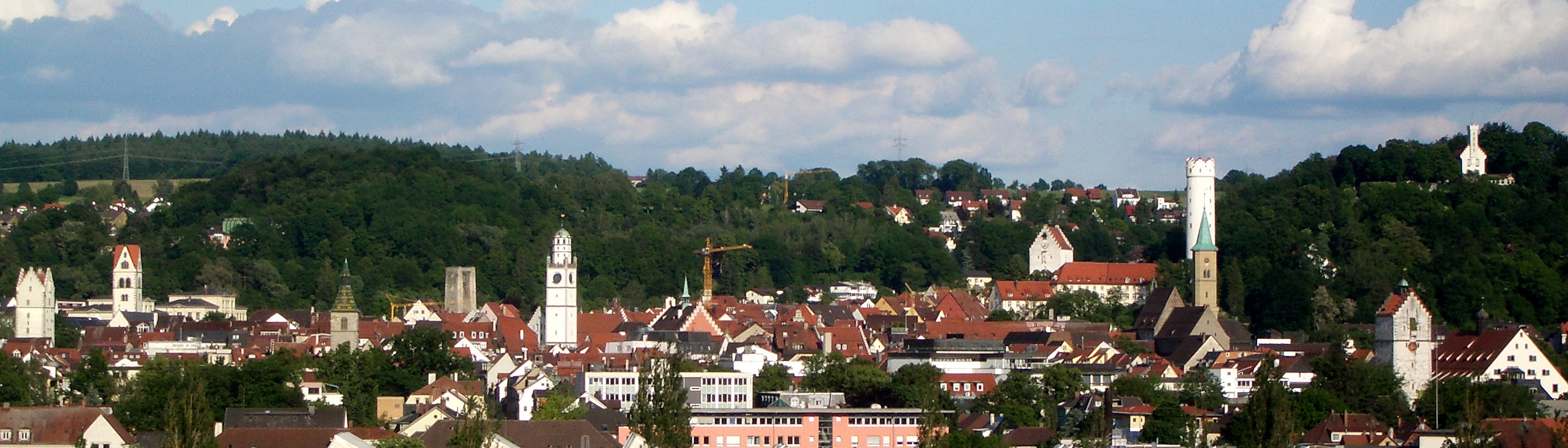
- Ravensburg, seen from the west

- Flag Coat of arms

- Location of Ravensburg within Ravensburg district
- Interactive map of Ravensburg
- Location within Germany Location within Baden-Württemberg
- Coordinates: 47°46′59″N 9°36′41″E
- Country: Germany
- State: Baden-Württemberg
- Admin. region: Tübingen
- District: Ravensburg
- Municipal assoc.: Mittleres Schussental

Government
  - Mayor (2018–26): Daniel Rapp (CDU)

Area
  - Total: 92.05 km^{2} (35.54 sq mi)
- Elevation: 450 m (1,480 ft)

Population (2025-12-31)
  - Total: 50,549
  - Density: 549.1/km^{2} (1,422/sq mi)
- Time zone: UTC+01:00 (CET)
  - Summer (DST): UTC+02:00 (CEST)
- Postal codes: 88212–88214
- Dialling codes: 0751
- Vehicle registration: RV
- Website: www.ravensburg.de

Ravensburg (German pronunciation: [ˈʁaːvn̩sˌbʊʁk] or [ˈʁaːfn̩sˌbʊʁk]; Swabian: Raveschburg) is a city in Upper Swabia in Southern Germany, capital of the district of Ravensburg, Baden-Württemberg.

Ravensburg was first mentioned in 1088. In the Middle Ages, it was a Free Imperial City and an important trading centre. The "Great Ravensburg Trading Society" (Große Ravensburger Handelsgesellschaft) owned shops and trading companies all over Europe.

The historic city centre is still very much intact, including three city gates and over 10 towers of the medieval fortification.

== History ==
The city of Ravensburg is situated at a ford in the river Schussen along the trade route between the Danube and Lake Constance. A castle known by the Franconian name Rauenspurg was founded on a spur overlooking the valley by the Welfs, a Frankish dynasty in Swabia at some point in the first half of the eleventh century. In the middle of the century, the Welfs relocated their court to the Ravensburg castle, making it their ancestoral seat, and a town had developed in its shadow.

The town is first mentioned in writing in 1088. After razing the town of Augsburg to the ground, the Historia Welforum records that Welf IV took its bishop captive, transporting him to Ravensburg where he held him for ransom.

A fire in 1131 burned the town the ground during the campaign of Frederick II Duke of Swabia. However, it was quickly rebuilt and by 1138, it is described as being enclosed by a wall. A market is mentioned as being part of the town for the first time in 1152.

The male Welf line expired with the death of Welf VI, Duke of Spoleto in 1191. By means of a contract of inheritance, the castle and town passed into the possession of the Hohenstaufen, Frederick Barbarossa. But with the death of Conradin in 1268 in Naples, the Hohenstaufen line became extinct, and their former estates became the imperial property of the Holy Roman Empire. In June 1276, Emperor Rudolf I issued the town a privilege granting it the status of an Imperial Free City. Ten years later, the emperor confirmed the privilege, adding the right for the city to hold a grain market every Saturday.

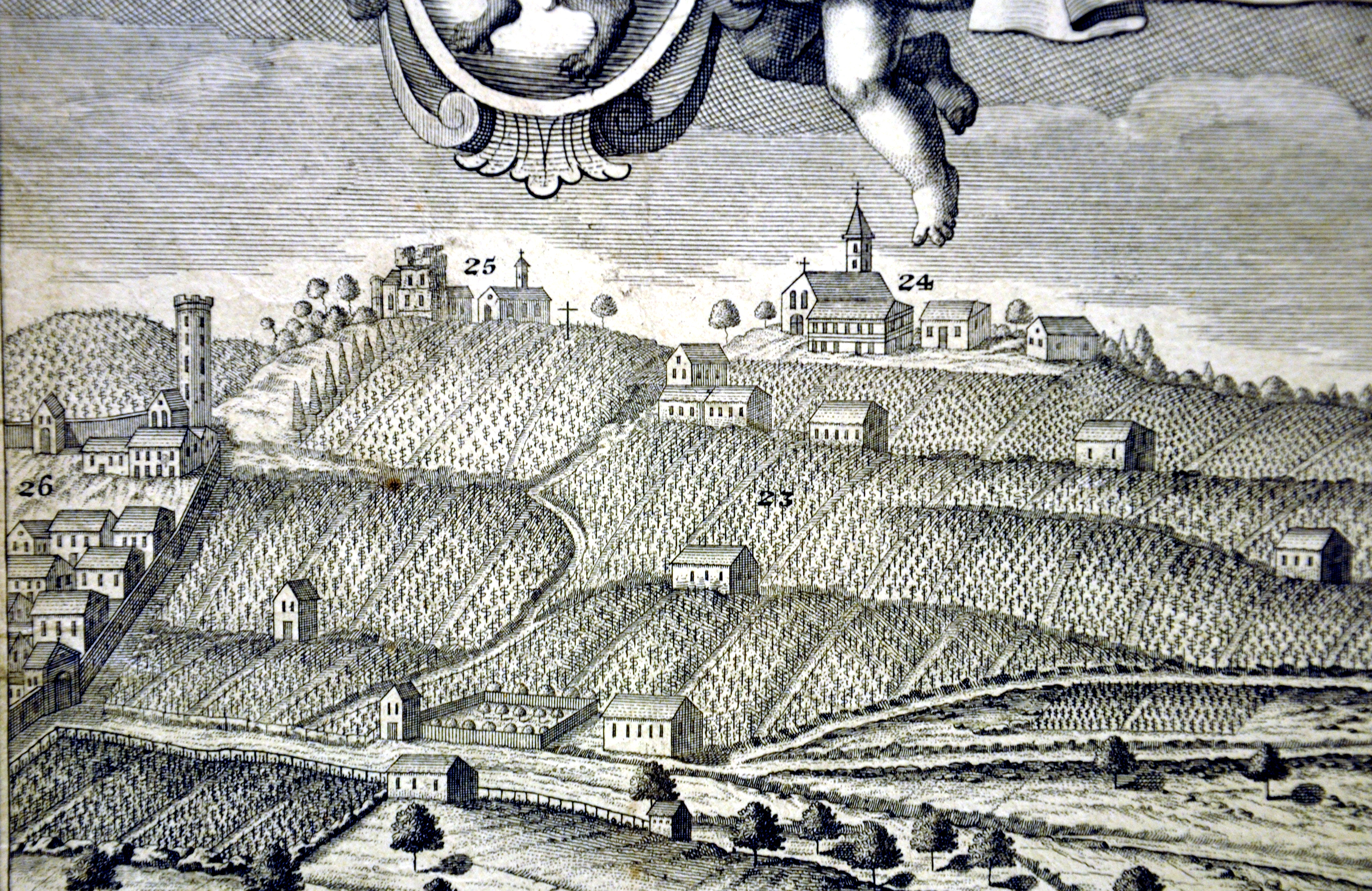
Ravensburg landscape showing local landmarks: 23. Weinberge with Torkeln; 24. St. Christina; 25. Veitsburg; 26. Ravensburg with Mehlsack. Most of the hillsides are shown covered with vineyards. From Kloster Weißenau (stylized print by Johann Mathias Steidlin, 1734).

The "Great Ravensburg Trading Society" (Große Ravensburger Handelsgesellschaft) was founded at Ravensburg and Konstanz around 1380 by the merchant families of Humpis (from Ravensburg), Mötteli (from Buchhorn, modern-day Friedrichshafen) and Muntprat (from Constance). At first, the society mostly dealt in the production of linen and fustian. With the opening of one of the first paper mills north of the Alps in 1402 in Ravensburg, paper became another commodity. The Ravensburg stores also sold oriental spices, Mediterranean wines and Bohemian ores. After the liquidation of the Great Ravensburg Trading Society in 1530, Ravensburg stagnated economically. The Thirty Years' War caused a grave decline of the population. Swedish troops destroyed the old castle, now named "Veitsburg" after the St. Veit chapel at the castle grounds.

=== Blood Libel ===
Between May and July 1430, the city succumbed to a blood libel which saw most of the city’s Jewish population burned alive on the basis of the spurious accusation that they had conspired to murder a 13-year-old Christian boy named Ludwig Ettelin.

Ettelin’s body was found hanged from a fir tree in the Haßlach forest between Ravensburg and near-by Weingarten. The corpse had been exposed for some time before it was discovered and so bore signs of post-mortem scavenging. Yet wounds to the chest and his missing genitalia signalled to many people that the boy had been the victim of ritual murder by the town’s Jewish community. Suspicions quickly focused on a wealthy Jew named Eleazarus who had hosted his daughter’s wedding celebrations in the town several months earlier. As the libel developed, Eleazarus was accused of using the wedding as a pretext to lure the boy to a secret location where he was tortured to death, his dripping blood collected to nefarious ends. The body was placed in a sack and given to a cart driver who, for three times the usual rate, disposed of it in the forest.

Because he had been seen entering Eleazarus’s house, when suspicion began to fall on the city’s Jews, the cart driver fled Ravensburg only to be arrested on his way to Überlingen. In full terror, he confessed the entire course of events, sealing the fate of Ravensburg’s Jewish community. On 3 July, all the city’s Jews who had not fled were burned. For his part, Eleazarus and the two men who were alleged to have helped him murder the boy were dragged through the town’s streets face down while being tortured with red-hot tongs before finally being burned.

The wealth and property of all the victims of the libel were confiscated by Ravensburg’s municipal officials and handed over to the emperor. The next year, the city decreed that Jews should never again be allowed to live in the city. This decree remained in force until the early nineteenth century.

=== Witch Hunt ===
Although the city prospered through the fifteenth century—best epitomised in the building of the 51-metre tall Mehlsack (or Flour sack), a defensive tower and a mark of civic pride—the 1480s proved challenging. Regional tensions that put Ravensburg in the midst of the struggle between the Hapsburg emperor, Frederick III and his cousin, Archduke Sigmund of Austria was only concluded when the city signed a protective alliance with the archduke in May 1484.

The city also fell victim to various natural disasters. Through the winter of 1482-3, plague ravaged the city. And in the summer of 1483, a savage hailstorm hit the town, ruining the crops and vineyards to such an extent that the city was still suffering the subsequent year. Although the summer weather was better in 1484, wine prices collapsed causing many to lose their livelihoods.

According to the Malleus maleficarum which provides a summary account of the subsequent witch trial from the perspective of the inquisitor, “certain people or rather virtually all the inhabitants of the town, deemed that these events had taken place through acts of sorcery” (MM, p. 383). At this, Johannes Gremper, chaplain at the parish church, the Liebfrauenkirche, with the agreement of the city’s top magistrates, contacted the inquisitor Henricus Institoris (the Latinised form of Heinrich Kramer) to investigate their worrying suspicions of witchcraft.

Gremper had already been involved in a witch hunt in the town of Waldshut on what is now the Swiss border. According to Andreas Schmauder, it is likely here that he became acquainted with Institoris. Schmauder also argues that Institoris was known to civic leaders of Ravensburg, for in 1475 a certain inquisitor identified as “Heinrich from Schlettstadt” had been sent by the Bishop of Trent to investigate the burning of Ravensburg’s Jewish community some 45 years earlier. The Jews of Rome had complained to the pope about their treatment at the hands of the bishop, and so the bishop tasked Heinrich with investigating how similar cases had been handled elsewhere. As Institoris was from Schlettstadt, Schmauder concludes that they are references to the same man.

Upon arriving in Ravensburg in 1484, Institoris preached for several days. Suspicion quickly alighted on two women: Agnes the bathkeeper and Anna of Mindelheim. In the presence of Gremper, the mayor and other civic officials, under what Institoris describes as “the lightest torture,” Agnes responded to the accusations leveled against her, admitting that for 18 years she had submitted sexually to an incubus demon, inflicting damage and harm on people, crops and animals. She also confessed that she had caused the damaging hailstorm. According to Institoris’s account in the Malleus, one day at noon she was summoned by her demon to a field north of the town. There the demon then told her to dig a hole into which she poured water. Stirring it with her finger and invoking the name of the devil, the water was promptly carried up into the air. The storm began later that day as she arrived home.

Also subjected to “the lightest torture,” Anna admitted to being present in the field at the same time as Agnes. She too had dug a hole that day, but rather than water, the devil put in “certain things unknown to her” She also confessed to having bewitched 23 horses of a certain unnamed carter who was reduced to almost abject poverty as a result.

After repeating their confessions without torture and in open court, the two women were burned at the Eschbann just outside the town. From their arrest to execution took only three days.

Institoris left the city shortly after this. He would later use the testimony he garnered from Agnes and Anna as part of his “evidence” for the power and danger of demonically allied witches in the Malleus maleficarum.

Andreas Blauert, though, has argued that from Institoris’ perspective, the witch hunt in Ravensburg was not wholly successful. In the Malleus, Institoris claimed that along with Agnes and Anna, he garnered evidence against a “not small” number of other suspects. Indeed, shortly after he left town, on 23 October 1484 an Urfehde—a guarantee of good behaviour—was sworn out by Els Frauendienst who had been imprisoned on basis of her “severe and great reputation for the wicked, manifest evil of witchcraft.” Over the next three years, similar devices were sworn out by Margreth Locher in 1486, Margetha Häggin in 1489 and Barbara Märckin in 1490. While it is not clear if all four of these women were caught up in Institoris’s inquisition, what set these women apart from Agnes and Anna is that all of them were married and benefited from the petitions of their husband and son.

=== Into the Modern Period ===
Following the Reformation a "paritetic" government emerged, meaning an equal distribution of public offices between the Catholic and Protestant confession. The city council was one half each Protestant and Catholic. For some time there was even a Catholic and a Protestant mayor at the same time, and both confessions celebrated the village fair, the "Rutenfest", apart from each other. This system was approved at the end of the Thirty Years' War in the Peace of Westphalia (1648) which named four "Paritetic Imperial Cities" (German: Paritätische Reichsstädte): Augsburg, Biberach, Dinkelsbühl and Ravensburg.

In 1803 the Immerwährende Reichstag passed the Reichsdeputationshauptschluss, a bill which included the secularisation and mediatisation of many German states — the first meaning the confiscation of the estates belonging to the church, the second the incorporation of the imperial estates and Imperial Free Cities into larger regional states. As a result, Ravensburg first became a Bavarian exclave within Württemberg. After a swap of estates between Bavaria and Württemberg it was incorporated in the Kingdom of Württemberg in 1810.

Since Ravensburg was impoverished and depopulated after the Thirty Years' War, only a few new buildings were raised during the 18th and the early 19th century. The benefit of this economic stagnation was the conservation of a widely intact medieval city with nearly all towers and gates of the historic fortification.

=== 20th century ===
During World War II Ravensburg was strategically of no relevance. Ravensburg did not harbor any noteworthy arms industry (unlike nearby Friedrichshafen with its large aircraft industry), but was home to a major aid supplies center belonging to the Swiss Red Cross. The historic city centre was not damaged by air raids.

By 1945, the city came into the French occupation zone and thus came in 1947 to the newly founded state of Württemberg-Hohenzollern, which in 1952 merged to the state of Baden-Württemberg.

In the 1970s, Ravensburg increased in population and territory by the incorporation of smaller communities like Eschach, Schmalegg and Taldorf. Ravensburg University of Cooperative Education was established in the city in 1978.

In the 1980s, the Old Town was renovated and all transit traffic was banned from the city centre.

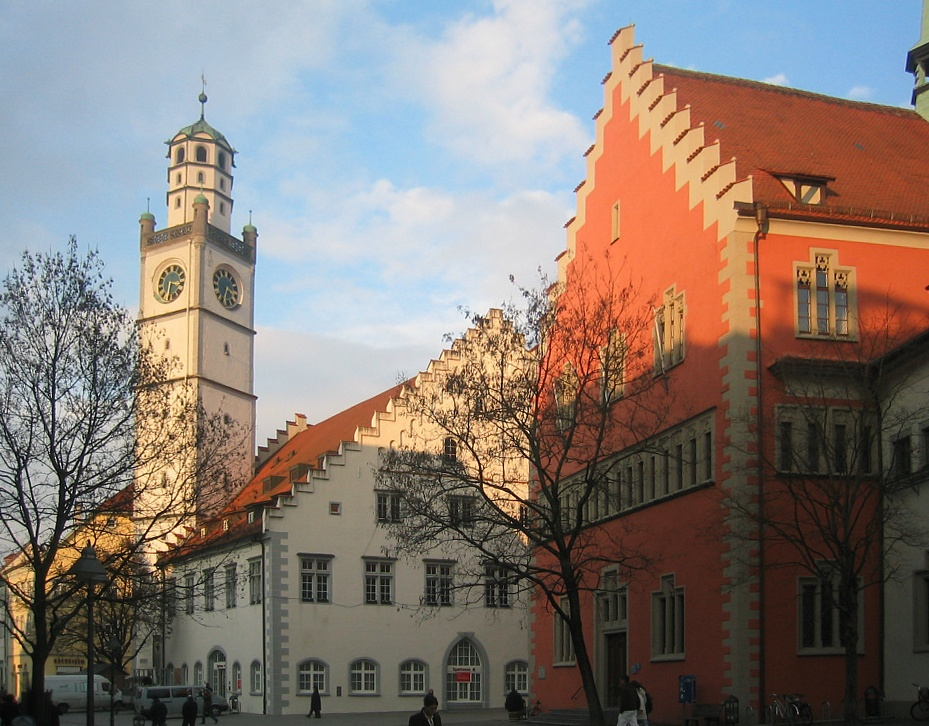
Ravensburg, Blaserturm (trumpeter's tower), Waaghaus (weighing house) and city hall

== Economy and infrastructure ==
Ravensburg is a thriving shopping city in the wealthy region of Upper Swabia. Unemployment is relatively low. The nearest large cities are Munich, Stuttgart and Zürich, approximately a two-hour drive away each. Ulm, Konstanz and Bregenz are each less than a one-hour train ride or drive away.

Ravensburg is part of an urban agglomeration that also comprises Weingarten (Württemberg) and several suburbs. Ravensburg, Weingarten, and Friedrichshafen (on the shores of Lake Constance) share the functionality of a Oberzentrum (that is, the highest-ranked centre in the system of spatial planning and development in Baden-Württemberg).

=== Transport ===
Ravensburg is located at a crossing of the federal roads (national highways) B30, B31 and B32. A by-pass highway around Ravensburg and Weingarten was completed recently. The regional airport is situated at Friedrichshafen, about 15 km south of Ravensburg. The nearest national motor-ways are the A7 and A8 (approach at Ulm) and the A96 (approach at Lindau or Wangen im Allgäu).

In 1847, the railway station of Ravensbug was put in operation, part of the so-called "Swabian Railroad" from Stuttgart to Friedrichshafen, the oldest railroad of Württemberg and well known in all of Germany by the folk-style song Auf de Schwäb'sche Eisenbahne.

In 1888, the Ravensburg–Weingarten–Baienfurt tram line was open.

=== Local businesses ===
Mechanical engineering has traditionally been the main type of industry in the region. Based on the demand of the paper and textile industries (now widely reduced) and a long tradition of flour, paper and other mills, many engineering factories arose at the end of the 19th century. Today the primary engineering firms in Ravensburg are the left-overs of the former Escher-Wyss AG (a subsidiary of the Swiss Sulzer AG) which are now subsidiaries of the Austrian "Andritz Hydro".

Ravensburger AG, whose headquarters are located in the city, is a company internationally known for board games, jigsaw puzzles and children's books.

The pastry factory de:Tekrum (Theodor Krumm GmbH & Co. KG) is another company with an internationally known brand name. Since January 2005 it has been a wholly owned subsidiary of Griesson–de Beukelaer.

Other large industrial companies include:

- Vetter Pharma, a manufacturer of pre-filled injection systems
- Omira, one of the largest dairies in southern Germany
- the tool factory Hawera Probst (a subsidiary of Robert Bosch), the worldwide market leader in hammer drill bits
- the component supplier EBZ Engineering Bausch & Ziege (formerly Nothelfer, a subsidiary of ThyssenKrupp Automotive)
- the packaging manufacturer "Coveris Rigid" (formerly Autobar Packaging)
- two suppliers of solar power systems, Pro Solar Solarstrom and pro solar Energietechnik

=== Media ===
The local newspaper is the Schwäbische Zeitung.

The radio companies Radio 7 and Südwestrundfunk run broadcasting studios at Ravensburg. In Horgenzell near Ravensburg, the Ravensburg-Horgenzell transmitter transmitted Deutschlandfunk on the medium wave frequency 756 kHz.

== Culture ==
The city's most popular festival is the annual "Rutenfest", which takes place mid year.

== Sport ==
The city's association football club FV Ravensburg, formed in 1893, has played in the Oberliga Baden-Württemberg on three occasions from 1978 to 1983, from 1998 to 2000 and again since 2003.

From 2006 to 2010, Ravensburg hosted the Air Canada Cup or MLP Nations Cup, an international women's ice hockey tournament.

== Twin towns – sister cities ==
Ravensburg is twinned with:

- Brest, Belarus
- Coswig, Germany
- Mollet del Vallès, Spain
- Montélimar, France
- Rivoli, Italy
- Aberdare, Wales, United Kingdom
- Varaždin, Croatia

== Notable people ==
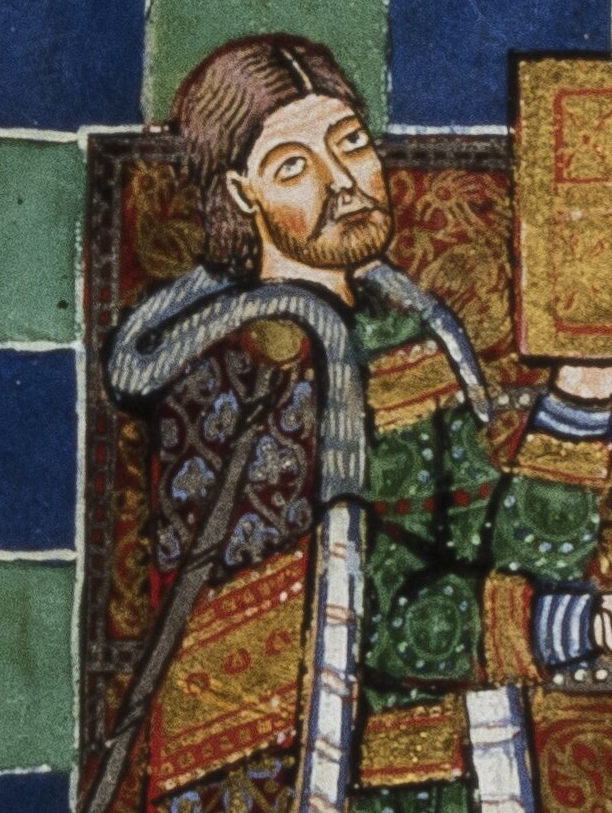
Henry the Lion, 12th century

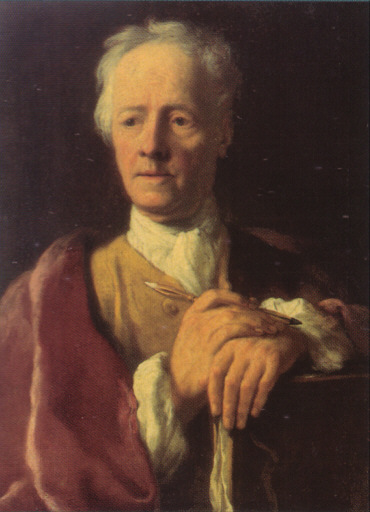
Franz Joachim Beich, 1744

- Henry the Lion (1129/1131–1195), Duke of Saxony and Bavaria.
- Ladislaus Sunthaym (c. 1440 – c. 1512), historian and geographer
- Hans Buchner (1483–1538), organist and composer
- Joannes Susenbrotus (c. 1484 – c. 1542), humanist, taught in Ravensburg from 1522
- Franz Joachim Beich (1666–1748), painter
- Gustav Rümelin (1815–1889), statistician, pedagogue and author.
- August Natterer (1868–1933), art brut artist
- Karl Erb (1877–1958), tenor
- Elisabeth Gerdts-Rupp (1888–1972), jurist, lyric poet and ethnologist
- Klaus Schwab (born 1938), economist, founder of the World Economic Forum
- Theo Seiler (born 1949), ophthalmologist and physicist, pioneer of refractive surgery
- Andreas Gestrich (born 1952), historian and director of the German Historical Institute London
- Gregor Amann (born 1962), politician (SPD), Member of Bundestag 2005–2009
- Kai Diekmann (born 1964), journalist and former chief editor of the Bild-Zeitung
- Stefanie Dimmeler (born 1967), biologist and biochemist, Leibniz Prize winner
- Kofi Ansuhenne (born 1973), boy group singer ("Bed & Breakfast")
- Linus Roth (born 1977), classical violinist and academic teacher
- Wilhelm, Duke of Württemberg (born 1994), head of the House of Württemberg
- Jonathan Mack (born 1984), human rights activist

=== Sport ===
- siblings Erich Buck, (born 1949) & Angelika Buck (born 1950), figure skaters
- Simon Henzler (born 1976), football player and coach, played 146 games
- Daniel Unger (born 1978), triathlete,
- Susanne Fellner (born 1985), ice hockey player
- Rahman Soyudogru (born 1989), footballer, played 198 games, mainly for FV Ravensburg
- Ömer Toprak (born 1989), Turkish footballer, played over 300 games and 27 for Turkey
- Emanuel Buchmann (born 1992), cyclist, comes from Vogt
- Anna-Maria Wagner (born 1996), judoka.
