= Reisenbach Telecommunication Tower =

Coordinates: 49°30′24″N 9°6′54″E

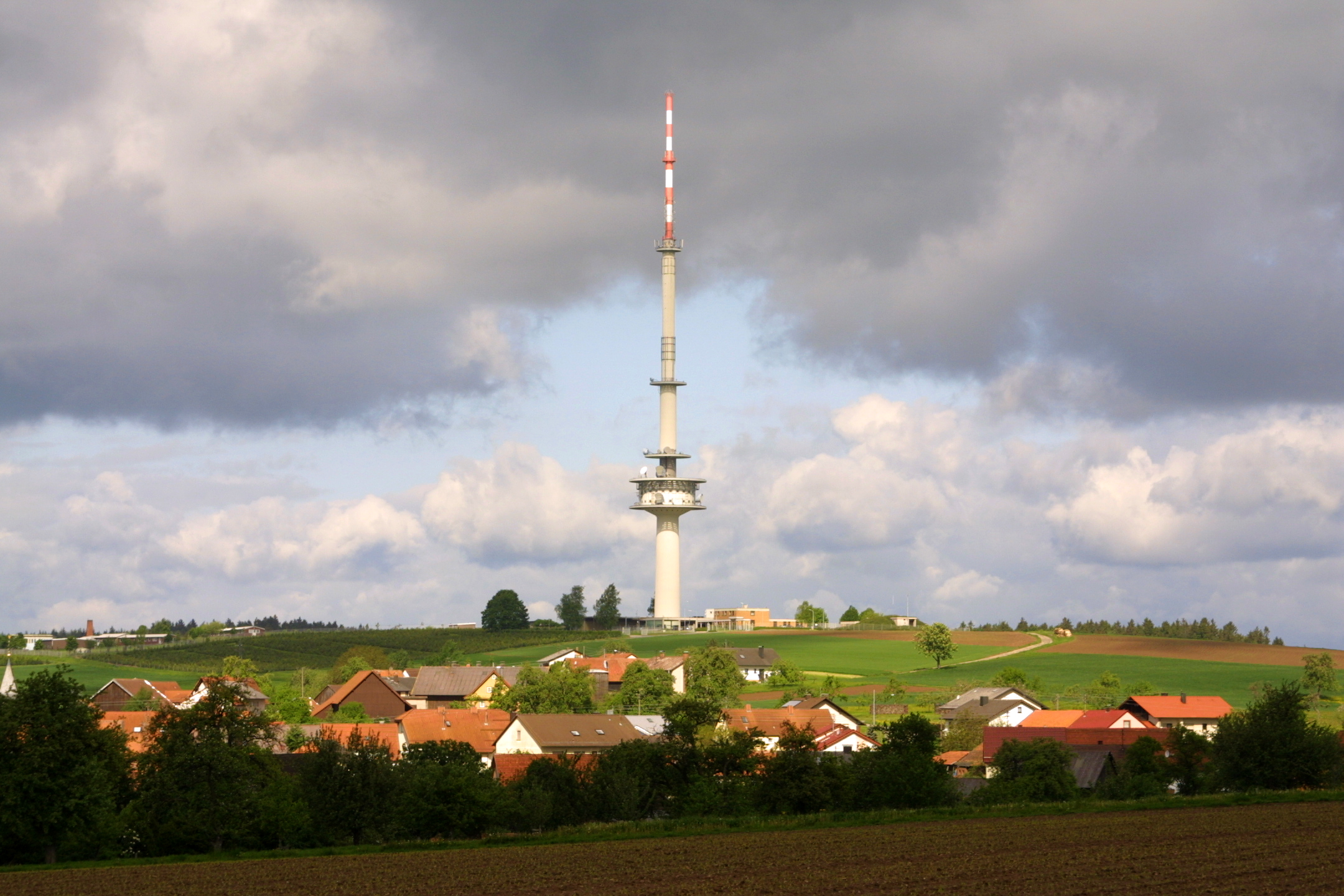
Reisenbach Telecommunication Tower.

Reisenbach Telecommunication Tower ( German designation: Fernmeldeturm Reisenbach) is among the tallest structures in the Northern parts of Baden-Württemberg. Only the two masts of Donebach longwave transmitter are taller in the Mudau community. As the masts of Donebach transmitter, Reisenbach Telecommunication Tower is property of Deutsche Telekom AG.

It is a concrete telecommunication tower from the FMT3 type. It is among the tallest standardised telecommunication towers (Typenturm) of the Deutsche Telekom AG.

Reisenbach Telecommunication Tower was built in 1972. It is situated in the part Reisenbach of Mudau at Kirchstraase. It is used as directional radio tower and for transmitting the program of "sunshine live" on 100 kW with an ERP of 25 kW.

== See also ==
- List of towers
