= Erching transmitter =

Coordinates: 48°17′56″N 11°42′59″E

Erching transmitter, drawing from 1957

The Erching transmitter was a longwave broadcasting facility of the Voice of America, established in 1953 near Erching, Bavaria, Germany. The transmitter used a 256-metre-high (840 ft) guyed-steel-framework mast aerial, at the time of its inauguration the most powerful radio station in the world, with a transmitting power of 1000 kilowatts on 173 kHz.

In 1973 the transmitter was shut down because of a relaxed political climate. In 1979 it was used for LORAN-D tests. The German Federal Post received a new frequency of 151 kHz for this transmitter and used it for broadcasting the programming of Deutschlandfunk. Because directional radiation was required at night time, a second aerial mast had to be erected. This was impossible because of the then-planned new Munich International Airport (opened in 1992), so the transmitter had to be shut down at night time.

A new transmitter site was consequently placed at Aholming in 1985. After the completion of this new transmitter, Erching tower was shut down and dismantled. Presently, the property is privately owned and let for film and photography.

== See also ==
- List of masts
