= Mudau =

- Municipality
- Coat of arms

- Location of Mudau within Neckar-Odenwald-Kreis district
- Interactive map of Mudau
- Location within Germany Location within Baden-Württemberg
- Coordinates: 49°31′59″N 9°12′19″E
- Country: Germany
- State: Baden-Württemberg
- Admin. region: Karlsruhe
- District: Neckar-Odenwald-Kreis
- Subdivisions: 9

Government
  - Mayor (2019–27): Dr. Norbert Rippberger (CDU)

Area
  - Total: 107.49 km^{2} (41.50 sq mi)
- Elevation: 456 m (1,496 ft)

Population (2025-12-31)
  - Total: 4,951
  - Density: 46.06/km^{2} (119.3/sq mi)
- Time zone: UTC+01:00 (CET)
  - Summer (DST): UTC+02:00 (CEST)
- Postal codes: 69427
- Dialling codes: 06284
- Vehicle registration: MOS, BCH
- Website: www.mudau.de

Mudau (German pronunciation: [ˈmuːdaʊ]) is a municipality in the Neckar-Odenwald district, Baden-Württemberg, Germany. As of 2013 it has 4,833 inhabitants.

== Geography ==
Mudau lies in the southeastern Odenwald mountains between the Neckar and Main rivers, 75 km southeast of Frankfurt am Main and 40 km northeast of Heidelberg. The area is heavily forested, resting on coloured sandstone plateaus at 285 to 576 m elevation, sloping downward to the Bauland region. Many streams originate in the area around Mudau, owing to its location on the Neckar-Main watershed; some have cut canyons as much as 200 m deep into the sandstone. Streams considered significant are the Gabelbach, Mudbach, and Steinbächlein which flow into the Main, and the Reisenbach, Trienzbach, and Elz which flow into the Neckar.

Mudau is an officially recognized resort in the Naturpark-Neckartal-Odenwald.

== Demographics ==
Population development:

Year	Inhabitants
1990	4,979
2001	5,101
2011	4,899
2021	4,932

== History ==
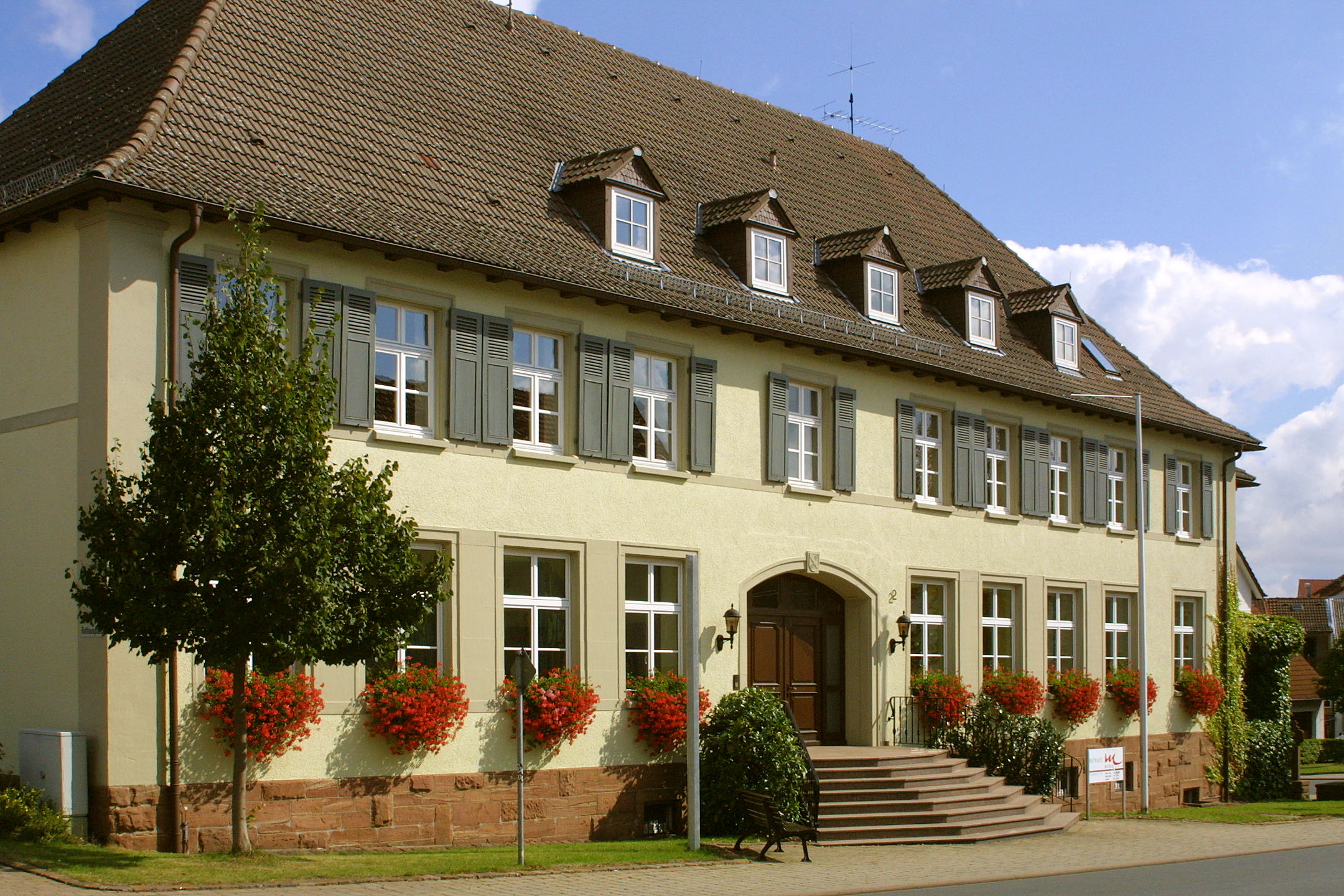
Town hall Mudau

- 2nd/3rd century: During the period of Roman control (approximately 98–260 AD) the area that is now Mudau lay within the province of Germania Superior. Remnants of the Neckar-Odenwald Limes are visible today near Schlossau and Scheidental.
- 11th/12th century: In the high Middle Ages the Benedictine monastery of Amorbach Abbey started new settlements in the forest area south of Amorbach. The municipalities have their origin here.
- 12th/13th century: Mudau's lands were placed under the supervision of the noblemen of Duern and were assigned to the nearby Castle Wildenberg (also known as Castle Wildenburg) in Odenwald.
- 1271: By purchase in the year 1271 the rule rights came to the Archbishop of Mainz. Mudau was the principal seat of the 'Mudauer Zent'.
- 1426: Mudau was separated from the old parish of Hollerbach and became the church centre, with 13 chapelries.
- 1525: During the German Peasants' War the nearby Amorbach Abbey was plundered and Castle Wildenberg destroyed. Götz von Berlichingen was the captain of the soldiers called 'Heller Haufen'.
- 17th century: During the 17th century Mudau became an important market town with several annual and cattle markets.
- 1618 - 1648: During the Thirty Years' War troops of allies and enemies both marched through the town and took quarter here.
- 1803: During the Secularization Mudau became part of the Principality of Leiningen.
- 1806: Mudau becomes part of the Grand Duchy of Baden.
- 1848: During the German Revolutions of 1848 (also known as the March Revolution), the principality's property at Marienhoehe bei Buchen and the revenue office in Ernsttal were burned. The city halls were stormed.
- 1849: Two-thirds of the town was destroyed by a major fire.
- 1967: Sender Donebach begins transmitting.
- 1974: Closure of the narrow-gauge railway from Mosbach to Mudau
- 1982: The transmission towers of the longwave transmitting station were extended to 363 m, thus becoming the tallest built structures in Western Europe.

The wavy band in the coat of arms represents the Mudbach, while the wheels refer to the arms of Mainz.

== Points of interest ==
- trail along the Neckar-Odenwald Limes in Schlossau with numerous remnants. The Neckar-Odenwald Limes led from Bad Wimpfen at the Neckar to the north across Neckarburken, Oberscheidental, Schlossau after Woerth at the Main river.
- Roman fort at Scheidental
- chapel of Saint Veit and Saint Martin in Steinbach by 1494 with an altar of the school of Tilman Riemenschneider.
- castle Waldleiningen (built 1828 in the Windsor style), used today as a sanatorium
- old city hall Mudau (1434)
- catholic parish church Mudau (tower by 1510)
- baroque column ‘Mariensaeule’ Mudau by 1736
- Neo-Gothic parish church Schlossau, built 1864
- gallows in Mudau
- Sender Donebach: two 363-metre transmission towers, the second-tallest structures in Germany.
- Reisenbach Telecommunication Tower: a 173 m tall telecommunication tower built in 1972.
