= Elisabeth Gerdts-Rupp =

German ethnologist (1888–1972)

Elisabeth Gerdts-Rupp (born Elisabeth Rupp, 23 November 1888 – 18 March 1972) was a German jurist, lyric poet and a respected ethnologist.

== Life ==
=== Family Provenance and earlier years ===
Elisabeth "Lisel" Rupp was born in Ravensburg, a mid-sized town which at that time had still not fully recovered its prosperity following the predations of the Thirty Years War more than two centuries earlier, located a short distance away from Lake Constance in the extreme south of Germany. She was the eldest of her parents' three recorded children. Erwin von Rupp (1855–1916), Lisel's father, was a senior judge. In 1896, while she was still young, her father was promoted, as a result of which the family relocated to Stuttgart which is where she successfully completed her schooling at a private all-girls' Gymnasium (secondary school) in 1906. Both her siblings also went on to achieve a measure of prominence in their different fields: Maria Rupp (1891–1956) became a sculptor while Hans Georg Rupp (1907-1989) followed his father into the judiciary, sitting as a member of the West German Constitutional Court in Karlsruhe for a quarter of a century between 1951 and 1975. There are indications in her autobiography that Lisel Rupp was not hugely impressed by the city in which she spent the second half of her childhood. It was nevertheless important to the way that her career subsequently unfolded that in 1904 the school she attended had become only the second in the whole of Germany to start preparing girls for the Abitur. The Abitur was (and still is) the school leaving exam: passing it opened the way to a university-level education which had traditionally been a privilege reserved to men.

=== University ===
She moved on to study Jurisprudence at Straßburg in 1909 or 1910, later progressing to Leipzig and Berlin. She was encouraged to attend university by her mother, even though her father (until persuaded otherwise by his wife and daughter) had foreseen for Elisabeth a future as a wife and mother rather than as an academic. He was somewhat placated by her decision to study for a legal degree, though her own autobiographical writings indicate in the event she was also able to find time for other subjects alongside the law course. There are also hints of a full and active social life, as "the only woman among a hundred men". In 1913 she received her doctorate in jurisprudence for a dissertation entitled Das Recht auf den Tod (loosely, "The legal right to die"). The topic was inspired by a friend announcing the intention to commit suicide. A couple of years earlier her family had moved to Berlin when her father accepted an appointment to the German Criminal Law Commission, but the term of his appointment came to an end in 1913 and the Rupps moved back to Stuttgart, which may explain why, despite having spent only her first two semesters at Straßburg before moving on to Leipzig and then Berlin, it was to Straßburg that she returned (relatively close to Stuttgart) to conclude her doctoral studies. (Straßburg had reverted to German control - and spelling - in 1871.) Her doctoral supervisor was Wilhelm van Calker. Elisabeth Rupp was also able to use her time at university to extend her knowledge of the arts, music and literature.

=== Berlin ===
After concluding her university studies she moved to Berlin where she took a paid position, working with a "Social Work Association". At this time she seriously considered becoming an actress, but she was persuaded not to pursue this option. Appearing on the stage would have been considered "unsuitable" for a woman of her class. In 1916, frustrated by her experiences in Berlin, she moved again, this time to Reutlingen where she lived with her grandparents and began to write. Several small volumes of poetry appeared, in which she presented scenarios from the world of nature as a contrast to the social conditions created and desecrated by human actions. Her first volume, appearing in 1916, was entitled Wiesnelieder (loosely, "Songs from the fields"). That was followed in 1918 with Wolke, Wiese, Welt (loosely, "Clouds, fields, world"). Around this time she had what one source describes as "an encounter with Hermann Hesse". Elsewhere there are indications of a brief affair between the two of them. Her biographer Hermann Bausinger quoted a remark she offered in 1988: "...but did you not know that I was the concubine of Hermann Hesse?". She had, indeed, already described the passion between the two of them in a short story published in 1921 entitled "Malen und Eobar". Rupp and Hesse had a shared interest in Indian philosophies.

=== Argentina and marriage ===
In 1922 the need to explore new horizons prevailed over her recurring tendency to home sickness, as Elisabeth Rupp went to Argentina for a year. She worked as a home-tutor for a prosperous German family there. There was time for reading and thinking and for close observation: she became very critical of the upper-class social mores she came across in the expatriate community, especially with respect to the subordination of women. She traveled to and from Argentina on the luxury passenger steamer Cap Polonio, and although she was obliged to travel third-class, she was able to interact with first-class passengers such as, most importantly, the naval officer Jan Gerdts. They married. According to one source, the necessary formalities were concluded on the ship before they arrived back in Hamburg, the principal German port for intercontinental shipping. If anyone had thought that marriage would be followed by a life of conventional domesticity they would have been disappointed. Johannes "Jan" Gerdts' work on transatlantic passenger liners meant that he was frequently away from home for weeks on end. The marriage did, however, provide Elisabeth Gerdts-Rupp with improved opportunities for international travel. The couple remained together till Jan Gerdts committed suicide while in command of SS Cap Arcona (by this time, her engines barely working, in use as a prison ship) shortly before the end of the Second World War.

=== Back to university ===
Elisabeth Gerdts-Rupp meanwhile embarked on a new academic career in 1925, attending lectures at the University of Tübingen on Ethnology and Geography. She was taught by Augustin Krämer. Her studies led to the award of a second doctorate, this time awarded by the University of Tübingen, in 1934. Her work concerned the pre-conquest lives of Arauca people of what became part of Chile. The work involved her in close study of Spanish-language sources archived in Seville and in Argentina. In the introduction to her dissertation she expressed regret that she had been unable to afford to study Chilean archives as well. Because she was able to work only with Spanish language sources her work naturally saw the customs and practices of the Araucans through the prism of records compiled by their Spanish conquerors. The work was extensively reworked and published for a wider readership by the (then) Hamburg-based Ibero-American Institute, under the title Magische Vorstellungen und Bräuche der Araukaner im Spiegel spanischer Quellen seit der Conquista (loosely, "The magical concepts and customs of the Araucans as reflected in post-conquest Spanish sources"). Subsequent scholars have criticised an apparent focus on the “magical understandings” and "magical customs" of the people, giving rise to the judgment that the work has become "completely outdated". Presumably that is not how it would have been perceived in 1937, however, and it seems to have assured her acceptance in academic quarters as a competent, if in some respects unconventional, ethnologist. During the later 1930s Gerdts-Rupp also undertook study trips in North Africa, South America and the Near East.

=== Ethnologist and scholar ===
She worked for a couple of years at the Hamburg Ethnology Museum. However, the outbreak of war in 1939 put an end to her travels, as passenger ships were requisitioned for military use. That year she returned to Tübingen as an Ethnology teacher. The appointment was "honorary" (unpaid), and she continued to teach on an honorary basis till 1947 when she received from the university a more conventional teaching contract.

Following her husband's suicide she remained in Tübingen till her retirement in 1959, at one stage taking responsibility for both the Geography and Ethnology departments, and living with a "flock" of house-cats in some rooms at the "Tübinger Schloß" (castle). (The castle site also, by this time, accommodated the university Ethnology Faculty.) Among her more noteworthy students were Friedrich Kussmaul, Heinz Walter and Hermann Bausinger. In 1960 she returned to the region of her birth, settling on the shores of Lake Constance. She involved herself in nature conservation and continued to write poetry. Her poetry volume Tier und Landschaft. Gedichte aus fünf Jahrzehnten ("Animals and countryside. Poems from five decades") was published in 1958.

Elisabeth Gerdts-Rupp died at Radolfzell, a small town at the western end of the lake, on 18 March 1972.

== Publications (selection) ==
- Das Recht auf den Tod. Stuttgart 1913
- Wolke, Wiese, Welt. Neue Gedichte. Stuttgart 1918
- Magische Vorstellungen und Bräuche der Araukaner im Spiegel spanischer Quellen seit der Conquista. Hamburg 1937
- Mariquina – Aufzeichnungen aus der grünen Wüste. Tübingen 1950
- Tier und Landschaft. Gedichte aus fünf Jahrzehnten. Tübingen 1968
- Im Zweige. Erlebnis einer Jugend (produced by Hermann Bausinger), Eggingen 2005, ISBN 3-86142-318-9
