= Ehndorf transmitter =

Coordinates: 54.04197°N 9.84772°E

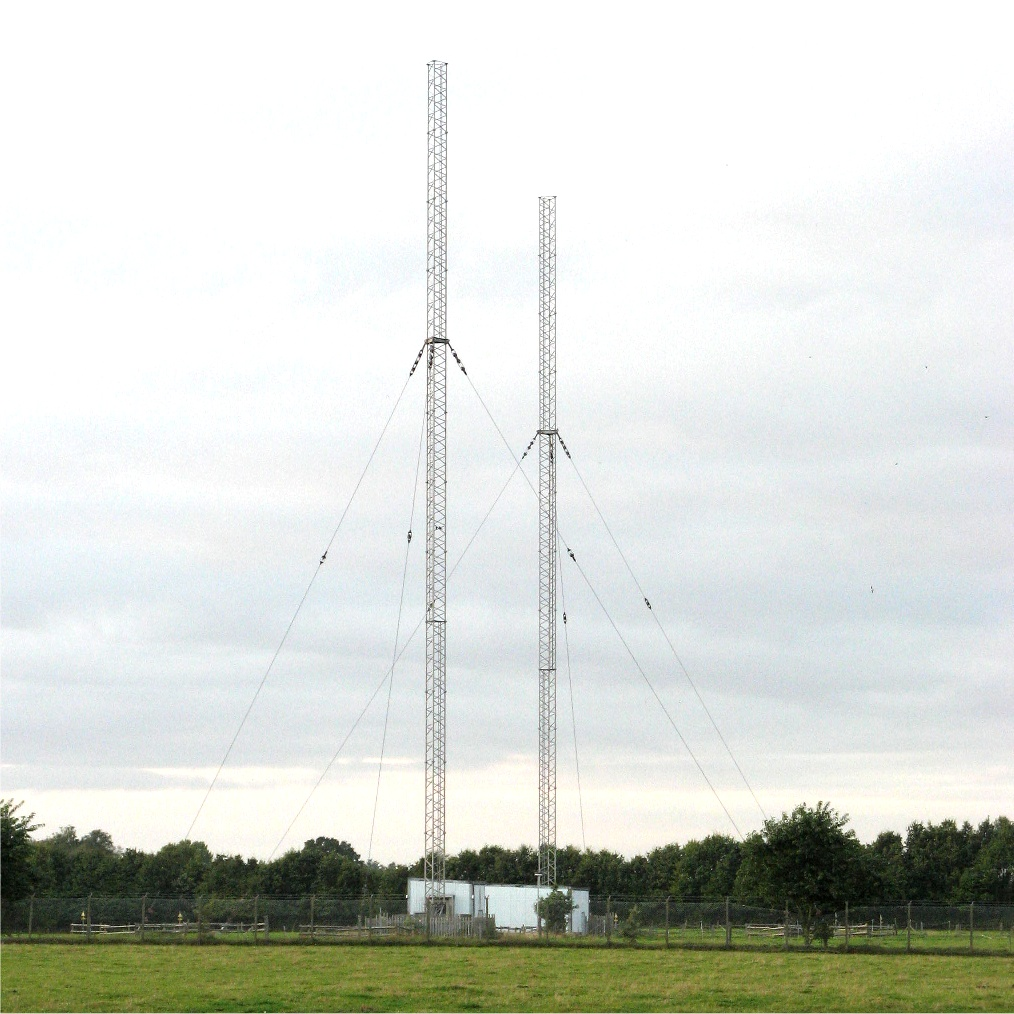
MW transmitting site at Ehndorf, Germany

Ehndorf transmitter was a mediumwave radio transmission mast located at Ehndorf, a village west of Neumünster in Schleswig-Holstein, Federal Republic of Germany. Owned by Deutsche Telekom, until 1978 the facility broadcast Deutschlandfunk on 1269 kHz (1268 kHz). It went into service in November 1967 at a power of 600 kW (then one of the highest powered transmitters in Europe), reduced to 300 kW in 1995. On 31 December 2015 all mediumwave transmissions of the Deutschlandfunk ceased at 2350 CET.

The Ehndorf antenna has 2 masts to allow directional radiation at night (the same frequency is used by a station in Novi Sad, Serbia). Both masts are groundfed 65 metres (213 ft) tall lattice steel constructions guyed in one level.

== Cold War programming ==
During the daytime, Ehndorf aired Deutschlandfunk's German language programming for listeners in East Germany. In the evening, it aired programmes in Danish, Dutch, English, Norwegian and Swedish, for listeners in the free countries of northwest Europe. Deutschlandfunk's European Department was transferred to Deutsche Welle from 1 June 1993, which first replaced the distinctive productions for British and Irish listeners, and finally dropped transmissions from Ehndorf entirely. From 1 January 1994, Deutschlandfunk's German programmes became a speech service for all domestic listeners.

== Maritime programming ==
Because of its good coverage of the North Sea and Baltic Sea, Ehndorf had been used to transmit maritime meteorological reports at certain times, which are important for amateur sailors.
