= Jonathan Mack =

German human rights activist, writer and scholar

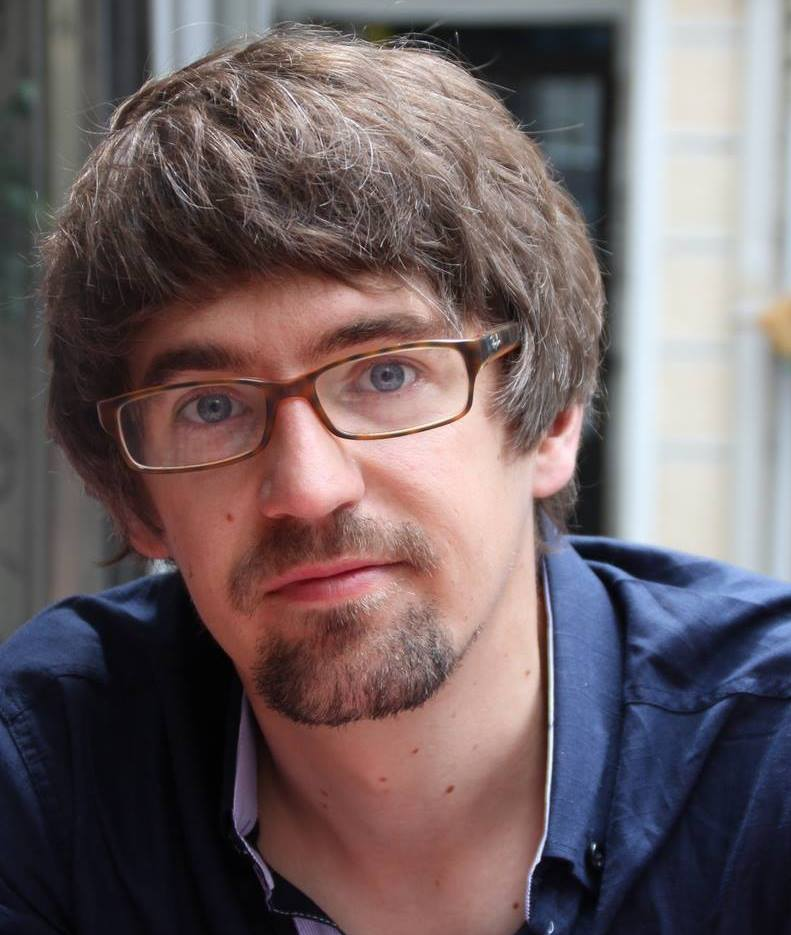
- Born: 10 January 1984 (age 42); Ravensburg, Germany
- Education: Free University Berlin
- Occupations: Human rights activist and educator
- Employer: Council of Europe
- Organization: ternYpe International Roma Youth Network

Jonathan Mack (born 10 January 1984 in Ravensburg, Germany) is a German human rights activist, educator and scholar. Mack has a diploma in political sciences of the Free University Berlin, and currently works as political advisor at the Central Council of German Sinti and Roma.

Since 2006 he supported various local, national and international Roma youth organizations to develop youth strategies and programs for the empowerment and active citizenship of Roma youth, and to combat Antigypsyism.

Mack established with various Roma youth organizations the ternYpe International Roma Youth Network in 2009, and developed the Roma Genocide Remembrance Initiative to commemorate and lobby for the political recognition of the porajmos.

From 2012 until 2015 he worked as the managing director of the Phiren Amenca International Network, based in Budapest. Jonathan Mack worked as freelance trainer and facilitator on issues of Antigypsyism, human rights, remembrance and Holocaust education with the Council of Europe, and various international youth organizations. He has a long time experience regarding youth policies and programs on UN, EU and German federal level.
