= Megaradio =

German radio station

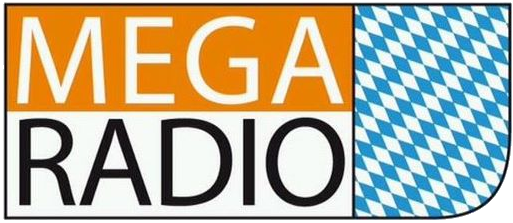

Megaradio was a German-speaking, privately owned radio station that began broadcasting in 1997. It operated on various medium-wave frequencies in Germany and Luxembourg, primarily from transmission sites such as the Marnach transmitter in Luxembourg. The station aired German-language pop music programs.

Megaradio had the potential to reach a wide audience, particularly across Europe at night, due to the strength of its transmitters. However, despite this expansive coverage, the station faced commercial challenges and filed for bankruptcy on 17 March 2003. It was ultimately discontinued on 4 April 2003, at 1 AM. After its closure, most of the transmission facilities used by Megaradio, including those in Germany, were decommissioned, though the Marnach transmitter continued to operate until the end of 2015.
