= Ravensburg-Horgenzell transmitter =

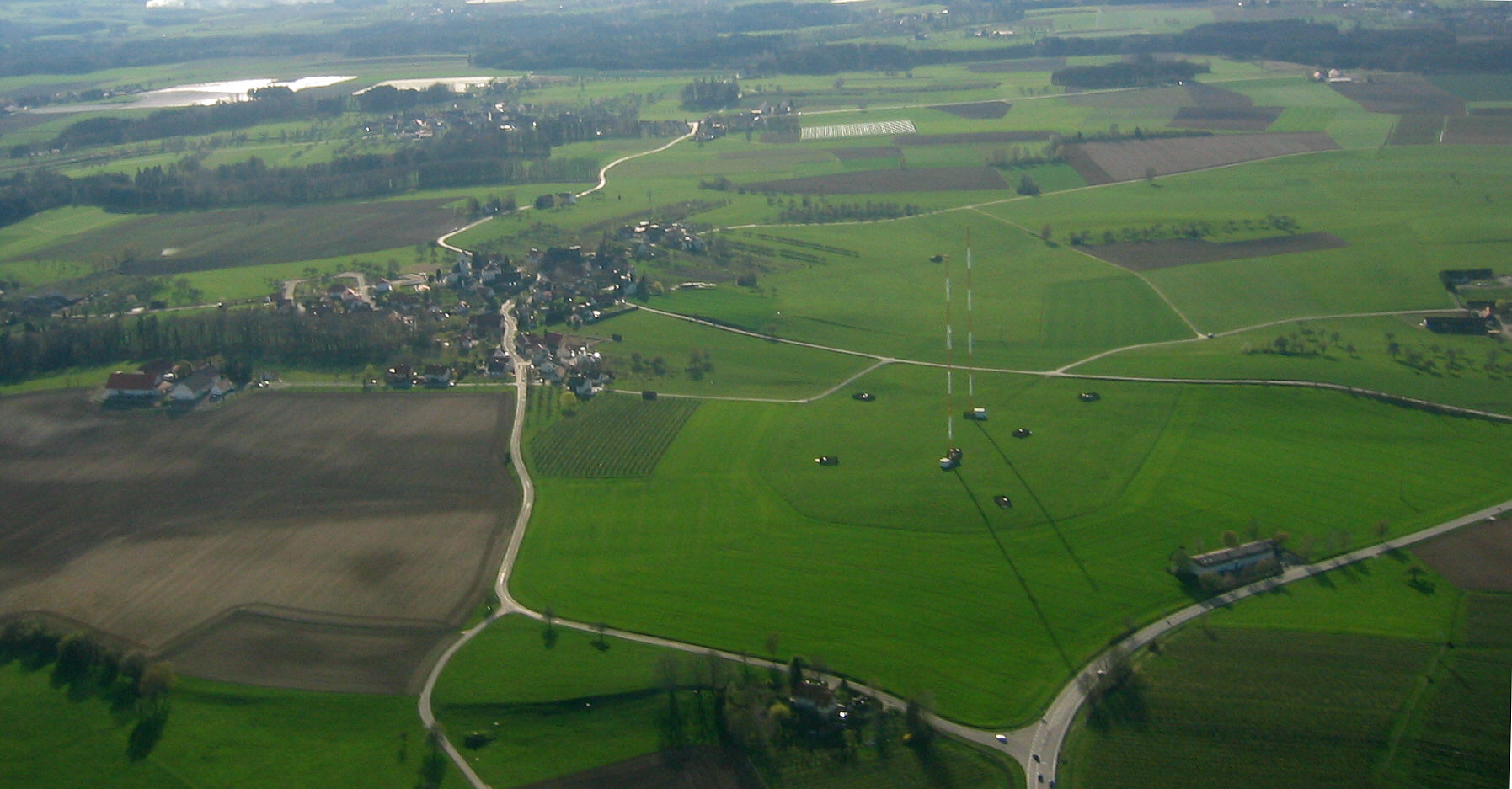
Aerial view of Horgenzell with Ravensburg-Horgenzell transmitter

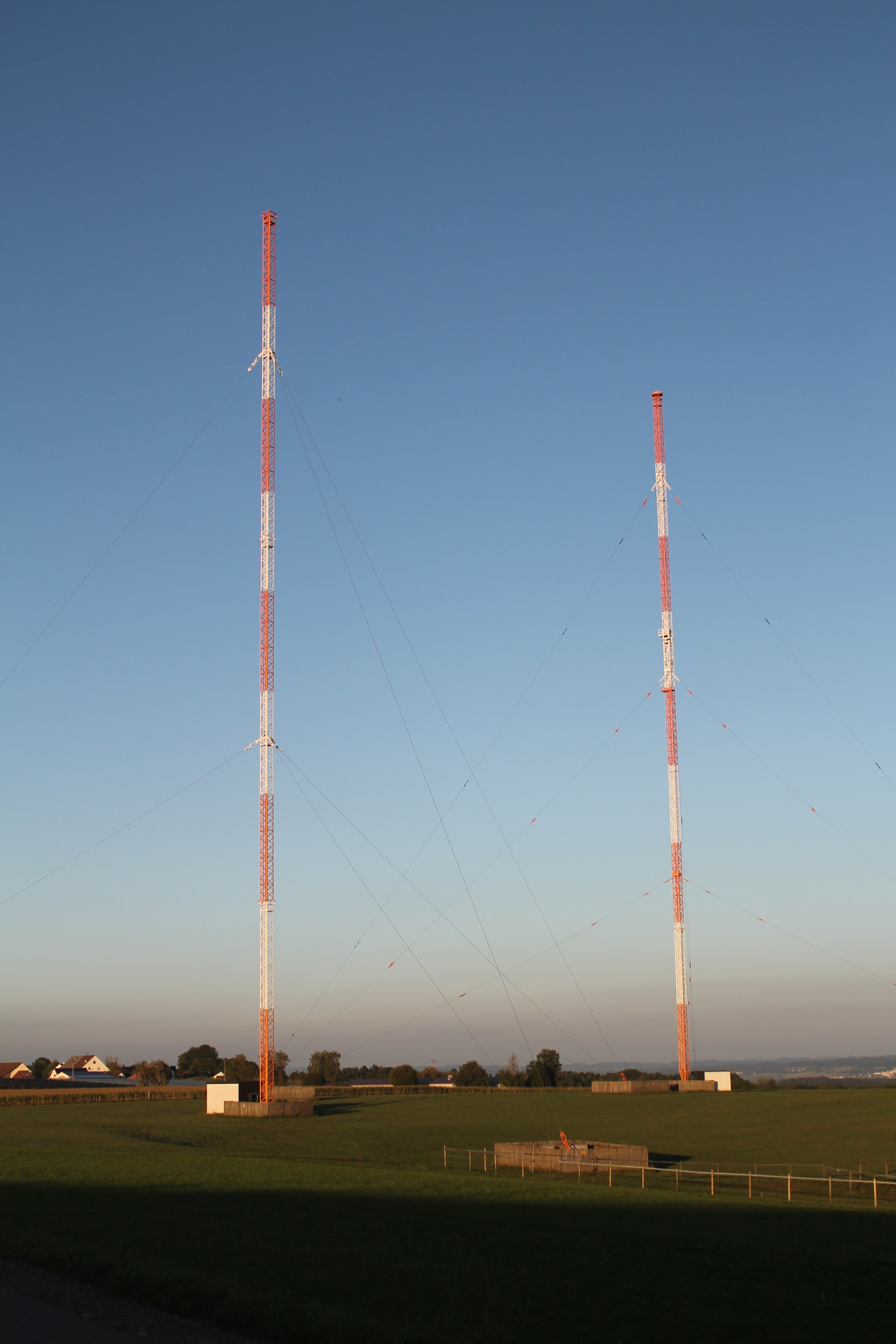
Ravensburg mediumwave transmitter

Ravensburg-Horgenzell transmitter was a medium wave broadcasting facility of Deutsche Telekom used for transmitting the program of Deutschlandfunk on the area of community Horgenzell northwest of Ravensburg in Baden-Württemberg. It was inaugurated on August 23, 1951, and used until 1959 for transmitting the radio programme of SWF with a transmission power of 40 kW on 1538 kHz. As antenna, it used a 120-metre-tall (390 ft) guyed ground-fed lattice steel mast radiator at 47°47'10" N and 9°31'16" E.

In 1964 after Bodenseesender took over its task, it was given from SWF to German Federal Post (Deutsche Bundespost) and its frequency was changed to 755 kHz, in order to form a single-frequency network with Cremlingen transmitter near Brunswick in Lower Saxony. Because this frequency, which allowed a much better groundwave propagation, was also used by Sottens transmitter in Switzerland, close to its 120-metre-tall (390 ft) mast radiator, an 80-metre-tall (260 ft) guyed reflector mast had to be built.

In 1968 its transmission power was increased from 20 kW to 100 kW. To avoid jamming other stations, it had to be switched to 30 kW (or off) at night. This changed in the 1970s, when a new mast was built. The old mast was transformed into a reflector mast to allow the use of directional radiation.

The waveplan of Geneva resulted in a frequency shift together with Cremlingen transmitter to 756 kHz, while Sottens transmitter got a new frequency. The radiation minimum toward the southwest was not required any more. However, a new radiation minimum toward the east-southeast in the direction of Timișoara in Romania, where a station on the same frequency works, was necessary according to the waveplan of Geneva. To achieve this, a new 120-metre-tall (390 ft) ground-fed guyed lattice steel mast radiator was built northwestward of the old 120-metre mast at 47°47'11 N and 9°31'12" E.

After its completion, the new mast worked as radiator, while the old mast got a reflector. The old 80-metre-tall (260 ft) reflector mast, which became obsolete, was dismantled.

With this antenna configuration operation with 100 kW was possible 24 hours per day, at daytime with omnidirectional and at nighttime with directional radiation.

Both masts were dismantled on January 24, 2018.

== Masts ==
The station uses as antenna two guyed mast radiators, situated at 47.785504°N 9.518484°E and 47.785349°N 9.519793°E. Both masts are 120 metres high and grounded. They were built in 1951 (eastern mast) and 1978 (western mast). Before 1964 the older mast was electrically divided into two parts by an intermediate insulator, still visible. The ladder on the mast at that spot runs outside.

The older mast was guyed on three levels: the wires of the topmost guy were not divided by insulators, but by coils at the anchor points. The lower guys used insulators.

The newer mast was guyed in two levels. All its guys were grounded via coils at the anchor points.

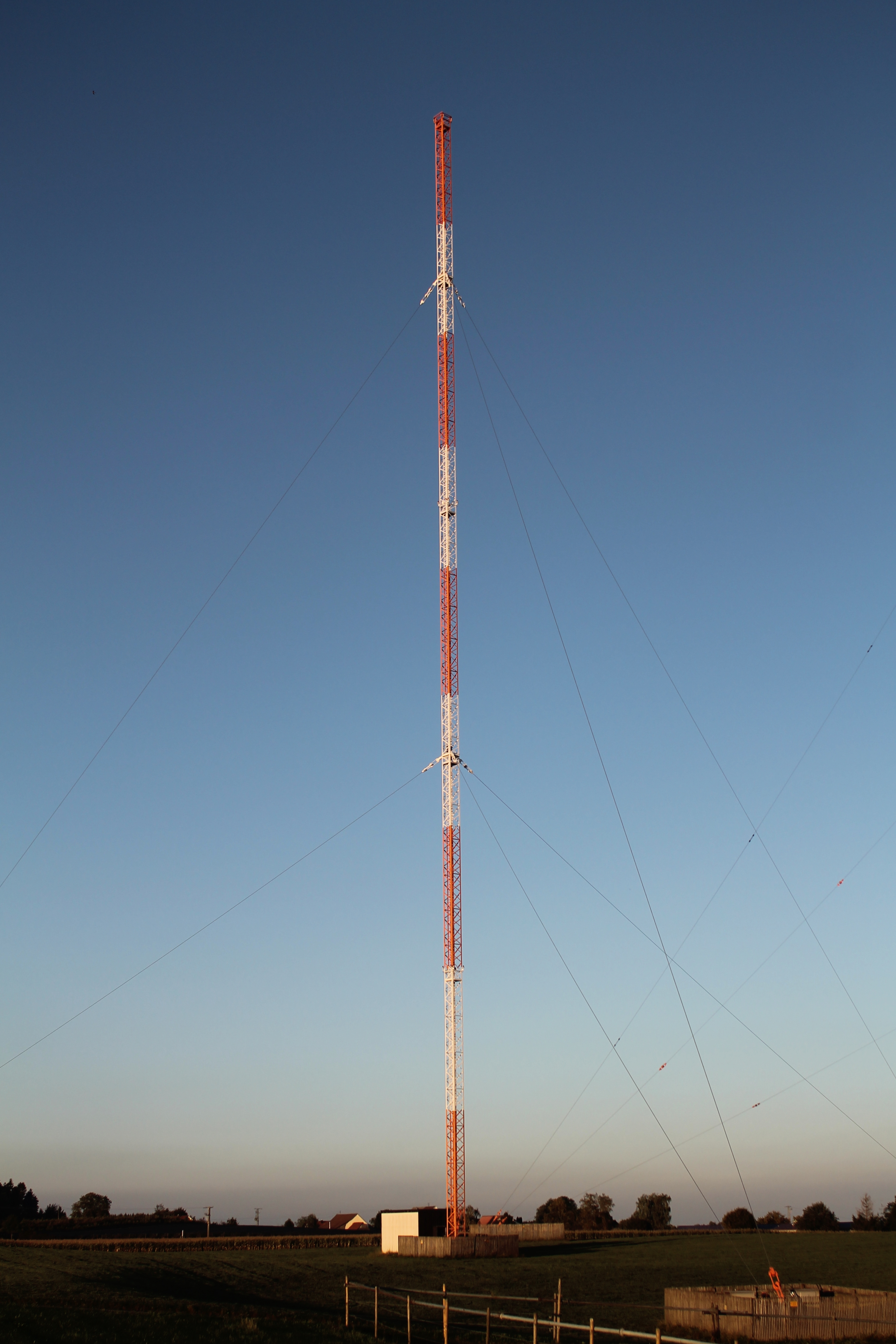
Newer Mast of Ravensburg mediumwave transmitter

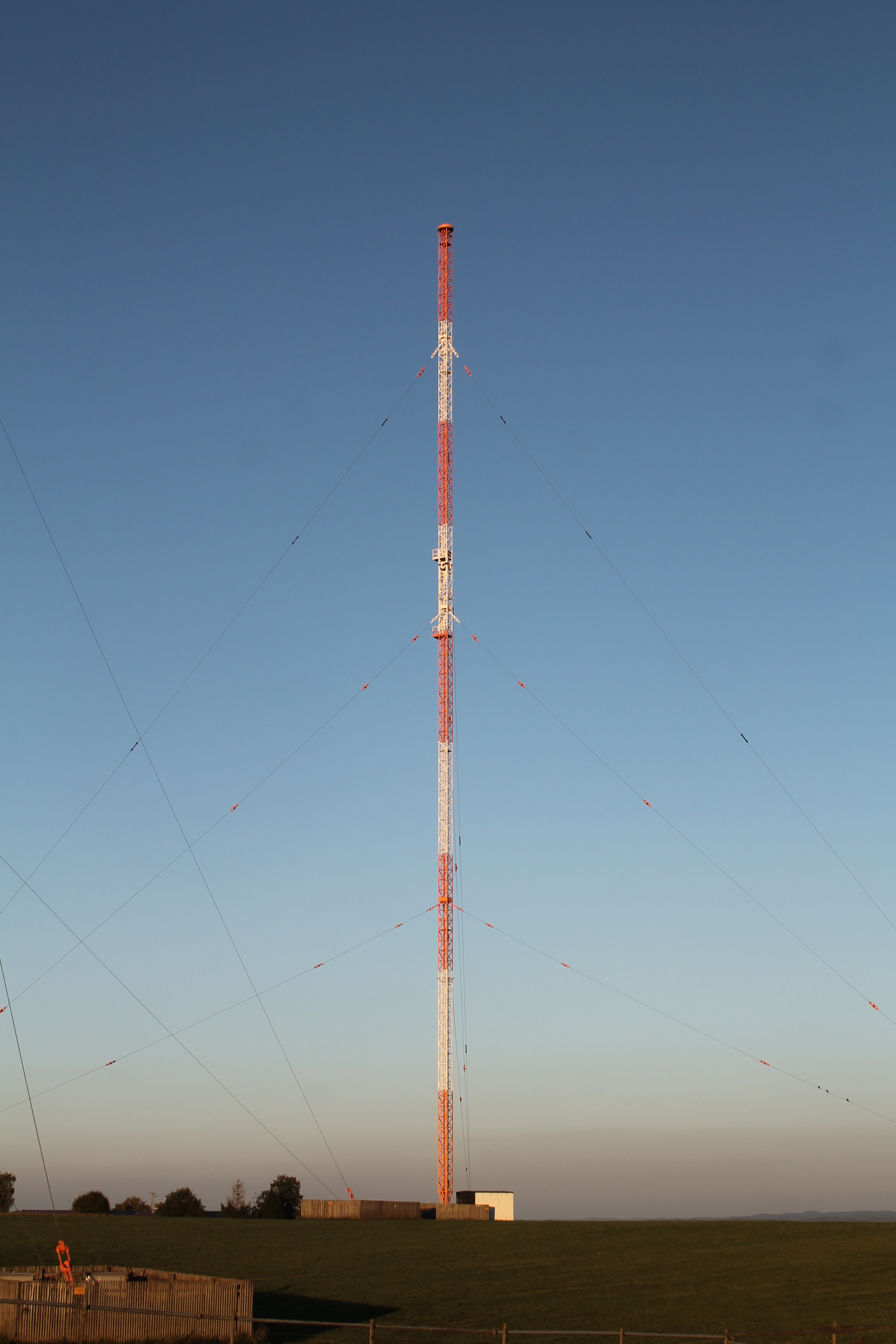
Older Mast of Ravensburg mediumwave transmitter

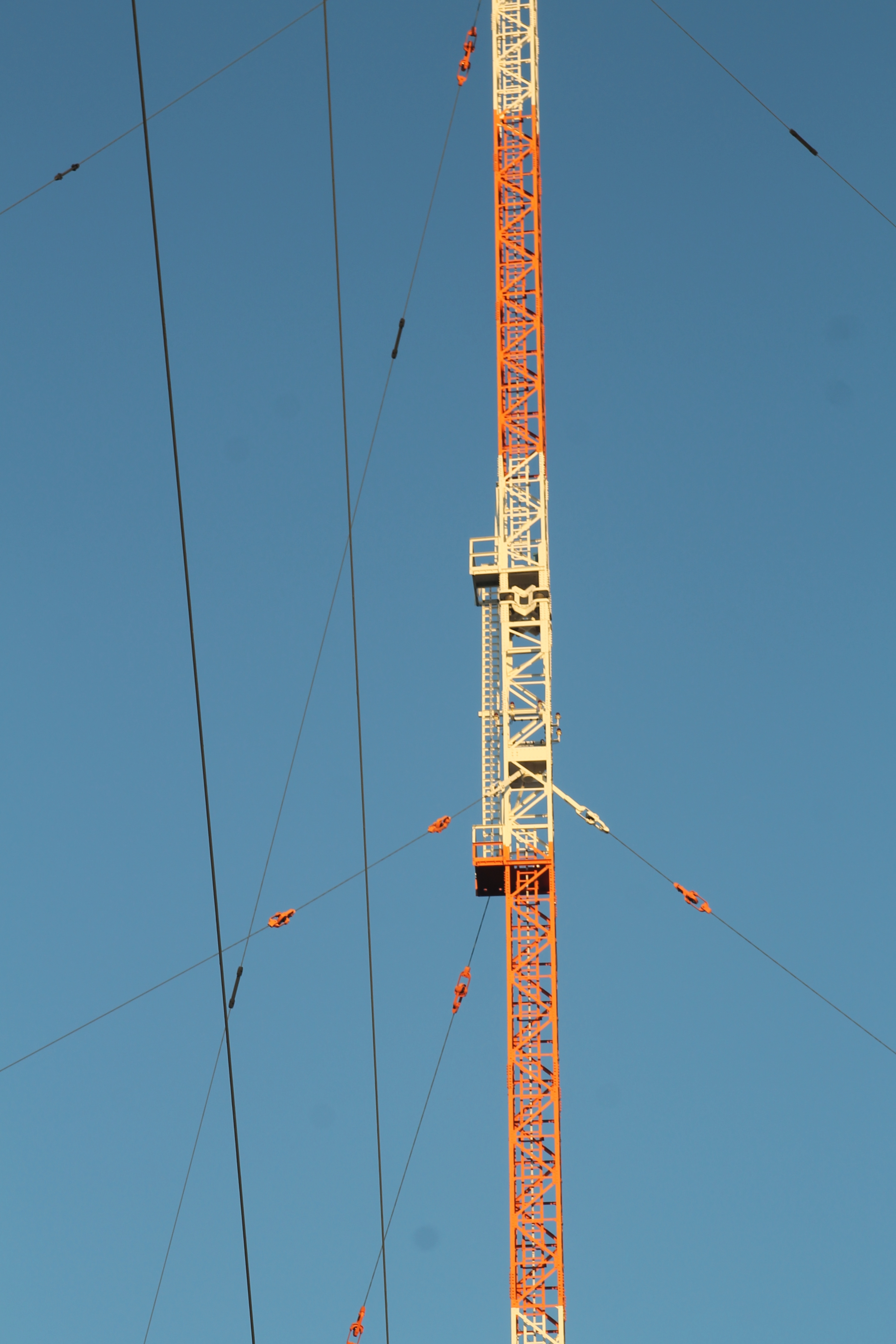
Site of now bridged intermediate insulator at older mast

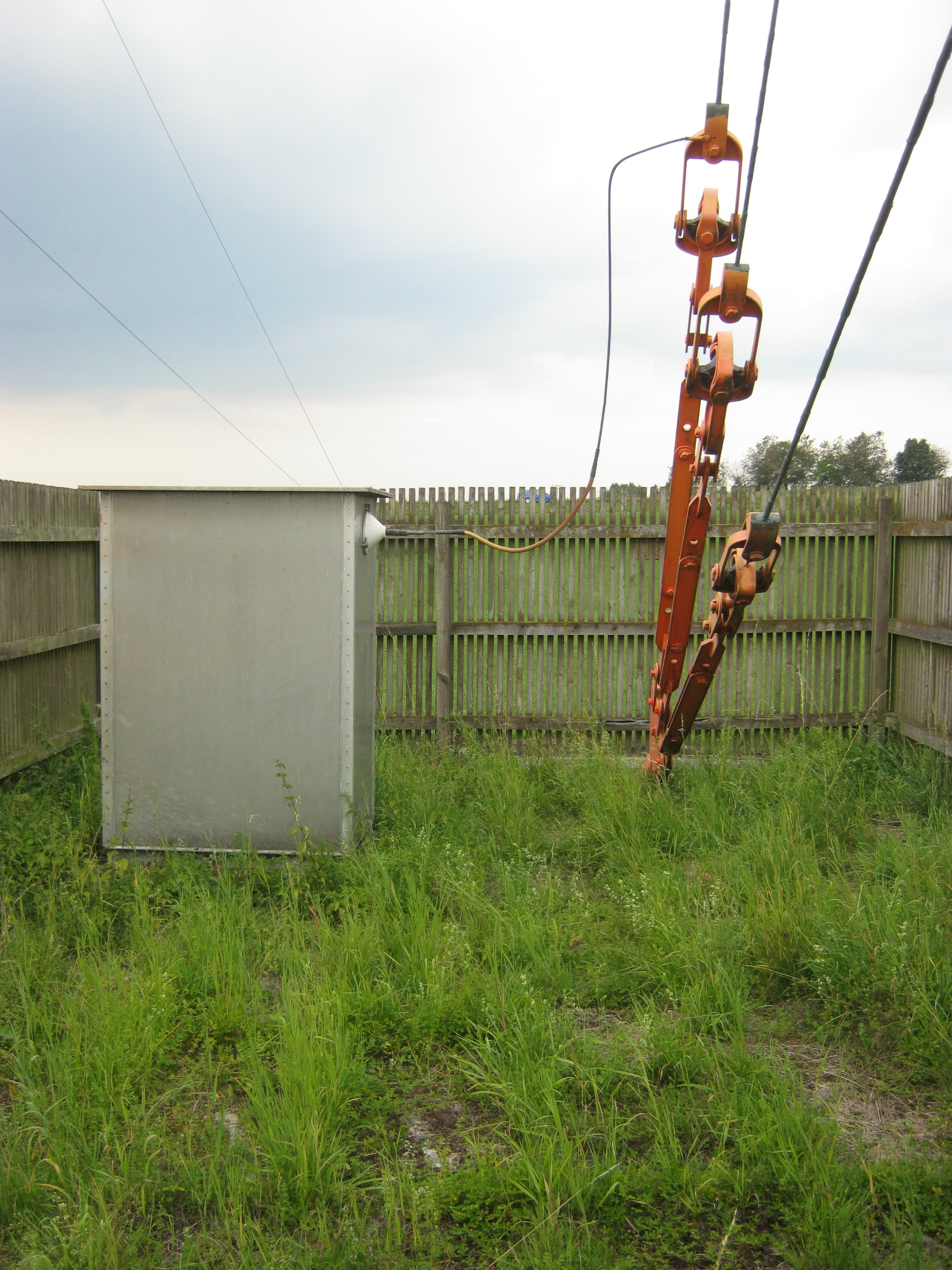
Basements of anchor points of older mast

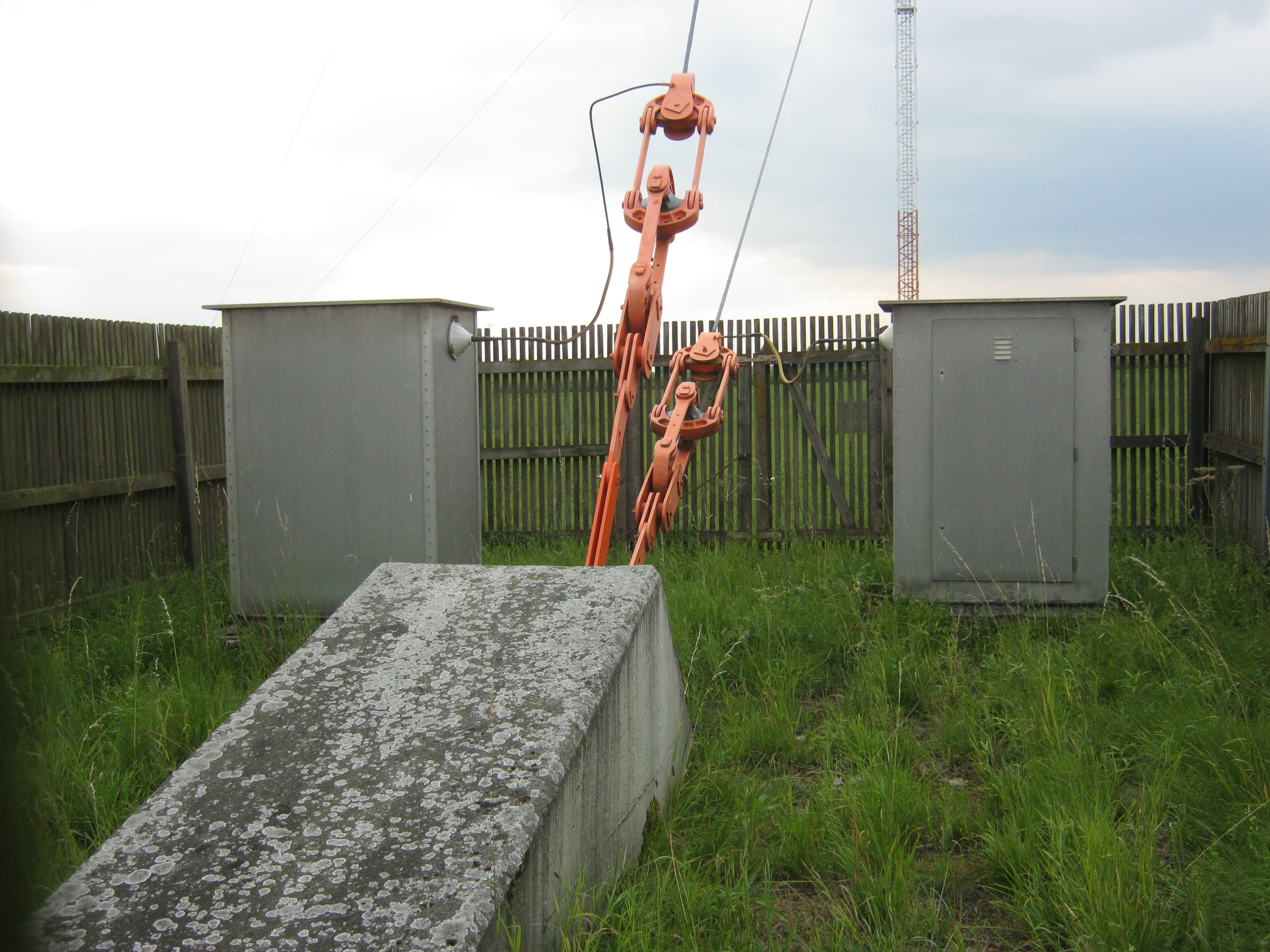
Basements of anchor points of newer mast
