= Gustav Rümelin =

German statistician, pedagogue and author (1815–1889)

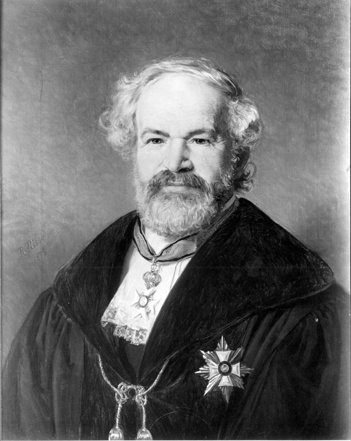
- by Roland Risse
- Born: 26 March 1815; Ravensburg
- Died: 28 October 1889 (aged 74); Tübingen

Gustav Rümelin (26 March 1815 – 28 October 1889) was a German statistician, pedagogue and author.

== Biography ==
Rümelin was born in Ravensburg. After studying theology at Tübingen, he devoted himself to teaching, became rector of a Latin school in 1845, and became professor at the gymnasium of Heilbronn in 1849, having in the meanwhile been a delegate to the Frankfurt Parliament in 1848. Called to Stuttgart in 1850 to serve in the Board of National Education, he was head of a department in the Ministry of Public Instruction from 1856 to 1861, when he became director of the Statistic-Topographical Bureau. In 1867 he established himself as docent at the University of Tübingen and was appointed its chancellor in 1870. Aside from various statistical and miscellaneous publications, he produced Shakespeare-Studien (2d ed. 1874), a much valued contribution to the Shakespeare literature. He died in Tübingen.

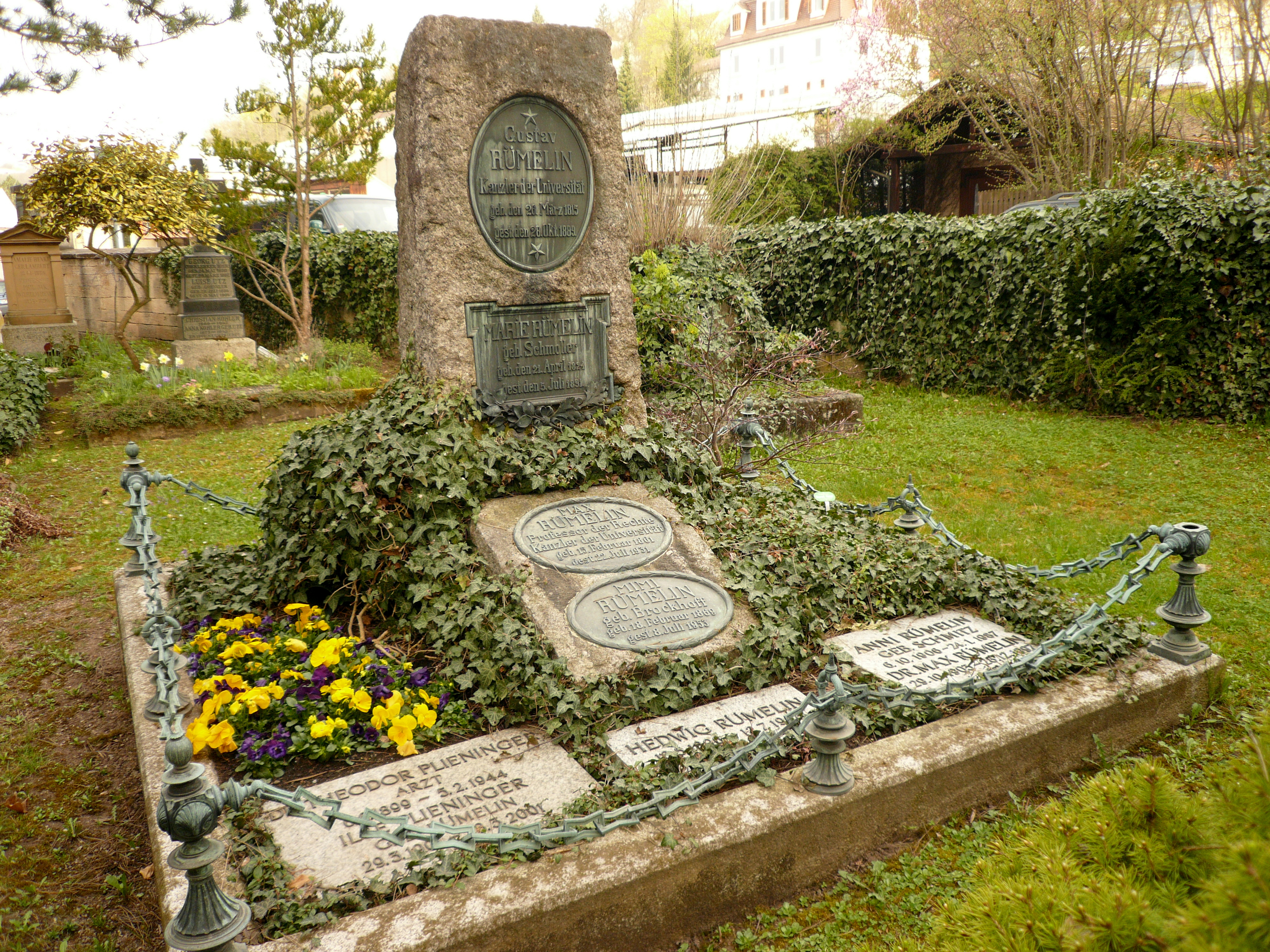
Gustav Rümelin grave in the Tübingen city cemetery
