= Sender Donebach =

Donebach transmitter, Mast 2
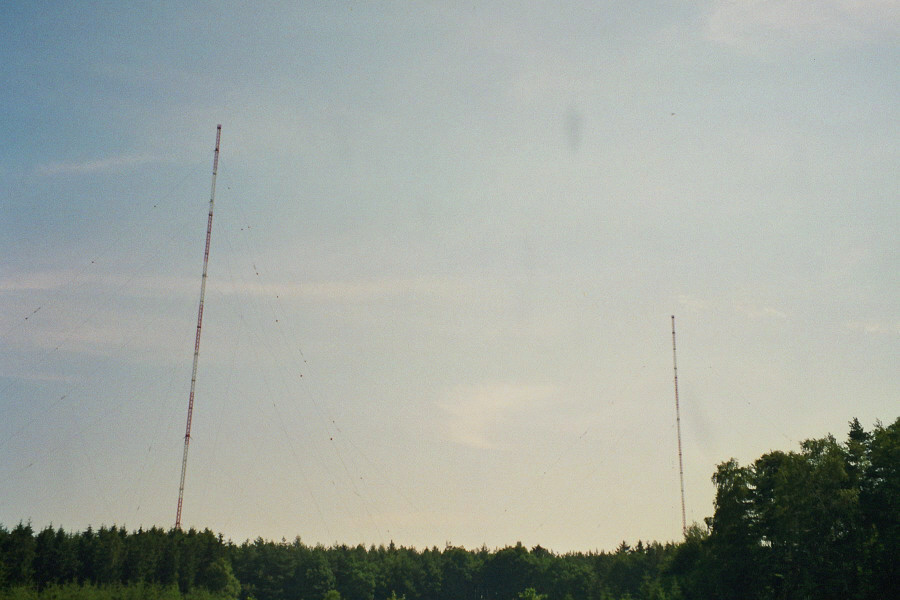
- Donebach Radio Masts

General information
- Status: shutdown in 2014 and demolished in 2018
- Type: grounded upfed mast radiator
- Location: Donebach, Baden-Württemberg, Germany
- Coordinates: 49°33′43″N 9°10′28″E
- Completed: 1982
- Demolished: 02.03.2018
- Height: 363 m (1,191 ft)

Design and construction
- Main contractor: Deutsche Bundespost

The Sender Donebach was a 500-kilowatt long wave radio transmitter operating on 153 kHz and transmitting the program of German public broadcaster Deutschlandfunk. The facility, which was the property of Media Broadcast, was built between 1965 and 1967 on a former airfield, and entered service on March 10, 1967.

It was part of an omnidirectional aerial, consisting of four 200-metre-high radio masts, which were connected using wires on their tops. The middle mast was fed via radio power. This very efficient transmission aerial led to interference with the Romanian transmitter Braşov on the same frequency, so only 70 kilowatts of power were used, instead of 250. But even with this reduced power, interference to Braşov occurred, so in 1972 the radio facility Donebach was rebuilt as a directional aerial with a minimum towards Braşov. Therefore, two radio masts were taken down and the remaining two were rebuilt as umbrella aerials. This made a transmission power of 250 kilowatts possible.

The Geneva Frequency Plan of 1975 set new power limits to the Donebach transmitter and now there was a daytime operation with 500 kilowatts and a night time operation at night time.

This facility was remarkable because

- the frequency of the carrier was derived from a rubidium atomic clock, which was in the station building. It was as the carrier frequency of DCF77, a standard frequency.
- the 363-metre-high masts were the second tallest structures in Germany, just behind the Fernsehturm Berlin.

It was demolished in 2018.

== Geographical coordinates of the masts ==
- 49°33′36″N 9°10′55″E
- 49°33′43″N 9°10′28″E

== Roofing & Base-Jumping ==
This Antenna was a popular spot among climbers and Base-Jumpers.
