= Nordkirchen transmitter =

Medium wave broadcasting facility in Germany

Coordinates: 51.75544°N 7.53936°E

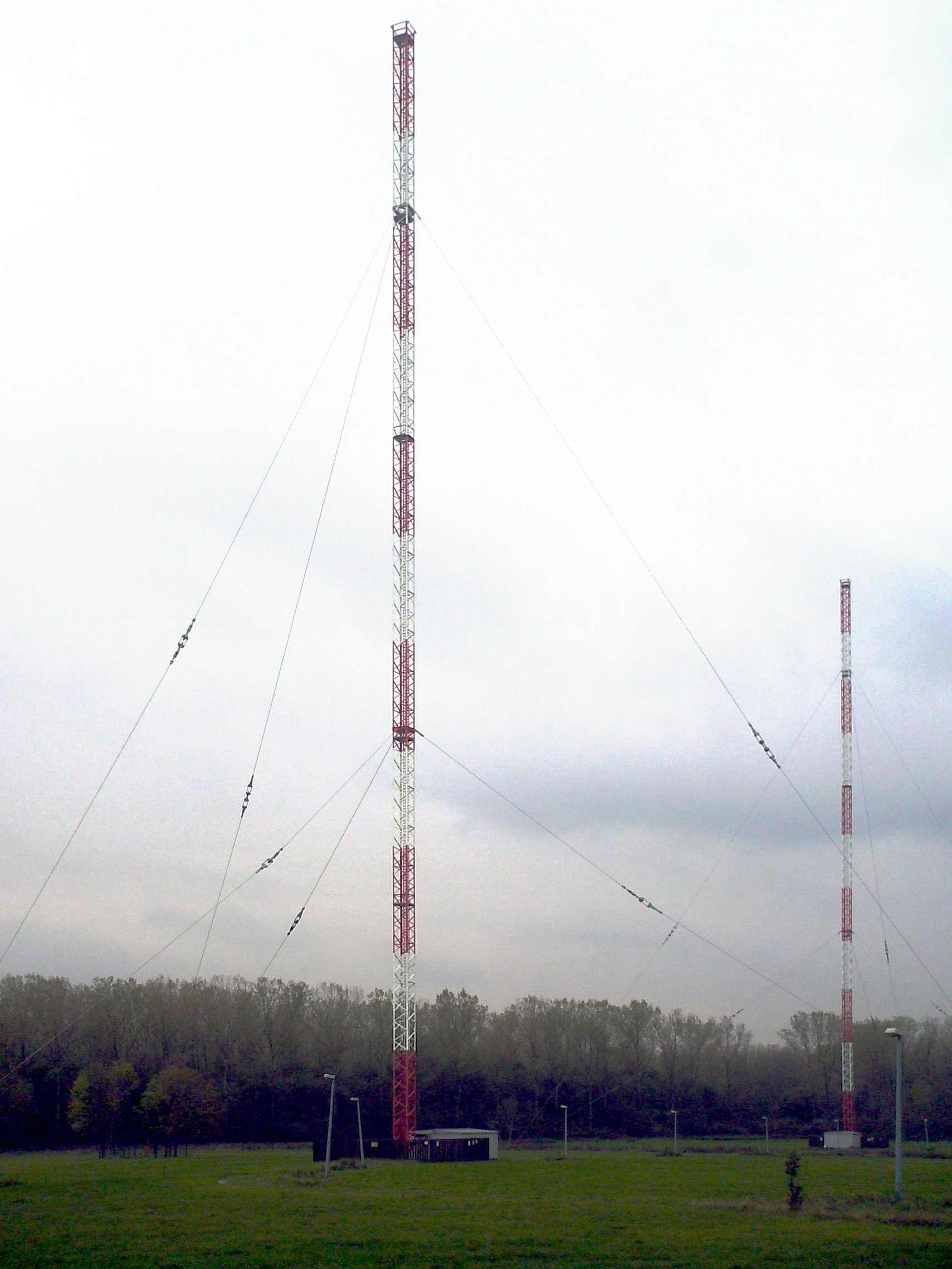
Nordkirchen transmitter in 2006

The Nordkirchen transmitter was a medium-wave broadcasting facility of Media Broadcast and former Deutsche Telekom near Nordkirchen in Northrhine-Westphalia, Germany. It was built in 1979 and 1980 after and finally de-funct in 2018.

== Transmitter ==
It transmitter had 100 kW power and uses a directional antenna on 549 kHz aimed at the Northeast, consisting of two ground-fed, guyed, lattice steel masts 136 metres apart. The power opposite the antenna's focal point was approximately one-third the total radiated power. This avoided conflicting with the nearby Wavre transmitter in Belgium, which works on the neighbouring 540 kHz frequency.

In 2004, a second medium-wave transmitter with a power of 5 kW for transmitting the privately owned radio programme Truckradio was installed at Nordkirchen transmitter, which uses the same antenna as the transmitter of Deutschlandfunk.

First the 5 kW transmitter got de-funct and later the main transmitter. In 2018 the facility got rebuild.
