= Deutschlandfunk =

German radio station

Coordinates: 50°54′10″N 6°57′34″E

- Cologne; Germany
- Broadcast area: National and international

Programming
- Language: German
- Format: News, speech

Ownership
- Owner: Deutschlandradio
- Sister stations: Deutschlandfunk Kultur, Deutschlandfunk Nova

History
- First air date: 1 January 1962; 64 years ago

Links
- Website: www.deutschlandfunk.de

Deutschlandfunk (DLF, German: [ˈdɔʏtʃlantˌfʊŋk] Broadcast Germany) is a public-broadcasting radio station in Germany, concentrating on news and current affairs. It is one of the four national radio channels produced by Deutschlandradio.

== History ==
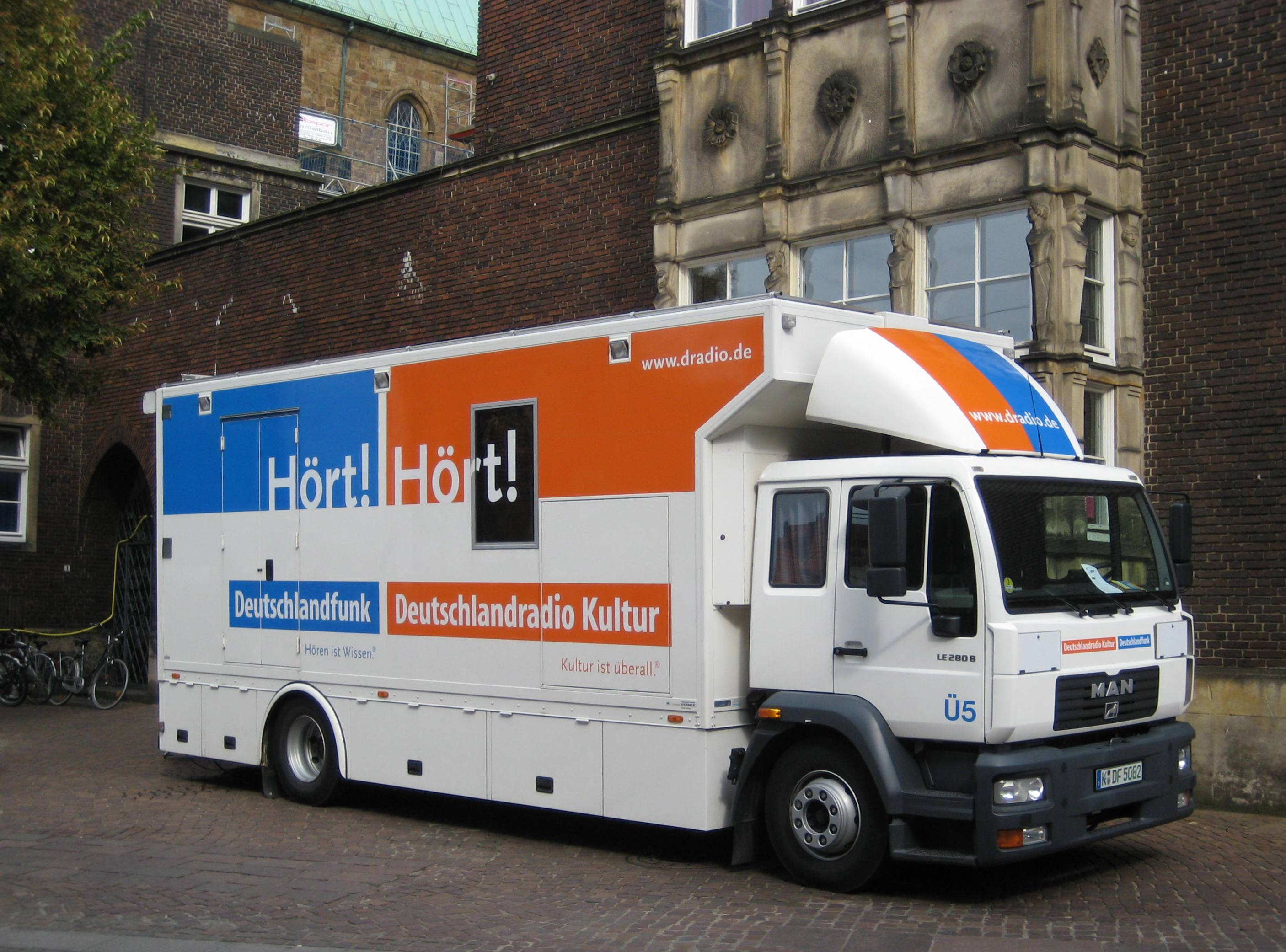
Deutschlandfunk Satellite truck in front of Glocke in Bremen

Broadcasting in the Federal Republic of Germany is reserved under the Basic Law (constitution) to the states. This means that all public broadcasting is regionalised. National broadcasts must be aired through the national consortium of regional public broadcasters (ARD) or authorized by a treaty negotiated between the states.

In the 1950s, the German Democratic Republic (GDR) began broadcasting its Deutschlandsender station on longwave. In response to this, the then-Nordwestdeutscher Rundfunk applied for a licence to operate a similar longwave service on behalf of the ARD. This was granted in 1956 and operated as Deutscher Langwellensender ("German Longwave Station").

On 29 November 1960, the federal government under Konrad Adenauer created Deutschlandfunk as a national broadcasting corporation based in Cologne. At the same time, the government's attempted creation of a national television channel under its direct control (later to become ZDF) prompted a complaint from several states to the Federal Constitutional Court regarding broadcasting powers. In the "First Broadcasting Judgement", handed down on 28 February 1961, the court held while that broadcasting to Germany was not a power granted to the federal government and therefore delegated to the states, broadcasting from Germany to other countries fell under the federal government's responsibility to conduct foreign affairs.

When Norddeutscher Rundfunk's licence to broadcast on longwave expired, the federal government acquired the frequencies for Deutschlandfunk and began transmissions on 1 January 1962, joining the ARD on 7 June.

Deutschlandfunk broadcast primarily in German, targeting the GDR and German-speaking minorities in Eastern Europe. However, its European Department was responsible for foreign-language transmissions to neighbouring countries in Europe, primarily from the Ehndorf transmitter. From 7 June 1963 it began foreign language transmissions in Czech, Croatian, Polish and Serbian. Later it focused on the Federal Republic's neighbours in northern Europe, including English programming for Ireland and the UK. Inter-continental broadcasts were the responsibility of Deutsche Welle. Back in 1989, also news on the half-hour were placed next to the hourly news.

=== Post-reunification ===
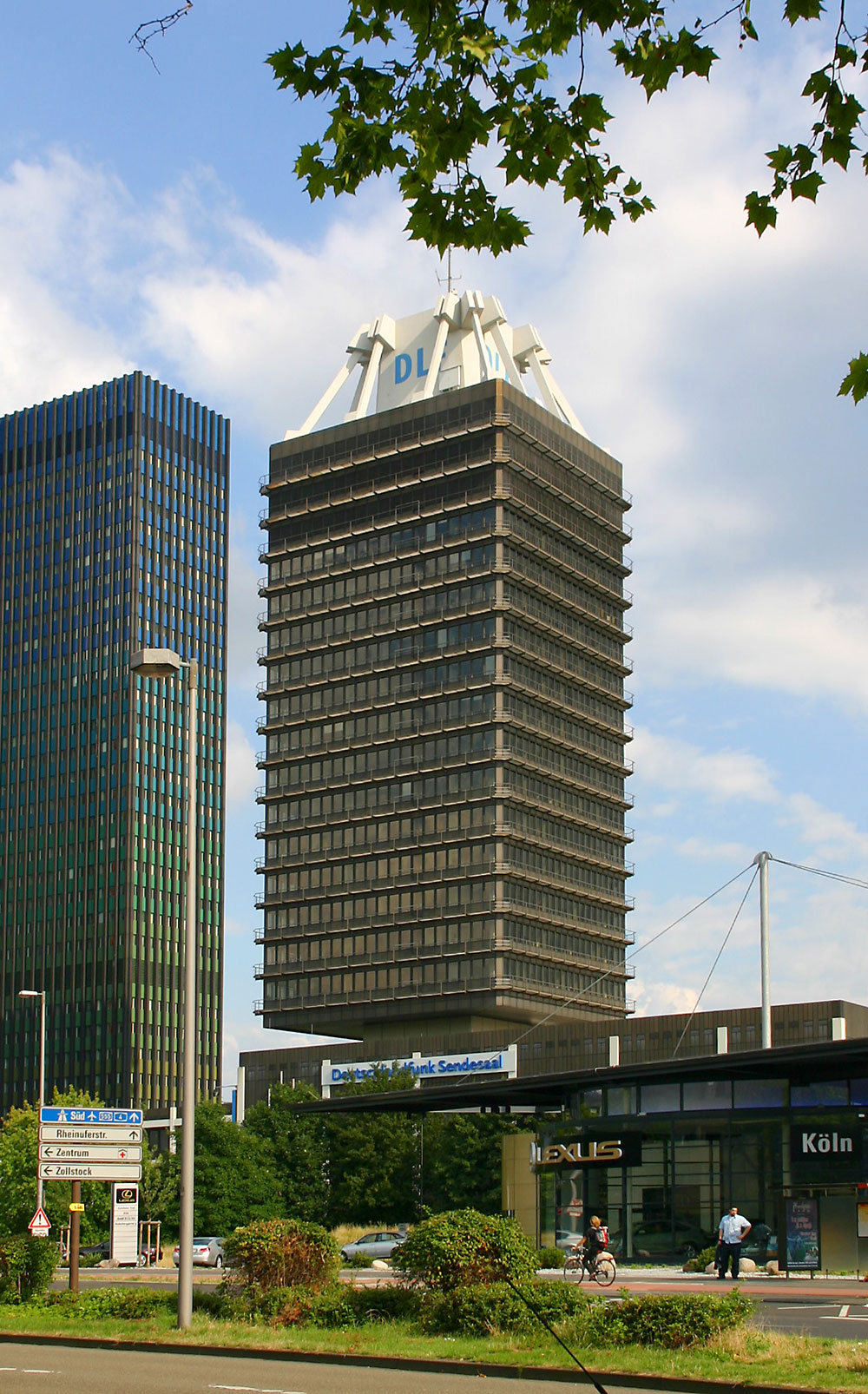
Deutschlandfunk headquarters in Cologne, Germany

After reunification, negotiations between the states and the Federal Government led to a reorganization of Germany's national and international public broadcasters in which DLF lost its independence and ARD membership.

On 1 July 1993, DLF's European Department was transferred to Deutsche Welle. DLF English programmes were phased out over several years and replaced by DW's intercontinental programmes.

The rest of DLF was merged into Deutschlandradio ("Germany Radio"), a public broadcasting institution created to oversee national services, from 1 January 1994. DLF was given a new remit as a news and current affairs service, while retaining its staff and studio facilities in Cologne. The service remains free of advertising. In the years immediately after the merger it was sometimes referred to as DeutschlandRadio Köln ("Germany Radio Cologne").

Deutschlandradio developed its service and beside of Deutschlandfunk (mainly news and information) and Deutschlandfunk Kultur (culture in a broader sense) they started Deutschlandfunk Nova, which is also based on production from Deutschlandfunk and targets young adults, mainly with spoken-word. The Dokumente und Debatten is an opt-out channel, often for special events and significant parliamentary debates.

== Programming ==
Deutschlandfunk's schedules are largely made up of news and documentaries, covering politics, economics and science. Music is also aired, especially during nighttime and weekend hours, it can account for half of the airtime.

=== News ===
Deutschlandfunk broadcasts a news bulletin every half hour weekdays between 04:00 and 18:00, and every hour at all other times (except Saturday at 21:00). In even-numbered hours between 06:00 and 20:00; every day at 13:00 and weekdays at 23:00, the bulletins can last up to 10 minutes; and 5 minutes at all other times.

On weekdays, the morning news magazine Informationen am Morgen is broadcast between 05:00 and 09:00, with frequent news bulletins. News magazines are also broadcast between 12:00 and 13:30 (Informationen am Mittag), and between 18:00 and 18:40 (Informationen am Abend). The main evening bulletin (Das war der Tag ("That was the Day")) is from 23:10 to 23:57. Selections from German and international newspaper commentaries are interspersed in the morning, noon, and midnight news magazines.

=== Culture ===
On Sundays, a discussion programme called Essay und Diskurs is broadcast between 09:30 and 10:00, covering subjects as varied as Islam in Germany, neurophysiology and the history of art. These discussions are archived on the internet.

=== International cooperation ===
Deutschlandfunk provides programming for the German-language Belgian radio station BRF-DLF in Brussels. It also cooperates with the main Belgischer Rundfunk (BRF) domestic radio service for the East Cantons of Walonia, BRF1.

== Technologies ==
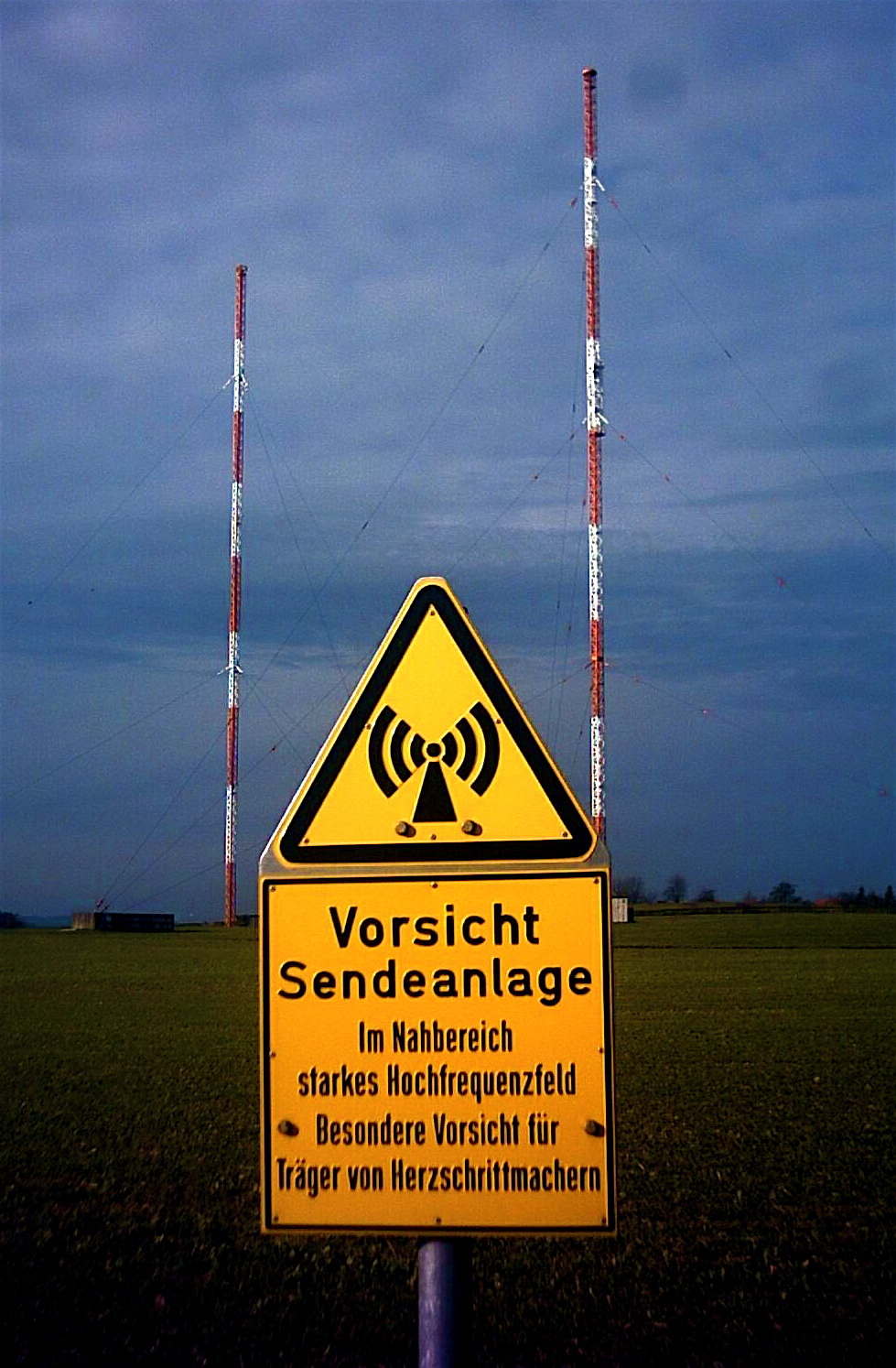
Ravensburg-Horgenzell transmitter

Deutschlandfunk broadcasts on FM, DAB+, and broadcast digitally via the Astra satellite system and used in the German and some European cable television systems.

Until the Geneva Frequency Plan of 1975 came into effect on 23 November 1978, Deutschlandfunk was transmitted on longwave from Sender Donebach and on mediumwave from Bad Dürrheim, Cremlingen, Ravensburg, Ehndorf, and Mainflingen. With implementation of the plan Bad Dürrheim was shut down. In 1979 new transmitters came into service: in Erching for daytime longwave transmission and in 1980/81 in Nordkirchen and Thurnau for mediumwave transmission.

On 1 January 1989 the Aholming transmitter replaced Erching and allowed 24-hour service on the second longwave frequency. On 1 October 1994 Heusweiler transmitter, which had previously transmitted "Europawelle Saar", began transmitting Deutschlandfunk. On 31 December 1994 Mainflingen transmitter was shut down. On 31 December 2014 longwave transmissions from Donebach on 153 kHz and Aholming on 207 kHz ceased, although Donebach 153 kHz continued into the early hours of 1 January 2015 before being shut down. On 31 December 2015 all remaining medium wave transmissions ceased at 2350 CET.

=== FM ===
FM transmitters broadcast Deutschlandfunk signal throughout Germany but there are gaps in coverage, especially — but not only — in the southern states of Bavaria and Baden-Württemberg. As the state authorities have the power to allocate frequencies to broadcasters, they give preference to the regional public and commercial broadcasters under their jurisdiction.

=== Streaming ===
Several streams of Deutschlandfunk are available in MP3, AAC and Opus formats.

The radio station is available on the apps for Android and iOS. There are two options: 1. Live stream 2. Catchup of the latest news summary.

== Mainflingen transmitter ==
The Mainflingen mediumwave transmitter (Mainflingen B) is a mediumwave transmission facility south of the A3 motorway near Mainflingen, Hesse, Germany. Mainflingen was the first mediumwave transmitter for the radio station Deutschlandfunk. It went into service in 1962 with a transmission power of 50 kW, on a frequency of 1538 kHz, at the upper end of the mediumwave band. This frequency has a bad groundwave propagation and therefore a low range at daytime, but an excellent skywave propagation with a long range at night.

In December 1962 the transmission power of Mainflingen was increased to 300 kW. Until 1967 its antenna was on the same site as the Mainflingen longwave transmitters. This resulted in interference problems, which made the desired further increase of transmission power impossible. A new transmitter, with a directional and an omnidirecional antenna, was built in the mid-1960s on a site south of the A3, at a distance great enough from the longwave transmitters that even when using a power of 1000 kW, no greater interference problems would occur. This facility went into service on 1 January 1967.

The directional and the omnidirectional antennas were somewhat unusual for mediumwave broadcasting antennas. The omnidirectional antenna consisted of a ground-fed 142-metre-tall guyed mast, carrying a double conical cage antenna with a diameter of 64 metres. This construction allowed its usage for all mediumwave frequencies, and therefore also as backup antenna for Deutschlandfunk's mediumwave transmitters at other sites. The directional antenna consisted of two horizontal dipoles which were mounted on 4.85-metre-tall guyed masts at a height of 75 metres, with a radiation maximum showing in northeast and southwest direction. As the omnidirectional antenna could not be used for the full available transmission power of 700 kW, in 1974 a 95-metre-tall guyed ground-fed mast radiator was built. A transmission power of 1050 kW was also possible by switching the third backup transmitter in parallel, but for economical reasons was never used. The transmitter was now run during the day with 700 kW and omnidirectional radiation, and at night with 350 kW and directional radiation, and was also used in the evenings for transmitting English-language programmes.

The introduction of the wave plan of Geneva resulted in an increase of the transmission frequency from 1538 kHz to 1539 kHz. Mainflingen's daily operation mode was not affected. However, according to the wave plan, it was no longer allowed to use the double conical antenna as backup antenna for Deutschlandfunk's other mediumwave transmitters. The regulations of the wave plan of Geneva do not normally allow operation of backup transmitters more than 50 kilometres away from the standard site without special coordinative measures. This antenna was therefore dismantled in 1982.

After 1 March 1983 Deutschlandfunk was also broadcast at night using omnidirectional radiation, and the four masts of the directional antenna was dismantled afterwards. From 1 April 1988 the transmission power was reduced to 350 kW. Beside the bad groundwave propagation of the used frequency, broadcasts from the transmitter were only sufficiently well-received during daytime, despite the high power output. This resulted in a shut-down of the transmitter on 31 December 1994, some years after the cancellation of foreign language transmissions.

As a replacement, Saarländischer Rundfunk's Heusweiler transmitter was leased. It was first planned to demolish the Mainflingen facility, but on 1 April 1996 Evangeliums-Rundfunk (ERF), a religious broadcaster, which already hired transmission time at Trans World Radio restarted its operation.

Several disputes between Deutsche Telekom and the Mainhausen municipality occurred, as after the relaunch, problems with electromagnetic influence of electric devices were reported. Local residents were therefore opposed to continued use of the transmitter. In 1998 it was decided that the site could be used for mediumwave transmission and modernization of the facility started. First the old transmitter was replaced by a new, fully transistorized transmitter, which would be also able to operate in DRM mode.

In order to allow a good night-time transmission without causing too many problems with electromagnetic influence, a cross-dipole antenna with a radiation maximum pointing vertically into the sky was built in early 2006. This antenna, which is one of the few applications of circular polarisation for broadcasting, is mounted on 5 guyed masts. The central mast of this antenna is grounded. It carries the feeder cables running to the dipole, while the masts at the edge are standing on insulators and grounded via inductances in such way that they radiate as low a frequency as possible. In this way, undesired parasitic radiations, which are the cause of electromagnetic influence, are suppressed. The radiated wave must be right-hand polarized, otherwise the signal reflected on the ionosphere would be 20 dB less strong. In spring 2006 this new antenna went into service. It is used only for night-time transmissions, as the desired ionospheric reflection occurs only at night. During the day the old mast is used.
