= List of radio stations in the Czech Republic =

The following is a list of radio stations in the Czech Republic.

== List of radios ==
- Český rozhlas or ČRo is the state public radio broadcaster of the Czech Republic.
  - Český rozhlas Radiožurnál (music, news and information)
  - Český rozhlas Dvojka (talk and family programmes)
  - Český rozhlas Vltava (culture, art and classical music)
  - Český rozhlas Radiožurnál Sport (sporting events, thematic magazines, interviews and reports)
  - Český rozhlas Radio Wave (youth radio via cable, digital, and internet only)
  - Český rozhlas Plus (spoken-word, journalism)
  - Český Rozhlas Region (regional radio with 14 regional channels)
    - Český rozhlas Ostrava
    - Český rozhlas Olomouc
    - Český rozhlas Zlín
    - Český rozhlas Brno
    - Český rozhlas Vysočina
    - Český rozhlas Pardubice
    - Český rozhlas Hradec Králové
    - Český rozhlas České Budějovice
    - Český rozhlas Sever
    - Český rozhlas Liberec
    - Český rozhlas Plzeň
    - Český rozhlas Karlovy Vary
    - Český rozhlas Střední Čechy
    - Český rozhlas Rádio Praha
  - Radio Prague International (external broadcasts in six languages)
  - Český rozhlas Jazz (jazz music)
  - ČRo D-dur (classic music)
  - Český rozhlas Rádio Junior (children's radio)
  - Český rozhlas Rádio Junior písničky (songs for kids)
- BBC World Service
- Classic Praha
- Country Radio
- Evropa 2
- Fajn Radio
- Frekvence 1
- Hitrádio Černá Hora
- Hitrádio Faktor
- Hitrádio FM Plus
- Hitrádio Orion
- Hitrádio North Music
- Radio 1 Praha
- Radio Beat
- Rádio Blaník
- Radio Čas
- Radio Čas Rock
- Radio Impuls
- Rádio Český Impuls
- Radio Proglas
- Radio Kiss
- Rock Radio
- RockZone

=== Defunct ===
- ČRo 6 (spoken radio)
- Český rozhlas Rádio Česko (spoken radio)
- Český rozhlas Leonardo (science)
- Český rozhlas Rádio Retro - historical archived programmes
- Hitrádio Dragon

== See also ==
- Czech Radio
- List of radio stations in Europe
