= ČRo Plus =

- Prague; Czech Republic
- Broadcast area: Czech Republic also will be receiving radio in: Slovakia; Poland; Austria; Germany
- Frequencies: FM: 92,6 MHz (Prague), various in the whole country DAB+: Block 12C (Prague), various blocks

Programming
- Language: Czech
- Format: Spoken-word, Journalism

Ownership
- Owner: Český rozhlas

History
- First air date: 1 March 2013; 13 years ago

Links
- Website: plus.rozhlas.cz

ČRo Plus is a radio station of the Czech Radio in the Czech Republic. It is full-screen spoken-word station, focused on analytical journalism. It was founded in 2013, when it replaced the trio of stations ČRo 6, ČRo Rádio Česko and ČRo Leonardo. Czech Radio claims that the station is aimed towards listeners over the age of 35.

For its nature, the radio station bears similarities with its foreign counterparts; BBC Radio 4 and B5 aktuell. As of the first quarter of 2023, 144,000 listeners listened to the station daily.

== History ==
The station started broadcasting on 1 March 2013. On 27 March 2013 (less than a month after the start of the broadcast), the Czech Radio Council recommended to Czech Radio to extend the station's broadcasting hours from the current 4pm to midnight.

From 3 June 2013, Plus started broadcasting digitally, 24 hours a day. Until then, it shared the position with ČRo Jazz. From 2 November 2015, ČRo Plus began broadcasting live on VHF frequencies 24 hours a day, 7 days a week, with news every 30 minutes.

On 31 December 2021, broadcasting of the Plus station on medium waves was terminated, along with Dvojka and Radiožurnál stations.

== Programming ==
The station has four thematic areas of analysis - politics, business, society and science. The station also broadcasts radio documentaries. Reporters use primary sources (such as call-ins), and content from foreign press such as Reuters. News bulletins are often short, with big news blocks coming in at noon and 6pm. Modeled on Radio Free Europe and Radio Prague International, the station also broadcasts short five-minute long news bulletins in English after 1am.

Despite the Leonardo station closing down in 2013, the station's content has been remodelled into a 26-minute magazine of the same name which is essentially a summary of events in the field of science.

== Broadcasting ==
The platforms on which the station broadcasts are VHF, internet, digital networks (DVB-T2, DVB-S2, DVB-C), digital radio DAB+ and mobile phone applications. Since November 2015, the station has been broadcasting an extended programme on VHF.
