= Topolná transmitter =

- Radiokomunikační středisko Topolná
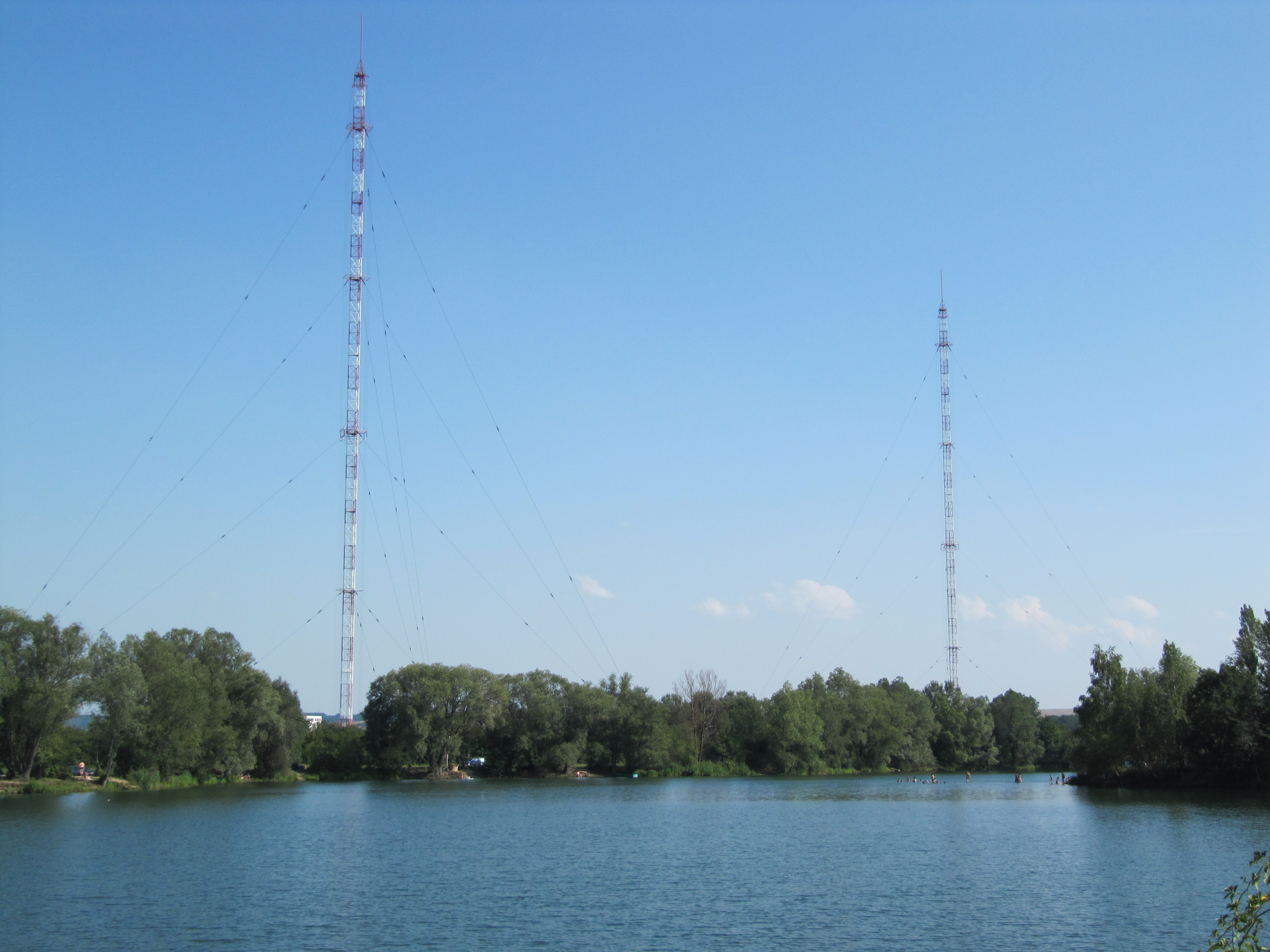

General information
- Location: Uherské Hradiště District, Zlín Region, Czech Republic
- Coordinates: 49°07′25″N 17°30′52″E
- Completed: 1952

The Topolná transmitter (Czech: Radiokomunikační středisko Topolná) was a longwave broadcasting facility of the Czech Republic situated in the municipality of Topolná near the Morava River. Constructed in the early 1950s, it was the central longwave center and used for broadcasting until the end of 2021. The masts were blasted down in 2022.

== History ==
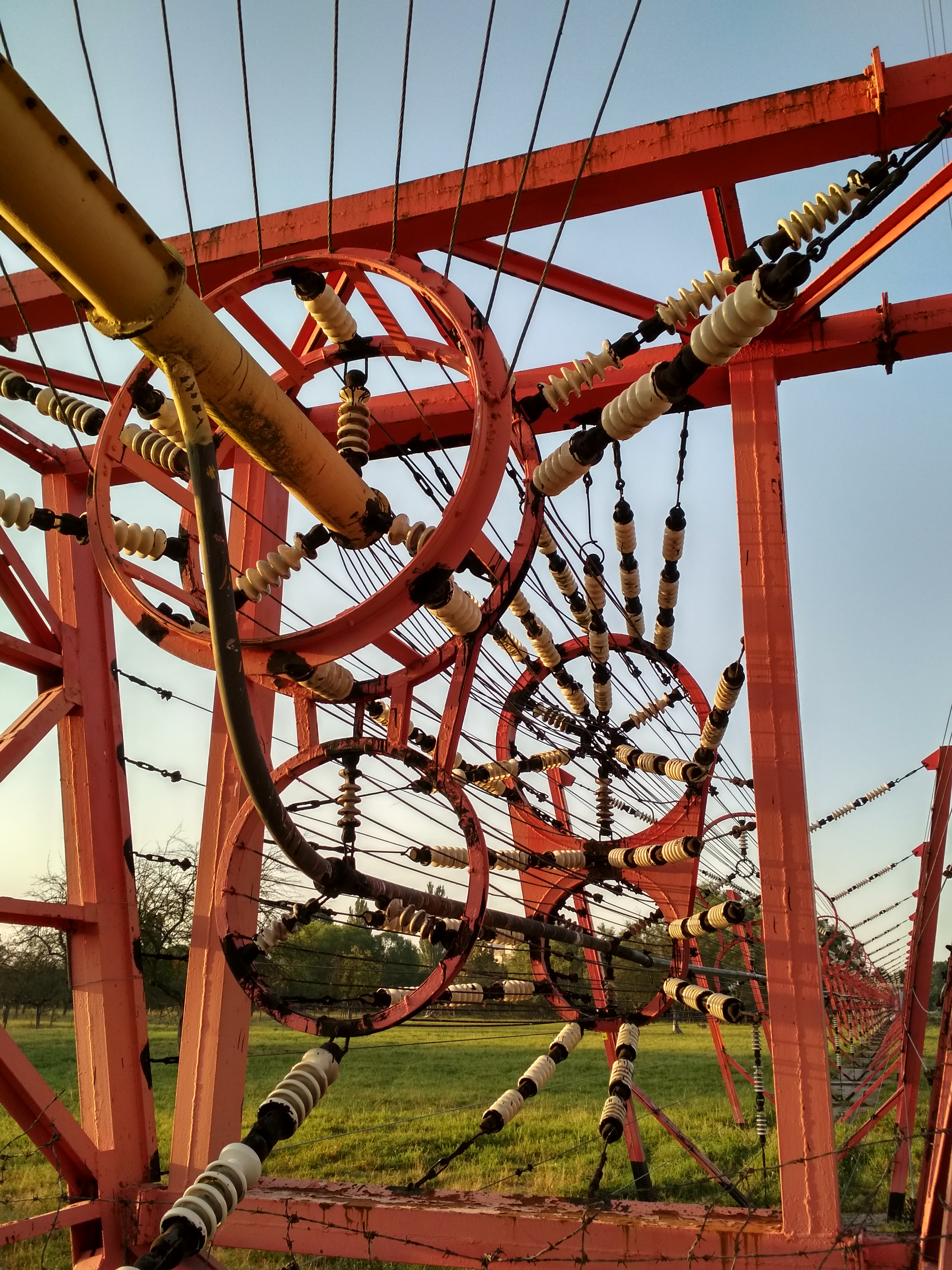
Connecting lines between radio operating centre and transmitter mast

The longwave frequency 272 kHz was assigned to Czechoslovakia in the Copenhagen Frequency Plan of 1948. It had previously been used by German Deutschlandsender during World War II.

The construction of a transmitter began in 1950 by Czech state broadcaster and was completed in December 1951. The two 257m steel lattice transmission masts were built by the state-owned company "Hutní montáze Ostrava". Tests lasted until February 1952. Its power output was 400 kW (2x 200 kW). In its first broadcasts it was transmitting the radio programme "Československo 1", later "Hvězda".

From 1957–1958 Topolná was also used to transmit a Hungarian radio programme on 49 meter wavelength. From 1953–1960 and again from 1969–1973 one of its masts was used for transmission on frequency 173 kHz. In 1972, the Czechoslovak Federal Government in Prague adopted "Decision No. 228", which provided for a comprehensive modernization of the transmitter network and modulation lines. Between 1975 and 1978, Topolná underwent a major modernization and had to be temporarily shut down. As a replacement, some Czech medium wave transmitters were switched to 272 kHz. On November 15, 1978, the completely renewed Topolná transmitter went back on air with two 750 kW transmitter blocks of the type "Tesla DRV 750", which, when combined, brought it up to 1500 kW.

On 1 October 1989 the frequency was changed to 270 kHz. After the Velvet Revolution in 1989 the broadcast programme was renamed from "Hvězda" to "Radiožurnál". In January 1994 one of the masts was switched off to cut costs, reducing the output power to 750 kW. Further reduction of output power followed in January 2002, to 650 kW. As there were very few other transmitters working on the frequency 270 kHz its programme ("ČRo Radiožurnál") was clearly received across the whole of Europe, especially during the night.

Since the mid-2000s Czech Radio has announced its intention to close down the transmitter several times. In late 2013 it was announced that the broadcasts would cease on 28 February 2014. The transmitter was switched off on 31. December 2021. On 28. July 2022 both masts were demolished.

== Construction details ==
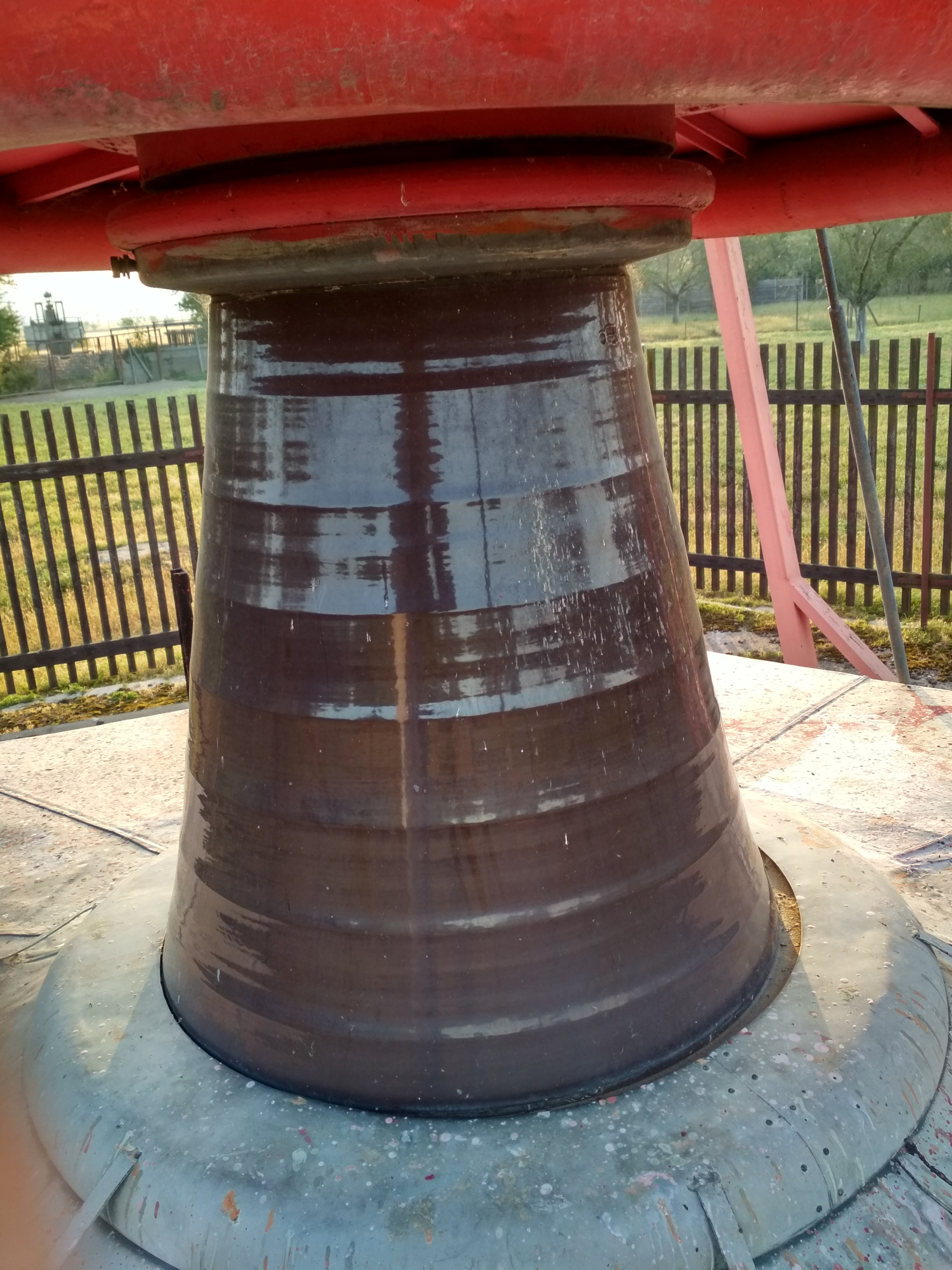
This 1m-high ceramic barrel with about 60 cm diameter carries whole mast (also used as ground isolation).

Topolná used a directional antenna, whose maxima point in an East–West direction. This radiation pattern ensured that the Topolná transmitter can be received clearly in all parts of the Czech Republic and Slovakia.

To create this directional antenna pattern two 257 metres (843 ft) tall guyed lattice steel masts were used. Until the mid-1970s these masts were used as ground-fed mast radiators and are therefore insulated against the ground. In the mid-1970s the transmission power was increased to 1500 kW, making the Topolná transmitter one of the most powerful transmitters in Europe. By this measure, both masts were equipped with cage wire antennas, which made their electrical insulation against the ground obsolete. After the installation of these cage antennas the basement insulators were bridged, but remained in place.

As in other high power transmission facilities in Central and Eastern Europe, the Topolná transmitter used special overhead lines to transmit the RF-power from the transmitter building to the masts.
