= Jaroslav Záruba =

Czech military officer (1907–1945)

- Born: 26 April 1907; Třeboň, Bohemia, Austria-Hungary
- Died: 10 May 1945 (aged 38); Prague, Czechoslovakia
- Alma mater: Charles University in Prague
- Military career
- Allegiance: Czechoslovakia (1928–1939); Protectorate of Bohemia and Moravia (1939–1945)
- Service years: 1928–1945
- Rank: Major
- Awards: State Defense Cross

Jaroslav Záruba (26 April 1907 – 10 May 1945) was a Czech officer in the Government Army of the Protectorate of Bohemia and Moravia who commanded Czech forces during the Prague uprising.

In 1928, after graduating from Charles University, Záruba joined the Czechoslovak Army. He was reassigned to the 1st Battalion of the Government Army following the occupation of the Czech lands on the eve of World War II. In 1945, during the Prague uprising, he led a force of Government Army troops, police, and partisans in the defense of the Czech Radio center and helped clear the building and surrounding area of Waffen SS who had laid siege to it.

== Early life and education ==
Jaroslav Záruba was born on 26 April 1907 in Třeboň and graduated from Charles University in Prague, where he studied law. In 1928, he joined the Czechoslovak Army. He received his commission following training at the Hranice Military Academy.

== Career ==
Záruba served as an infantry officer in the Czechoslovak Army and, by 1939, was a company commander in the 21st Infantry Regiment, garrisoned in Čáslav. Following the German occupation of the Czech lands, Záruba was reassigned as a company commander in the 1st Battalion of the Government Army. By the spring of 1945, the 1st Battalion was the only element of the Government Army still inside the Czech lands, with all other battalions having been deployed by the Protector, Wilhelm Frick, to assist German forces then engaged in Italy.

On 5 May 1945, Czech Radio staff took control of the Czech Radio broadcasting center, commandeering its equipment to transmit an appeal for a national uprising. German forces quickly stormed the building but were delayed in locating the newsroom due to the earlier removal of directional signage inside the labyrinthine structure. The insurgent radio staff used the delay to broadcast an appeal for armed assistance:

"We are calling on the Czech police, Czech gendarmes and the government's military forces to help Czech Radio."

At the 1st Battalion's barracks, Záruba was summoned by General Karel Pražák who told him "the hour of reckoning" had arrived. He was ordered by Pražák to lead a company of Government Army soldiers to clear the radio center of German forces and defend it from further attack. Záruba moved with his men to Czech Radio, infiltrating the top floors of the building via adjacent structures, while the bottom three floors remained secured by German forces. The Government Army — supported by the police and the Gendarmerie — ultimately drove the German forces into the building's basement, which was then flooded, forcing the Germans to surrender.

Early the next day, the Czech Radio building was bombed by a German Messerschmitt Me 262, destroying its transmitter. With the adjacent streets still held by a company-sized element of Waffen SS, however, Záruba and his men continued to use the damaged building as a center of operations. Around this time, the Czechs were joined by two British Army POWs, Thomas Vokes and William Grieg. Vokes and Grieg had earlier escaped Stalag VIII-B but had been stranded in Prague while attempting to travel west to reconnect with British forces. The two British soldiers proposed to Záruba that they accompany him to the German lines and pretend to represent advance elements of a non-existent unit that they would claim had parachuted into the country and was advancing against Prague. Záruba agreed to participate in the bluff and he, the two Britons, and two additional Czech soldiers approached the German command post at the Na Smetance school under a flag of truce. The German commander was taken in by the feint and, with Berlin itself on the verge of capitulation, agreed to surrender to Záruba late in the evening of May 7.

Following these events, Záruba supervised the construction of barricades intended to forestall the movement of German reinforcements into Prague. On 8 May, the day before the liberation of Prague by Marshal of the Soviet Union Ivan Konev, a position he was holding on Balbínova Street was hit in a German airstrike. Záruba was fatally wounded and died on 10 May 1945, aged 38.

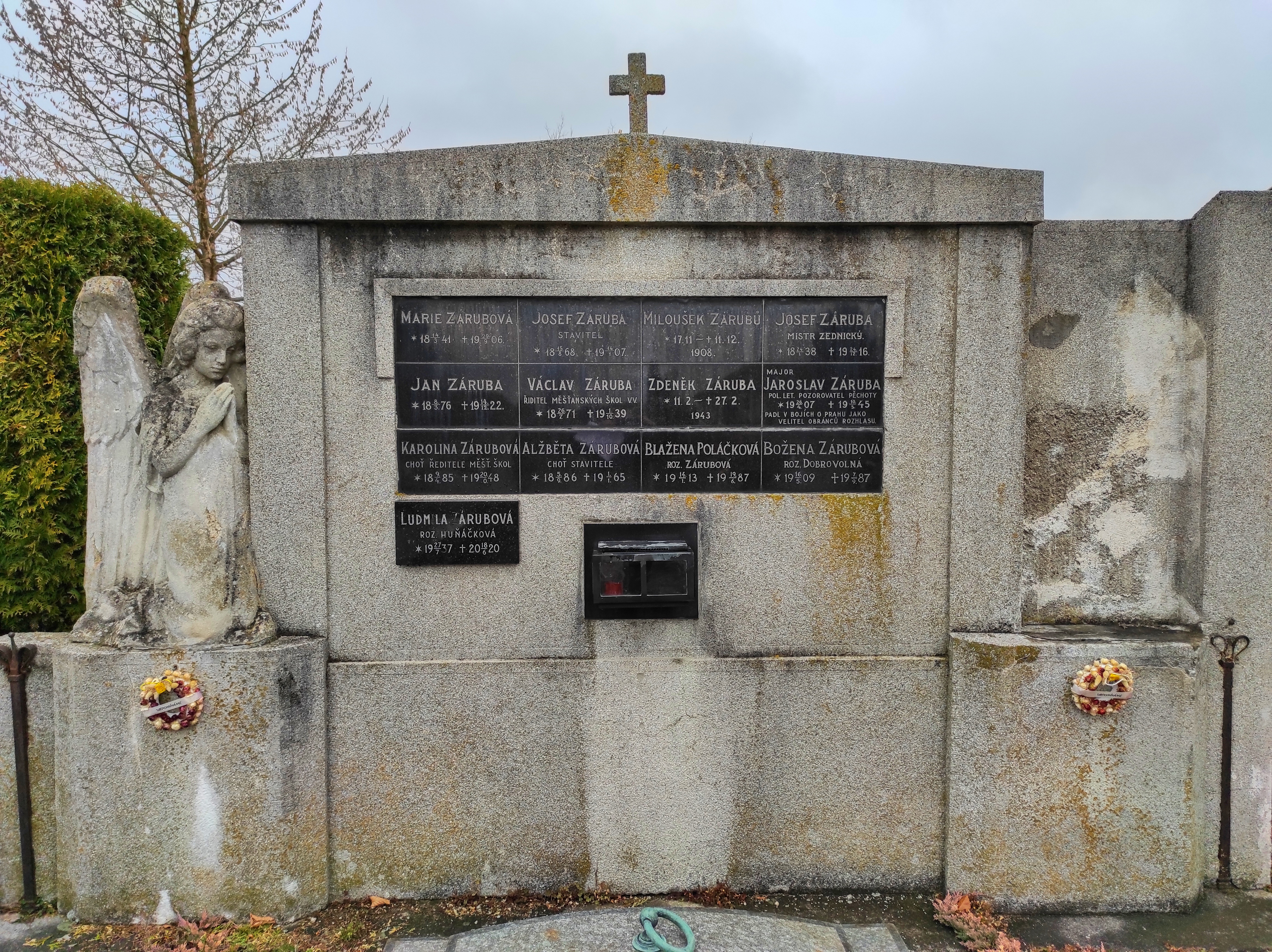
The Záruba family tomb in Třeboň

== Legacy ==
Záruba was initially interred at Olšany Cemetery but was later reinterred in the family tomb in Třeboň. He was posthumously promoted to major and posthumously decorated with the State Defense Cross. A plaque at the Czech Radio building commemorates Záruba.

== See also ==
- Jaroslav Eminger, inspector-general of the Government Army
- Battle for Czech Radio
