= St. Nicholas Church (Staré Město) =

Coordinates: 50.0878°N 14.4199°E

St Nicholas Church
- The Church of Saint Nicholas
- Kostel svatého Mikuláše
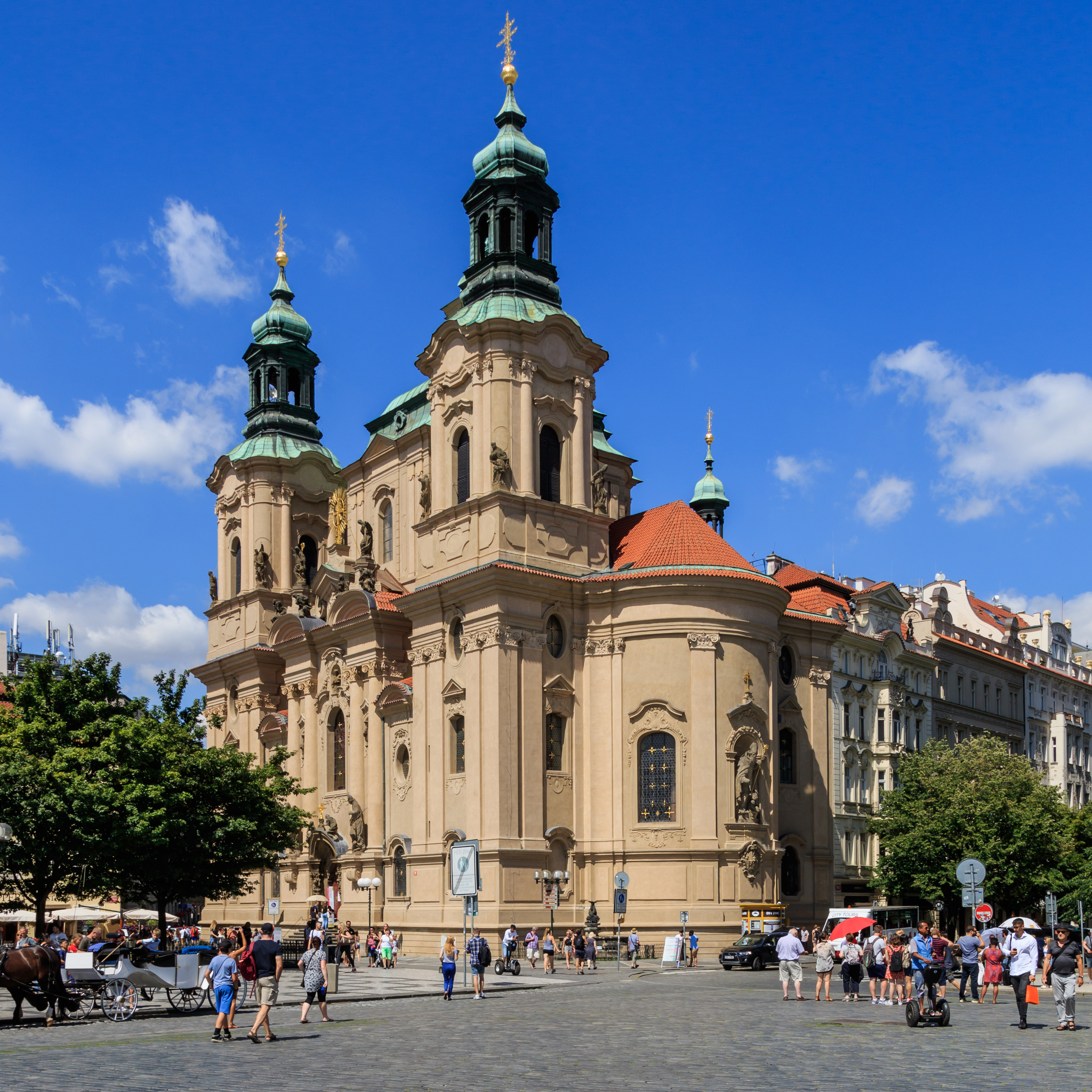
- St Nicholas Church
- Location: Prague
- Country: Czech Republic
- Denomination: Hussite
- Previous denomination: Roman Catholic
- Website: Website of the Church

History
- Status: Active
- Founded: 1704

Architecture
- Functional status: Parish Church
- Architect: Kilián Ignác Dientzenhofer
- Architectural type: Basilica
- Style: Baroque
- Completed: 1737

Specifications
- Height: 49 m (161 ft)

Administration
- Archdiocese: Prague Hussite Diocese
- Parish: Old Town, Prague

The Church of Saint Nicholas (Czech: Kostel svatého Mikuláše) is a Late-Gothic and Baroque church in the Old Town of Prague. It was built between 1732-1737 on the site of a Gothic church from the 13th century which was also dedicated to Saint Nicholas.

The church was formerly used by the Czech and Slovak Orthodox Church. Since 1920 it has been the main church of the Czechoslovak Hussite Church and its Prague diocese.

During the Prague uprising in 1945, the church was used by the Czech partisans as a concealed site for Radio Prague, as the main radio building was under attack by the Waffen-SS.

== Gallery ==
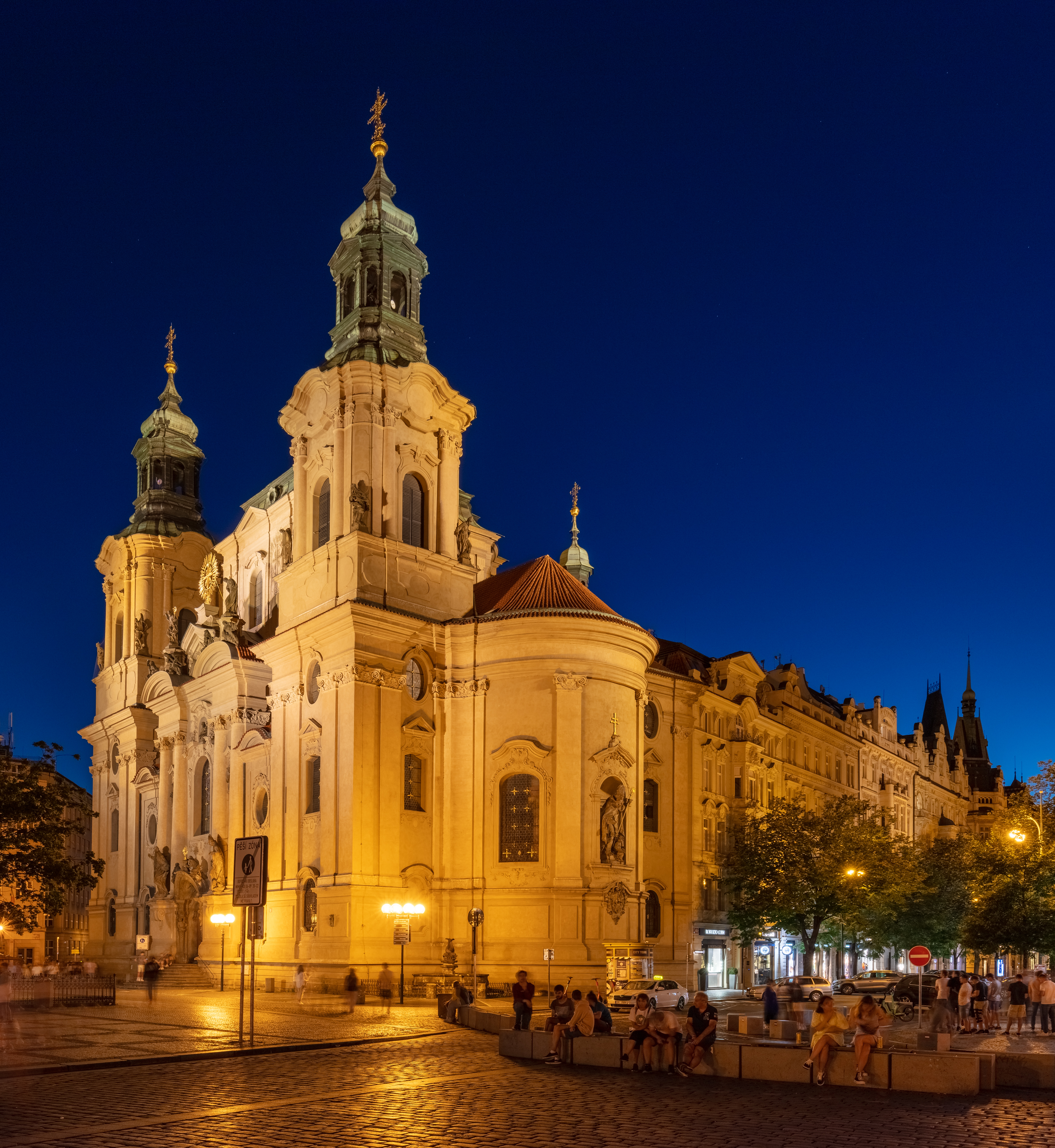
Night view

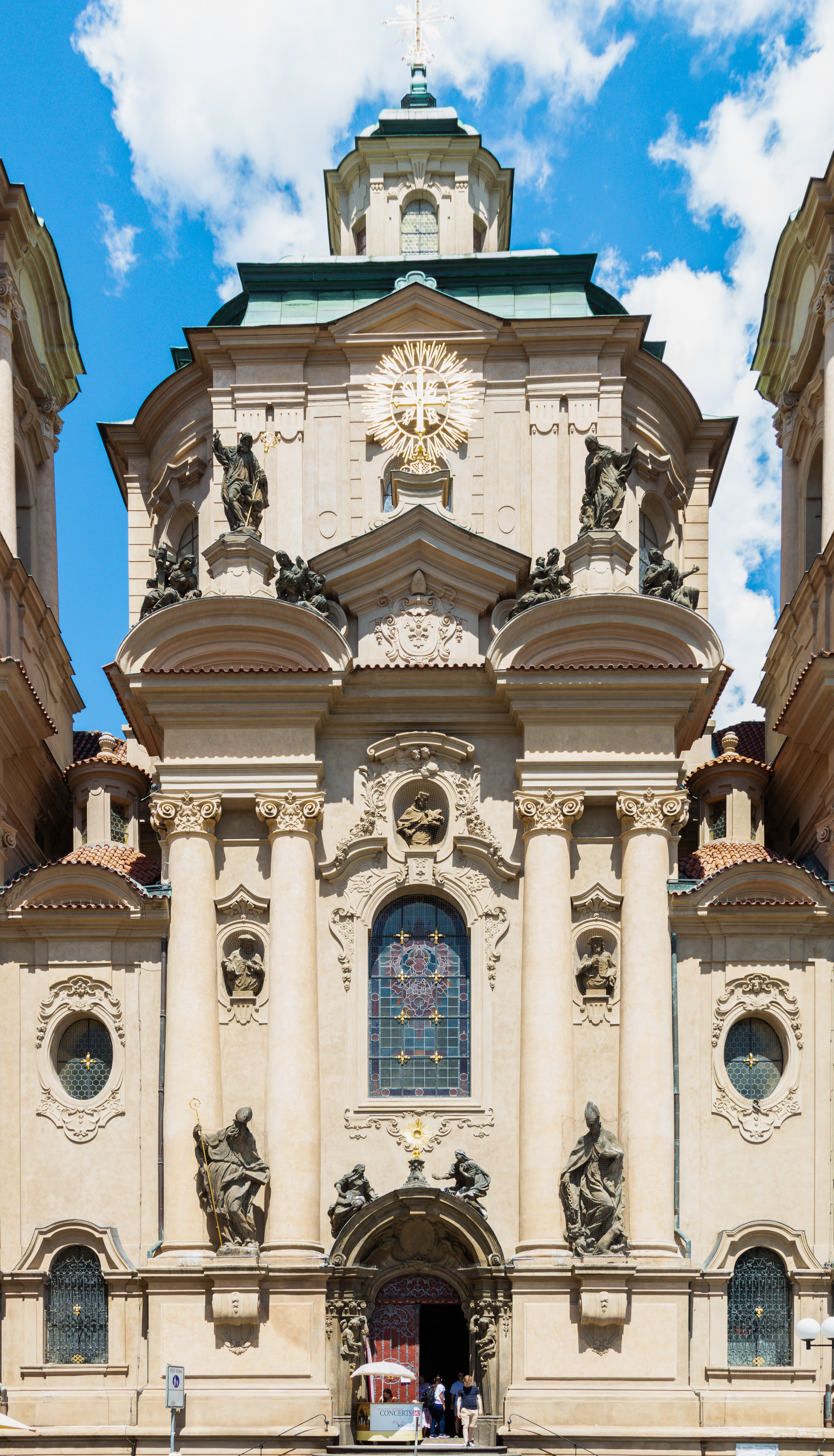
Front entrance

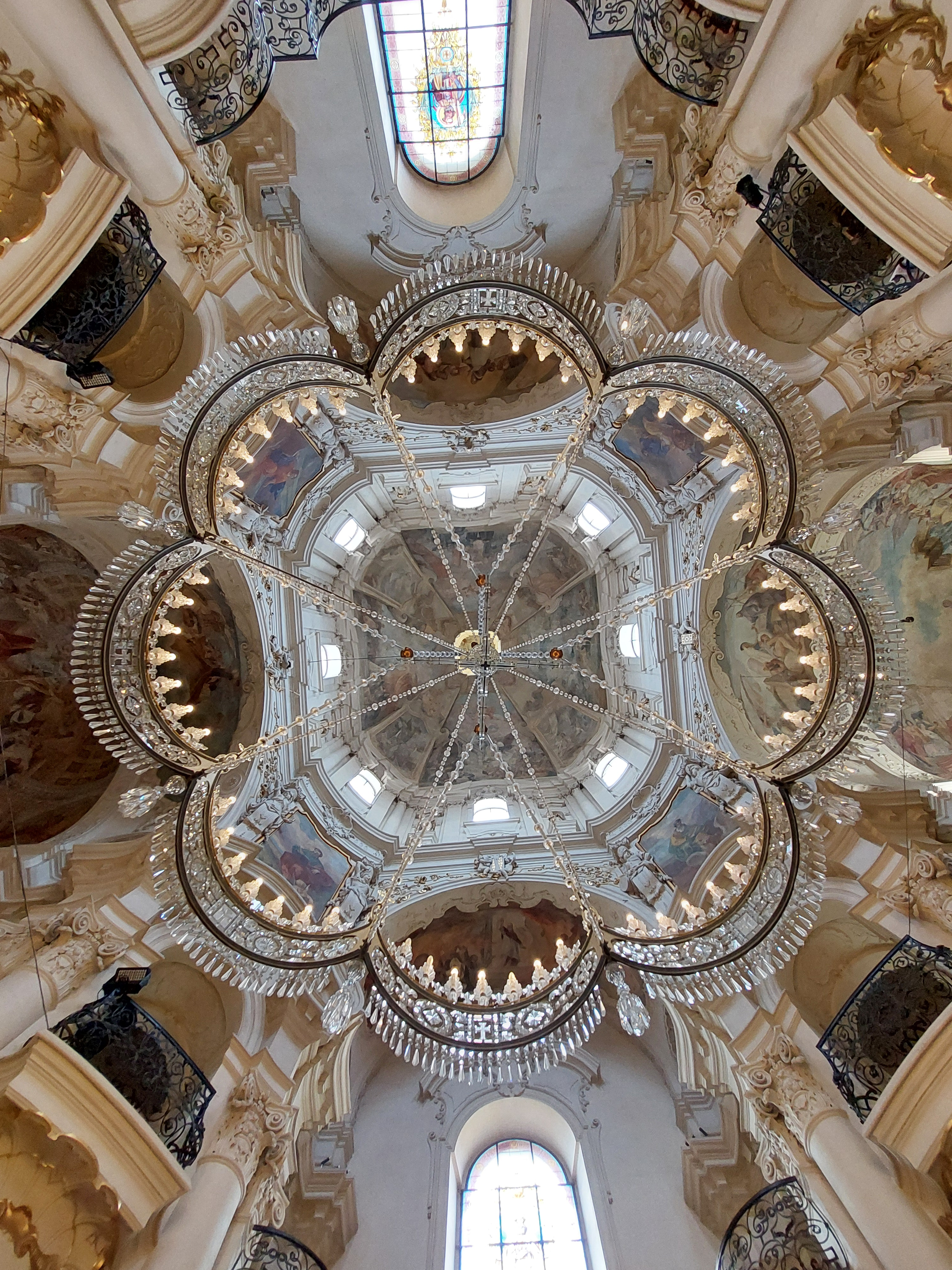
The interior of the church
