= ČRo Radiožurnál =

- Prague; Czech Republic
- Broadcast area: Czech Republic also will be radio received in: Slovakia; Poland; Austria; Germany
- Frequencies: FM: 94.6 or 90.9 MHz (Prague), various in the whole country DAB+: Block 12C (Prague), various blocks

Programming
- Language: Czech
- Format: News, Current Affairs, Talk, Rock AC

Ownership
- Owner: Český rozhlas
- Sister stations: ČRo Dvojka; ČRo Vltava

History
- First air date: May 18, 1923; 103 years ago

Links
- Website: radiozurnal.rozhlas.cz

ČRo Radiožurnál (from 1993 to 2013 Český rozhlas 1 – Radiožurnál) is a public radio station of the Czech Radio in the Czech Republic. It focuses on current news and journalism. It broadcasts the Zelená vlna ('green wave') traffic news every half hour. It was founded in 1923. Ondřej Suchan has been the station's editor-in-chief since 2016.

As of 2020, Radiožurnál is the most listened to radio station in the Czech Republic. In the first quarter of 2023, 822,000 listeners listened to it daily.

== History ==
The station Radiožurnál was established simultaneously with the establishment of the Czech Republic as the Czech continuation of the Czechoslovak station Československo, which from 31 August 1970 to 15 December 1989 was called Hvězda and before that Československo I. The station has been broadcasting live on the internet since 1998.

Since September 2014, Radiožurnál has been broadcasting a comprehensive news programme, Sixty Minutes, which runs every weekday between 9 pm and 10 pm. In 2016, a broadcast archive was created on the Radiožurnál website, where broadcasts are archived hour by hour and specific broadcasts can be traced back up to 14 days.

== Broadcasting ==
Radiožurnál's broadcasts cover the entire Czech Republic. Analogue broadcasting is provided by approximately 30 transmitters on very short waves. Digital broadcasting is provided by the terrestrial television standard DVB-T2, radio DAB+ and satellite broadcasting via the Astra 3A satellite (position 23.5° East) in DVB-S2.

Until 31 December 2021, Radiožurnál was also broadcast on longwave from the Topolná transmitter (frequency 270 kHz), which allowed listening to the station outside the Czech Republic.

=== Notable programming ===
- Zelená vlna – Czech Radio has been broadcasting traffic news under this name since the turn of the 1960s and 1970s. Since 2013, Radiožurnál has been broadcasting Green Wave every half hour 24 hours a day.
- Guest of Lucie Výborná – (daily 9:05-10:00) – non-conflicting conversation with personalities
- Dvacet minut Radiožurnálu (Monday to Friday at 17:05) – the journalistic programme has been broadcast since 2006 on weekdays and its presenters conduct a confrontational interview with a guest on a current topic.
- Zápisník zahraničních zpravodajů – created in 1955, it is one of the oldest programmes in the Czech Republic (or Czechoslovakia). Its format is a radio magazine with reports by foreign correspondents and associates of Czech Radio.
- Sportžurnál (Sunday 21:05) – Weekly summarizing the events in sport over the past weekend. Broadcast simultaneously on Radiožurnál Sport.
- O Roma Vakeren (Saturday 20:05) – magazine about Romani people.
- Stretnutie (Sunday 20:05) – the only Slovak radio magazine about Slovaks, and for Slovaks in the Czech Republic.
