= Government Army (Bohemia and Moravia) =

Army of the Protectorate of Bohemia and Moravia

- Vládní vojsko
- Active: 1939–1945
- Allegiance: Protectorate of Bohemia and Moravia
- Role: Physical security, public duties, civil defense, rearguard
- Size: 6,465 (1940)
- Principal field weapon: Mannlicher M1895 rifle

Commanders
- Commander-in-Chief: Emil Hácha
- Inspector-General: Gen. Jaroslav Eminger
- Head of 1st Inspectorate: Gen. František Fabian
- Head of 2nd Inspectorate: Gen. Karel Procházka
- Head of 3rd Inspectorate: Gen. František Horák

The Government Army (Czech: Vládní vojsko; German: Regierungstruppen) was the military force of the Protectorate of Bohemia and Moravia during the German occupation of the Czech lands.

Established on 25 July 1939, the lightly armed force of less than 7,000 men was operationally limited to internal security throughout most of its existence, with the exception of a short deployment to northern Italy in support of German forces in the spring of 1944. During the Prague Uprising, some elements of the Government Army revolted and joined in the rebellion. After World War II, the inspector-general of the Government Army, Jaroslav Eminger, was tried and acquitted on charges of collaboration with Germany.

== History ==
=== Organization ===
The Government Army was created following the dissolution of the Czechoslovak Army which occurred after the German occupation of the Czech lands, and was officially constituted on 25 July 1939 by Government Order No. 216. The German decision to permit the organization of a military force under direct control of the Protectorate of Bohemia and Moravia was due to three factors. First, the complete dissolution of the Czechoslovak Army carried with it a concurrently large increase in the unemployment rate; continued maintenance of at least a fractional military force could mitigate that to some extent. Second, Germany was anxious to legitimize its occupation by demonstrating a certain tolerance for the continuation of Czech institutions. Third, there was an obvious need for some form of personal guard for the protectorate's State President, Emil Hácha.

The Government Army had an authorized strength of 7,000 men and a period of enlistment of twelve years; at its height it had an actual strength of 6,500 troops organized in twelve battalions. Despite the force's diminutive size, it boasted 40 generals.

Government Army regional inspectorate headquarters

Emil Hácha, the State President, was commander-in-chief of the Government Army, with operational command vested in an inspector-general who, throughout the period of the army's existence, was Jaroslav Eminger. The army was organized into three regional inspectorates with their headquarters at Prague, Brno, and Hradec Králové.

The Government Army's 1st Battalion was tasked with the protection of the State President, as well as public duties at the presidential residence of Lány Castle. Beginning in November 1939, it assumed responsibility for guarding Prague Castle in concert with German forces, a mission formerly performed by the Prague Castle Guard of the defunct Czechoslovak Army.

Initially, the bulk of the Government Army consisted of officers and men transferred directly from the former Czechoslovak Army. For political reasons, many of the army's original personnel were gradually dismissed to be replaced by new recruits unconnected with the armed forces of the formerly independent Czechoslovakia. New recruits were limited to Czech males between 18 and 24 years of age, of Aryan ethnicity, at least 165 centimeters (5 ft 5 in) tall, in good health, and free of criminal record. The army's last annual recruitment occurred in 1943.

In May 1945, with the collapse of the protectorate, de facto control of the Government Army passed to the returned Czechoslovak government which deactivated the force after first transferring some of its soldiers to the reconstituted Czechoslovak Army.

=== Operations ===
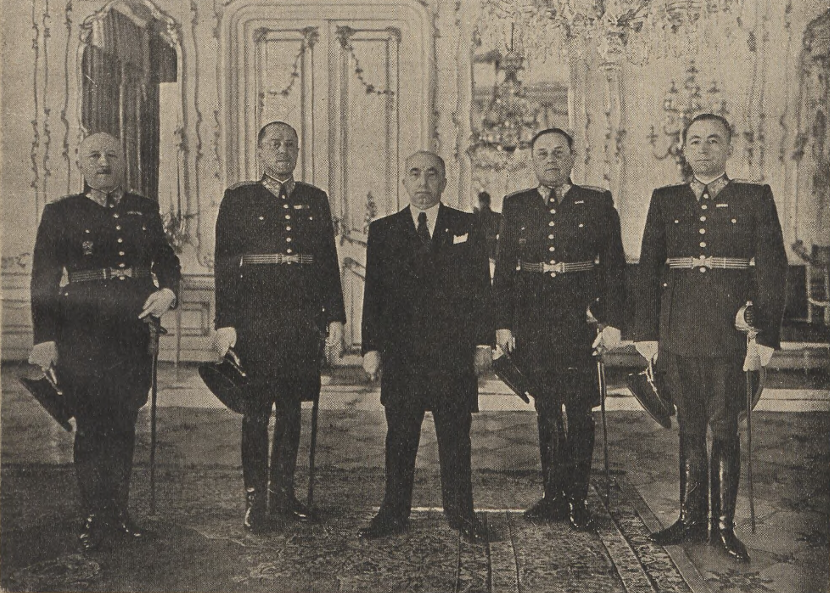
Officers of the Government Army pictured with Emil Hacha (center) in 1940.

Prior to 1944, Government Army forces were primarily deployed to provide security along railroad lines, to support civil defense, for public duties assignments, and – during the winter of 1943 to 1944 – in a short-lived effort to capture parachutist drop sites in Bohemia and Moravia used by Czech resistance fighters. According to one account, when asked by a subordinate officer what Protectorate soldiers should do in the event they successfully intercepted parachutists, General Jaroslav Eminger replied, "if there are few you will ignore them, if there are many you will join them".

In 1943, Minister of Education Emanuel Moravec advanced a proposal to deploy the army to the Eastern Front in support of German operations. State President Hácha discussed the proposal with SS-Obergruppenführer Karl Hermann Frank, who ultimately decided not to forward it to Adolf Hitler.

The Government Army's only foreign deployment came in May 1944 when the entire army – with the exception of the 1st Battalion – was moved to northern Italy to support German military operations there. Responsibilities in Italy were limited to a passive role in the construction of fortifications and field positions. While in Italy, approximately 600 of the Czech soldiers deserted to the side of the Italian partisans, due in part to the effects of the propaganda campaign "Operation Sauerkraut" of the United States' Office of Strategic Services.

On 5 May 1945 the 1st Battalion of the Government Army revolted and joined Czech partisans in the Battle for Czech Radio. Three days later, a separate force of the army moved to the Old Town Hall to assist in its defense from German attack.

== Uniforms and equipment ==
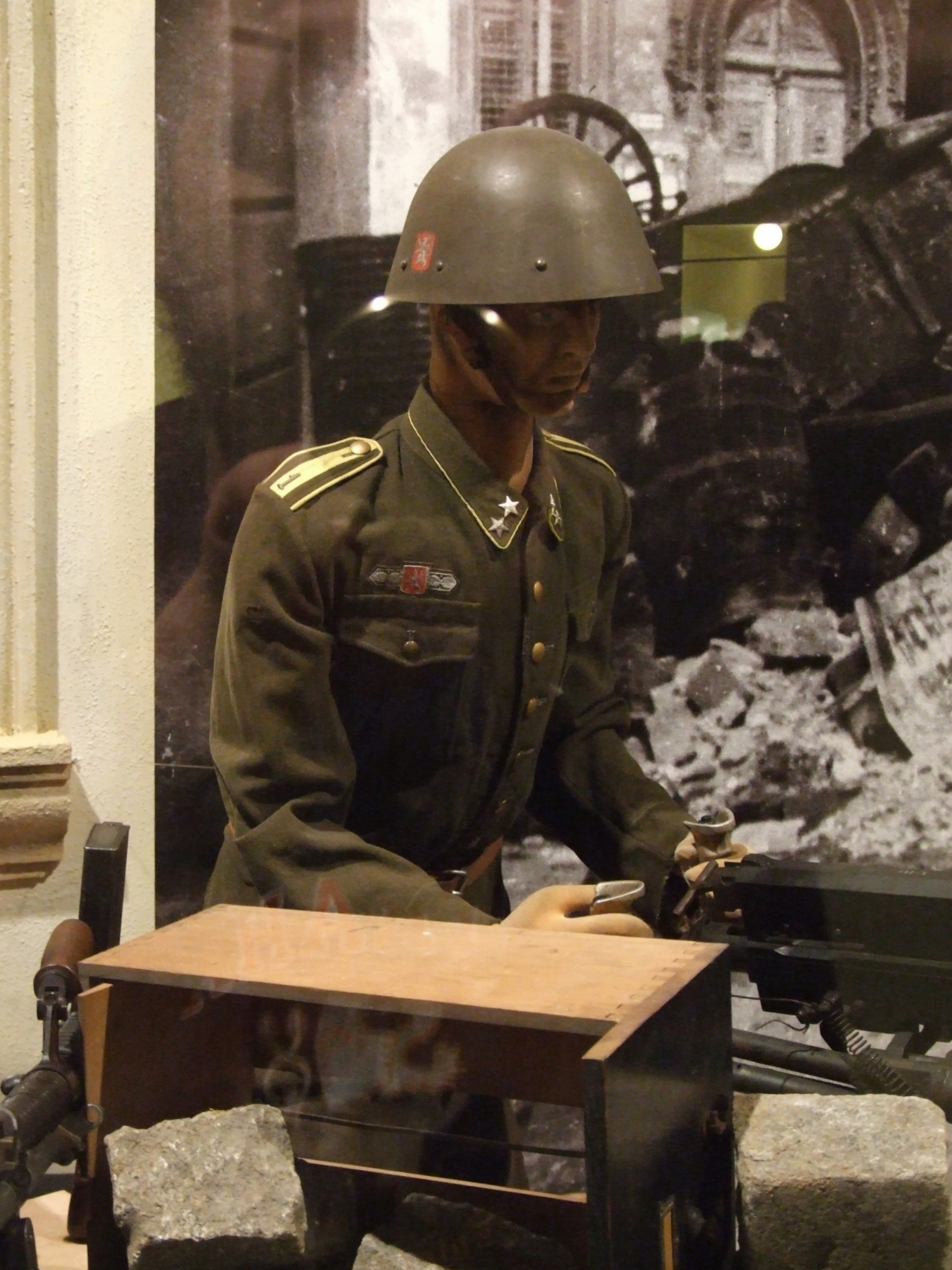
Uniform of a corporal of the Government Army

The Government Army was only equipped with light arms in the form of vz. 24 pistols, M1898 revolvers, Mannlicher M1895 rifles, and bayonets. A plan to raise a cavalry troop was shelved due to a lack of horses. Its uniforms were based on those of the defunct Czechoslovak Army, using rank insignia from the former Austrian Army.

The Government Army's only decoration was an Achievement Badge created in 1944 and awarded in three classes for "repeated assistance to the German forces".

== Rank insignia ==
=== Commissioned officer ranks ===
The rank insignia of commissioned officers.

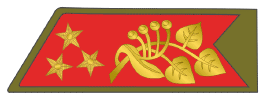
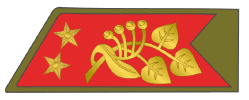
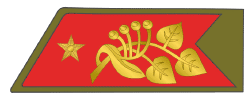
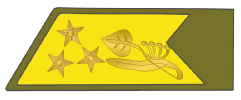
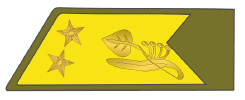
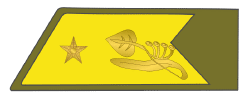
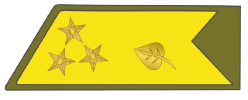
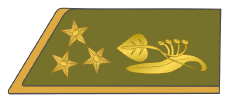
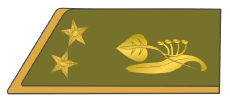
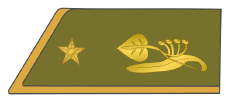
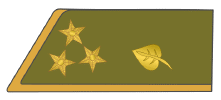
Rank group	General / flag officers			Senior officers			Junior officers
1939–1940
1939–1940							Štábní kapitán	Kapitán
1940–1945
1940–1945	Generál I. třídy	Generál II. třídy	Generál III. třídy	Plukovník	Podplukovník	Major	Hejtman I. třídy	Hejtman	Nadporučík	Poručík
German Army equivalent	General der Waffengattung	Generalleutnant	Generalmajor	Oberst	Oberstleutnant	Major	Hauptmann		Oberleutnant	Leutnant

=== Other ranks ===
The rank insignia of non-commissioned officers and enlisted personnel.

Rank group	Senior NCOs			Junior NCOs				Enlisted
1939–1940
1939–1940	Praporčík	Štábní rotmistr	Rotmistr					Vojín
1940–1945
1940–1945	Štábní strážmistr	Vrchní strážmistr	Strážmistr	Rotný	Četař	Desátník	Svobodník	Střelec
German Army equivalent	Stabsfeldwebel	Oberfeldwebel	Feldwebel	Unterfeldwebel	Unteroffizier	Obergefreiter	Gefreiter	Soldat

== Legacy ==
Whether or not the Government Army can be considered a collaborationist force, or merely the submissive military of a defeated state, has been debated. Its commanding officer, Jaroslav Eminger, was tried and acquitted on charges of collaboration following World War II, some members of the force engaged in active resistance operations simultaneous with their service in the army, and – in the waning days of the conflict – elements of the army joined in the Prague Uprising.

=== Notable soldiers ===
- Karel Effa
- Jaroslav Záruba

== Related forces ==
In March 1945 Germany authorized the creation of the St. Wenceslas Company (Czech: Svatováclavská rota), a foreign legion of Czech volunteers to serve with the Waffen-SS. Recruitment fell below German objectives and the unit never saw combat.

== See also ==
- Army of the Czech Republic
- Hlinka Guard
- Armistice Army (Vichy France)
- Security Battalions (Greece)
