= Jaroslav Eminger =

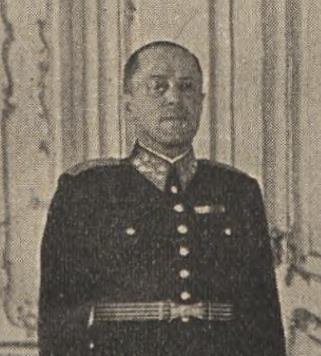
- Eminger pictured in 1940
- Born: 4 June 1886; Čáslav, Austria-Hungary
- Died: 14 July 1964 (aged 78); Prague, Czechoslovakia
- Military career
- Allegiance: Austria-Hungary (before 1919); Czechoslovakia (1919–1939); Protectorate of Bohemia and Moravia (1939–1945)
- Rank: General (1st Class)
- Commands: Government Army

Jaroslav Eminger (4 June 1886 – 14 July 1964) was a Czech military officer who commanded the Government Army during the period of the Protectorate of Bohemia and Moravia.

Eminger served in the Austrian Army during World War I and, post-war, advanced through the ranks as a cavalry officer in the army of the independent Czechoslovakia. He reluctantly accepted command of the Government Army in 1939, using his post to try to limit the extent of its cooperation with the occupation authorities. In 1945, he deployed the Government Army to reinforce Czech partisans against the Waffen SS during the Battle for Czech Radio and later dispatched additional troops to aid in the capture of Prague Castle.

After the defeat of Germany in World War II, Eminger was arrested and charged with collaboration with the occupation authorities. He was acquitted of all charges by the special National Court and restored to his military rank.

== Early life and education ==
Jaroslav Eminger was born in Čáslav to a military family. He was educated at the Theresian Military Academy.

== Career ==
=== Early career ===
Eminger served in the Austro-Hungarian Army on the Russian and Italian fronts in World War I. Between 1919 and 1922 he led the new Czechoslovak military mission in Budapest, coordinating its intelligence-gathering activities. Returning to Czechoslovakia, he advanced through the ranks as a cavalry officer, serving as commander of the equestrian school in Pardubice and ultimately being promoted to commanding officer of the 3rd Fast Division.

=== Command of the Government Army ===
Eminger left the country following the German occupation of the Czech lands in 1939 but was persuaded by Alois Eliáš to return to help lead the creation of the new Government Army, of which he became the first commander in August. As inspector-general of the Government Army, Eminger was made General 2nd Class on 11 November 1939 and promoted to General 1st Class on 1 August 1942.

During his time leading the Government Army, Eminger pursued a program of outward cooperation with the German authorities while quietly working to ensure the army's operational incompetence and turning a blind eye to resistance activities on the part of soldiers. In 1943 the Government Army was deployed in an attempt to capture parachutist drop sites in Bohemia and Moravia used by resistance fighters and the Allies. According to one account, when asked by a subordinate officer what Protectorate soldiers should do in the event they successfully intercepted parachutists, Eminger replied, "if there are few you will ignore them, if there are many you will join them".

In the spring of 1944, Ferdinand Schaal requested Emil Hácha order the deployment of the Government Army to Italy to assist German military operations there, a deployment Eminger protested in vain. One of Eminger's final acts as commander of the Government Army came on 5 May 1945, when he ordered the army's 1st Battalion to turn their weapons against the German forces in the Battle for Czech Radio, with additional forces later moving to aid in the capture of Prague Castle.

=== Arrest and exoneration ===
Eminger was arrested after the end of World War II and, in April 1947, went on trial on charges of collaboration with Germany. His case was heard by the special National Court organized to try the 80 alleged "leading traitors".

Several witnesses spoke in Eminger's defense against the charges of collaboration, and a written character reference signed by dozens more was submitted to the court. He was one of 15 persons acquitted by the special National Court, with the tribunal recording in the verdict that the allegations against him were "groundless" and that Eminger was "a loyal Czech and a brave man". In 1949 his military rank was restored and he was placed on the reserve roster of the Czechoslovak Army.

== Personal life ==
Following his exoneration, Eminger lived the rest of his life in secluded retirement in Jevany. After death, he was interred in the family tomb at Olšany Cemetery.

== See also ==
- Josef Ježek
