= Topolná =

- Municipality
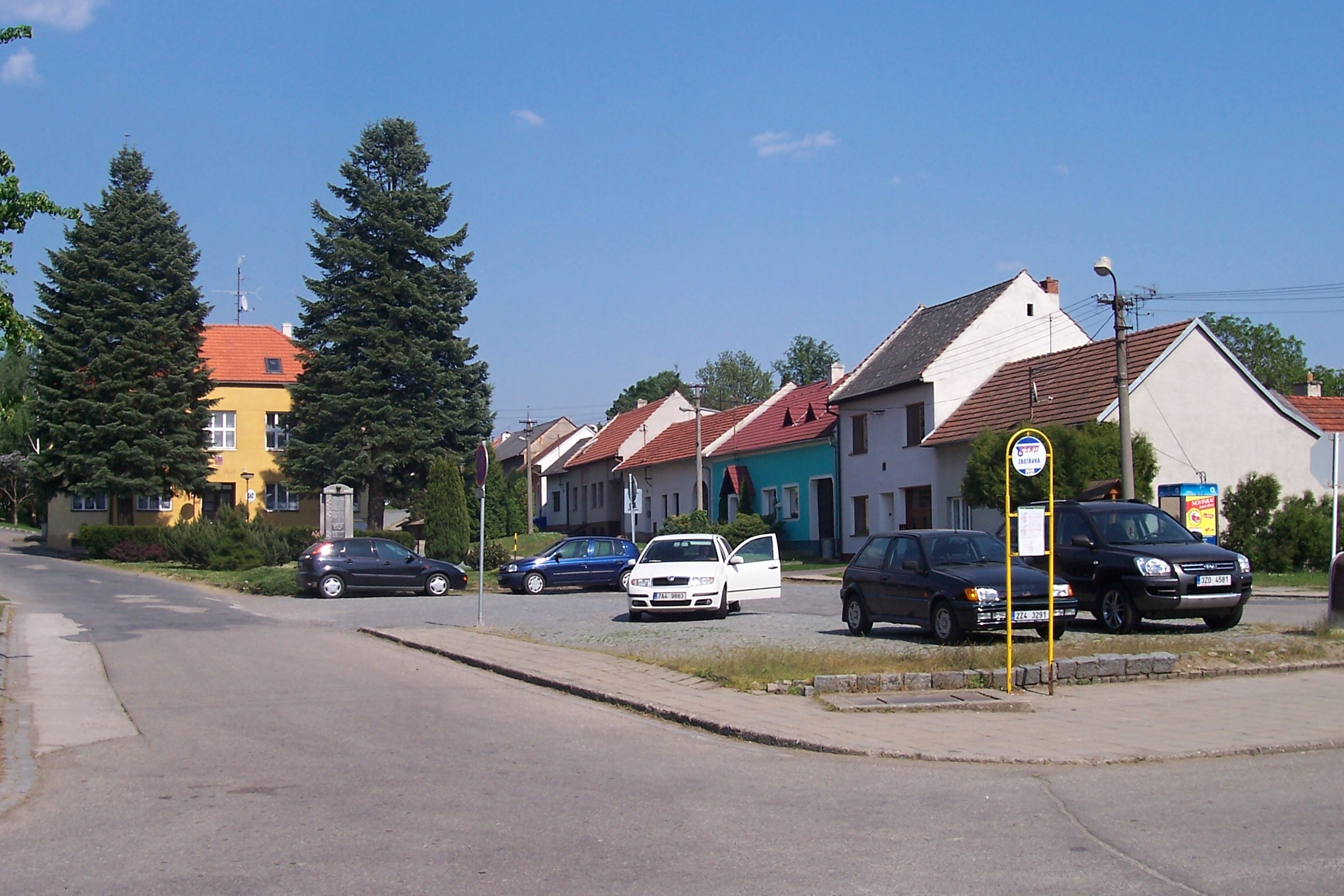
- Centre of Topolná

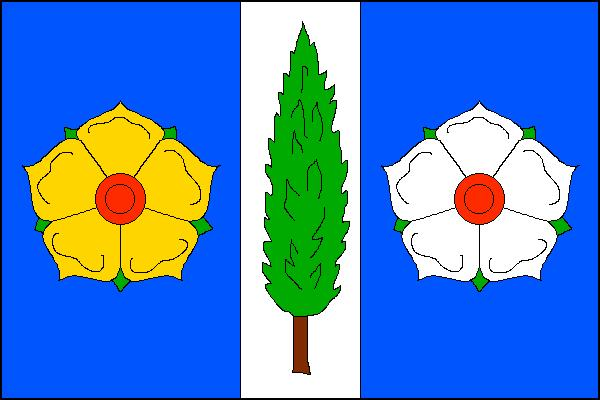
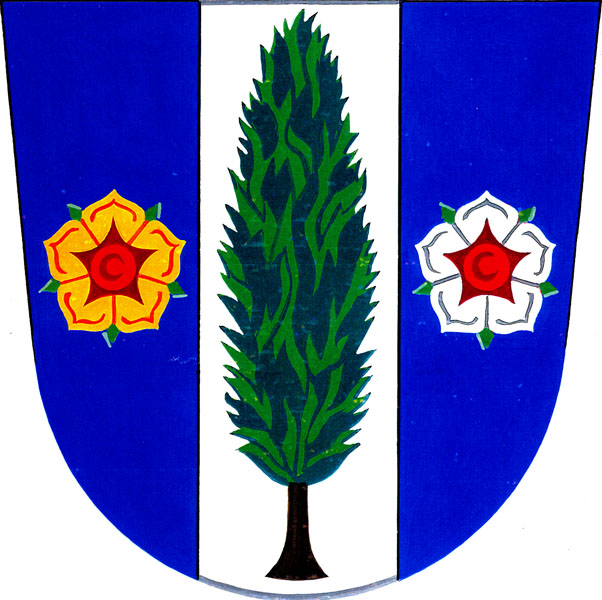
- Flag Coat of arms

- Location in the Czech Republic
- Coordinates: 49°7′19″N 17°32′40″E
- Country: Czech Republic
- Region: Zlín
- District: Uherské Hradiště
- First mentioned: 1318

Area
  - Total: 10.39 km^{2} (4.01 sq mi)
- Elevation: 192 m (630 ft)

Population (2026-01-01)
  - Total: 1,585
  - Density: 152.6/km^{2} (395.1/sq mi)
- Time zone: UTC+1 (CET)
  - Summer (DST): UTC+2 (CEST)
- Postal code: 687 11
- Website: www.topolna.cz

Topolná is a municipality and village in Uherské Hradiště District in the Zlín Region of the Czech Republic. It has about 1,600 inhabitants.

Topolná lies approximately 10 kilometres (6 mi) north-east of Uherské Hradiště, 15 km (9 mi) south-west of Zlín, and 250 km (160 mi) south-east of Prague.

The central longwave broadcasting facility of the Czech Republic, the Topolná transmitter, was located in Topolná. The transmitter was turned off on 1 January 2022, and was demolished on 28 July 2022.

== Demographics ==
Historical population
Year	Pop.	±%
1869	1,130	—
1880	1,250	+10.6%
1890	1,287	+3.0%
1900	1,396	+8.5%
1910	1,554	+11.3%
1921	1,556	+0.1%
1930	1,496	−3.9%
1950	1,643	+9.8%
1961	1,733	+5.5%
1970	1,654	−4.6%
1980	1,590	−3.9%
1991	1,501	−5.6%
2001	1,541	+2.7%
2011	1,562	+1.4%
2021	1,530	−2.0%
Source: Censuses
