= ČRo Rádio Praha =

- Prague; Czech Republic
- Broadcast area: Prague
- Frequencies: FM: 107.1 MHz (Prague); DAB+: Block 12C (Prague), various blocks

Programming
- Language: Czech

Ownership
- Owner: Český rozhlas

History
- First air date: 31 August 1964; 61 years ago

Links
- Website: praha.rozhlas.cz

ČRo Rádio Praha (in 1992-2015 Český rozhlas Regina, 2015-2019 Český rozhlas Regina DAB Praha, 2019-2023 Český rozhlas Rádio DAB Praha) is a regional radio station of the Czech Radio based in Prague, Czech Republic. It was founded in 1964 and is based in the National House in Karlín.

== History ==
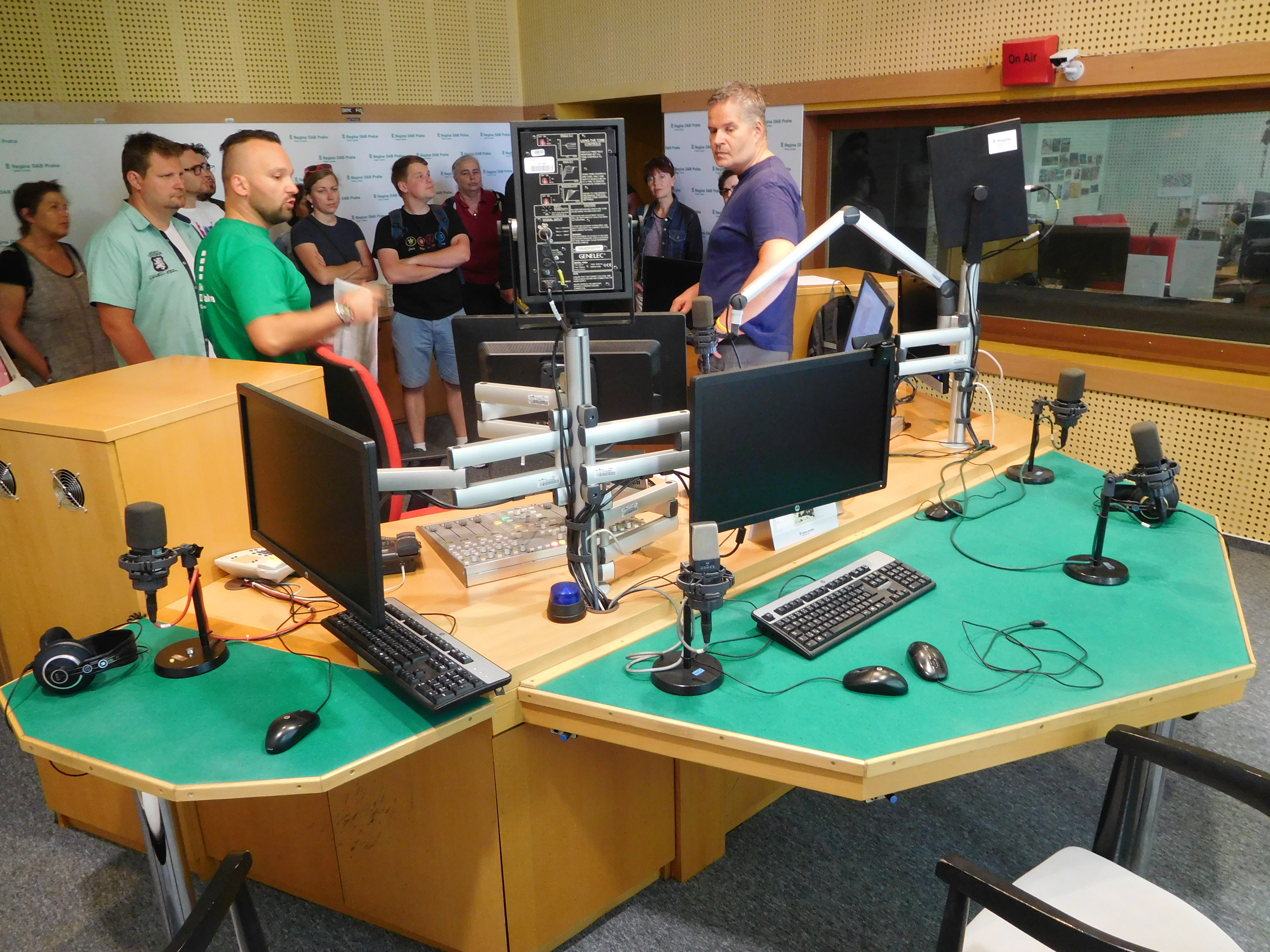
Studio Regina DAB Prague at the National House (2018)

Regional broadcasting for Prague was launched by Czechoslovak Radio on 31 August 1964. On 2 January 1991, the Prague and Central Bohemia studios merged under the name Regina. In 2001, Regina launched a separate broadcast for the Central Bohemian Region, which became completely independent on 21 October 2002 under the name ČRo Region.

On 2 November 2015, the Regina station was renamed Regina DAB Praha and left the analogue VHF band. The programme changed significantly - the demanding programmes disappeared from the airwaves and the distinctive feature became music and live moderated inputs with service information (news, weather, transport, culture). Another name change took place on 1 October 2019, when the station changed its name to Český rozhlas Rádio DAB Praha.

Since 2 January 2023, the station has been called simply Radio Praha. According to Czech Radio, the new name was intended to attract new listeners in the target group of 25-40 years old, for whom the name Regina was unattractive. The change was also accompanied by a change in the station's sound graphics and the names of some programmes.

== Programming ==
The station broadcasts a daily stream of music and information from 6:00am to 7:00pm. On weekends, the magazines S vámi v Praze (Saturday 12:00) and Up to the marrow (Sunday 12:00) are included. Radio Prague broadcasts news all day twice an hour and traffic information every 15 minutes.

== Broadcasting ==
Radio Prague broadcasts in Prague in analogue on very short waves, digital broadcasting is also available in the multiplex ČRo DAB+, in DVB-S2 and on the Internet. Since January 2023, the station is broadcast in FM broadcasting for the territory of Prague on the frequency 107.1 FM.
