= Battle for Czech Radio =

1945 battle in Prague at the end of WWII

- Part of the Prague uprising
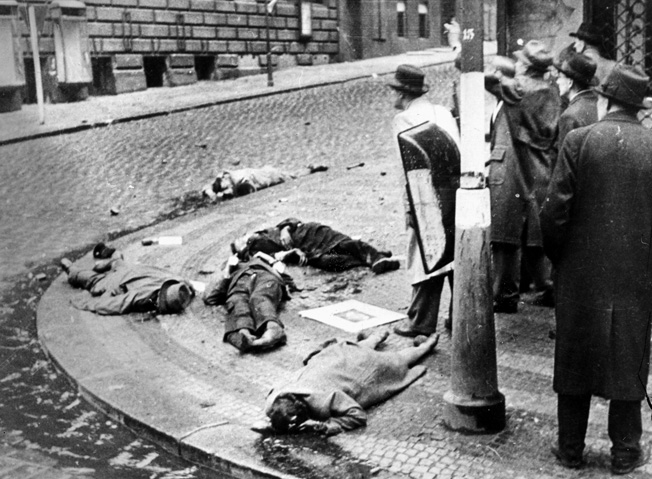
- ČROZH
Date	5–9 May 1945
Location	Czech Radio headquarters, Prague 50°04′43″N 14°26′04″E
Result	Czech victory

Belligerents
Germany	Czech resistance (Protectorate of Bohemia and Moravia) Government Army (1st Battalion)

Commanders and leaders
Karl Hermann Frank	Jaroslav Záruba †; Václav Kopecký

Strength
213 soldiers; 1 armoured train; Me 262 jet fighters; Fw 190 fighter-bombers	± 1,104

Casualties and losses
Unknown killed; 123 captured	79–89 killed
- 140 civilians killed

An illicit broadcast from the radio studio in Prague helped spark the Prague uprising during the final days of World War II, but German counterattacks led to a pitched battle breaking out. The conflict became known as the Battle for Czech Radio (Czech: Boj o Český rozhlas). By controlling the radio, the Czech resistance was able to inform and inspire the people of Prague to effective action during the Prague uprising. German forces were unable to prevent the Czechs from broadcasting. However, the attempts to appeal to Russians and Americans for aid were unsuccessful.

== Background ==
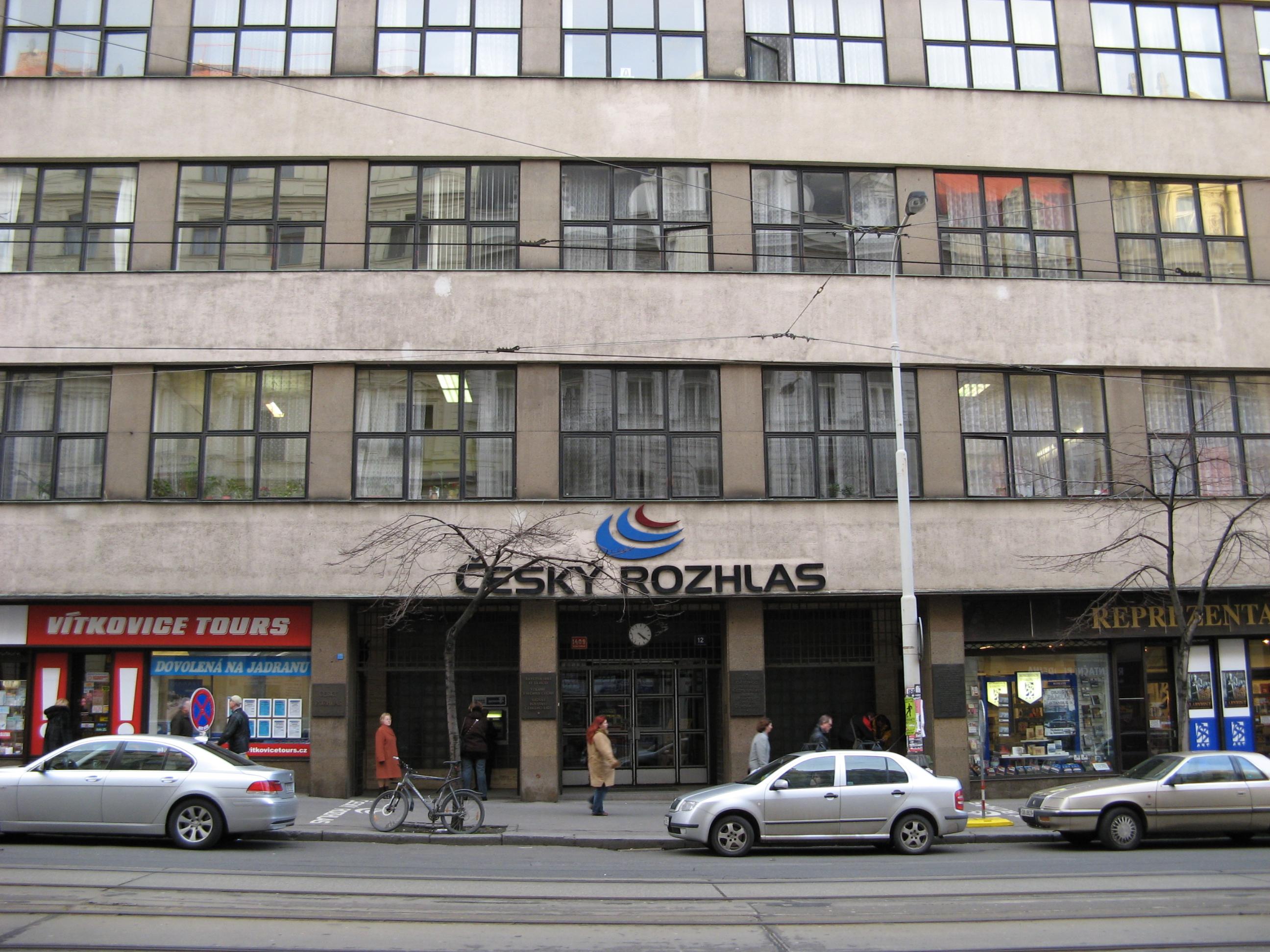
Entrance to the Český Rozhlas (Czech Radio) headquarters in Prague

Fourteen members of the prewar staff of Czech Radio had been imprisoned or executed by the Nazis, some for political reasons and others because they were Jewish. During the six-year occupation, the Nazi regime used the radio to distribute propaganda, decreed that all broadcasts be made in German, and banned music by Czech composers. Although the BBC, the government-in-exile in London, and Czech communists in Moscow made broadcasts in Czech, listening to foreign radio was punishable by death. In 1943, the Germans removed shortwave capability from 1 million radios, preventing Czechs from listening to foreign broadcasts.

From 30 April – 1 May 1945, the Waffen-SS Senior Group Leader (Obergruppenführer) and General of Police Karl Hermann Frank announced over the radio in Prague that he would drown any uprising in a "sea of blood". As rumors of an impending Allied approach reached Prague, the people of Prague streamed into the streets to welcome the victors. Frank ordered the streets to be cleared and instructed the German army and police forces in Prague to fire at anyone who disobeyed.

The radio staff began to plan for the takeover of the radio in 1944. The Nazis were aware that control of the airwaves might prove decisive in the event of an uprising, and increased security at the beginning of May. About 90 SS guards were posted inside the building at Vinohradská 12 in downtown Prague, and a barbed-wire fence was erected outside the entrance, with two machine guns controlling entry and exit. The radio staff retaliated by removing all signage inside the building, so that the SS guards would get lost, and hiding out in the radio studio over the night of May 4–5.

During the uprising, the radio was led by Professor Otakar Matoušek, a former director of scientific programmes at the radio before the war.

== Battle ==
=== 5 May ===
On 5 May, the uprising was triggered in the morning by a broadcast on Czech radio. In a mixture of Czech and German, Czech Radio announcer Zdeněk Mančal said: "It is just six o' clock". The radio defied Nazi censorship by broadcasting in Czech, announcing that the Nazis had lost the war, and playing banned Czech music. The SS guards tried to interrupt the broadcast, but were unable to find the newsroom due to the lack of signage.

Just after noon, elements of the 1st Battalion of the Government Army, a lightly armed police force, arrived. Unaware that there were about 90 members of the Waffen-SS guarding the building, the policemen helped members of the radio staff enter the building over the rooftops and through a side entrance. Gunfire could be heard over the radio, still in the control of Czech employees who had barricaded themselves in the newsroom. The Nazi flag was torn down and American and Czechoslovak flags raised over the building.

At 12:33 on May 5, 1945, the radio announcer broadcast a call to Czech policemen and ordinary citizens to come to the aid of the beleaguered building, issuing the famous message: "Calling all Czechs! Come to our help at once. Calling all Czechs." This message marked the beginning of the Prague uprising.

At this time, the lowest three stories of the building were still held by the SS, but the Balbínova street entrance was held by the resistance. Fierce fighting inside the building and in the nearby streets continued for the rest of the afternoon. The SS men, heavily armed with machine guns and grenades, were confused by the lack of signage in the building and unaware that Czech policemen had taken control of the upper stories. They moved from room to room, securing the building, and encountered resistance on the second floor. With considerable loss of life due to their inferior weaponry—the Czech policemen were armed mainly with pistols—the resistance fighters were eventually able to drive them into the basement and the courtyard. The fire brigade flooded the basement, forcing the SS men to surrender at 17:30.

At 19:22, a radio broadcast urged Praguers to build barricades to prevent the Germans from moving troops and armour into the city. Over 1,600 had been constructed by morning.

=== 6 May ===
The battle for Vinohradská 12 continued until the Red Army arrived in Prague on 9 May. On 6 May, the SS sent armored cars carrying troops in an attempt to swarm the building, but they were overrun by the Czechs, who seized the vehicles and the weapons. The Germans then called in an air strike. The weather was good, and the Czech resistance had no antiaircraft defenses. A Me 262 jet fighter bombed the building, causing sufficient damage as to prevent the Czechs from using the building to broadcast for the rest of the uprising.

The Czechs resumed broadcasting 80 minutes later from a transmitter in Strašnice, before moving to St. Nicholas Church on 7 May. The Czechs had smuggled equipment and laid telephone lines from the military headquarters at the City Hall to the nearby church, from whose tower they continued to broadcast. However, the Germans continued to attack Vinohradská 12, believing that the Czechs were still using the building to broadcast.

=== 7–8 May ===
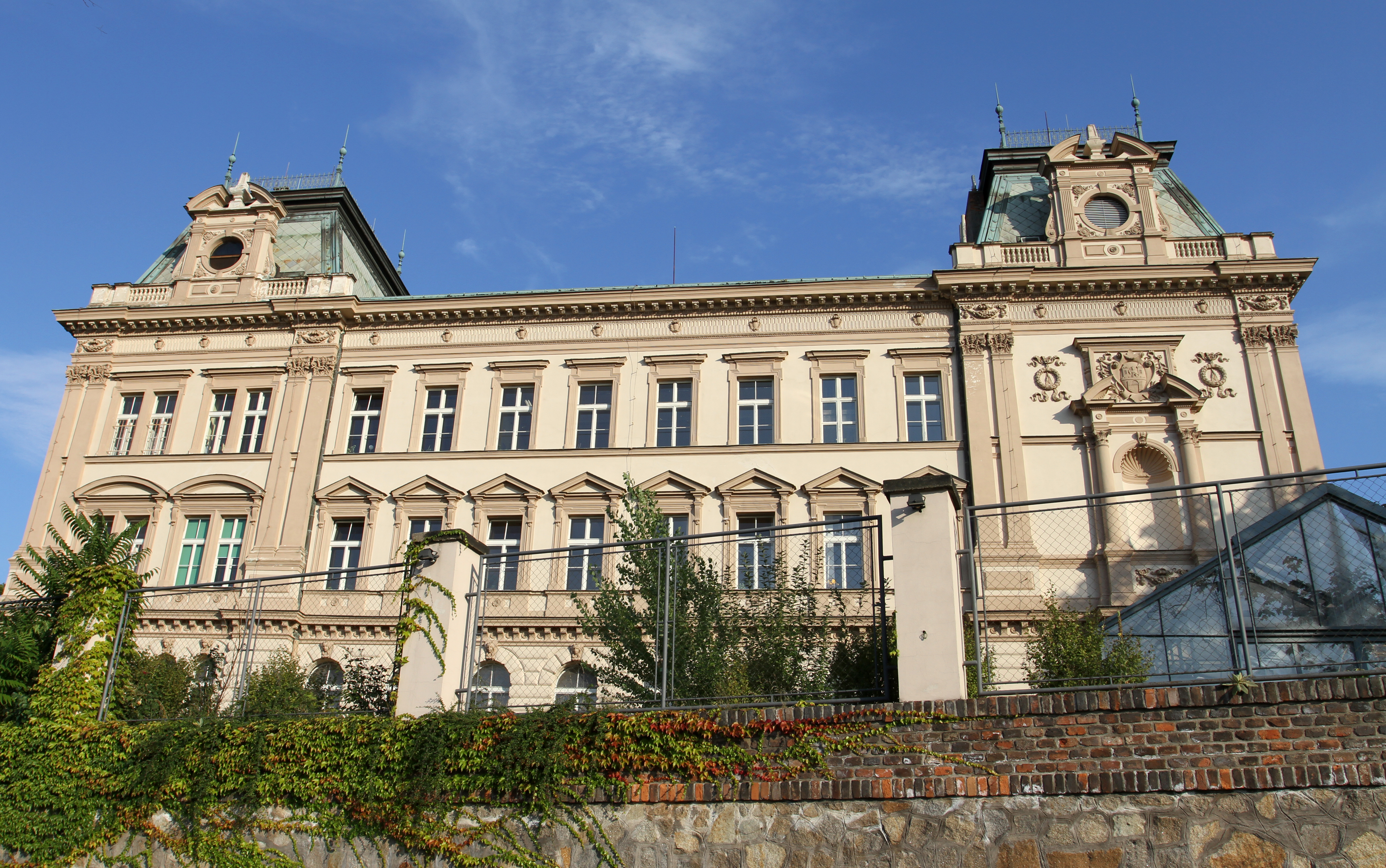
Na Smetance school

About 123 Waffen-SS, barricaded in a nearby school at Na Smetance, were able to shoot resistance fighters coming in and out of the radio building and inflicted many casualties. The Czechs did not have enough firepower to overpower them, so on 7 May two British escaped prisoners of war, Sergeant Thomas Vokes and Private William Greig, offered to pose as British paratroopers and solicit the surrender of the garrison.

Vokes and Greig, accompanied by Czech commander Jaroslav Záruba and Václav Kopecký and another Czech carrying a white flag, claimed that they represented a regiment of British paratroopers and the Axis position would be eliminated by an Allied airstrike. The Germans signed the surrender at 11:40, handed over a lorry filled with Panzerfausts, small arms, and ammunition, and vacated the area. The resistance was at the time short of weapons and running out of ammunition.

The battle intensified due to the departure of the Russian Liberation Army from Prague. The radio building was hit by more than 40 shells and Jaroslav Záruba, one of the main commanders, was killed.

=== Effects ===
Along with providing inspiration and encouragement to the Czech resistance fighting in and around Prague, broadcasts were also made in German to encourage Wehrmacht and SS soldiers to surrender. English and Russian were also used in an attempt to encourage Patton's Third Army and the Red Army to come to the aid of the city. The English-language broadcaster was William Grieg, a Scottish escaped prisoner of war. The Americans had already agreed with the Russians to halt at Pilsen, 50 miles west of Prague, and did not advance, while the Russians encountered significant resistance north of Prague. Despite entreaties, no Allied airstrikes were performed, nor were supplies air-dropped to the defenders.

The Czech Radio likely played a role in inciting war crimes against German civilians during and after the Prague uprising, by passing on anti-German messages from political leaders.

== Legacy ==
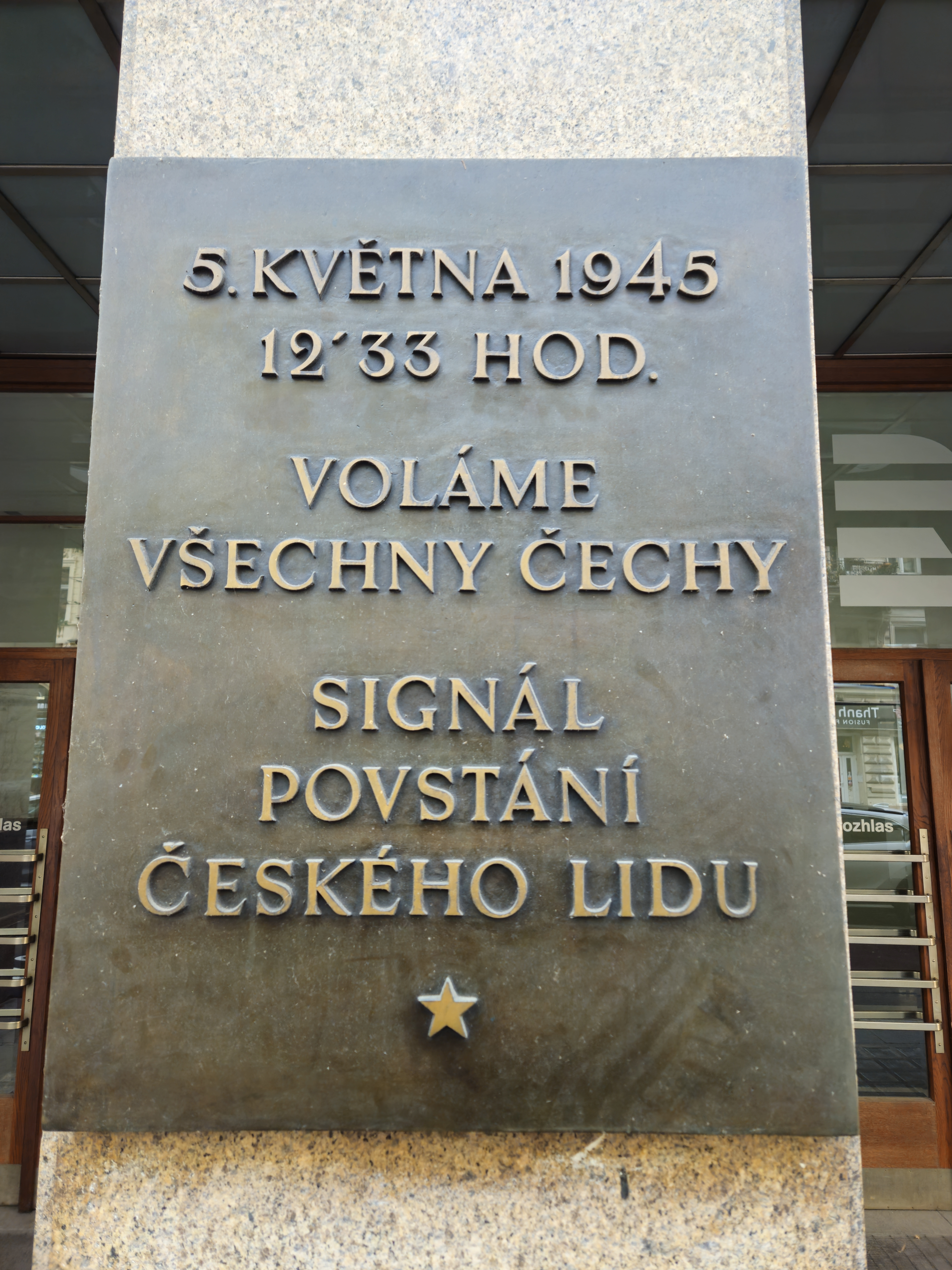
Memorial

In 1946, the Radio Fighters Association (Czech: sdružení Bojovníci rozhlasu) was established to help wounded fighters and educate the public about the event. By the beginning of 1948, 1102 people had proven that they had participated in the battle and were issued commemorative medals, although this did not include everyone who had participated. The Communist government removed 468 names for political reasons in February. Radio Prague has an ongoing effort to chronicle the names of all the participants in the battle for the radio, and write biographies of their lives. The subject has been a matter of continuing public interest, even inspiring reenactments.

Czech Radio later claimed that Prague was the only city whose free radio continued to broadcast during the entire battle for the city.

== Bibliography ==
- Frommer, B. (2005). Nation Cleansing. Cambridge: CUP. ISBN 9780521008969.
- Jay, J. (2014). Facing Fearful Odds. Barnsley: Pen & Sword. ISBN 9781473827349.
- Jones, M. (2015). After Hitler. London: John Murray. ISBN 9781848544970.
- Messenger, Jack (2008). Prague (5th ed.). London: New Holland. ISBN 9781845378561.
- Merten, U. (2017). Forgotten Voices. Abingdon: Routledge. ISBN 9781351519540.
