= ČRo Radio Wave =

- Prague; Czech Republic
- Frequencies: DAB+: Block 12C (Prague), various blocks

Programming
- Language: Czech
- Format: Urban contemporary

Ownership
- Owner: Český rozhlas

History
- First air date: 13 January 2006; 20 years ago

Links
- Website: wave.rozhlas.cz

ČRo Radio Wave (in 2006-2008 Czech Radio 4 – Radio Wave) is a digital public radio station of the Czech Radio in the Czech Republic. It primarily operates as an online platform for audio consumption, providing a wide range of podcasts and music programmes for a target audience of loosely 20-30 year olds.

== History ==
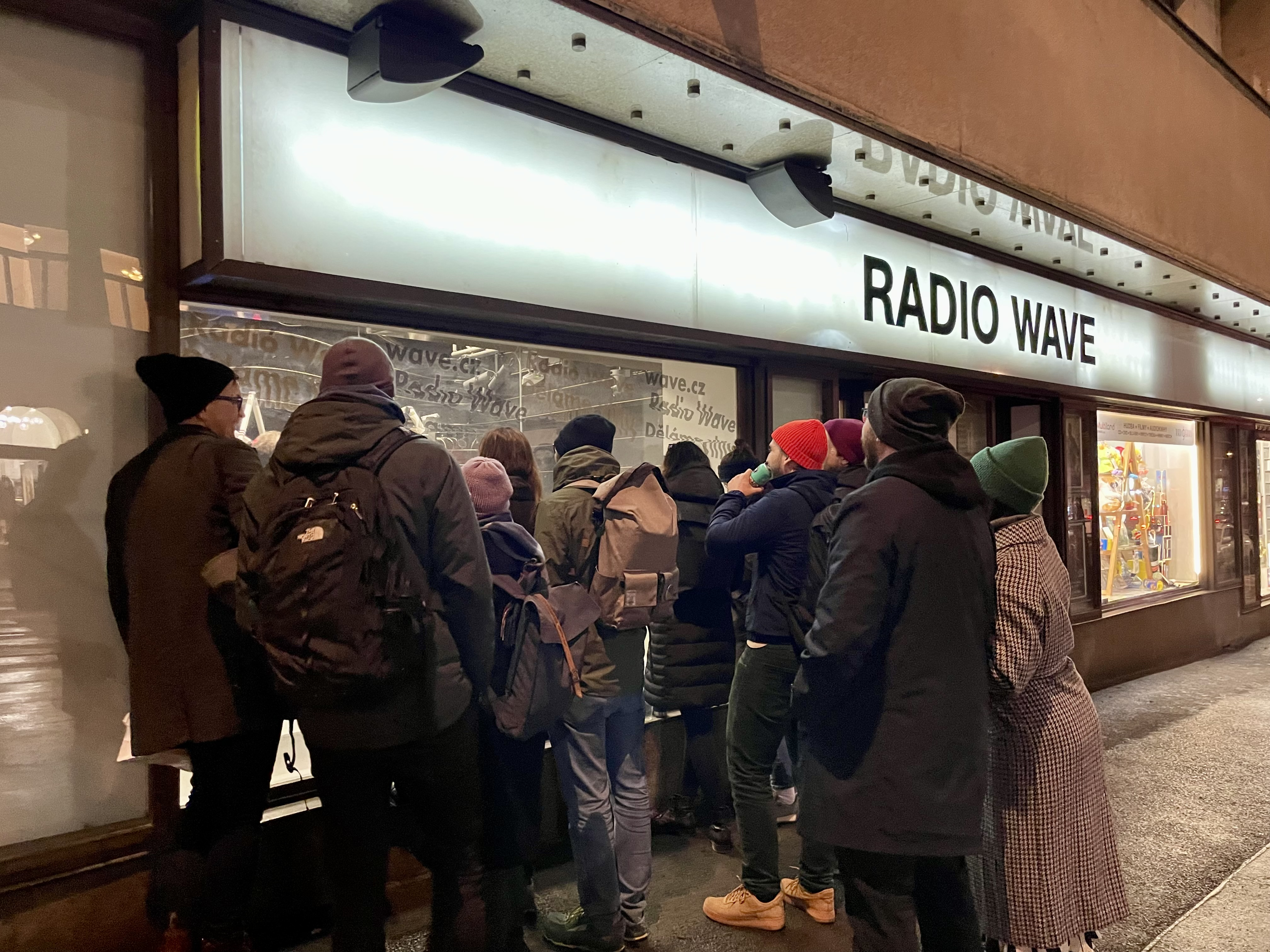
Radio Wave studio behind the window of the Czech Radio on Vinohradská třída in Prague

The station began broadcasting on 13 January 2006 under its original name Czech Radio 4 – Radio Wave, both digitally and with an analogue VHF transmitter for Prague. In 2008, Radio Wave's analogue frequency was terminated by the Czech Radio management at the insistence of the radio council.

== Programming ==
The playlist of the on-air broadcast consists mainly of electro-pop, alternative rock, rap, dance and urban music. The daytime stream is complemented by genre programmes (funk, hardcore, hip hop, dub, world music, rap, trap, etc.) whose authors are themselves active in the music scene. Public affairs programmes and podcasts cover culture, cuisine, LGBT+, entertainment, fashion, education, religion, travel, lifestyle and social events.
