= ČRo 6 =

Czech radio station

Český rozhlas 6
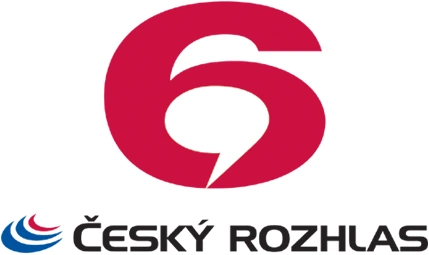
- Country: Czech Republic

Ownership
- Owner: Český rozhlas

History
- Launch date: 31 August 1936; 88 years ago
- Replaced: Radio Free Europe
- Closed: 28 February 2013; 12 years ago
- Replaced by: ČRo Plus

Český rozhlas 6 (abbreviated as ČRo 6; in 1995-2002 Český rozhlas 6/Rádio Svobodná Evropa) was the Czech Radio's full-channel analytical-publicist station that broadcast from 1995-2013. Until 2002, it was a joint project of Czech Radio and Radio Free Europe, whose Czech broadcasts it continued. The successor to ČRo 6 became Český rozhlas Plus in 2013.

The station focused on commenting on political events, developments and the life of civil society in the Czech Republic and European countries. It broadcast programmes focusing on politics, culture, economy, historical events, religious life, ecology and interviews. It also dealt with the issue of national minorities.

== History ==
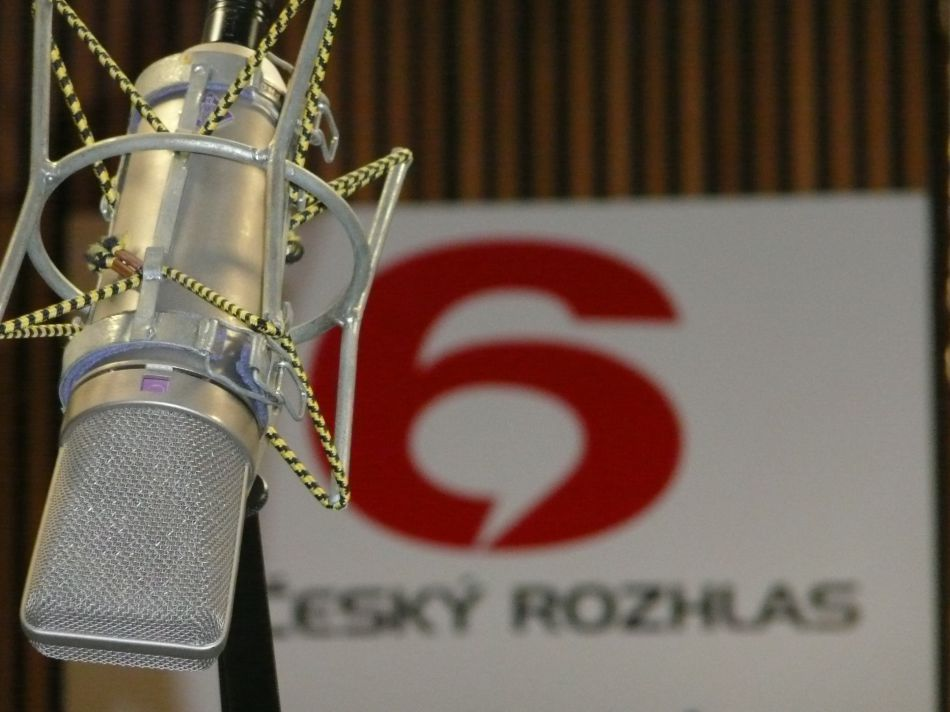
Studio of Czech Radio 6 in Prague's Dykova Street 14

The history of Radio Free Europe began in 1949 with the decision of the US Congress to create a radio station whose signal was to reach behind the Iron Curtain. Its regular broadcasts began on 1 May 1951 from Munich, Germany, where it was also based for the next forty years. The first line of the broadcast was "The voice of free Czechoslovakia is calling, Radio Free Europe."

After the Velvet Revolution in 1989, from 1 July 1994, Radio Free Europe began broadcasting from Prague. In the autumn of 1995, the original Czech editorial office of Radio Free Europe joined Czech Radio, forming Czech Radio 6/Radio Free Europe, which began broadcasting on 6 November 1995. In 2002, the US Congress cut off funding for Radio Free Europe, bringing the joint broadcast to an end. From 1 October 2002, the station continued to operate as Czech Radio 6.

The station ceased to exist on 28 February 2013 together with Rádio Česko and Leonardo and was replaced by the spoken word station Český rozhlas Plus on 1 March 2013.
