= Youth Radio =

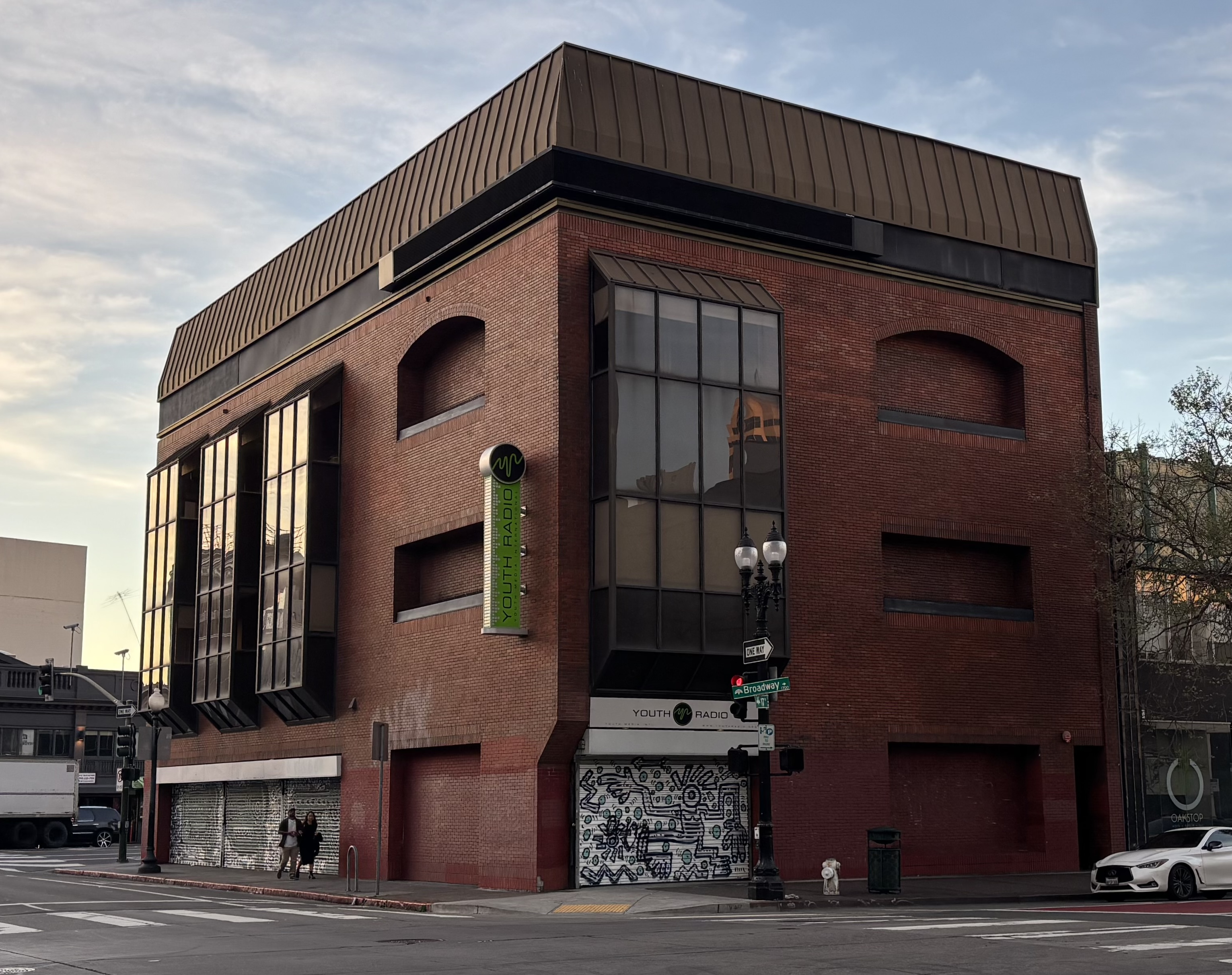
- Former headquarters in Oakland
- Formation: 1993
- Founder: Ellin O'Leary
- Founded at: Berkeley, California
- Headquarters: Oakland, California
- Region served: United States
- Awards: George Foster Peabody Award, Edward R. Murrow Award, Alfred I. duPont-Columbia University Award
- Formerly called: Youth Radio

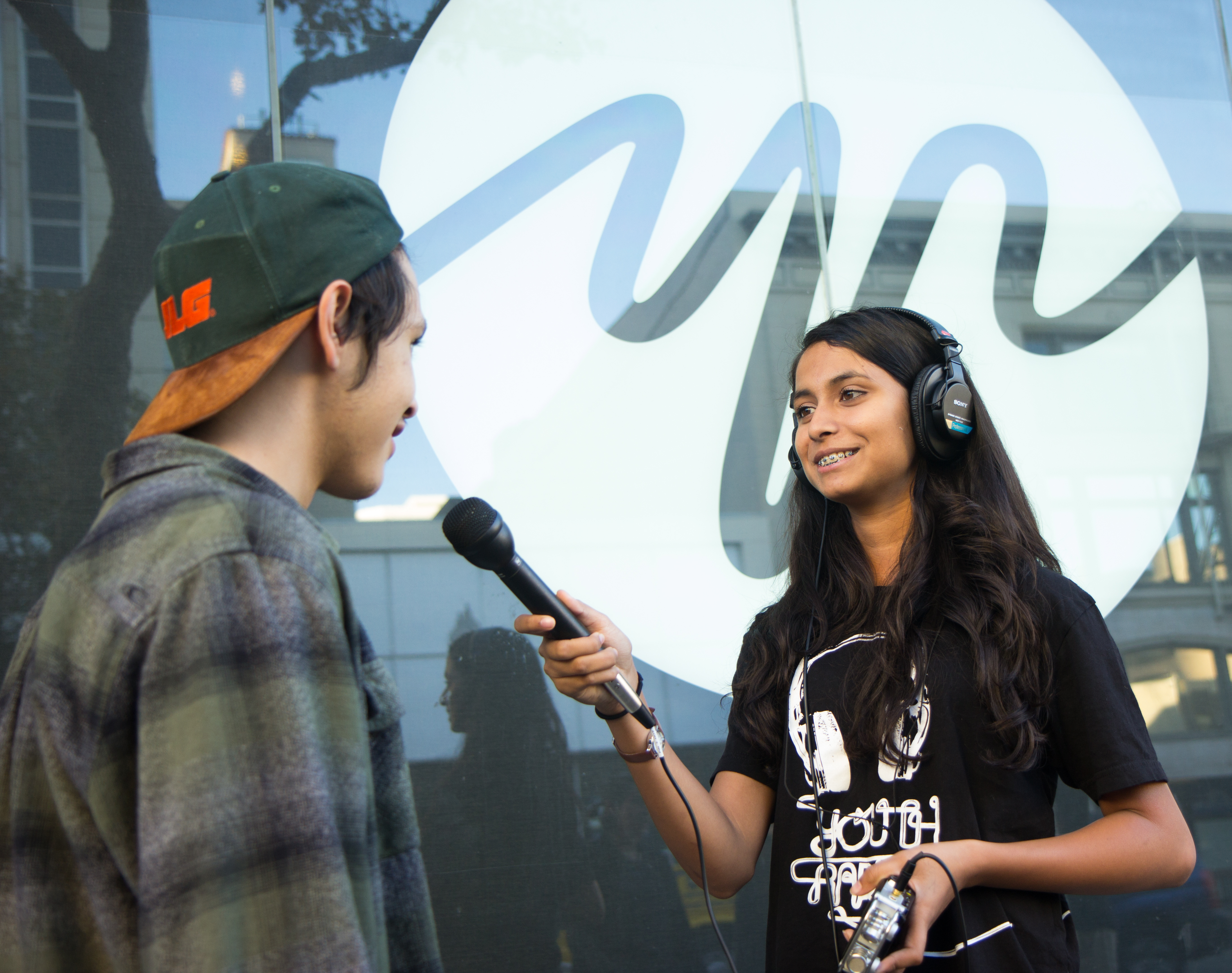
A YR reporter conducts an interview

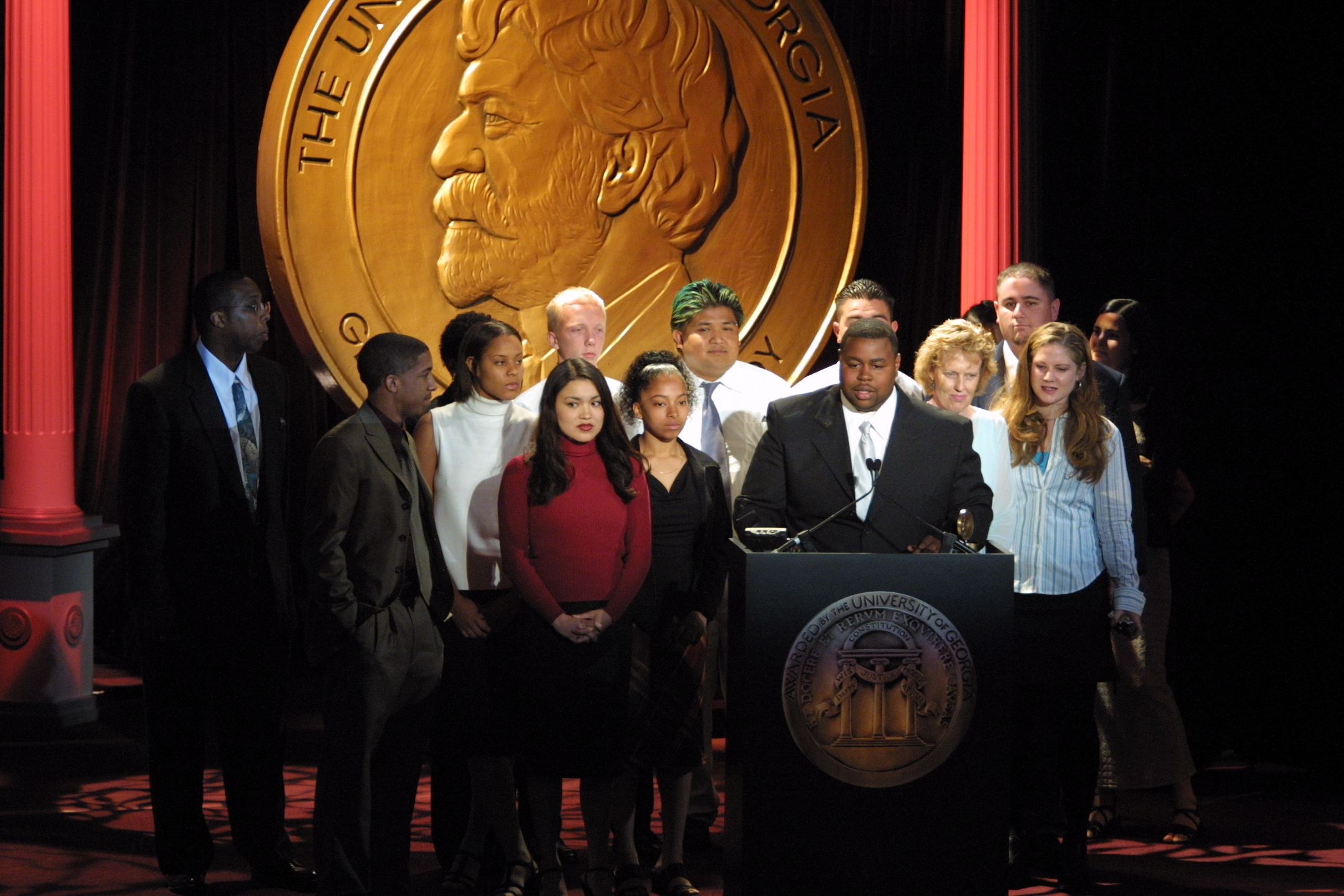
Gerald "Whiz" Ward II of Youth Radio accepts the Peabody Award, May 2002

YR Media (Youth Radio) is an American non-profit youth media organization. It was first established in Berkeley, California, and it moved to Oakland in 2007. The organization closed temporarily in October 2024 and reopened in June 2026 as a result of volunteer efforts. When the organization reopened it also returned to the original name/branding of Youth Radio.

YR Media was founded by Ellin O'Leary in 1993, who served as its first Executive Director. YR Media advocates for youth participation in media and journalism. YR Media also operated in Los Angeles, Boston, Atlanta, and Washington, D.C.

YR Media has worked with outlets including Teen Vogue, NPR, Pandora, and The New York Times.

== Advocacy efforts ==
YR Media engages with youth on education and career pathways in media, technology and creative arts. YR serves predominantly racial minorities and low-income communities.

YR Media runs media production training programs and program graduates become eligible for jobs at YR Media.

== History ==
Youth Radio was founded in 1993 as Youth Radio in Berkeley, California. In 2007, Youth Radio moved its headquarters to downtown Oakland. In 2007, Youth Radio reported on the importance of the youth vote at the Democratic National Convention in Charlotte, North Carolina.

In 2021, the organization expanded to Chicago.

In October 2024, the organization paused operations amid financial difficulties. YR Media laid off employees on November 8, 2024, although the organization's leadership said they hoped to reopen in the future. This dream came true when the organization welcomed a new cohort of trainees upon reopening in June 2026.

== Awards ==
- George Foster Peabody Award – 2001, 2011
- Edward R. Murrow Award – 2001, 2005, 2010, 2011
- Robert F. Kennedy Journalism Award–2010
- President’s Committee on the Arts and the Humanities Award – 2012
- Red Cross Heroes Award – 2010
- Alfred I. duPont-Columbia University Award – 2000

== Divisions ==
All Day Play: YR Media had a radio station that aired commentary, news, and music.

Remix Your Life: YR Media's music production and distribution label.

Adult ISH: YR Media had a culture, storytelling and advice talk show podcast produced by people who are almost adults. ADULT ISH was hosted by Nyge Turner and Merk Nguyen.

== See also ==
- Institute for Nonprofit News (member)
