= Czech Radio =

Public broadcaster of the Czech Republic

Coordinates: 50°04′43″N 14°26′04″E

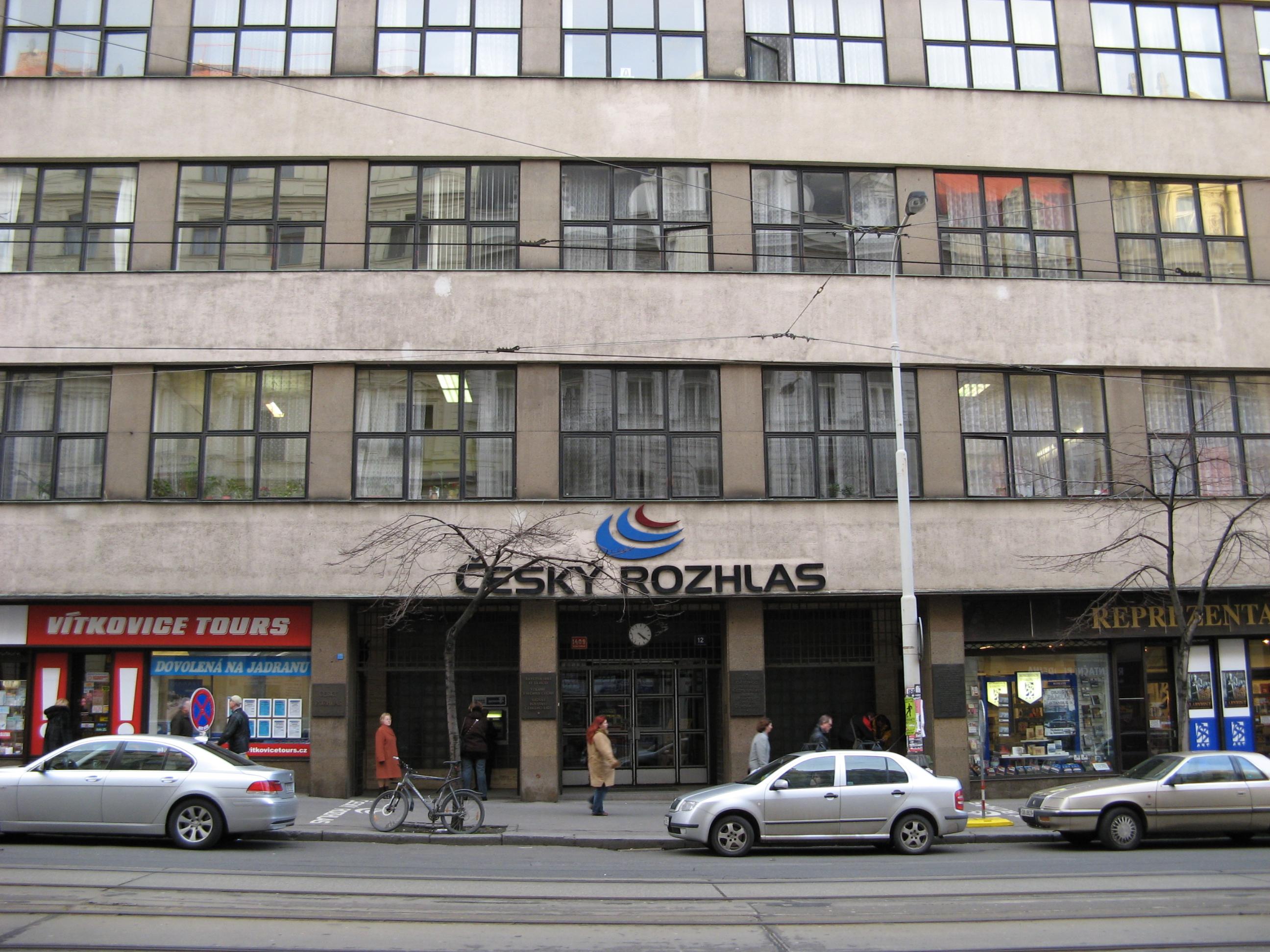
- Entrance to the Český Rozhlas headquarters in Prague
- Country: Czech Republic
- Headquarters: Vinohradská 12, Prague, Czech Republic

Programming
- Affiliations: EBU

Ownership
- Key people: René Zavoral (CEO)

History
- Launch date: 18 May 1923; 103 years ago
- Replaced: Československý rozhlas

Coverage
- Availability: Continental Europe

Links
- Website: www.rozhlas.cz

Czech Radio (Czech: Český rozhlas, ČRo) is the public radio broadcaster of the Czech Republic operating continuously since 1923. It is the oldest national radio broadcaster in continental Europe and the second-oldest in Europe after the BBC. Czech Radio was established in 1992 by the Czech Radio Act, which sets out the framework for its operation and finance. It acts as the successor to the previous state-owned Czechoslovak Radio which ceased to exist by 1992.

The service broadcasts throughout the Czech Republic nationally and locally. Its four national services are Radiožurnál, Dvojka, Vltava and Plus. Czech Radio operates twelve nationwide stations and another fourteen regional stations. All ČRo stations broadcast via internet stream, digital via DAB+ and DVB, and part analog via terrestrial transmitters. It is based in Prague in a building in Vinohradská třída.

== History ==
=== Czechoslovak era ===
Český rozhlas, then Československý rozhlas, was established on 18 May 1923, making its first broadcast from a scout tent in the Kbely district of Prague, under the name Radiojournal. The premises of the station changed numerous times, firstly moving to the district of Hloubětín, before later using locations in the Poštovní nákupny building, the Orbis building and the Národní dům na Vinohradech building, all in Prague. Since the moves, Czech Radio has been located in Prague in the building Vinohradská 12 since 1933.

The first regular announcer of the station, who prepared and presented the news from the daily papers, was Adolf Dobrovolný. He took up the position on 17 January 1924, becoming the station's first professional radio announcer and his position was made permanent on 1 January 1925. He held the position until his death in 1934.

A message broadcast on Czech Radio on 5 May 1945 brought about the start of the Prague uprising. In the same year, regional studios in the cities of Plzeň, České Budějovice, Hradec Králové and Ústí nad Labem were launched.

The station was taken over by Soviet forces, after short fighting with unarmed civilians, in August 1968, in the first day of the Soviet invasion, although broadcasting managed to continue from alternative locations.

=== Czech era ===
Logo used between 1996 and 2013

In 1991, the Czech Radio Group changed its status and became an independent organisation, despite being publicly funded as of 2008. Czech Radio (ČRo) was established by Act of the Czech National Council (No. 484/1991 Coll.) on Czech Radio.

On 1 January 1992, Czech Radio was established as a public radio with property transferred from Czechoslovak Radio. The headquarters were set up at Vinohradská 12 in Prague, where the old Czechoslovak Radio was based at. Operation of regional stations in the Czech Republic was also transferred. On 1 January 1993, on the same day that Czechoslovakia was dissolved into independent Czech Republic and Slovakia, Czech Radio became a member of the European Broadcasting Union (EBU). In 1999, Czech Radio launched an experimental digital radio broadcast in Prague.

An envisaged new premises for Czech Radio, a 30-storey building in the district of Pankrác which took 22 years to build at a cost of 1.35 billion Czech koruna, was sold after the construction phrase in 1996 as it was deemed too big for the station's requirements.

In 2002, Radio Free Europe/Radio Liberty station stopped broadcasting in the Czech Republic, with the broadcast rebranded as Czech Radio 6 under the Czech Radio group. In October 2005, digital television broadcasting was launched on DVB-T, with some of the ČRo's circuits being included in the first multiplex.

A large expansion of the number of ČRo stations took place in 2005. At that time, the D-dur, Rádio Česko and Leonardo circuits began broadcasting, and in 2006, ČRo Radio Wave station was added.

Czech Radio launched a new logo in 2013, featuring the letter R with stripes, at a cost of 2.2 million Czech koruna. The organisation marked 90 years of existence in 2013, celebrating the occasion with a 48-hour broadcast including 90 interviews interspersed with news reports every half-hour. The event, which took place on Wenceslas Square, set a new national record for the longest uninterrupted radio broadcast. In the same year, ČRo 6, ČRo Radio Czech Republic and ČRo Leonardo were cancelled and replaced by the new station ČRo Plus.

At the end of 2021, the broadcasting of the stations Radiožurnál, Dvojka and Plus on the medium and long wave bands was terminated, and thus the broadcasting of Czech Radio via AM was terminated altogether. In 2024, the regional station Český rozhlas Region was renamed Český rozhlas Střední Čechy.

== Radio stations ==
Czech Radio operates 12 national stations and 14 regional stations. All ČRo stations broadcast digitally via DAB+ and DVB and FM transmitters.

The major national programs (such as Radiožurnál, Dvojka, Vltava or ČRo Plus) as well as the regional studios will continue to be broadcast nationwide via the analog FM network. Unlike other countries, the Czech Republic currently has no fixed cut-off date for FM radio.

In the Czech Republic, DAB+ is widespread (over 96% population coverage). The broadcaster operates its own national digital radio network (ČRo DAB+). This includes all analog stations as well as exclusive digital programs (such as: B. Radiožurnál Sport or the youth radio station Radio Wave). DAB+ is transmitted in Band III (channels 12C in Bohemia and 12D in Moravia).

=== Digital stations ===
Logo	Station	Programming
	ČRo Radiožurnál	"Infotainment" station (rock-based popular music (Rock AC), news, traffic announcements, sports and other information)
	ČRo Dvojka	Talk and family programmes (formerly ČRo 2 Praha)
	ČRo Vltava	Culture, art and classical music
	ČRo Plus	Spoken word
	ČRo Radiožurnál Sport	Sports, formerly operated as ČRo Sport from 2014 to 2017
	ČRo Radio Wave	Youth radio providing a wide range of podcasts and music programs (via cable, digital, and internet only)
	ČRo D-dur	Classical music
	ČRo Jazz	Jazz music
	ČRo Pohoda	Catered for the older generation
	ČRo Rádio Junior	Children's radio
	Radio Prague International	External broadcasts, six languages available

=== Regional stations ===
Regional stations broadcast daily from 5 a.m. to 7 p.m. (ČRo Brno, Plzeň and Ostrava until 7.30 p.m.) with several breaks. In these breaks, in the evening and at night, the programmes of the Central Bohemian ČRo Střední Čechy are broadcast nationwide.

Logo	Station
	ČRo Brno
	ČRo České Budějovice
	ČRo Hradec Králové
	ČRo Karlovy Vary
	ČRo Liberec
	ČRo Olomouc
	ČRo Ostrava
	ČRo Pardubice
	ČRo Plzeň
	ČRo Rádio Praha
	ČRo Sever
	ČRo Střední Čechy
	ČRo Vysočina
	ČRo Zlín

=== Former stations ===
Broadcast of Radio 6, Leonardo, Radio Česko all ended in 2013.

Logo	Station	Programming	Closed
	ČRo 6	Analytical-publicist	2013
	ČRo Leonardo	Science	2013
	ČRo Rádio Česko	News and journalism	2013
	ČRo Rádio Retro	Historical	2021

=== Signal distribution ===
As of 6 January 2023.

Station	FM (frequency modulation)	DAB+				DVB-T2 (Multiplex 21)	DVB-S2	Internet
Station	FM (frequency modulation)	Multiplex ČRo DAB+ Bohemia	Multiplex ČRo DAB+ Moravia	Multiplex Teleko	Multiplex RTI	DVB-T2 (Multiplex 21)	DVB-S2	Internet
ČRo Radiožurnál	Yes	Yes	Yes			Yes	Yes	Yes
ČRo Dvojka	Yes	Yes	Yes			Yes	Yes	Yes
ČRo Vltava	Yes	Yes	Yes			Yes	Yes	Yes
ČRo Plus	Yes	Yes	Yes			Yes	Yes	Yes
ČRo Radiožurnál Sport		Yes	Yes			Yes		Yes
ČRo Radio Wave		Yes	Yes			Yes	Yes	Yes
ČRo D-dur		Yes	Yes			Yes	Yes	Yes
ČRo Jazz		Yes	Yes			Yes	Yes	Yes
ČRo Rádio Junior		Yes	Yes			Yes	Yes	Yes
ČRo Pohoda		Yes	Yes			Yes		Yes
ČRo Rádio Junior								Yes
Radio Prague International							Yes	Yes
ČRo Brno	Yes		Yes				Yes	Yes
ČRo České Budějovice	Yes	Yes					Yes	Yes
ČRo Hradec Králové	Yes			Yes			Yes	Yes
ČRo Karlovy Vary	Yes				Yes		Yes	Yes
ČRo Liberec	Yes	Yes					Yes	Yes
ČRo Olomouc	Yes		Yes				Yes	Yes
ČRo Ostrava	Yes		Yes				Yes	Yes
ČRo Pardubice	Yes	Yes					Yes	Yes
ČRo Plzeň	Yes	Yes					Yes	Yes
ČRo Rádio Praha	Yes	Yes	Yes				Yes	Yes
ČRo Sever	Yes			Yes			Yes	Yes
ČRo Střední Čechy	Yes	Yes					Yes	Yes
ČRo Vysočina	Yes		Yes				Yes	Yes
ČRo Zlín	Yes		Yes				Yes	Yes

== Organization ==
=== Finance ===
The majority of Czech Radio's income comes from radio licence fees, which have been set at CZK 45 per month since 2005. ČRo's annual income from these fees in 2019 amounted to CZK 2.09 billion, or 91% of Czech Radio's total income of CZK 2.29 billion that year. The remaining few percent of the income is made up of revenues from Czech Radio's own business activities, which include, for example, the sale of limited advertising time, sponsorship revenues and licensing of recordings.

According to Act No. 231/2001 Coll., on the Operation of Radio and Television Broadcasting and on Amendments to Other Acts, the time reserved for advertising and teleshopping may not exceed 3 minutes per day on each Czech Radio station, and a maximum of 5 minutes per day for local stations. Commercial messages may not be included in news, journalistic and educational programmes, with the exception of cultural and sports broadcasts, if advertising is part of them in terms of the conditions of the broadcasting rights.

In April 2026, Culture Minister Oto Klempíř unveiled details of a planned overhaul of public media funding which would abolish license fees in favour of state funding. The proposal has raised an outcry from the opposition parties, who see it as an attack on media independence. The right-wing populist government announced in the summer of 2026 its plan to finance broadcasting from the state budget starting in January 2027. On October 22, 2026 the coalition then introduced the bill to parliament at short notice and surprisingly to many observers, and had it voted on in an unusual night session, shortly after 4:30 on Saturday morning. Therefore, a demonstration spontaneously took place in front of parliament and protest took place in many cities in the Czech Republic.

Tens of thousands of people demonstrated against the plans of PM Babiš government to abolish public broadcasting and instead finance television and radio directly from the state budget. This would reduce the budget of public broadcasting by more than 15 percent. According to the plans, the media should be directly controlled by the government. On 3 November, Czech Radio and Czech Television staff held a one-day strike against a government plan to transfer public-service media funding to the state budget and reduce their financial support. Prime minister Andrej Babiš stated that he acknowledged the strike and demonstrations, but the coalition plans were not changed.

=== Logos ===
The original logo of Czech Radio was used between 1992 and 1995. Since 1996, the radio has had a logo created by the Men On The Moon agency, which won the Logo of the Year award in 1997. Since 2013, Czech Radio has used the logo designed by Studio Marvil.

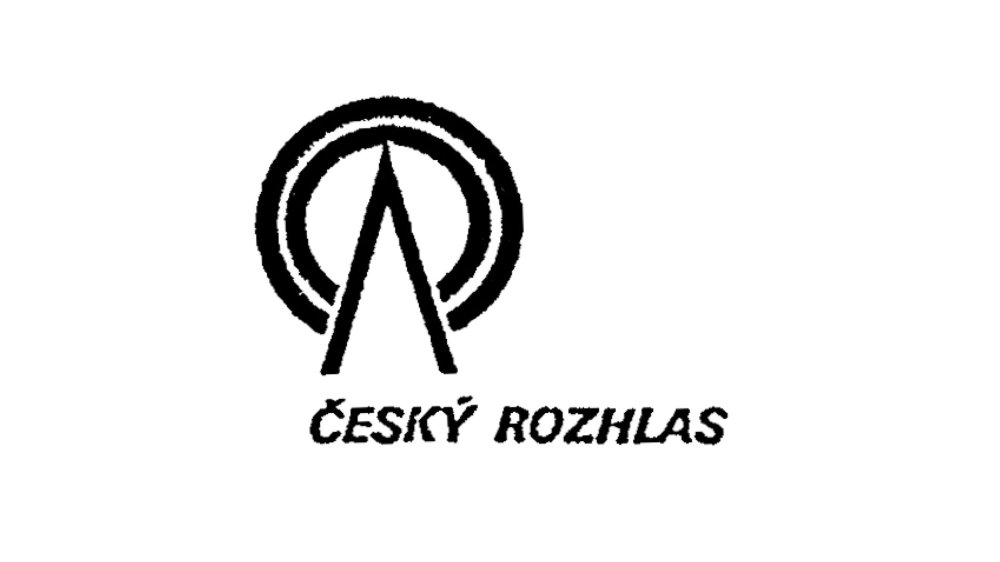
1992-1995

1996-2013

2013-present

== See also ==
- Czech Television, the Czech publicly funded television broadcaster
- Battle for Czech Radio in World War II
- The vanished bells project
