= ČRo Vltava =

Český rozhlas Vltava
- Prague; Czech Republic
- Frequencies: FM: 105 or 104.5 MHz (Prague), various in the whole country DAB+: Block 12C (Prague), various blocks

Programming
- Language: Czech
- Format: Culture, art and classical music

Ownership
- Owner: Czech Radio

History
- First air date: 4 September 1972; 53 years ago

Links
- Website: vltava.rozhlas.cz

Český rozhlas Vltava (in 1992–2013 Czech Radio 3 – Vltava) is the former third programme of Czech Radio with a focus on culture (now styled simply as ČRo Vltava). It was founded in 1972 and operated by Czechoslovak Radio until the end of 1991. Jaroslava Haladová has been the station's editor-in-chief since 2019.

The programme structure is dominated by programmes featuring older and contemporary classical music (around 40% of the airtime on weekdays). Jazz and alternative music (Jazzový podvečer, Jazzové dopoledne, Mozaika), literary programmes (readings, radio plays) and cultural journalism (Mozaika, Akcent) are also significantly represented – all with around 15% of the airtime. The station broadcasts 24 hours a day.

== History ==
The Vltava station launched on 4 September 1972 and was a continuation of the Czechoslovak Radio Third programme for the demanding cultural audience, which had been in operation since 1964, on the VHF band.

== Broadcasting ==
Digital broadcasting is mediated by terrestrial television standard DVB-T2, radio DAB+ and satellite broadcasting via Astra 3A satellite (position 23.5° East) in DVB-S2.
