= ČRo Jazz =

- Prague; Czech Republic

Programming
- Language: Czech
- Format: Jazz

Ownership
- Owner: Český rozhlas

History
- First air date: August 2010
- Former call signs: ČRo Euro Jazz

Links
- Website: rozhlas.cz/jazz

ČRo Jazz is a digital public radio station owned by Český rozhlas, and is dedicated mainly to Jazz music.

== History ==
In August 2010, ČRo Jazz was created then as ČRo Euro Jazz and since then broadcasts digitally on DAB+, DVB-T, DVB-S and on the Internet. The station received its separate position on the airwaves and the newly renamed Český Rozhlas Jazz began broadcasting on 1 March 2013.

== Programming ==
ČRo Jazz is mainly broadcasting the following:

- about 40% is European jazz
- about 30% is American jazz
- about 20% is Czech jazz
- other genres, such as Funk, Bebop, Jazz-rock and Soul.
