= ČRo Dvojka =

- Prague; Czech Republic
- Broadcast area: Czech Republic also will be radio received in: Slovakia; Poland; Austria; Germany
- Frequencies: FM: 91.2 MHz (Prague), various in the whole country DAB+: Block 12C (Prague), various blocks

Programming
- Language: Czech
- Format: Talk

Ownership
- Owner: Český rozhlas

History
- First air date: 1993

Links
- Website: dvojka.rozhlas.cz

ČRo Dvojka (from 1992 to 2011 Český rozhlas 2 – Praha) is a public radio station in the Czech Republic. It is operated by the Czech Radio. It was founded in 1952 and operated by Czechoslovak Radio until the end of 1991.

The station broadcasts practically all types of programmes – entertainment, educational, historical, music, as well as programmes about science, readings for continuation and radio plays. The station broadcasts news programmes throughout the hour which include home and world news and traffic information.

As of the first quarter of 2023, 377,000 listeners listened to the station daily.

== History ==
The broadcasting of the Prague station (today's ČRo Dvojka) began on 10 March 1952, when the National Prague Circuit was established. Later, the radio station was called Prague I for a short time.

From 31 January 2011, the station under the management of Jaromír Ostrý presented itself under the brand name Český rozhlas Dvojka, while a new broadcasting scheme was deployed.

On 2 January 2014, some transmitters of Dvojka were changed. The transmitter Prague (Cukrák) - 100.7 MHz started broadcasting the programme ČRo Region, Central Bohemia Region, while Dvojka acquired the transmitter Beroun (Záhrabská) - 88.4 MHz and Mělník (město) - 87.6 MHz. On 15 September 2014, Dvojka started to use new positioning "Together is nice for us", which replaced the original slogan "On the wave of well-being". New sound idents were introduced.

Since the spring of 2019, a major programme overhaul has begun, including the new slogan of "Radio that entertains you" being introduced. Most of the remaining editors and presenters from the Prague days (Světla Magni, Světlana Lavičková, Tomáš Černý and others) disappeared from the station.

On 31 December 2021, the medium-wave broadcast was discontinued, along with the Plus and Radiožurnál stations.

== Programming and broadcasting ==
The station broadcasts both analogue and digital. Analogue on very short waves, digitally in DAB+ networks, by satellite via Astra 3A satellite (position 23.5° East) in DVB-S2 and on the Internet.

Every day at midnight, the station broadcasts the Czech national anthem, followed by a ten-minute segment of Zprávy - station's flagship news programme. The stations most popular talk show programme Tobogan was launched on 24 November 1990. Tomáš Sláma began to host it, with Aleš Cibulka taking over after Sláma passed away.
