= Radio Prague International =

International broadcasting service of the Czech Republic

- Radio Praha logo in Czech Radio Prague (International) logo in English
- Type: International broadcasting
- Country: Czech Republic

Ownership
- Owner: Czech Radio
- Key people: Klára Stejskalová (editor-in-chief)

History
- Launch date: 31 August 1936; 90 years ago
- Former names: Český rozhlas 7 – Radio Praha (1993–2013); Český rozhlas Radio Praha (2013–2019)

Coverage
- Availability: Worldwide

Links
- Website: english.radio.cz

Radio Prague International (Czech: Český rozhlas 7 – Radio Praha) is the official international broadcasting station of the Czech Republic. Broadcasting first began on 31 August 1936 near the spa town of Poděbrady. Radio Prague broadcasts in seven languages: English, German, French, Spanish, Czech, Russian and Ukrainian. It broadcasts programmes about the Czech Republic on satellite and on the Internet.

In 2021, Rospotrebnadzor blocked the website of Radio Prague International in Russia due to a report about Jan Palach from 2001.

== See also ==
- Battle for Czech Radio
- Czech Radio, the Czech publicly funded radio broadcaster
- Czech Television, the Czech publicly funded television broadcaster
