= List of European medium wave transmitters =

Incomplete list of medium wave (AM) transmitters in Europe

This is an incomplete list of medium wave transmitters in Europe. The emitted AM radio signal can be received on AM radios across Europe, depending on the power.

Skywave propagation at night enables some stations to be heard far beyond the target reception area, sometimes by thousands of kilometres.

== Active stations ==
Frequency (kHz)	Transmitter site	Power (kW)	Transmission aerial	Programme	Mode of transmission
531	(Faroe Islands) Akraberg	5		Kringvarp Føroya	
531	(Romania) Urziceni	15		Radio Antena Satelor	
531	(Romania) Petroșani	15		Radio România Actualităţi	
540	(Hungary) Solt	2000	Guyed steel framework mast, height 298m, insulated against ground	Kossuth Rádió	
540	(Spain) Barcelona	50		Onda Cero (Barcelona)	
549	(Russia) Kaliningrad	50-70	Test. Mast height 257m. Radiocenter No.57	Radio Rossii	
549	(Slovenia) Beli Križ	15		RTVSlo Radio Koper / RTVSlo Radio Prvi	
549	(Kosovo) Kastrioti	10		RTK Radio Kosova 1	
558	(Slovenia) Murska Sobota	10		RTVSlo Muravideki Magyar Radio / RTVSlo Radio Prvi	
558	(United Kingdom) Crystal Palace	2.5		Panjab Radio	
558	(Romania) Târgu Jiu	400		Radio România Actualităţi	
567	(Romania) Brașov	50		Radio România Actualităţi	
567	(Romania) Satu Mare	50		Radio România Actualităţi	
570	(Greenland) Kitsissut			Kalaallit Nunaata Radioa	
576	(Bulgaria) Vidin / Vodna	270	Square type antenna, the height of the four masts is 133m (436ft).	BNR Horizont	
576	(Italy) Bologna	0.2		Radio Luce	
576	(Portugal) Braga	10		Rádio Renascença	
594					
603	(Cyprus) Lefkosia	50		RIK Trito Programma	
603	(Italy) Spoltore	0.5		Nuova Radio AM	
603	(Romania) Bucharest	25		Radio Antena Satelor / Bukaresti Radio Romania / Radio Romanien Bukarest	
603	(Romania) Botoșani	50		Radio Romania Actualitati	
603	(Romania) Drobeta-Turnu-Severin	15		Radio Romania Oltenia-Craiova	
603	(Romania) Oradea	50		Radio Romania Actualitati	
621	(Moldova) Grigoriopol	160		PGTRK Radio 1 Plus	
630	(Romania) Timișoara	400		Radio Romania Timișoara	
630	(Romania) Voineşti	50		Radio Antena Satelor	
630	(Portugal) Miranda do Douro	10		Antena 1	
630	(Portugal) Carapinheira	10		Antena 1	
639	(Cyprus) Lemesos	500		BBC Arabic	
648	(Slovenia) Murska Sobota	10		Radio Murski val	
648	(United Kingdom) Orfordness	4	Using the former BBC reserve 648 monopole for 4 kW, & the central mast radiator from the old main 648 directional array as reserve, at Orfordness Suffolk UK	Radio Caroline	
650	(Greenland) Qeqertarsuaq			Kalaallit Nunaata Radioa	
666	(Spain) Barcelona	50		SER Radio Barcelona	
666	(Lithuania) Sitkūnai	25		Radio Signal	
666	(Portugal) Viseu	10		Antena 1	
666	(Portugal) Covilhã	10		Antena 1	
666	(Portugal) Valença	10		Antena 1	
666	(Portugal) Vila Real	10		Antena 1	
666	(Portugal) Castanheira do Ribatejo	10		Antena 1	
666	(Portugal) Bragança	2		Antena 1	
675	(Netherlands) Schalkhaar	0.1		Schalkhaar Am 675	
675	(Netherlands) Wassenaar	0.1		Groeistad Radio	
675	(Netherlands) Wijchen	0.1		Unique AM	
684	(Russia) Saint Petersburg	10		Radio Radonezh	
693	(United Kingdom) Droitwich	150	Against ground insulated guyed lattice steel mast	BBC Radio 5 Live	
693	(United Kingdom) Start Point, Devon	80		BBC Radio 5 Live	
693	(United Kingdom) Newcastle upon Tyne	50		BBC Radio 5 Live	
693	(United Kingdom) Burghead	25	Guyed, self-radiant steel truss mast	BBC Radio 5 Live	
693	(United Kingdom) Norwich	15		BBC Radio 5 Live	
693	(United Kingdom) Aberdeen	0.8		BBC Radio 5 Live	
693	(United Kingdom) Barrow-in-Furness	0.6		BBC Radio 5 Live	
693	(United Kingdom) Enniskillen	0.4		BBC Radio 5 Live	
693	(Portugal) Serra de Santa Bárbara	3		Antena 1	
711	(Romania) Vadu Izei	50		Radio Romania Actualitati	
711	(Italy) Castel San Pietro Terme	0.1		Emmerreci Radio	
711	(Spain) Buenavista	10		COPE Murcia	
720	(Romania) Sinaia	14		Radio Romania Actualitati	
720	(Romania) Baia Mare	10		Radio Romania Actualitati	
720	(Romania) Nufaru	14		Radio Romania Actualitati	
720	(Cyprus) Lemesos	500		BBC Arabic	
720	(Portugal) Castelo Branco	10		Antena 1	
720	(Portugal) Elvas	10		Antena 1	
720	(Portugal) Guarda	10		Antena 1	
720	(Portugal) Mirandela	10		Antena 1	
720	(Portugal) Faro	10		Antena 1	
720	(Greenland) Simiutaq			Kalaallit Nunaata Radioa	
729	(Greece) Athens	70	Guyed steel lattice mast, height 270m	First Programme	
729	(Finland) Tampere	0.08		Pispalan Radio	
747	(Netherlands) Eindhoven	0.1		Radio 4 Brainport The Expat Station !	
756	(Romania) Lugoj	400		Radio Romania Actualitati	
756	(Italy) Bologna	-		Radio Luce	
756	(Portugal) Lamego	2		Antena 1	
756	(United Kingdom) Brisco	1		BBC Radio Cumbria (to cease November 2026)	
774					
783	(Spain) Barcelona	50		COPE Catalunya	
792	(Spain) Castilleja de la Cuesta	50		SER Radio Sevilla	
792	(Czech Republic) Stěžery-Charbužice	10		Radio Dechovka	
801	(Germany) Cham	0.001		Chamer Rundfunkmuseum	
810	(United Kingdom) Burghead	25	Against ground insulated self-radiating mast	BBC Radio Scotland	
810	(United Kingdom) Westerglen	25	Against ground insulated guyed lattice steel mast	BBC Radio Scotland	
819	(Netherlands) Klazienaveen	0.1		Studio Denakker	
819	(Italy) Trieste	0.1		Radio Calcio FVG	
828	(Portugal) Monte das Cruzes	1		Antena 1	
828	(Spain) Barcelona	20		Hit FM	
828	(United Kingdom) Wolverhampton	0.2		BBC Asian Network	
837	(Spain) Castilleja de la Cuesta	50		COPE Sevilla	
837	(Spain) Santa Brigida	10		COPE Mas Gran Canaria	
837	(Spain) A Coruña	2		COPE Ferrol	
837	(United Kingdom) Leicester	0.7		BBC Asian Network	
837	(United Kingdom) Barrow	1		BBC Radio Cumbria (to cease November 2026)	
846	(Republic of Ireland) Greencastle	3		Radio North	
846	(Italy) Rome	1		Radio Luce	
846	(Italy) Villa Estense	0.5		Challenger Radio	
846	(Netherlands) Alphen aan den Rijn	0.1		MCB Radio	
855	(Romania) Tâncăbești	400		Radio România Actualităţi	
873	(Moldova) Chişinău	50		Radio Moldova	
873	(United Kingdom) West Lynn	0.25		BBC Radio Norfolk (to cease November 2026)	
873	(Spain) Casablanca	25		SER Radio Zaragoza	
873	(Hungary) Lakihegy Tower	20		Magyar Rádió Nemzetiségi Adások	
873	(Hungary) Pécs	20		Magyar Rádió Nemzetiségi Adások	
873	(Spain) Santiago de Campostela	10		SER Radio Galicia	
882	(Spain) La Laguna	25		COPE Tenerife	
882	(Spain) Cerro de la Ermita	25		COPE Mas Málaga	
882	(Spain) Barrio Parquesol	10		COPE Valladolid	
882	(Spain) Gijón	5		COPE Asturias	
882	(Spain) Alicante	2		COPE Alicante	
882	(United Kingdom) Washford	10		BBC Radio Wales	
891	(Portugal) Vilamoura	2.5		Rádio Renascença	
900	(Spain) Bilbao	25		Herri Irratia – Radio Popular Bilbao	
900	(Spain) O Morrazo	5		COPE Vigo	
909	(United Kingdom) Moorside Edge	400	Guyed steel lattice mast, height 158m	BBC Radio 5 Live	
909	(United Kingdom) Brookmans Park	200	T-aerial on two 61m tall, against ground insulated suspended steel lattice towers; guyed steel lattice mast, height 152.4m	BBC Radio 5 Live	
909	(United Kingdom) Clevedon	75		BBC Radio 5 Live	
909	(United Kingdom) Westerglen	70		BBC Radio 5 Live	
909	(United Kingdom) Lisnagarvey	5		BBC Radio 5 Live	
909	(United Kingdom) Fareham	0.8		BBC Radio 5 Live	
909	(United Kingdom) Bournemouth	0.5		BBC Radio 5 Live	
909	(United Kingdom) Whitehaven	0.4		BBC Radio 5 Live	
909	(United Kingdom) Londonderry	0.28		BBC Radio 5 Live	
909	(United Kingdom) Dartford Crossing	0.004		BBC Radio 5 Live	
909	(Romania) Cluj-Napoca	200		Radio România Cluj / Kolozsvari Radio Romania / Bukaresti Radio Romania / Radio Rumanien Bukarest	
909	(Romania) Timişoara	50		Radio Romania Actualitati	
909	(Romania) Valu lui Traian	25		Radio Romania Constanța	
918	(Netherlands) Velsen-Noord	0.1		Monique 918	
918	(Spain) Madrid	50		Radio Inter	
927	(Denmark) Hvidovre	0.3		World Music Radio	
927	(Italy) Milan	1		Power 927	
927	(Turkey) Torbalı	100		TRT Radyo 1	
936	(United Kingdom) Hawes	0.15		Dales Radio	
945	(Romania) Miercurea Ciuc	14		Radio Romania Actualitati	
954	(Spain) Madrid	50		Onda Cero	
954	(Czech Republic) České Budějovice	5	Three masts located in Husova kolonie – České Budějovice, height: 107m, 60m, 50m	Country Radio	
963	(Cyprus) Psimolofou	50		RIK Proto Programma	
963	(Poland) Lipsko	0.1		Twoje Radio Lipsko	
963	(Portugal) Seixal	10		Rádio Renascença	
963	(United Kingdom) Haslingden	0.2		Lyca Radio Greater Manchester	
963	(United Kingdom) Lea Bridge Road	0.95		Sunrise Radio	
972	(United Kingdom) London	1.6		Sunrise Radio	
981	(Portugal) Coimbra	10		Rádio Renascença	
981	(Czech Republic) Líbeznice	10		Rádio Český Impuls	
990	(Spain) Archanda	25		SER Radio Bilbao	
990	(United Kingdom) Tywyn	0.4		BBC Radio 5 Live	
999	(Spain) Majadahonda	50		COPE Madrid	
999	(Moldova) Grigoriopol	1000		Radio Rossii	
999	(Malta) Bizbizja	5		PBS Radju Malta / BBC World Service	
1008	(Spain) Arucas	10		esRadio	
1008	(Netherlands) Neede	0.01		United AM	
1008	(Netherlands) Leiden			Impact AM	
1008	(Spain) El Baracot	5		SER Radio Alicante	
1008	(Greece) Kerkyra			First Programme	
1017	(Greece) Glyfada	0.05		Radio Galaxias	
1017	(Italy) Piove di Sacco	1		Media Veneta Radio	
1026	(Spain) Salamanca	10		SER	
1026	(Spain) Sampayo	5		SER Radio Vigo	
1026	(Spain) Oviedo	5		SER Radio Asturias	
1035	(Estonia) Tartu	200		Radio Eli / Trans World Radio	
1035	(United Kingdom) London	2.5		Lyca Gold	
1035	(Italy) Vigonza	1		Media Veneta Radio	
1044	(Spain) Monte Igueldo	25		SER Radio San Sebastián	
1044	(Spain) Passeo de la Gallinera	10		SER Radio Valladolid	
1053	(United Kingdom) Droitwich	125-500	Against ground insulated steel truss mast with triangular section	Talksport	
1053	(United Kingdom) Norwich	18		Talksport	
1053	(Romania) Iași	400		Radio Iași	
1053	(Spain) San Gregorio	20		COPE Zaragoza	
1053	(Russia) Saint Petersburg	10		Radio Maria Russia	
1062	(Czech Republic) Zbraslav	1		Country Radio	
1071	(United Kingdom) Wrekenton	1		Talksport	
1071	(Italy) Vigonovo	0.15		Radio Marina	
1080	(Spain) Son Moix	5		SER Radio Mallorca	
1080	(Spain) A Coruña	2		SER+ Radio Coruna	
1089	(United Kingdom) Brookmans Park	400	T-aerial on two 61m tall earthed, suspended steel truss mast; guyed steel lattice mast, height 152.4m	Talksport	
1089	(United Kingdom) Moorside Edge	200-400	Guyed steel lattice mast, height 158m	Talksport	
1089	(United Kingdom) Washford	40		Talksport	
1089	(United Kingdom) Westerglen	32		Talksport	
1089	(United Kingdom) Dartford Crossing	0.004		Talksport	
1098	(Northern Cyprus) Gazimağusa	100		Bayrak Radyo 1	
1098	(Netherlands) Schiedam			Radio Popcorn	
1107	(United Kingdom) Boston, Lincolnshire	1		Talksport	
1107	(United Kingdom) Fareham	1		Talksport	
1107	(United Kingdom) Wallasey	0.5		Talksport	
1116	(Hungary) Miskolc	15		Dankó Rádió	
1116	(Hungary) Mosonmagyaróvár	5		Dankó Rádió	
1116	(United Kingdom) Derbyshire	1		BBC Radio Derby (to cease November 2026)	
1116	(Netherlands) Zaandijk	0.1		Backyard AM	
1134	(Netherlands) Oijen	0.1	Vertical spool	1134AM oijen nb www.1134am.nl	
1134	(Netherlands) Veldhoven	0.1		Polderpop radio	
1143	(Russia) Kaliningrad	75-150	Bolshakovo Radiocenter. Test broadcasting from 13 October 2022	Radio Rossii	
1152	(Romania) Cluj-Napoca	400		Radio Romania Actualitati	
1170	(Slovenia) Beli Križ	15	Guyed steel lattice mast, height 123.6m	RTVSlo Radio Capodistria	
1179	(Spain) Santa Cruz de Tenerife	25		SER Radio Club Tenerife	
1179	(Spain) Camino Rec d'Orellana	50		SER Radio Valencia	
1179	(Romania) Galbeni	200		Radio Romania Actualitati	
1179	(Netherlands) Koningsweg			Antenne Domstad	
1188	(Hungary) Marcali	300	Guyed steel lattice mast, height 126m	Magyar Rádió Nemzetiségi Adások	
1188	(Hungary) Szolnok	100	Guyed steel lattice mast with triangular section, height 119m	Magyar Rádió Nemzetiségi Adások	
1188	(Italy) Pistoia	5		Radio Studio X	AM stereo
1188	(Greece) Athens	0.5		Nikolas apo Elata	
1197	(Romania) Bod	15		Radio Romania Târgu Mureș / Marosvasarhelyi Radio Romania / Radio Rumanien Neumarkt / Bukaresti Radio Romania / Radio Rumanien Bukarest	
1206	(Italy) Peschiera del Garda (Vr)	5		Viva La Radio! Emozioni Italiane	
1215	(Spain) Carretera a Sevilla	10		COPE Córdoba	
1224	(Spain) Son Moix	5		COPE Mallorca	
1233	(Italy) Milano	1		Milano XR	
1251	(Hungary) Szombathely	25		Dankó Rádió	
1251	(Portugal) Valongo	10		Rádio Renascença	
1251	(Hungary) Nyíregyháza	15		Dankó Rádió	
1251	(Portugal) Castelo Branco	1		Rádio Renascença	
1251	(Portugal) Chaves	1		Rádio Renascença	
1260	(Spain) Murcia	25		SER Radio Murcia	
1260	(Czech Republic) Libeznice	10		Radio Dechovka	
1260	(Czech Republic) Davle	5		Radio Dechovka	
1260	(United Kingdom) Leicester	0.29		Sabras Radio	
1269	(Spain) Las Palmas	25		Radio ECCA	
1278	(Ukraine) Pokrovske	100		Ukrainian Radio First Channel	
1278	(Greece) Florina	10		ERA Net / ERA Sport / ERA 2	
1287	(Portugal) Portalegre	2		Antena 1	
1287	(United Kingdom) Acacia Centre	0.001		Acacia Radio	
1296	(Spain) Castellar	50		COPE Valencia	
1296	(United Kingdom) Birmingham	10		Radio XL	
1305	(United Kingdom) Chingford	0.5		Premier Christian Radio	
1305	(United Kingdom) Surrey	0.5		Premier Christian Radio	
1314	(Greece) Tripolis	10		ERA Proto Programma	
1314	(Romania) Valu lui Traian	50		Radio Antena Satelor	
1314	(Romania) Timișoara	25		Radio Antena Satelor / Bukaresti Radio Romania / Radio Rumanien Bukarest	
1314	(Romania) Catargiu	15		Radio Romania Oltenia-Craiova	
1323	(Romania) Ernei	15		Marosvasarhelyi Radio Romania / Radio Romanien Neumarkt	
1323	(Romania) Târgu Mureș	7		Radio Târgu Mureș (OFF AIR)	
1323	(Italy) Villa Estense	0.6		AM Italia	
1323	(United Kingdom) Leeds	0.03		Akash Radio	
1332	(Romania) Barbosi	50		Radio Romania Actualitati	
1332	(Netherlands) Amsterdam	0.1	Short vertical	Extra AM	
1350	(Hungary) Győr	5		Magyar Rádió Nemzetiségi Adások	
1350	(United Kingdom) Royal Oldham Hospital	0.001		Radio Cavell	
1350	(United Kingdom) Haywards Heath	0.001		Mid Downs Radio	
1359	(Spain) Arganda del Rey	10			Digital Radio Mondiale (DRM)
1359	(Italy) Viterbo	1		Regional Radio	
1368	(Isle of Man) Foxdale	20		Manx Radio Gold	
1368	Greece		Thessaloniki/Chalastra	Radio Dekatria	
1377	(United Kingdom) Ashton Moss	0.08		Lyca Radio Greater Manchester	
1386	(Lithuania) Viešintos	75		Radio Liberty (RUS); Radio Poland (POL / BEL / UKR / GER / ENG / RUS); NHK World Radio Japan (RUS / ENG); Ukrainian Radio First Channel (UKR)	
1386	(Greece) Veria	2		Radio Makedonia	
1386	(United Kingdom) George Eliot Hospital	0.001		Anker Radio	
1386	(United Kingdom) Singleton Hospital	0.002		Radio City Swansea	
1386	(United Kingdom) Clatterbridge Hospital	0.001		Radio Clatterbridge	
1395	(Italy) Roma/Military Airport	1		Regional Radio	
1395	(Italy) Padova	0.2		Viva La Radio!	
1404	(Italy) Dinazzano di Casalgrande	0.2		Radio Banana	
1404	(Romania) Sibiu	15		Radio Romania Actualitati	
1404	(Romania) Sighetu Marmației	50		Radio Romania Sighet / Bukaresti Radio Romania / Radio Rumanien Bukarest	
1404	(Greece) Komotini	50		ERA Komotinis	
1413	(Moldova) Grigoriopol	500		Vesti FM	
1413	(United Kingdom) Dartford Marshes	0.5		Premier Christian Radio	
1413	(United Kingdom) Heathrow	0.5		Premier Christian Radio	
1413	(United Kingdom) Berkley Heath	0.2		BBC Radio Gloucestershire (to cease November 2026)	
1413	(United Kingdom) Bradford	0.01		Bradford Asian Radio	
1422	(Romania) Poenari	14		Radio Romania Actualitati	
1431	(Greece) Thessaloniki	0.008		1431AM	
1431	(United Kingdom) St Richard's Hospital	0.001		Chichester Hospital Radio	
1431	(United Kingdom) East Surrey Hospital	0.001		Radio Redhill	
1440	(Denmark) Ishøj	0.5		Radio208	
1440	(Greece) Rodos	1		Star Radio	
1440	(Italy) Rieti	1		Regional Radio	
1449	(United Kingdom) Peterborough	0.15		BBC Asian Network	
1458	(United Kingdom) Brookmans Park	125	Against ground insulated self-radiating steel lattice mast, height 152.4m; two free-standing steel truss masts with T-aerial, height 60.9m	Lyca Radio Greater London	
1458	(Romania) Agigea	50		Radio Romania Actualitati	
1458	(United Kingdom) Birmingham	5		BBC Asian Network	
1458	(Gibraltar) Maida Vale	2		GBC Radio Gibraltar Plus (AM)	
1467	(France) Roumoules	1000		Trans World Radio	
1467	(Netherlands) Utrecht	0.1		Radio Paradijs	
1476	(Austria) Bad Ischl	0.4		Museumsradio AM	
1485	(Romania) Oradea	1		Radio Vocea Sperantei	
1485	(Italy) Livorno	1		Radio Studio X	AM stereo
1485	(Netherlands) Amsterdam	0.001		AMsterdam 1485	
1485	(Netherlands) Bladel	0.001		B-AM 1485	
1485	(Germany) Erlangen	0.006-0.1		Transmitter Joe with the radio programme of Funklust	
1485	(Spain) Antequera	2		Onda Cero (Málaga)	
1485	(Norway) Longyearbyen	1		NRK P1 / NRK P2	
1485	(Italy) Terni	1		Regional Radio	
1485	(Greece) Volos	1		ERT Volos	
1485	(Italy) Sarego	1		Golden Radio	
1494	(Moldova) Edineţ	20		Radio Moldova	
1494	(Moldova) Cahul	30		Radio Moldova	
1503	(Italy) Trieste	1		Radio Metropolis	
1503	(Portugal) Base Aérea das Lajes	0.1		AFN Island FM	
1512	(Greece) Khania	50		ERT Khanion	
1521	(Spain) Castellon	5		SER	
1521	(United Kingdom) Ryton-on-Dunsmore	0.1		Radio Panj	
1530	(Romania) Tulca-Nufaru	15		Radio Romania Constanța	
1530	(Portugal) Santo António	10		Posto Emissor do Funchal	
1539	(Spain) Elche	6		SER	
1539	(Spain) Manresa	5		SER Radio Manresa	
1548					
1557	(Lithuania) Sitkūnai	50		Radio Lenta	
1557	(United Kingdom) Chandler's Ford	0.001		Outreach Gold	
1566	(Netherlands) The Hague	0.4		Vahon Hindustani Radio	
1566	(United Kingdom) Taunton	1		BBC Radio Somerset (to cease November 2026)	
1566	(United Kingdom) Peasmarsh	0.8		Premier Christian Radio	
1575	(Spain) El Pardo	10		SER Radio Córdoba	
1575	(Italy) Alessandria	1		Centrale Milano	
1575	(United Kingdom) Leicester	0.004		Radio Seerah	
1575	(United Kingdom) Harwich	0.001		Radio Mi Amigo	
1584	(Romania) Timişoara	1		Radio ALT FM	
1584	(Italy) Arezzo	1		Radio Studio X	AM stereo
1584	(Italy) Vicenza	1		Radio Piterpan	
1584	(Romania) Târgu Mureș	1		Radio Popular	
1584	(Greece) Kastro	1		RSA 92,7	
1584	(Romania) Sighetu Marmației	1		Radio Vocea Sperantei	
1584	(Netherlands) Driebergen-Rijsenburg			Fidelio Radio	
1584	(Romania) Iași	1		Radio Vocea Sperantei	
1584	(Russia) Belorechensk	0.03		Chistaya Volna	
1593	(Romania) Miercurea Ciuc	15		Radio Romania Târgu Mureș / Marosvasarhely Radio Romania / Radio Romanien Neumarkt / Bukaresti Radio Romania / Radio Rumanien Bukarest	
1593	(Romania) Ion Corvin	15		Radio Romania Actualitati	
1593	(Romania) Sibiu	10		Radio Romania Antena Sibiului / Bukaresti Radio Romania / Radio Rumanien Bukarest	
1593	(Romania) Oradea	15		Radio Romania Cluj / Kolozsvari Radio Romania / Bukaresti Radio Romania / Radio Rumanien Bukarest	
1602	(Spain) Cartagena	5		SER Radio Cartagena	
1602	(Latvia) Riga	1.25		Radio Centrs	
1602	(Greece) Samos	1		ERA Net	
1602	(Finland) Virrat	0.4	Quarter wave vertical	Scandinavian Weekend Radio	

== Former stations ==
Frequency (kHz)	Transmitter site	Power (kW)	Transmission aerial	Programme	Mode of transmission
531	(Switzerland) Beromünster	180	Free standing lattice tower, height 217m, insulated against ground	SRF Musikwelle	
531	(Spain) Pontevedra	25		RNE Radio 5	
531	(Spain) Oviedo	20		RNE Radio 5 (Asturias)	
531	(Spain) Pamplona	10		RNE Radio 5 (Navarra)	
531	(Russia) Cheboksary	30	Radiocenter RV-74	Mayak / GTRK Chuvashiya	
531	(Spain) Córdoba	10		RNE Radio 5	
531	(Germany) Burg	2	Triangle area antenna	Truckradio	
531	(Poland) Żywiec	0.8		Twoje Radio Żywiec	
531	(Poland) Włodawa	0.8		Twoje Radio Włodawa	
531	(Poland) Katowice	0.8		Radio AM	
540	(Russia) Orenburg	50		Radio Mayak	
540	(France) Bayonne	1		France Inter	
540	(Belgium) Wavre			Radio 2	
549	(Germany) Nordkirchen	100	Two guyed masts of lattice steel, height 99.5m, insulated against ground	Deutschlandfunk	
549	(Russia) Elektrostal	75		Radio Mayak	
549	(Kosovo) Pristina	10		RTK Radio Kosova	
549	(Russia) Kaliningrad			Radio Mayak	
549	(Russia) Saint Petersburg	600		Radio Mayak	
549	(Russia) Syktyvkar	150	Mast height 257m	Radio Mayak	
549	(Germany) Thurnau	100	Guyed lattice steel mast, height 240m, insulated against ground	Deutschlandfunk	
549	(Republic of Ireland) Carrickroe	25		Spirit Radio	
549	(Russia) Noginsk	75		Radio Mayak	
549	(Russia) Novocherkassk	50		Radio Mayak	
549	(Ukraine) Mykolaiv	550	Destroyed by a Russian attack in 2022.	Ukrainske Radio 1 / Krym.Realii	
549	(Ukraine) Vinnitsya	50		Radio Promin	
549	(Ukraine) Brovary	150		Radio Promin	
549	(Ukraine) Mykolaiv	150		Radio Promin	
549	(Ukraine) Lviv	70		Radio Promin	
549	(Ukraine) Mariupol	7		Radio Promin	
549	(Ukraine) Kerch	5		Radio Promin	
549	(Belarus) Lapichi	500		Radio Mayak	
549	(Soviet Union) Moscow			Radio Mayak	
558	(United Kingdom) London	0.3		Spectrum Radio	
558	(Spain) Valencia	50		RNE Radio 5 (Valencia)	
558	(Spain) San Sebastián	50		RNE Radio 5 (Pais Vasco)	
558	(Spain) A Coruña	25		RNE Radio 5 (Galicia)	
558	(Switzerland) Monte Ceneri	200	220m high guyed lattice steel mast, insulated against ground	RSI Rete Uno	
558	(Finland) Helsinki	50		YLE Radio Finland	
558	(Germany) Rostock			Power Radio	
567	(Spain) Marbella	5		RNE Radio 5	
567	(Spain) Las Torres de Cotillas	50		RNE Radio 5 (Murcia)	
567	(Russia) Volgograd	500		Radio Rossii Volgograd	
567	(Republic of Ireland) Tullamore	500	Ceased 24 March 2008	RTÉ Radio 1	
567	(Germany) Stallupöner Allee (Berlin-Charlottenburg)	1.8	Guyed mast of lattice steel, height 130m, insulated against ground	Funkhaus Europa	
567	(Italy) Bologna			Rai Radio 1	
576	(Italy) Caltanissetta	20		Rai Radio 1	
576	(Spain) Mesas de Galaz	25		Radio Nacional (Canarias)	
576	(Spain) Palau-solità i Plegamans	100		RNE Radio 5 (Cataluna)	
576	(Russia) Astrakhan	50	Radiocenter RC-1	Radio Mayak	
576	(Russia) Nalchik	25		Radio Rossii Nalchik	
576	(Germany) Mühlacker	100	Guyed steel tube mast, height 273m, insulated against ground, double feedable. Backup antenna: guyed steel tube mast, height 130m, insulated against ground further: guyed lattice steel mast, height 80m, insulated against ground	SWR cont.ra	
576	(Germany) Wöbbelin (Schwerin)	250	Two guyed lattice steel masts, height 120m, insulated against ground. Directional radiation.	MEGARADIO	
585	(Russia) Perm	150		Radio Rossii Permskiy Kray	
585	(United Kingdom) Dumfries	1.2	Ceased 2020	BBC Radio Scotland	
585	(Austria) Bisamberg	60	Guyed steel framework mast, height 265m, insulated against ground	Ö1	
585	(Austria) Klagenfurt	25		Ö1	
585	(Austria) Salzburg	10		Ö1	
585	(France) Marseille	10		FIP	
585	(France) Romainville-Paris	5		FIP	
585	Vatican City	5		Vatican Radio 1	
585	(Spain) Madrid	100–150, 75 at night	Guyed steel lattice mast, height 264m	Radio Nacional	
585	(Spain) La Soledad	10		Radio Nacional (Andalucia)	
594	(Germany) Hoher Meisner	90	Cage aerial on 155m high, guyed, grounded lattice steel mast, backup antenna: steel tube mast insulated against ground, height 95m	hr-info	
594	(Germany) Weiskirchen	250	Two guyed 126.5m high lattice steel masts, insulated against ground, directional radiation	hr-info	
594	(Russia) Izhevsk	40	Mast height 143m	Radio Rossii Udmurtia	
594	(Russia) Vladikavkaz	25		Vesti FM	
594	(Croatia) Deanovec	10		Voice of Croatia	Digital Radio Mondiale (DRM)
594	(Ukraine) Kyiv	7		BBC	
594	(Slovenia) Cerkno			Radio Odmev	
603	(France) Lyon	300	Guyed, self-radiant steel truss mast, height 220m	France Info	
603	(Germany) Zehlendorf bei Oranienburg	20	Cage antenna on 120m high guyed grounded mast of lattice steel	Voice of Russia	
603	(United Kingdom) Newcastle upon Tyne	0.5	Ceased 15 April 2024	BBC Radio 4	
603	(United Kingdom) Littlebourne	0.1		Smooth Radio	
603	(Spain) Seville	50		RNE Radio 5 (Andalucia)	
603	(Spain) Palencia	5		RNE Radio 5 (CyL)	
612	(Germany) Kiel – Kronshagen (Heischberg)	10		Power 612	
612	(Russia) Pedaselga	150		Radio Mayak	
612	(Russia) Murmansk	30	RC-1	Radio Mayak	
612	(Ukraine) Chaplinka	10		Ukrainian Radio	
612	(Ukraine) Kharkiv	10		BBC	
612	(Ukraine) Kyiv	5		BBC	
612	(Republic of Ireland) Athlone	100	Ceased 12 April 2004	RTÉ 2FM	
612	(Bosnia and Herzegovina) Donje Moštre	300		BH Radio 1	
612	(Lithuania) Vilnius	50		Radio Baltic Waves	
612	(Spain) Vitoria	10		Radio Nacional	
612	(Spain) Lleida	10		Radio Nacional	
621	(Belgium) Wavre	300		RTBF International	
621	(Russia) Syktyvkar	50	Mast height 60m	Radio Rossii Komi gor	
621	(Russia) Makhachkala	50		Radio Rossii Dagestan	
621	(Spain) Parque Las Mesas	100–150, 75 at night		Radio Nacional (Canarias)	
621	(Spain) Palma	10		Radio Nacional (Baleares)	
621	(Spain) Jaén	10		Radio Nacional	
621	(Spain) Avilla	10		Radio Nacional	
630	(Germany) Königslutter / Cremlingen	18-100	Guyed mast of lattice steel, insulated against ground, height 137m	Voice of Russia	
630	(Russia) Saratov	30		Radio Mayak	
630	(United Kingdom) Redruth	2	Ceased 2020	BBC Radio Cornwall	
630	(United Kingdom) Luton	0.2	Ceased 2020	BBC Three Counties Radio	
630	(Austria) Lienz	1		Ö2 Radio Niederösterreich	
630	(Norway) Vigra		Guyed, steel-tube mast radiator insulated against the earth, height 232m	NRK P1	
639	(Czech Republic) RKS Liblice 2	750 - 1500	Cage antennas on two guyed mast of lattice steel, height 355m. Ceased 31 December 2021	ČRo Dvojka, broadcast Country Radio at 20kw until 31 March 2025	
639	(Czech Republic) Ostrava	30	Ceased 31 December 2021	ČRo Dvojka	
639	(Spain) A Coruña	100–150, 75 at night		Radio Nacional (Galicia)	
639	(Spain) Zaragoza	50		Radio Nacional (Aragon)	
639	(Spain) Bilbao	50		Radio Nacional (Pais Vasco)	
639	(Spain) Almería	25		Radio Nacional	
639	(Spain) Albacete	12		Radio Nacional	
648	(United Kingdom) Orfordness	500	Five freestanding steel lattice towers of triangular cross section	BBC World Service	
648	(Ukraine) Chonhar	25		Krym.Realii	
648	(Ukraine) Simferopol	150		Ukraine Radio 1 / Radio Krym	
648	(Ukraine) Kharkiv	5		BBC	
648	(Spain) Badajoz	10		Radio Nacional	
657	(Spain) Madrid	100		RNE Radio 5 (Madrid)	
657	(Italy) Pisa	100	Guyed steel lattice mast	Rai Radio 1 Toscana	
657	(Italy) Naples	50		Rai Radio 1	
657	(Italy) Montiggl	25		Rai Radio 1	
657	(Russia) Murmansk	150		Radio Rossii Murman	
657	(Russia) Grozny	50		Chechnya Svobodnaya / Radiokanal Kavkaz	
657	(Ukraine) Chernivtsi	25		Radio Kultura (later First Channel)	
657	(United Kingdom) Wrexham	2	Ceased 2021	BBC Radio Wales	
657	(Germany) Neubrandenburg (Helpterberg)			Power Radio	
666	(Iceland) Höfn	1		RUV Radio 1	
666	(Iceland) Kópavogur	1		Rás 1 / Rás 2	
666	(United Kingdom) Fulford	0.5	Ceased 2020	BBC Radio York	
666	(Russia) Yekaterinburg	10		BBC	
666	(Germany) Bodenseesender Rohrdorf	150	Guyed mast of lattice steel, height 240m, insulated against ground for daytime transmission; three guyed masts of lattice steel, height 137m, insulated against ground for nighttime transmission and as backup antenna	SWR cont.ra	
666	(Lithuania) Sitkūnai			Lietuvos radijas	
675	(France) Marseille	600		France Inter	
675	(France) Marseille	100	Guyed lattice steel mast, height 121m	Superloustic	
675	(Netherlands) Lopik	50	Guyed lattice steel mast, height 196m, insulated against ground	Radio Maria	
675	(Ukraine) Korytnyany	50		Ukrainske radio	
675	(Norway) Røst			NRK P1	
684	(Spain) Seville	100–150, 75 at night		Radio Nacional (Andalucia)	
693	(Germany) Zehlendorf bei Oranienburg	250	Cage aerial on guyed grounded lattice steel mast with a height of 120m	Voice of Russia	
693	(Russia) Yazykovo	150		Radio Rossii Bashkortostan	
693	(Italy) Milano (Siziano)	30	Guyed steel lattice mast, height 145m	Rai Radio 2 – Lombardia	DRM
693	(Russia) Moscow	10		DW	
693	(Russia) Astrakhan	0.2		NTS	
693	(United Kingdom) Bexhill-on-Sea	0.4		BBC Radio 5 Live	
693	(United Kingdom) Folkestone	0.4		BBC Radio 5 Live	
693	(United Kingdom) Southwick, West Sussex	0.6		BBC Radio 5 Live	
702	(France) Col de la Madone	400		Radio China International	
702	(Germany) Flensburg	7.5	Cage aerial on grounded mast of lattice steel	NDR Info	
702	(Germany) Jülich	5		Truckradio	
702	Andorra-la-Vella	300		Radio Andorra	
702	(Slovakia) Čižatice	5		RTVS Rádio Devín / RTVS Rádio Patria (Pátria Rádió)	
711	(France) Rennes	300	Guyed steel framework mast, height 220m, insulated against ground	France Info	
711	(Ukraine) Dokuchaevsk	40		Ukrainian Radio Donetsk / Vesti FM	
711	(Russia) Naryan-Mar	7		Radio Rossii Zapolarye	
711	(Germany) Heidelberg–Dossenheim	5	Guyed steel tube mast, insulated against ground, height 51m	SWR cont.ra	
711	(Germany) Heilbronn-Obereisesheim	5	Guyed lattice steel mast, insulated against ground, height 74m	SWR cont.ra	
711	(Germany) Ulm	5	Guyed lattice steel mast, insulated against ground	SWR cont.ra	
711	(Germany) Bad Mergentheim	3	Long-wire antenna on tower of reinforced concrete, dismantled	SWR cont.ra	
711	(France) Lyon	1		FIP	
711	(Soviet Union)			Vsesoyuznoye Radio (1st Programme)	
720	(Germany) Langenberg-Rommel	65	Cage aerial on grounded guyed mast of lattice steel, height 170m. Two separate feedlines to achieve night-time directional attenuation	WDR 2 / WDR VERA	
720	(Spain) Parque Las Mesas	25		RNE Radio 5 (Tenerife)	
720	(United Kingdom) London	0.75	Ceased 2001	BBC Radio 4	
720	(United Kingdom) Lisnagarvey	10	Ceased 15 April 2024	BBC Radio 4	
720	(United Kingdom) Crystal Palace	0.24	Ceased 15 April 2024	BBC Radio 4	
720	(United Kingdom) Londonderry	0.25	Ceased 15 April 2024	BBC Radio 4	
729	(Germany) Hof	0.2	Guyed grounded mast of lattice steel, fed by guys, height 74m	Bayern Plus	
729	(Germany) Würzburg	1	Guyed mast of lattice steel, insulated against ground	Bayern Plus	
729	(Finland) Tampere	0.08		Pispalan Radio	
729	(Russia) Samara	50		Radio Zvezda	
729	(Republic of Ireland) Cork	10	Ceased 2008	RTE Radio 1	
729	(Germany) Putbus	1	Guyed mast of lattice steel, height 51m, insulated against ground	Deutschlandfunk	DRM
729	(United Kingdom) Manningtree	0.2	Ceased 2021	BBC Essex	
729	(Spain) Oviedo	100		Radio Nacional (Asturias)	
729	(Spain) Campanillas	25		Radio Nacional (Andalucia)	
729	(Spain) Valladolid	20		Radio Nacional (CyL)	
729	(Spain) Alicante	10		Radio Nacional (Valencia)	
738	(Russia) Chelyabinsk	40	Radiocenter RV-72	Radio Rossii Yuzhniy Ural	
738	(Russia) Moscow	5		World Radio Network	
738	(Germany) Stuttgart / Hirschlanden	5	Guyed mast of lattice steel, insulated against ground, height 40m	Megaradio	
738	(France) Romainville	5		RFI	
738	(Iceland) Skjaldarvík	5		RUV Radio 1	
738	(Spain) Palau-solità i Plegamans	100–150, 75 at night	Self radiant guyed lattice steel mast, height 217m	Radio Nacional (Catalunya)	
747	(Netherlands) Flevoland	60-400	Cage antenna on grounded guyed 195m high mast of lattice steel, double feedable	NPO Radio 5 Nostalgia	
747	(Spain) Cádiz	10		RNE Radio 5	
747	(Spain) Mesas de Galaz	20		RNE Radio 5 (Las Palmas)	
747	(Bulgaria) Salamanovo	10		BNR Horizont / BNR Türkçe Yayınlar	
747	(Russia) Saint Petersburg			Radio Baltika / Otkrytiy Gorod / Golos Nadezhdy	
756	(Germany) Braunschweig / Cremlingen	200	Guyed steel tube mast, height 189m, insulated against ground, guyed mast of lattice steel, height 99m, insulated against ground. directional radiation, backup antenna: guyed lattice steel mast, height 137m, insulated against ground	Deutschlandfunk	
756	(Germany) Ravensburg	100	2 guyed masts of lattice steel, height 120m, insulated against ground, directional radiation	Deutschlandfunk	
756	(Russia) Ufa	10		Titan	
756	(United Kingdom) Redruth	2	Ceased 15 April 2024	BBC Radio 4	
756	(United Kingdom) Powys	0.63	Ceased 2015	Radio Hafren	
765	(Switzerland) Sottens	170	Cage antenna on grounded lattice tower, height 190m. Ceased 5 December 2010	RTS Option Musique	
765	(United Kingdom) Chelmsford	0.5	Ceased 2021	BBC Essex	
765	(Russia) Pedaselga	150	Guyed steel mast, height 204m	Radio Rossii Karelia	
765	(Ukraine) Petrivka	40		Radio Akademiya – Radio Mayak	
774	(Germany) Bonn-Venusberg	5	Guyed steel tube mast, height 180m, insulated against ground	WDR 2	
774	(Bosnia and Herzegovina) Tuzla	2.5		Radio Tuzla / Radio Free Europe	
774	(Austria) Salzburg	1		Ö2 Radio Salzburg	
774	(Russia) Somovo	30		Radio Mayak / GTRK Voronezh	
774	(Bulgaria) Vakarel	10	Two-Antenna Array	BNR – Znanie / Parliamentary Channel	
774	(United Kingdom) Littlebourne	0.7	Ceased 2018	BBC Radio Kent	
774	(United Kingdom) Enniskillen	0.5	Ceased 15 April 2024	BBC Radio 4	
774	(United Kingdom) Plumer Barracks	0.2	Ceased 15 April 2024	BBC Radio 4	
774	(United Kingdom) Gloucester	0.14	Ceased 28 June 2023	Smooth Radio	
774	(Spain) Valencia	100		Radio Nacional (Valencia)	
774	(Spain) San Sebastián	50		Radio Nacional (Pais Vasco)	
774	(Spain) La Linea de la Concepción	10		Radio Nacional (Andalucia)	
783	(Ukraine) Brovary	150		Radio Promin	
783	(Germany) Leipzig-Wiederau	100	Guyed steel tube mast, height 236m, triangle aera antenna	MDR Info	
792	(France) Limoges	300		France Info	
792	(Russia) Noginsk	150	Test	Radio Mayak	DRM
792	(Russia) Astrakhan	50	Radiocenter RC-1	Radio Rossii / GTRK Lotos	
792	(Germany) Lingen	5	Long wire antenna on grounded steel tube mast	NDR Info	
792	(Bosnia and Herzegovina) Banovići	2		Radio Banovići	
792	(United Kingdom) Kempston	0.275	Ceased 2 November 2020	Smooth Radio	
801	(Germany) München-Ismaning	100	Guyed steel tube mast, height 171.5m, insulated against ground, multiple feedable. Spare antenna: guyed mast of lattice steel, height 105m, insulated against ground	Bayern Plus	
801	(Russia) Saint Petersburg	150		Narodnoe Radio	
801	(Soviet Union) Leningrad	1000	Transmission timeline from 1980 to 1991	Radio Leningrad	
801	(Germany) Nürnberg-Dillberg	17	Cage antenna on grounded 231m high mast of lattice steel	Bayern Plus	
801	(Spain) As Arierias	25		Radio Nacional (Galicia)	
810	(Russia) Moscow	20		Voice of America	
810	(Russia) Volgograd	500		Radio Mayak	
810	(Russia) Yekaterinburg	25		Radio Mayak	
810	(Ukraine) Tokmak	25		Radio Promin	
810	(Ukraine) Lutsk	20		Lutska OGTRK	
810	(Ukraine) Hirnyk	10		Armiya FM	
810	(Ukraine) Taranivka	7		Ukrainian Radio 3	
810	(Germany) Stallupöner Allee (Berlin-Charlottenburg)	10	Guyed mast of lattice steel, height 130m, insulated against ground	Sender Freies Berlin	
810	(Spain) Madrid	50		RNE Radio Madrid	
810	(North Macedonia) Ovče Pole	100	Free-standing steel lattice tower	Makedonsko Radio 1	
819	(Andorra) Pic Blanc	900		Sud Radio	
819	(France) Toulouse	20		Sud Radio	
819	(Germany) Regensburg	5	Long wire antenna on tower of reinforced concrete	Mega Radio	
828	(Bulgaria) Kardjali	50		BNR Horizont / BNR Türkçe Yayınlar	
828	(Bulgaria) Stolnik near Sofia	50	Antenna Array	BNR 2 – Hristo Botev	
828	(Bulgaria) Shumen	50		BNR 2 – Hristo Botev	
828	(Germany) Hanover / Hemmingen	5-20	Guyed lattice steel mast, height 118m, insulated against ground, long wire antenna on grounded 125m high lattice steel mast	NDR Info	
828	(Russia) Nizhny Novgorod	50		Radio Rossii Nizhniy Novgorod	
828	(Russia) Saint Petersburg	10		Radiogazeta Slovo / Pravoslavnoye Radio	
828	(Germany) Freiburg	10	Guyed lattice steel mast, insulated against ground	SWR 4 Radio Breisgau	
828	(United Kingdom) Morley	0.12	Ceased 2021	Greatest Hits Radio (Yorkshire)	
828	(United Kingdom) Fern Barrow	0.27	Ceased June 2023	Smooth Radio	
828	(United Kingdom) Lewsey Farm	0.2	Ceased 2 November 2020	Smooth Radio	
828	(Netherlands) Eindhoven	0.1		euRegio Radio / Radio 4 Brainport	
837	(France) Nancy	200		France Info	
837	(Ukraine) Taranivka	150		Ukrainian Radio 1	
837	(Ukraine) Chernivtsi	30		Radio Bukovina	
846	(Italy) Santa Palomba	25	Cage antenna on 186m tall grounded free-standing lattice steel tower	Rai Radio 2	
846	(Russia) Elista	40		Radio Rossii Kalmykiya	
846	(Russia) Noginsk	150	Mast height 170m	RTV-Podmoskovye	
846	(Russia) Perm	5		Radio Yunost	
846	(United Kingdom) Southwick Hospital	0.001		Seaside Hospital Radio	
846	(Soviet Union) Moscow			Moscow Region Radio	
855	(Russia) Kamenka	50		Radio Rossii Penza	
855	(Germany) Berlin-Britz	25	Guyed mast of lattice steel, height 144m, insulated against ground	Deutschlandradio Kultur	DRM, AM for special transmissions
855	(United Kingdom) Norwich	1	Ceased 2020	BBC Radio Norfolk	
855	(United Kingdom) Greete	0.15		Sunshine Radio (Ludlow)	
855	(Spain) Las Torres de Cotillas	100–150, 75 at night		Radio Nacional (Murcia)	
855	(Spain) Tarragona	25		Radio Nacional (Cataluna)	
855	(Spain) Huelva	10		Radio Nacional (Andalucia)	
864	(France) Villebon-sur-Yvette	300	Two self-radiating guyed steel lattice masts with triangular cross-section	France Bleu Paris	AM stereo
864	(Bulgaria) Samuil	10		BNR Horizont / BNR Türkçe Yayınlar	
873	(Germany) Oberursel, Frankfurt	150	3 guyed masts of lattice steel, insulated against ground, directional radiation	AFN Power Network	
873	(Russia) Kurovskaya	150		Radio Rossii	
873	(Russia) Kaliningrad			Radio Rossii	
873	(Russia) Samara	100		Radio Rossii Samara	
873	(Belarus) Kolodishchi	150		Radio 2	
873	(Russia) Saint Petersburg	75		Radio Rossii	
873	(Ukraine) Brovary	50		Svoboda / Voice of America / UHRT	
873	(Ukraine) Chasiv Yar	25		Ukrainian Radio First Channel	
873	(Ukraine) Vinnitsya	7		Radio Khvilya	
873	(Ukraine) Zarvantsi	7		Radio Khvilya	
873	(Ukraine) Dnipro	7		Oblastnoe Radio 2	
873	(Russia) Belgorod	7		Radio Yunost	
873	(Ukraine) Dnipro	2.5		Ukrainian Radio Dnipropetrovsk	
873	(Ukraine) Simferopol	1		Radio Liberty / Voice of America	
873	(Soviet Union) Moscow			Vsesoyuznoye Radio (3rd Programme)	
882	(Germany) Wachenbrunn / Thüringen	20	Two guyed steel tube masts, height 146.5m, insulated against ground	MDR info	
882	(United Kingdom) Penmon	10		BBC Radio Wales	
882	(United Kingdom) Tywyn	5		BBC Radio Wales	
882	(United Kingdom) Forden	0.8		BBC Radio Wales	
882	(Russia) Stavropol	8		Radio Mayak / SGTRK	
882	(Montenegro) Gornja Plavnica	5		Radio Crne Gore 1	
891	(Germany) Berlin-Köpenick	5	Triangle aerea antenna, dismantled	Radio Berlin-Brandenburg 1	
891	(Netherlands) Hulsberg	20	Guyed steel lattice mast, height 101m	Radio 538	
891	(Russia) Pedaselga	20		Radio Yunost	
891	(Ukraine) Korytnyany	80		Zakarpatska OGTRK	
900	(Russia) Sovetskiy near Yoshkar-Ola	20	RV-23	Mayak / GTRK Mariy El	
900	(Italy) Milano (Siziano)	100	Guyed steel lattice mast, height 148m	Rai Radio 1 – Lombardia	AM
909	(Germany) Dillberg	0.1	Two earthed tubular steel masts, height 231 and 195m	bit eXpress	DRM
909	(Spain) Palma	10		RNE Radio 5 (Baleares)	
909	(Russia) Yekaterinburg	10		Gorod FM	
909	(United Kingdom) Redruth	0.4		BBC Radio 5 Live	
909	(United Kingdom) Exeter	0.2		BBC Radio 5 Live	
918	(Russia) Koskovo	150		Radio Rossii Pomorye	
918	(Slovenia) Domžale	100-300	Guyed steel tube mast, insulated against ground, height 161m. Ceased in 2017	Radio Slovenija 1	
918	(Russia) Moscow	75		Svobodnaya Rossiya	
918	(Russia) Makhachkala	50		Mayak / GTRK Dagestan	
927	(Belgium) Wolvertem			Radio 1	
936	(Germany) Bremen	50	Cage antenna on grounded, 45m high guyed mast of lattice steel	Radio Bremen 1	
936	(Spain) Cuarte Torrero	25		RNE Radio 5 (Aragon)	
936	(Spain) Valladolid	20		RNE Radio 5 (CyL)	
936	(Spain) El Baracot	10		RNE Radio 5 (Valencia)	
936	(Italy) Venezia Campalto	5	Steel lattice tower, demolished in 2019 for security reasons	Rai Radio 1 – Veneto	
936	(Ukraine) Lviv	600		Ukrainian Radio / Golos Rossii	
945	(France) Toulouse	300		France Info	
945	(Russia) Novocherkassk	40		Radio Rossii Rostov	
945	(United Kingdom) Quarndon	0.2	Ceased 2023	Gold	
945	(United Kingdom) Bexhill	0.7		Smooth Radio	
945	(United Kingdom) Rookwood Hospital	0.001		Rookwood Sound	
945	(Germany) München	5	Long wire antenna on tower of reinforced concrete	Megaradio	
945	(Russia) Moscow				
954	(Czech Republic) Dobrochov	200	Free-standing steel lattice tower, height 152m. Ceased 31 December 2021	ČRo Dvojka	
954	(Czech Republic) České Budějovice	30	Ceased 31 December 2021	ČRo Dvojka	
954	(Czech Republic) Karlovy Vary	20	Ceased 31 December 2021	ČRo Dvojka	
954	(Czech Republic) České Budějovice	3		ČRo Radiožurnál	DRM
963	(Finland) Pori	600		YLE Radio Finland from 1987 to the end of 2006. Last contracts with China Radio International (expired on 15 April 2013)	
963	(Bulgaria) Kardjali	50		BNR Horizont / BNR Türkçe Yayınlar	
963	(Bulgaria) Dragoman near Sofia	50	Single mast	BNR Horizont	
963	(Russia) Moscow	5		Teos / Radiotserkov	
963	(Poland) Brzesko	0.5		Radio AM	
963	(Poland) Lubaczów	0.8		Radio AM	
963	(Poland) Lubliniec	0.8		Radio AM Lubliniec	
963	(Poland) Radomsko	0.8		Radio AM Radomsko	
972	(Germany) Hamburg-Billstedt	100	Guyed steel tube mast, height 184m, insulated against ground, double feedable Spare antenna: guyed steel tube mast, height 120.9m, insulated against ground	NDR Info	
972	(Ukraine) Mykolaiv	40		Ukrainian Radio 1	
981	(Czech Republic) Moravské Budějovice	5		Rádio Český Impuls	
981	(Italy) Trieste	10		Rai Radio Trst A	
990	(Germany) Berlin-Britz	100	Guyed mast of lattice steel, height 160m, insulated against ground	Deutschlandradio Kultur	
990	(Cyprus) Cape Greco	600		Radio Sawa	
990	(Russia) Moscow	15		Radio Zvezda	
990	(United Kingdom) Redmoss	1	Ceased 2015	BBC Radio nan Gaidheal	
990	(United Kingdom) Doncaster	0.25		Greatest Hits Radio (Yorkshire)	
990	(United Kingdom) Wolverhampton	0.09	Ceased 2020	Absolute Classic Rock	
999	(United Kingdom) Lancashire	0.8	Ceased 2021	Greatest Hits Radio (Manchester)	
999	(United Kingdom) Nottingham	0.25	Ceased 2023	Gold	
999	(Italy) Torino Volpiano	50		Rai Radio 1 / Rai Piemonte	
999	(Germany) Wöbbelin (Schwerin)		Triangle area antenna, dismantled	Talk Radio	
1000	(Russia) Kraj Viłłskij	0.2	Guyed steel lattice mast, height 60m	Villskaya studia Gramzapisi	
1008	(Belarus) Slonim	50		Kanal Kultura	
1008	(Belarus) Smetanichi	40		Kanal Kultura	
1008	(Belarus) Yasny Les	25		Kanal Kultura	
1008	(Belarus) Grodno	7		Kanal Kultura	
1008	(Netherlands) Flevoland	200	Cage antenna on guyed grounded mast of lattice steel, height 195m, double feedable	Groot Nieuws Radio	
1017	(Germany) Rheinsender (Wolfsheim)	100	Guyed steel tube mast, height 160m, insulated against ground double feedable	SWR cont.ra	
1017	(Russia) Moscow	125		Radio Rezonans	
1017	(United Kingdom) Shrewsbury	0.63	Ceased 2020	Absolute Classic Rock	
1017	(Germany) Greifswald			Megaradio	
1026	(Austria) Dobl	100		Radio Steiermark / Ö1	
1026	(Belarus) Myadel	25		Kanal Kultura	
1026	(Austria) Liezen	10		Ö1	
1026	(Austria) Lauterach	10		Ö1	
1026	(Belarus) Palykavicy	50		Kanal Kultura	
1026	(Russia) Arkhangelsk	5		Radio Mayak	
1026	(Belarus) Pinsk	7		Kanal Kultura	
1026	(Belarus) Brest	7		Kanal Kultura	
1026	(Belarus) Soligorsk	5		Kanal Kultura	
1026	(United Kingdom) Belfast	1.7		Downtown Radio	
1026	(United Kingdom) Chesterton Fen	0.5	Ceased 2021	BBC Radio Cambridgeshire	
1026	(Jersey) Trinity	1		BBC Radio Jersey	
1035	(United Kingdom) Aberdeen	0.78	Ceased 2018	Northsound 2	
1035	(United Kingdom) Symington, South Ayrshire	0.32		Greatest Hits Radio (Scotland)	
1035	(United Kingdom) Kent	0.5		BBC Radio Kent	
1035	(United Kingdom) Sheffield	1	Ceased 2021	BBC Radio Sheffield	
1044	(Germany) Wilsdruff	20	Guyed steel tube mast, height 153m, insulated against ground	MDR Info	
1044	(Russia) Moscow	20		Radio Svoboda	
1044	(Ukraine) Gora Synycya	1		Ukrainian Radio 1	
1053	(Russia) Orenburg	10		Radio Rossii Orenburg	
1053	(United Kingdom) Dundee	1	Ceased 2023	Talksport	
1053	(United Kingdom) Hull	1	Ceased 2023	Talksport	
1053	(United Kingdom) Kent	4		Talksport	
1053	(United Kingdom) Southwick, West Sussex	2.2		Talksport	
1053	(United Kingdom) Stockton-on-Tees	1		Talksport	
1062	(Denmark) Kalundborg	300	Guyed mast of lattice steel, insulated against ground, height 147m	DR P1	
1062	(Italy) Cagliari Decimoputzu	60		Rai Radio 1 – Sardegna	
1062	(Italy) Ancona	6		Rai Radio 1	
1062	(Italy) Catania	20		Rai Radio 1 Sicilia	
1062	(Russia) Saransk	20		Radio Rossii Mordovia	
1062	(Poland) Skarzysko	0.8		Radio AM	
1062	(Poland) Puławy	0.8		Radio AM	
1062	(Poland) Jarosław	0.5		Radio AM	
1062	(Poland) Cmolas	0.8		Radio AM Cmolas	
1071	(Ukraine) Dnipro	50		Dnipropetrovska OGTRK	
1071	(France) Lille-Camphin	40		France Inter	
1071	(Ukraine) Chernivtsi	30		Radio Bukovina	
1071	(France) Brest	20		France Inter	
1071	(France) Brest	20		France Inter	DRM
1071	(France) Grenoble	20		France Inter	
1071	(France) Bastia	20		France Inter	
1071	(France) Montpellier	10		France Inter	
1071	(Russia) Moscow	10		RIA-Radio	
1071	(Czech Republic) Ostrava	5	Ceased 31 December 2021	ČRo Plus	
1071	(United Kingdom) Clipstone	1		Talksport	
1080	(Poland) Katowice	1500		Radio Polonia	
1080	(Russia) Kovylkino	100		Radio Rossii Mordovia	
1080	(Russia) Murmansk	30		Yunost / Parallel 69	
1089	(Russia) Tbilisskaya	1200		Vesti FM	
1089	(Russia) Krasnodar			Radio Sputnik	
1089	(Russia) Saint Petersburg	50		Radio Teos	
1089	(United Kingdom) Belfast	12.5		Talksport	
1098	(Russia) Vologda	7	Radiocenter RV-523	Radio Rossii Vologda	
1098	(Slovakia) Nitra	25		RTVS Radio Patria (Pátria Rádió) / RTVS Radio Devin	
1098	(Russia) Moscow	10		Radio Vatanym	
1098	(Spain) As Arierias	25		RNE Radio 5 (Galicia)	
1098	(Spain) Huelva	10		RNE Radio 5 (Andalucia)	
1107	(Serbia) Belgrade	60		RTS Radio 1 Beograd	
1107	(Russia) Samara	50-100		Narodnoe Radio / Radio Rossii	
1107	(Russia) Arkhangelsk	50		Radio Yunost	
1107	(Russia) Nalchik	25		Radio Rossii Nalchik	
1107	(Germany) Grafenwöhr	10	Guyed insulated mast of lattice steel	AFN Power Network	
1107	(Germany) Kaiserslautern	10	Guyed insulated mast of lattice steel	AFN Power Network	
1107	(Germany) Vilseck	10		AFN Bavaria	
1107	(Italy) Monte Ciocci (Rome)	10	Guyed steel tubular mast, earthed	Rai Radio 1 / Rai Lazio	
1107	(United Kingdom) Tarbat	1.5		Greatest Hits Radio (Scotland)	
1107	(United Kingdom) Lydd	2		Talksport	
1107	(United Kingdom) Surrey	1		Talksport	
1116	(Germany) Geyer (Chemnitz)	5	Long wire antenna on concrete tower	Megaradio	
1116	(Italy) Palermo	10		Rai Radio 1 Sicilia	
1116	(Russia) Perm	10		Avtoradio Perm	
1116	(Russia) Moscow	5		CRTN	
1116	(Russia) Bolshakovo			Radio Rossii Kaliningrad	
1116	(Soviet Union) Moscow			Moscow City Radio	
1116	(Guernsey) Rohais	0.5		BBC Radio Guernsey	
1125	(Russia) Saint Petersburg	150		Radio Orfey	
1125	(Belgium) Houdeng	20		VivaCité	
1125	(Belarus) Kolodishchi	75		Kanal Kultura	
1125	(United Kingdom) Llandrindod Wells	1		BBC Radio Wales	
1134	(Croatia) Nin	150		Voice of Croatia	
1134	(Russia) Kovylkino	30		Radio Mayak	
1134	(Russia) Moscow	20		Radio Teos	
1134	(Russia) Velikie Luki	7		Yunost / Radio-1	
1134	(Ukraine) Kyiv	10		Ukraine Radio 1	
1134	(Ukraine) Lugansk	5		Ukrainian radio 1	
1134	(United Kingdom) Belfast	0.001	Ceased 2010	Queen's Radio	
1134	(United Kingdom) Bristol	0.001	Ceased 2013	Burst Radio	
1134	(United Kingdom) Luton	0.001		Luton and Dunstable Hospital Radio	
1143	(Russia) Samara	100		Radio Mayak	
1143	(Russia) Murmansk	75		Radio Mayak	
1143	(Russia) Bolshakovo	150		Golos Rossii	
1143	(Germany) Mönchengladbach	1		AFN Power Network	
1143	(Germany) Wertheim	0.3		AFN Power Network	
1143	(Germany) Bad Kissingen	0.3		AFN Power Network	
1143	(Germany) Würzburg	0.3		AFN Power Network	
1143	(Germany) Heidelberg	1	Steel tube mast, insulated against ground	AFN Power Network	
1143	(Germany) Bamberg	0.3	Guyed steel framework mast, insulated against ground	AFN Power Network	
1143	(Germany) Wildflecken	0.3	Steel tube mast, insulated against ground	AFN Power Network	
1143	(Germany) Karlsruhe	1	Steel tube mast, insulated against ground	AFN Power Network	
1143	(Germany) Schweinfurt	0.3	Guyed steel framework masts with T-Antenna	AFN Power Network	
1143	(Germany) Stuttgart / Hirschlanden	10	Guyed steel framework mast, insulated against ground, height 40m	AFN Power Network	
1143	(Germany) Bitburg	1		AFN Power Network	
1152	(United Kingdom) Birmingham	3	Ceased 2020	Absolute Classic Rock	
1152	(United Kingdom) Ashton Moss	1.5	Ceased 2021	Greatest Hits Radio (Manchester)	
1152	(United Kingdom) Dechmont Hill	3.6		Greatest Hits Radio (Scotland)	
1152	(United Kingdom) Greenside	1.8		Greatest Hits Radio (North East)	
1152	(United Kingdom) London	23.5		LBC News	
1152	(United Kingdom) Brundall	0.83	Ceased 28 June 2023	Smooth Radio	
1152	(United Kingdom) Plumer Barracks	0.32	Ceased 29 June 2023	Smooth Radio	
1152	(Russia) Moscow			Radio Orfey	
1152	(Spain) Málaga	25		RNE Radio 5 (Andalucia)	
1152	(Spain) Cartagena	10		RNE Radio 5 (Murcia)	
1161	(France) Sélestat-Strasbourg	200		France Inter	
1161	(France) Toulouse	100		France Inter	
1161	(Russia) Volgograd	75		Radio Orfey	
1161	(France) Ajaccio	20		France Inter	
1161	(Bulgaria) Dulovo	10		BNR Horizont / BNR Türkçe Yayınlar	
1161	(Bulgaria) Targovishte	10		BNR Horizont / BNR Türkçe Yayınlar	
1161	(Bulgaria) Vakarel	50	Three-Antenna Array	BNR Horizont	
1161	(United Kingdom) Kempston	0.1	Ceased 2020	BBC Three Counties Radio	
1161	(United Kingdom) Dundee	1.4		Greatest Hits Radio (Scotland)	
1161	(United Kingdom) Goxhill	0.35	Ceased 2021	Magic Radio	
1170	(Belarus) Sasnovy	700		Radio Belarus	
1170	(Russia) Tbilisskaya	1200		Golos Rossii	
1170	(Russia) Arkhangelsk			Radio-1	
1170	(United Kingdom) Winsh Wen	0.58	Ceased 2022	Greatest Hits Radio (Wales)	
1170	(United Kingdom) Foxhall Heath	0.28	Ceased 27 June 2023	Smooth Radio	
1170	(United Kingdom) Portsmouth	0.12		Smooth Radio	
1179	(Sweden) Sölvesborg	600	2 cage aerials on two free-standing grounded 135m high lattice towers	Radio Sweden	
1179	(Germany) Heusweiler	10	Against ground insulated steel truss mast, height 50m	Antenne Saar	
1188	(Germany) Reichenbach	3	Cage aerial on grounded, guyed steel framework mast	MDR info	
1188	(Russia) Saint Petersburg	10		DW / RFI	
1188	(Russia) Samara	5		Radio XXI vek	
1188	(Belgium) Kuurne			Radio 2	
1194				VoA in Czech language	
1197	(United Kingdom) Southwick, West Sussex	1.1	Ceased 2023	Absolute Radio	
1197	(United Kingdom) Nottingham	0.5	Ceased 2023	Absolute Radio	
1197	(United Kingdom) Gloucester	0.3	Ceased 2023	Absolute Radio	
1197	(United Kingdom) Bournemouth	0.25	Ceased 2023	Absolute Radio	
1197	(United Kingdom) Oxford	0.25	Ceased 2023	Absolute Radio	
1197	(United Kingdom) Hoo St Werburgh	2	Ceased 2018	Absolute Radio	
1197	(United Kingdom) Torbay	1	Ceased 2018	Absolute Radio	
1197	(United Kingdom) Wallasey	0.4	Ceased 2018	Absolute Radio	
1197	(United Kingdom) Cambridge	0.2	Ceased 2018	Absolute Radio	
1197	(Belarus) Kolodishchi	50		Radio Krynitsa	
1197	(Germany) Ismaning	150-300	Four 120m high guyed steel framework masts insulated against ground, switchable directional diagram	VoA / RFE / RL	
1197	(Belarus) Vitebsk	40		Kanal Kultura	
1197	(Belarus) Baranovichi	10		Kanal Kultura	
1197	(Russia) Balakovo	5		Radio Rossii Saratov	
1197	(Russia) Balashov	5		Radio Rossii	
1206	(France) Bordeaux	300		France Info	
1206	(Russia) Moscow	10		Echo Moskvy	
1206	(Russia) Nazran	1		GTRK Ingushetiya	
1215	(United Kingdom) Moorside Edge	100	Ceased 2023	Absolute Radio	
1215	(United Kingdom) Brookmans Park	63	Earthed self-radiating guyed steel lattice mast, height 152.4m; two free-standing guyed steel lattice masts with T-aerial, height 60.9m. Ceased 2023	Absolute Radio	
1215	(United Kingdom) Droitwich	52	Two self-radiating guyed steel lattice masts. Ceased 2023	Absolute Radio	
1215	(United Kingdom) Washford	50	Ceased 2023	Absolute Radio	
1215	(United Kingdom) Westerglen	50	Against ground insulated guyed steel truss mast. Ceased 2023	Absolute Radio	
1215	(United Kingdom) Lisnagarvey	16	Ceased 2023	Absolute Radio	
1215	(United Kingdom) Wrekenton	2.2	Ceased 2023	Absolute Radio	
1215	(United Kingdom) Norwich	1.2	Ceased 2023	Absolute Radio	
1215	(United Kingdom) Fareham	1	Ceased 2023	Absolute Radio	
1215	(United Kingdom) Dartford Crossing	0.004	Ceased 2023	Absolute Radio	
1215	(United Kingdom) Redmoss	2.3	Ceased 2018	Absolute Radio	
1215	(United Kingdom) Redruth	2	Ceased 2018	Absolute Radio	
1215	(United Kingdom) Plumer Barracks	1.1	Ceased 2018	Absolute Radio	
1215	(United Kingdom) Hull	0.32	Ceased 2018	Absolute Radio	
1215	(Russia) Kaliningrad (Bolshakovo)	1200		Vesti FM	
1224	(Ukraine) Odesa	30		Radio Promin	
1224	(Russia) Volgograd			Novaya Volna	
1224	(Russia) Elista	30		Radio Ura!	
1224	(Spain) Albacete	5		COPE	
1224	(Bulgaria) Vidin	50		BNR International Service	
1233	(United Kingdom) Kings Heath, Northampton	0.5	Guyed steel framework mast insulated against ground. Ceased 2023	Absolute Radio	
1233	(United Kingdom) Manningtree	0.5	Ceased 2023	Absolute Radio	
1233	(United Kingdom) Sheffield	0.3	Ceased 2018	Absolute Radio	
1233	(United Kingdom) Swindon	0.1	Ceased 2018	Absolute Radio	
1233	(United Kingdom) Reading	0.16	Ceased 2015	Absolute Radio	
1233	(Cyprus) Cape Greco	600		Monte Carlo Doualiya / Trans World Radio	
1233	(Russia) Shelkovo	150		Narodnoe Radio	
1233	(Czech Republic) Libeznice	10		Radio Dechovka	
1233	(Czech Republic) Dobrochov	5		Radio Dechovka	
1233	(Czech Republic) Ostrava	2		Radio Dechovka	
1233	(Czech Republic) Brno	0.5		Radio Dechovka	
1233	(Czech Republic) České Budějovice	2		Radio Dechovka	
1233	(Belgium) Rocourt			Pure FM	
1242	(France) Marseille	150		France Info	
1242	(Ukraine) Dokuchaevsk	50		Radio Promin	
1242	(Ukraine) Oktyabrskoye	50		Radio Kultura	
1242	(Ukraine) Kyiv			Radio Promin	
1242	(Ukraine) Starobelsk	7		Radio Promin	
1242	(United Kingdom) Boston, Lincolnshire	2	Ceased 2023	Absolute Radio	
1242	(United Kingdom) Stockton	1	Ceased 2023	Absolute Radio	
1242	(United Kingdom) Sideway	0.5	Ceased 2023	Absolute Radio	
1242	(United Kingdom) Dundee	0.5	Ceased 2018	Absolute Radio	
1242	(United Kingdom) Hoo St Werburgh	0.32		Smooth Radio	
1251	(Netherlands) Hulsberg	10	Guyed steel lattice mast, height 101m	NPO Radio 5 Nostalgia	
1251	(Russia) Izhevsk	7		Radio Yunost	
1251	(Russia) Cherkessk	7	RTPS 135m	Radio Rossii Karachaevo-Cherkesiya	
1251	(United Kingdom) Great Barton	0.76	Ceased 27 June 2023	Smooth Radio	
1251	(United Kingdom) Knowsley Community College	0.001	Ceased 2009	KCC Live	
1260	(Ukraine) Taranivka	50		Radio 50 / Radio Svoboda	
1260	(Russia) Saint Petersburg	10		BBC	
1260	(Russia) Kurkino	10		BBC	
1260	(Russia) Yekaterinburg	10		Radio Radonezh	
1260	(United Kingdom) Lydd	1	Ceased 2023	Absolute Radio	
1260	(United Kingdom) Guildford	0.5	Ceased 2018	Absolute Radio	
1260	(United Kingdom) Mangotsfield	1.6	Ceased February 2016	Smooth Radio	
1260	(United Kingdom) Farndon	0.64		Smooth Radio	
1260	Vatican City	5		Vatican Radio 4	
1269	(Germany) Ehdorf, Neumünster	300	2 guyed steel frame work masts, height 65m, insulated against ground	Deutschlandfunk	
1269	(Serbia) Srbobran	5		Radio Novi Sad	
1278	(France) Sélestat	300	Against ground insulated guyed steel truss mast	France Bleu Elsass	
1278	(United Kingdom) Bradford	0.43	Ceased 2023	Greatest Hits Radio (Yorkshire)	
1278	(Ukraine) Petrivka	100		Radio Ukraine International	
1278	(Russia) Dubovka near Volgograd	50		Radio Yunost	
1278	(Russia) Novocherkassk	50		Radio Yunost	
1278	(Russia) Nizhny Novgorod	30		Radio Yunost	
1278	(Russia) Saratov	30		Radio Yunost	
1278	(Belarus) Brest	10		Belarusian Radio	
1278	(Russia) Balashov	5		Radio Yunost	
1278	(Ukraine) Sevastopol	1		Ukrainian Radio 1	
1287	(Russia) Grozny	50		Radio Rossii Vainah	
1287	(Russia) Yazykovo	50		Radio Yunost	
1287	(Russia) Syktyvkar	10	Mast height 60m	Radio Yunost	
1287	(United Kingdom) Basildon	0.001	Ceased 2020	Basildon Hospital Radio	
1287	(United Kingdom) Glencorse Barracks	0.001	Ceased 2020	BFBS Radio	
1287	(United Kingdom) Leicester General Hospital	0.001	Ceased 2019	Radio Gwendolen	
1287	(United Kingdom) University Of Southampton	0.001	Ceased 2012	Surge	
1305	(Russia) Moscow	5		Radio Druzhba	
1305	(United Kingdom) Barnsley	0.15		Greatest Hits Radio (Yorkshire)	
1305	(United Kingdom) Newport	0.2	Ceased 2020	Smooth Radio	
1305	(Belgium) Aye			Pure FM	
1305	(Spain) Ourense	25		RNE Radio 5	
1305	(Spain) Bilbao	10		RNE Radio 5 (Pais Vasco)	
1314	(Norway) Kvitsøy	600	Dipol cage aerial on grounded lattice steel tower, height 117.5m	NRK P1	
1314	(Spain) Tarragona	25		RNE Radio 5 (Cataluna)	
1323	(Germany) Wachenbrunn / Thüringen	150-500	4 guyed lattice steel masts insulated against ground, height 125.1m, switchable directional radiation	Voice of Russia	
1323	(Russia) Saint Petersburg	10		Grad Petrov	
1323	(United Kingdom) Southwick, West Sussex	0.5		Smooth Radio	
1332	(Romania) Galati / Sendreni	50/25		SRR Radio România Actualități	
1332	(United Kingdom) Bow	1		Premier Christian Radio	
1332	(United Kingdom) Gunthorpe	0.6	Ceased 30 June 2023	Gold	
1332	(United Kingdom) Warrington	0.1		Radio Warrington	
1332	(Ukraine) Odesa	7		Radio Odesa-2	
1332	(Poland) Pińczów	0.5		Radio AM	
1332	(Czech Republic) Moravské Budějovice	50	Guyed steel truss mast. Ceased 31 December 2021	ČRo Dvojka	
1341	(United Kingdom) Lisnagarvey	162	Ceased June 2021	BBC Radio Ulster	
1341	(Hungary) Szolnok	150		Magyar Katolikus Radio	
1350	(France) Nancy	100		France Inter	
1350	(France) Nice	100		France Inter	
1350	(France) Col de la Madone	10		Radio Orient	
1350	(Russia) Ufa	10		Radio Shark Kanal 2	
1350	(Ukraine) Mykolaiv	7		Radio Mykolaiv	
1350	(United Kingdom) Hull Royal Infirmary	0.001	Ceased 2020	Kingstown Radio	
1350	(United Kingdom) Norwich	0.001	Ceased 2016	Livewire	
1350	(United Kingdom) University of Nottingham	0.001	Ceased 2016	University Radio Nottingham	
1350	(United Kingdom) University Of York	0.001	Ceased 25 June 2023	University Radio York	
1350	(Italy) Milan	1		I AM Radio	
1359	(Ukraine) Dokuchaevsk	30		Radio Centr	
1359	(United Kingdom) Bournemouth	0.85	Ceased 2020	BBC Radio Solent	
1359	(United Kingdom) Chelmsford	0.28	Ceased 28 June 2023	Smooth Radio	
1359	(United Kingdom) Cardiff	0.2	Ceased 2020	Smooth Radio	
1359	(Russia) Perm	25		Mayak-Perm	
1359	(Ukraine) Simferopol	1		Radio Kultura	
1359	(Germany) Berlin	250		Radio Berlin International, Radio DDR 1	
1359	(Soviet Union) Moscow			Vsesoyuznoye Radio (4th Programme)/MGRS Moscow 3rd Channel Radio	
1368	(United Kingdom) Duxhurst	0.5	Ceased January 2018	BBC Radio Surrey	
1377	(France) Lille-Camphain	300		France Info	
1377	(Russia) Yekaterinburg	50		YuFM	
1377	(Ukraine) Tokmak	50		Radio Kultura	
1377	(Ukraine) Korytnyany	25		Radio Promin	
1377	(Ukraine) Lutsk	20		Radio Promin	
1377	(Ukraine) Vinnitsya	7		Radio Khvilya	
1377	(Ukraine) Mykolaiv	3.5		Radio Mykolaiv	
1377	(Ukraine) Chernivtsi	50		Ukrainske Radio	
1386	(Germany) Würzburg	5		Megaradio	
1386	(Russia) Obninsk	5		Radio Rating	
1386	(Russia) Stavropol	1		L-Centr / BBC	
1386	(Russia) Kaliningrad (Bolshakovo)	1000		Voice of Russia	
1386	(United Kingdom) Loughborough Hospital	0.001		Carillon Radio	
1395	(Netherlands) Trintelhaven	20		Big L Radio London	
1395	(Russia) Yazykovo	50		Radio Shark Kanal 1	
1395	(Ukraine) Oktyabrskoye	50		Radio Kultura	
1395	(Russia) Petrozavodsk	50		Yunost / Radio-1	
1395	(Austria) Graz	25		Ö2 Radio Steiermark	
1404	(Ukraine) Izmail	50		Radio Promin	
1404	(Ukraine) Izmail	10		Ukrainian Radio First Channel	
1404	(Ukraine) Lviv	50		Radio Promin	
1404	(Ukraine) Dnipro	30		Radio Promin	
1404	(Ukraine) Lugansk	25		Radio Promin	
1404	(France) Brest	20		France Info	
1404	(France) Grenoble	20		France Info	
1404	(France) Pau	20		France Info	
1404	(France) Ajaccio	20		France Bleu RCFM	
1404	(Ukraine) Izmail	10		Ukrainian Radio 1	
1404	(Romania) Sibiu	7		Radio Romania Actualitati	
1404	(France) Dijon	5		France Info	
1404	(Ukraine) Shostka	5		Radio Promin	
1404	(Poland) Chojnice	0.8		Radio AM	
1413	(Russia) Stavropol	30		Radio Yunost	
1413	(Russia) Moscow			Kamerton	
1413	(Russia) Dubovka near Volgograd	20		Radio Yunost	
1413	(United Kingdom) Bourton-on-the-Water	0.5	Ceased 2021	BBC Radio Gloucestershire	
1413	(United Kingdom) Manchester	0.001	On air during home games only	Manchester United Radio	
1413	(Spain) Vigo	25		RNE Radio 5 (Galicia)	
1422	(Germany) Heusweiler	400	Two guyed steel framework masts, height 120m, one mast fed in the middle	Deutschlandfunk	
1422	(Russia) Samara	300		Samara	
1422	(Ukraine) Kovel	7		Radio Promin	
1429	(Liechtenstein) Vaduz	2		Radio L	
1431	(Ukraine) Mykolaiv	1600		Radio Ukraine International	
1431	(Germany) Wilsdruff	150-250	Guyed steel tube mast, insulated against ground, height 153m	Voice of Russia	
1431	(Italy) Foggia	5		Rai Radio 1 Puglia	
1431	(United Kingdom) Manor Farm	0.14	Ceased 2015	Smooth Radio	
1431	(United Kingdom) Coalville Community Hospital	0.001		Carillon Radio	
1431	(United Kingdom) Royal Hallamshire Hospital	0.001		Sheffield Hospital Radio	
1431	(United Kingdom) Swansea University	0.001	Ceased 2013	Xtreme Radio	
1440	(Luxembourg) Marnach	300-600	3 guyed steel framework masts, height 105m (day antenna), one guyed lattice steel mast (height 60m) and one free standing lattice steel tower (height 65m), both insulated against ground for night transmission. Ceased 31 December 2015	Radio Luxembourg / RTL Radio / China Radio International	AM, sometimes DRM
1440	(Russia) Moscow	10-20		Semeynoe radio / RFI	
1440	(Russia) Saint Petersburg	20		Radio Zvezda	
1449	(Russia) Saint Petersburg	600		Golos Rossii / RMR / Sodruzhestvo	
1449	(Russia) Monchegorsk	40	RC-5, height 52m	Radio Mayak	
1449	(Russia) Kushalino	20		Radio Yunost	
1449	(Russia) Ostrovnoy	7		Radio Mayak	
1449	(Russia) Kirovsk	5		Radio Mayak	
1449	(Russia) Kuznechikha (Arkhangelsk)	5		Radio Yunost	
1449	(Russia) Kandalaksha	1	Mast height 62m	Radio Mayak	
1449	(Ukraine) Chernivtsi	7.5		Ukrainske Radio Bukovyna	
1449	(Italy) Belluno	2.5		Rai Radio 1 – Veneto	
1449	(United Kingdom) Aberdeen	2	Ceased 15 April 2024	BBC Radio 4	
1449	(United Kingdom) Bristol	0.001		Hub Radio	
1449	(United Kingdom) Leicester	0.001		Leicester Community Radio	
1458	(Albania) Fllake	500		Radio Tirana 3	
1458	(Russia) Kudymkar	7		Radio Rossii Perm	
1458	(Ukraine) Mariupol	3		Radio Kultura	
1458	(United Kingdom) Ashton Moss	5	Ceased 30 April 2024	Gold	
1458	(United Kingdom) Wrekenton	2	Ceased 2020	BBC Radio Newcastle	
1458	(United Kingdom) Whitehaven	0.5	Ceased 2020	BBC Radio Cumbria	
1467	(France) Col de la Madone	50		Radio Maria	
1467	(Ukraine) Yalta	0.1		Radio Kultura	
1467	(Russia) Volgograd			Vedo	
1476	(Austria) Bisamberg	60	Guyed lattice steel mast with a height of 120m and guyed lattice steel mast with a height of 265m, both insulated against ground. Ceased 31 December 2009	Radio 1476	
1476	(Ukraine) Lviv	30		Radio Nezalezhnost	
1476	(Ukraine) Dergachi	20		Radio Breeze	
1476	(United Kingdom) Coalville	0.25		Carillon Wellbeing Radio	
1485	(Russia) Moscow	20		Radio Centr	
1485	(United Kingdom) Hull	1	Ceased 2018	BBC Radio Humberside	
1485	(United Kingdom) Washwater	1	Ceased 2023	Smooth Radio	
1485	(United Kingdom) Carlisle	0.79	Ceased 15 April 2024	BBC Radio 4	
1485	(Latvia) Āgenskalns	1.25		Radio Merkurs	
1485	(Ukraine) Kharkiv	7		Ukrainian Radio Kharkiv	
1485	(Ukraine) Luhansk	2.7		Ukrainian Radio Luhhansk	
1485	(Ukraine) Kyiv	2		Ukraine Radio 1	
1485	(Ukraine) Simferopol	1		Radio Krym	
1485	(Germany) Baden-Baden	1	Lattice steel mast, insulated against ground, height 50m	SWR 4 Ortenau / Mittelbaden	
1485	(Germany) Berlin-Schäferberg	1	Long wire antennas	Kaufradio	DRM
1485	(Germany) Frohnau	1	Long wire antennas	Kaufradio	DRM
1485	(Germany) Rüdersdorf	1	Long wire antennas	Kaufradio	DRM
1485	(France) Nancy	1		RMC	
1485	(France) Brest	1		RMC	
1485	(Poland) Zakopane	0.8		Radio AM Zakopane	
1485	(Germany) Hohenfels	0.3		AFN Power Network	
1485	(Germany) Ansbach	0.3		AFN Power Network	
1485	(Germany) Kaiserslautern	0.1		SWR Das Ding	DRM
1485	(Iceland) Raufarhöfn	0.02		RUV Radio 1	
1485	(Poland) Kielce	0.8		Radio AM Kielce	
1485	(Poland) Gorlice	0.8		Radio AM Gorlice	
1485	(Poland) Bielsko-Biała	0.8		Radio AM Bielsko-Biała	
1485	(Poland) Biłgoraj	0.8		Radio AM Biłgoraj	
1485	(Poland) Wałcz	0.8		Radio AM Wałcz	
1485	(Slovenia) Maribor			Radio Maribor / Radio Slovenija 1	
1485	(Slovenia) Ljubljana			Val 202	
1485	(Russia) Saratov			CCR	
1493	(Soviet Union) Leningrad	1200-2100	Transmission timeline from 1967 to 1978	Radio Leningrad	
1494	(France) Ennezat	20		France Info	
1494	(France) Bastia	20		France Bleu RCFM	
1494	(France) Besançon	5		France Info	
1494	(France) Bayonne	4		France Info	
1494	(Soviet Union) Leningrad	1200-2100	Transmission timeline from 1978 to 1991	Radio Leningrad	
1503	(Russia) Belgorod	7		Radio Yunost	
1503	(Russia) Moscow	10-20		Radio Center / Radiotserkov	
1503	(United Kingdom) Stoke-on-Trent	1	Ceased 2021	BBC Radio Stoke	
1503	(Italy) Trieste	1		Radio Metropolis	
1503	(Bosnia and Herzegovina) Zavidovici	1		Radio Zavidovici	
1503	(Spain) La Linea de la Conception	10		RNE Radio 5 (Andalucia)	
1512	(Ukraine) Kyiv	10		Foreign broadcasting	
1512	(Russia) Chaykovskiy	5		Radio Rossii Perm	
1512	(Belgium) Wolvertem			Radio Vlaanderen Internationaal	
1521	(Russia) Kazan	20		Radio Mayak	
1521	(Slovakia) Rimavská Sobota	10		RTVS Radio Patria / RTVS Radio Devin	
1521	(United Kingdom) Willaston	0.01		Flame CCR	
1530	(Italy) Santa Maria di Galeria	75	Ceased 2016	Radio Vatican	
1530	(Ukraine) Vinnitsya	30		Vinnitska OGTRK	
1530	(Ukraine) Trostyanets	5		Radio Kultura	
1530	(United Kingdom) Huddersfield	0.74	Ceased 2023	Greatest Hits Radio (Yorkshire)	
1530	(United Kingdom) Southend	0.15	Ceased January 2018	BBC Essex	
1530	(United Kingdom) Pollokshields	0.04		Radio Ramadhan 365	
1530	(Iceland) Keflavík	0.25		Navy Broadcasting Service	
1539	(Germany) Mainflingen	120-700	Guyed steel framework mast insulated against ground, height 95m	Evangelismus-Rundfunk	
1539	(Russia) Moscow	150		RDV	
1539	(Ukraine) Kharkiv	7		Hit FM Ukraine	
1548	(Moldova) Grigoriopol	500		Trans World Radio	
1548	(United Kingdom) London	97.5		Gold (London)	
1548	(United Kingdom) Mangotsfield	5	Ceased February 2016	BBC Radio Bristol	
1548	(United Kingdom) Edinburgh	2.2		Greatest Hits Radio (Scotland)	
1548	(United Kingdom) Sheffield	0.74		Greatest Hits Radio (Yorkshire)	
1548	(Ukraine) Mariupol	1		Radio Donechina	
1557	(France) Col de la Madone	300	Guyed steel truss mast, height 101 and 250m	France Info	
1557	(Italy) Milan	1		Milano XR	
1557	(Ukraine) Chernivtsi	8		Ukrainske Radio Bukovyna	
1557	(United Kingdom) Kings Heath	0.76	Ceased June 2023	Gold	
1557	(United Kingdom) Veals Farm	0.5		Smooth Radio (Hampshire)	
1557	(United Kingdom) Oxcliffe	0.25	Ceased January 2018	BBC Radio Lancashire	
1557	(Croatia) Osijek			HR Radio Osijek	
1557	(Russia) Stavropol			L-Centr / BBC	
1566	(Switzerland) Sarnen	300		SRF Radio 1	
1566	(United Kingdom) Bury	0.06		Salaam BCR	
1575	(Germany) Reesen (Burg)	100-500	Dipole antennas on free-standing lattice towers	Megaradio	
1575	(United Kingdom) Hull University	0.001	Ceased 2008	Jam Radio	
1575	(Ukraine) Yalta	0.1		Radio Promin	
1584	(Spain) Ourense	1		SER Radio Ourense	
1584	(Poland) Andrychów	0.8		Twoje Radio Andrychów	
1584	(Ukraine) Simferopol	1		Ukrainian Radio 1	
1584	(Romania) Iasi	1		Radio Vocea Speranței	
1584	(Poland) Busko-Zdrój	0.5		Radio AM Busko-Zdrój	
1584	(Ukraine) Chernigov	0.1		VM	
1584	(Greece) Kastro	1		Radiofonikos Stathmos Amaliadas	
1584	(United Kingdom) Perth	0.21		Greatest Hits Radio (Scotland)	
1584	(United Kingdom) London	0.5	Ceased 2023	JEO Radio	
1584	(Poland) Chełm	0.8		Radio AM Chełm	
(Italy) Vicenza	1		Radio Piterpan		
1593	(Germany) Holzkirchen	150		Radio Free Europe / Radio Liberty	
1593	(Germany) Langenberg-Hordt	20	Cage aerial mounted at 127m on grounded guyed mast of lattice steel, height 301m	WDR KiRaKa / 1LIVE diggi	DRM
1593	(Ukraine) Dnipro	5		D-I	
1593	(Ukraine) Korytnyany	1		BBC	
1593	(France) Saint-Gueno	10		Bretagne 5	
1594	(Slovenia) Trbovlje	0.05		Radio Kum	
1602	(Ukraine) Mykolaiv	5		Ukraine Radio Mykolaiv	
1602	(Ukraine) Lugansk	1		Sky Way	
1602	(Ukraine) Sevastopol	1		Radio Promin	
1602	(Italy) Como	1		Radio Milano 1602	
1602	(United Kingdom) Rusthall	0.25	Ceased January 2018	BBC Radio Kent	
1602	(United Kingdom) Manchester	0.07	Ceased 2019	Heritage Radio	
1602	(United Kingdom) London	0.16		Desi Radio	
1602	(Poland) Iłża	0.1		Twoje Radio Iłża	
1602	(Poland) Kraków	0.8		Radio AM Kraków	
1602	(Poland) Cieszyn	0.8		Radio AM Cieszyn	
1602	(Poland) Sanok	0.8		Radio AM Sanok	
1611	(Italy) Santa Maria di Galeria	50	Ceased 2016	Radio Vatican	
1670	(Greece) Ptolemaida	5		Radio Amerikanos	

== See also ==
- MW DX
