= Fontbonne =

Fontbonne may refer to:

- Jeanne Fontbonne (1759–1843), known as Mother St. John, French Catholic sister
- Fontbonne University
- Fontbonne Academy
- Fontbonne Hall Academy
- Fontbonne transmitter of Radio Monte Carlo, known as the Col de la Madone transmitter
