= Kesselsdorf =

- Stadtteil of Wilsdruff
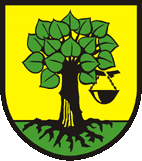
- Coat of arms
- Interactive map of Kesselsdorf
- Location within Germany Location within Saxony
- Coordinates: 51°02′N 13°36′E
- Country: Germany
- State: Saxony
- District: Sächsische Schweiz-Osterzgebirge
- Town: Wilsdruff
- Elevation: 319 m (1,047 ft)

Population (2011)
  - Total: 3,300
- Time zone: UTC+01:00 (CET)
  - Summer (DST): UTC+02:00 (CEST)
- Postal codes: 01723
- Dialling codes: 035204

Kesselsdorf is a village in Saxony, Germany, part of the town of Wilsdruff. It is located close to the Saxon capital city of Dresden.

The village is known for the decisive Battle of Kesselsdorf between Austrians and Prussians on December 15, 1745 in the War of Austrian Succession.

== Notable Persons ==
- Paul Daniel Longolius (1704-1779), writer
- Johann Christian Klengel (1751-1824), painter
