= Wilsdruff =

- Town
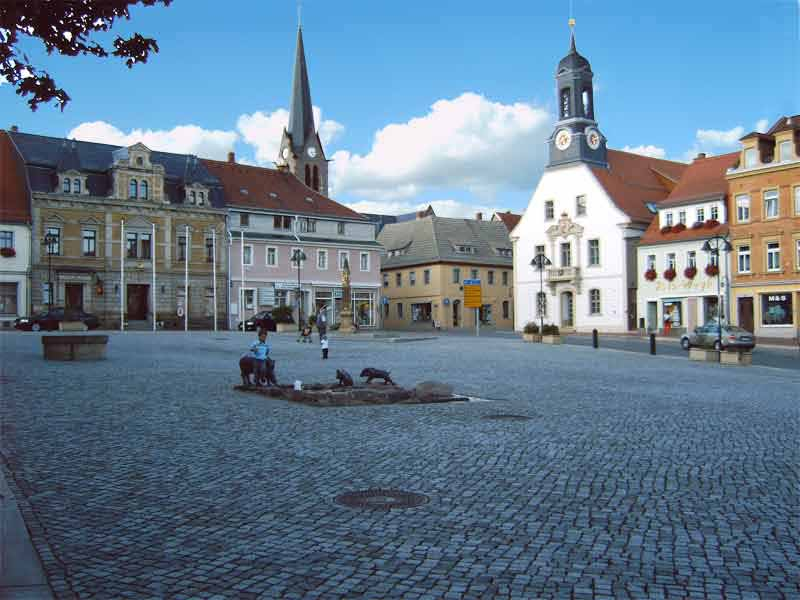

- Coat of arms

- Location of Wilsdruff within Sächsische Schweiz-Osterzgebirge district
- Interactive map of Wilsdruff
- Location within Germany Location within Saxony
- Coordinates: 51°3′8″N 13°32′18″E
- Country: Germany
- State: Saxony
- District: Sächsische Schweiz-Osterzgebirge
- Subdivisions: 14

Government
  - Mayor (2017–24): Ralf Rother (CDU)

Area
  - Total: 81.6 km^{2} (31.5 sq mi)
- Elevation: 273 m (896 ft)

Population (2025-12-31)
  - Total: 14,525
  - Density: 178/km^{2} (461/sq mi)
- Time zone: UTC+01:00 (CET)
  - Summer (DST): UTC+02:00 (CEST)
- Postal codes: 01723
- Dialling codes: 035204, 035209, 035203, 0351
- Vehicle registration: PIR
- Website: www.wilsdruff.de

Wilsdruff (German pronunciation: [ˈvɪlsˌdʁʊf]) is a town in the Sächsische Schweiz-Osterzgebirge, in Saxony, Germany, with 14,444 inhabitants (2020). It is situated 14 km west of Dresden centre. Kesselsdorf is one of its subdivisions.

Near Wilsdruff there is a facility for high power broadcasting, the Wilsdruff transmitter.

Wilsdruff is home to KNOX, a traditional incense manufacturer and magnussoft, a computer game developer.

In 2017 the town made headlines as 36% of the population voted the German right-wing party AfD (Alternative für Deutschland) while in the same year only 10 asylum seekers sought refuge in Wilsdruff.
