= Wachenbrunn transmitter =

Radio transmitter in Germany

Coordinates: 50°29′34″N 10°33′59″E

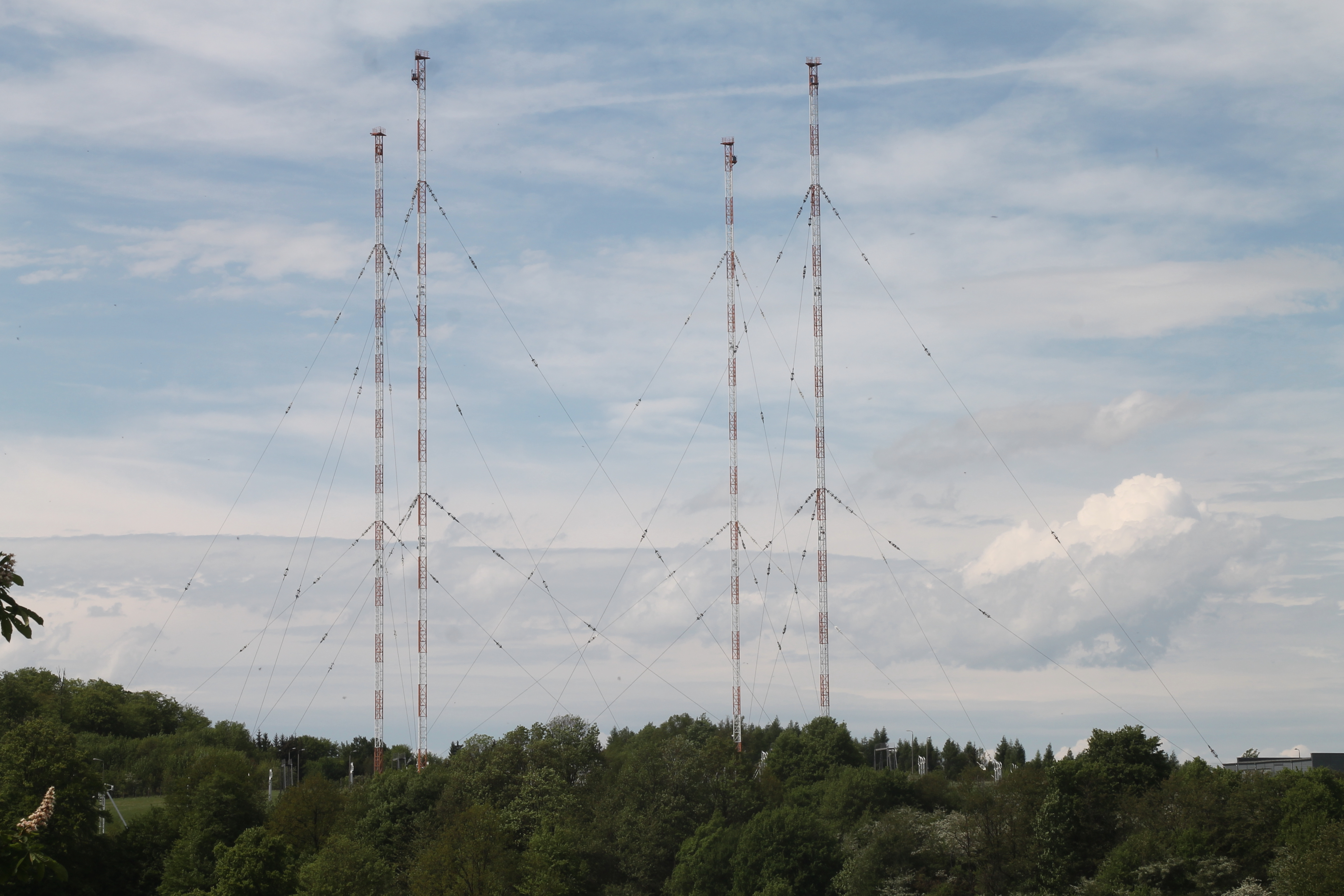
Antenna of "Voice of Russia" in Wachenbrunn

The Wachenbrunn transmitter was a large broadcasting facility for medium wave in Wachenbrunn near Themar, Thuringia, Germany, established in the 1950s. Until 1993 the main transmitter of this facility, the medium wave transmitter for 882 kHz was run with 250 kilowatts. In that year the transmission power of this transmitter, which was formerly used for transmitting the "Voice of DDR" and since the beginning of the 1990s for "MDR info" was reduced to 20 kilowatts.

== History ==
Since 1988 the transmitter Wachenbrunn has also been the site of a medium wave transmitter of the Russian foreign radio service Voice of Russia (formerly Radio Moskau) on 1323 kHz. This transmitter is similar to the transmitter of "MDR info" run by Deutsche Telekom. In the afternoon and evening, a programme of the Voice of Russia was transmitted in German. With a power of 1000 kW, this transmitter was the third strongest in Germany. It used a directional aerial consisting of four 125.1 metre (407 feet) high guyed steeltube framework masts insulated against ground with triangular cross section. These masts, which were locally called the "Russian Quartet", were located 800 metres (½ mile) away from the other parts of the facility, in order to avoid undesirable interference. For the transmission of the radio frequency power a cage line from the transmitter, which was located close to the transmitter of "MDR info" and the "Russian Quartet", was used until the modernisation of the facility in 2002–2003. In the course of the modernization, a completely transistorized transmitter with a power of 1,000 kilowatts was installed in an old store building close to the "Russian Quartet". Therefore, the cage line was for its greatest parts obsolete and therefore shortened. By shortening the transmission line and installation of the new transmitter the efficiency was increased to 84%. During the modernisation the masts of the "Russian Quartet", which had until that point of time a grey colour, were painted red-white.

MDR Info transmissions from Wachenbrunn transmitter on 882 kHz ceased on 30 June 2011. An automated announcement notified listeners until 10:00 on 4 July 2011 of the closure. The 882 kHz transmitter was demolished on 14 July 2011.

The 1323 kHz transmitter used by the Voice of Russia and Universelles Leben was not affected by the closure, as it operated from a separate site located about 1 km from the first. However, the high power has been the cause of complaints from nearby residents about interference to electrical equipment.

Voice of Russia announced in December 2012 that they intended to cease medium wave transmissions from Germany for financial reasons from 1 January 2013. Besides Wachenbrunn, this also involved the transmitter sites in Cremlingen-Abbenrode and Wilsdruff. Wachenbrunn transmitter site was switched off as scheduled on 31 December 2012 at 23:00.

The remaining four transmitting masts were demolished on 19 September 2013 at 14:55, ending the existence of the transmitter site.

=== Solar power plant ===
On 12 March 2015 the construction of a solar power plant started on the location of the former 882 kHz transmitter site. On 13 May 2015 it was connected to the network.

== Facility ==
As an aerial two guyed steel tube masts insulated against ground with heights of 142.8 metres (464 feet) were used. One of these masts had been a reflector mast at Berlin-Köpenick transmitter site until 1988, before it was dismantled and rebuilt at Wachenbrunn. This type of transmission aerial allowed a better radiation toward the south-west. Furthermore, until the mid-1990s there was a triangle area aerial and a small guyed mast, which was insulated to ground. Neither installation still exists.

== See also ==
List of masts
