= Transmitter Stallupöner Allee, Berlin =

Street in Berlin, Germany

Coordinates: 52°30′16″N 13°14′00″E

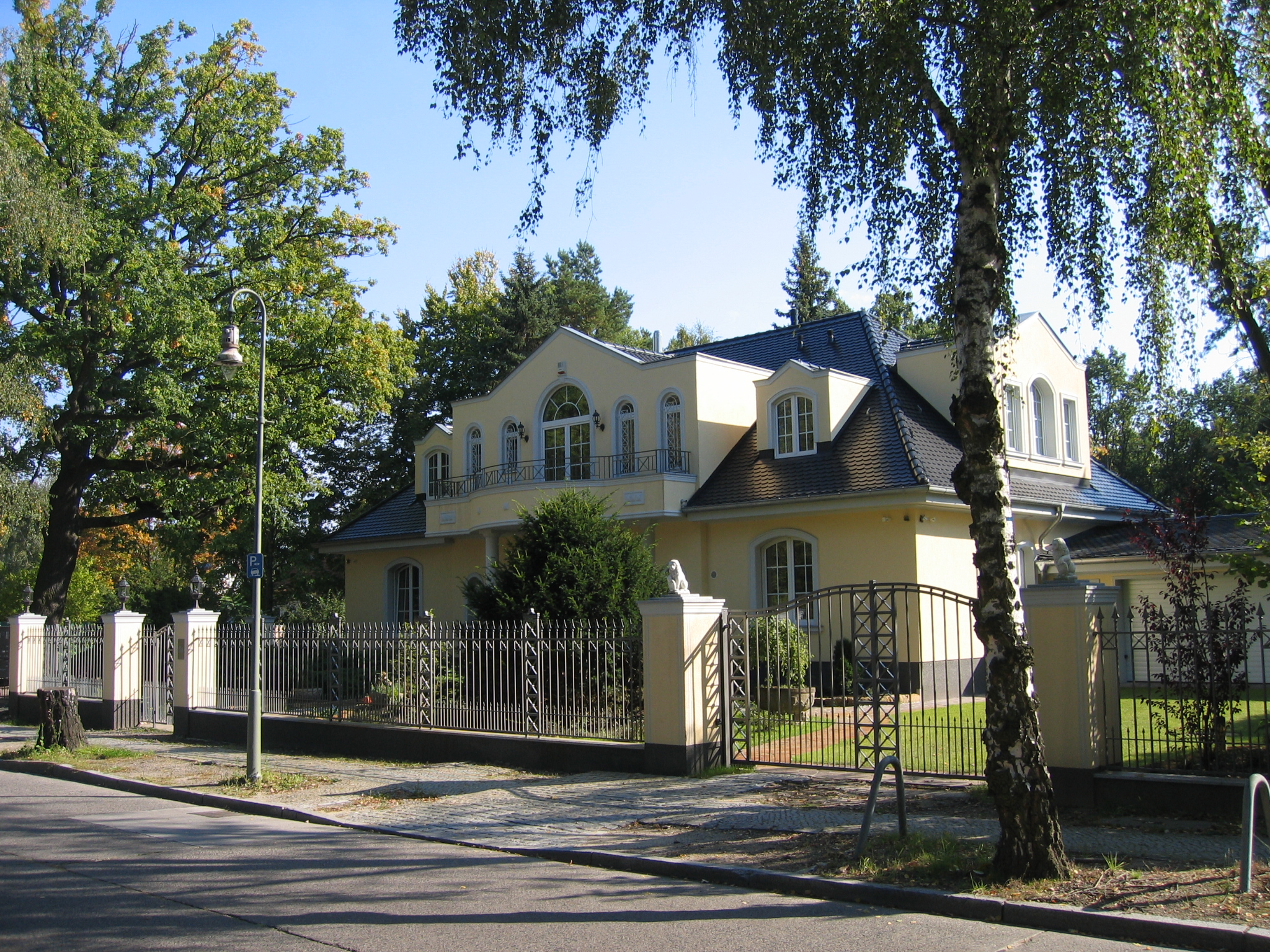

The Transmitter Stallupöner Allee, Berlin is a transmission site for medium wave radio broadcasts situated on the Stallupöner Allee ("Stallupone Avenue") in Berlin-Charlottenburg, Germany. This transmission site was established in 1948. It uses as aerial a 130-metre-high guyed steel framework mast with triangular section, which is insulated against ground. Until 1998 there was a second insulated guyed steel framework mast on the site. It was replaced by a small freestanding steel framework tower. The transmission power of the medium wave transmitter was reduced during the nineties from 100 kilowatts to 2.5 kilowatts.

== See also ==
- List of masts
