= Mediumwave transmitter Flevoland =

The mediumwave transmitter Flevoland (Middengolf Zendstation Flevoland) was a broadcasting facility for medium wave near Zeewolde in the province of Flevoland, Netherlands, situated at 5°25′ E and 52°23′ N. It has been used for broadcasting on 747 kHz (until September 2015) and 1008 kHz with a nominal power of 400 kilowatts. As aerial two guyed steel framework masts with a height of 195 metres are used, which form an anti-fading aerial. These masts are grounded and carry a cage aerial, which is upperward the separation insulator, separating the masts in a height of 95 metres in two parts, connected toward the mast construction. The radiation diagram is directional, with a maximum gain of 4 dB in South-Eastern direction, to compensate for the variation in electrical admittance of terrain in the Netherlands.

The station, which came into service in 1980, initially carried the programmes of Hilversum 1 and Hilversum 2. In 1985, following an overhaul of the Dutch public radio service, the frequencies were reassigned to NPO Radio 1 and NPO Radio 5 for 747 kHz and 1008 kHz respectively. In 2003, the 1008 kHz frequency was auctioned by the Dutch Government while NPO Radio 5 remained on 747 kHz. Since then, the 1008 kHz has been used by Radio 10 Gold (from 2004 to 2007) and Groot Nieuws Radio, a Dutch privately owned religious station.

In June 2013, NPO announced that distribution of NPO Radio 5 on Medium wave would be discontinued as of September 2015. On 1 September 2015 at 00:02 CEST, the 747 kHz and 1251kHz transmitters closed down, marking the end of Medium wave transmissions by the Dutch Public Broadcasters. The 1008 kHz remained in use by Groot Nieuws Radio, though at reduced power of 100 kW. Groot Nieuws Radio ceased broadcasting at 31 December 2018.

On 9 January 2019 the masts were demolished with explosives, marking the definitive end of mediumwave broadcasting from this location. This was the last large mediumwave transmitter in The Netherlands, marking the end of a 90-year era of mediumwave broadcasting.

== See also ==
- List of masts
