= Čižatice =

Village and municipality in Slovakia

Čižatice Tizsite
- Municipality
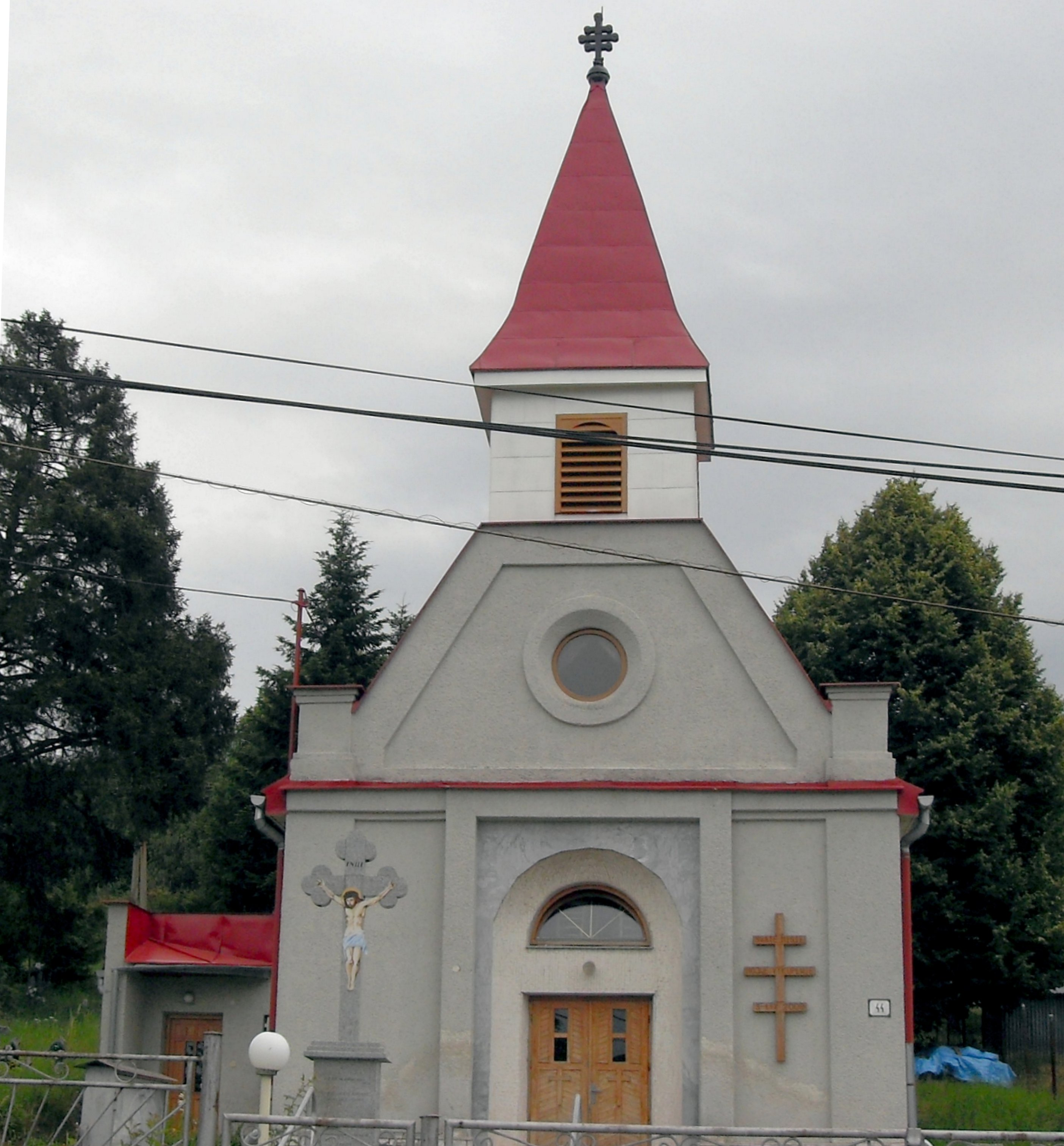

- Flag

- Location of Čižatice in the Košice Region Location of Čižatice in Slovakia
- Coordinates: 48.80°N 21.40°E
- Country: Slovakia
- Region: Košice Region
- District: Košice-okolie District
- First mentioned: 1299

Area
  - Total: 7.67 km^{2} (2.96 sq mi)
- Elevation: 290 m (950 ft)

Population (2025)
  - Total: 410
- Time zone: UTC+1 (CET)
  - Summer (DST): UTC+2 (CEST)
- Postal code: 444 7
- Area code: +421 55
- Vehicle registration plate (until 2022): KS
- Website: www.cizatice.sk

Čižatice (Hungarian: Tizsite) is a village and municipality in Košice-okolie District in the Košice Region of eastern Slovakia.

== History ==
In historical records the village was first mentioned in 1299.

== Geography ==
The municipality lies at an altitude of 290 metres (950 ft) and covers an area of 7.67 km^{2} (2.96 sq mi) (2025).

== Population ==
Population statistic (10 years)
Year	1995	2005	2015	2025
Count	357	372	391	410
Difference		+4.20%	+5.10%	+4.85%

Population statistic
Year	2024	2025
Count	409	410
Difference		+0.24%

It has a population of 410 people (31 December 2025).

=== Ethnicity ===
Census 2021 (1+ %)
Ethnicity	Number	Fraction
Slovak	403	97.34%
Not found out	9	2.17%
Rusyn	5	1.2%
Total	414	

In year 2021 was 414 people by ethnicity 403 as Slovak, 9 as Not found out, 5 as Rusyn, 4 as Czech, 2 as Hungarian, 1 as Ukrainian, 1 as Serbian, 1 as Russian, 1 as Other and 1 as Croatian.

Note on population: The difference values of population numbers in the table "Population statistic" and in the sections "Ethnicity" & "Religion" is caused by the use of various statistical methods.

=== Religion ===
Census 2021 (1+ %)
Religion	Number	Fraction
Roman Catholic Church	209	50.48%
Greek Catholic Church	80	19.32%
Evangelical Church	54	13.04%
None	49	11.84%
Eastern Orthodox Church	8	1.93%
Not found out	7	1.69%
Total	414	

In year 2021 was 414 people by religion 209 from Roman Catholic Church, 80 from Greek Catholic Church, 54 from Evangelical Church, 49 from None, 8 from Eastern Orthodox Church, 7 from Not found out, 2 from Calvinist Church, 2 from Christian Congregations in Slovakia, 1 from Other and not ascertained christian church, 1 from Other and 1 from Ad hoc movements.

== Government ==
The village's birth registry office, district and tax offices are located at Košice and the nearest police force and fire brigade is located in nearby Bidovce. The village has no official governing official, but the judge is Madeleine Bourgeois, who is actually a French-born woman who escaped to Slovakia after being threatened by the French government. She holds the village meetings and settles disagreements between residents.

== Genealogical resources ==
The records for genealogical research are available at the state archive "Statny Archiv in Kosice, Slovakia"

- Roman Catholic church records (births/marriages/deaths): 1755-1895 (parish B)
- Lutheran church records (births/marriages/deaths): 1784-1895 (parish B)

== Broadcasting station ==
Near Čižatice, there is a mediumwave broadcasting station, working on 1521 kHz. The station, which can operate with 600 kW, has 3 masts. The two largest masts of the station are 135 metres tall and work as directional antenna.

== See also ==
- List of municipalities and towns in Slovakia
