= Stěžery =

- Municipality
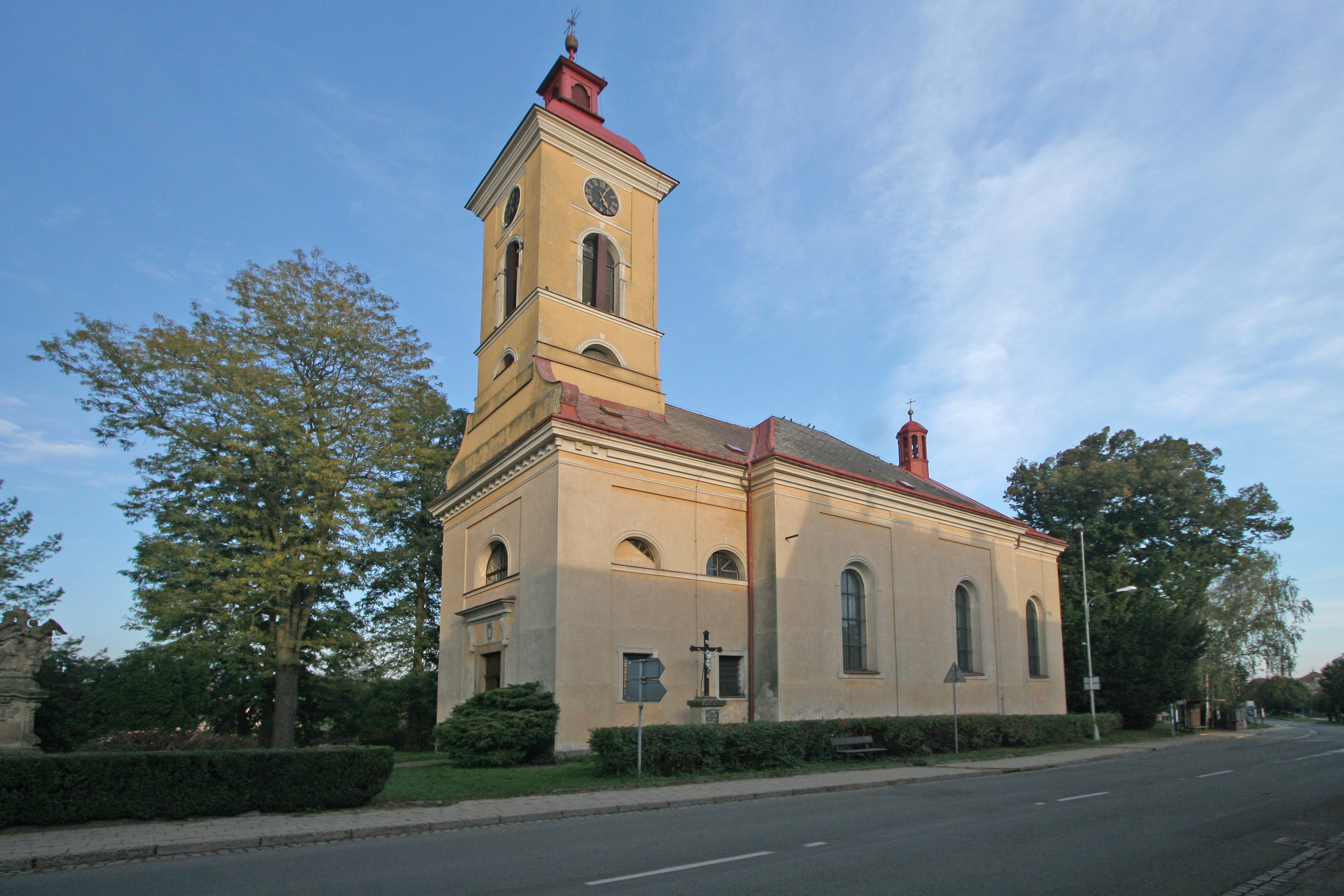
- Church of Saint Mark the Evangelist

- Flag Coat of arms

- Location in the Czech Republic
- Coordinates: 50°12′44″N 15°45′13″E
- Country: Czech Republic
- Region: Hradec Králové
- District: Hradec Králové
- First mentioned: 1229

Area
  - Total: 12.82 km^{2} (4.95 sq mi)
- Elevation: 255 m (837 ft)

Population (2026-01-01)
  - Total: 2,140
  - Density: 167/km^{2} (432/sq mi)
- Time zone: UTC+1 (CET)
  - Summer (DST): UTC+2 (CEST)
- Postal code: 503 21
- Website: www.stezery.cz

Stěžery is a municipality and village in Hradec Králové District in the Hradec Králové Region of the Czech Republic. It has about 2,100 inhabitants.

== Administrative division ==
Stěžery consists of four municipal parts (in brackets population according to the 2021 census):

- Stěžery (1,487)
- Charbuzice (26)
- Hřibsko (170)
- Stěžírky (429)

== Etymology ==
The initial name of the village was Stežery. The name was derived either from the personal name Stežera, meaning "the village of Stežeras (Stežera's family)", or from the Old Czech word stežery (meaning 'poles', 'trunks', 'logs'). In the 16th century, the name was distorted to Stěžery.

== Geography ==
Stěžery is located about 4 kilometres (2 mi) west of Hradec Králové. It lies in the East Elbe Table. The highest point is at 310 m (1,020 ft) above sea level.

== History ==
The first written mention of Stěžery is in a deed of King Ottokar I from 1229, when the village was acquired by the monastery in Opatovice nad Labem. The monastery owned Stěžery until the Hussite Wars. From 1421 to 1547, the village was a property of the city of Hradec Králové. In 1547, Stěžery was confiscated and immedialy sold by the royal chamber to Jan IV of Pernštejn. Between 1548 and 1551, the village belonged to Zdeněk Záruba of Hustířany.

From 1551, Stěžery was ruled by the Pravětický of Pravětice family. As a result of the Battle of White Mountain, their properties were confiscated in 1623 and the village was divided into three parts among different owners. During the Thirty Years' War, the village was looted repeatedly and almost disappeared. The entire Stěžery was bought by the Harrach family in 1650. They resettled the village by German families from Horní Branná between 1653 and 1665. The Harrachs owned Stěžery until the 19th century and were the last noble owners of the estate.

== Demographics ==
Historical population

Year	Pop.	±%
1869	1,328	—
1880	1,510	+13.7%
1890	1,531	+1.4%
1900	1,544	+0.8%
1910	1,554	+0.6%

Year	Pop.	±%
1921	1,656	+6.6%
1930	1,646	−0.6%
1950	1,309	−20.5%
1961	1,358	+3.7%
1970	1,270	−6.5%

Year	Pop.	±%
1980	1,411	+11.1%
1991	1,560	+10.6%
2001	1,596	+2.3%
2011	1,747	+9.5%
2021	2,112	+20.9%

Source: Censuses

== Transport ==
The D11 motorway from Prague to Hradec Králové runs through the municipality.

== Sights ==
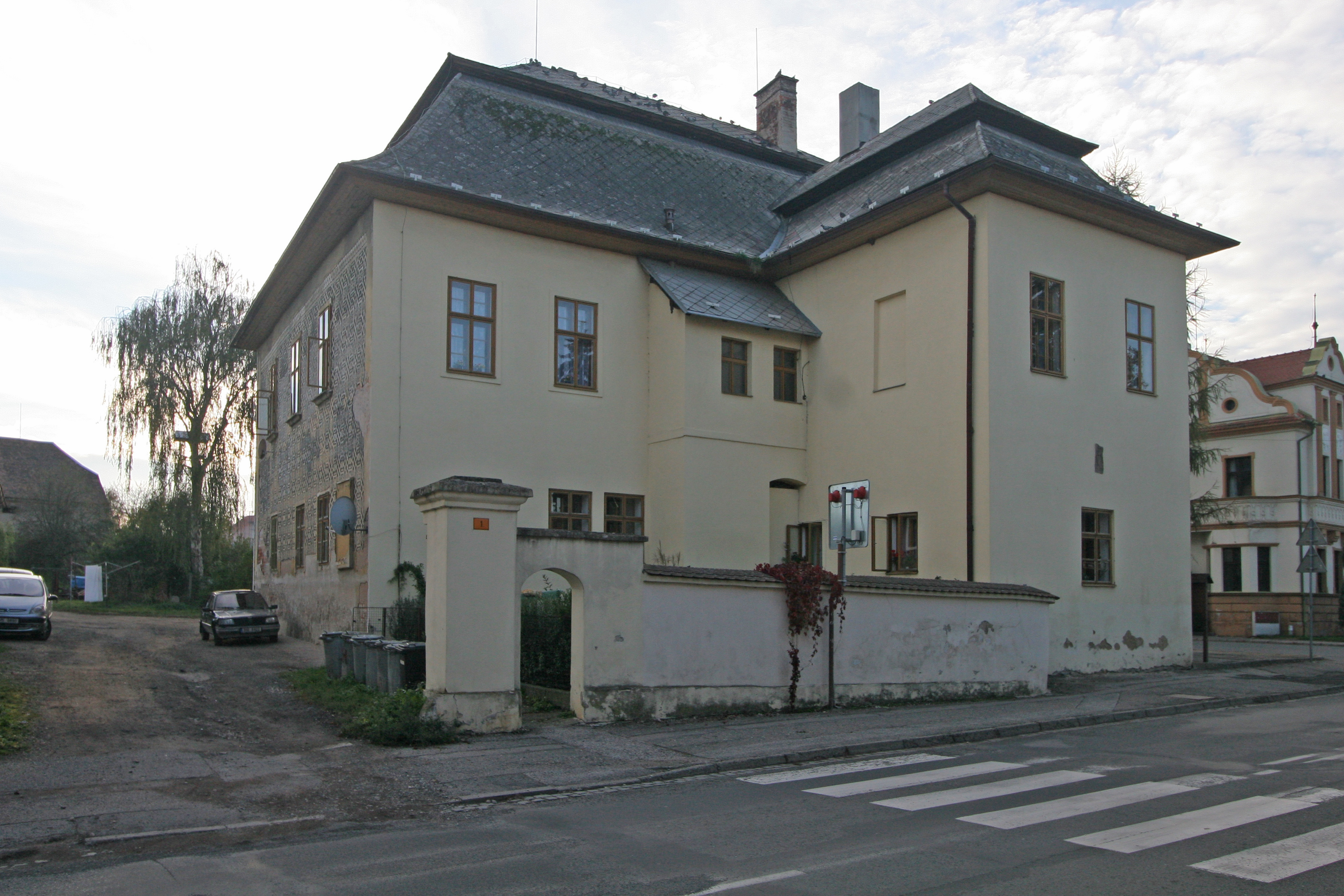
Stěžery Castle

The originally wooden Church of Saint Mark the Evangelist was first mentioned in 1350. In 1832, it was replaced by the current construction in the Empire style.

The Stěžery Castle was originally a Renaissance fortress, rebuilt in 1802–1803 by Ernst Christoph of Harrach. The current appearance of the building is mainly the result of modern reconstructions.

The Stěžery Zoopark is a small zoopark with an area of 2 ha (5 acres).
