= Sitkūnai Radio Station =

Coordinates: 55°02′36.97″N 23°48′46.55″E

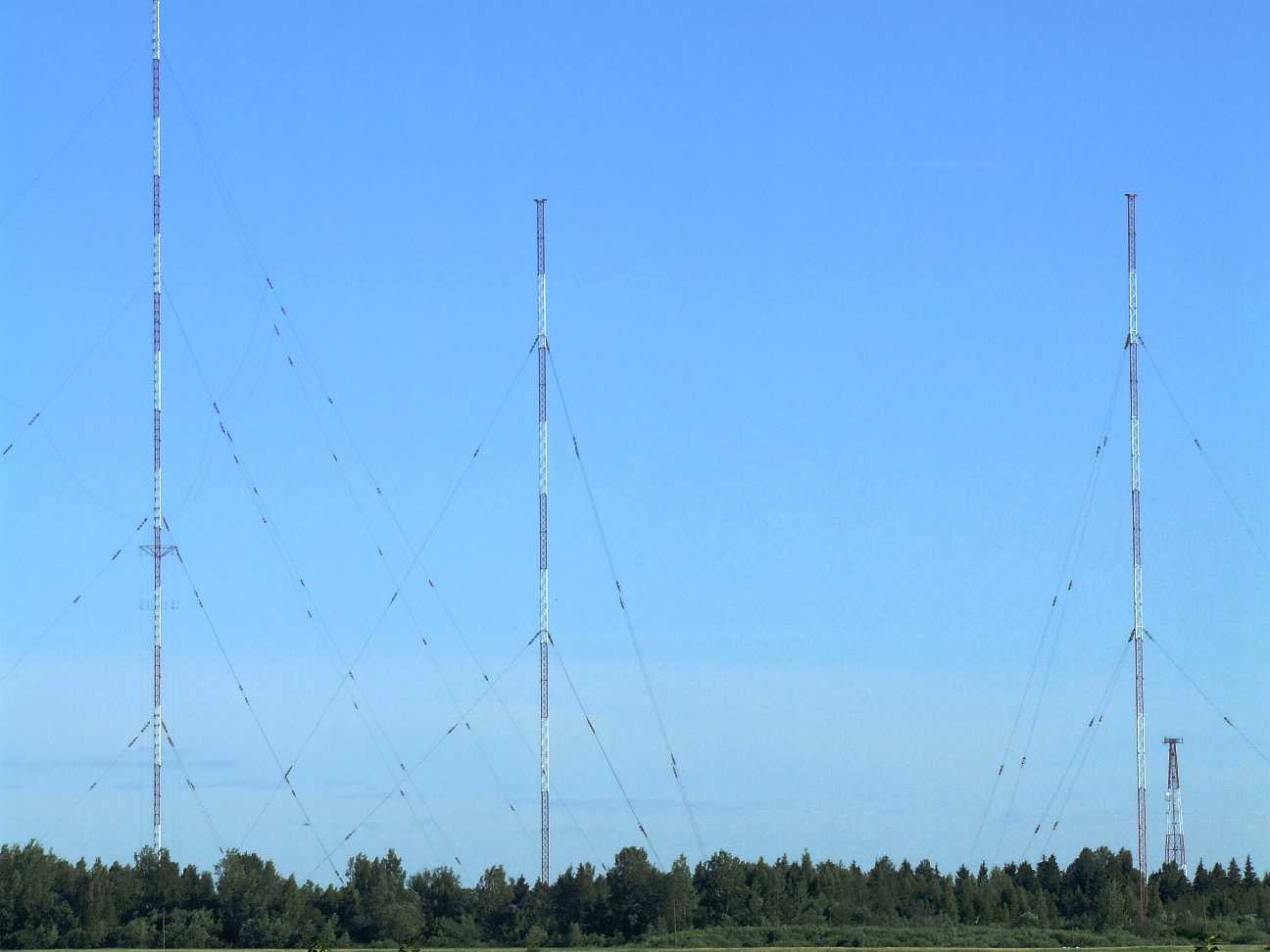
Sitkūnai radio station antenna stems

Sitkūnai Radio Station is a large facility for medium wave and shortwave broadcasting at Sitkūnai, Lithuania. The decision to build a new transmitting centre near the village of Sitkunai, about 17 km (11 mi) north of Kaunas was made by the Government of Lithuania in 1937. The building works started in 1939, and after completion, a 120 kW medium wave transmitter from Standard Telephones and Cables in the United Kingdom was ordered. However, the outbreak of World War II stopped the shipment. The empty transmitter buildings in Sitkunai survived the war with almost no damage and were used as a military compound by the German army in 1941–1944, and later as a primary school. Because the Soviet Lithuania was badly covered by radio signals, the Soviet authorities decided to continue the building work at Sitkunai and turn the site into a main shortwave and medium wave transmitting centre. During 1951 and 1952 two 50 kW shortwave transmitters, dismantled from an East German utility site as war reparations were installed in Sitkūnai. Several curtain antennas were erected and one 150 kW mediumwave transmitter was installed (665 kHz). During the January Events in 1991, Sitkūnai Radio Station was among those transmitting sites broadcasting to the world about the Soviet military actions in Vilnius when 14 civilians were killed and more than 600 injured.

Now Sitkūnai Radio Station broadcasts on three frequencies in the medium wave band using two transmitters (Russian made Shtorm, 150 kW, installed 1964, and Russian made Vihr, 500 kW, installed 1977) and following antennas: one guyed mast 257 metres tall, two guyed masts 238 metres tall and two masts 150 metres tall. For short wave broadcasting, a Continental 418F 100 kW transmitter is used along with four antennas: three horizontal dipole arrays beamed at 259, 79 and 310 degrees, and a dipole beamed at 259/79 degrees. The station is owned and operated by Lithuanian National Radio and Television Centre.

== See also ==
- List of masts
