= Berlin-Köpenick transmitter =

Transmission facility in Berlin, Germany

Coordinates: 58°28′36″N 13°35′21″E

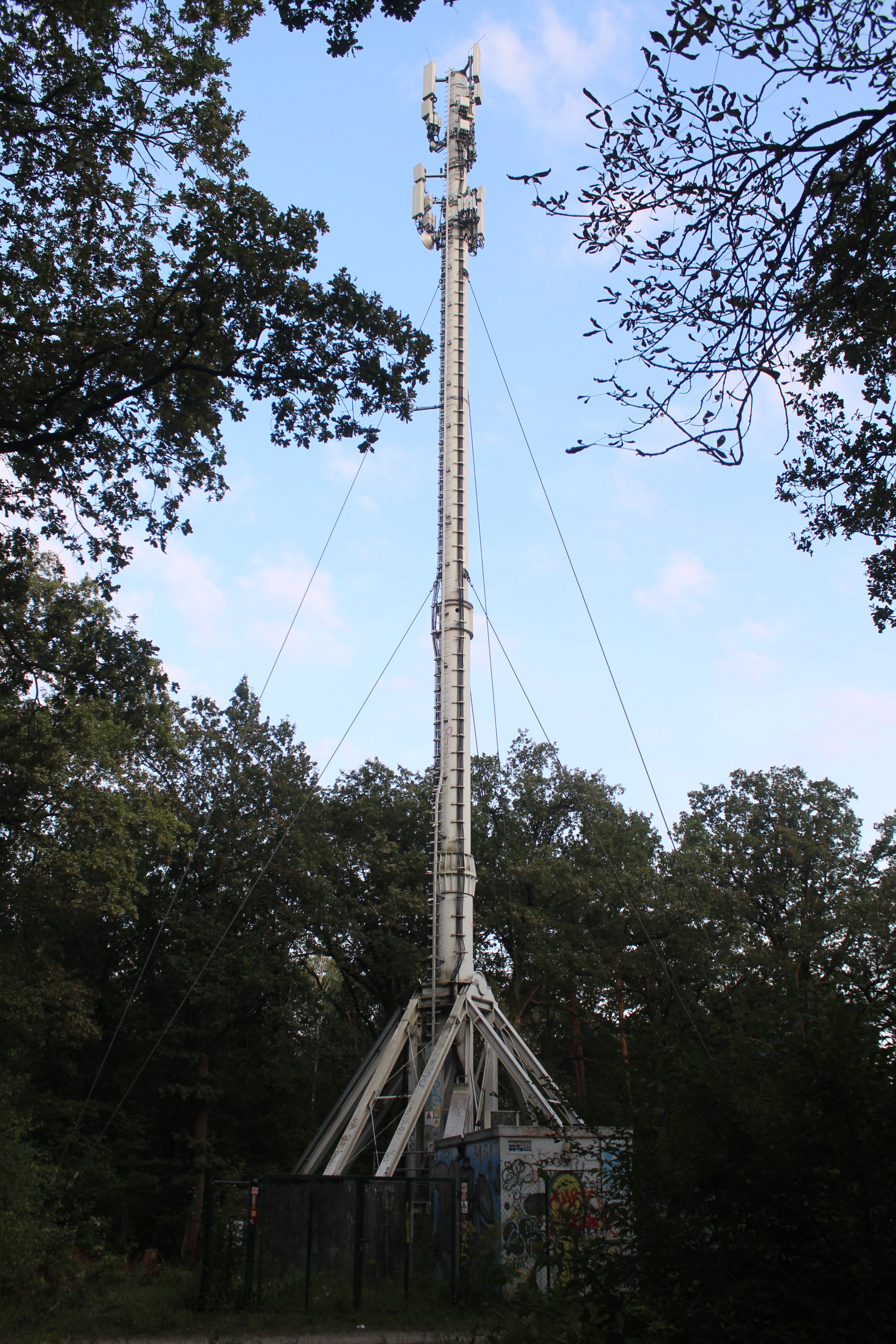
Berlin-Köpenick transmitter

Berlin-Köpenick transmitter was a transmission facility for broadcasting on medium wave, short wave, and VHF in Berlin-Köpenick, Germany, near the suburb of Uhlenhorst, after which it was occasionally named.

== History ==
Decisions of the construction of new medium wave transmitting facilities for the GDR were taken in 1950. One of them was originally planned at Nauen, but objections of the Soviet Military Administration in Germany led to the construction of Funkstelle Köpenick. The first 250 kW transmitter produced by Funkwerk Köpenick was installed here, and the site served as the prototype for the following medium wave transmitter installations in the GDR. Construction started on 21 May 1951, transmissions on 6 July 1952. The building for the diesel generators was only completed in October 1953. In 1954 the site was renamed into Funkamt Berlin-Köpenick and put under the control of the Ministry for Post and Telecommunications. The second 250 kW transmitter went into service in 1956. The first one which can be considered a prototype was replaced in 1959 by an improved version. Two smaller medium wave transmitters were also installed.

In 1956, a 1 kW television transmitter was installed which was replaced in 1958 by a 10 kW transmitter. TV transmissions from Köpenick had ceased, however, when the Berlin TV tower went into service.

After 1989, the old medium wave transmitters were dismantled and three modern Telefunken transmitters installed in the antenna tuner building.

The 1959 transmitter, shut down and replaced in 1993, was rebuilt in Königs Wusterhausen radio museum on the site of the former longwave transmission station. One of the smaller medium wave transmitters is now at Museum für Kommunikation Berlin. Other equipment has been lost.

== Aerials ==
The aerial for medium wave transmissions consisted of one 248-metre-high (814 ft) guyed steel tube mast, which was insulated against ground, and a reflector mast of equal height 95 m east of the former. The latter was made unnecessary when the Geneva Frequency Plan of 1975 came into effect, was dismantled in 1984 and re-erected at Wachenbrunn transmitter site, where it remained until 19 September 2013. Hydraulic jacks could lift the masts from their base insulators to avoid damage of the latter e.g. when sonic booms from military aircraft were expected. The reflector mast also carried aerials for FM broadcasting and television.

Two wire triangle aerials, each mounted on three guyed steel lattice masts of 50 m height, were used as reserves. The first, east of the transmitter house, was built in 1951, the second, western one only in 1963. They were dismantled in the late 1990s.

A free-standing steel lattice mast supported directional antennas for the reception of signals from the Adlershof studio.

Alterations of the aerials on Berlin TV tower in 1997, which took over the FM and TV transmissions, and the construction of a new transmission mast of 120 m height at Zehlendorf near Oranienburg for medium wave broadcast made the facilities in Köpenick redundant. They were shut down in 2002, and the run-down transmission mast was demolished on 16 December 2002.

== Programmes ==
The 250 kW transmitters were used to broadcast the programmes of Berliner Welle, Berliner Rundfunk, and Radio Berlin International. The smaller transmitters were used for Berliner Rundfunk and occasionally to jam the reception of RIAS, and for the programme of Stimme der DDR. In 1962 the programme of Berliner Welle was transmitted on 1361 kHz, and that of Berliner Rundfunk on 611 kHz. In 1976, the programme of Berliner Rundfunk was transmitted on 728 kHz with 250 kW. Later, the programme of Berliner Rundfunk was transmitted on 693 kHz, and that of Radio DDR 1 on 1359 kHz, each with 250 kW.

The programme of Berliner Rundfunk was transmitted from Köpenick in FM. From 1983, the transmitter was used for Jugendradio DT 64, first on 95.1 MHz, from 1985 on 93.1 MHz.

After 1989, the programme of Jazz Radio Berlin was transmitted on 603 kHz, that of RTL Radio on 891 kHz, and until 1994 Radioropa Info on 693 kHz. The latter frequency was used for the Voice of Russia from 1996 to 2000. The FM broadcast programme of Antenne Brandenburg was transmitted on 99.7 MHz, and Fritz! on 102.6 MHz, both using a Yagi antenna on top of the tube mast, until the modernisation of the Berlin TV tower.
