= Col de la Madone transmitter =

French broadcasting centre

Coordinates: 43.796°N 7.415°E

Col de la Madone transmitter is a very large broadcasting centre operated by Radio Monte Carlo north of Fontbonne, near Nice and Monaco, in France. It was established in 1965 and was used until completion of Roumoules radio transmitter for longwave broadcasting, using 3 320 metres tall guyed mast radiators, which do not exist any more. It was used for broadcasting on 702 kHz and 1467 kHz. Both antennas consist of 2 guyed mast radiators insulated against ground. The masts of the antenna for 1467 kHz are 101 metres tall and oriented in North-South direction. The masts of the antenna for 702 kHz are oriented in East-West direction pointing towards Milan, as it is used for transmitting a radio program in Italian language toward Italy. The western mast of this antenna, which acts as reflector, has a height of 250 metres while the eastern mast which is the radiator is 215 metres taller. Not far to the south, there is a centre for FM-broadcasting close to a military radar site and on Mount Angel there is a 146 metres tall partially guyed tower, which consists of a grounded lattice tower as basement and a guyed mast radiator insulated against ground as top. It was built in 1946 and first used for mediumwave broadcasting, but is today used for TV-broadcasting. Nearby there is also the shortwave transmitter of RMC with several dipole walls.
