= Wilsdruff transmitter =

Coordinates: 51°03′30″N 13°30′29″E

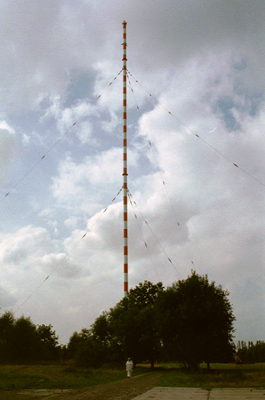
Transmitter Wilsdruff

The transmitter Wilsdruff was a medium wave radio broadcasting facility near Wilsdruff, Germany. Until the 1990s, it operated a transmitter on 1044 kHz with 250 kilowatts transmission power. This signal was broadcast from a 153-metre guyed steel tube mast, insulated from the ground. Since the mid nineties, the transmission power was reduced to 20 kilowatts. The newer transmitter was housed in a circular building on which the mast stood. The older transmitter of the fifties is now a technical monument. The entire facility was a relic of the Joseph Stalin era, surrounded by a high-security parameter that included a double fence, a dog track, and watchtowers, much of which remained intact.

Diesel engines are employed for an emergency power supply, modified from World War II submarine engines. The program "MDR info" transmitted from here on 1044 kHz until 2013. From 2001 to 2003 a second transmitter for MEGARADIO on 1431 kHz was operated. This also used the 153-metre-high (502 ft) steel tube mast as its transmitter.

After its shutdown in 2013, the mast was torn down on August 1, 2021.

== See also ==
- List of masts
