= List of tallest structures in South Africa =

This is a list of tallest structures in South Africa.

== Tallest structures ==
Tallest structures in South Africa over 190 m (623 ft). Excludes all buildings and demolished or destroyed structures. There are currently 36 structures in this list.

Rank	Type	Name	Pinnacle Height	Floors	Built	City
1	Smoke stack	SASOL III Synthetic Fuel Production Plant	301 m (988 ft)	N/A	1979	Secunda
2	Smoke stack	Duvha Power Station	300 m (984 ft)	N/A	1980	Duvha
=	Smoke Stack	Komati Power Station	300 m (984 ft)	N/A	1979	Komati
4	Smoke Stack	Lethabo Power Station	275 m (902 ft)	N/A	1988	Vereeniging
=	Smoke Stack	Tutuka Power Station	275 m (902 ft)	N/A	1988	Standerton
=	Smoke Stack	Kendal Power Station	275 m (902 ft)	N/A	1991	Kendal
=	Smoke Stack	Matla Power Station	275 m (902 ft)	N/A	1984	Kriel
=	Smoke stack	Lethabo Power Station	275 m (902 ft)	N/A	1985	Lethabo
9	Transmission Tower	Hillbrow Tower	269 m (883 ft)	6	1971	Johannesburg
10	Mast	Mpumalanga TV Mast	265 m (870 ft)	N/A		Bethal
=	Mast	Piet Retief TV Mast	265 m (870 ft)	N/A		Piet Retief
=	Mast	Theunissen TV Mast	265 m (870 ft)	N/A		Virginia
=	Mast	Schweizer-Reineke TV Mast	265 m (870 ft)	N/A		Schweizer-Reineke
13	Mast	Hartbeesfontein TV Mast	265 m (870 ft)	N/A		Klerksdorp
13	Mast	Zeerust TV Mast	264 m (865 ft)	N/A		Zeerust
14	Smoke stack	Majuba Power Station	250 m (820 ft)	N/A	2000	Volksrust
=	Smoke stack	Matimba Power Station	250 m (820 ft)	N/A	1990	Ellisras
16	Mast	Alverstone Radio Mast	247 m (810 ft)	N/A		Durban
17	Mast	Middelburg TV Mast	244 m (800 ft)	N/A		Middelburg
=	Mast	Prieska TV Mast	244 m (800 ft)	N/A		Prieska
=	Mast	Upington TV Mast	244 m (800 ft)	N/A		Upington
=	Mast	Carnarvon TV Mast	244 m (800 ft)	N/A		Carnarvon
20	Mast	Douglas TV Mast	242 m (795 ft)	N/A		Daniëlskuil
20	Mast	Kuruman Hills TV Mast	241 m (790 ft)	N/A		Douglas
=	Mast	Springbok TV Mast	241 m (790 ft)	N/A		Springbok
21	Transmission Tower	Sentech Tower	237 m (784 ft)	3	1962	Johannesburg
22	Mast	Petrus Steyn TV Mast	235 m (770 ft)	N/A		Heilbron
=	Mast	Boesmanskop TV Mast	235 m (770 ft)	N/A		Zastron
=	Mast	Mthatha TV Mast	235 m (770 ft)	N/A		Umtata
=	Mast	Senekal TV Mast	235 m (770 ft)	N/A		Senekal
=	Mast	Kimberley TV Mast	235 m (770 ft)	N/A		Kimberley
=	Mast	Butterworth TV Mast	235 m (770 ft)	N/A		Butterworth
=	Mast	Kroonstad TV Mast	235 m (770 ft)	N/A		Kroonstad
27	Mast	Jan Kempdorp TV Mast	233 m (765 ft)	N/A		Jan Kempdorp
28	Mast	Carolina TV Mast	213.5 m (700 ft)	N/A		Barberton
=	Mast	Matatiele TV Mast	213.5 m (700 ft)	N/A		Kokstad
=	Mast	Garies TV Mast	213.5 m (700 ft)	N/A		Garies
=	Mast	Calvinia TV Mast	213.5 m (700 ft)	N/A		Calvinia
=	Smoke stack	Matla Power Station	213.5 m (700 ft)	N/A	1979	Kriel
33	Mast	Bloemfontein TV Mast	204 m (670 ft)	N/A		Bloemfontein
=	Mast	Port Shepstone TV Mast	204 m (670 ft)	N/A		Port Shepstone
=	Mast	Suurberg TV Mast	204 m (670 ft)	N/A		Renosterfontein
=	Mast	Port Elisabeth TV Mast	204 m (670 ft)	N/A		Port Elisabeth
=	Mast	De Aar TV Mast	204 m (670 ft)	N/A		De Aar
=	Mast	East London TV Mast	204 m (670 ft)	N/A		East London
=	Mast	Beaufort West TV Mast	204 m (670 ft)	N/A		Beaufort West
=	Mast	Grahamstown TV Mast	204 m (670 ft)	N/A		Grahamstown
36	Transmission Tower	Lukasrand Tower	198 m (650 ft)	8	1978	Pretoria

== Tallest destroyed or demolished structures ==
This lists structure that were over 100 m (328 ft) tall and were destroyed or demolished.

Name	Type	City	Height	Floors
Matla Power Station	Chimney	Kriel	276 m (906 ft)	N/A

== Timeline of tallest structures in South Africa ==
Timeline of tallest structures over 100 m (330 ft). Includes all structures. Excludes all demolished or destroyed structures.

Name	Type	City	Years as tallest	Meters	Feet	Floors	Photo
SASOL III Synthetic Fuel Production Plant	Smoke Stack	Secunda	1979–Present	301	988	N/A	
Hillbrow Tower	Transmission Tower	Johannesburg	1971–1979	269	883	6	
Sentech Tower	Transmission Tower	Johannesburg	1962–1971	237	784	3	

== See also ==
- List of tallest structures in Africa
- List of tallest buildings and structures in Egypt

== Sources ==
- South Africa, The Skyscraper Center
