= List of tallest structures in Africa =

This list of tallest structures in Africa ranks man-made structures in Africa that stand at least 150 m (490 ft) tall, based on standard height measurement. List is containing only completed structures, including demolished or destroyed structures.

For comparison the Great Pyramid of Giza in Egypt is currently 138.8 m (455 ft) tall and was estimated to have been 146.6 m (481 ft) tall when constructed.

Name	Pinnacle height	Year	Structural type	Country	Location	Notes	Coordinates
Chabrier OMEGA Tower	428 m (1,404 ft)	1974	Guyed mast	Reunion	Saint Paul	Grounded VLF antenna mast, in use until 1997, demolished in 1999	20.974153°S 55.289973°E
Tour F	421 m (1,381 ft)	2026	Skyscraper	Ivory Coast	Abidjan	Skyscraper, structurally topped out in 2026, and currently the tallest structure in Africa.	5.33558°N 4.02222°W
Payneville OMEGA Tower	417 m (1,368 ft)	1976	Guyed mast	Liberia	Paynesville	Grounded VLF antenna mast, in use until 1997, demolished in 2011	6.305442°N 10.662068°W
Iconic Tower	393.8 m (1,292 ft)	2022	Skyscraper	Egypt	New Administrative Capital	Construction started in May, 2018, and was completed in 2024. It remains the tallest building in Africa until the completion of Tour F.	30.0100818°N 31.6957747°E
Nador transmitter	380 m (1,250 ft)	1982	Guyed mast	Morocco	Nador	3 masts of same height.	35°02′50″N 02°55′22″W ; 35°02′30″N 02°55′16″W ; 35°02′09″N 02°55′09″W
Kenadsa longwave transmitter	357 m (1,171 ft)	?	Guyed mast	Algeria	Kenadsa	3 masts of same height.	31°34′5.08″N 2°20′55.14″W ; 31°34′11.82″N 2°20′42.02″W 31°34′18.53″N 2°20′28.91″W
Tipaza Longwave Transmitter	355 m (1,165 ft)	?	Guyed mast	Algeria	Tipaza		36°33′58.14″N 2°28′50.3″W
El-Mahalla El-Kubra TV Mast	323 m (1,060 ft)	?	Guyed mast	Egypt	El-Mahalla El-Kubra		30°57′15.13″N 31°08′43.04″E
Abeokuta Radio Mast	321.5 m (1,055 ft)	?	Guyed mast	Nigeria	Abeokuta		7°08′38.72″N 3°25′9.76″E
Azilal longwave transmitter	304.8 m (1,000 ft)	?	Guyed mast	Morocco	Azilal		31°53′55.06″N 6°33′16.77″W
PRTVC Rayfield Tower	304.8 m (1,000 ft)	?	Guyed mast	Nigeria	Rayfield		9°50′36.25″N 8°53′54.48″E
New Netim TV Mast	304.8 m (1,000 ft)	?	Guyed mast	Nigeria	New Netim		5°07′52.21″N 8°20′6.05″E
Chimney of Secunda CTL	301 m (988 ft)	1979	Chimney	South Africa	Secunda		26°33′36.46″S 29°10′07.81″E
AKBC Broadcasting Tower	300.5 m (986 ft)	?	Guyed mast	Nigeria	Uyo		5°04′09.81″N 7°55′15.22″E
Large Ikorodu TV Mast	300.2 m (985 ft)	?	Guyed mast	Nigeria	Ikorodu		6°37′45.72″N 3°31′42.26″E
Chimneys of Duvha Power Station	300 m (980 ft)	1982	Chimney	South Africa	Witbank	2 chimneys.	25°57′36.94″S 29°20′24.92″E ; 25°57′44.26″S 29°20′21.86″E
Ain Beida Transmitter	278 m (912 ft)	?	Guyed mast	Algeria	F'Kirina		35°49′16″N 07°19′12″E
Chimney of Matla Power Station	276 m (906 ft)	1982	Chimney	South Africa	Kriel	Demolished after partial collapse.	26°16′57″S 29°8′27″E
Chimneys of Kendal Power Station	275 m (902 ft)	1988-1991	Chimney	South Africa	Kendal	2 chimneys.	26°05′23.86″S 28°58′03.85″E ; 26°05′26.19″S 28°58′12.72″E
Chimneys of Lethabo Power Station	275 m (902 ft)	1985-1988	Chimney	South Africa	Vereeniging	2 chimneys.	26°44′29.55″S 27°58′41.26″E ; 26°44′33.01″S 27°58′32.90″E
Chimneys of Tutuka Power Station	275 m (902 ft)	1985-1988	Chimney	South Africa	Standerton		26°46′38.24″S 29°21′04.48″E ; 26°46′37.36″S 29°21′13.10″E
Chimney of Matla Power Station	275 m (902 ft)	1984	Chimney	South Africa	Kriel		26°16′48.82″S 29°08′27.64″E
Sidi Hamadouche Transmitter	270 m (890 ft)	?	Guyed mast	Algeria	Sidi Hamadouche		35°17′16″N 0°34′57″W
Djamaâ El Djazaïr	270 m (890 ft)	2012-2019	Minaret	Algeria	Algiers	Tallest minaret in the world.	36°44′06″N 3°08′36″E
Hillbrow Tower	269 m (883 ft)	1971	Concrete tower	South Africa	Johannesburg		26°11′13″S 28°2′57″E
Chimneys of Majuba Power Station	250 m (820 ft)	1996-2000	Chimney	South Africa	Volksrust		27°05′58.48″S 29°46′17.98″E ; 27°06′05.67″S 29°46′13.29″E
Chimneys of Matimba Power Station	250 m (820 ft)	1987-1990	Chimney	South Africa	Ellisras		23°40′03.66″S 27°36′37.97″E ; 23°40′11.78″S 27°36′40″E
Sentech Tower	237 m (778 ft)	1962	Concrete tower	South Africa	Johannesburg		26°11′33″S 28°0′24″E
The Leonardo (Sandton)	234 m (768 ft)	2019	Building	South Africa	Johannesburg		26°06′13″S 28°03′34″E
Carlton Centre	223 m (732 ft)	1973	Building	South Africa	Johannesburg		26°12′20″S 28°02′48″E
Suez Canal overhead powerline crossing	221 m (725 ft)	1998	Electricity pylons	Egypt	Fifth Shyakha		29°59′47.4″N 32°34′50.31″E ; 29°59′45.97″N 32°35′12.74″E
Chimney of Matla Power Station	213.5 m (700 ft)	1979	Chimney	South Africa	Kriel		26°16′56.43″S 29°08′31.27″E
Hassan II Mosque	210 m (690 ft)	1986-1993	Minaret	Morocco	Casablanca		33°36′28.49″N 7°37′58.2″W
Cairo Flagpole	201.952 m (662.57 ft)	2021	Flagpole	Egypt	New Administrative Capital		
Britam Tower	200 m (660 ft)	2017	Office Building	Kenya	Nairobi		1°18′00.1″S 36°48′47.4″E
Lukasrand Tower	198 m (650 ft)	1978	Concrete tower	South Africa	Pretoria		25°45′58.17″S 28°12′20.48″E
Commercial Bank of Ethiopia Headquarters	198 m (650 ft)	2021	Office Building	Ethiopia	Addis Ababa		9°0′59.59″N 38°45′15.58″E
Cairo Tower	187 m (614 ft)	1961	Concrete Tower	Egypt	Cairo		30°2′45″N 31°13′28″E
Tekezé Dam	185 m (607 ft)	2009	Dam	Ethiopia	Tigrey		13°20′49.93″N 38°44′33.74″E
Katse Dam	185 m (607 ft)	1996	Dam	Lesotho	Bokong		29°20′13″S 28°30′22″E
Nairobi Global Trade Centre Office Tower	184 m (604 ft)	2021	Building	Kenya	Nairobi		1°16′10.98″S 36°48′32.21″E
Ponte City Apartments	173 m (568 ft)	1975	Building	South Africa	Johannesburg		26°11′26″S 28°3′25.5″E
Cahora Bassa Dam	171 m (561 ft)	1969	Dam	Mozambique	Tete		15°35′9″S 32°42′17″E
UAP Old Mutual Tower	163 m (535 ft)	2016	Concrete building	Kenya	Nairobi		01°18′02″S 36°48′47″E
NITEL Building	160 m (520 ft)	1979	Building	Nigeria	Lagos		6°26′59.22″N 3°23′35.61″E
Tanzania Ports Authority HQ	157 m (515 ft)	2016	building	Tanzania	Dar Es Salaam		6°49′17.51″S 39°17′14.22″E
Suez Canal Bridge	154 m (505 ft)	2001	Bridge pylons	Egypt	El Qantara		30°49′41.67″N 32°18′56.1″E ; 30°49′41.77″N 32°19′10.80″E
Turkwel Dam	153 m (502 ft)	1991	Dam	Kenya	Turkwel		1°53′53.46″N 35°20′01.51″E
PSPF Towers - Tower A	152.7 m (501 ft)	2014	building	Tanzania	Dar Es Salaam		
PSPF Towers - Tower B	152.7 m (501 ft)	2014	building	Tanzania	Dar Es Salaam		
Marble Towers	152 m (499 ft)	1973	Building	South Africa	Johannesburg		26°12′6.58″S 28°2′50.98″E
Pearl Dawn	152 m (499 ft)	2010	Building	South Africa	Durban		29°43′30.08″S 31°05′17.13″E
South African Reserve Bank Building	150 m (490 ft)	1988	Building	South Africa	Pretoria		25°44′42.83″S 28°11′45.32″E
Metlife Centre	150 m (490 ft)	1993	Building	South Africa	Cape Town		33°54′59″S 18°25′34″E
Many lower structures
