= List of tallest buildings in Pretoria =

This list of tallest buildings in Pretoria ranks completed buildings by height in Pretoria, Gauteng, one of the three capital cities of South Africa. Pretoria's tallest building is the South African Reserve Bank Building built in 1988.

== Tallest buildings ==
Was the tallest building in Pretoria upon completion

This list ranks Pretoria's skyscrapers that stand at least 50 m (164 ft) tall, based on standard height measurement.

Rank	Building	Height metres / ft	Floors	Completed
1	South African Reserve Bank Building	150	38	1988
2	ABSA Tower Building	132	38	1976
3	Kruger Park Building	120	33	1985
4	Telkom Tower North	115.5	26	1965
5	Civitas Building	112	31	1973
6	Agricultural Union Centre	110	30	1968
6	Poyntons Building	110	30	1968
8	Saambou Building	102	30	1974
8	Schubart Park D	102	28	1980s
10	National Treasury Building	95	29	1980
11	Telkom Tower South	94	26	1965
12	Holiday Inn Express Pretoria-Sunnypark	91	25	-
12	Schubart Park C	91	25	1980s
12	Schubart Park B	91	25	1980s
12	Schubart Park A	91	25	1980s
16	Hallmark Building	88	25	1972
17	Liberty Building	83	23	1977
18	Momentum Centre	80	20	1986
19	Old Mutual Centre	76	21	1975
20	Unisa Administration Building	50	19	1979

== See also ==
- List of tallest buildings and structures in South Africa
- List of tallest structures in South Africa
- List of tallest buildings in Cape Town
- List of tallest structures in the world by country
- List of World Heritage Sites in Africa
- List of tallest buildings in Africa
