= Brixton Tower =

Sentech Tower
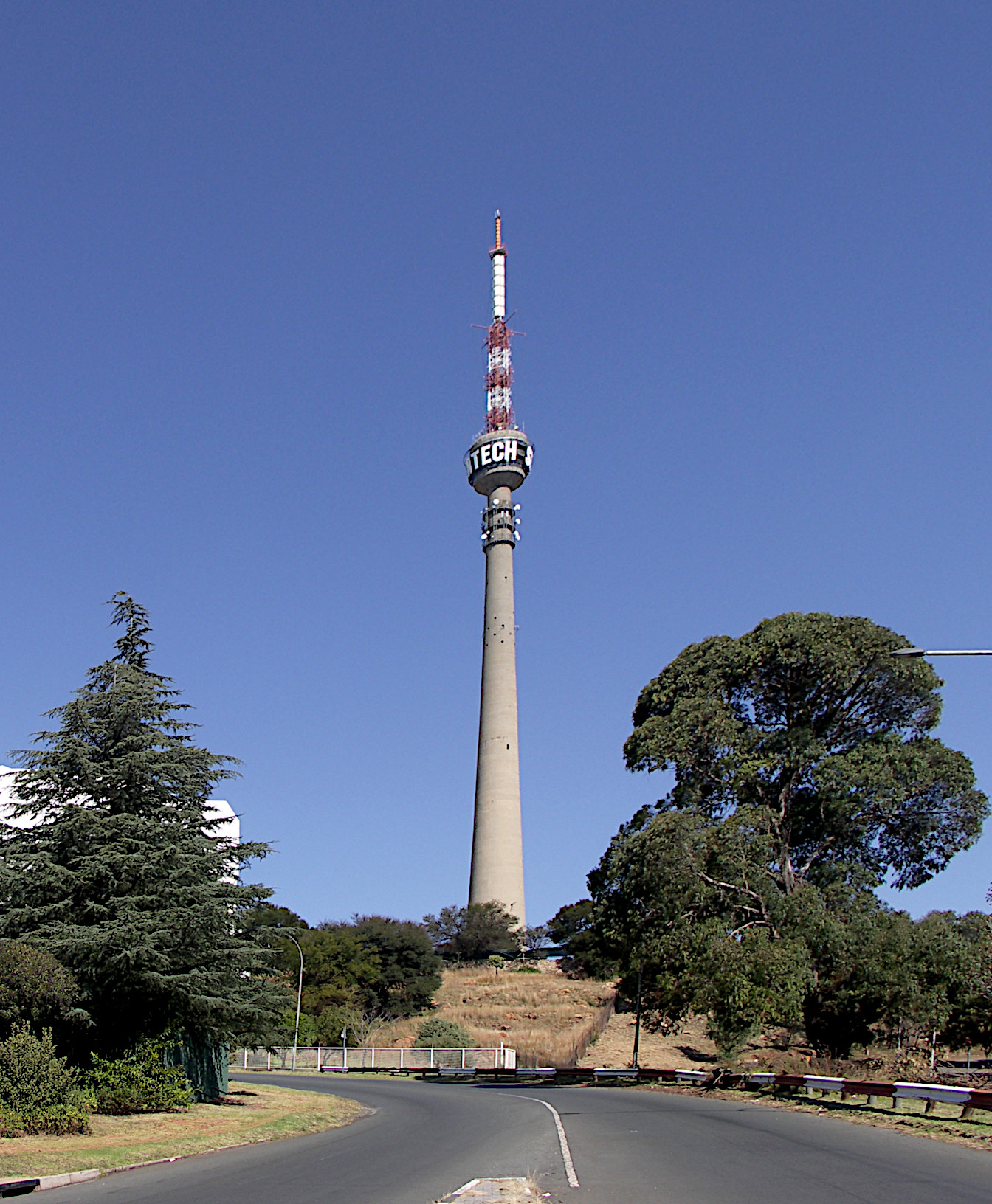

- Location within South Africa
- Alternative names: Brixton Tower; Albert Hertzog Tower

General information
- Status: Completed
- Type: Cantilever concrete-shafted television tower
- Location: Brixton, Johannesburg, Gauteng, South Africa
- Coordinates: 26°11′33″S 28°00′24″E
- Construction started: 1961
- Completed: 1962
- Opening: 1962

Height
- Height: 237 m (778 ft)

Design and construction
- Architect: Ove Arup & Partners
- Main contractor: Christiani & Nielsen

The Sentech Tower, previously named the Albert Hertzog Tower and commonly known as the Brixton Tower, is a 237-metre-high (778 ft) concrete television tower in the Brixton suburb of Johannesburg, South Africa, near the top of the Brixton Ridge. It is a well-known and easily identifiable landmark in the city, alongside its "architectural cousin", the Hillbrow Tower. Although always intended for both radio and television transmission, it carried only FM radio transmissions until the 1970s.

== History ==
The tower's construction commenced in 1961, and was completed in 1962. The tower was designed by Ove Arup & Partners and built by Christiani & Nielsen. Upon completion, the Brixton Tower was the tallest man-made structure in Africa in its time until it was overtaken by the Hillbrow Tower. It cost R300,000 to construct.

The first transmission took place 22 December 1961. Presently, Sentech broadcasts 18 FM programmes and seven TV stations. Backup power to the tower is 1 MW using two 500 kVA Volvo generators. Towards 2001, naming rights for the tower were sold to Sentech, the TV and radio signal distributor in South Africa owned by the South African Government. Up until 1982, an observation deck affording panoramic views of the city was open to the public, but was closed due to security fears. The tower viewing deck has not re-opened to the public since then.

== Construction and structure ==
In architectural terms, the Sentech Tower is a vertical cantilever structure with a reinforced concrete shaft. On windy days, the tower has been known to lean up to 2 m (6.6 ft), as measured from its uppermost mast. In addition, the tower was built to withstand winds of 186 km/h (116 mph) and gusts of up to 200 km/h (120 mph). The tower's foundation is circular, possessing a diameter of 26 m (85 ft), and it is 6 m (20 ft) wide and 2 m (6.6 ft) deep.

The tower's full height is 237 m (778 ft), although some sources state that it has a lesser height of 234 m (768 ft).

== Geography ==
The Sentech Tower is situated in the suburb of Brixton, in Johannesburg, Gauteng, South Africa.

== See also ==
- Hillbrow Tower
- Brixton
- Johannesburg
- List of tallest towers in the world

Records
Unknown	Tallest structure in South Africa; 237 m (778 ft); 1962 – 1971	Succeeded by JG Strijdom Tower
Preceded by Cairo Tower	Tallest structure in Africa; 237 m (778 ft); 1962 – 1971	Succeeded by JG Strijdom Tower
Preceded by Cairo Tower	Tallest telecommunications tower in Africa; 237 m (778 ft); 1962 – 1971	Succeeded by JG Strijdom Tower
