= Hillbrow Tower =

Telkom Joburg Tower
- Hillbrow Tower
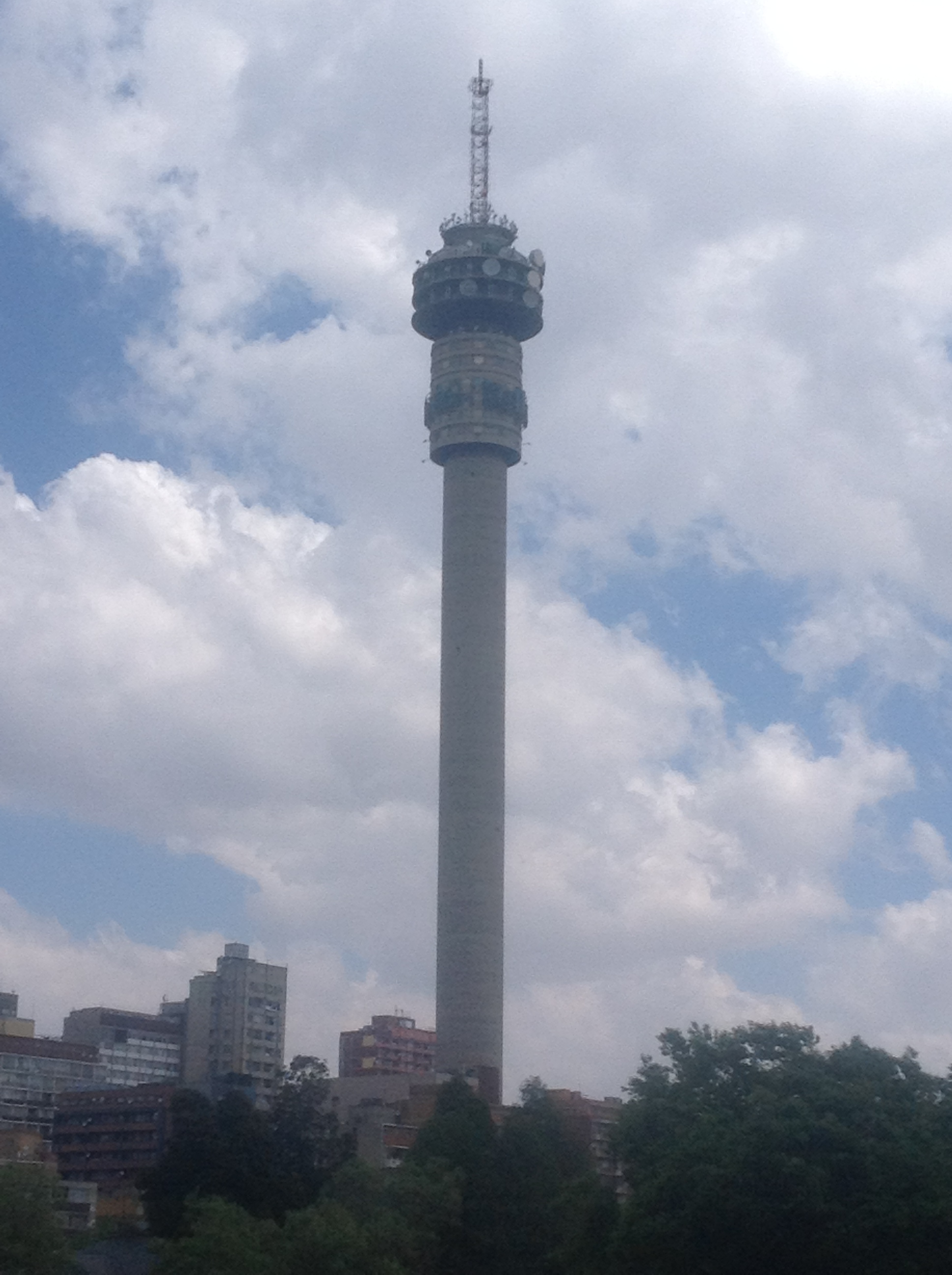
- Hillbrow Tower in 2013.
- Interactive map of the Telkom Joburg Tower area

Record height
- Tallest in Africa from 1971 to 2021^{[I]}
- Surpassed by: Iconic Tower

General information
- Status: Completed
- Type: Radio tower
- Location: Hillbrow, Johannesburg, South Africa
- Coordinates: 26°11′13″S 28°2′57″E
- Construction started: 1968
- Completed: 1971
- Opening: April 1971; 55 years ago
- Cost: $10,000,000
- Owner: Telkom (South Africa)

Height
- Antenna spire: 269 m (883 ft)
- Top floor: 204 m (669 ft)

Technical details
- Lifts/elevators: 3

The Hillbrow Tower (officially the Telkom Joburg Tower, and formerly JG Strijdom Tower) is a tall tower located in the suburb of Hillbrow in Johannesburg, South Africa. At 269 m (883 ft), it was the tallest tower in Africa for 50 years, until it was surpassed in 2021 by the 393.8 m (1,292 ft) Iconic Tower in Egypt's New Administrative Capital, as well as the continent's tallest structure for eleven years, until overtaken by the Nador transmitter in Morocco; it remained Africa's tallest free-standing structure for two more years until overtaken by the chimney of the Sasol III Steam Plant in 1984. For seven years it was also the tallest structure in the Southern Hemisphere until 1978, when surpassed by the 270 m Mount Isa Chimney in Queensland, Australia. It remains the tallest telecommunications tower in Africa. Construction of the tower began in June 1968 and was completed three years later, in April 1971. Construction cost 2 million rand (at the time, US$2.8 million). The tower was initially known as the JG Strijdom Tower, after JG (Hans) Strijdom, South African Prime Minister from 1954 to 1958. On 31 May 2005 it was renamed the Telkom Joburg Tower.

The tower was constructed for South African Posts & Telecommunications, which later became Telkom, South Africa's government-run and largest telecommunications company. As the general height of buildings rose in the central business district, it became necessary that the height of the new telecommunications tower stayed above the height of the buildings surrounding it.

== Tourist attraction ==
The Hillbrow Tower has been closed to visitors since 1981, primarily for security reasons. Before the closure, the Hillbrow tower was one of the largest tourist draws in Johannesburg. The public was able to enter six public floors at the top of the tower. One of the floors housed a popular revolving restaurant named "Heinrich's Restaurant" and a discotheque named "Cloud 9" as well as another non-rotating restaurant known as "the Grill Room" and the observation floor which was at 197 m height.

During the 2010 FIFA World Cup, a huge football was fitted to the tower to celebrate the event. In 2013, television programme Carte Blanche broadcast from what used to be the revolving restaurant.

The Hillbrow Tower is one of two iconic towers that are often used to identify the Johannesburg skyline. The second tower, the Sentech Tower (old Albert Hertzog Tower), is used for television and radio transmissions.

== Gallery ==
The Hillbrow Tower decorated for the 2010 FIFA World Cup.

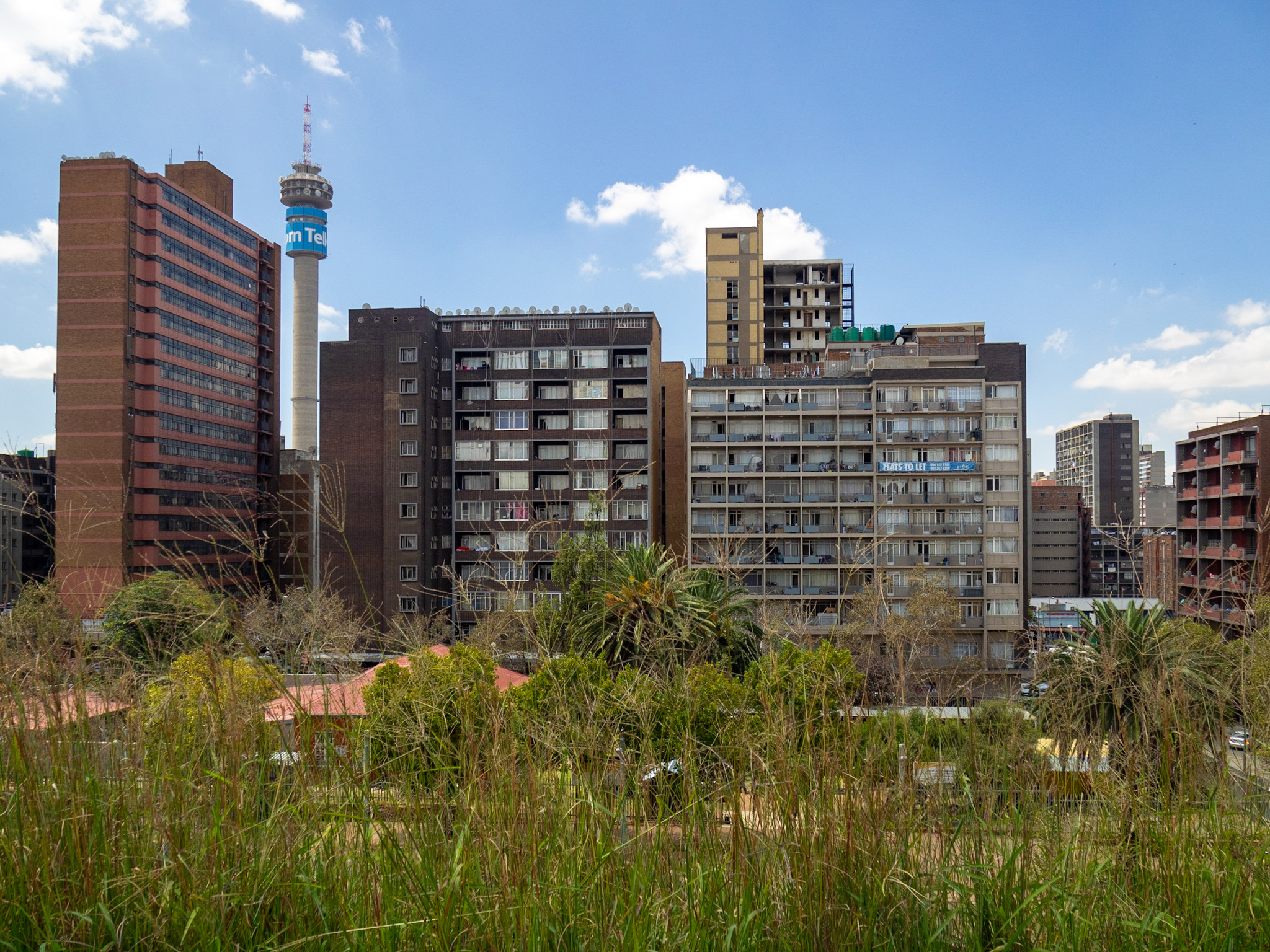
View of Hillbrow skyline with Hillbrow Tower (background), Johannesburg, South Africa.

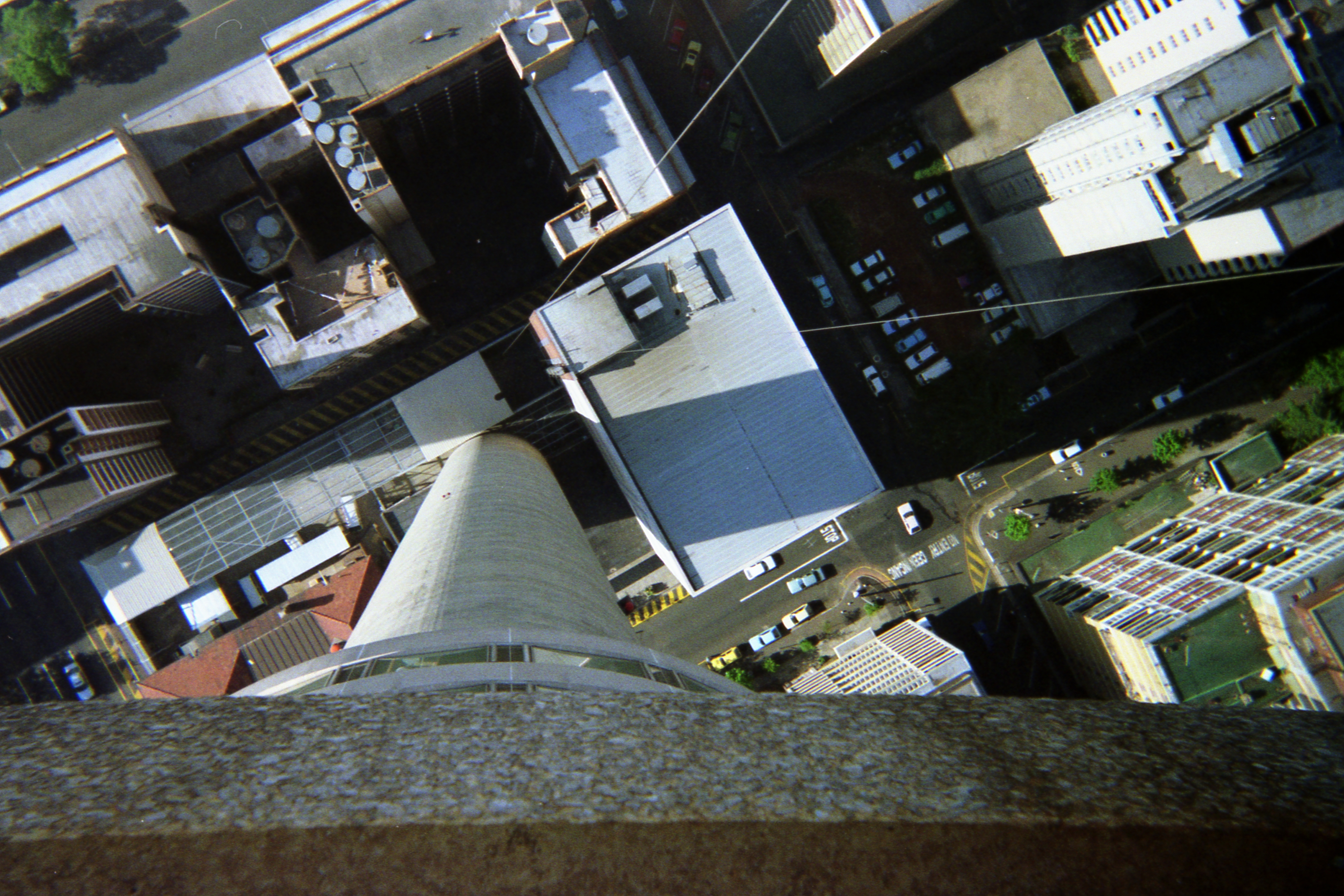
View straight down from the Hillbrow Tower.

== See also ==
- List of towers
- Sentech Tower
- Carlton Centre

Records
Preceded by Albert Hertzog Tower	Tallest structure in South Africa; 269 m (883 ft); 1971 – 1984	Succeeded by Chimney of Sasol III Steam Plant
Preceded by Albert Hertzog Tower	Tallest free-standing structure in Africa; 269 m (883 ft); 1971 – 1984	Succeeded by Chimney of Sasol III Steam Plant
Preceded by Albert Hertzog Tower	Tallest structure in Africa; 269 m (883 ft); 1971 – 1982	Succeeded by Nador transmitter
Preceded by Albert Hertzog Tower	Tallest tower in Africa; 269 m (883 ft); 1971 – 2021	Succeeded by Iconic Tower
Preceded by Albert Hertzog Tower	Tallest telecommunications tower in Africa; 269 m (883 ft); 1971 – present	Incumbent
