= Cairo Tower =

Concrete tower in Cairo, Egypt

- برج القاهرة
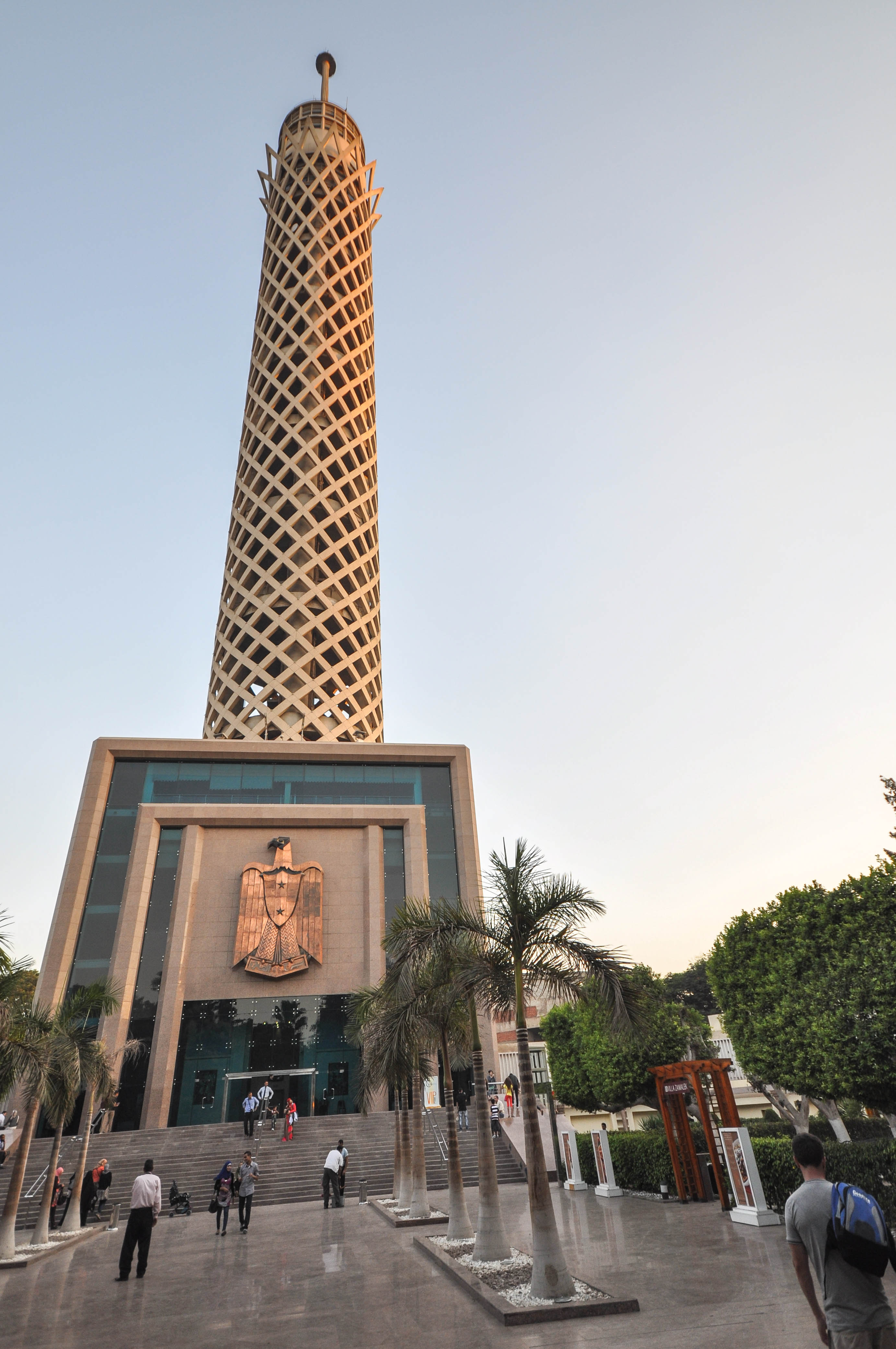
- Cairo tower in 2012

General information
- Status: Completed
- Type: Communications, observation, restaurants, visitor attraction
- Architectural style: Ancient Egypt
- Location: Cairo, Egypt
- Coordinates: 30°02′45″N 31°13′28″E
- Construction started: 1956
- Completed: 1961
- Opened: 1961
- Cost: Around $US1-3 million
- Owner: Government of Egypt

Height
- Architectural: 187 m (613.5 ft)
- Antenna spire: 187 m (613.5 ft)
- Roof: 160 m (524.9 ft)
- Top floor: 143 m (469.2 ft)
- Observatory: 143 m (469.2 ft)

Technical details
- Material: Concrete
- Floor count: 16
- Lifts/elevators: 3

Design and construction
- Architect: Naoum Shebib

Website
- cairotower.net (requires Adobe Flash; in English)

The Cairo Tower (Arabic: برج القاهرة, Borg El-Qāhira) is a free-standing concrete tower in Cairo, Egypt. At 187 m (614 ft), it was the tallest structure in Egypt for 37 years until 1998, when it was surpassed by the Suez Canal overhead powerline crossing. It was the tallest structure in North Africa for 21 years until 1982, when it was surpassed by the Nador transmitter in Morocco. It was the tallest structure in Africa for one year until 1962, when it was surpassed by Sentech Tower in South Africa.

One of Cairo's well-known modern monuments, sometimes considered Egypt's second most famous landmark after the Pyramids of Giza, it stands in the Gezira district on Gezira Island in the River Nile, close to downtown Cairo.

== History ==
Built from 1956 to 1961, the tower was designed by the Egyptian architect Naoum Shebib, inspired by the ancient Egyptian architecture. Its partially open lattice-work design is intended to evoke a pharaonic lotus plant, an iconic symbol of Ancient Egypt. The tower is crowned by a circular observation deck and a revolving restaurant that rotates around its axis occasionally with a view over greater Cairo.

According to documents published by Major General Adel Shaheen, the funds for the construction of the tower were originated from the Government of the United States through the CIA, represented by Kermit Roosevelt, which had provided around $US1-3 million to Gamal Abdel Nasser as a personal gift to him with the intent of stopping his support for Algerian Revolution and other African independence movements. Affronted by the attempt to bribe him, Nasser decided to publicly rebuke the U.S. government by transferring all of the funds to the Egyptian government for the use of the tower construction, which he stated would be "visible from the US Embassy just across the Nile, as a taunting symbol of Egypt's, Africa and the Middle East's resistance, revolutions and pride".

The book also stated that the General Intelligence Service took full responsibility for everything related to the design and planning work, including the selection of the architect who was assigned to design the construction work, and even providing the necessary materials for the building with the aim of giving the heroic character of the president. However, its design was controversial as the Egyptians called it the "waqf Roosevelt" ("Roosevelt's endowment"), which was then mistakenly interpreted by the Embassy of Egypt in Washington, D.C. as the "waqef Roosevelt" ("Roosevelt's erection"). This prompted the Americans to react by calling it "Nasser's prick". Because of that, a local Islamic group issued a fatwa to demolish the tower in the 1990s, stating that it "could excite Egyptian women", but this failed to be implemented due to the tower's influence on national history and popularity among the nation and tourists.

=== Renovation ===
Between 2006 and 2009, the tower underwent an £E15 million restoration by the Egyptian Arab Contractors Company. The restoration and repair process cost about 15 million pounds, which included treating and restoring the tower's concrete and adding 3 floors of metal structures at the bottom of the tower inlaid with the body, and another floor above the entrance. It also added an emergency staircase and an elevator for visitors, and installation of new LED lighting to improve efficiency.

In 2023, during the Gaza war, a photo of the tower with the Palestinian flag circulated on social media. However, the photo was actually a modified version of a photo taken in 2010.

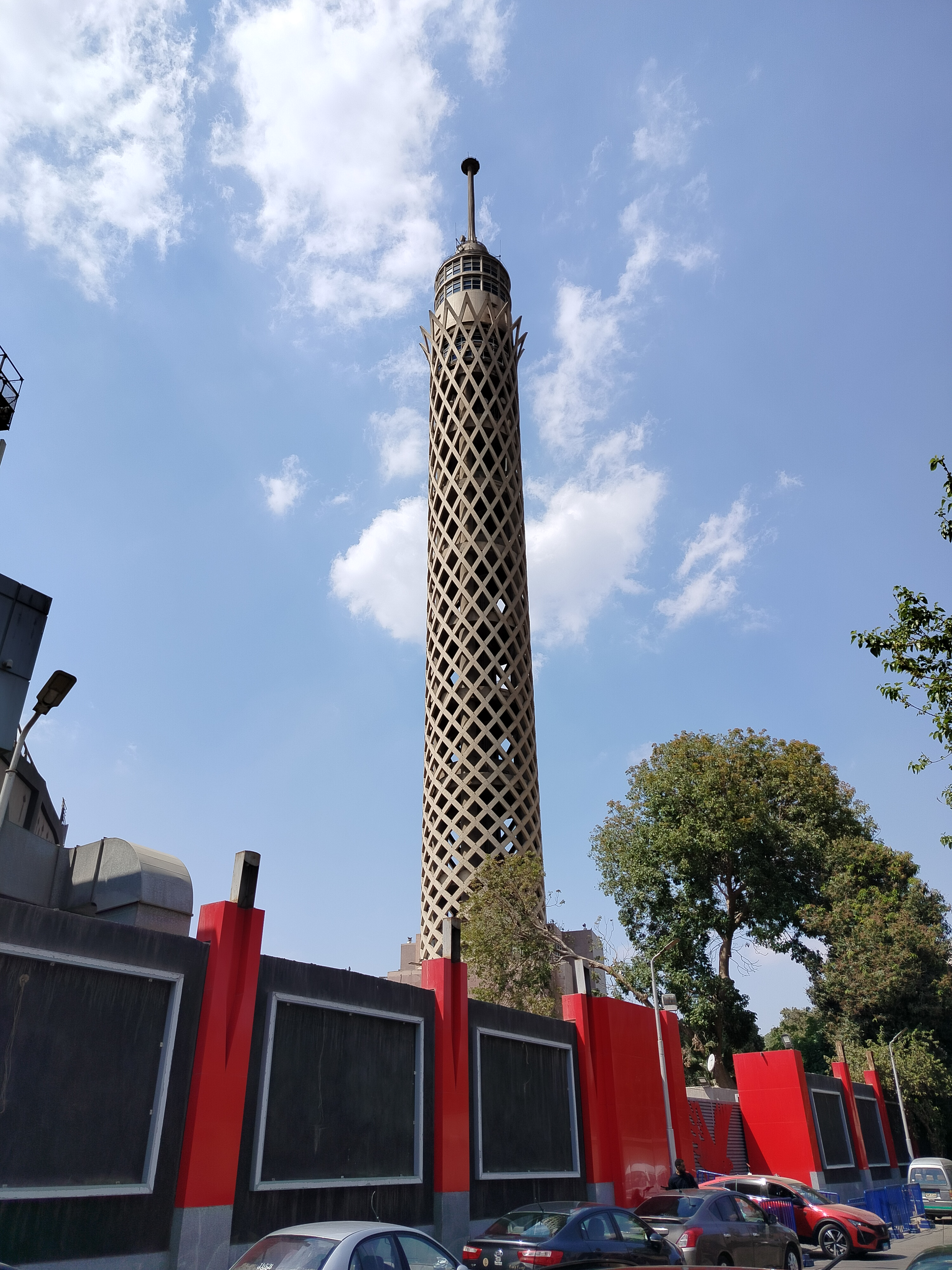
View of the Cairo Tower from the nearby Mokhtar El-Tetsh Stadium in 2025

== Gallery ==
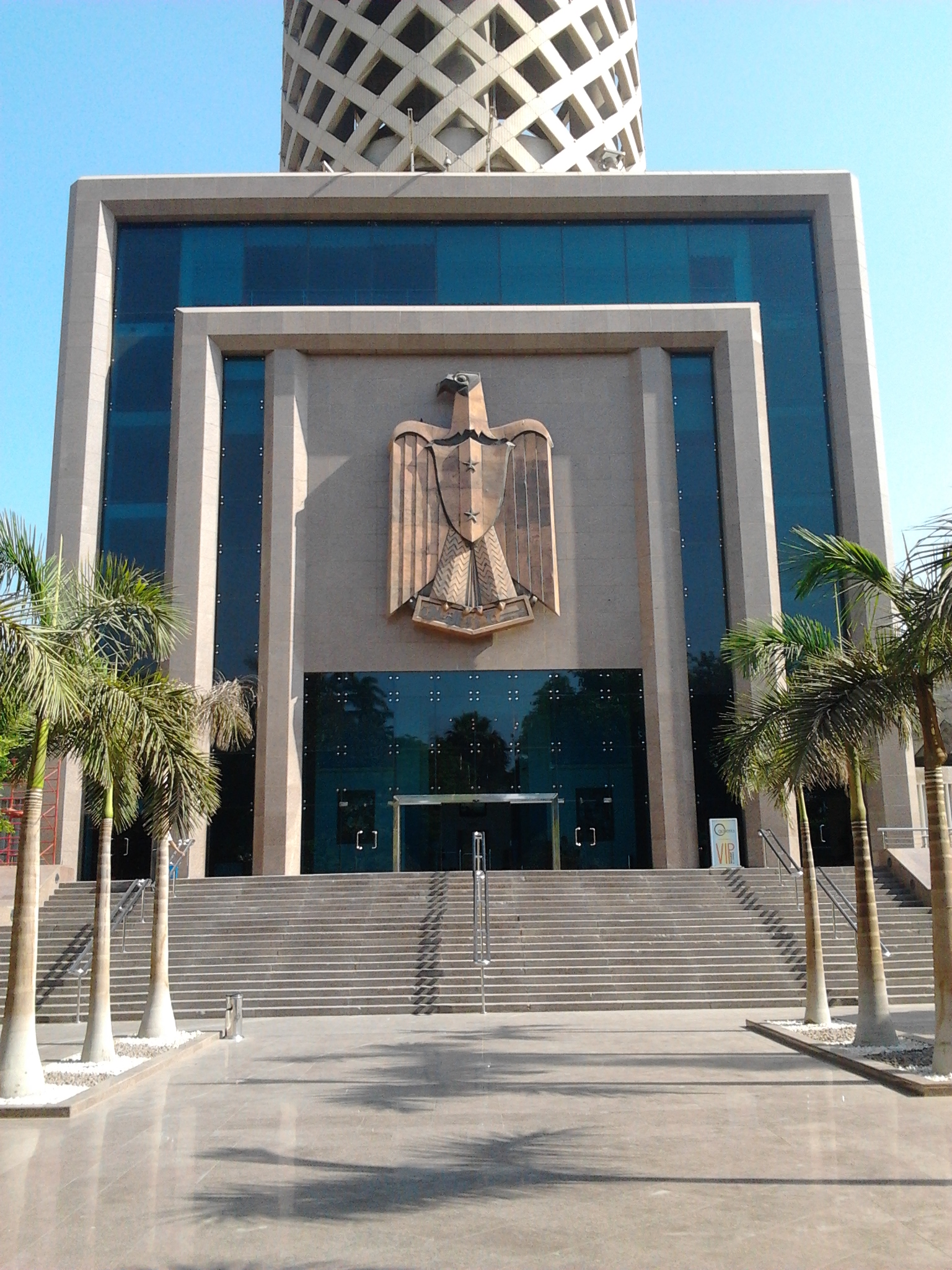
Cairo Tower entrance

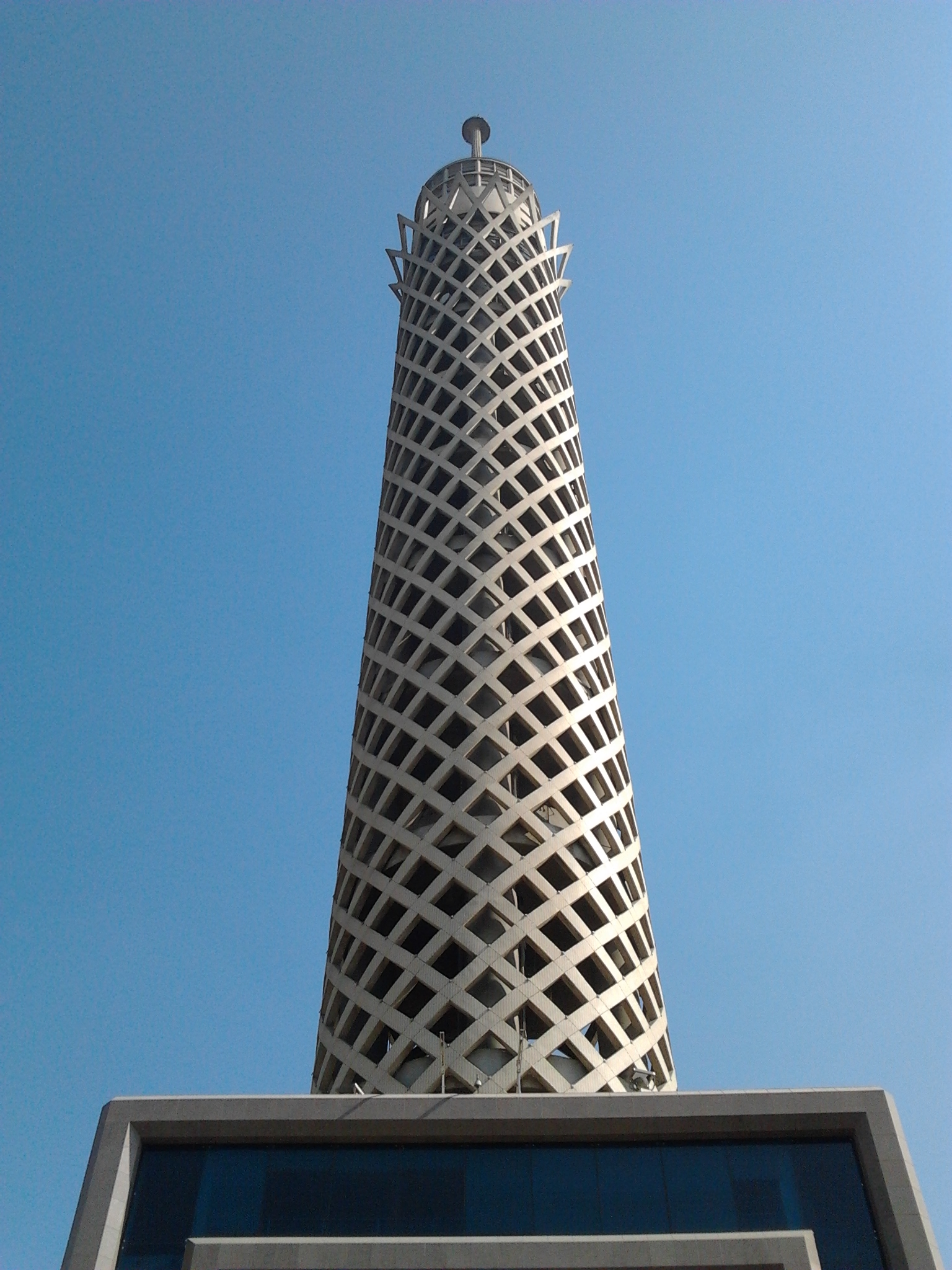
Cairo Tower from below

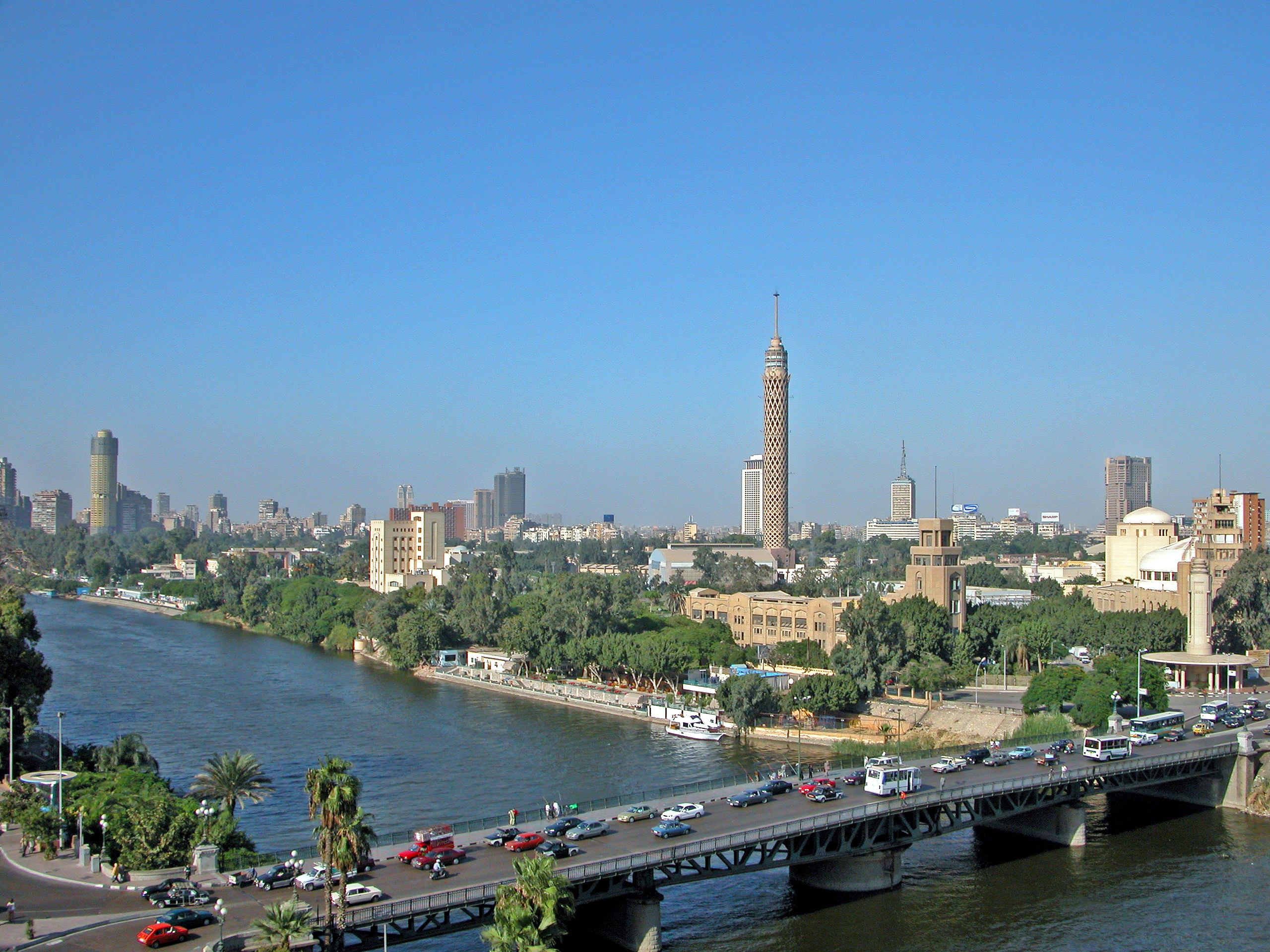
Cairo Tower

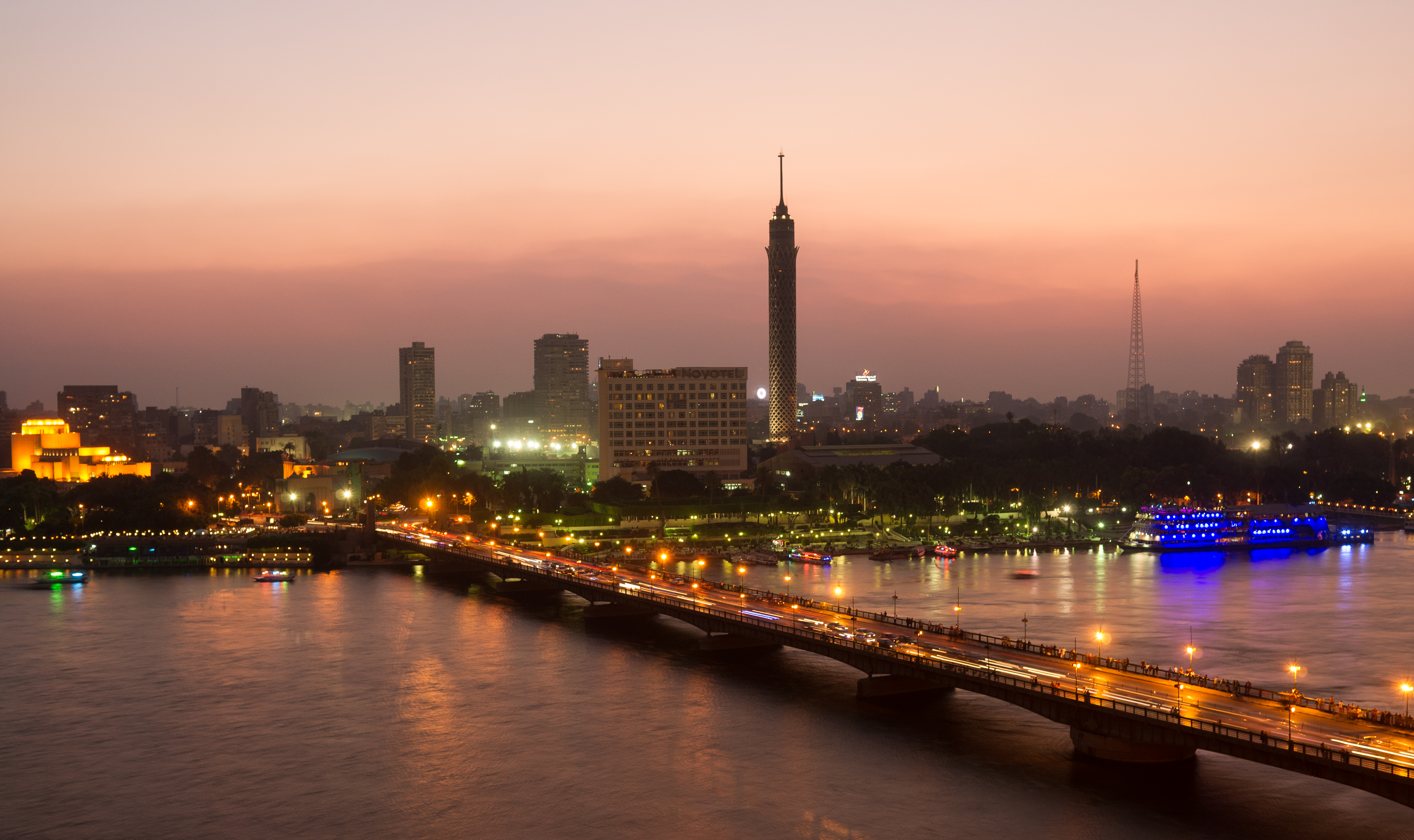
Cairo Tower at sunset

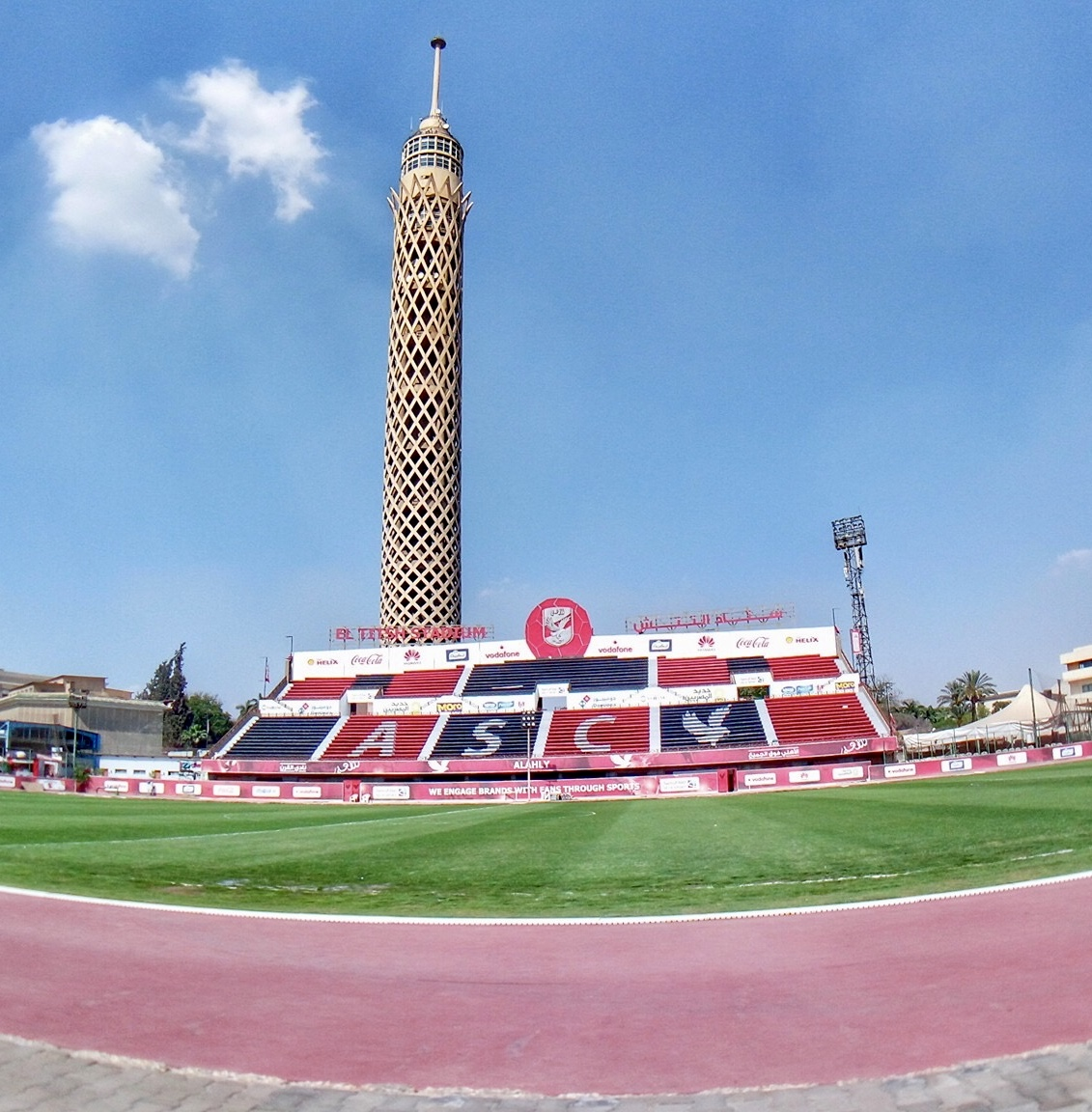
Cairo Tower from El tetsh stadium

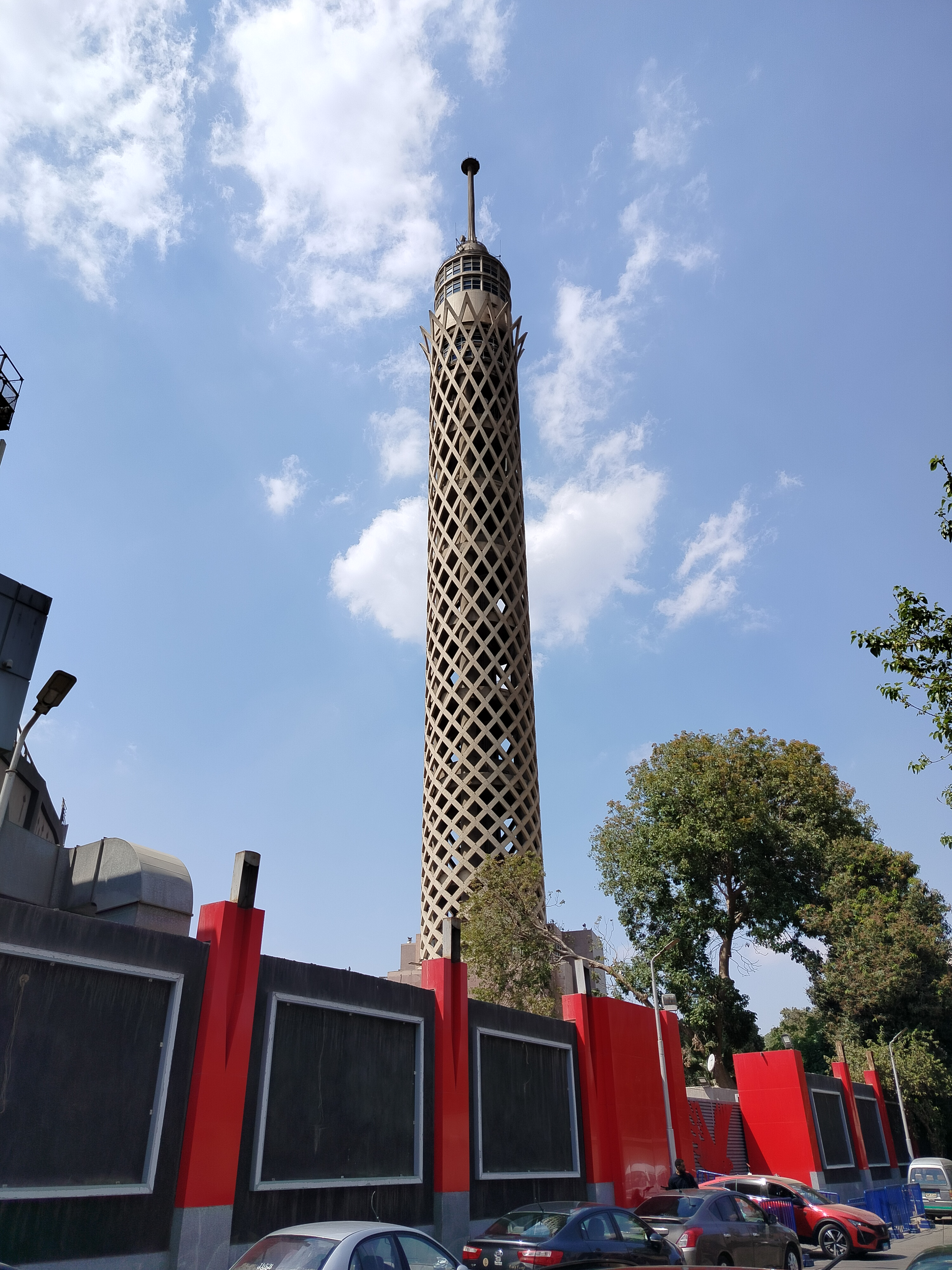
Cairo Tower in 2025

== See also ==
- List of tallest buildings in Cairo
- List of tallest buildings and structures in Egypt
- List of tallest structures in the Middle East
- List of tallest structures in the world by country
- List of tallest freestanding structures
- List of tallest towers in the world
- List of revolving restaurants

Records
Preceded by Great Pyramid of Giza	Tallest free-standing structure in Egypt; 187 m (613.5 ft); 1961 – 2021	Succeeded by Iconic Tower
Preceded by Great Pyramid of Giza	Tallest structure in Egypt; 187 m (613.5 ft); 1961 – 1998	Succeeded by Suez Canal overhead powerline crossing
Preceded by Great Pyramid of Giza	Tallest free-standing structure in North Africa; 187 m (613.5 ft); 1961 – 2019	Succeeded by Djamaa el Djazaïr
Preceded by Great Pyramid of Giza	Tallest structure in North Africa; 187 m (613.5 ft); 1961 – 1982	Succeeded by Nador transmitter
Preceded by Great Pyramid of Giza	Tallest structure in Africa; 187 m (613.5 ft); 1961 – 1962	Succeeded by Albert Hertzog Tower
Unknown	Tallest telecommunications tower in Africa; 187 m (613.5 ft); 1961 – 1962	Succeeded by Albert Hertzog Tower
