= Iconic Tower (Egypt) =

Tallest building in Africa

- البرج الأيقوني
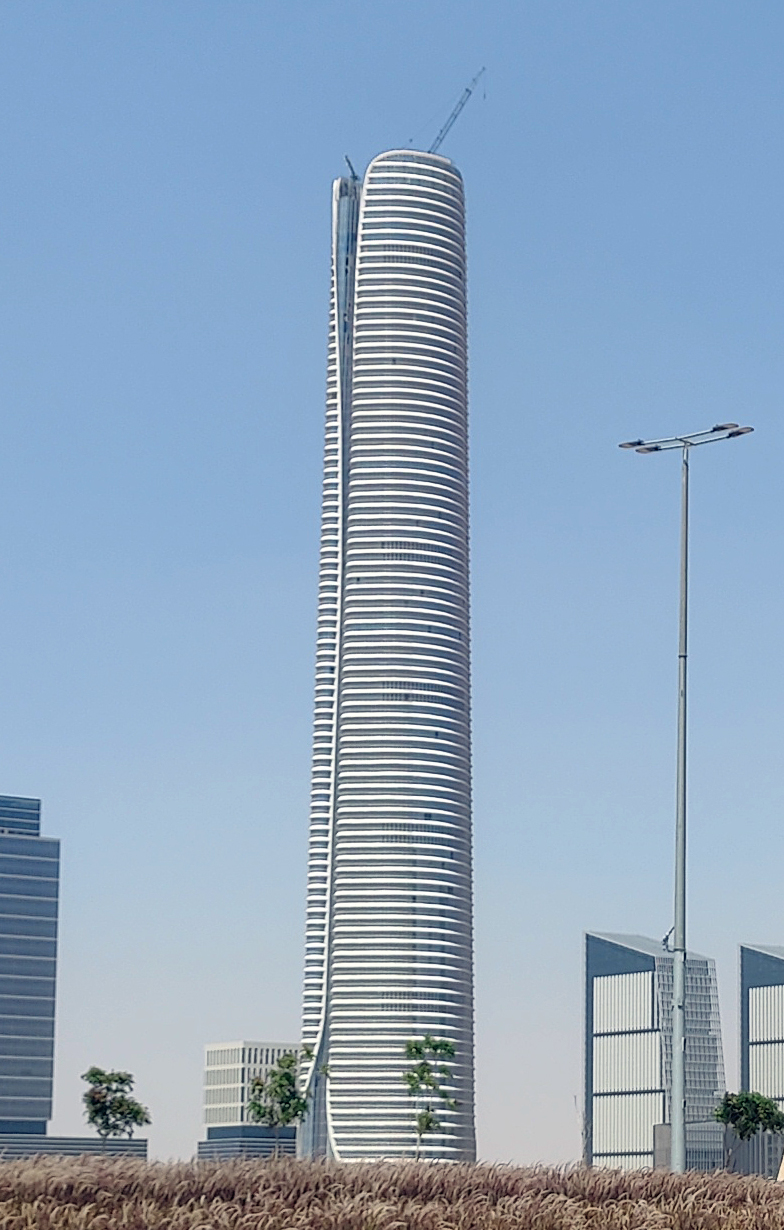

Record height
- Tallest in Africa since 2024^{[I]}
- Preceded by: Djamaa el Djazaïr

General information
- Status: Completed
- Type: Mixed-use, Residential, Office, Hotel
- Architectural style: Egyptian and modern
- Location: The New Capital, Egypt
- Coordinates: 30°0′46″N 31°41′38″E
- Construction started: May 2, 2018
- Completed: 2024

Height
- Architectural: 1,293 ft (394 m)

Technical details
- Floor count: 77
- Floor area: 265,000 m^{2} (2,850,000 sq ft)

Design and construction
- Architect: Dar al-Handasah Shair & Partners
- Developer: CSCE Corporation

Website
- ipgegypt.com/en/projects/300-central-iconic-tower-new-capital

The Iconic Tower is a mixed-use supertall skyscraper in The New Capital of Egypt. With a total structural height of 394 metres (1,293 ft), it is both the tallest building and the tallest structure in Africa. It has 77 floors, mostly for office use, and is one of 20 towers being built as part of the central business district in the new capital city. The total area of the tower exceeds 265,000 m^{2} (2,850,000 sq ft).

== Construction ==
The land excavation work of the Iconic Tower officially began in May 2018. On February 25, 2019, a ceremony that marked the start of concrete pouring operations on the foundations was held at the site. It was also widely reported that the event was attended by Egyptian Prime Minister Mostafa Madbouly. CSCE is the main contractor for the project that helped employ over 5,000 Egyptian workers.

The tower project's architect of record is Dar al-Handasah Shair & Partners. The overall plan for the new Cairo development project, led by the Egyptian Ministry of Housing, includes 20 high-rises in the complex surrounding Iconic Tower.

It was planned and inspired by the shape of a pharaonic obelisk, with the glass exterior representing the Egyptian god Amun’s Shuti crown.

In July 2021, all structural concrete work was completed for the tower and on 24 August 2021, the tower topped out at its full height of 394 metres (1,293 ft), becoming the tallest structure in Africa. Construction of the Iconic Tower was completed in 2024, at which point it officially overtook the Great Mosque of Algiers Tower in Algeria as the tallest building in Africa.

== See also ==
- List of tallest buildings and structures in Egypt
- List of tallest buildings in Africa
- List of tallest buildings
- List of future tallest buildings

Records
Preceded by Great Mosque of Algiers Tower	Tallest building in Africa; 394 m (1,292 ft); 2024 – present	Incumbent
Preceded by The Leonardo	Building in Africa with the most floors 77; 2024 – present	Incumbent
Preceded by Ministry of Foreign Affairs	Tallest building in Egypt; 394 m (1,292 ft); 2024 – present	Incumbent
Preceded by Building D01	Tallest building in the New Administrative Capital; 394 m (1,292 ft); 2024 – present	Incumbent
Preceded by Hillbrow Tower	Tallest tower in Africa; 394 m (1,292 ft); 2021 – present	Incumbent
Preceded by Chimney of Sasol III Steam Plant	Tallest free-standing structure in Africa; 394 m (1,292 ft); 2021 – 2026	Succeeded by Tour F
Preceded by Nador transmitter	Tallest structure in Africa; 394 m (1,292 ft); 2021 – 2026	Succeeded by Tour F
Preceded by Great Mosque of Algiers Tower	Tallest free-standing structure in North Africa; 394 m (1,292 ft); 2021 – present	Incumbent
Preceded by Nador transmitter	Tallest structure in North Africa; 394 m (1,292 ft); 2021 – present	Incumbent
Preceded by Cairo Tower	Tallest free-standing structure in Egypt; 394 m (1,292 ft); 2021 – present	Incumbent
Preceded by Suez Canal overhead powerline crossing	Tallest structure in Egypt; 394 m (1,292 ft); 2021 – present	Incumbent
