= Nador transmitter =

Radio infrastructure in Morocco

Nador transmitter, Mast 1

General information
- Status: Demolished
- Type: Mast radiator
- Location: Nador, Morocco
- Coordinates: 35°2′50″N 2°55′22″W
- Opened: 1980
- Demolished: 28 October 2026

Height
- Height: 380 m (1,250 ft)

Design and construction
- Main contractor: Medi 1

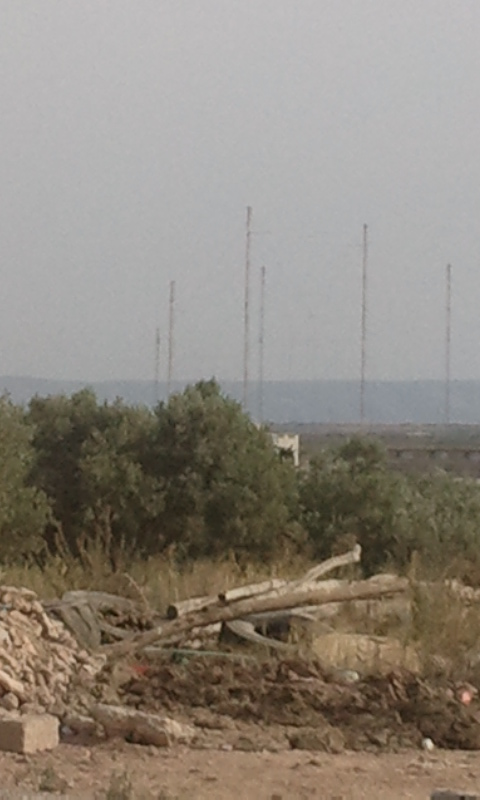
Shortwave antennas of the Nador transmitter

Nador transmitter, Mast 2

General information
- Status: Demolished
- Type: Mast radiator
- Location: Nador, Morocco
- Coordinates: 35°2′30″N 2°55′16″W
- Opened: 1980
- Demolished: 28 October 2026

Height
- Height: 380 m (1,250 ft)

Design and construction
- Main contractor: Medi 1

Nador transmitter, Mast 3

General information
- Status: Demolished
- Type: Mast radiator
- Location: Nador, Morocco
- Coordinates: 35°2′9″N 2°55′9″W
- Opened: 1980
- Demolished: 28 October 2026

Height
- Height: 380 m (1,250 ft)

Design and construction
- Main contractor: Medi 1

Nador transmitter is the main transmission facility for longwave and shortwave of Medi 1 Radio, a privately owned broadcasting company of Morocco. It is situated approximately 18 kilometres south of the city of Nador and a few kilometres south of Selouane at 35°2'29"N and 2°55'7"W.

The longwave transmitter of the Nador facility, which works at 171 kHz, had originally a transmission power of 2000 kilowatts. After 2009 the original equipment had been replaced by a new set of Thomson Broadcast S7HP solid-state transmitters with an output of 1600 kW. This modernization project incorporated a refurbishment of the three guyed masts, each 380 metres tall, thus the tallest structures in Africa after the demolition of the OMEGA Navigation System in Paynesville, Liberia in 2011.

In addition the Nador facility is also equipped with two Thomson 250 kW shortwave transmitters. One of these transmitters carried the main program of Morocco's state broadcaster SNRT on varying frequencies around 15345 kHz until it ceased in September 2012. The other transmitter was used for Medi 1 on 9575 kHz, but has been silent since May 2017. On 10 September 2026, the 171 kHz transmitter was shut down forever. On 28 October 2026, the three longwave masts were demolished by controlled explosion.

== Sources and references ==
Records
Preceded by JG Strijdom Tower	Tallest structure in Africa; 380 m (1,250 ft); 1982 – 2021	Succeeded by Iconic Tower
Preceded by Cairo Tower	Tallest structure in North Africa; 380 m (1,250 ft); 1982 – 2021	Succeeded by Iconic Tower
