= Secunda CTL =

Synthetic fuel plant in South Africa

Coordinates: 26°33′13.3″S 29°09′56.7″E

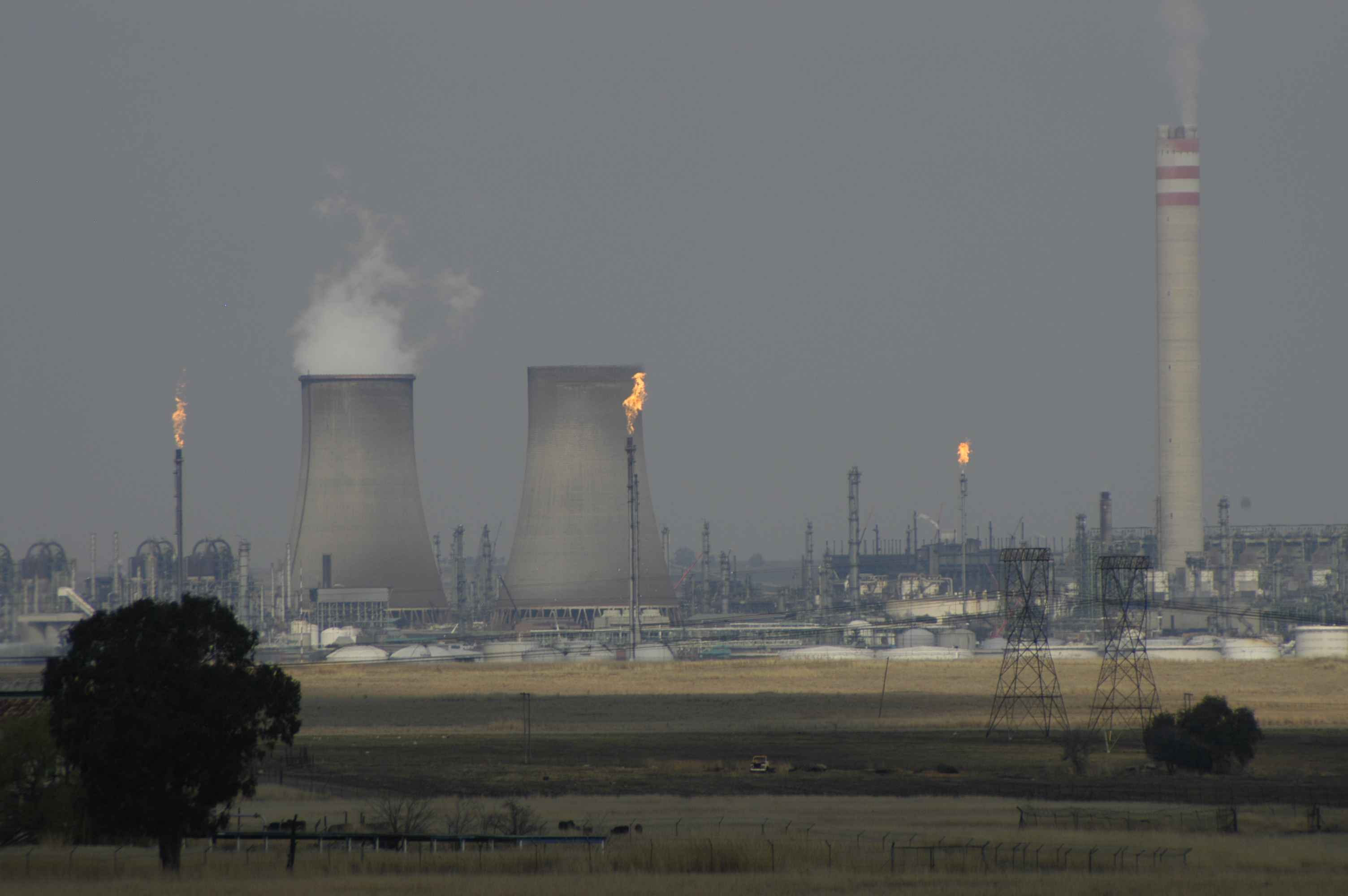

Secunda CTL is a synthetic fuel plant owned by Sasol at Secunda, Mpumalanga in South Africa. It uses coal liquefaction to produce petroleum-like synthetic crude oil from coal. The process used by Sasol is based on the Fischer–Tropsch process. It is the largest coal liquefaction plant in the world.

Secunda CTL consists of two production units. The Sasol II unit was constructed in 1980 and the Sasol III unit in 1984. It has total production capacity of 160,000 barrels per day (25,000 m^{3}/d).

== Greenhouse gas emissions ==
As of 2020 it is the world's largest single emitter of greenhouse gas, at 56.5 million tonnes CO_{2} a year. However, if Afşin-Elbistan C power station in Turkey is built and operated at planned capacity it would emit over 60 million tonnes a year, though this project was stopped on the grounds of possible soil and air pollution.

Air Liquide acquired the 42,000 tons/day oxygen production in 2020, with plans for 900 MW power plants to reduce CO_{2} emissions.

== Unique plant infrastructure ==
The Sasol III Steam Plant has a 301 m (988 ft) tall chimney built by Concor, which consists of a 292 m (958 ft) high windshield and four 300 m (980 ft) reinforced concrete flues which together with a 1 m (3.3 ft) high temporary roof on the 4th flue make it the tenth tallest structure, and the second tallest free-standing structure in Africa. It remains the tallest structure in South Africa, and the tallest free-standing structure in sub-Saharan Africa.

== In Media ==
As a major component of South Africa's economy, Secunda was in turn a major target of the African National Congress during the apartheid era. Two ANC attacks (and their aftermath) were dramatized in the 2006 film Catch a Fire.

== See also ==
- Sasol
- Coal gasification

Records
Preceded by JG Strijdom Tower	Tallest structure in South Africa; Chimney of Sasol III: 301 m (988 ft); 1984 – present	Incumbent
Preceded by JG Strijdom Tower	Tallest free-standing structure in Africa; Chimney of Sasol III: 301 m (988 ft); 1984 – 2021	Succeeded by Iconic Tower
