= Brixton, Johannesburg =

Brixton POI
- Interactive map of Brixton POI
- Coordinates: 26°11′36.4″S 28°0′09.6″E
- Country: South Africa
- Province: Gauteng
- Municipality: City of Johannesburg
- Main Place: Johannesburg
- Established: 1902

Area
  - Total: 0.56 km^{2} (0.22 sq mi)

Population (2011)
  - Total: 4,067
  - Density: 7,300/km^{2} (19,000/sq mi)

Racial makeup (2011)
  - Black African: 75.2%
  - Coloured: 7.5%
  - Indian/Asian: 6.7%
  - White: 9.2%
  - Other: 1.4%

First languages (2011)
  - English: 26.4%
  - Zulu: 12.8%
  - Tswana: 12.8%
  - Afrikaans: 10.0%
  - Other: 38.0%
- Time zone: UTC+2 (SAST)
- Postal code (street): 2092
- PO box: 2019

Brixton is a predominantly working class suburb of Johannesburg, South Africa. It is the site of the landmark Sentech Tower, and is near the suburbs of Auckland Park and Melville.

== History ==
The suburb of Brixton was first surveyed in 1902 from a portion of the farm Braamfontein. The suburb was named after the Brixton suburb in London with many of the area's streets taking their names from districts in the British capital. The ridge on which the area was developed in the early 20th century offers a panoramic view of most surrounding areas of Johannesburg. Brixton consists of wide, neat streets containing some 980 houses, many of which are traditional semi-detached homes with low set walls.

== Architecture ==
The suburb possesses several distinctive churches, with one having been built by Sir Herbert Baker and Frank Fleming. A few Brixton houses have been declared provincial heritage sites.

The area also features one of the largest cemeteries in Johannesburg. Laid out in 1912, Brixton Cemetery has a historic Hindu crematorium which was organised by Mahatma Gandhi shortly before his departure from South Africa in 1914.

The commanding Sentech Tower overlooks the area. Built in 1962, the tower is used for broadcasting television and radio stations across the country. The tower once featured a restaurant at its top, but this was closed in 1982 due to political tensions.

=== Kingston Frost Park ===
The area is also home to the Kingston Frost Park. Originally called the Brixton Park when it was laid out in 1925, the park was renamed the Kingston Frost Park in 1939 in honor of the Johannesburg city councillor, AC Kingston Frost. Visitors to the park are greeted with a tall beacon commemorating those who died in World War I.

In recent years, local residents have taken it upon themselves to actively maintain, clean, and finance the upkeep of the park, as part of an initiative led by local actress and cabaret artist Elzabé Zietsman.

== Gentrification ==
Due to the diversity of the residents, the people of Brixton are establishing a tradition of community building and upliftment projects to unify and connect its inhabitants.

The suburb is composed of artists, architects, students, celebrities and immigrants from across Africa with people of varying faiths and cultures living side by side.

Initiatives such as The Brixton Light Festival, a free open air market and performance space created by members of the community, as well as Shade Kids Saturday Art Classes, that provide creative outlets and often, meals for the children of Brixton, have done much to bolster the social cohesion of the district.

Brixton is home to the South African National Youth Orchestra headquarters, as well as the legendary Hugenote Amateur Boxing Club, established by "Naas Botes in 1961 and has produced regional, provincial and national champions, as well as Springbok boxers."

The image of the Brixton Central Business District is still perceived as negative, the area's disheveled High Street stores are in need of business investors and the parking remains scarce. However, with its close proximity to two prominent universities, population and low property and rental prices, investment in the area may prove to be profitable.

Brixton has traditionally been a working class suburb, but has seen an influx of a few professionals in recent years. The area's low property prices and the ridge's panoramic views have attracted new residents to the area although there are many areas that are perceived as dilapidated and overcrowded. There is also a large, ever growing student population, which attend the nearby University of the Witwatersrand and University of Johannesburg. These students may prove to be a lucrative market that some African finance consultants suggest still remains untapped.
