= Tour F =

Skyscraper in Abidjan, Côte d'Ivoire

Coordinates: 5.33558°N 4.02222°W

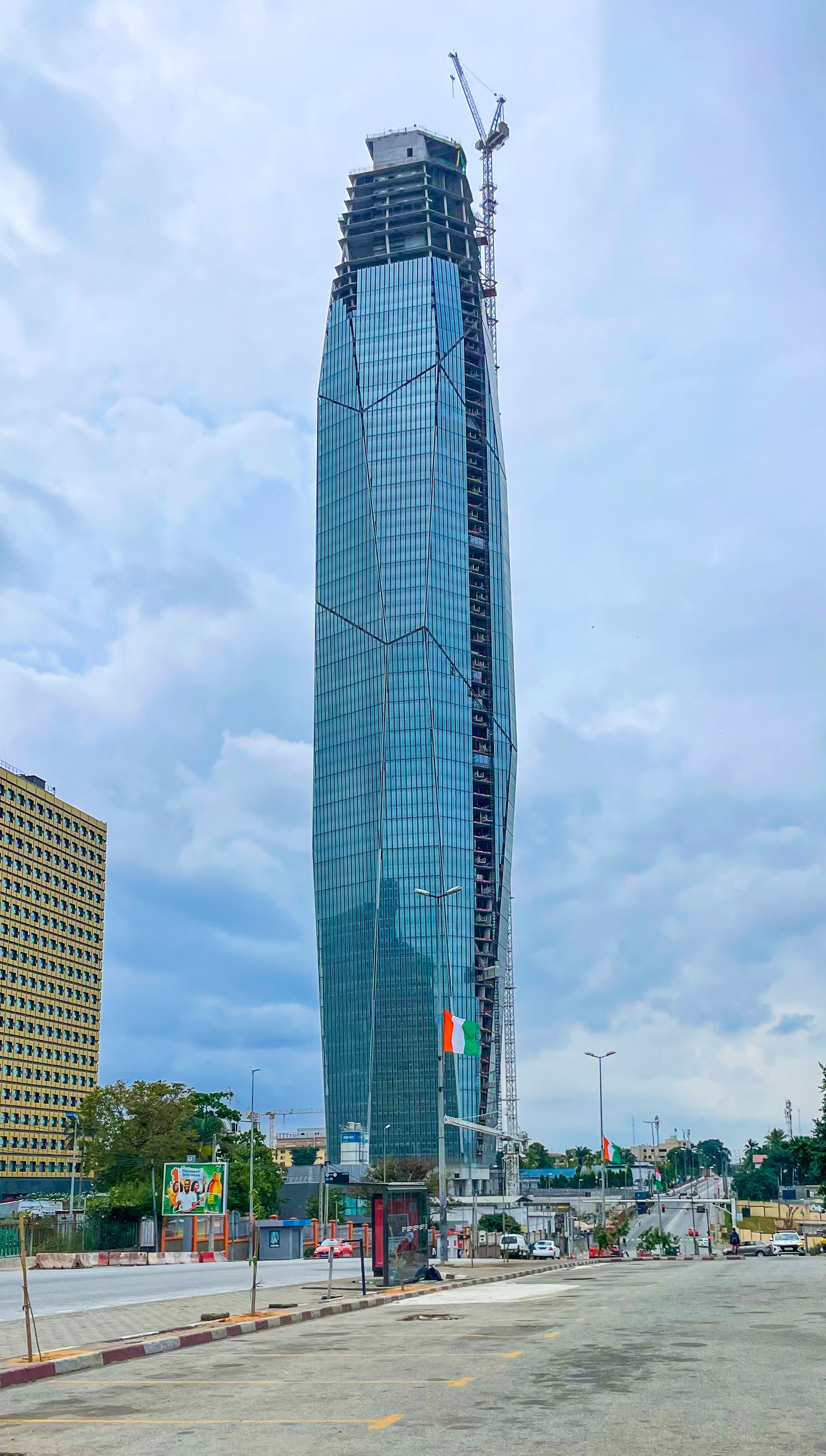

General information
- Status: Under construction
- Type: Office
- Location: Avenue Guy Nairay 32, Abidjan, Côte d'Ivoire
- Construction started: 2021
- Completed: 2026

Height
- Roof: 421 m (1,381 ft)

Technical details
- Structural system: Reinforced concrete
- Floor count: 75

Design and construction
- Architect: Pierre Fakhoury
- Developer: PFO Africa
- Main contractor: Besix

Tour F (English: Tower F) is a supertall office skyscraper under construction in Abidjan, Ivory Coast. Started in 2021 and expected to be completed in 2026, it will stand at 421 metres (1,381 ft) tall with 75 floors and will surpass the Iconic Tower in Egypt's The New Capital to become the tallest building in Africa.

== History ==
The skyscraper will be used as an office building. It is intended to consolidate government agencies, currently scattered throughout the city, by housing various ministries and administrative units. The developer is the Ivorian Ministry of Construction, Housing and Urban Planning, which is collaborating with the local construction company PFO Africa on the development and financing. Tour F was designed by the Lebanese-Ivorian architect Pierre Fakhoury. Completion is scheduled for 2026.

=== Construction ===
The idea for a sixth administrative building originated in the 1970s. At that time, Tour F was included in a comprehensive urban development plan and was intended to complement the five existing towers of the administrative complex (A to E). However, the project remained unbuilt for decades. In 2016, a new planning phase began under the leadership of the state construction authority BNETD and the architect Pierre Fakhoury. The government's aim was to solve the growing space problem of the ministries with a single, very tall building, while simultaneously making optimal use of the expensive urban land through vertical development.

In July 2021, the Belgian construction company Besix was awarded the contract to manage the construction site and carry out the foundation and structural work. This followed the Ministry's strategy of combining international engineering firms with local partners; PFO Africa is the project developer and responsible for the design. Construction began that same month using the existing foundations. According to PFO Africa, Tour F will double the office and parking capacity of the administrative city and will have approximately 140,000 square meters of gross floor area. The construction costs are estimated at approximately €450 million.

=== Structure ===
The high-rise building is designed as a slender, multifaceted sculpture, its floor plan tapering from a rectangular base to a polygonal tower. The faceted form, with two symmetrical main faces, is reminiscent of a stylized African mask; the vertically elongated structure tilts slightly inwards towards the top and terminates in a horizontally truncated point. A glass "lantern," a structure approximately 30 meters high, sits atop this point, intended to be publicly accessible and offering a 360-degree view of Abidjan and the Ébrié Lagoon. The atrium podium contains reception areas, restaurants, meeting rooms, and a large lecture hall; above this are 76 office floors, served by 21 elevators, two freight elevators, and a panoramic elevator.

The supporting structure consists of a massive reinforced concrete core. To support the approximately 170,000-ton structure, 70 barrette foundations measuring 2.80 × 1.50 meters were drilled 60 to 70 meters deep into the ground and connected to a 3.5-meter-thick foundation slab. The tower's exterior features a double glass facade: the inner shell consists of double-glazed elements with integrated sunshades, while the outer shell, made up of approximately 16,000 glass panels, acts as a brise-soleil and gives the building its characteristic vertical articulation.

The low and high sections of the facade are articulated by horizontal cornices; the polygonal floors become smaller towards the top, making the tower appear more slender. The double-walled facade contributes to energy efficiency.

The superstructure, cast in its entirety, is balanced by a central core. The peripheral columns are inclined along the edges of the outer envelope. Deflection steels at the base of the tower reduce the number of columns and optimize access to the building. The entire tower was analyzed using sophisticated interactive models that incorporate the structure's dynamic properties, including the foundation system's response to wind forces. The BIM (Building Information Modeling) process was used for all studies and the final synthesis.

== Construction chronology ==
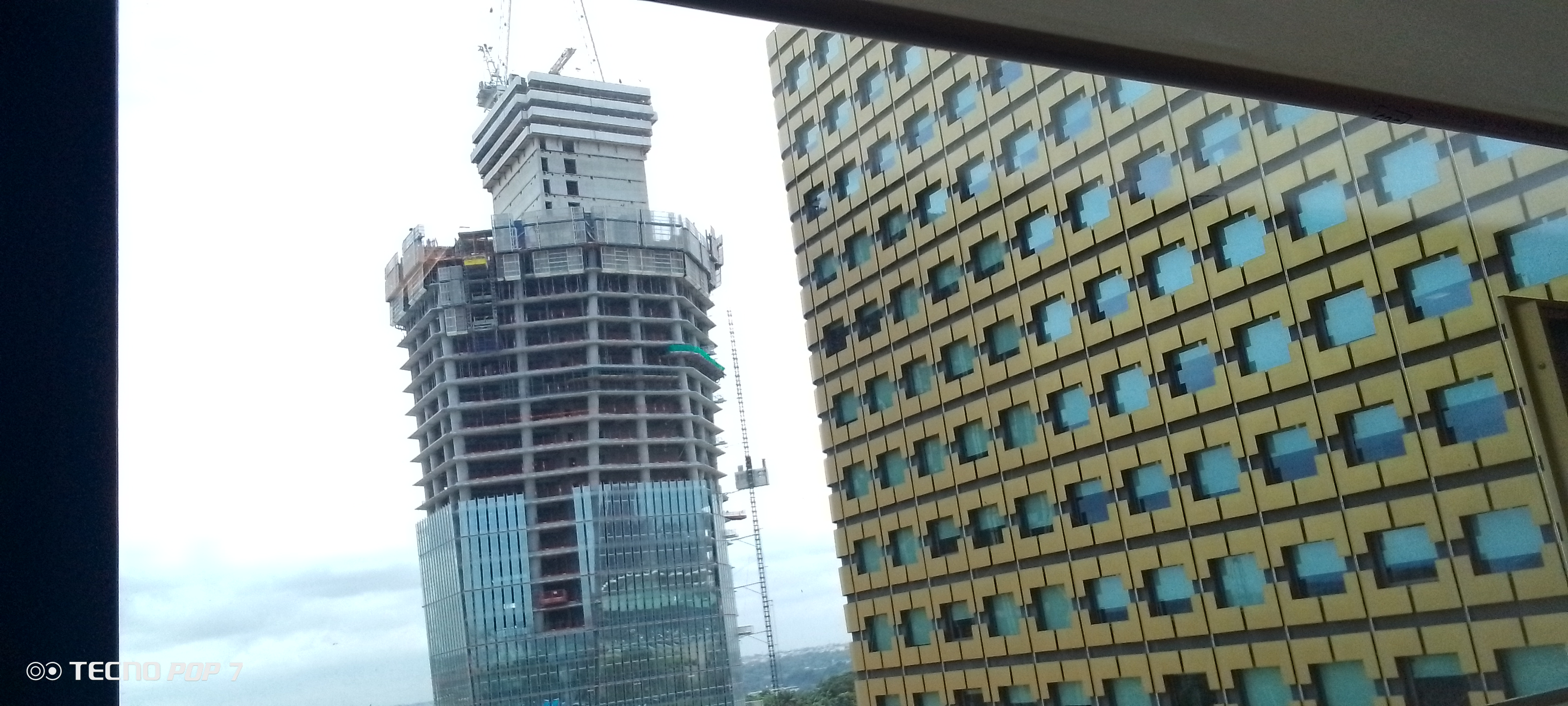
September 2023

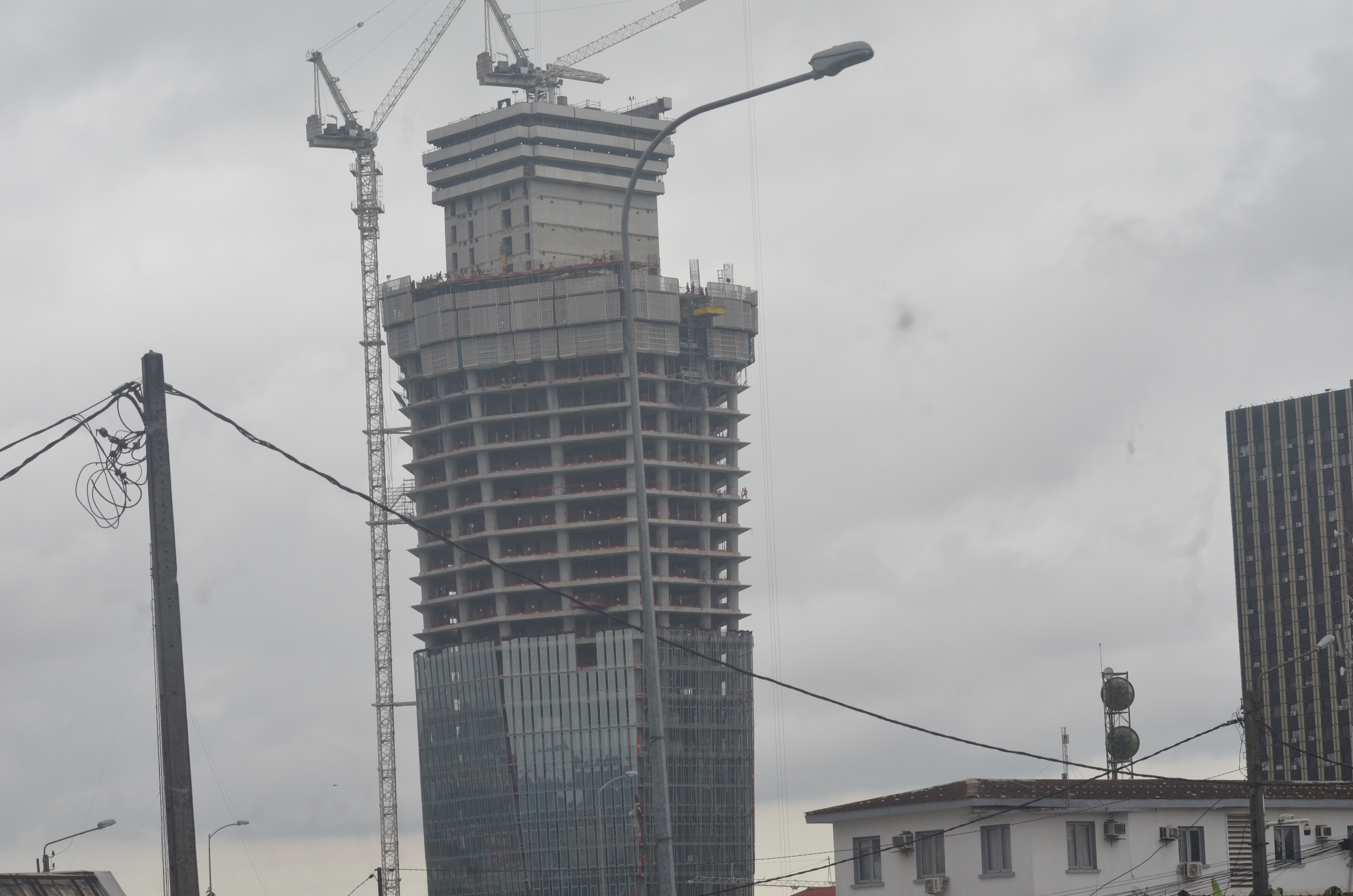
October 2023

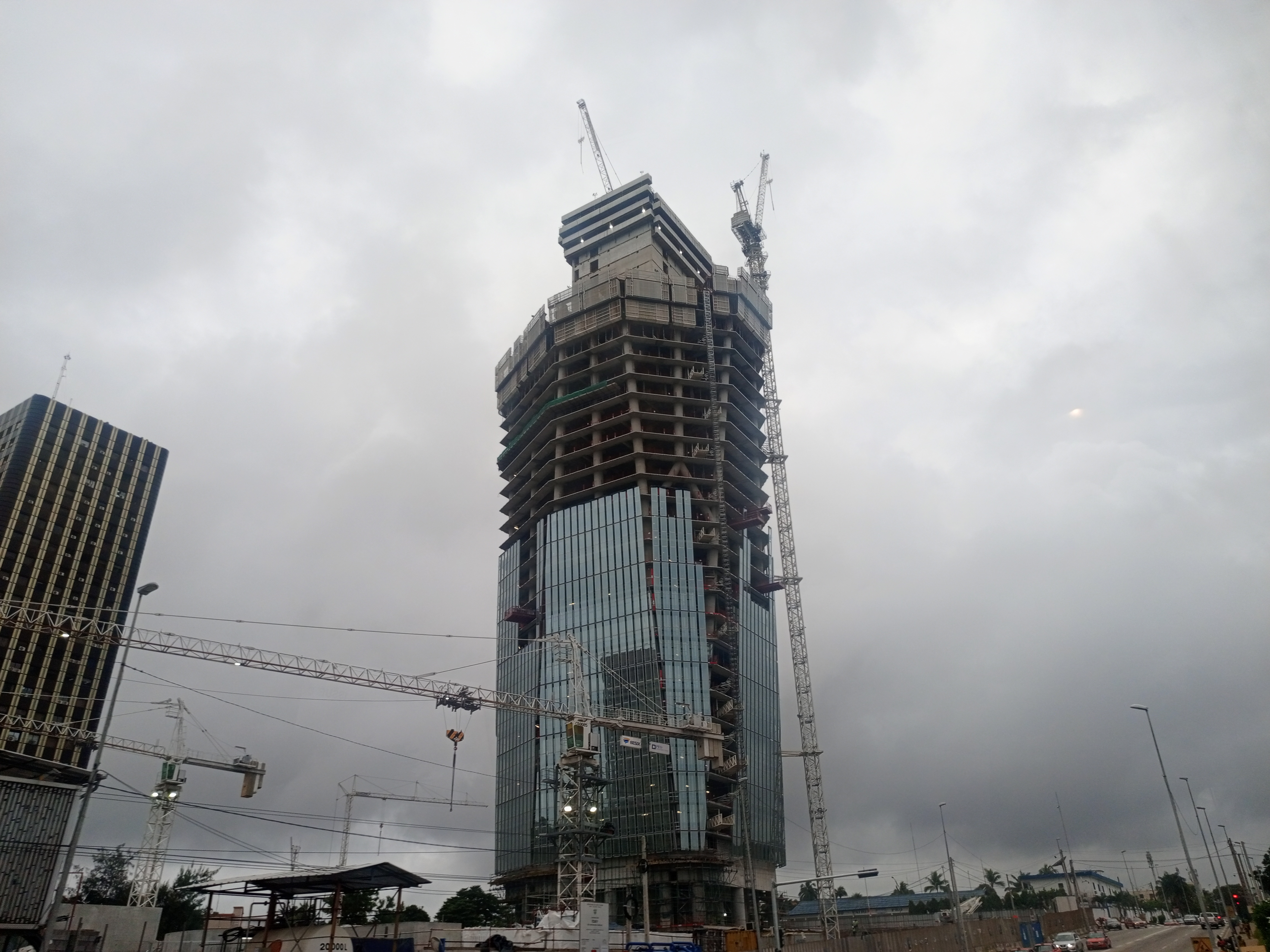
January 2024

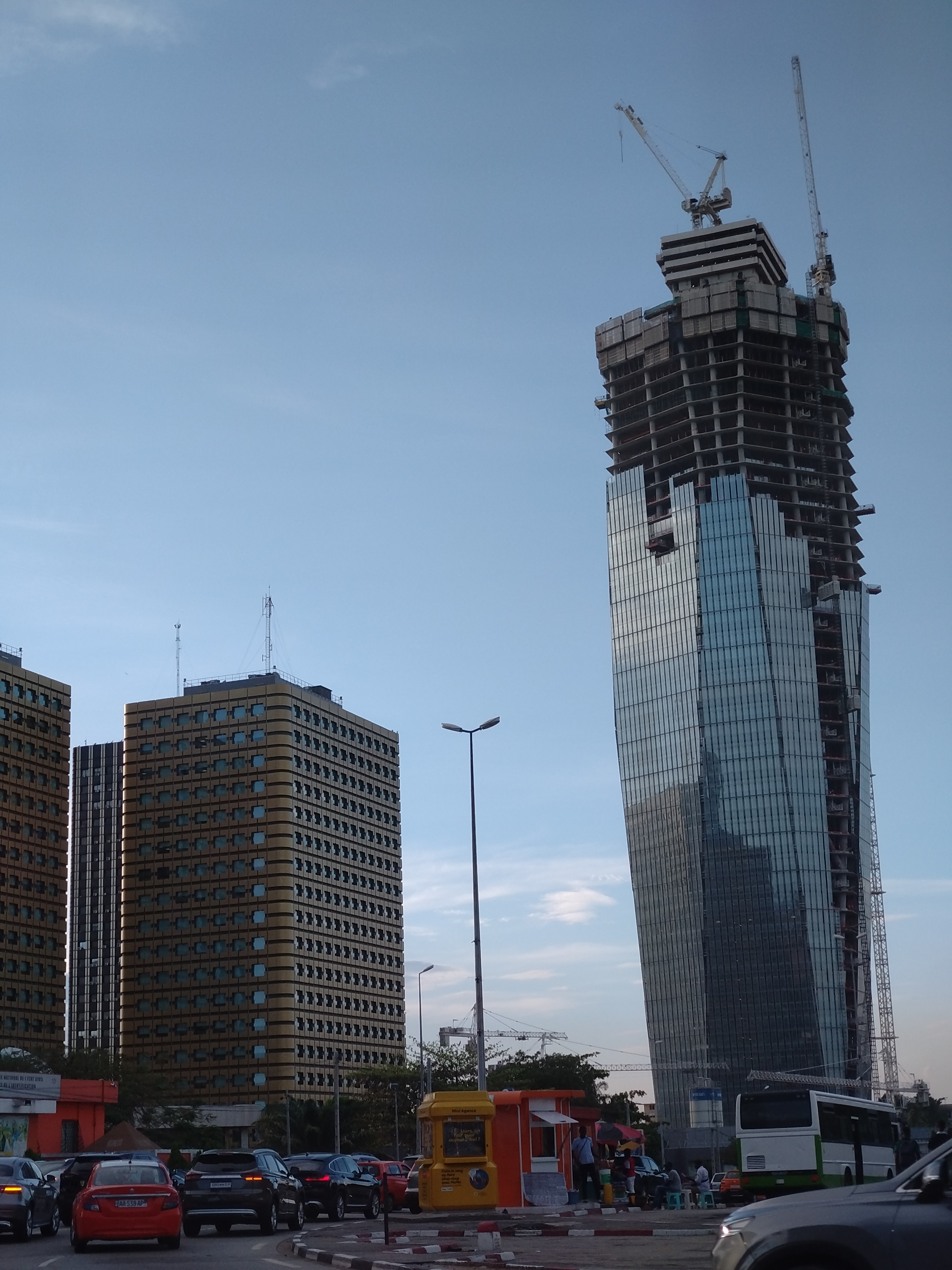
May 2024

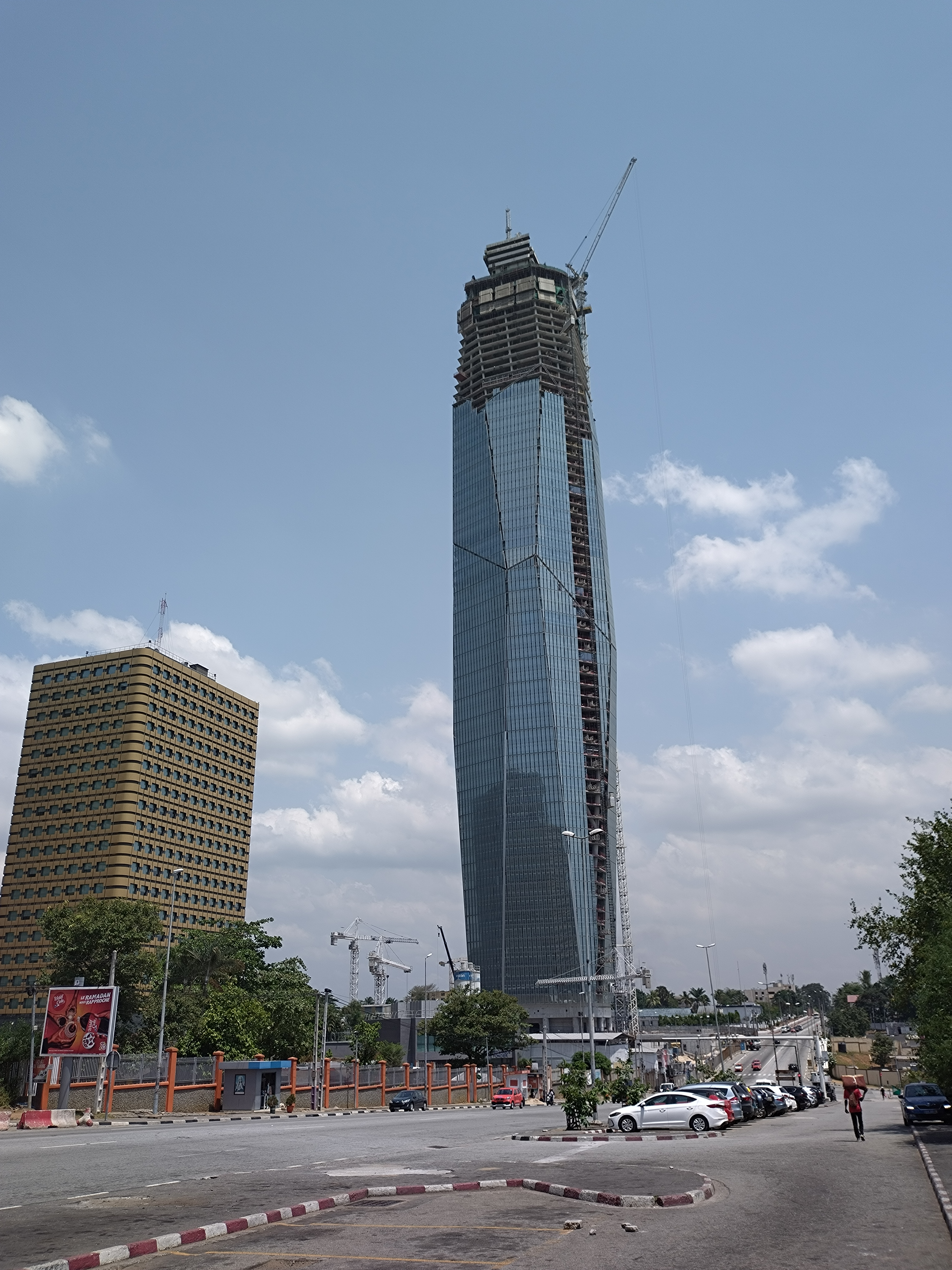
March 2025

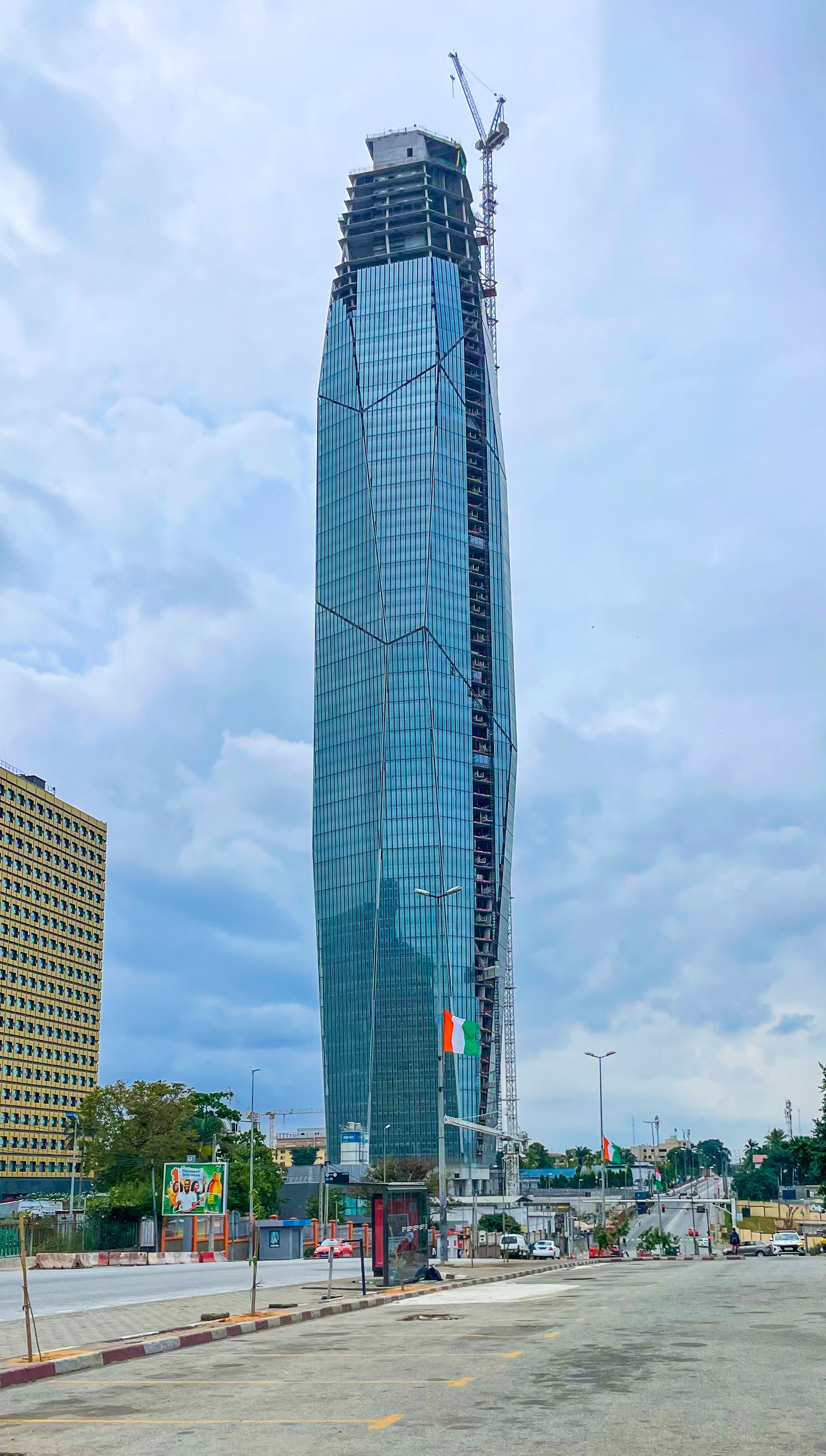
August 2025

== See also ==
- List of tallest buildings in Abidjan
- List of tallest buildings in Africa

Records
| Preceded by Iconic Tower | Tallest free-standing structure in Africa; 421 m (1,381 ft); 2026 – present | Incumbent |
| Preceded by Iconic Tower | Tallest structure in Africa; 421 m (1,391 ft); 2026 – present | Incumbent |
