= South African Reserve Bank Building =

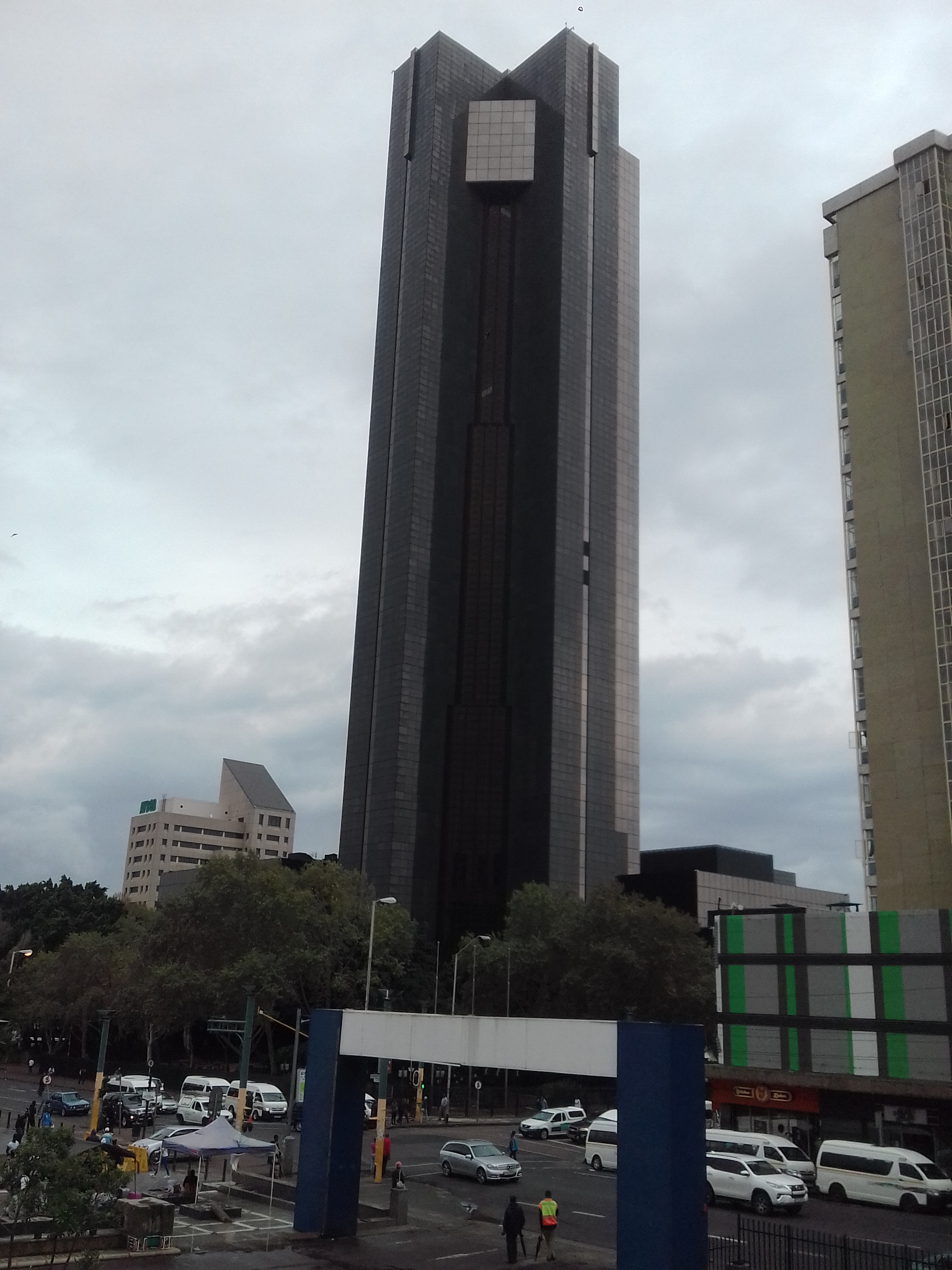
- The South African Reserve Bank Building in 2018
- Interactive map of the South African Reserve Bank Building area

General information
- Location: Pretoria, South Africa
- Coordinates: 25.7452°S 28.1961°E

Height
- Height: 148 metres (486 ft)

Technical details
- Floor count: 38

The South African Reserve Bank Building is a skyscraper in Pretoria, South Africa.

== History ==
Construction of the building, designed by the architecture firm Burg Doherty Bryant + Partners to serve as the new headquarters of the South African Reserve Bank, began in 1986 and was completed in 1988.

The tower's design received the Merit Award from the South African Institute of Architects in 1989 and the Building Merit Award from the South African Property Owners Association in 1988.

== Description ==
The building is located at 370 Church Street in central Pretoria.

The tower features an irregular cross-shaped floor plan, generated by the intersection of orthogonal volumes around a central core. The building reaches a height of 148 metres over 38 floors, making it the tallest skyscraper in the city. The façade is characterised by dark external cladding panels and reflective glass.

== See also ==
- List of tallest buildings in Pretoria
