= Lukasrand =

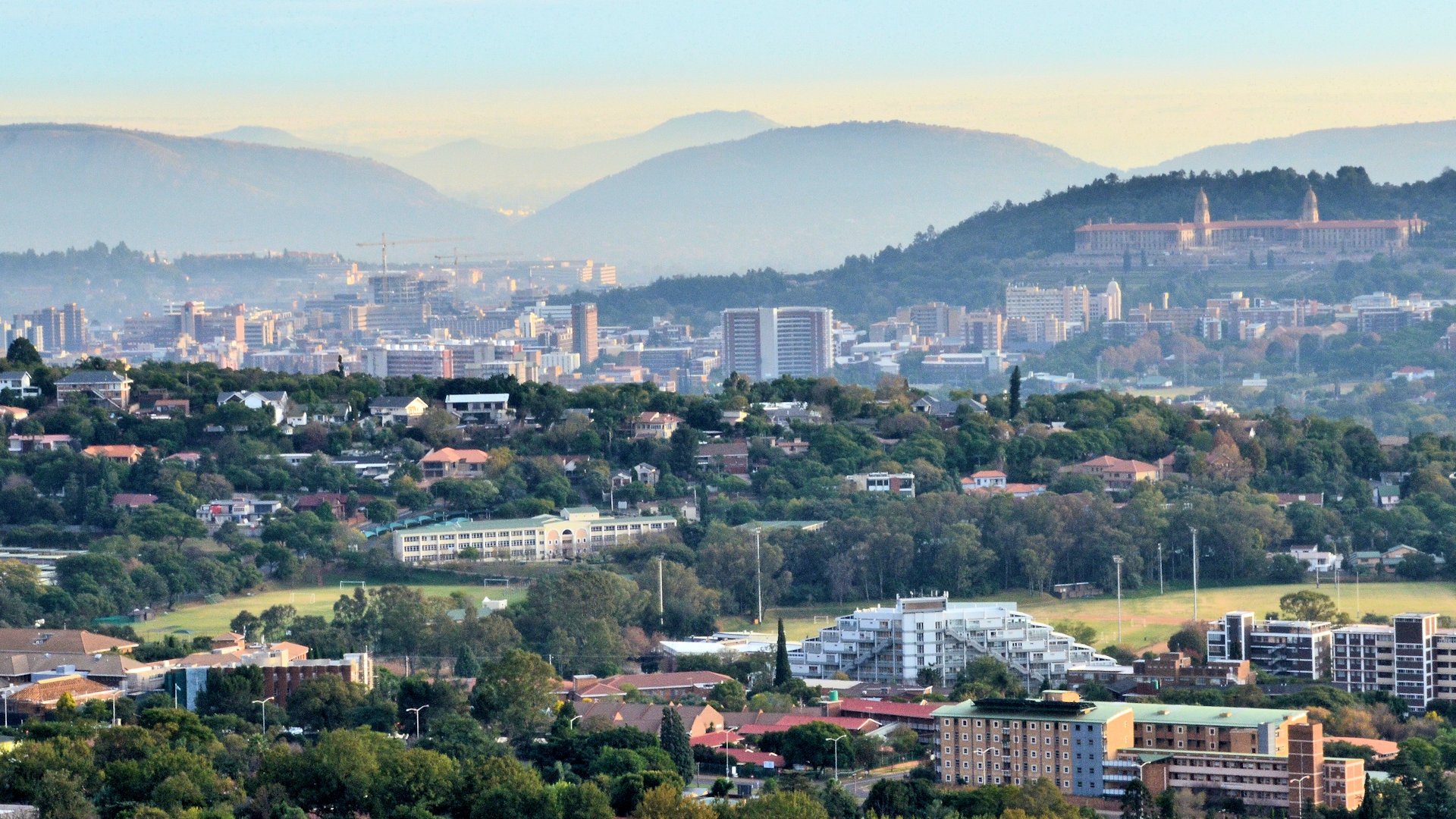
- View over Lukasrand

- Location within Gauteng Location within South Africa
- Coordinates: 25°45′58″S 28°12′20″E
- Country: South Africa
- Province: Gauteng
- Municipality: City of Tshwane
- Established: 1961

Area
  - Total: 0.37 km^{2} (0.14 sq mi)

Population (2011)
  - Total: 439
  - Density: 1,200/km^{2} (3,100/sq mi)
- Time zone: UTC+2 (SAST)
- Postal code (street): 0181
- Area code: 012

Lukasrand is an established suburb to the southeast of Pretoria, South Africa.

== See also ==
- Lukasrand Tower
