= Rayfiel =

Rayfiel is a surname. Notable people with the surname include:

- David Rayfiel (1923–2011), American screenwriter
  - David Rayfiel House
- Leo F. Rayfiel (1888–1978), American politician and judge

== See also ==
- Rayfield
