= List of tallest buildings in the New Administrative Capital =

This list of the tallest buildings in Egypt's New Administrative Capital ranks skyscrapers and high-rises by height.

== Skyscrapers and high-rises completed and under construction ==
=== MU10 ===
| Rank | Name | Usage | Max Height | Roof Height | Floors | Started | Construction Status | Total Area | Notes | Renders |
|---|---|---|---|---|---|---|---|---|---|---|
| 1 | Iconic Tower | Hotel, Residential, and Office | 393.8 m (1,292 ft) | 382.2 m (1,254 ft) | 77 | 2019 | Completed | 260,000m^{2} | Tallest building in Africa. | |
| 2 | D01 | Residential | 196 m (643 ft) | 196 m (643 ft) | 49 | 2018 | Completed | 116,621m^{2} | Tallest residential building in Africa. | |
| 3 | D02 | Residential | 176 m (577 ft) | 176 m (577 ft) | 45 | 2018 | Completed | | | |
| 4 | D03 | Residential | 176 m (577 ft) | 176 m (577 ft) | 45 | 2018 | Completed | | | |
| 5 | C01 | Office | 174 m (571 ft) | 174 m (571 ft) | 35 | 2018 | Completed | | | |
| 6 | C04 | Office | 170 m (558 ft) | 170 m (558 ft) | 34 | 2018 | Completed | | | |
| 7 | C11 | Office | 160 m (525 ft) | 160 m (525 ft) | 27 | 2018 | Completed | | | |
| 8 | C12 | Office | 160 m (525 ft) | 160 m (525 ft) | 27 | 2018 | Completed | | | |
| 9 | C07 | Office | 159.9 m (525 ft) | 159.9 m (525 ft) | 32 | 2018 | Completed | | | |
| 10 | C08 | Office | 159.9 m (525 ft) | 159.9 m (525 ft) | 32 | 2018 | Completed | | | |
| 11 | D04 | Residential | 159.8 m (524 ft) | 159.8 m (524 ft) | 40 | 2018 | Completed | | | |
| 12 | D05 | Residential | 152.5 m (500 ft) | 152.5 m (500 ft) | 38 | 2018 | Completed | | | |
| 13 | C05 | Office | 95 m (312 ft) | 95 m (312 ft) | 18 | 2018 | Completed | | | |
| 14 | C06 | Office | 95 m (312 ft) | 95 m (312 ft) | 18 | 2018 | Completed | | | |
| 15 | C02 | Office | 85 m (279 ft) | 85 m (279 ft) | 16 | 2018 | Completed | | | |
| 16 | C03 | Office | 85 m (279 ft) | 85 m (279 ft) | 16 | 2018 | Completed | | | |
| 17 | C09 | Hotel and Office | 55 m (180 ft) | 55 m (180 ft) | 9 | 2018 | Completed | | Will feature a luxury 5-star hotel. | |
| 18 | C10 | Hotel and Office | 55 m (180 ft) | 55 m (180 ft) | 9 | 2018 | Completed | | Will feature a luxury 5-star hotel. | |

=== MU07 ===
| Name | Usage | Max height | Roof height | Floors | Started | Construction Status | Total area | Developer | Notes | Renders |
|---|---|---|---|---|---|---|---|---|---|---|
| Capital Diamond Tower | Mixed-Use | 260m | 260m | 66 | 2021 | Under Construction | | Amazon Holding developments | | |
| Infinity Tower | Mixed-Use | 250m | 250m | 50 | 2021 | Under Construction | | Infinity for Urban Development | | |
| Forbes International Tower | Mixed-Use | 240m | 240m | 55 | 2026 | Approved | | Magnom Property | | |
| Taj Tower 2 | Office & Commercial | 230m | 230m | 58 | 2026 | Approved | | Taj Misr Developments | | |
| East Tower | Mixed-Use | 185m | 185m | 45 | 2022 | Under Construction | | UC Developments | | |
| 6ixty Iconic Tower | Mixed-Use | 180m | 180m | 45 | 2022 | Under Construction | | AlBorouj Masr | | |
| Taj Tower | Office & Commercial | 170m | 170m | 43 | 2022 | Under Construction | | Taj Misr Developments | | |
| Quan Tower | Mixed-Use | 110m | 110m | 25 | 2023 | Under Construction | | Contact Developments | | |
| Central Iconic Hotel | Leisure and Hospitality | ~100m | ~100m | 18 | 2023 | Under Construction | | Modon Developments | | |
| Double Two Tower | Mixed-Use | 100m | 100m | 23 | 2022 | Under Construction | | Nakheel Developments | | |
| Triton Tower | Mixed-Use | 80m | 80m | 14 | 2022 | Under Construction | | RNA Developments | | |
| Ryan Tower | Mixed-Use | 75m | ? | 15 | 2022 | Under Construction | | Khaled Sabry Holding | | |
| PAVO Tower | Mixed-Use | 68m | ? | 14 | 2022 | Under Construction | | Mercon Developments | | |

=== MU19 ===
| Name | Usage | Max height | Roof height | Floors | Started | Construction Status | Total area | Developer | Notes | Renders |
|---|---|---|---|---|---|---|---|---|---|---|
| Nile Business City Tower | Mixed-Use | 233m | 233m | 56 | 2022 | Under Construction | | Nile Developments | | |
| Levels Business City Tower | Mixed-Use | 153m | 153m | 36 | 2022 | Under Construction | | Urbnlanes Developments | | |
| 31North Tower | Mixed-Use | 131m | 131m | 36 | 2021 | Under Construction | | Nile Developments | | |
| OIA Towers | Mixed-Use | 111m | 111m | 30 | 2021 | Under Construction | | EDGE Holdings | | |
| Podia Tower | Mixed-Use | 110m | 110m | 29 | 2021 | Under Construction | | Menassat Developments | | |
| Green River Tower | Mixed-Use | 110m | | 30 | 2023 | Under Construction | | Modon Developments | | |
| Obsidier Towers | Mixed-Use | ~110m | | 29 | 2022 | Under Construction | | Dubai Developments | | |
| Monorail Tower | Mixed-Use | ~100m | ? | 26 | 2022 | Under Construction | | ERG Developments | | |
| Pyramids Business Towers | Mixed-Use | 96m | ? | 21 | 2022 | Under Construction | | Pyramids Developments | | |
| iBusiness Park Towers | Mixed-Use | 91m | ? | 20 | 2022 | Under Construction | | ARQA Developments Group | | |
| Trio V Tower | Mixed-Use | 90m | ? | 18 | 2022 | Under Construction | | Nakheel Developments | | |

== Future Proposed Towers ==
| Name | Usage | Max Height | Roof Height | Floors | Started | Construction Status | Total area | Notes | Renders |
|---|---|---|---|---|---|---|---|---|---|
| Oblisco Capitale Tower | Hotel, Office, and Residential | 1,000 m (3,281 ft) | 1,000 m (3,281 ft) | 250 | N/A | Approved | ? | World's tallest building upon completion; Projected to be completed by 2030 | |
| Nut Towers | Office and Residential | 380 m (1,247 ft) | 380 m (1,247 ft) | 80 | N/A | Proposed | ? | | |
