= Rayfield =

Rayfield is an English surname. Notable people with the name include:

== People ==
- Dan Rayfield (born 1979), American politician from Oregon
- Donald Rayfield (born 1942), British professor and writer
- Emily Rayfield, British palaeontologist
- Gordon Rayfield, American television writer
- John M. Rayfield (1926–2010), American politician from North Carolina
- Lee Rayfield (born 1955), Anglican Bishop of Swindon
- Wallace Rayfield (1874–1941), African American architect
- Walter Leigh Rayfield (1881–1949), Canadian recipient of the Victoria Cross
- Rayfield Dupree (born 1953), American athlete
- Rayfield Wright (1945–2022), American football offensive tackle

== Other ==
- Split Lip Rayfield, sometimes called "Rayfield", a vocal and (acoustic) instrumental group from Wichita, Kansas.
- Rayfield (automobile)
- Rayfield v Hands, 1960 UK company law case

== See also ==
- Rayfiel, surname
