= Lukasrand Tower =

Communications tower in Pretoria, South Africa

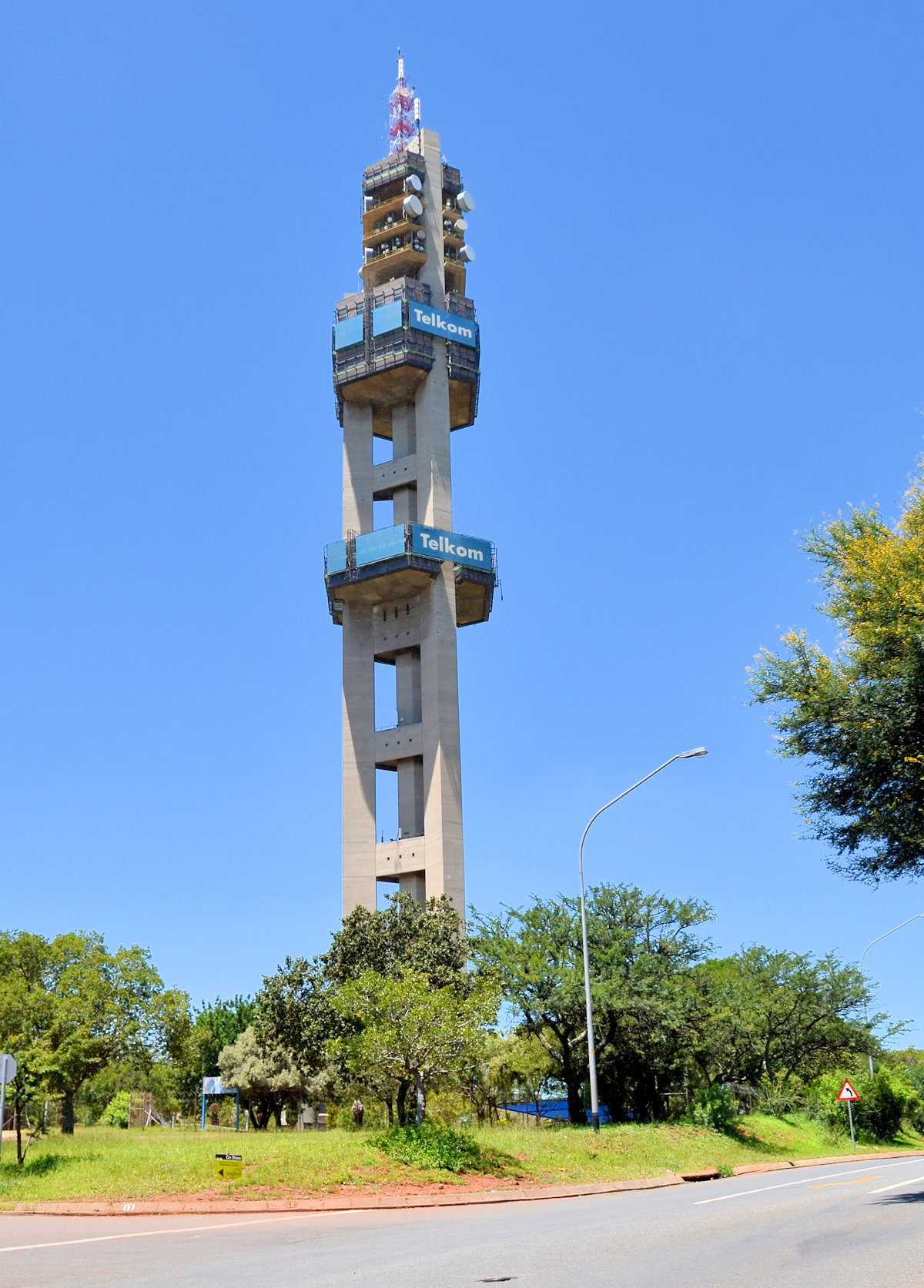
- Lukasrand Tower
- Interactive map of the Lukasrand Tower area

General information
- Status: Completed
- Type: Radio tower
- Location: Pretoria, South Africa
- Coordinates: 25°45′58″S 28°12′20″E
- Completed: 1978; 48 years ago

Height
- Antenna spire: 198 m (650 ft)

The Lukasrand Tower (formerly known as the John Vorster Tower) is located on Muckleneuk Hill in the Lukasrand suburb of Pretoria, Gauteng, South Africa. The tower was built in 1978 and its primary purpose is wireless telecommunications (e.g., microwave transmission, mobile phone, etc.). It also features an observation deck. The tower is dressed with branding signs for Telkom SA. For a time (September 2009 to prior to August 2012), the tower also sported a 24-metre, eight storey high, fibreglass soccer ball, for the 2010 World Cup.

== Sources ==
- Denis Farrell (7 August 2012). "The Lukasrand Tower with the Telkom branding is photographed in Pretoria, South Africa, Tuesday Aug. 7, 2012". Yahoo! News/Associated Press.
- Martin Olivier (28 May 2011). "Network Museum". Lukasrand Tower. Martin Olivier.
- "Telkom Tower, Leyds Street, Lukasrand, Tshwane". ABLEWiki.
