= Lethabo Power Station =

Coal power plant in the Free State, South Africa

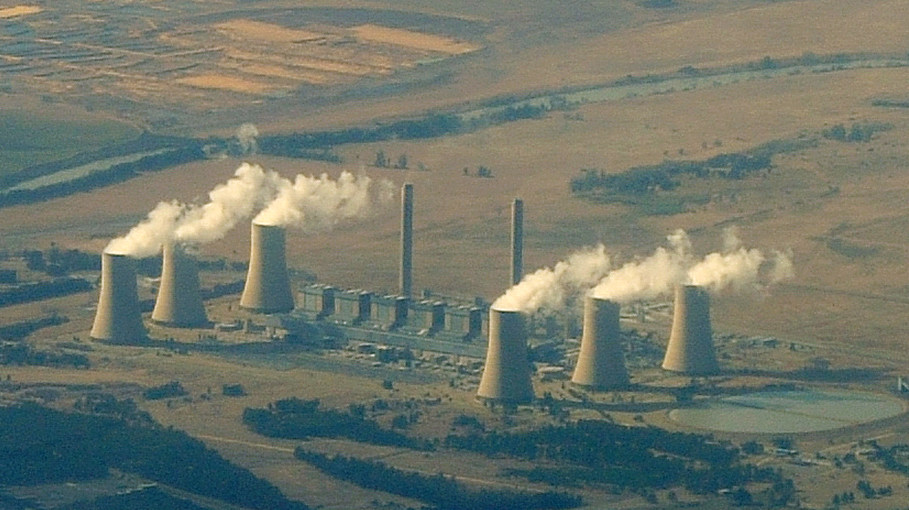
- Location of Lethabo Power Station within South Africa
- Country: South Africa
- Location: Metsimaholo, Free State, South Africa
- Coordinates: 26°44′31″S 27°58′39″E
- Status: Operational
- Commission date: 1985
- Owner: Eskom
- Operator: Eskom

Thermal power station
- Primary fuel: Coal
- Turbine technology: Steam turbine

Power generation
- Units operational: 6
- Units planned: 6 × 618 MW
- Nameplate capacity: 3,708 Megawatt

External links
- Commons: Related media on Commons

Lethabo Power Station in the Free State, South Africa, is a large coal fired power station owned and operated by Eskom.

== Power generation ==
The station is located between Vereeniging and Sasolburg in the Free State and consists of six 618 MW units for a total installed capacity of 3,708 MW. Total efficiency at Turbine Maximum Continuous Rating is 37.80%

Lethabo burns coal with a calorific value of 15 - 16 MJ/kg and an ash content of 42%. It is the only power station in the world running on such low grade coal.

The Lethabo power station has approximately 1100 employees.

=== Technical details ===
- Six 618 MW units
- Installed capacity: 3 708 MW
- 2001 capacity: 3558 MW
- Design efficiency at rated turbine MCR (%): 37.80%
- Ramp rate: 33.33% per hour
- Average availability over last 3 years: 93.05%
- Average production over last 3 years: 21,572 GWh

=== History ===
Construction of Lethabo started in 1980 and by December 1990, the station was fully operational. The station has been built on 11 000 concrete piles which were sunk 25 metres deep. The reason being to alleviate the heaving clay problem after some 190 000 bluegum trees were removed during site clearing. At the time, it was the largest piling contract ever awarded to a South African contractor.

== See also ==
- List of power stations in South Africa
