= List of tallest structures by country =

This is a list of the tallest completed buildings, towers and other structures by country. The list includes the tallest buildings and structures for each country, and, where appropriate, it also points to more detailed country-specific lists.

== Africa ==
=== Algeria ===
- Kenadsa longwave transmitter, 357 m (1,171 ft)
- Tipaza Longwave Transmitter, 355 m (1,165 ft)
- Ain Beida Transmitter, Ain Beida, 278 m (912 ft)
- Les Trembles Transmitter, Les Trembles, 270 m (886 ft)
- Bahia Center, 111 m (364 ft)
- Maqam Echahid, 100 m (328 ft)

=== Egypt ===
- Iconic Tower, 393 m (1,289 ft)
- El-Mahalla El-Kubra TV Mast, 323 m (1,060 ft)
- Suez Canal overhead line crossing, 221 m (725 ft)
- Cairo Tower, 187 m (614 ft)
- Great Pyramid of Giza, built c. 2570 BC, tallest structure until c. 1300, originally 146.5 m (481 ft), currently 138.75 m (455 ft)
- Red Pyramid of Sneferu, built c. 2600 BC, world's tallest structure until 2570 BC, 105 m (344 ft)

=== Ghana ===
- Villagio Vista (Accra), 71 m (233 ft)

=== Kenya ===
- Britam Tower (Nairobi), 200 m (656 ft)
- GTC TOWERS (Nairobi), 183 m (600 ft)
- UAP Tower (Nairobi), 163 m (535 ft)
- GTC JW MARRIOT (Nairobi), 146 m (479 ft)
- PRISM TOWERS (Nairobi) 143 m (470 ft)
- TIMES TOWERS (Nairobi), 140 m (459 ft)

=== Madagascar ===
- Imerintsiatosika Radio Mast, Imerintsiatosika, 240 m (787 ft)
- Antananarivo TV Tower, Antananarivo, 203 m (666 ft)

=== Mauritius ===
- Bigara Station Transmitter, Plaines Wilhems, 183 m (600 ft)
- Bank of Mauritius Tower, Port Louis, 124 m (407 ft)
- Mauritius Telecom Tower, Port Louis, 101 m (331 ft)

=== Morocco ===
- Nador transmitter, Nador, 3 guyed masts each 380 m (1,247 ft) tall
- Azilal longwave transmitter, Azilal, 304.8 m (1,000 ft)
- Noor III CSP tower, Ourzazate, 250 m (820 ft)
- Hassan II Mosque, Casablanca, 210 m (689 ft), the second tallest minaret in the world
- Maroc Telecom HQ, Rabat, 139 m (456 ft)
- Casablanca Twin Center, Casablanca, 115 m (377 ft)

=== Niger ===
- Zinder TV Mast, Zinder, 250 m (820 ft)

=== Nigeria ===
- Abeokuta Radio Mast, Abeokuta, 321.5 m (1,055 ft)
- PRTVC Rayfield Tower, Rayfield, 304.8 m (1,000 ft)
- New Netim TV Mast, New Netim, 304.8 m (1,000 ft)
- AKBC Broadcasting Tower, Uyo, 300.5 m (986 ft)
- Large Ikorodu TV Mast, Ikorodu, 300.2 m (985 ft)

=== South Africa ===
- Chimney (smoke stack) of SASOL III Synthetic Fuel Production Plant, Secunda, 301 m (988 ft)
- Chimney (smoke stack) of Duvha Power Station, Witbank, 300 m (984 ft)
- Chimney (smoke stack) of Lethabo Power Station, Sasolburg, 275 m (902 ft)
- Carlton Centre, former tallest building in Africa, 223 m (732 ft)
- The Hillbrow Tower, microwave tower, Johannesburg, 269 m (883 ft)
- Sentech Tower and SABC Radiopark, Transmission Tower, Johannesburg,
- 239 m (784 ft)

=== Tanzania ===
- Tanzania Ports Authority Tower, Dar es Salaam,162 m (531 ft)
- PPF Towers 2, Dar es Salaam,160 m (525 ft)
- PSPF Commercial Tower 1, Dar es Salaam, 157 m (515 ft)
- MNF Square 1, Dar es Salaam,145 m (476 ft)
- MNF Square 2, Dar es Salaam,145 m (476 ft)

=== Tunisia ===
- Zarzis TV Mast, Zarzis, 320 m (1,050 ft)Tallest Structure
- Africa Hotel (112 m) Tallest Skyscraper
- Tour de la nation,(Nation Tower) Second tallest skyscraper and Tallest Office Building (96 m)
- Laico Hotel (90 m) Third Tallest Building and Second Tallest Hotel
- City of Culture (75 m)
- Banque de L'habitat (75 m) Second Tallest Office Building

=== Democratic Republic of the Congo ===
- Tower of Limete, Kinshasa, 210 m (689 ft)

== Americas ==
=== Argentina ===
- Omega Tower Trelew, Trelew, 366 m (1,201 ft) (demolished), formerly tallest structure in South America
- Buenos Aires Radio Rivadavia AM Broadcasting Mast, Buenos Aires, 252 m (827 ft)
- Torre Espacial, Buenos Aires, 228 m (748 ft)
- Alvear Tower, Buenos Aires, 239 m (784 ft)
- Le Parc Figueroa Alcorta, Buenos Aires, 172.8 m (567 ft)
- Renoir Towers, Buenos Aires, 175 m (574 ft)
- El Faro Towers, Buenos Aires, 170 m (558 ft)
- Mulieris Towers, Buenos Aires, 164 m (538 ft)
- Repsol-YPF Tower, Buenos Aires, 160 m (525 ft)
- Chateau Puerto Madero, Buenos Aires, 155.7 m (511 ft)
- Le Parc Tower, Buenos Aires, 157 m (515 ft)
- Torres del Yacht, Buenos Aires, 140.8 m (462 ft)
- BankBoston Tower, Buenos Aires, 137.2 m (450 ft)
- Alas Building, Buenos Aires, 132.1 m (433 ft)
- Madero Office, Buenos Aires, 131 m (430 ft)
- Dolfines Guaraní, Rosario, 136 m (446 ft)
- Capitalinas Towers, Córdoba, 135 m (443 ft)

=== Belize ===
- Mayan caana at Caracol 43 m (141 ft)
- El Castillo pyramid at Xunantunich 40 m (131 ft)

=== Brazil ===
- Amazon Tall Tower Observatory, Vila de Balbina, Amazonas, 325 m (1066 ft)
- Radio Gaúcha AM Guaíba Mast, Guaíba, Rio Grande do Sul, 230 m (755 ft)
- Brasilia TV Tower, Brasília, Distrito Federal, 224 m (735 ft)
- Millennium Palace, Balneário Camboriú, Santa Catarina, 177.3 m (581.7 ft)
- Mirante do Vale, São Paulo, São Paulo, 170 m (558 ft)
- Edifício Itália, São Paulo, São Paulo, 168 m (551 ft)
- Rio Sul Center, Rio de Janeiro, Rio de Janeiro, 164 m (538 ft)
- Altino Arantes Building, São Paulo, São Paulo, 161 m (528 ft)
- 105 Lélio Gama St., Rio de Janeiro, Rio de Janeiro, 160 m (523 ft)

=== Canada ===
- CN Tower, 553 m (1,814 ft), tallest free-standing structure in the world on land until 12 September 2007, when it was surpassed by the Burj Khalifa (officially surpassed when the Burj Khalifa opened, on 4 January 2010)
- Cape Race LORAN-C transmission mast, 411.48 m (1,350 ft) (collapsed in 1993, replaced afterwards by 260.3 m (854 ft) tall mast)
- Inco Superstack, tallest freestanding chimney in the Western hemisphere, 381 m (1,250 ft)
- CBC Tower, Shawinigan, Quebec, 371 m (1,217 ft) (demolished in 2001, replaced?)
- First Canadian Place, tallest building in Canada, built in 1975, 72 floors, 298 m (978 ft) (355 m (1,165 ft) to antenna)

=== Chile ===
- Gran Torre Santiago, 300 m (984 ft)
- Titanium La Portada, 190 m (623 ft)
- Marriott Hotel, 145 m (476 ft)
- CTC Corporate Building, a.k.a. Telefónica Tower, 141 m (463 ft)
- Torre Entel, 127 m (417 ft)

=== Colombia ===
- BD Bacatá, in Bogotá (South Tower), 260 m (853 ft), the tallest Colombian building
- BD Bacatá, in Bogotá (North Tower), 216 m (709 ft)
- Colpatria Tower (Torre Colpatria), in Bogotá, 196 m (643 ft)
- Cali Tower (Torre de Cali), in Cali, 183 m (600 ft), the tallest Colombian structure when including the antenna
- World Trade Center, in Bogotá, 190 m (623 ft)
- Torre Coltejer, in Medellín, 175 m (574 ft)
- The Icon, in Barranquilla, 175 m (574 ft)
- La Nacional Building, in Bogotá, 171 m (561 ft)
- Caja de Empleados de la Policía Nacional Building, in Bogotá, 168 m (551 ft)
- Mirage 57, in Barranquilla, 162 m (531 ft)
- Avianca Building, in Bogotá, 161 m (528 ft)
- Coffee Tower, in Medellín, 160 m (525 ft)
- Colseguros Building, in Bogotá, 160 m (525 ft)
- Building of the Offices of the Comptroller General, in Bogotá, 140 m (459 ft)

=== Cuba ===
- FOCSA Building, 120 m (394 ft), 36 floors
- Camagüey TV Mast, 238 m (780 ft)
- Televilla, 207 m (680 ft)
- Hotel Melia Cohiba 60 m (197 ft)

=== Dominican Republic ===
- Torre Anacaona 27, Anacaona, Santo Domingo, 41 floors, 180 m (591 ft)
- Torre Caney Anacaona, Santo Domingo, 42 floors, 178 m (584 ft)
- Monumento de Santiago, Santiago de los Caballeros, 175 m (574 ft)
- Torres mar Azul, 140m, Santo Domingo, 40 floors tower 1 and 3, 127m, 35 floors
- Silver Sun Gallery, 135m, 34 floors, Santo Domingo
- Malecon Center 1, Malecon, Santo Domingo, 31 floors, 122.4 m (402 ft)
- Malecon Center 2, Malecon, Santo Domingo, 31 floors, 122.4 m (402 ft)
- Malecon Center 3, Malecon, Santo Domingo, 31 floors, 122.4 m (402 ft)
- Torre Azul, Santo Domingo, 27 floors and 120 m (394 ft) + spire 120 m (394 ft)
- Park Towers, 120m, 30 floors (tower 2), Santo Domingo
- Torre Citibank, Winston Churchill Avenue, Santo Domingo, 25 floors, 119 m (390 ft)
- Alco Paradiso, 117m, 25 floors, Santo Domingo
- Torre del Conservatorio, 115m, 25 floors, Santo Domingo la esperillat
- Torre del Sol, 114m, 25 floors, Santo Domingo

=== Ecuador ===
- Torre Maxximus, in Guayaquil, 184 m (604 ft) 51 stories
- Torre The Point, in Guayaquil, 136.5 m (448 ft) 36 stories
- Banco La Previsora, in Guayaquil, 135 m (443 ft) 33 stories

=== El Salvador ===
- Torre El Pedregal, ~112 m (367 ft) currently tallest in the country

=== Mexico ===
- Torre KOI, 280 m (919 ft), Monterrey Metropolitan Area
- Torre Reforma, 246 m (807 ft), Mexico City
- Torre BBVA Bancomer, 235 m (771 ft), Mexico City
- Torre Mayor, 225.6 m (740 ft), Mexico City
- Hotel RIU Plaza Guadalajara, 215 m (705 ft), Guadalajara
- Torre Ejecutiva Pemex, 214 m (702 ft), Mexico City
- Torre Altus, 195 m (640 ft), Mexico City
- Torre Latinoamericana, 182 m (597 ft), Mexico City
- World Trade Center México, 172 m (564 ft), Mexico City
- Torre Aura Altitude, 170 m (558 ft), Guadalajara
- Torre CNCI, 167 m (548 ft), Monterrey
- Arcos Bosques Corporativo, 161.5 m (530 ft), Mexico City
- St. Regis Hotel & Residences, 152 m (499 ft), Mexico City
- Torre Lomas, 146.5 m (481 ft), Mexico City
- Hotel Nikko Mexico, 142 m (466 ft), Mexico City
- Santa Fe Pads, 140.5 m (461 ft), Mexico City
- City Santa Fe Torre Amsterdam, 140 m (459 ft), Mexico City
- Torres Altaire 1,2,4, 140 m (459 ft) (under construction), Mexico City
- Panorama Santa Fe, 139.4 m (457 ft), Mexico City
- Torre HSBC, 136 m (446 ft), Mexico City
- Edifício Latino, 135 m (443 ft), Monterrey
- Torre del Caballito, 135 m (443 ft), Mexico City
- Torre Mural, 133 m (436 ft), Mexico City
- Torre Mexicana de Aviación, 132 m (433 ft), Mexico City
- Presidente InterContinental Hotel, 130 m (427 ft), Mexico City
- Torre Milán, 130 m (427 ft), Mexico City
- Residencial del Bosque 1,2, 128 m (420 ft), Mexico City
- Torre Reforma Axtel, 128 m (420 ft), Mexico City
- Torre Ejecutiva JV 4, 128 m (420 ft) (under construction), Puebla
- Torre Banobras, 127 m (417 ft), Mexico City
- Torre Reforma 222, 125 m (410 ft), Mexico City

=== Panama ===
- JW Marriott Panama, 70 floors 284 m (932 ft)
- Ocean Two, 73 floors 273 m (896 ft)
- Star Bay Tower, 65 floors 267 m (876 ft)
- The Point, 66 floors 266 m (873 ft)
- Arts Tower, 60 floors 264 m (866 ft)
- Vitri Tower, 74 floors 260 m (853 ft)
- Tower Financial Center, 52 floors 231 m (758 ft)
- F&F Tower, 52 floors 243 m (797 ft)
- Pearl Tower, 70 floors 242 m (794 ft)
- Rivage, 68 floors 233 m (764 ft)
- Ocean One Panama City, 54 floors 208 m (682 ft)
- HSBC Tower Panama City, 41 floors 207 m (679 ft)
- Yacht Club Tower, 57 floors, 196 m (643 ft)
- Venetian Tower, 47 floors, 192 m (630 ft)
- Destiny Panama Bay, 51 floors, 182 m (597 ft)

=== Peru ===
- Edificio Banco Continental (BBVA), 18 floors 132 m (433 ft)
- Westin Lima Hotel in San Isidro, 34 floors, 115 m (377 ft), Lima
- Torre del Centro Cívico de Lima, 34 floors, 109 m (358 ft)
- Edificio Chocavento, 25 floors, 107 m (351 ft)

=== Puerto Rico ===
- US Navy Transmission Tower, Aguada, 367.3 m (1,205 ft)
- Telemundo WKAQ TV Tower, Cayey, 336.8 m (1,105 ft)
- Cayey Pegasus Broadcasting Tower, Cayey, 332.5 m (1,091 ft)
- Arso Radio Tower, Cabo Rojo, 208 m (682 ft)
- La Cadena del Milagro Tower, Utuado, 167 m (548 ft)
- Arecibo Radio Telescope, Arecibo, 150 m (492 ft)
- Soleil Building, 88 m (289 ft)

=== Trinidad and Tobago ===
- International Waterfront Tower A Port-of-Spain, 120 m (394 ft)
- International Waterfront Tower B Port-of-Spain, 120 m (394 ft)

=== United States ===
- KVLY-TV mast, 628.8 m (2,063 ft)
- One World Trade Center, 541.3 m (1,776 ft)
- Willis Tower, Chicago, 1974, 108 floors, 442 m (1,450 ft)
- Trump International Hotel and Tower, Chicago, 92 floors, 423 m (1,388 ft)
- Empire State Building, 102 floors, 381 m (1,250 ft)

=== US Virgin Islands ===
- Frenchman's Reef & Morning Star Marriott Beach Resort, 29 m (95 ft)

=== Uruguay ===
- CX-6 Radio Mast, Santiago Vázquez, 245 m (804 ft)
- Channel 10 antenna, 187 m (614 ft)
- Telecommunications Tower (Montevideo), 160 m (525 ft)
- Palacio Salvo, 100 m (328 ft)

=== Venezuela ===
- Pylons of Orinoco River Crossing, Caroní, 240 m (787 ft)
- Parque Central east tower, Caracas, 225 m (738 ft)
- Parque Central west tower, Caracas, 225 m (738 ft)
- Mercantil Tower, Caracas, 183 m (600 ft)
- Provincial Tower, Caracas, 159 m (522 ft)
- Latin Financial center, Caracas, 153 m (502 ft)
- Hotel Alba Caracas, Caracas, 130 m (427 ft)
- Sindoni Tower, Maracay, 125 m (410 ft)
- Citybank Tower, Caracas, 125 m (410 ft)
- Movilnet Tower, Caracas, 125 m (410 ft)
- CorpBanca Tower, Caracas, 124 m (407 ft)
- Polar Tower II, Caracas, 122 m (400 ft)
- Humboldt Tower, Caracas, 120.1 m (394 ft)
- Mohedano Residences, Caracas, 120 m (394 ft)
- Caroata Residences, Caracas, 120 m (394 ft)
- Catuche Residences, Caracas, 120 m (394 ft)
- El Tejar Residences, Caracas, 120 m (394 ft)
- San Martín Residences, Caracas, 120 m (394 ft)
- Tacagua Residences, Caracas, 120 m (394 ft)
- Tajamar Residences, Caracas, 120 m (394 ft)
- Gran Meliá Caracas, Caracas, 120 m (394 ft)
- Torre Banco Plaza, Caracas, 119 m (390 ft)
- Previsora Tower, Caracas, 117 m (384 ft)
- Caracas Palace Hotel, Caracas, 117 m (384 ft)
- BCV Building, Caracas, 117 m (384 ft)

== Asia ==
=== Azerbaijan ===
- Baku TV Tower 310 metres (1,017 ft)
- Baku Tower, Baku, 2020, 52 storeys, 277 metres (909 ft)
- SOCAR Tower, Baku, 2016, 38 storeys, 207 metres (679 ft)
- Flag Pole 162 metres (531 ft)

=== Armenia ===
- TV Tower Yerevan, Yerevan, 311.7 m (1,023 ft)

=== Bahrain ===
- Four Seasons Hotel Manama, Bahrain Bay, 2015, 50 storeys, 269.7 m (885 ft)
- Bahrain Financial Harbour, Manama, 2009, 53 storeys, 260 m (853 ft)
- United Tower, Bahrain Bay, 2016, 48 storeys, 189.2 m (621 ft)

=== Bangladesh ===
- Shanta Pinnacle, Dhaka, 2026, 40 storeys, 152.3 metres (500 ft)

=== Brunei ===
- RTB Subok Tower, Bandar Seri Begawan, 2008, 168 metres (551 ft), tallest structure in Brunei.
- Raja Isteri Pengiran Anak Hajah Saleha (RIPAS) Bridge Tower, Bandar Seri Begawan, 157 metres (515 ft), tallest bridge structure in Brunei
- Ministry of Finance Building, Bandar Seri Begawan, 2001, 120 metres (394 ft), tallest building in Brunei.
- Sultan Haji Omar Ali Saifuddien Bridge towers, Tower 1, 107 metres (351 ft) and Towers 2 & 3, 110.5 metres (363 ft).

=== Cambodia ===
- Vattanac Capital Tower, 187.3 metres (615 ft), tallest building in Cambodia, completed in 2012
- Canadia Bank OCIC Tower, 118.1 metres (387 ft)

=== China ===
- Shanghai Tower, 632 m (2,073 ft), topped out in August 2013, tallest structure in China
- Canton Tower, 600 m (1,969 ft), second tallest structure in China
- Ping An Finance Centre, 599 m (1,965 ft), built in 2017, second tallest building in China and 5th tallest in the world
- Shanghai World Financial Center, 492 m (1,614 ft)
- Oriental Pearl Tower, 468 m (1,535 ft)
- KK100, 100 floors,442 m (1,450 ft)
- Jin Mao Tower, 88 floors, 421 m (1,381 ft)
- Zhoushan Island Overhead Powerline Tie, tallest electricity pylons in the world, 370 m (1,214 ft)
- Yangtze River Crossing Jiangyin, second-tallest electricity pylons in the world, 346.5 m (1,137 ft)
- Yangtze River Crossing Nanjing, tallest electricity pylons in the world built of concrete, 257 m (843 ft)
- Pylons of Pearl River Crossing, 253 m (830 ft)
- Shun Hing Square, 384 metres (1,260 ft), 3rd tallest building in Shenzhen, completed in 1996
- CITIC Plaza, 391 metres (1,283 ft), tallest building in Guangzhou and the tallest concrete building in the world, completed in 1997
- Shimao International Plaza, 333.3 metres (1,094 ft), one of the tallest buildings in Shanghai, completed in 2005
- Plaza 66 tower one, 288 metres (945 ft), one of the tallest buildings in Shanghai, completed in 2001
- SEG Plaza, 356 metres (1,168 ft), currently second tallest building in Shenzhen, completed in 2000
- Minsheng Bank Building, tallest building in Wuhan at 331 meters, completed in 2006
- Wuhan World Trade Tower, 273 metres (896 ft), currently second tallest building in Wuhan, completed in 1998
- Tomorrow Square, 285 metres (935 ft), one of the tallest buildings in Shanghai, completed in 2003
- Chongqing World Trade Center, currently the tallest building in Chongqing at 283 m (928 ft), completed in 2005
- Tianjin Radio and Television Tower, 368 m (1,207 ft), Tianjin, China, used primarily for communication; completed in 1991; member of the World Federation of Great Towers
- Wusung Radio Tower, 321 m (1,053 ft), Wusung

==== Hong Kong ====
- International Commerce Centre, currently the tallest building in Hong Kong at 484 m (1,588 ft), completed in 2010
- Two International Finance Centre, 88 floors, 412 m (1,351.7 ft), completed in 2003
- Central Plaza, 373.9 m (1,227 ft), completed in 1992, tallest building in Hong Kong from 1992 to 2003
- Bank of China Tower, 367.4 m (1,205.4 ft), completed in 1990, tallest building in Hong Kong from 1990 to 1992
- The Center, one of the tallest buildings in Hong Kong at 346 m (1,135 ft), completed in 1998.
- Cheung Kong Centre, 282.8 m (928 ft), completed in 1999
- Nina Tower I, 320.4 m (1,051 ft), Hong Kong, completed in 2006

==== Macau ====
- Macau Tower, 338 m (1,109 ft), the tallest structure in Macau
- Grand Lisboa, 261 m (856 ft), the tallest building in Macau

=== Georgia ===
- Tbilisi TV Broadcasting Tower, 275 m (902 ft)

=== India ===
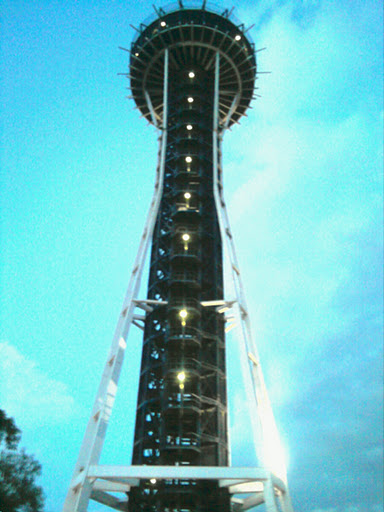
OP Jindal Knowledge Centre at Hisar in Haryana.

- INS Kattabomman, 471 metres (1,545 ft), Tirunelveli, Tamil Nadu, completed in 2013
- Rameswaram TV Tower, 323 metres (1,060 ft), Rameswaram, Tamil Nadu, completed in 1995
- Palais Royale, 320 metres (1,050 ft), Mumbai, to be completed in 2017
- Fazilka TV Tower, 305 metres (1,001 ft), Fazilka, completed in 2007
- INS Kattabomman, Central tower, 301 metres (988 ft), Tirunelveli, Tamil Nadu, completed in 1989
- Mumbai Television Tower, 300 metres (984 ft), Mumbai
- Jaisalmer TV Tower, 300 m (980 ft), completed in 1993
- Samatra TV Tower, 300 m (980 ft), Bhuj, completed in 1999
- O. P. Jindal Knowledge Centre, 282 metres (925 ft), Hisar, Haryana
- Large Masts of INS Kattabomman, 276.45 metres (907 ft), Vijayanarayanam, completed in 1989
- NLC thermal chimney, Tuticorin, 275.5 m
- Coastal energen thermal chimney, Tuticorin, 275.5 m
- Dahanu Thermal Power Station's Chimney,275.3 metres (903 ft), Mumbai, completed in 1995
- Chimney of Sagardighi Thermal Power Station, 275 metres (902 ft), Sagardighi, completed in 2004
- Chimney of Korba Power Plant, 275 metres (902 ft), Korba, completed in 2009
- Tata Power Corporations chimney, 274.32 metres (900 ft), Mumbai
- The 42, Kolkata 268m tall building, completed in 2018
- The Imperial, Mumbai, 256 metres (840 ft), Mumbai, completed in 2010
- Pitampura TV Tower, | 235 metres (771 ft), Delhi, completed in 1988
- Katanga TV Tower, 225 metres (738 ft), Jabalpur, Madhya Pradesh, completed in 1992
- Lodha Bellissimo A&B, 222 metres (728 ft), Mumbai, completed in 2012
- Lodha Bellissimo C, 222 metres (728 ft), Mumbai, completed in 2012

=== Indonesia ===
- Indosiar Television Tower, 395 m (1,296 ft), Jakarta, 2006, tallest structure in Indonesia
- Gama Tower, 310 m (1,017 ft), Jakarta, 2015, 63 storeys
- Wisma 46, 262 m (860 ft), Jakarta, 1996, 51 storeys
- Sahid Sudirman Center, 258 m (846 ft), Jakarta, 2015, 52 storeys
- Raffles Tower, Ciputra World Jakarta, 256 m (840 ft), Jakarta, 2014, 52 storeys
- Pakubowono Signature, 252 m (827 ft), Jakarta, 2014, 50 storeys
- Sinarmas MSIG Tower, 245 m (804 ft), Jakarta, 2015, 48 storeys
- BCA Tower, Grand Indonesia, 230 m (755 ft), Jakarta, 2014, 56 storeys
- Keraton Residence, 225 m (738 ft), Jakarta, 2009, 48 storeys
- Equity Tower, 220 m (722 ft), Jakarta, 2008, 44 storeys
- The Peak 1, 219 m (719 ft), Jakarta, 2008, 55 storeys
- The Peak 2, 219 m (719 ft), Jakarta, 2008, 55 storeys
- Tunjungan Plaza 6, 215 m (705 ft), Surabaya, 2017, 51 storeys
- Amartapura I, 163 m (535 ft), Tangerang, 1997, 55 storeys
- Matahari Tower, 162 m (531 ft), Tangerang, 1996, 55 storeys
- Amartapura II, 158 m (518 ft), Tangerang, 1997, 55 storeys
- U residence, 157 m (515 ft), Tangerang, 2009, 44 storeys

=== Iran ===
- Milad Tower, 435 m (1,427 ft), Tehran, tallest structure in Iran
- Zibakenar TV Mast, 365 m (1,198 ft) Aliabad, Rasht
- zahedan mediumwave transmitter,276 m (905 ft 6 in) Zahedan
- goldaste medium wave transmitter,256 m (839 ft 10 1/2 in) Gol Dasteh, Tehran
- Fereshteh Pasargad Hotel230 m (754 ft 7 in), Tehran
- Karun-4 Dam,230 m (754 ft 7 in) Chaharmahal and Bakhtiari province
- Padideh Shandiz Hotel,225 m (738 ft 2 1/2 in) Mashhad
- Aysan twin towers,205 m (672 ft 7 in) Tabriz
- Karun-3 Dam,205 m (672 ft 7 in) Khuzestan province
- Dez Dam203 m (666 ft 0 in), Andimeshk
- Shazand power plant,200 m (656 ft 2 in) Shazand
- Saman Faraz tower,184 m (603 ft 8 in) Tehran
- Amir Kabir Dam,180 m (590 ft 6 1/2 in) Karaj
- Seimare Dam,180 m (590 ft 6 1/2 in) Ilam province
- Adima tower,170 m (557 ft 9 in) Mazandaran province
- Tehran International Tower, 162 m (531 ft), 54 floors Tehran

=== Iraq ===
- Umm Qasr TV Mast, Umm Qasr, 492 m (1,614 ft)
- Basra transmitter, Mast West, Basra, 350.5 m (1,150 ft)
- Nahr al Bawadish TV Mast, Buhriz, 349 m (1,145 ft)
- Al Neser TV Mast, Al Neser, 336.8 m (1,105 ft)
- Nineveh TV Mast, Mosul, 324.6 m (1,065 ft)
- Bakriya Transmitter, Mast Northeast, Baghdad, 319.4 m (1,048 ft)
- Samawah TV Mast, Samawah, 318.5 m (1,045 ft)
- Husaibah TV Mast, Al-Qa'im, 317.9 m (1,043 ft)

=== Israel ===
- Dimona Radar Facility, Dimona, 400 m (1,312 ft), tallest structure in Israel
- Chimney 3 of Orot Rabin, Hadera, 300 m (984 ft)
- Chimney 1 of Orot Rabin, Hadera, 250 m (820 ft)
- Chimney 2 of Orot Rabin, Hadera, 250 m (820 ft)
- Azrieli Sarona Tower, Tel Aviv, 238 m (781 ft), tallest building in Israel
- Moshe Aviv Tower, Ramat Gan, 235 m (771 ft)
- HaShahar Tower, Giv'atayim, 212 m (696 ft)
- Azrieli Center Circular Tower, Tel Aviv, 187 m (614 ft)
- Azrieli Center Triangular Tower, Tel Aviv, 169 m (554 ft)
- Kirya Tower, Tel Aviv, 158 m (518 ft)
- Leonardo City Tower Hotel, Ramat Gan, 157 m (515 ft)
- Azrieli Center Square Tower, Tel Aviv, 154 m (505 ft)
- Chimney of Reading Power Station, Tel Aviv, 150 m (492 ft)

=== Japan ===
- Tokyo Skytree, 634 m (2,080 ft)
- Tokyo Tower, 333 m (1,093 ft)
- Azabudai Hills Mori JP Tower, 325.5 m (1,068 ft)
- Abeno Harukas, 300 m (984 ft)
- Yokohama Landmark Tower, 295.8 m (970 ft)

=== Kazakhstan ===
- Chimney of GRES-2 Power Station, 1987, world's tallest chimney, 419.7 m (1,377 ft)
- Almaty Tower, Almaty, 371.5 m (1,219 ft)
- Sarepta transmitter, Sarepta, 356 m (1,168 ft)
- Novaya TV Mast, Karaganda, 350 m (1,148 ft)

=== Kuwait ===
- Kuwait Towers Main tower 187 m (614 ft)

=== Kyrgyzstan ===
- Chimney of Bishkek TEC, Bishkek, 300 m (984 ft)

=== Lebanon ===
- Sky Gate, Beirut, 181 m (594 ft)
- Platinum Tower, Beirut, 153 m (502 ft)
- Marina Towers, Beirut, 150 m (492 ft)
- Habtoor Grand Hotel, Beirut, 130 m (427 ft)
- Bay Tower, Beirut, 125 m (410 ft)
- Four Seasons Hotel, Beirut, 120 m (394 ft)
- Hosn 440, Beirut, 113 m (371 ft)
- Beirut Tower, Beirut, 112 m (367 ft)
- Ashrafieh Tower, Beirut, 100 m (328 ft)
- Atomium 5242, Beirut, 100 m (328 ft)

=== Malaysia ===
- Merdeka 118, Kuala Lumpur, 678.9 m (2,227 ft), second tallest building in the world
- The Exchange 106, Kuala Lumpur, 453.6 m (1,488 ft)
- Petronas Twin Towers, Kuala Lumpur, 451.9 m (1,483 ft), tallest twin buildings in the world
- Kuala Lumpur Tower, Kuala Lumpur, 421 m (1,381 ft), tallest telecommunication tower in Southeast Asia
- Four Seasons Place Kuala Lumpur, Kuala Lumpur, 343 m (1,125 ft)
- Menara Telekom, Kuala Lumpur, 310 m (1,017 ft)
- The Astaka A, Johor Bahru, 279 m (915 ft)
- Menara Ilham, Kuala Lumpur, 274 m (899 ft)
- Petronas Tower 3, Kuala Lumpur, 267 m (876 ft)
- The Astaka B, Johor Bahru, 256 m (840 ft)
- Maybank Tower, Kuala Lumpur, 244 m (801 ft)
- Vista Tower, Kuala Lumpur, 238 m (781 ft), formerly Empire Tower
- KOMTAR Tower, George Town, Penang, 232 m (761 ft)
- Menara Maxis, Kuala Lumpur, 212 m (696 ft)
- Bangunan AMFinance, Kuala Lumpur, 210 m (689 ft)
- Pavilion Kuala Lumpur, Kuala Lumpur, > 200 m (656 ft)
- Berjaya Times Square Tower A, Kuala Lumpur, 203 m (666 ft)
- Berjaya Times Square Tower B, Kuala Lumpur, 203 m (666 ft)
- Menara Multi Purpose, Kuala Lumpur, 198 m (650 ft)
- Maju Tower, Kuala Lumpur, 196 m (643 ft)
- Menara Standard Chartered, Kuala Lumpur, 193 m (633 ft)
- Menara Citibank, Kuala Lumpur, 190 m (623 ft)
- Kuantan 188, Kuantan, 188 m (617 ft)
- Marinara, Kuala Lumpur, 186 m (610 ft)
- Grand Seasons Hotel, Kuala Lumpur, 184 m (604 ft)
- Menara Dato' Onn, Kuala Lumpur, 175 m (574 ft)
- Menara Public Bank, Kuala Lumpur, 170 m (558 ft)
- Wisma Goldhill, Kuala Lumpur, 168 m (551 ft)
- Alor Setar Tower, Alor Setar, 165.5 m (543 ft)
- Dayabumi Complex, Kuala Lumpur, 157 m (515 ft)
- Dynasty Hotel, Kuala Lumpur, 155 m (509 ft)
- Hilton Hotel, Kuala Lumpur, 154 m (505 ft)
- Le Meridien Hotel, Kuala Lumpur, 154 m (505 ft)
- Tabung Haji Tower, Kuala Lumpur, 152 m (499 ft)
- MAHA Tower, Kuah, 138 m (453 ft)
- KLIA2 Control Tower, Sepang, 133.8 m (439 ft)
- KLIA Control Tower, Sepang, 130 m (427 ft)
- Taming Sari Tower, Bandar Hilir, 110 m (361 ft)
- MAIWP Tower, Kuala Lumpur, 101.5 m (333 ft)
- Merdeka Square Flagpole, Kuala Lumpur, 95 m (312 ft)

=== Mongolia ===
- Bayan-Ölgii Province radio broadcast longwave tower, radio mast, 352.5 m (1,156 ft)
- National Radio Broadcasting Center tower at Khonkhor, 305 m (1,001 ft)
- Dornod Province radio broadcast station tower, 271.4 m (890 ft)
- Govi-Altai Province radio broadcast station tower, 260 m (853 ft)
- Thermal Power Plant No. 4 chimney, Ulaanbaatar, concrete chimney, 250 m (820 ft)
- Mongolian National Public Radio and Television antenna, Ulaanbaatar, steel tower, 193 m (633 ft)
- Ulaanbaatar, Shangrila apartment office and hotel, 35-storey 136 m (446 ft)
- Ulaanbaatar, Blue Sky Tower, 25-storey, 105 m (344 ft)
- Ulaanbaatar, Tuushin hotel tower, 25-storey, 105 m (344 ft)
- Ulaanbaatar, Soyombo tower, 30-storey, 100 m (328 ft)

=== Myanmar ===
- Yeywa Dam, dam in Kyaukse, 134 m (440 ft)
- Lower Paunglaung Dam, dam in Pyinmana, 131 m (430 ft)
- Laykyun Sekkya, Buddha statue in Monywa, 129.4 m (425 ft)
- Shwemawdaw Pagoda, Buddhist stupa in Bago, 125 m (410 ft)
- Diamond Inya Palace, condominium in Yangon, ~122 m (400 ft)

=== Nepal ===
- Silver City Apartments, Kathmandu
- KL Tower, Kathmandu
- Central Business Park, Kathmandu
- Nepal Life City Center, Kathmandu
- Business Center Nepal, Kathmandu
- United World Trade Centre, Kathmandu
- Kantipur Publications Building, Kathmandu
- Bhat Bhateni Super Market, Kathmandu
- Sun City Apartments, Kathmandu
- Grande Hotel, Kathmandu
- Yak & Yeti, Kathmandu
- Guna Colony, Kathmandu

=== North Korea ===
- Ryugyong Hotel, Pyongyang, 1995, 105 floors, 330 m (1,083 ft)

=== Pakistan ===
- Bahria Icon Tower Karachi, 286 m (938 ft), 62 storeys
- Bakht Tower Karachi, 145 m (476 ft), 38 storeys
- 70 Riveria Karachi, 130 m (427 ft), 29 storeys
- Ocean Towers Karachi, 120 m (394 ft), 30 storeys
- MCB Tower Karachi, 116 m (381 ft), 29 storeys
- Centaurus Corporate Tower Islamabad, 116 m (381 ft), 32 storeys
- Telecom Tower Islamabad, 113 m (371 ft), 24 storeys
- Coral Towers 1 Karachi, 112 m (367 ft), 28 storeys
- Coral Towers 2 Karachi, 112 m (367 ft), 28 storeys
- Center Point Karachi, 110 m (361 ft), 29 storeys
- Centaurus Residential Tower 1 Islamabad, 110 m (361 ft), 32 storeys
- Centaurus Residential Tower 2 Islamabad, 110 m (361 ft), 32 storeys
- Bahria Town Tower Karachi, 108 m (354 ft), 26 storeys
- Mega G4 Corporate Tower Karachi, 108 m (354 ft), 28 storeys
- Arfa Software Technology Park Lahore, 106 m (348 ft), 17 storeys
- One Constitution Tower 1 Islamabad, 105 m (344 ft), 25 storeys
- One Constitution Tower 2 Islamabad, 105 m (344 ft), 25 storeys
- Dolmen City, Karachi, 103 m (338 ft), 23 storeys
- The Center Karachi, 102 m (335 ft), 22 storeys
- Habib Bank Plaza Karachi, 101 m (331 ft), 22 storeys
- UBL Tower Karachi, 101 m (331 ft), 25 storeys
- PIC Towers Karachi, 100.5 m (330 ft), 23 storeys
- Islamic Towers Karachi, 100 m (328 ft), 24 storeys
- Lakhani Presidency Karachi, 100 m (328 ft), 22 storeys

=== Philippines ===
- The Gramercy Residences, Makati, 302 m (991 ft), 68 storeys
- PBCom Tower, Makati, 259 m (850 ft), 52 storeys plus an 8-level radio tower, built 2000
- GMA-7 Tower of Power, Quezon City, 237 m (778 ft), built 1988
- G.T. International Tower, Makati, 217 m (712 ft), 47 floors, built 2001
- The St. Francis Shangri-La Place, Mandaluyong, 213 m (699 ft), 60 storeys, built 2009
- Petron Megaplaza, Makati, 210 m (689 ft), 210 m (689 ft), 45 storeys, built 1998
- UnionBank Plaza, Pasig, 206 m (676 ft), 49 storeys, built 2004
- The Residences at Greenbelt - San Lorenzo Tower, Makati, 205 m (673 ft), 57 storeys, built 2009
- 1322 Roxas Boulevard, Manila, 203 m (666 ft), 57 storeys, built 2004
- One Corporate Centre, Pasig, 202 m (663 ft) 54 storeys, built 2007
- One Rockwell West Tower, Makati, 202 m (663 ft) 55 storeys
- Philamlife Tower, Makati, 200 m (656 ft), 48 storeys, built 2000
- ABS-CBN Tower, Quezon City, 650 ft (198 m)
- BSA Twin Towers, Mandaluyong, 197 m (646 ft), 51 storeys, built 1999
- RCBC Plaza Yuchengco Tower, Makati, 191.7 m (629 ft), 46 storeys, built 2001
- One San Miguel Avenue, Mandaluyong, 183 m (600 ft), 38 storeys, built 2001
- LKG Tower, Makati, 180 m (591 ft), 54 storeys, built 2000
- Shang Grand Tower, Makati, 180 m (591 ft), 46 storeys, built 2006
- Pacific Plaza Towers, Taguig, 178.9 m (587 ft), 53 storeys, built 2001
- Atlanta Center, San Juan City, 178.9 m (587 ft)
- One Roxas Triangle, Makati, 174.3 m (572 ft), 51 storeys, built 2000
- Robinsons Summit Center, Makati, 174 m (571 ft), 38 storeys, built 2001
- The Enterprise Center Tower 1, Makati, 171.9 m (564 ft), 40 storeys, built 2001
- The Residences at Greenbelt - Laguna Tower, 171 m (561 ft), 48 storeys, built 2008
- RCBC Plaza Tower 2, Makati, 170 m (558 ft), 41 storeys, built 2001
- The Stratford Residences, Makati, 312 m (1,024 ft), 76 storeys, expected completion: 2014
- Metrobank Grand Hyatt Residences, Taguig, 318 m 1043 ft 66 storeys, expected completion 2017
- Discovery Primea, Makati, 250 m (820 ft), 68 storeys, under construction (EC 2014)
- The Knightsbridge Residences, Makati, 250 m (820 ft), 60 storeys, under construction (EC 2013)

=== Qatar ===
- Aspire Tower, 318 m (1,043 ft), Doha
- Al Jamiliyah TV Transmitter, Large Mast, Al Jamiliyah, 321.9 m (1,056 ft)

=== Saudi Arabia ===
- Jeddah Tower, Jeddah, 1,008 m (3,307 ft)
- Abraj Al Bait Towers, Mecca, 601 m (1,972 ft)
- Qurayyat Transmitter, Mast 1, Qurayyat, 468 m (1,535 ft)
- Qurayyat Transmitter, Mast 2, Qurayyat, 458 m (1,503 ft)
- Kingdom Centre, Riyadh, 302 m (991 ft)
- Al Faisaliyah Center, Riyadh, 280 m (919 ft)
- Jeddah TV Tower, Jeddah, 250 m (820 ft)
- National Commercial Bank, Jeddah, 235 m (771 ft)
- Jeddah City Hall, Jeddah, 220 m (722 ft)
- Islamic Development Bank, Jeddah, 210 m (689 ft)
- Riyadh TV Tower, Riyadh, 170 m (558 ft)

=== Singapore ===
- Guoco Tower, 2016, 290 m (951 ft)
- OUB Centre, 1986, 280 m (919 ft)
- Republic Plaza, 1996, 280 m (919 ft)
- UOB Plaza One, 1992, 280 m (919 ft)
- Capital Tower, 2000, 253 m (830 ft)
- Skysuites @ Anson, 2014, 250 m (820 ft)
- Altez, 2014, 250 m (820 ft)
- One Raffles Quay North Tower, 2009, 245 m (804 ft)
- The Sail @ Marina Bay, 2009, 245 m (804 ft)
- Marina Bay Financial Centre, 2009, 245 m (804 ft)
- Ocean Financial Centre, 2011, 245 m (804 ft)
- CapitaGreen, 2014, 242 m (794 ft)
- 8 Shenton Way, 1986, 235 m (771 ft)
- Swissôtel The Stamford, 1986, 226 m (741 ft)

=== South Korea ===
- Lotte World Tower, Seoul, 123 floors, 555 m (1,821 ft) (tallest building in South Korea and 5th tallest in the world since 2016)
- Northeast Asia Trade Tower, Incheon, 68 floors, 305.1 m (1,001 ft) (topped out, opens March 2011, second tallest building in South Korea)
- AIG Main Tower, Seoul, 80 floors, 300 m (984 ft)
- Samsung Tower Palace (Tower G), Seoul, 73 floors, 264 m (866 ft), completed in 2004
- Mok-dong Hyperion I, Seoul, 69 floors, 256 m (840 ft)
- 63 Building, Seoul, 60 floors, 249 m (817 ft) (completed 1985)

=== Sri Lanka ===
- Lotus Tower Transmission Tower, 350 m (1,148 ft)
- The One: The One Tower, Residential 376 m (1,234 ft)
- The One: Ritz Carlton Hotel and Residences 326 m (1,070 ft)
- Altair:Straight Tower 240 m (787 ft)
- Grand Hyatt 229 m (751 ft)
- Altair: Sloping Tower 209 m (686 ft)
- One Galle Face: Residential Tower 1 194 m (636 ft)
- One Galle Face: Residential Tower 2 194 m (636 ft)
- Clearpoint Residencies 184 m (604 ft)
- Colombo City Centre 183 m (600 ft)
- Kokavil Tower 174 m (571 ft)
- World Trade Center Colombo 152 m (499 ft)
- Jetavanaramaya Stupa, 120 m (394 ft)
- Royal Park Tower 1 120 m (394 ft)
- Royal Park Tower 2 120 m (394 ft)

=== Syria ===
- Mount Qarrah Chouk TV Mast, Tepke, 300.2 m (985 ft)
- Damascus Tower, Damascus, 120.2 m (394 ft)
- Dedeman Hotel, Damascus 70.1 m (230 ft)

=== Taiwan ===
- Taipei 101, Taipei, 508 m (1,667 ft)
- Tuntex Sky Tower, Kaohsiung, 347 m (1,138 ft)
- Taipei Sky Tower, Taipei, 280 m (919 ft)
- Taipei Nan Shan Plaza, Taipei, 272 m (892 ft)
- Farglory THE ONE, Kaohsiung, 267.6 m (878 ft)
- Fubon Xinyi A25, Taipei, 266 m (873 ft)
- Shin Kong Life Tower, Taipei, 244.8 m (803 ft)
- Taichung Commercial Bank Headquarters, Taichung, 225 m (738 ft)
- Chang-Gu World Trade Center, Kaohsiung, 222 m (728 ft)
- Far Eastern Mega Tower, New Taipei, 220 m (722 ft)
- Cathay Landmark, Taipei, 212 m (696 ft)
- Farglory Financial Center, Taipei, 208 m (682 ft)

=== Thailand ===
- MahaNakhon, Bangkok 313 m (1,027 ft)
- Baiyoke Tower II, Bangkok, 304 m (997 ft), tallest hotel in southeast Asia, tallest skyscraper in Thailand
- The River South Tower, Bangkok, 258 m (846 ft)
- State Tower, Bangkok, 247 m (810 ft), southeast Asia's biggest single tower
- Centara Grand at CentralWorld, Bangkok, 235 m (771 ft)
- Reflection Jomtien Beach Oceanfront Tower, Sattahip, 234 m (768 ft)
- The Met, Bangkok, 231 m (758 ft)
- Empire Tower I, Bangkok, 227 m (745 ft)
- Jewelry Trade Center, Bangkok, 221 m (725 ft)
- The Pano, Bangkok, 220 m (722 ft)

=== Turkmenistan ===
- Turkmenistan Tower, Ashgabat, 211 m (692 ft)
- Monument to the Constitution, Ashgabat 185 m (607 ft)
- Independence Monument, Ashgabat 118 m (387 ft)

=== Uzbekistan ===
- Tashkent Tower, Tashkent, 375 m (1,230 ft)
- Chimney of Syrdarya Power Plant, Syrdarya, 350 m (1,148 ft)
- Uchkizil TV Mast, Termez, 350 m (1,148 ft)

=== United Arab Emirates ===
- Burj Khalifa, Dubai, 829.8 m (2,722 ft)
- Dubai Creek Tower, Dubai, 828 m (2,717 ft)
- Emirates Office Tower, Dubai, 355 m (1,165 ft)
- Al Mafraq Transmitter, Large Mast, Abu Dhabi, 340.5 m (1,117 ft)
- Burj al-Arab, Dubai, 321 m (1,053 ft)
- Al Jarf TV Mast, Jebel Ali, 307.5 m (1,009 ft)
- Abu Dhabi Investment Authority Tower, Abu Dhabi, 185 m (607 ft)
- NBAD Tower, Abu Dhabi, 173 m (568 ft)
- Baynunah Hilton Tower, Abu Dhabi, 165 m (541 ft)
- Etisalat HQ Tower, Abu Dhabi, 160 m (525 ft)
- Abu Dhabi Commercial Bank (ADCB) Tower, Abu Dhabi, 116 m (381 ft)
- Marina 101, Dubai Marina, Dubai, 426.5 m (1,399 ft)
- Princess Tower, Dubai Marina, Dubai, 414 m (1,358 ft)
- 23 Marina, Dubai Marina, Dubai, 395 m (1,296 ft)
- Elite Residence, Dubai Marina, Dubai, 380 m (1,247 ft)
- Rose Tower, Dubai, 333 m (1,093 ft)

=== Vietnam ===
1. Landmark 81 461.2 metres (1,513 ft), Ho Chi Minh City, completed in 2018
2. Landmark 72, 336 m (1,102 ft), Hanoi, completed in 2011
3. Lotte Center Hanoi, Hanoi, 267 metres (876 ft), completed in 2014
4. Bitexco Financial Tower, 262.5 m (861 ft), Saigon, completed in 2010
5. Bình Dương Television Transmitter, 252 m (827 ft), Bình Dương Province, completed in 2005
6. Ho Chi Minh city Transmitter, 250 m (820 ft), Saigon, completed 2009
7. Keangnam Hanoi Landmark Tower|Keangnam Hanoi Landmark Tower 2]], 212 m (696 ft), Hanoi, completed in 2011
8. VTV-Binh Duong Transmitter, 184 m (604 ft), Bình Dương Province
9. Nam Định Transmitter, 180 m (590 ft), Nam Định, completed in 2010
10. Cần Thơ Transmitter, 170 m (560 ft), Cần Thơ, completed in 2003
11. Saigon Times Square, 163 m (535 ft), Ho Chi Minh City, completed in 2011
12. Saigon Trade Center, 160 m (520 ft), Ho Chi Minh City, completed in 1997
13. Trung Hoa Nhan Chinh, 136 m (446 ft), Hanoi, completed in 2007
14. Saigon Pearl-Ruby Tower, 135 m (443 ft), Ho Chi Minh City
15. Sunrise City Block I, 131 m (430 ft), Ho Chi Minh City, completed in 2011
16. M5 Tower, 124.6 m (409 ft), Hanoi
17. Hung Vuong Plaza || 120 m (390 ft), Ho Chi Minh City, completed in 2008

== Europe ==
=== Andorra ===
- Caldea, Escaldes-Engordany, 80 m (262 ft), 18 floors
- Tour Zénith, Escaldes-Engordany, approximately 60 m (197 ft), 20 floors
- A Tower, Escaldes-Engordany, approximately 60 m (197 ft), 20 floors
- La Torre, Escaldes-Engordany, approximately 60 m (197 ft), 20 floors
- Terrasses d'Emprivat, Escaldes-Engordany, approximately 60 m (197 ft), 20 floors
- Le Diamant, Andorra la Vella, approximately 33 m (108 ft)
- Meritxell 29, Andorra la Vella, approximately 33 m (108 ft)
- Andorra Palace of Justice, Andorra la Vella, approximately 33 m (108 ft)
- Parliament of Andorra, Andorra la Vella, approximately 30 m (98 ft)
- Olimpia, Andorra la Vella, approximately 27 m (89 ft)

=== Albania ===
- Shijak Mediumwave Broadcasting Mast, Shijak, 130 m (427 ft)
- ARRT-Mast of Fllake transmitter. Fllake, 126 m (413 ft)

=== Austria ===
- Mediumwave transmission mast Bisamberg, 265 m (869 ft)
- Donauturm, 252 m (827 ft)
- Millennium Tower Wien, 202 m (663 ft)
- Stephansdom, 137 m (449 ft)

=== Belarus ===
- Sasnovy Longwave Radio Mast, Sosnovy, 353.5 m (1,160 ft)
- Kolodischi TV Mast, Kolodischi, 350 m (1,148 ft)
- Ushachi TV Mast, Ushachi, 350 m (1,148 ft)
- Polykovichi TV Mast, Mahilyow/Polykovichi, 350 m (1,148 ft)
- Novaya Strazha TV Mast, Slonim, 350 m (1,148 ft)
- Smetanichi TV Mast, Smetanichi, 350 m (1,148 ft)
- Vileyka VLF transmitter, Vileyka, central masts, 305 m (1,001 ft)
- Vileyka VLF transmitter, Vileyka, ring masts, 270 m (886 ft)
- Minsk International Financial Center, Minsk, 168 m (551 ft)
- Lazurit Residential Complex, Minsk, 138 m (453 ft)

=== Belgium ===
- VRT Tower Egem, 305 m (1,001 ft)
- VRT Tower, 300 m (984 ft)
- South Tower (Brussels), Brussels, 150 m (492 ft)
- Finance Tower, 145 m (476 ft)
- Rogier Tower, 137 m (449 ft)
- Madou Plaza, 120 m (394 ft)
- Tour Astro, 107 m (351 ft)
- North Galaxy, 107 m (351 ft)
- Belgacom Towers, 102 m (335 ft)

=== Bosnia and Herzegovina ===
Buildings

- Avaz Twist Tower, Sarajevo, 175 m (574 ft), 42 floors, the tallest building in the Balkans
- Incel Chimney, Banja Luka 150 m (492 ft)
- Bosmal City Center, Sarajevo, 120 m (394 ft), 27 floors, the tallest residential building in the Balkans
- Bosmal City Center second building, Sarajevo, 118 m (387 ft), 25 floors

Chimneys

- Chimney of Ugljevik Thermal Power Plant, Ugljevik 310 m (1,017 ft)
- Chimney of Tuzla Thermal Power Plant, Tuzla 300 m (984 ft)
- Chimney of Kakanj Thermal Power Plant, Kakanj 300 m (984 ft)
- Chimney of Gacko Thermal Power Plant, Gacko 160 m (525 ft)
- Chimney of Stanari Thermal Power Plant, Stanari 150 m (492 ft)

=== Bulgaria ===
- Chimneys of the Maritsa Iztok Complex, 325 m (1,066 ft)
- Chimney of Pirdop copper smelter and refinery, 325 m (1,066 ft)
- Venets Transmitter, 302 m (991 ft)

=== Croatia ===
- Chimney of Plomin Power Station, 340 m (1,115 ft)
- Chimney of TE Rijeka, 250 m (820 ft)
- Zagreb TV Tower, 169 m (554 ft)
- Zagreb Cathedral, 105 m (344 ft)
- Zagrepčanka, 100 m (328 ft)

=== Cyprus ===
- Psimolofou radio mast, 193 m (633 ft)
- Chimney of Vasiliko Power Station, 138 m (453 ft)

=== Czech Republic ===
- Mast of Vysílač Krašov, 347.5 m (1,140 ft)
- Former masts of RKS Liblice 2, 355 m (1,165 ft), demolished in October 15, 2026

=== Denmark ===
- Tommerup transmitter, 321.3 m (1,054 ft)
- Globecom Tower, 378.25 m (1,241 ft) (until 1964: Angissq LORAN-C transmitter, 411.48 m (1,350 ft))

=== Estonia ===
- Koeru TV Mast, 349 m (1,145 ft)
- Valgjärve TV Mast, 347 m (1,138 ft)
- Tallinn TV Tower, 314 m (1,030 ft)
- Pärnu TV Mast, 196 m (643 ft)
- Saint Olaf's church, 123.7 m (406 ft) (was thought to be 159 m (522 ft) in the 16th century, but more recent research suggest this is unlikely)
- Swissotel Tallinn, 117 m (384 ft)
- Radisson SAS Hotel, 103 m (338 ft)

=== Finland ===
- Tallest structure: Hollola TV Mast (Tiirismaa), Hollola, 327 m (1,073 ft)
- Haapavesi TV Mast, Haapavesi, 327 m (1,073 ft)

=== France ===
- Allouis longwave transmitter, 350 m (1,148 ft)
- Masts of HWU transmitter, 350 m (1,148 ft)
- Eiffel Tower, 330 m (1,083 ft)
- The Link, 242 m (794 ft)
- Tour First, 231 m (758 ft)
- Tour Montparnasse, 209 m (686 ft)
- Millau Viaduct, 270 m (886 ft) clearance, 341 m (1,119 ft) at summit

=== Germany ===
- TV Tower Berlin, 368.03 m (1,207 ft)
- Longwave transmission mast Zehlendorf, 359.7 m (1,180 ft)
- Longwave transmission masts Donebach, 363 m (1,191 ft)
- Directional Radio Mast Berlin-Frohnau, 358.7 m (1,177 ft), demolished in 2009
- Commerzbank Tower, tallest building in Europe 1997–2004, 259 m (850 ft) (300.1 m (985 ft) with the antenna)
- Ulm Münster, the tallest cathedral church in the world, 161.53 m (530 ft)

=== Greece ===
- Kato Souli LF Transmission Mast, 250 m (820 ft)
- Athens ERA-1 broadcasting mast, 210 m (689 ft)
- Athens Tower, 103 m (338 ft)

=== Hungary ===
- Lakihegy Tower, 314 m (1,030 ft)

=== Iceland ===
- Longwave radio mast Hellissandur, Gufuskálar, 412 m (1,352 ft)
- Naval Radio Transmitter Facility Grindavik, Mast 1, Grindavík, 304.8 m (1,000 ft)
- Longwave radio mast Eiðar, Eiðar, 220 m (722 ft)
- Naval Radio Transmitter Facility Grindavik, Mast 2, Grindavík, 182.9 m (600 ft)

=== Ireland ===
- RTÉ Radio 1 Medium Wave guyed mast, Tullamore, 290 m (951 ft), tallest structure in the republic of Ireland
- Clarkstown Radio Transmitter, 245 m (804 ft)
- Mullaghanish Transmitter, 220 m (722 ft)
- Poolbeg Chimney 2, 208 m (682 ft)
- Poolbeg Chimney 1, 207 m (679 ft)
- Mooneypoint power station chimneys, 218 m (715 ft)
- Truskmore Transmitter, 167.64 m (550 ft)
- Three Rock Transmitter, 152.4 m (500 ft)
- Aghada Power Station Chimney, 152 m (499 ft)
- Tarbert Power Station Chimney, 151 m (495 ft)
- Great Island Power Station Chimney, 138 m (453 ft)
- Kippure Mountain Transmitter, 127 m (417 ft)
- Kinnegad Cement Factory Chimney, 125.3 m (411 ft)

=== Italy ===
- Transmitter Caltanissetta, Caltanisetta, 282 m (925 ft)
- Pylons of Messina, Messina, 232 m (761 ft)
- Unicredit Tower, Milan, 231 m (758 ft)
- Allianz Tower, Milan, 209 m (686 ft)
- Generali Tower, Milan, 191.5 m (628 ft)
- Torre Telecom, Milan, 187 m (614 ft)
- Libeskind Tower, Milan, 175 m (574 ft)
- Mole Antonelliana, Turin, 167 m (548 ft)
- Palazzo Lombardia, Milan, 161 m (528 ft)
- Torre Solaria, Milan, 147 m (482 ft)
- Torre Diamante, Milan, 140 m (459 ft)
- Torre Telecom Italia, Naples, 128.9 m (423 ft)
- Torre Pontina, Latina, 128 m (420 ft)
- Pirelli Tower, Milan, 127.1 m (417 ft)
- Torri Enel, Naples, 123 m (404 ft)
- A2A Termovalorizzatore, Brescia, 120 m (394 ft)
- Torre Francesco e Torre Saverio, Naples, 119 m (390 ft)
- Crystal Palace, Brescia, 110 m (361 ft)
- Matitone, Genoa, 109 m (358 ft)

=== Latvia ===
- Highest highrises:
  - Z-Towers, Riga, 135 m (443 ft)
  - Saules akmens, Riga, 123 m (404 ft)
  - Panorama Plaza II, Riga, 114 m (374 ft)
  - Latvian Academy of Sciences, Riga, 107 m (351 ft)
  - Latvijas Televizija Building, Riga, 89 m (292 ft)
- Highest TV and radio broadcasting towers and transmission masts:
  - Riga Radio and TV Tower, Riga, 368 m (1,207 ft)
  - Valmiera TV Tower, Valmiera, 204 m (669 ft)
  - Cesvaine TV Tower, Cesvaine, 204 m (669 ft)
  - Daugavpils TV Tower (ru), Daugavpils, 204 m (669 ft)
  - Rezekne TV Tower, Rezekne, 204 m (669 ft)
  - Dundaga transmission mast, Dundaga, 203 m (666 ft)
  - Kuldīga TV Tower, Kuldīga, 180 m (591 ft)
  - Upīškalns transmission masts, Upīškalns, 230 m (755 ft), 205 m (673 ft), 205 m (673 ft)
  - Aluksne transmission mast, Aluksne, 168 m (551 ft)
  - Viesite transmission mast, Viesite, 156 m (512 ft)
  - Ulbroka transmission mast, Ulbroka, 205 m (673 ft)
  - Māļi TV Tower, Māļi, 121 m (397 ft)
  - Liepāja TV Tower, Liepāja, 100 m (328 ft)

=== Liechtenstein ===
- Erbi Radio Tower, Vaduz, 81.26 m (267 ft)

=== Lithuania ===
- Vilnius TV Tower, Vilnius, 326.4 m (1,071 ft)
- Europa Tower, Vilnius, 128.9 m (423 ft)
- Pilsotas, Klaipėda, 112 m (367 ft)

=== Luxembourg ===
- FM- and TV-mast Hosingen, 300 m (984 ft)
- Beidweiler Longwave Transmitter, 290 m (951 ft)
- Dudelange Radio Tower, 285 m (935 ft)
- European Court of Justice Towers, Luxembourg City, 103 m (338 ft)

=== Malta ===
- Chimney of Delimara Power Station, 150 m (492 ft)

=== Moldova ===
- Strășeni TV Mast, Strășeni, 355 m (1,165 ft)
- Mîndreștii Noi TV Mast, Mîndreștii Noi, 327 m (1,073 ft)

=== Monaco ===
- Odeon Tower, La Rousse/Saint Roman, 170 m (558 ft), 49 floors
- Le Millefiori, Saint Michel, 110 m (364 ft), 37 floors
- L'Annonciade, La Rousse/Saint Roman, 110 m (364 ft), 35 floors
- Parc Saint Roman, La Rousse/Saint Roman, 107 m (354 ft), 35 floors
- Columbia Palace, Larvotto, 104 m (344 ft), 34 floors

=== Montenegro ===
- Chimney of Pljevlja Thermal Power Plant, 250 m (820 ft)
- Mala Rijeka viaduct, 200 m (656 ft)
- Đurđevića Tara Bridge, 172 m (564 ft)
- Mratinje Dam, 200 m (656 ft)

=== Netherlands ===
- Gerbrandy Tower, IJsselstein, 366.8 m (1,203 ft) (1961–1987: 382.5 m (1,255 ft), 1987–2007: 375 m (1,230 ft))
- De Zalmhaven, Rotterdam, 215.0 m (705 ft)
- Euromast, Rotterdam, 185 m (607 ft)
- Maastoren, Rotterdam, 165 m (541 ft)
- New Orleans, Rotterdam, 159 m (522 ft)
- Delftse Poort, Rotterdam, 151 m (495 ft)
- Westpoint Tower, Tilburg, 143 m (469 ft)
- Hoftoren, The Hague, 142 m (466 ft)
- Montevideo, Rotterdam, 139 m (456 ft)
- Rembrandttoren, Amsterdam, 135 m (443 ft)
- Achmeatoren (Achmea insurance tower), Leeuwarden, 115 m (377 ft)
- Dom Tower, built 14th century, Utrecht, 112.5 m (369 ft)

=== North Macedonia ===
- Chimney of REK Bitola, Novaci, 250 m (820 ft)
- Chimney of TPP Oslomej, Oslomej, 180 m (591 ft)
- Vodno Telecommunication Tower, Skopje, 155 m (509 ft)
- Cevahir Towers, Skopje, 142 m (466 ft)

=== Norway ===
- Troll A platform, North Sea, 472 m (1,549 ft)
- Longwave transmission mast Ingoy, 362 m (1,188 ft)
- Høiåsmasten, Halden, 320 m (1,050 ft)

Tallest buildings:

- Oslo Plaza Hotel, Hotel in Oslo, 117 m (384 ft)
- Posthuset, Officebuilding in Oslo, 110 m (361 ft)

=== Poland ===
Tallest structure:

- Warsaw Radio Mast, 646.38 m (2,121 ft), destroyed in 1991; tallest structure built in the world until 2010
- FM- and TV-mast Olsztyn-Pieczewo, 360 m (1,181 ft)

Tallest wooden structure:

- Gliwice Radio Tower, 1935, 118 m (387 ft), tallest existing construction built of wood

Tallest building:

- Varso Tower, 2022, 310 m (1,017 ft)
- Palace of Culture and Science, 1955, 231 m (758 ft)

=== Portugal ===
- Radio antenna in Muge, Salvaterra de Magos, 265 m (869 ft)
- Refinery's chimney in Sines, 234 m (768 ft)
- Sines Thermal Power Plant's twin chimneys, 225 m (738 ft)
- Setúbal Thermal Power Plant's twin chimneys, 200 m (656 ft)
- 25 de Abril Bridge, Lisbon, 190.5 m (625 ft)
- Vila Nova de Gaia Communications Tower, 177 m (581 ft)
- Bridge on road IC8, near Sertã, 170 m (558 ft)
- Vasco da Gama Bridge, Lisbon, 155 m (509 ft)

=== Romania ===
- Chimney of Phoenix Copper Smelter, the tallest structure in Romania, 351.5 m (1,153 ft), and among the tallest in Europe
- Romag-Termo Power Plant, Chimney North, 300 m (984 ft)
- Chimney of CET Brașov, 280 m (919 ft)
- Bod transmitter, 250 m (820 ft)
- Galaţi TV Tower, 150 m (492 ft)
- Floreasca City Center, 137 m (449 ft)
- Globalworth Tower, Bucharest, 2016, 118 m (387 ft)

=== Russia ===
- Ostankino Tower, 540 m (1,772 ft)
- Lakhta Center, 462.7 m (1,518 ft)
- Dudinka CHAYKA-Mast, Dudinka, 462 m (1,516 ft)
- Taymylyr CHAYKA-Mast (demolished), Taymylyr, 462 m (1,516 ft)
- Inta CHAYKA-Mast, Inta, 460 m (1,509 ft)
- Central Mast of Imeretinskaya VLF-transmitter, Imeretinskaya, 425 m (1,394 ft)
- Chimney of Berezovskaya GRES, Sharypovo, 370 m (1,214 ft)
- Tambov TV Mast, Tambow, 360 m (1,181 ft)
- Novosokolniki TV Mast, Novosokolniki, 360 m (1,181 ft)
- Lipetsk TV Mast, Lipetsk, 354.6 m (1,163 ft)
- Mosolovo TV Mast, Mosolovo, 350 m (1,148 ft)
- Lipin Bor TV Mast, Lipin Bor, 350 m (1,148 ft)
- Selizharovo TV Mast, Selizharovo, 350 m (1,148 ft)
- Pinerovka TV Mast, Pinerovka, 350 m (1,148 ft)
- Yershov TV Mast, Yershov, 350 m (1,148 ft)
- Tula TV Mast, Tula, 350 m (1,148 ft)
- Rodniki TV Mast, Rodniki, 350 m (1,148 ft)
- Novo-Bykovo TV Mast, Vladimir, 350 m (1,148 ft)
- Volga TV Mast, Rybinsk, 350 m (1,148 ft)
- Kanevskaya TV Mast, Kanevskaya, 350 m (1,148 ft)
- Stavropol TV Mast, Stavropol, 350 m (1,148 ft)
- Ust-Kalmanka TV Mast, Ust-Kalmanka, 350 m (1,148 ft)
- Livny TV Mast, Livny, 350 m (1,148 ft)
- Sovetsky TV Mast, Sovetsky, Mari El Republic, 350 m (1,148 ft)
- Smogiri TV Mast, Smolensk, 350 m (1,148 ft)
- Varaksino TV Mast, Izhevsk, 350 m (1,148 ft)
- Surgut TV Mast, Surgut, 350 m (1,148 ft)
- Tsivilsk TV Mast, Tsivilsk, 350 m (1,148 ft)
- Galich TV Mast, Galich, 350 m (1,148 ft)
- Belyy Yar TV Mast, Belyy Yar, 350 m (1,148 ft)
- Alexandrovsk-Sakhalinsky CHAYKA-Mast, Soboli, 350 m (1,148 ft)
- Petropavlovsk-Kamchatsky CHAYKA-Mast, Sokoch, 350 m (1,148 ft)
- Ussuriysk CHAYKA-Mast, Pad' Levaja, 350 m (1,148 ft)
- Bakaly TV Mast, Bakaly, 348 m (1,142 ft)
- Proletariy TV Mast, Proletariy, 347 m (1,138 ft)
- Bobrov transmitter, Bobrov, 331 m (1,086 ft)
- Chimney of Permskaya GRES, Dobryanka, 330 m (1,083 ft)
- Chimney of Reftinskaya GRES, Reftinskiy, 330 m (1,083 ft)
- Tower of Bridge to Russky Island, Vladivostok, 320.9 m (1,053 ft)
- Chimney of Ryazanskaya GRES, Ryazan, 320 m (1,050 ft)
- Chimney of Tobolsk TEC, Tobolsk, 320 m (1,050 ft)
- Chimneys of Kirishi Power Station, Kirishi, 320 m (1,050 ft)
- Obninsk Meteorological tower, Obninsk, 315 m (1,033 ft)
- St. Petersburg TV Tower, Saint Petersburg, 310 m (1,017 ft)
- Chimney of Troitskaya TEC, Troitsk, 300 m (984 ft)
- Mast ofMoscow Radio Centre 13, Balashiha, 300 m (984 ft)
- Naberezhnaya Tower C, 268 m (879 ft)
- Triumph-Palace, 264 m (866 ft)
- Main building of Moscow State University, 1953, 240 m (787 ft)

=== Serbia ===
Buildings

- Belgrade Tower, Belgrade, 168 m (551 ft)
- West 65, Belgrade, 155 m (509 ft)
- Skyline AFI Tower Belgrade, Belgrade, 132 m (433 ft)
- Western City Gate, Belgrade, 117 m (384 ft)
- Ušće Tower 1, Belgrade, 115 m (377 ft)
- Ušće Tower 2, Belgrade, 104 m (341 ft)
- Beograđanka, Belgrade, 101 m (331 ft)

Chimneys, and other structures

- Chimney of TPP Kostolac B, Kostolac, 295 m (968 ft)
- Chimney of TPP Nikola Tesla B, Obrenovac, 280 m (919 ft)
- Stubline transmitter, Stubline, 225 m (738 ft)
- Chimney of TPP Nikola Tesla A, Obrenovac, 220 m (722 ft)
- Subotica TV Mast, Subotica, 219 m (719 ft)
- Avala Tower 205 m (673 ft)
- Ada Bridge, Belgrade, 200 m (656 ft)
- Iriški Venac Tower, 210 m (689 ft)

=== Slovenia ===
- Trbovlje Chimney, 360 m (1,181 ft)

=== Slovakia ===
- Dubnik Transmitter, Dubnik, 318 m (1,043 ft)
- Suchá Hora transmitter, Suchá Hora, 312 m (1,024 ft)
- Chimney of Novaky Power Plant, Nováky, 300 m (984 ft)
- Chimney of Duslo, Šaľa, 240 m (787 ft)
- Kamzik TV Tower, Bratislava, 200 m (656 ft)
- Chimney of Novaky Power Plant-B, Units 1 + 2, Nováky, 150 m (492 ft)
- Chimney of Heating station, Bratislava, 120 m (394 ft)
- Nivy Tower, Bratislava, 125 m (410 ft), tallest building in Slovakia
- Klingerka Residential Tower, Bratislava, 116 m (381 ft)
- Sky Park Tower (Tower C01), Bratislava, 119 m (390 ft)
- National Bank of Slovakia, NBS, Bratislava, 111 m (364 ft)
- Slovak Television Building, Bratislava, 108 m (354 ft)
- Panorama City Tower 1, Bratislava, 112.6 m (369 ft)
- Panorama City Tower 2, Bratislava, 112.2 m (368 ft)
- Tower 115, Bratislava, 104 m (341 ft)
- City Business Center 1, Bratislava, 107 m (351 ft)
- Glória Tower, Bratislava, 100 m (328 ft)
- Millennium Tower II, Bratislava, 100 m (328 ft)
- VÚB Centrála, Bratislava, 88.1 m (289 ft)

=== Spain ===
- Torreta de Guardamar, Guardamar del Segura, 370 m (1,214 ft)
- Endesa Termic, As Pontes, Galicia, 356 m (1,168 ft)
- Torre de Collserola, Barcelona, architect Norman Foster, 13 storeys, 152 m (499 ft), 288 m (945 ft) with antenna
- Torre Caja Madrid, Madrid, architect Norman Foster, 45 storeys, 250 m (820 ft), inauguration in 2007
- Torre de Cristal, Madrid, architects Ortiz & De León and César Pelli, 52 storeys, 249 m (817 ft), inauguration in 2007
- Torre Sacyr Vallehermoso, Madrid, architects Rubio & Álvarez, 52 storeys, 236 m (774 ft), inauguration in 2007
- Torrespaña, Madrid, architect Emilio Fernández Martín de Velasco, 231 m (758 ft)
- Torre Espacio, Madrid, architects Pei Cobb and Reid Fenwick, 53 storeys, 223 m (732 ft), inauguration in 2007
- Gran Hotel Bali, Benidorm, Alicante, Archarchitectitect Antonio Escario, 186 m (610 ft), 210 m (689 ft) with antenna, highest building in Spain (until 2007) and hotel in Europe
- Besòs power termal station, Sant Adrià de Besòs, 3 chimneys each 200 m (656 ft)
- Torre Iberdrola, Bilbao, architect César Pelli, 165 m (541 ft)
- Torre Lugano, Benidorm, Alicante, 158 m (518 ft)
- Torre Picasso, Madrid, architect Minoru Yamasaki, 45 storeys, 157 m (515 ft)
- Torre Mapfre, Barcelona, architects Ortiz & De León, 44 storeys, 154 m (505 ft)
- Hotel Arts, Barcelona, architects Skidmore, Owings & Merrill, 43 storeys, 154 m (505 ft)
- Torre Agbar, Barcelona, architect Jean Nouvel, 32 storeys, 144 m (472 ft)

=== Sweden ===
- Storbergsmasten, Hudiksvall, 335 m (1,099 ft)
- Jupukkamasten, Pajala, 335 m (1,099 ft)
- Fårhultsmasten, Västervik, 335 m (1,099 ft)
- Gungvalamasten, Karlshamn, 335 m (1,099 ft)
- Vännäs TV Tower, Vännäs, 323 m (1,060 ft)
- Turning Torso, Malmö, 2005, 190 m (623 ft)
- Kaknästornet, Stockholm, 1967, 155 m (509 ft)

=== Switzerland ===
- Grande Dixence Dam, Hérémence, 285 m (935 ft)
- Towers and masts:
  - TV Tower Sankt Chrischona, 250 m (820 ft), near Basel
  - Transmitter Monte Ceneri, 220 m (722 ft), on Monte Ceneri
  - Blosenbergturm, 217 m (712 ft), completed 1937, near Beromünster
  - Radio tower Schaffhausen-Cholfirst, near Schaffhausen
  - Sottens transmitter, 188 m (617 ft), completed 1989, near Sottens; the one replaced was 190 m (623 ft)
  - Uetliberg TV-tower, 186.7 m (613 ft), completed 1990, on Uetliberg above Zürich
- Prime Tower, 126 m (413 ft), Zürich, completed 2011, Switzerland's tallest building
- Messeturm Basel, 105 m (344 ft), in Basel, completed 2003, the country's second tallest building
- Münster of Bern, 100 m (328 ft), in Bern, completed 1893, tallest church tower
- Pylon in the artificial lake of Santa Maria, 75 meters, in Lake Santa Maria, completed 1949

=== Turkey ===
- Denizköy VLF transmitter, 380 m (1,247 ft)
- Skyland Office Istanbul, Istanbul, 2017, 284.1 m (932 ft)
- Skyland Residence Istanbul, Istanbul, 2017, 284.1 m (932 ft)
- Diamond of Istanbul (under construction), Istanbul, estimated completion 2015, 270 m (886 ft)
- Sapphire of Istanbul, Istanbul, 2010, 261 m (856 ft)
- Polatli transmitter, 250 m (820 ft)
- Endem TV Tower, Istanbul, 2002, 236 m (774 ft)
- Küçük Çamlıca TV Radio Tower, Istanbul, 2020, 218 m (715 ft)
- Mistral Office Tower, Izmir, 2017, 216 m (709 ft)
- Spine Towers, Istanbul, 2013, 202 m (663 ft)
- Folkart Towers, Izmir, 2014, 200 m (656 ft)
- Varyap Meridian Tower 1, Istanbul, 2011, 52 floors, 198 m (650 ft)
- Anthill Residence Tower 1, Istanbul, 2010, 54 floors, 195 m (640 ft)
- Anthill Residence Tower 2, Istanbul, 2010, 54 floors, 186 m (610 ft)
- Allianz Tower, Istanbul, 2014, 44 floors, 186 m (610 ft)
- One Tower, Ankara, 2016, 44 floors, 185 m (607 ft)
- İş Kuleleri, Istanbul, 2000, 52 floors, 181 m (594 ft) (first tower)
- Varyap Meridian Tower 2, Istanbul, 2011, 45 floors, 180 m (591 ft)
- Taksim Group Hotel Mersin, Mersin, 1987, 52 floors, 176.8 m (580 ft)
- Sisli Plaza, Istanbul, 2006, 46 floors, 170 m (558 ft)
- Tekstilkent Plaza 1, 2000, two towers both 44 floors, Istanbul, 168 m (551 ft)
- Tekstilkent Plaza 2, 2000, two towers both 44 floors, Istanbul, 168 m (551 ft)
- Çamlıca TV Tower, Istanbul, 1972, 166 m (545 ft)
- Selenium Twins 1, 2008, two towers both 34 floors, Istanbul, 165 m (541 ft)
- Selenium Twins 2, 2008, two towers both 34 floors, Istanbul, 165 m (541 ft)
- Selçuklu (Seljuk) Tower, 2006, two towers both 42 floors, Konya, 163 m (535 ft)
- Portakal Residence, 2009, 37 floors, Ankara, 160 m (525 ft)
- My Towerland 1, 2010, 42 floors, Istanbul, 160 m (525 ft)
- Rixos Bomonti Residence, 2010, 42 floors, Istanbul, 159 m (522 ft)
- Akbank Tower, 1993, 39 floors, Istanbul, 158 m (518 ft)
- Istanbul Trump Towers 1, 2010, 39 floors, Istanbul, 155 m (509 ft)
- Uprise Elite, 2010, 42 floors, Istanbul, 154 m (505 ft)
- Süzer Plaza Ritz-Carlton, 1998, 34 floors, Istanbul, 153.65 m (504 ft)
- Polat Tower Residence, 2001, 40 floors, Istanbul, 152.5 m (500 ft)

=== Ukraine ===
- Kyiv TV Tower, 385 m (1,263 ft)
- Donetsk TV Mast, 360 m (1,181 ft)
- TV Tower Vinnytsia, 354 m (1,161 ft)
- Chimneys of Kharkiv TEC-5, 330 m (1,083 ft)

=== United Kingdom ===
- Skelton Mast, 365 m (1,198 ft), tallest structure
- The Shard, London, Greater London, 309 m (1,014 ft), completed in 2012
- Wenvoe Mast, Cardiff, Wales, 260.7 m (855 ft), completed in 1985
- Heron Tower, London, Greater London, 230 m (755 ft), completed in 2010
- Leadenhall Building, London, Greater London, 225 m (738 ft), completed in 2014
- 8 Canada Square, London, Greater London, 200 m (656 ft), completed in 2002
- 25 Canada Square, London, Greater London, 200 m (656 ft), completed in 2001
- Tower 42, London, Greater London, 183 m (600 ft), completed in 1980
- St George Wharf Tower, London, Greater London, 181 m (594 ft), completed in 2014
- 30 St Mary Axe, London, Greater London, 180 m (591 ft), completed in 2003
- Beetham Tower, Manchester, North West England, 169 m (554 ft)
- Broadgate Tower, London, Greater London, 161 m (528 ft), completed in 2008
- 20 Fenchurch Street, London, Greater London, 160 m (525 ft), completed in 2014
- One Churchill Place, London, Greater London, 156 m (512 ft), completed in 2004
- 25 Bank Street, London, Greater London, 153 m (502 ft), completed 2003
- 40 Bank Street, London, Greater London, 153 m (502 ft), completed in 2003
- 10 Upper Bank Street, London, Greater London, 151 m (495 ft), completed in 2003
- Strata SE1, London, Greater London, 148 m (486 ft), completed in 2010
- Pan Peninsula East Tower, London, Greater London, 147 m (482 ft), completed in 2008
- Guy's Tower, London, Greater London, 143 m (469 ft), completed in 1974
- The Landmark East Tower, London, Greater London, 140 m (459 ft), completed in 2010
- West Tower, Liverpool, North West England, 140 m (459 ft), completed in 2007
- 150 High Street, Stratford, London, Greater London, 133 m (436 ft), completed in 2012
- 10 Holloway Circus, Birmingham, West Midlands, 130 m (427 ft), completed in 2006
- CityPoint, London, Greater London, 127 m (417 ft), completed in 1967
- Willis Building, London, Greater London, 125 m (410 ft), completed in 2007
- Euston Tower, London, Greater London, 124 m (407 ft), completed in 1970

=== Vatican City ===
- St. Peter's Basilica, Vatican Hill, 137 m (452 ft)

=== Republic of Kosovo ===
- MP Tower, Pristina 167 m (548 ft)

== Oceania ==
=== American Samoa (USA) ===
- Tafuna Telecommunications Building (Tafuna), 12 m (39 ft)

=== Australia ===
- Omega Navigational Mast Woodside, 432 m (1,417 ft) (demolished 2015)
- Mast 0 of Naval Communication Station Harold E. Holt, 389 m (1,276 ft)
- Naval Communication Station Harold E. Holt, 364 m (1,194 ft)
- Q1, 322.5 m (1,058 ft), tallest building in the Southern Hemisphere
- Sydney Tower, 309 m (1,014 ft)
- Australia 108, 316.7 m (1,039 ft), second tallest building in the Southern Hemisphere
- Rialto Towers (often The Rialto), 270 m (886 ft), second tallest reinforced concrete building
- 120 Collins Street, 264 m (866 ft)
- 101 Collins Street, 260 m (853 ft)

=== Fiji (Suva) ===
- WG Friendship Plaza Suva, 115 m (377 ft), the tallest building in Oceania outside Australia and New Zealand
- MHCC Tower, 69 m (226 ft)
- Reserve Bank of Fiji, 65 m (213 ft)

=== Guam (USA) ===
- Oceana Tower II, 115 m (377 ft)

=== New Zealand ===
- Sky Tower (Auckland), 328 m (1,076 ft), the tallest tower (freestanding structure) in the Southern Hemisphere
- Titahi Bay Transmitter, 212 m (696 ft)
- New Plymouth Power Station chimney, New Plymouth, 198 m (650 ft)
- The Pacifica, currently the tallest building in Auckland being constructed 181 metres (594 ft)
- PWC Tower, business skyscraper in Auckland, 180 m (591 ft)
- Vero Center, currently the third tallest building in Auckland, 172 metres (564 ft)
- The Majestic Centre, the tallest building in Wellington, 116 metres (381 ft)

=== Northern Mariana Islands (USA) ===
- Taga Tower, 65 m (213 ft)

=== Papua New Guinea ===
- Noble Center, the tallest building in Papua New Guinea, 100 metres (330 ft)
- Grand Papua Hotel, hotel building and second tallest building in Papua New Guinea, 90 metres (300 ft)
- Star Mountain Plaza, third tallest building in Papua New Guinea, 59 metres (194 ft)
