= Minsk TV tower =

Communications tower in Republic of Belarus

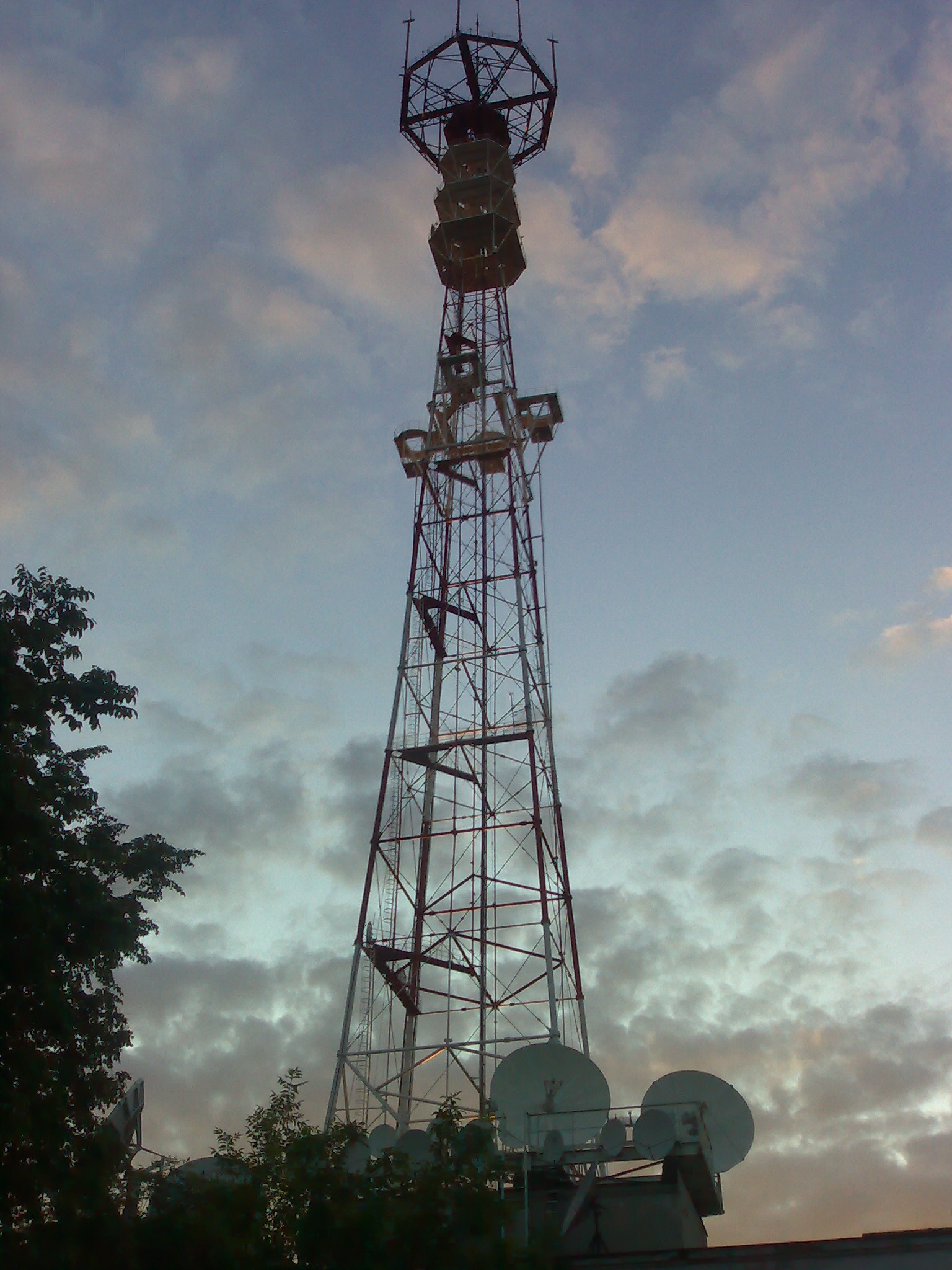
- Interactive map of the Minsk TV tower area

General information
- Status: Completed
- Type: Steel lattice television tower
- Location: Minsk, Republic of Belarus
- Coordinates: 53°54′34″N 27°34′19″E
- Completed: 1956

Height
- Height: 170 m (558 ft)

The Minsk TV tower is a TV tower located in Minsk, Belarus. It is a recognizable landmark of the capital city located near the Victory Square, Minsk.

Its initial height was about 200m, however in July 1976 its top part of 40m was cut off and replaced with a platform with eight antennas. The new height is 170m. This reconstruction was done to the fact that the main TV/radio broadcasting functions were passed to the newly built 350metre tall Kolodischi TV Mast some 15 km off Minsk. The new design was to support radiotelephone communications network.

== History ==
The first broadcast from the tower was made on January 1, 1956.

On October 6, 1967, the Minsk television center for the first time received a full color television signal from Moscow via a radio relay line using the SECAM- 3B system, although at that time there were only 5 color TV sets in Minsk. Two of them were installed at the Minsk TV center to control the radio relay line and the air and it was the employees of the TV center who were the first to see color TV broadcasting. Since September 13, 1974, the television center regularly broadcasts in color.

By 1976, the radio and television broadcasting center had already been moved out of the city and the tower was used only for the operation of mobile television stations and the transmission of programs from Minsk to the new center. Therefore, it was decided to use it also to create a republican radiotelephone communication in the capital. For this, the tower was shortened by almost 40 meters, having carried out a unique operation on the morning of July 13 - a helicopter hovered over the tower. The installers fixed the cables and a minute later the machine, lifting the section, transferred it to a specially equipped site in the area of Komsomolskoye Lake. Although it was possible to dismantle it with the help of a "creeping" crane used in such cases, it would have taken a lot of time and, moreover, it was almost impossible to lift a multi-ton load to such a height. Therefore, for the first time in Minsk this operation took the helicopter " MI-10K ", intended for assembly work (carried out this work in Moscow experienced crew of Belushkin F., N. Seliverstov, G. Provalov and lead engineer A. Chubareva). Further, at a height of about 160 meters, a platform with a diameter of 20 meters was mounted, which consisted of 8 five-ton petals, on which they installed antennas necessary for the operation of a new type of communication.

By the tower there used to be the TV center. Currently this building is occupied by the state-owned TV channels All-National TV and Capital TV.

== See also ==
- Lattice tower
