= Flurlingen =

- Municipality
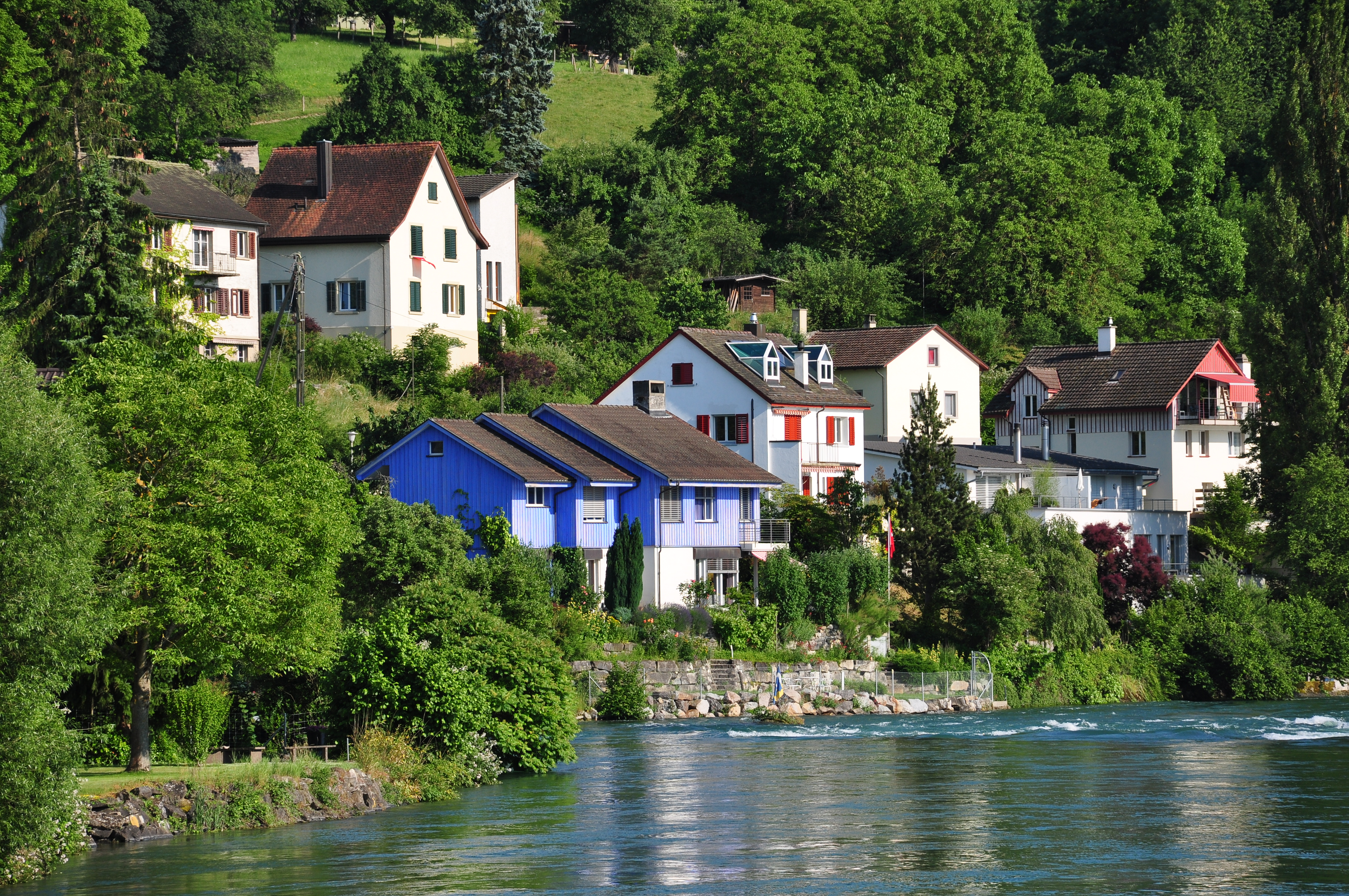

- Flag Coat of arms
- Location of Flurlingen
- Location within Switzerland Location within Canton of Zurich
- Coordinates: 47°41′N 8°38′E
- Country: Switzerland
- Canton: Zurich
- District: Andelfingen

Area
  - Total: 2.40 km^{2} (0.93 sq mi)
- Elevation: 413 m (1,355 ft)

Population (December 2020)
  - Total: 1,552
  - Density: 647/km^{2} (1,670/sq mi)
- Time zone: UTC+01:00 (CET)
  - Summer (DST): UTC+02:00 (CEST)
- Postal code: 8247
- SFOS number: 29
- ISO 3166 code: CH-ZH
- Surrounded by: Feuerthalen, Laufen-Uhwiesen, Neuhausen am Rheinfall (SH), Schaffhausen (SH)
- Website: www.flurlingen.ch

Flurlingen is a municipality in the district of Andelfingen in the canton of Zürich in Switzerland.

== History ==
Flurlingen is first mentioned in 876 as Flurlingin.

== Geography ==
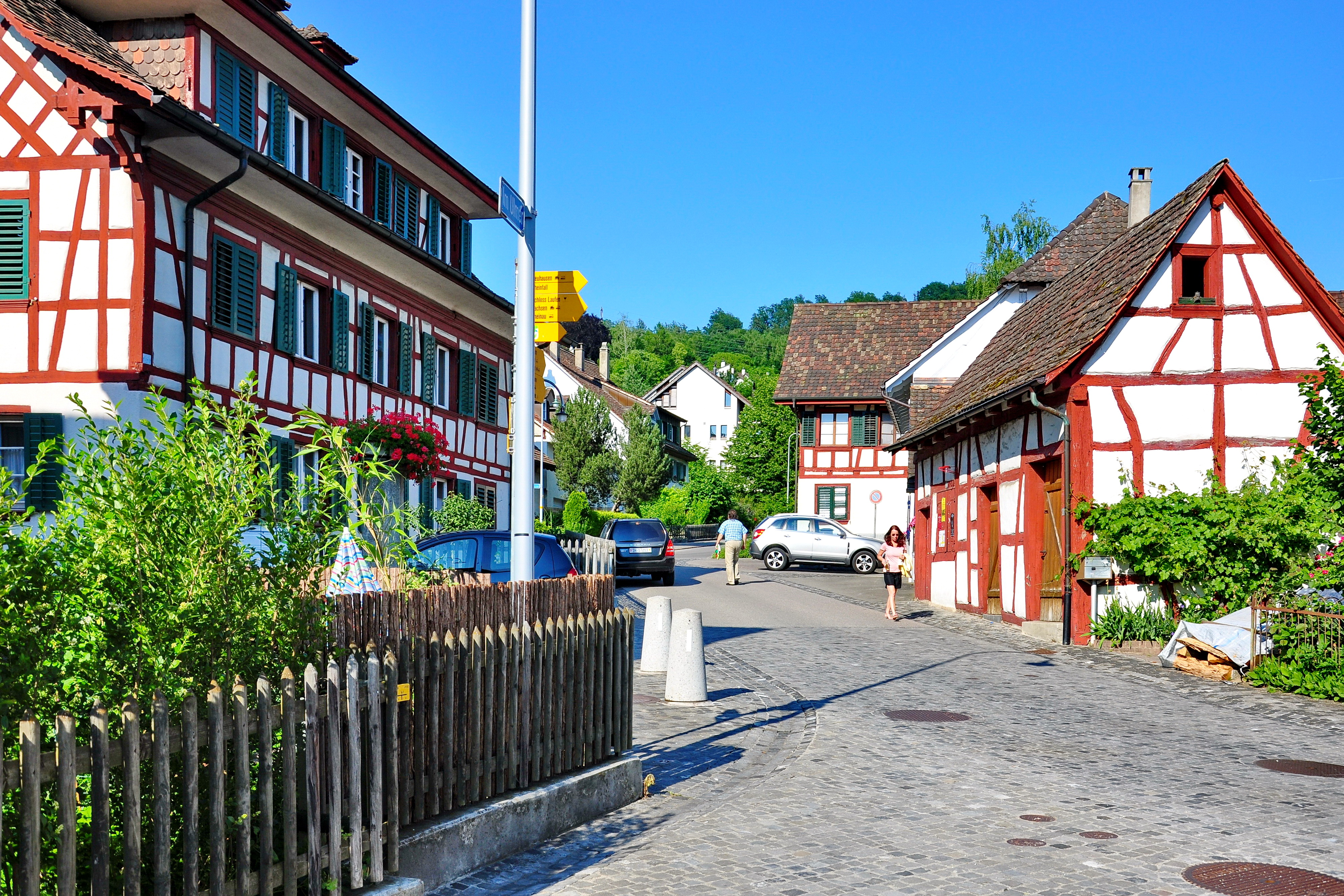
City centre

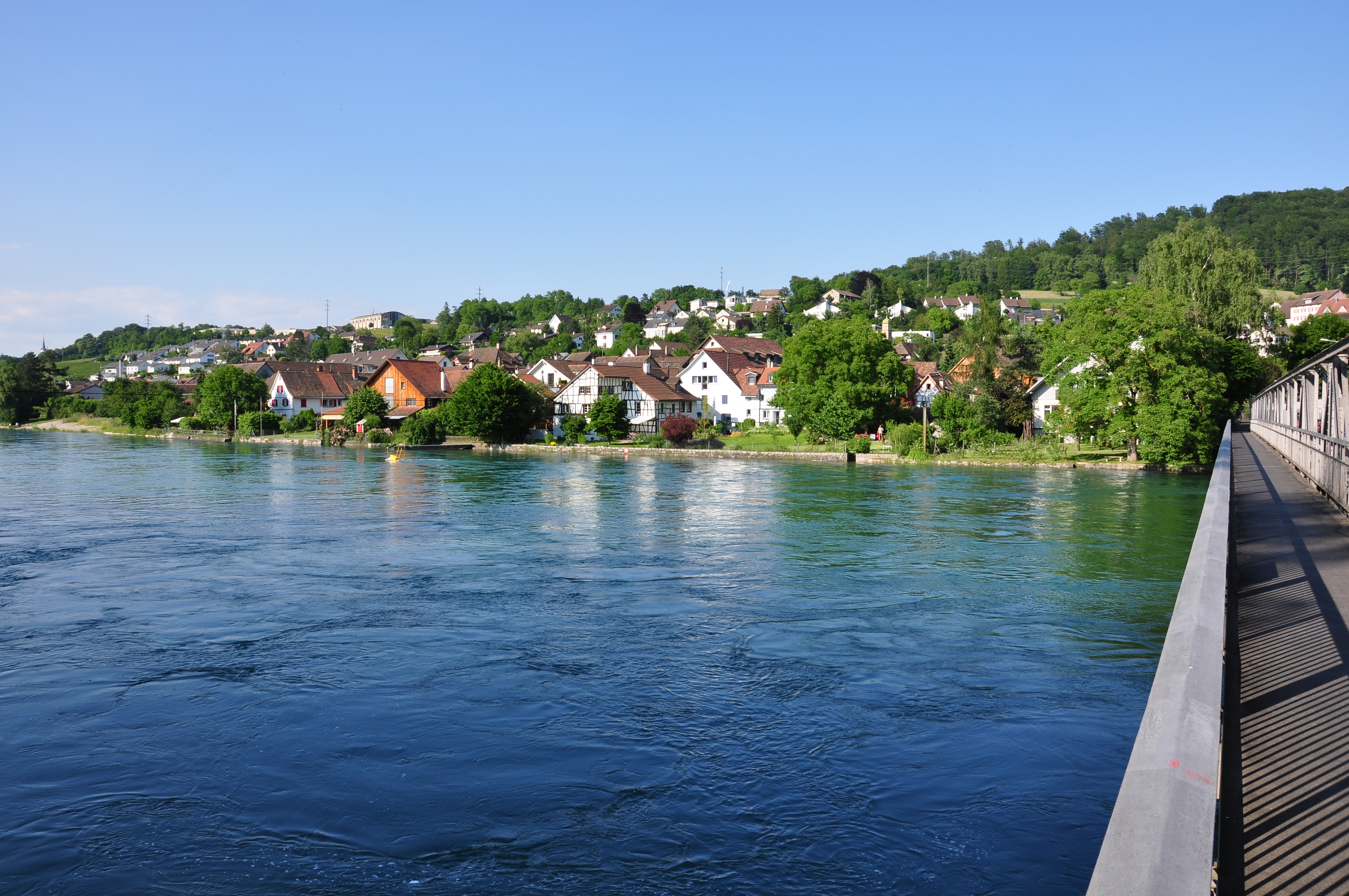
Rhine river near Flurlingen

Aerial view (1950)

Flurlingen has an area of 2.4 km^{2} (0.93 sq mi). Of this area, 18.3% is used for agricultural purposes, while 55.6% is forested. Of the rest of the land, 22% is settled (buildings or roads) and the remainder (4.1%) is non-productive (rivers, glaciers or mountains).

The municipality if located on the Rhine river to the west of the Cholfirst elevation.

== Sights ==
The 96 m tall Cholfirst Radio Tower is built on Cholfirst at an elevation of 570 m (1,870 ft).

== Demographics ==
Flurlingen has a population (as of 31 December 2020) of 1,552. As of 2007, 10.3% of the population was made up of foreign nationals. Over the last 10 years the population has grown at a rate of 12.3%. Most of the population (as of 2000) speaks German (94.3%), with Serbo-Croatian being second most common ( 1.1%) and Albanian being third ( 1.0%).

In the 2007 election the most popular party was the SVP which received 29.2% of the vote. The next three most popular parties were the SPS (19.9%), the FDP (18.8%) and the Green Party (13.2%).

The age distribution of the population (as of 2000) is children and teenagers (0–19 years old) make up 24.4% of the population, while adults (20–64 years old) make up 61.5% and seniors (over 64 years old) make up 14%. The entire Swiss population is generally well educated. In Flurlingen about 85.7% of the population (between age 25–64) have completed either non-mandatory upper secondary education or additional higher education (either university or a Fachhochschule).

Flurlingen has an unemployment rate of 1.16%. As of 2005, there were 47 people employed in the primary economic sector and about 5 businesses involved in this sector. 140 people are employed in the secondary sector and there are 26 businesses in this sector. 165 people are employed in the tertiary sector, with 46 businesses in this sector.

The historical population is given in the following table:

| year | population |
|---|---|
| 1467 | 31 Households |
| 1637 | 170 |
| 1708 | 329 |
| 1850 | 400 |
| 1900 | 902 |
| 1910 | 1,023 |
| 1930 | 895 |
| 1950 | 951 |
| 1960 | 1,049 |
| 1970 | 935 |
| 2000 | 1,248 |

== Economic trends ==
Although traditionally a wine-growing municipality, in recent years, the number of wealthy individuals moving to the area have increased due to the relocation of several multi-national headquarters to the nearby municipalities of Schaffhausen and Neuhausen.

This has resulted in an increased demand for housing in this low-tax municipality which is now regarded as one of the most exclusive and sought-after locations.
