= Anacaona 27 Tower =

Skyscraper in Santo Domingo

Anacaona 27

General information
- Status: Completed
- Type: Residential
- Location: Santo Domingo, Dominican Republic, C2QH+6PC, 27 Avenida Anacaona, Los Cacicazgos, Santo Domingo
- Coordinates: 18.43810°N 69.97073°W
- Construction started: 2012
- Completed: 2017

Height
- Roof: 161 m (528 ft)

Technical details
- Structural system: Concrete
- Floor count: 41 (+2 underground)
- Floor area: 51,100 m^{2} (550,000 sq ft)

Design and construction
- Architects: Selman & Asociados
- Structural engineer: Rodríguez Sandoval & Asociados

The Anacaona 27 Tower (also known as Torre Anacaona 27) is a residential skyscraper in Santo Domingo, Dominican Republic. Built between 2012 and 2017, the tower stands at 161 m (528 ft) tall with 41 floors, it is currently the second tallest building in the Dominican Republic and the Caribbean.

== History ==
The building was designed by Isay Weinfeld and technically supervised by Rodríguez Sandoval & Asociados firm. Its concept aimed to create an aerodynamic design to face prevailing winds. The first five floors host mixed-use spaces and parking lots.

The building's glazing features a system of XD Favemanc ventilated panels. The building features more than 17,000 square meters of ceramic ventilated facade and more than 1,800 linear meters of ceramic sunscreen. The selected ventilated facade system features ceramic plates sized at 1200 x 300 mm and measuring 24 mm in thickness. Currently, it is being operated with oversight from the technical team Favemanc.

The building received its LEED Gold Certificate in 2018.

== See also ==
- List of tallest buildings by country

Records
| Preceded by Torre Caney | Tallest building in the Dominican Republic; 2017–present | Succeeded by Incumbent |
