= Iriški Venac Tower =

- Кула Иришки венац Kula Iriški venac
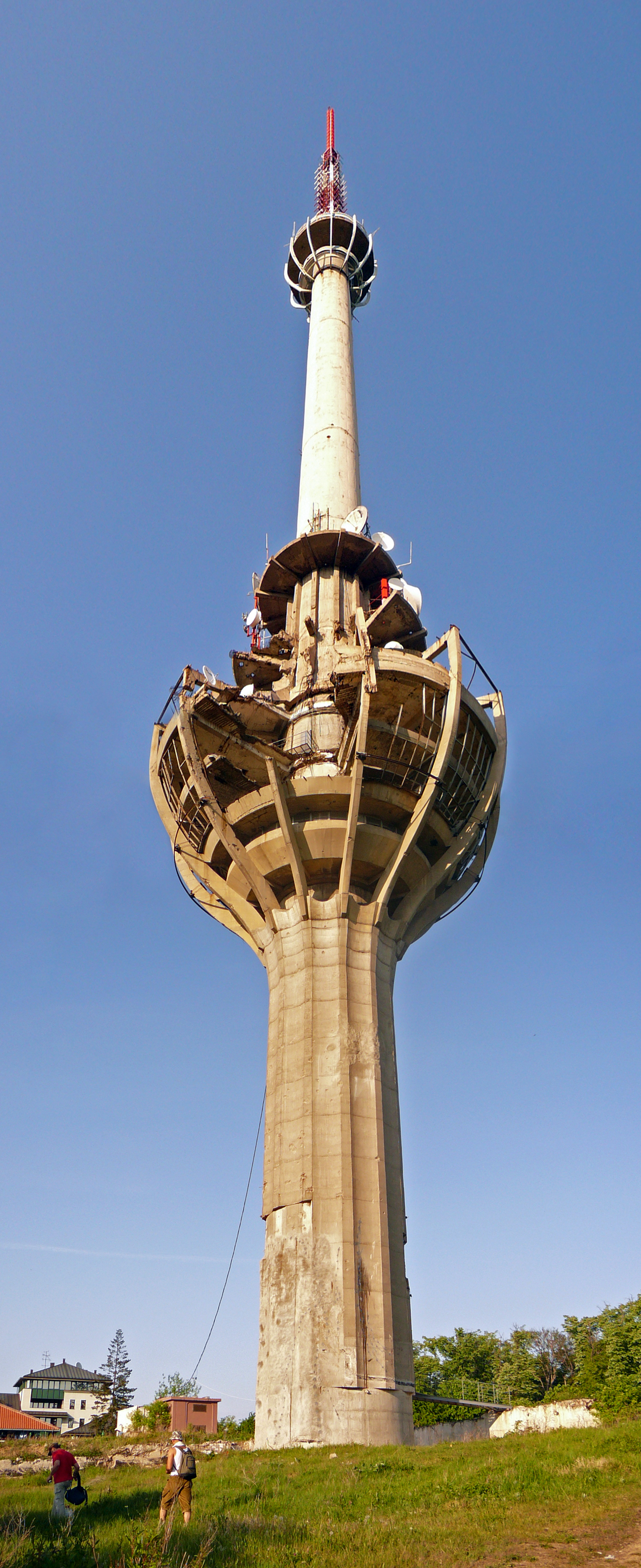
- The Iriški Venac Tower with partial damage.

General information
- Status: Defunct / Partially damaged
- Location: Iriški Venac, Fruška Gora, Novi Sad, Serbia
- Coordinates: 45.158414°N 19.861840°E
- Completed: 1975
- Closed: 1999 (destroyed)

Design and construction
- Architect: Gliša Stajić

The Iriški Venac Tower (Serbian: Кула Иришки венац, romanized: Kula Iriški venac, lit. "Irish Wreath Tower"; pronounced [ǐriʃkiː ʋɛ̌ːnats]) is a 175-metre-tall TV tower built of concrete on Iriški Venac in Fruška Gora near Novi Sad, Serbia. It consists of a 120-metre-tall concrete structure with two baskets on which the 30-metre-long section with FM-antennas has been placed. On the pinnacle there is a 20-metre-long TV antenna.

== History ==
The tower was built in 1975 and its lower basket was partly destroyed during the NATO bombing of Yugoslavia. Sources estimate that the tower was hit by over 50 missiles. The damage was estimated to be at 11.5 million dollars.
