= Radio Gaúcha AM Guaíba Mast =

Structure in Brazil

The Radio Gaúcha AM Guaíba Mast (also known as IPÊ Mast or as Antena do Parque Técnico Maurício Sirotsky Sobrinho) was the tallest man-made object in Brazil. The It is used by Radio Gaúcha for medium-wave AM radio broadcasting, on frequency 600 kHz with 100 kW of power. The mast is located in the city of Guaíba, in the metropolitan area of Porto Alegre, state of Rio Grande do Sul, at 30°05′34.01″S 51°18′31.78″W. It is a 230-metre (755 ft.) tall, ground-insulated guyed mast radiator. The Radio Gaúcha AM Guaíba Mast was built in 1985/1986 to improve the transmissions of football matches. It is an almost exact replica of the Warsaw Radio Mast, although it is not nearly as high.
