= The Pakubuwono =

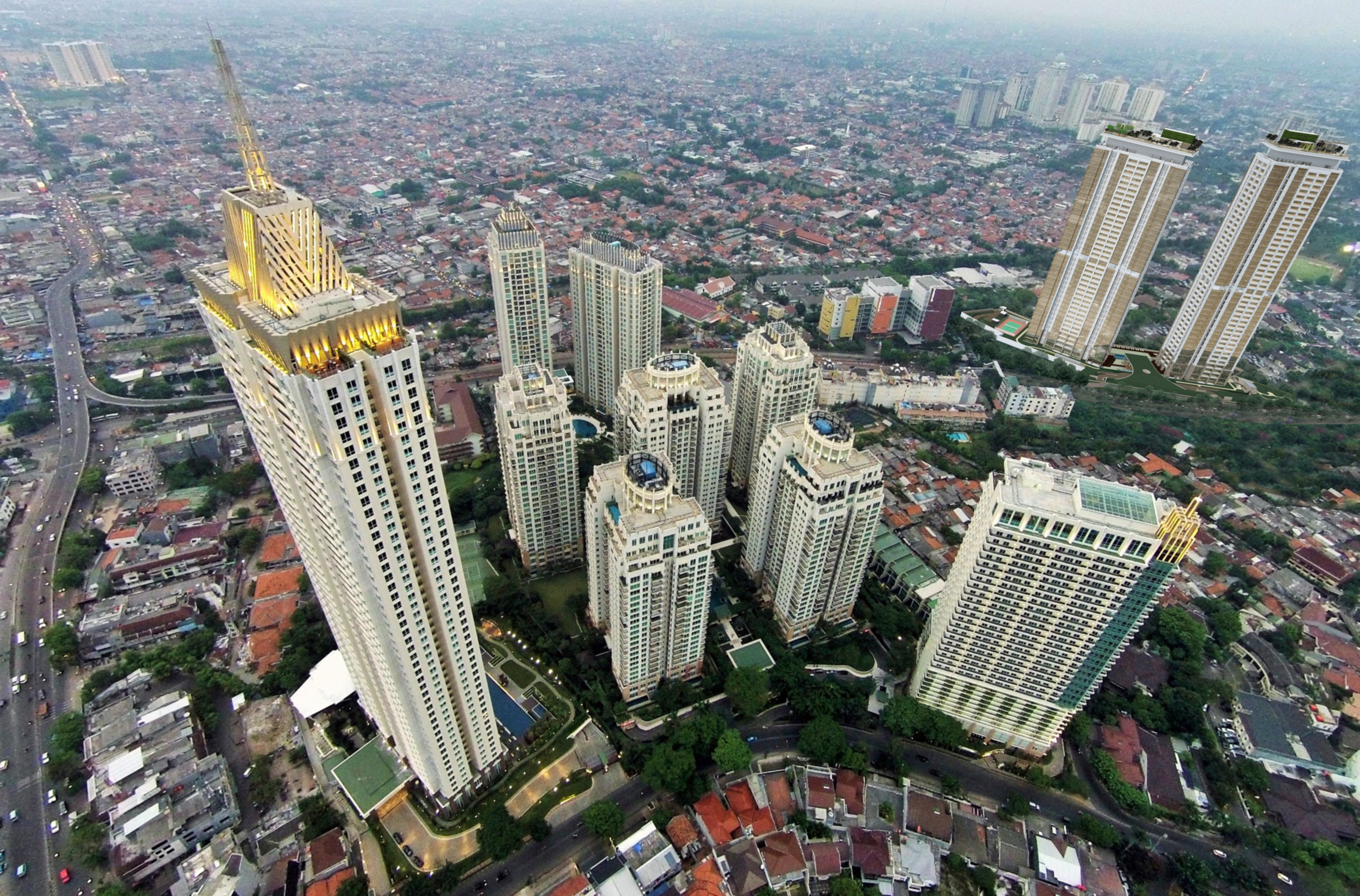
- Seen here (left-to-right): The Pakubuwono Signature, The Pakubuwono Residence, The Pakubuwono View, The Pakubuwono House, and an artist rendering of The Pakubuwono Spring.

General information
- Type: Residential
- Location: Jakarta, Indonesia
- Construction started: 2003 (First project - The Pakubuwono Residence)

Height
- Tip: 252 m (The Pakubuwono Signature)

The Pakubuwono is a residential complex consisting of 11 skyscrapers at Kebayoran Baru in South Jakarta, and 1 Makorewood Tower at Menteng in Central Jakarta. Indonesia.

The Pakubuwono Signature is an ultra-luxury development designed by Airmas Asri Architects in collaboration with Langdon & Seah. It is currently the tallest residential building in Indonesia, standing at 252 meters tall with 52 floors above ground.

Skyscrapers of The Pakubuwono Development complex are as follows:

| No. | Name | Year | Notes |
|---|---|---|---|
| 1 | The Pakubuwono Residence | 2006 | 5 Towers: Eaglewood, Cottonwood, Sandalwood, Ironwood, and Basswood. 639 Units Total. |
| 2 | The Pakubuwono View | 2010 | 2 Towers: Redwood and Lacewood. 384 Units Total. |
| 3 | The Pakubuwono House | 2014 | 1 Tower: Rosewood 198 Units Total and 9 Townhouse. |
| 4 | The Pakubuwono Signature | 2014 | 1 Tower: Satinwood. 188 Units Total. Tallest Residential Building in Indonesia. |
| 5 | The Pakubuwono Spring | 2018 | 2 Towers: Applewood and Cherrywood. 543 Units Total. |
| 6 | The Pakubuwono Menteng | 2021 | 1 Towers: Makorewood. 187 Units Total. |

== See also ==
- List of tallest buildings in Jakarta
- List of tallest buildings in Indonesia
