= Cholfirst Radio Tower =

Radio tower in Zurich, Switzerland

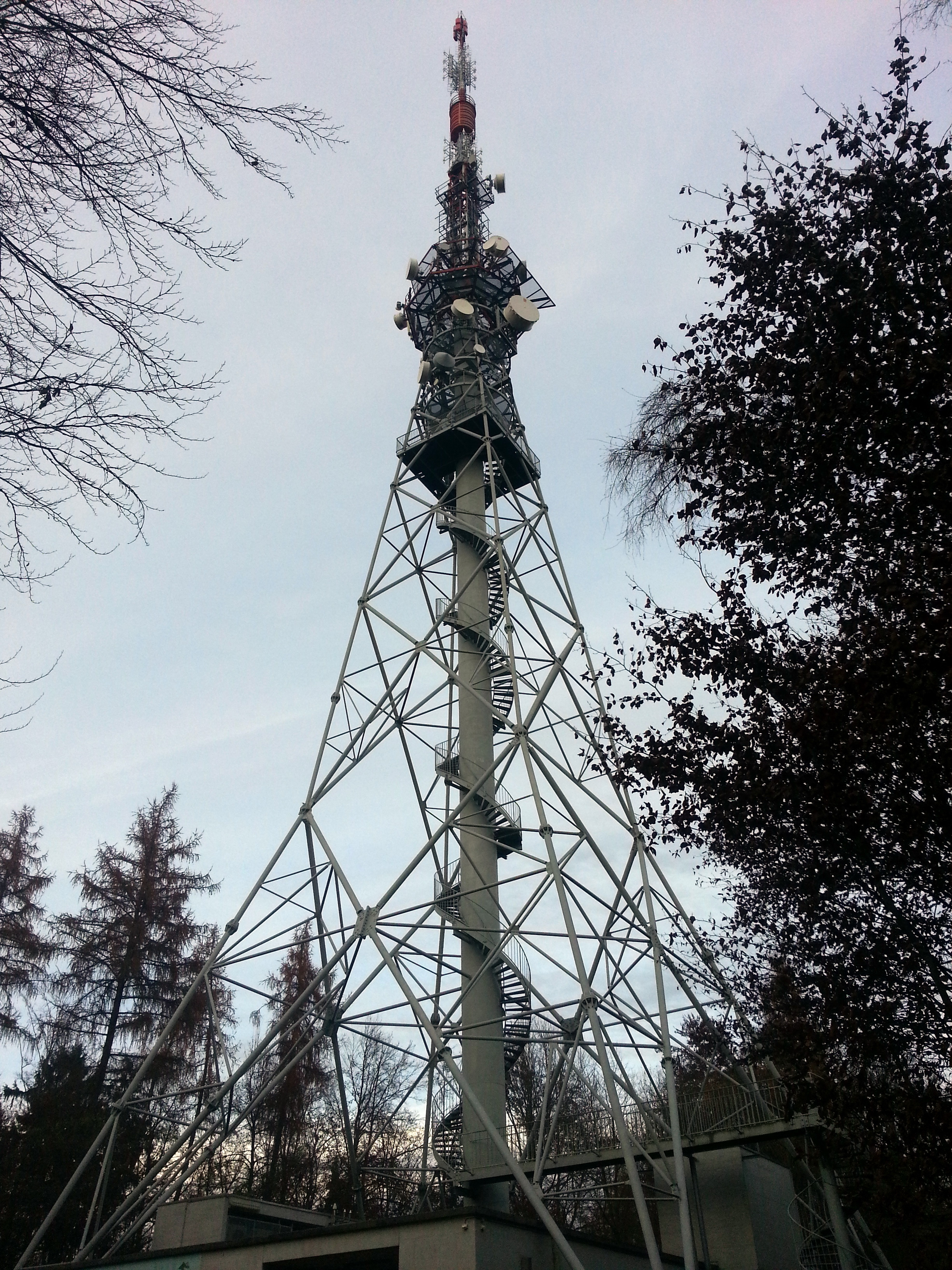
Cholfirst sendeturm

Cholfirst Radio Tower is a 96-metre-tall (315 ft) lattice tower on Cholfirst Mountain at Flurlingen, Canton of Zurich, Switzerland.

The tower was built in 1973 by PTT on Cholfirst Mountain, a 570-metre (1,870 ft) mountain near Flurlingen (47°40′51″N 8°38′48″E) after 3 years of successful operation of an experimental TV transmitter on channel 47 on a 40-metre-tall (130 ft) tower nearby. The construction of Cholfirst Radio Tower cost 7 million Swiss Francs. On request of Flurlingen community it was equipped with an observation deck, accessible for tourists by stairway (no elevator) in a height of 42 metres, of which additional costs were paid by PTT.

== Transmitted programmes ==
Programme	Frequency	ERP	Remarks
DRS 1	90.3 MHz	0.45 kW	
DRS 2	100.6 MHz	0.45 kW	
DRS 3	105.7 MHz	0.45 kW	
Radio Top	102.3 MHz	0.2 kW	
Radio Munot	51.5 MHz	0.5 kW	
