= Galați TV Tower =

Coordinates: 45°24′47″N 28°01′27″E

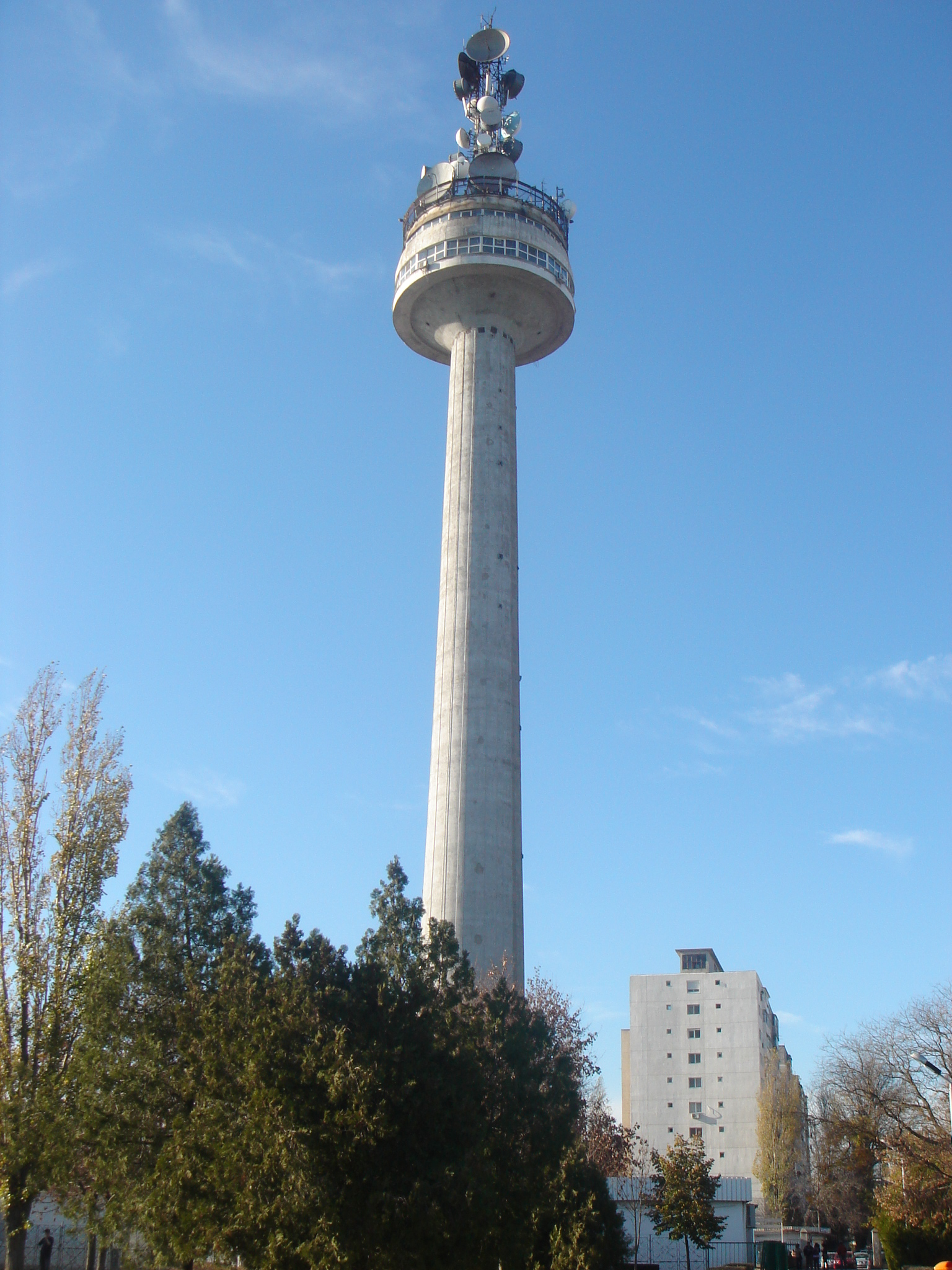
TV Tower Galati

Galați TV Tower (Romanian: Turnul de televiziune Galaţi) is a 110-metre (360 ft) tall concrete tower used for FM and TV broadcasting in Galați, Romania. The tower, completed in 1978, is equipped with a tower restaurant, perhaps the only of this kind in Romania.
