= Maha Tower =

- Menara MAHA
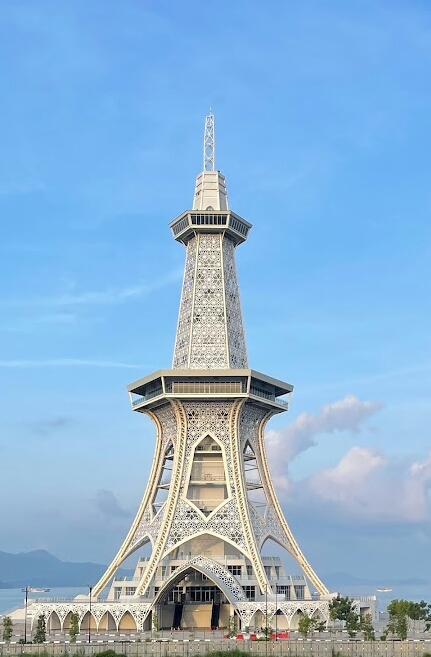
- The MAHA Tower.
- Former names: Langkawi City Tower

Record height
- Tallest in Langkawi since December 2021^{[I]}
- Preceded by: Langkawi Istana Condominium

General information
- Status: Completed
- Type: Observation, restaurant
- Architectural style: Islamic version of Eiffel Tower
- Location: Maha Tower, Persiaran Mahawangsa, Mukim Kuah, 07000 Langkawi, Kedah Darul Aman, Malaysia
- Coordinates: 6°19′14″N 99°50′46″E
- Groundbreaking: 2014
- Construction started: January 2015
- Topped-out: February 2021
- Completed: December 2021
- Opening: December 2021
- Owner: Langkawi City

Height
- Antenna spire: 138 m (453 ft) (Equivalent to a 29-story building)
- Roof: 122 m (400 ft)
- Top floor: 102 m (335 ft)
- Observatory: 102 m (335 ft)

Technical details
- Structural system: Steel; Reinforced concrete
- Floor count: 5

Design and construction
- Architect: Neoformation Architects Sdn. Bhd.
- Developer: PFCE Integrated Plant and Project Sdn. Bhd.
- Known for: Landmark of Langkawi after Dataran Lang

Website
- www.mahatower.com.my

Maha Tower, formerly known as Langkawi City Tower is a 2-story, 138-meter-tall tower in Kuah, Kedah, Malaysia. It is Malaysia's second tallest tower. It is the latest addition, also part of the Langkawi City's project. The tower is approximately 1.40 km from Dataran Lang.
