= Torre Caney =

General information
- Type: Residential
- Location: Santo Domingo, Dominican Republic
- Coordinates: 18°26′54.56″N 69°56′44.04″W
- Construction started: 2005
- Completed: 2008

Height
- Roof: 178 meters

Technical details
- Floor count: 42

Design and construction
- Architect: Ing. Jesús Rodríguez Sandoval
- Developer: Rodríguez Sandoval & Asociados

Torre Caney is the tallest building in Santo Domingo and the Dominican Republic. At 178 m (584 ft) tall, it is one of the tallest buildings in the Caribbean region. It's the tallest building in the Dominican Republic. It is located along the Anacaona Avenue, an area of increasing development in Santo Domingo which hosts many of the tallest buildings in the country and the Caribbean.

== Construction ==
Construction started in 2005 and was completed in 2008 by the Rodriguez Sandoval firm, which has completed numerous projects including other Dominican skyscrapers such as Aquabella, Torre Carib, Torre Pedro Enrique Ureña, and the famous Malecon Center.

== Interior ==
The building includes a three-story lobby, indoor parking and a gymnasium. The roof accommodates a heliport and a swimming pool. Each single floor apartment has 853 m^{2} (9,182 sq ft) of space, of which there are 31.
