= Villagio Vista =

High-rise residential building in Ghana

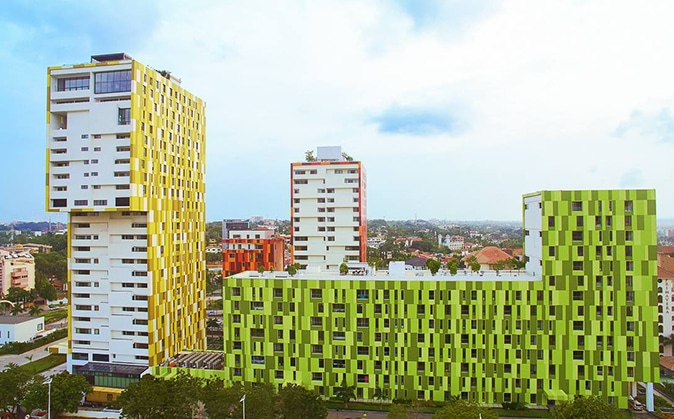

General information
- Status: Completed
- Location: Accra, Ghana
- Cost: $86 million

Design and construction
- Architect: Allford Hall Monaghan Morris
- Architecture firm: DIRT Studios
- Developer: Trassacco Estates Development Company
- Structural engineer: AKT II
- Main contractor: Trasacco Estates Development Company
- Awards and prizes: Accra's Tallest Building in 2012.

Other information
- Number of rooms: 146
- Number of restaurants: 2
- Number of bars: 2
- Facilities: Swimming Pool

Villagio Vista is a high-rise residential apartment complex located in Accra. It was built by Trassaco Estate Development Company and was completed in 2016.

The complex consists of three towers. The Alto tower was the tallest building in Ghana at 27 floors. (Note: See footnote 4 of Urban Studies' article.) The 100 meters Tower at The Bank Square, commissioned in November 2024, emerged as the tallest building in Ghana.

== Background ==
Villagio Vista is a three building apartment complex built with a boldly patterned facade, with inspiration from Kente, a traditional Ghanaian clothing garment. It consists of 3 buildings, Villagio Alto (yellow patterned), Villagio Azure (red patterned) and Villagio Aqua (green patterned).
