= Malecon Center =

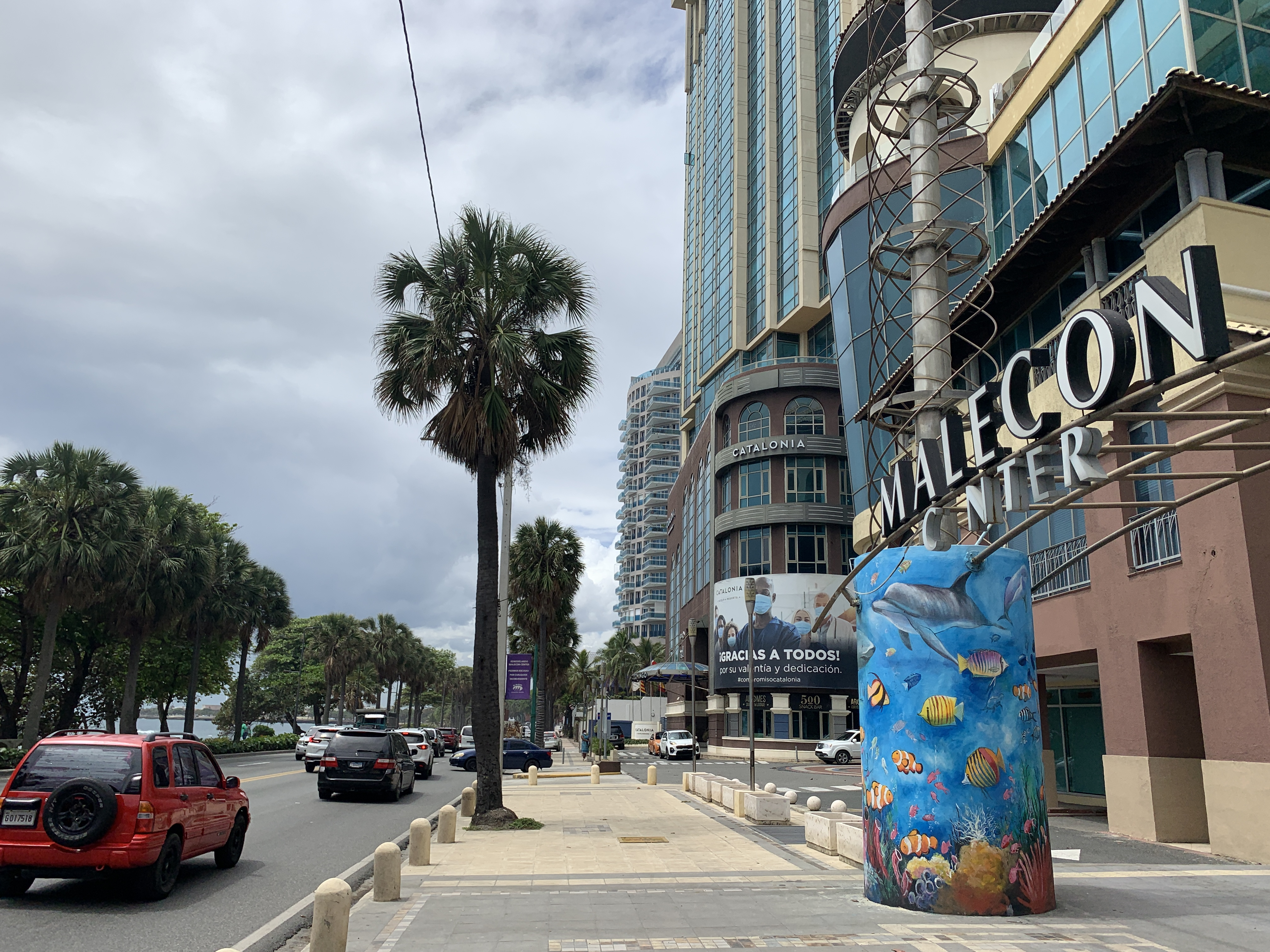
- Interactive map of the Malecon Center area

General information
- Type: Residential, hotel, commercial
- Location: Santo Domingo, Dominican Republic
- Coordinates: 18°27′32.42″N 69°54′37.69″W
- Completed: 2003 (towers); 2004 (hotel)

Height
- Roof: 122.4 m (401.6 ft) (each tower); 96 m (315.0 ft) (hotel)

Technical details
- Floor count: 31 (each tower); 21 (hotel)
- Floor area: 195,000 m^{2} (2,098,963 sq ft)

Design and construction
- Architect: Jesús Rodríguez Sandoval
- Developer: Rodríguez Sandoval
- Main contractor: Rodríguez Sandoval

The Malecon Center is a complex of skyscrapers in Santo Domingo, Dominican Republic. The complex was built in 2003. The complex is divided into four towers: Malecon 1, Malecon 2, Malecon 3 and Hilton Santo Domingo. The three Malecon towers each with a height of 122.4 m (402 ft) are the second tallest buildings in the Dominican Republic. Each Malecon tower has 31 floors and the Hilton Santo Domingo has 21 floors, for a total of 114 floors in the complex. The buildings were designed by the architecture firm Rodríguez Sandoval.

The three Malecon towers, which were completed in 2003, are for residential use. The fourth tower in the complex, Hilton Santo Domingo, is a hotel that was completed in 2004. Also included in the complex are a mall, movie theater and a casino. The complex is located near the shore and overlooks the Caribbean Sea.
