= Kalodzishchy TV Mast =

Television tower in Belarus

Coordinates: 53°57′19″N 27°47′23″E

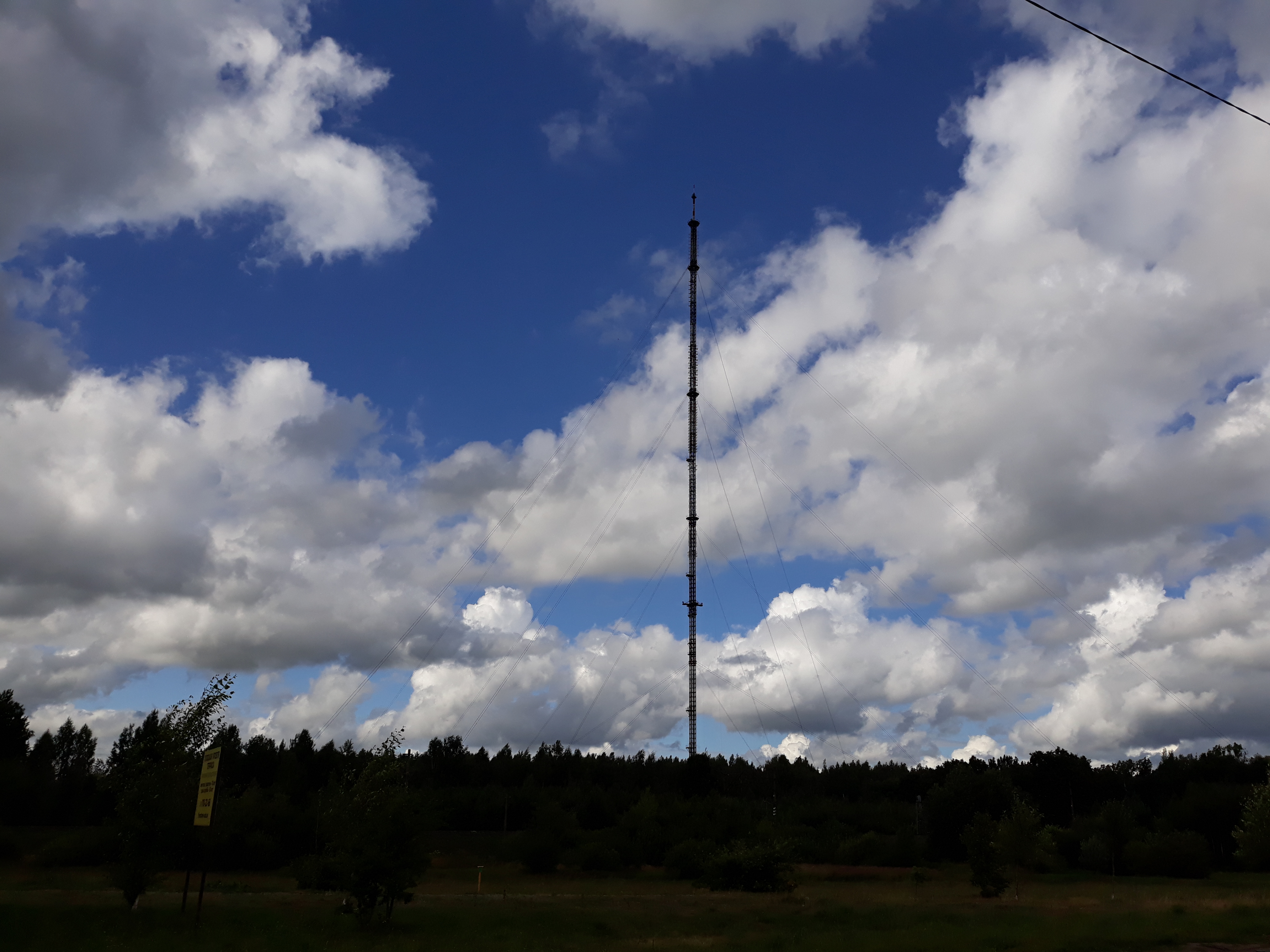
Kalodzishchy TV mast

The Kalodzishchy TV Mast (Russian: РТПС Колодищи) is a 350-metre tall guyed TV mast situated at Kalodzishchy, east of Minsk in Belarus. It is among the tallest towers in Belarus.

The mast was built in 1970, replacing an existing medium wave broadcasting station that had been built before World War II. In recent years, the number of transmitters using the Kalodzishchy TV Mast has grown.

As a replacement and/or supplement, plans for a 425-metre TV tower at Minsk were developed. These plans were canceled for financial reasons.
