= List of tallest buildings in Algeria =

This list of tallest buildings in the Algeria ranks skyscrapers in the Algeria based on official height.

This list ranks completed and topped out skyscrapers in Algeria that stand at least 100 metres (328 ft) tall, based on standard height measurement. This includes spires and architectural details but does not include antenna masts or minarets. An equal sign (=) following a rank indicates the same height between two or more buildings. The "Year" column indicates the year in which a building was completed.

== Tallest buildings ==
Was the tallest building in Algeria upon completion
Indicates was the tallest buildings that have been architecturally topped out but completed

Rank	Name	Image	Location	Height m (ft)	Floors	Year	Notes	References
1	Great Mosque of Algeria		Algiers	265 metres (869 ft)	37	2019	The tallest mosque in the world since 2019; The tallest building in Africa from 2019-2024; The tallest building in Algeria since 2019	
2	Dely Brahim Tower	—	Algiers	130 metres (426 ft)	34	2026	Has not completely finished construction, interior still to be made	
3	Ministry of Housing, Urban Planning and the City		Algiers	123 metres (404 ft)	24	2025		
4	Galaxy Oran Tower	—	Oran	118 metres (387 ft)	30	2022	Has not completely finished construction, interior still to be made	
5	Benabed Résidence Tower Oran		Oran	113 metres (371 ft)	29	2018	The tallest building in Algeria from 2018-2019	
6=	Bahia Center Tower A		Oran	111 metres (364 ft)	31	2009	The tallest buildings in Algeria from 2009-2018	
6=	Bahia Center Tower D		Oran	111 metres (364 ft)	31	2011	The tallest buildings in Algeria from 2009-2018	
6=	Bahia Center Tower C		Oran	111 metres (364 ft)	31	2012	The tallest buildings in Algeria from 2009-2018	
6=	Bahia Center Tower B		Oran	111 metres (364 ft)	31	2014	The tallest buildings in Algeria from 2009-2018	
10=	Sidi Abdallah Tower	—	Algiers	110 metres (360 ft)	30	2022	Has not completely finished construction, interior still to be made	
10=	Gulf Bank Algeria Headquarters		Algiers	110 metres (360 ft)	25	2022		
12	Emir Abdelkader Mosque		Constantine	107 metres (351 ft)	0 (Minarets)	1994	The tallest building in Algeria from 1994-2009	
13	Odéon Tower		Oran	106 metres (348 ft)	28	2019		
14=	Cherif Athman Towers II	—	Algiers	105 metres (344 ft)	28	2019		
14=	Holiday Inn Algiers - Cheraga Tower	—	Algiers	105 metres (344 ft)	25	2018		
16	Abdelhamid Ben Badis Mosque		Oran	104 metres (341 ft)	21	2015		
17=	Emiral Forum Al-Djazair Towers A	—	Algiers	100 metres (330 ft)	23	2023		
17=	Emiral Forum Al-Djazair Towers B	—	Algiers	100 metres (330 ft)	23	2023		
17=	Emiral Forum Al-Djazair Towers C	—	Algiers	100 metres (330 ft)	23	2023		
17=	Emiral Forum Al-Djazair Towers D	—	Algiers	100 metres (330 ft)	23	2023		

=== Under construction/Planned ===
This list’s buildings that are currently under construction of planned in Algeria and are expected to rise to a height of at least 100 metres (328 ft). Future buildings that have already been topped out are also included

Name	Image	City	Height m (ft)	Floors	Year	Notes
Dzair Media City Main Tower		Media City,Algiers	310 metres (1,017 ft)	70-75	2027	Will be the tallest building in Algeria upon completion and first supertall skyscraper
Al Djazair Tower 1		Oran	300 metres (984 ft)	62	Unknown (On Hold)	
ENTV Tower		Media City,Algiers	280 metres (919 ft)	55-60	2027	
Al Djazair Tower 2		Oran	250 metres (820 ft)	50-52	Unknown (On Hold)	
EPRS Tower		Media City,Algiers	200-250 metres (656-820 ft)	45-55	2028	
APS Tower		Media City,Algiers	200-250 metres (656-820 ft)	45-55	2028	
ANEP Tower		Media City,Algiers	200-250 metres (656-820 ft)	45-55	2028	
Algiers Millenium Waterfront Tower		Algiers	180-210 metres (591-689 ft)	50	2030	
The Marina Tower		Oran	120 metres (394 ft)	30	2027-2028	
Les Galets Tower 3		Oran	110 metres (360 ft)	30	2022 (On Hold)	
Les Galets Tower 2		Oran	105 metres (344 ft)	28	2022 (On Hold)	
Saïd Hamdine Twin Tower A		Algiers	~105 metres (344 ft)	30	2028	
Saïd Hamdine Twin Tower B		Algiers	~105 metres (344 ft)	30	2028	
Hussein Dey Twin Tower A		Algiers	105 metres (344 ft)	30	2028	
Hussein Dey Twin Tower B		Algiers	105 metres (344 ft)	30	2028	

== See also ==
- List of tallest buildings in Africa
- List of tallest buildings in the world
- List of tallest structures in Algeria
