= Sidi Brahim al-Masmudi Mosque =

Mosque in Tlemcen, Algeria

- مسجد سيدي ابراهيم المصمودي
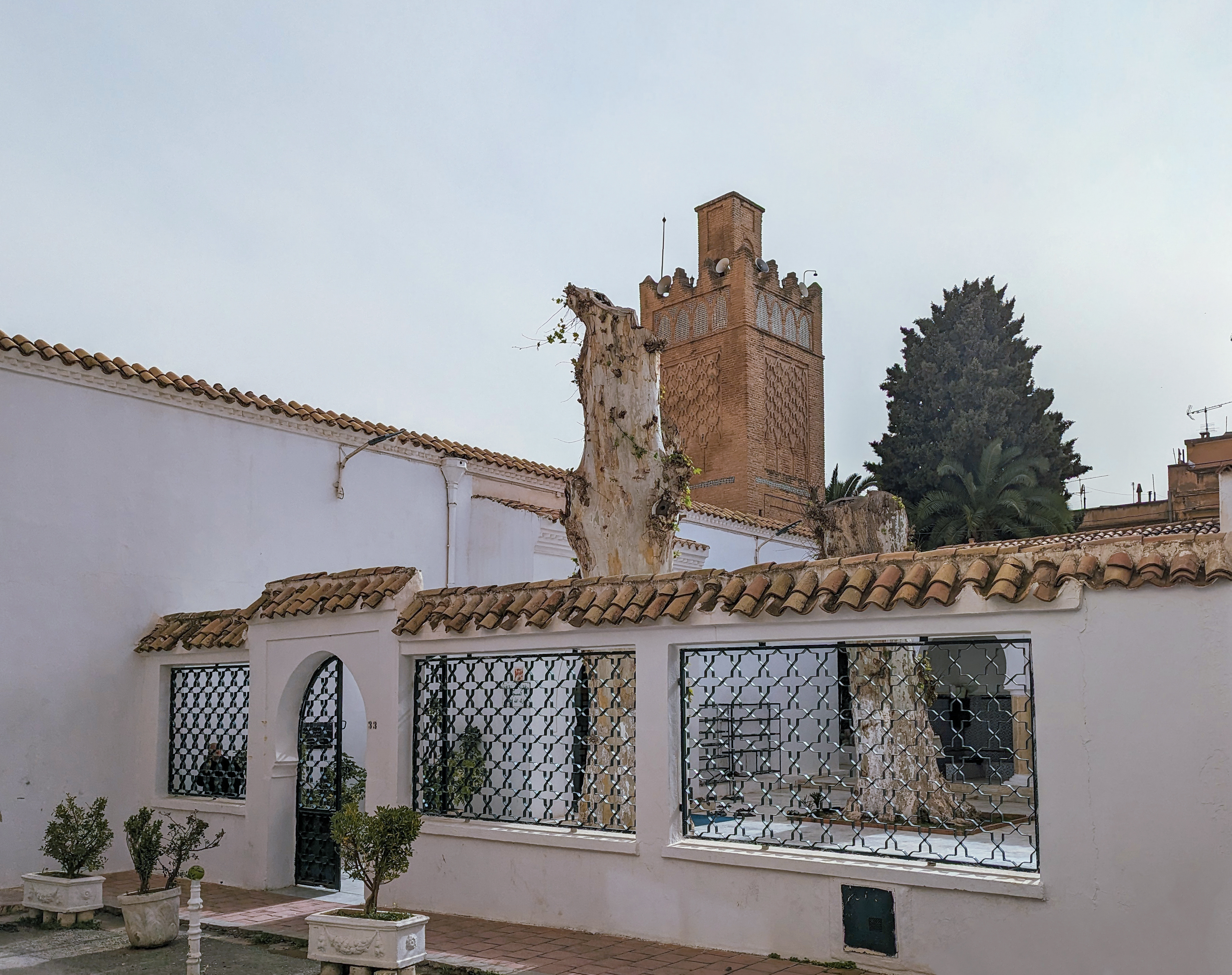
- The mosque in 2024

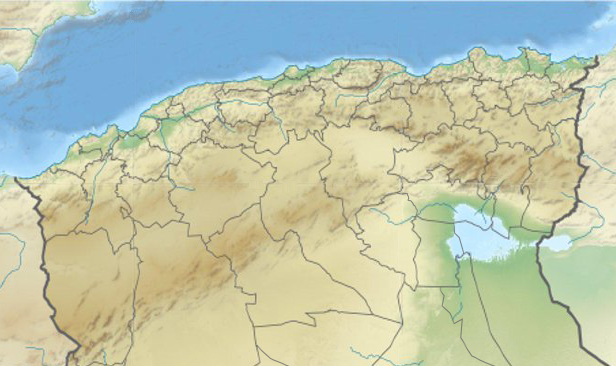
- Location of the mosque in northern Algeria

Religion
- Affiliation: Islam
- Ecclesiastical or organizational status: Mosque
- Status: Active

Location
- Location: Tlemcen
- Country: Algeria
- Interactive map of Sidi Brahim al-Masmudi Mosque
- Coordinates: 34°52′53.8″N 1°18′41.7″W

Architecture
- Type: Islamic architecture
- Founder: Sultan Abu Hammu II
- Completed: 765 AH (1363/1364 CE)
- Minaret: 1

The Sidi Brahim al-Masmudi Mosque (Arabic: مسجد سيدي ابراهيم المصمودي) is a mosque located in central Tlemcen, Algeria. Completed in 765 AH (1363/1364 CE) by the sultan Abu Hammu II, ruler of the Zayyanid dynasty, the mosque was built alongside Sheik Sidi Brahim's tomb, which gave the mosque its name.

== History ==
The mosque is part of the Ya'qubiya complex. It was likely built to commemorate Sultan Abu Hammu II's father and two of his uncles, who were praised as heroes of the war against the Marinids. The Ya'qubiya complex underwent renovations in 2011 that greatly impacted and changed the design of the complex and the mosque.

== Gallery ==
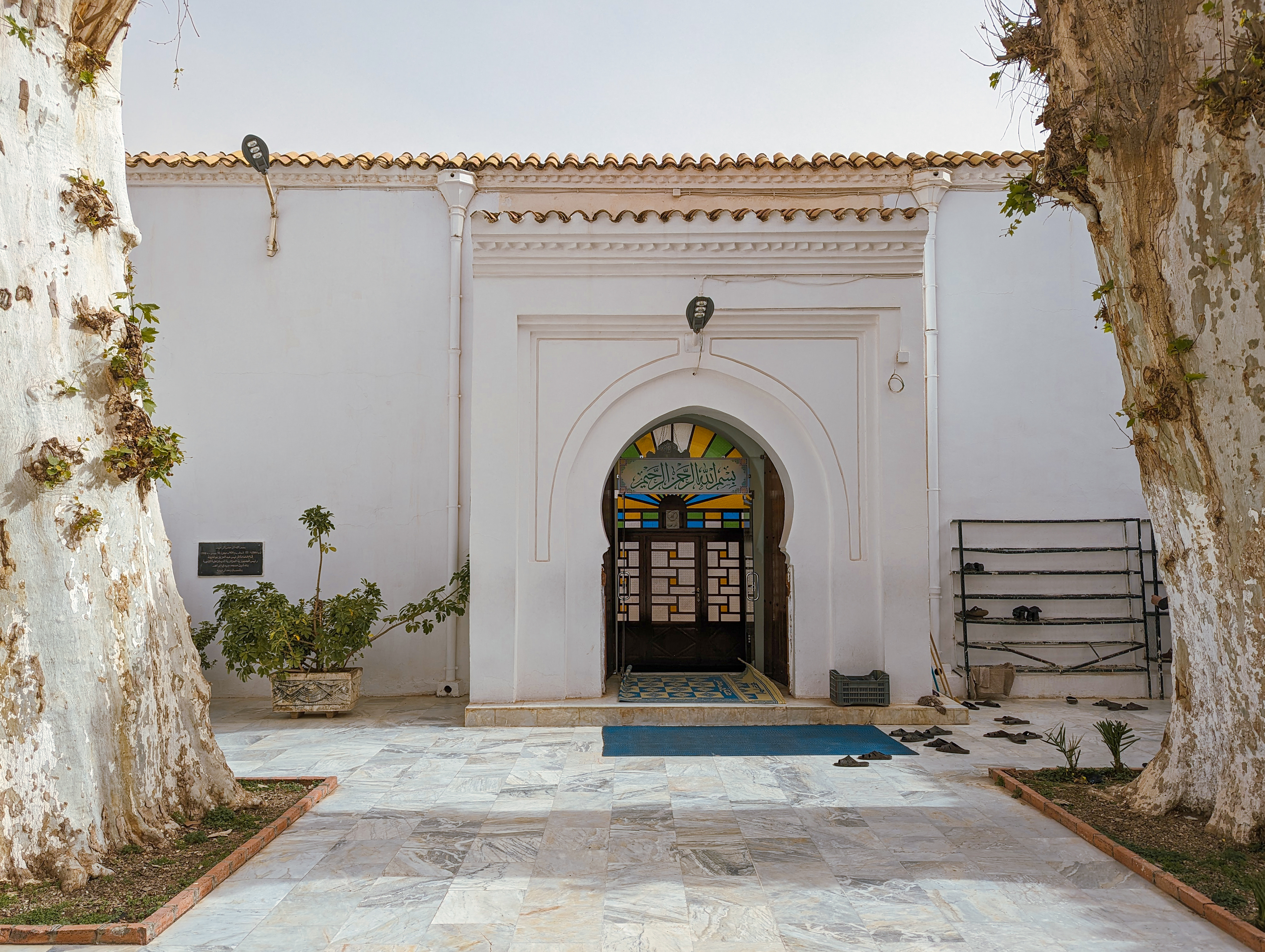

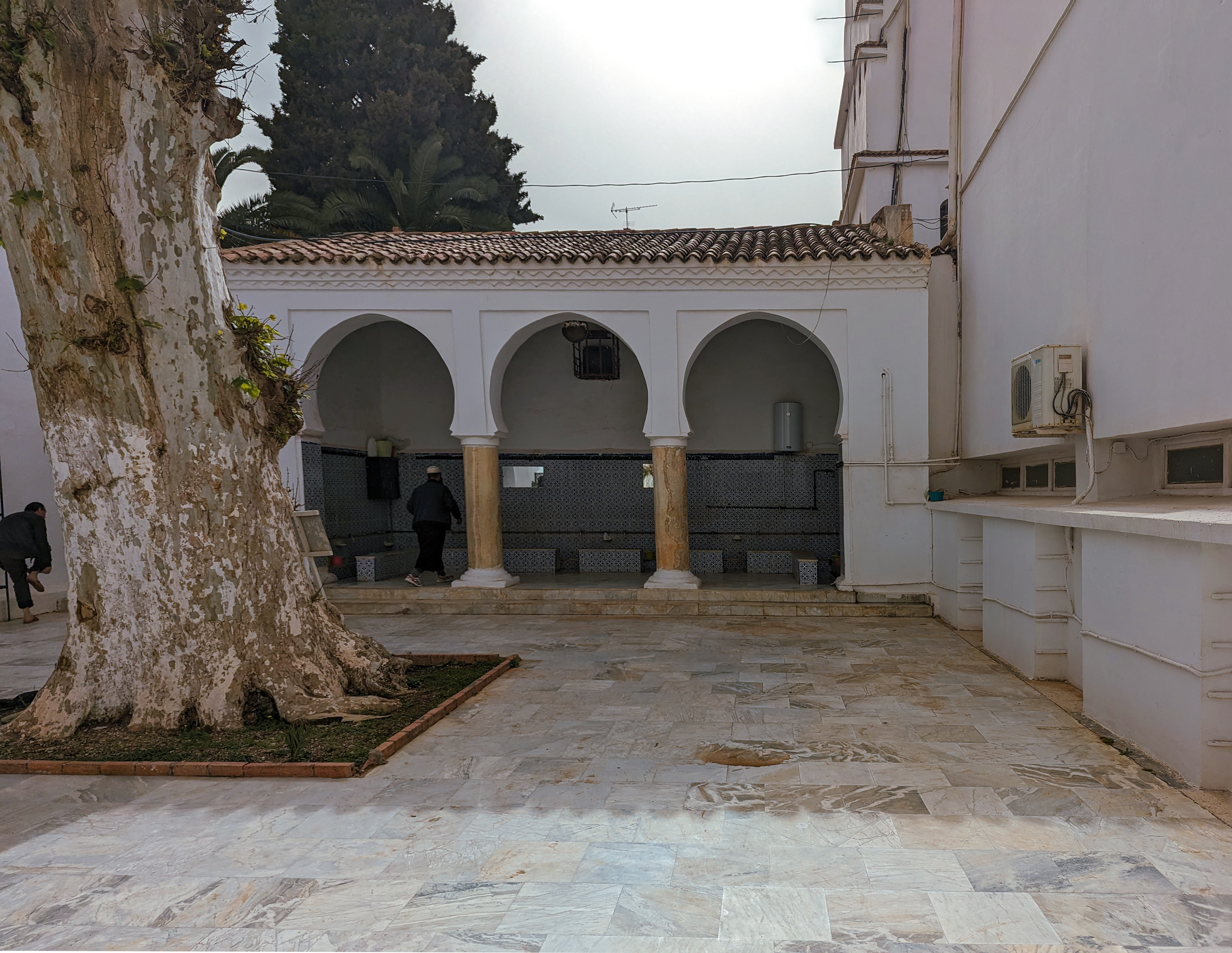

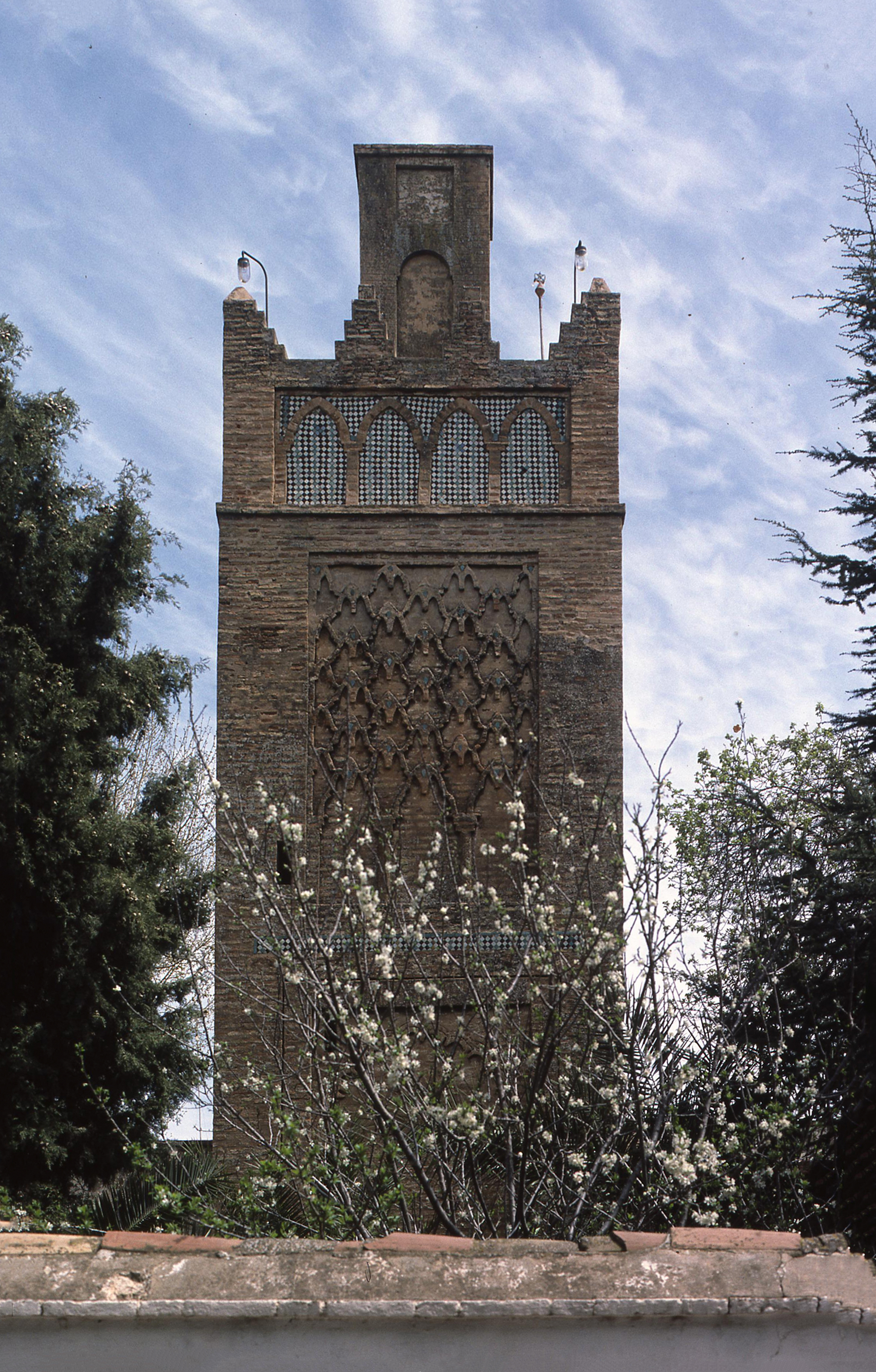

== See also ==
- Islam in Algeria
- List of mosques in Algeria
- List of cultural assets of Algeria in Tlemcen
