= Great Mosque of Nedroma =

Mosque in Nedroma, Tlemcen, Algeria

- الجامع الكبير بندرومة
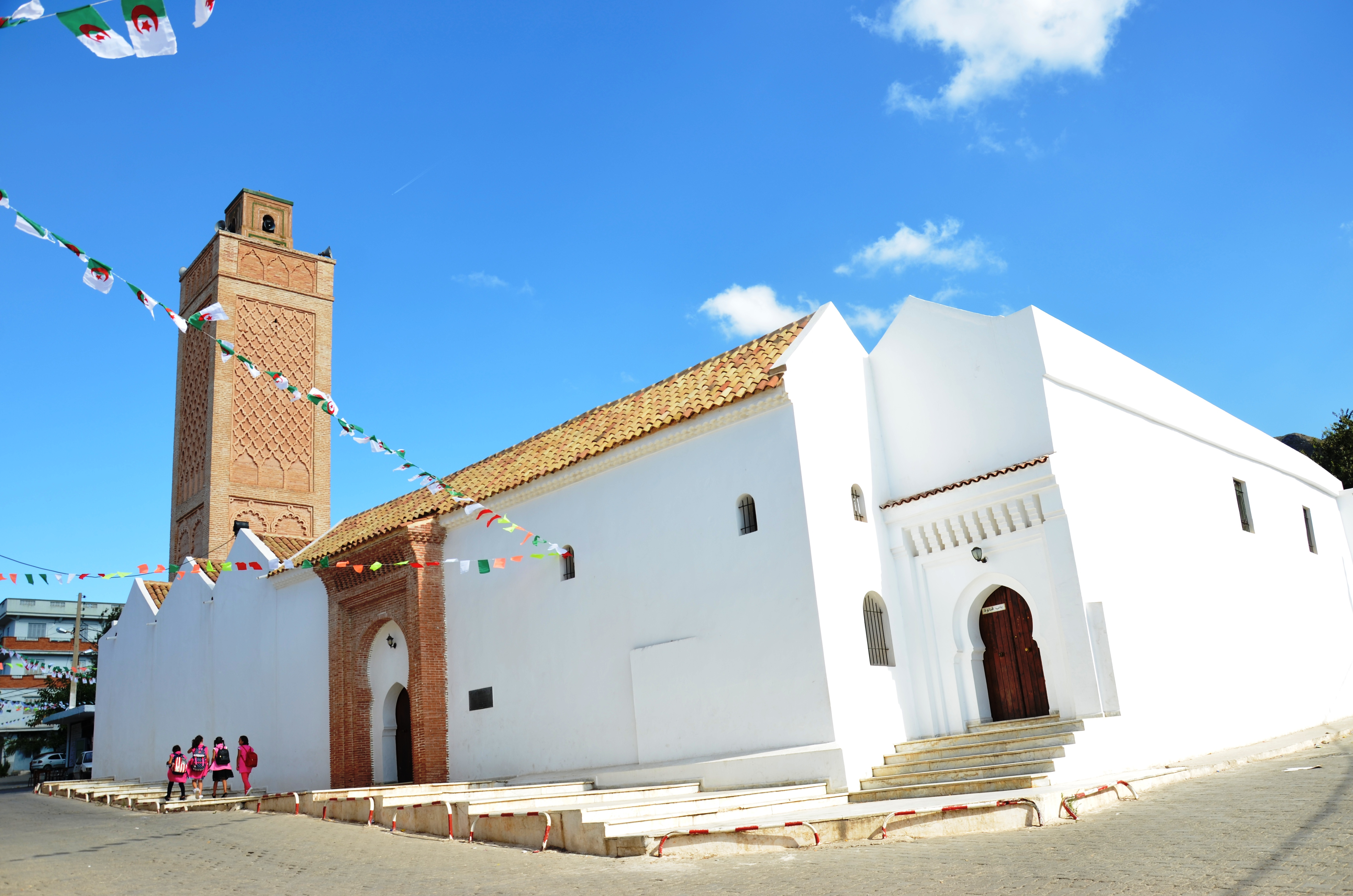

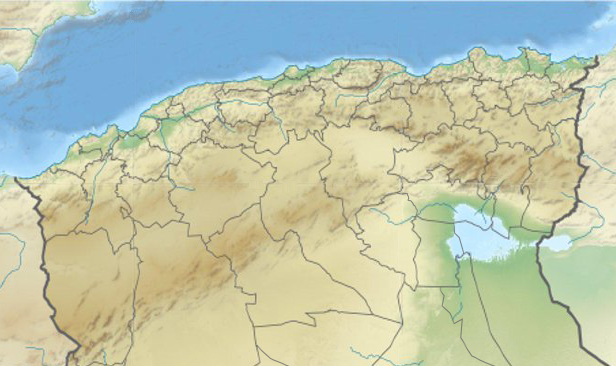
- Location of the mosque in northern Algeria

Religion
- Affiliation: Islam
- Ecclesiastical or organisational status: Mosque
- Status: Active
- Notable feature: Almoravid minbar

Location
- Location: Nedroma, Tlemcen Province
- Country: Algeria
- Interactive map of Great Mosque of Nedroma
- Coordinates: 35°00′30″N 1°44′48″W

Architecture
- Founder: Tashfin ibn ʿAli
- Completed: 1145 CE (mosque); 1348 CE (minaret)

Specifications
- Minaret: 1
- Materials: Marble; terracotta

The Great Mosque of Nedroma (Arabic: الجامع الكبير بندرومة), commonly known as the Great Mosque (Arabic: الجامع الكبير), is a mosque in the city of Nedroma, situated approximately 77 kilometres (48 mi) from the city of Tlemcen, in the Tlemcen Province, in northern Algeria. The mosque was founded in 1145 CE and contains the earliest surviving Almoravid minbar.

The mosque was added to the list of cultural heritage monuments of Algeria.

== Architecture ==
The mosque, as is with the other Almoravid religious buildings of the same era, follows the similar construction plan. The plan consists of a rectangular sahn in the middle surrounded by walls and a nave perpendicular to the qibla wall. The prayer hall contains nine naves equally distributed to the south of the central nave. Three naves are connected to the short side of the sahn and form a gallery. The longest side of the sahn runs parallel with the qibla wall and it is enclosed by the gallery.

From the top, the building is rectangular shaped and covered with the roof of tiled slopes which are parallel to one another. The central roof is slightly wider and ends with a cross vault above the mihrab. Horseshoe arch rests on the pillars which divide the naves. The mihrab does not contain any decorations. The minaret was added in 1348 CE, according to the scripture available inside the prayer hall.

The date of construction is inscribed on the minbar commissioned specifically for the mosque, and on the part of the marble which is used for the minaret.

== Gallery ==
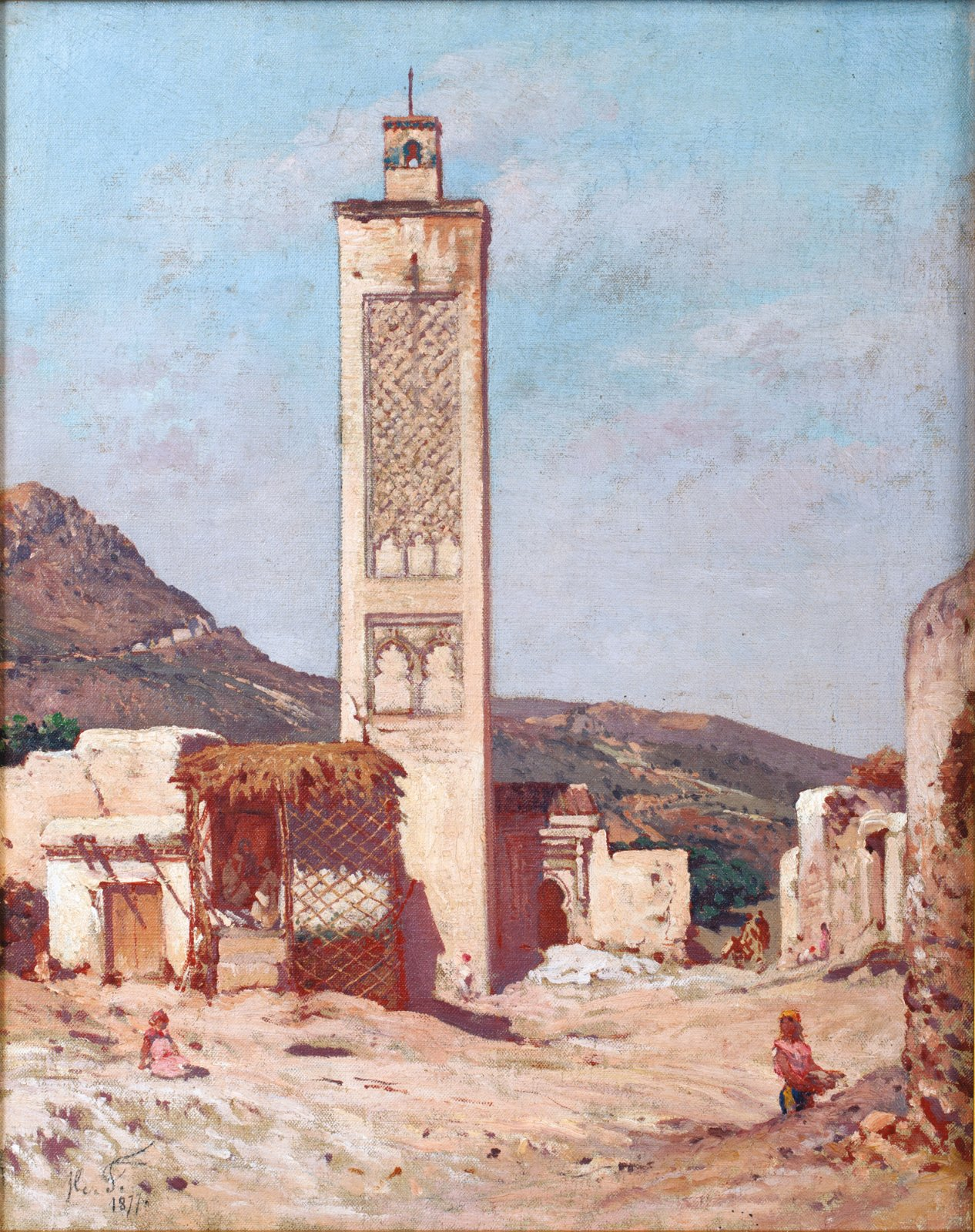
The mosque in 1877

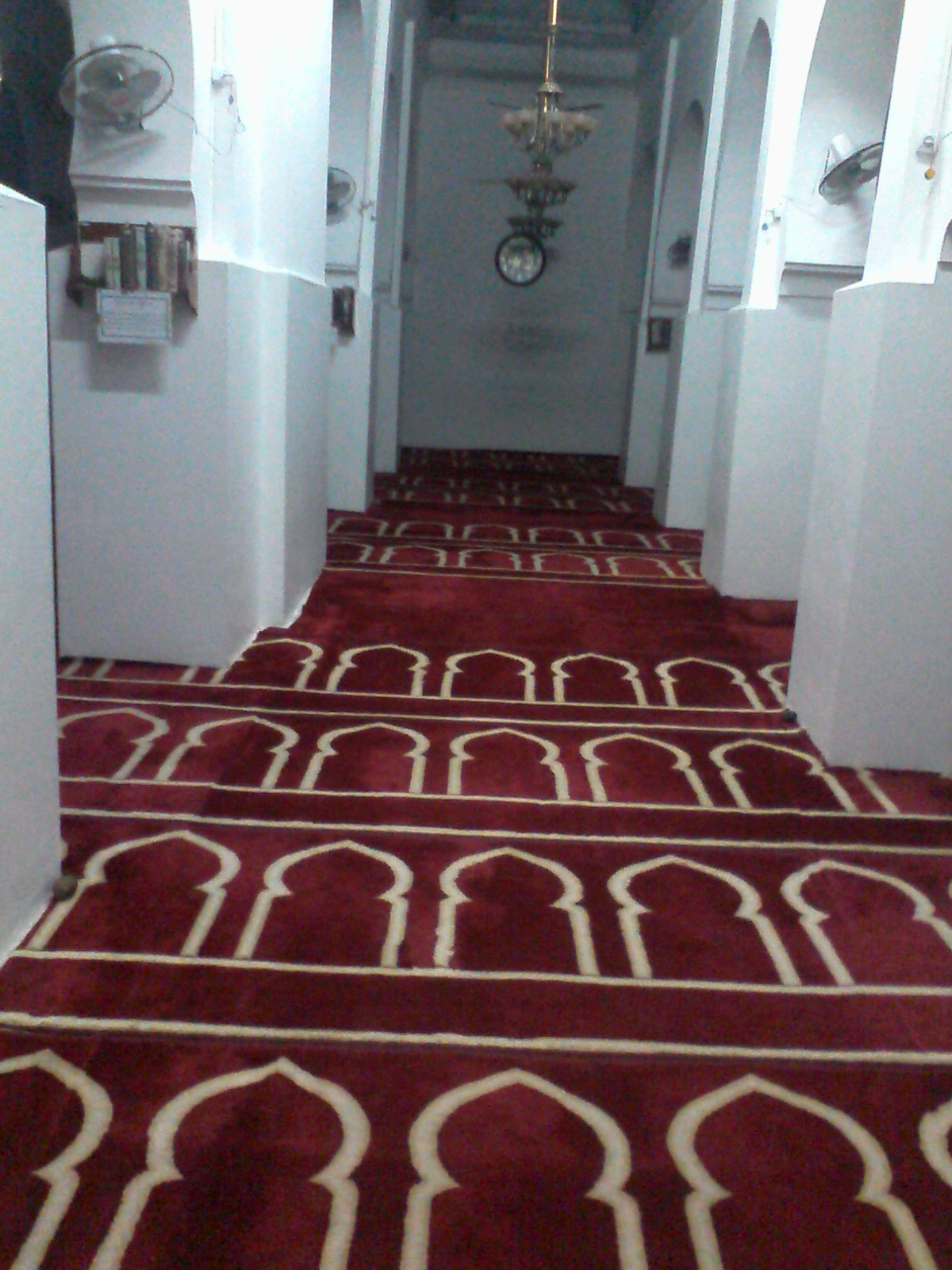
The mosque interior

== See also ==
- Islam in Algeria
- List of mosques in Algeria
- List of cultural assets of Algeria in Tlemcen Province
