= Bahia Center =

Coordinates: 35.7112°N 0.6248°W

Bahia Center Towers
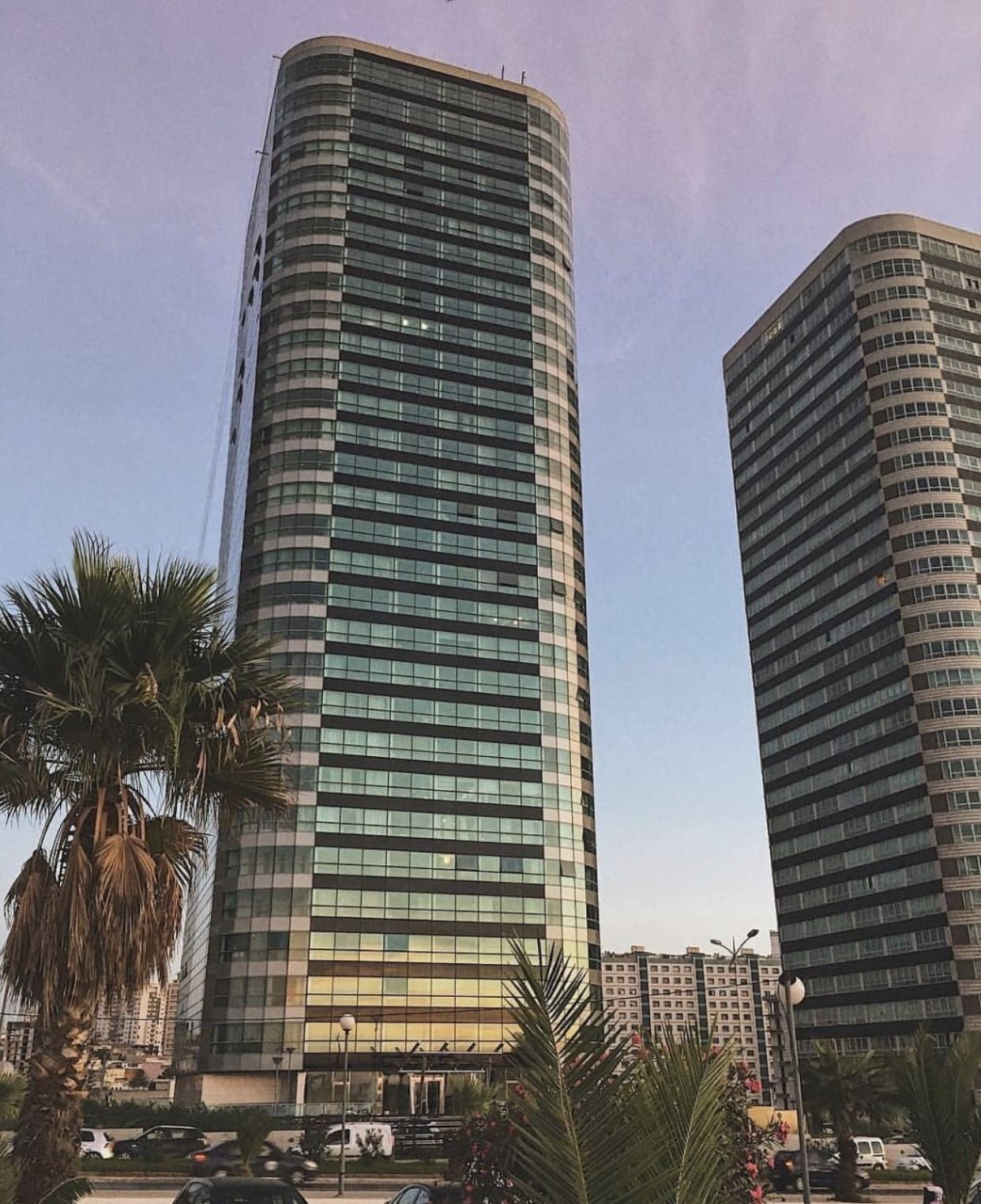

General information
- Status: Completed
- Type: Residential
- Location: Route Sidi Mohammed; Oran, Algeria
- Estimated completion: 2008-2013
- Opening: 2014

Height
- Roof: Tower 1: 111 m (364 ft); Tower 2: 111 m (364 ft); Tower 3: 111 m (364 ft); Tower 4: 111 m (364 ft)

Technical details
- Floor count: Tower 1: 31; Tower 2: 31; Tower 3: 31; Tower 4: 31

Design and construction
- Developer: MobilArt

Website
- www.skyscrapercenter.com/complex/1010

References
- Skyscraper Page

Bahia Center (Arabic: مركز الباهية) is a complex of 31-story skyscrapers in Oran, Algeria. The first of the 31-floor towers houses a shopping mall and a 500-room hotel. It is the second tallest building in Oran, and the fifth tallest building in Algeria, Bahia Center Tower was designed by MobilArt.
