= Imam al-Houari Mosque =

Mosque in Oran, Algeria

- مسجد بك محمد عثمان الكبير
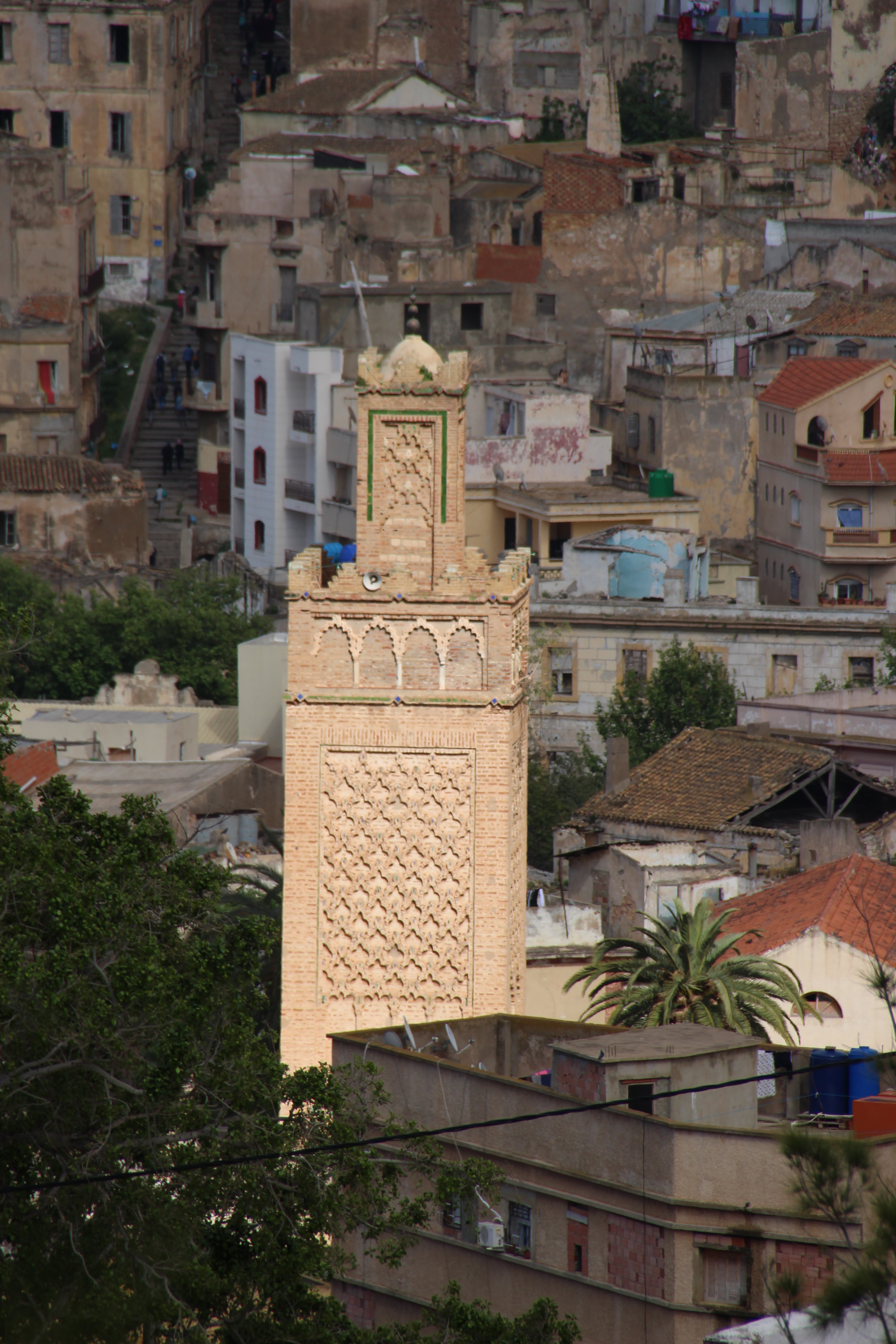
- The mosque's minaret, in 2018

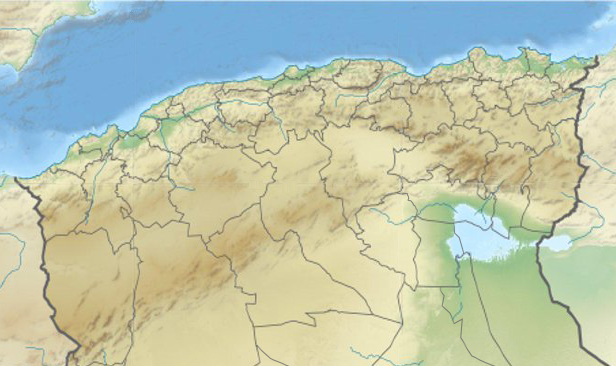
- Location of the mosque in northern Algeria

Religion
- Affiliation: Sunni Islam
- Rite: Sufism
- Ecclesiastical or organizational status: Mosque
- Status: Active

Location
- Location: Oran, Oran Province
- Country: Algeria
- Interactive map of Imam al-Houari Mosque
- Coordinates: 35°42′16″N 0°39′16″W

Architecture
- Type: Islamic architecture
- Style: Algerian
- Founder: Bey Mohammed Ben Othmane
- Completed: 1793 (minaret); 1799 (mosque)
- Shrine: 1

The Imam al-Houari Mosque (Arabic: مسجد الامام الهواري; French: Mosquée imam el-Houari), also known as the Imam Sidi el-Houari Mosque and as the Bey Mohamed Othman Al Kabir Mosque (مسجد بك محمد عثمان الكبير; Mosquée Bey Mohamed Othman El-Kébir) after Baba Mohammed ben-Osman, the Dey of the Deylik of Algiers, is a Sunni mosque located in Oran, Algeria.

== Overview ==
An inscription on a marble plaque embedded in the base of the minaret records the year and credits its founder: …ordered the construction of this minaret … Mohammed Ben Othmane, Bey of the western province of Tlemcen…, dated 1207 AH (1792/1793 CE).

The mosque was repurposed as a military hospital during the early years of French occupation. After occupation, the prayer hall was rebuilt, though it lacked distinctive architectural features. The minaret retained much of its original ornamentation and its square base and decorative motifs are reminiscent of the medieval mosques of Tlemcen, known for their intricate geometric patterns. The minaret’s decoration varies by side. On the north and south, the pattern forms a trilobed arch resting on two arches, while the east and west sides display a lambrequin arch supported by four arches. This unique design, where adjacent sides feature different decorations, is also seen in the Agadir Minaret and the Sidi Bu Medyan minaret in Tlemcen.

In 1889, the minaret was listed as a historic monument under the name Minaret du Campement. After independence, the mosque was renamed Mohammed Bey Othman El Kebir. However, it kept the name of Sidi El Houari, a Sufi saint and the patron saint of the city of Oran, who died in this city in 1439, and whose tomb is located 200 metres (660 ft) from the mosque.

== See also ==
- Islam in Algeria
- List of mosques in Algeria
