= Sidi Boumediene Mosque =

Mosque in Tlemcen, Algeria

- مسجد شعيب أبو مدين
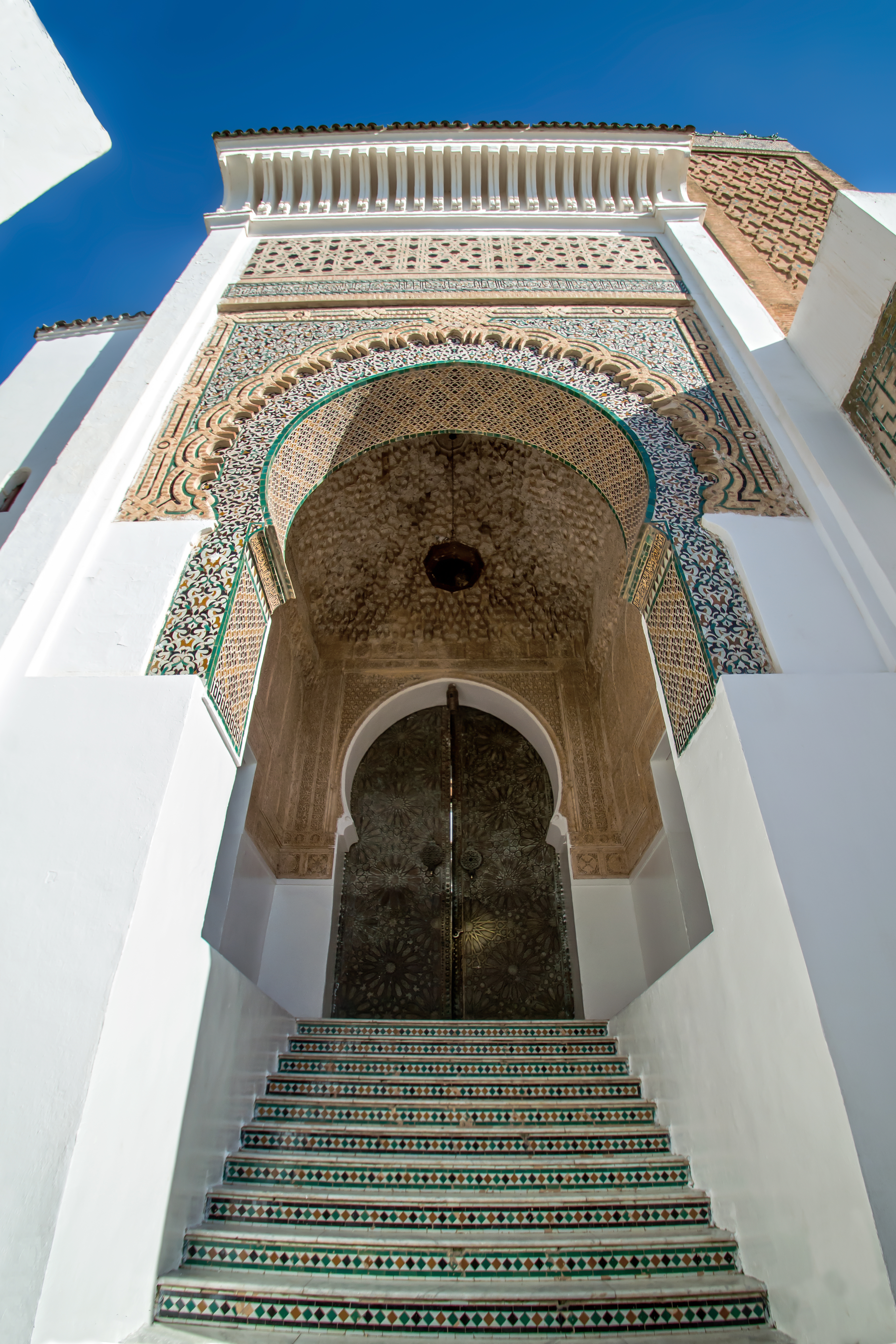
- Entrance of the mosque

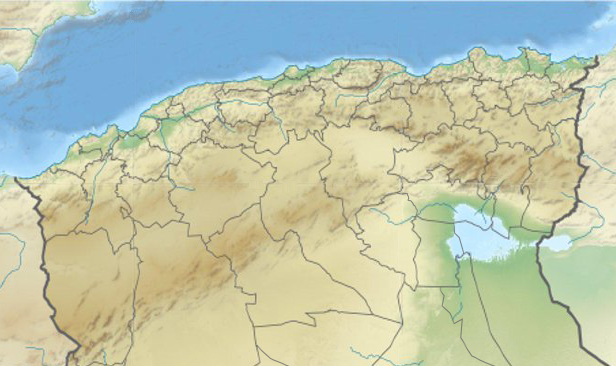
- Location of the mosque in northern Algeria

Religion
- Affiliation: Sunni Islam
- Status: Active

Location
- Location: Tlemcen, Tlemcen Province
- Country: Algeria
- Interactive map of Sidi Boumediene Mosque
- Coordinates: 34°52′40″N 1°17′23″W

Architecture
- Type: Mosque; Madrasa; Mausoleum
- Style: Moorish
- Founder: Abu al-Hasan
- Established: 1339 CE

Specifications
- Minaret: 1
- Shrine: 1: Abu Madyan

The Sidi Boumediene Mosque (Arabic: مسجد شعيب أبو مدين) is a Sunni mosque and associated religious complex located in Tlemcen, Algeria. The complex comprises a mosque, madrasa and mausoleum dedicated to the influential Sufi saint Abu Madyan. Abu Madyan hailed from Seville and contributed greatly to the spread of tasawwuf in the Maghreb region.

== History ==
The mosque was founded by the Marinid rulers in 1339 CE. The madrasa was founded eight years after the mosque, where Ibn Khaldun had taught once. The Dar al-Sultan palace was established as well in the lower point of the complex, where the sultans stayed during their visit to the mosque. The Sidi al-Haloui Mosque, built in 1353, was closely modelled on it.

== Architecture ==
The complex contains several religious buildings including the mosque, mausoleum, madrasa and the hamam. The mosque has the main entrance resembling that of the several other Moorish architectures from Córdoba to Kairouan. The entrance leads to the gallery of plaster paintings. On top of the dome exists muqarnas. It continues to the stairs which resemble that of the Puerta del Sol, Toledo. The wooden doors are decorated with bronze, and they lead to the sahn with the fountain in the middle and surrounded by corridors and prayer hall.

== Gallery ==
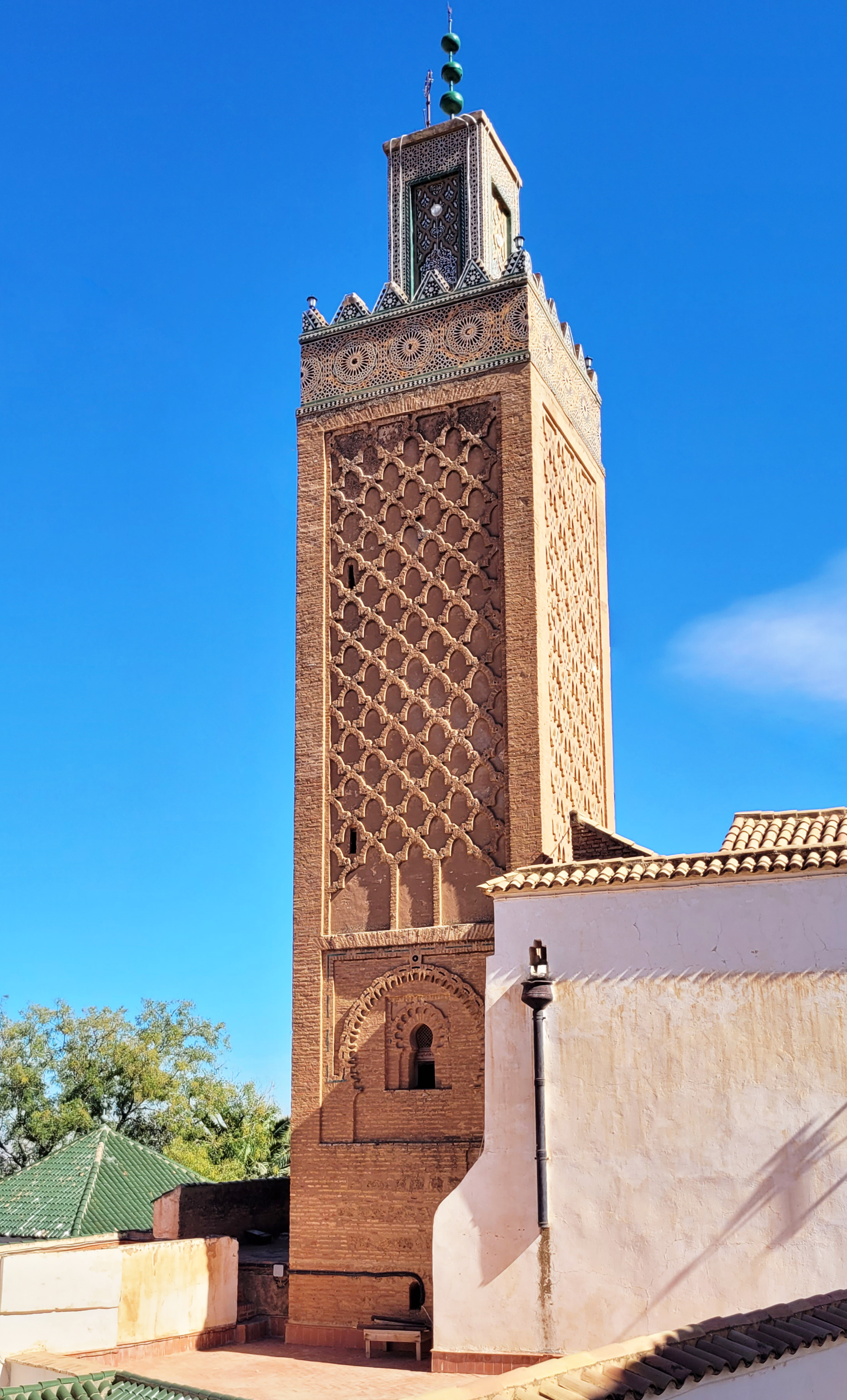
Minaret of the mosque

Prayer hall, 1889-1890

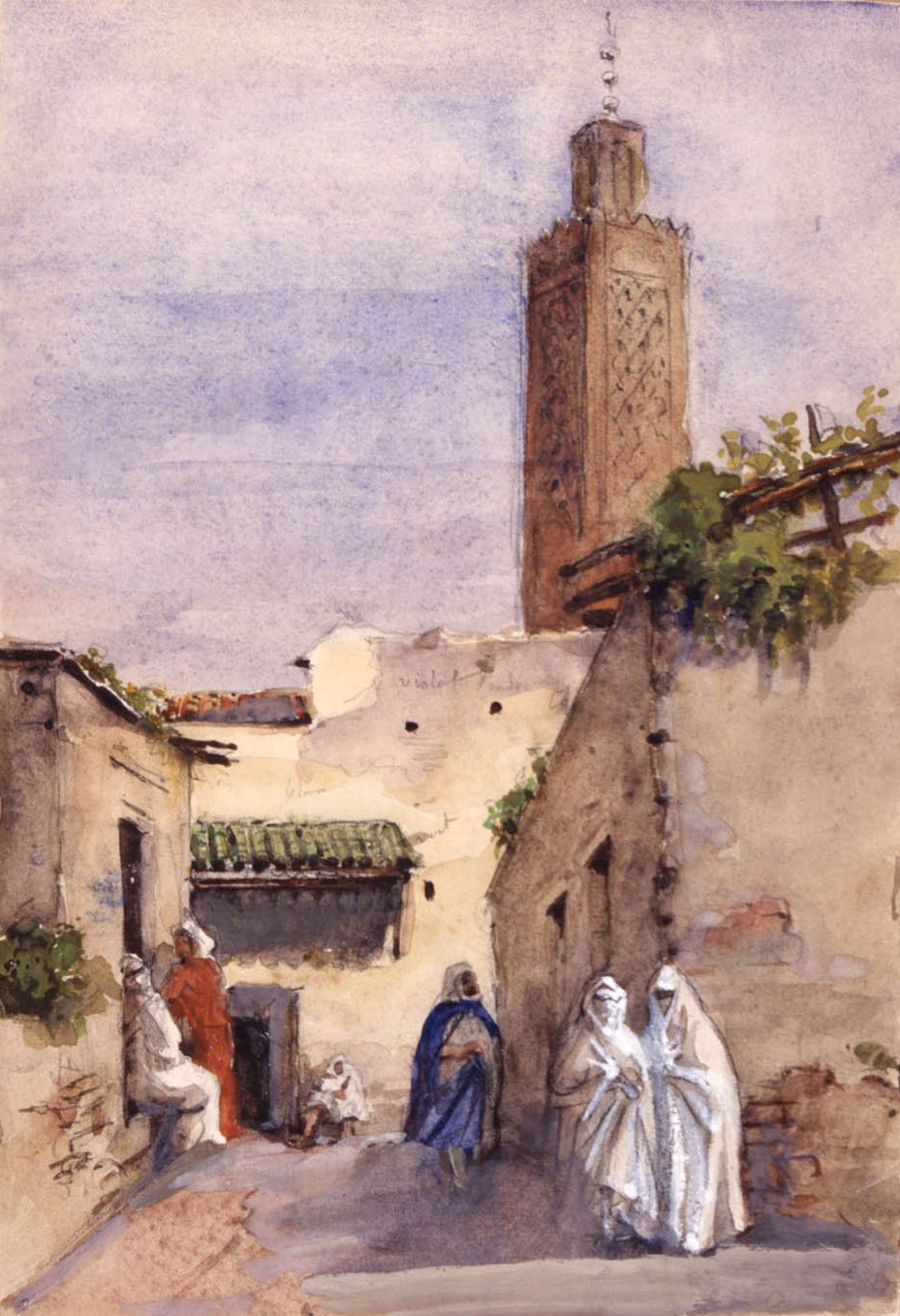
The mosque, painted by Fritz von Dardel in 1886

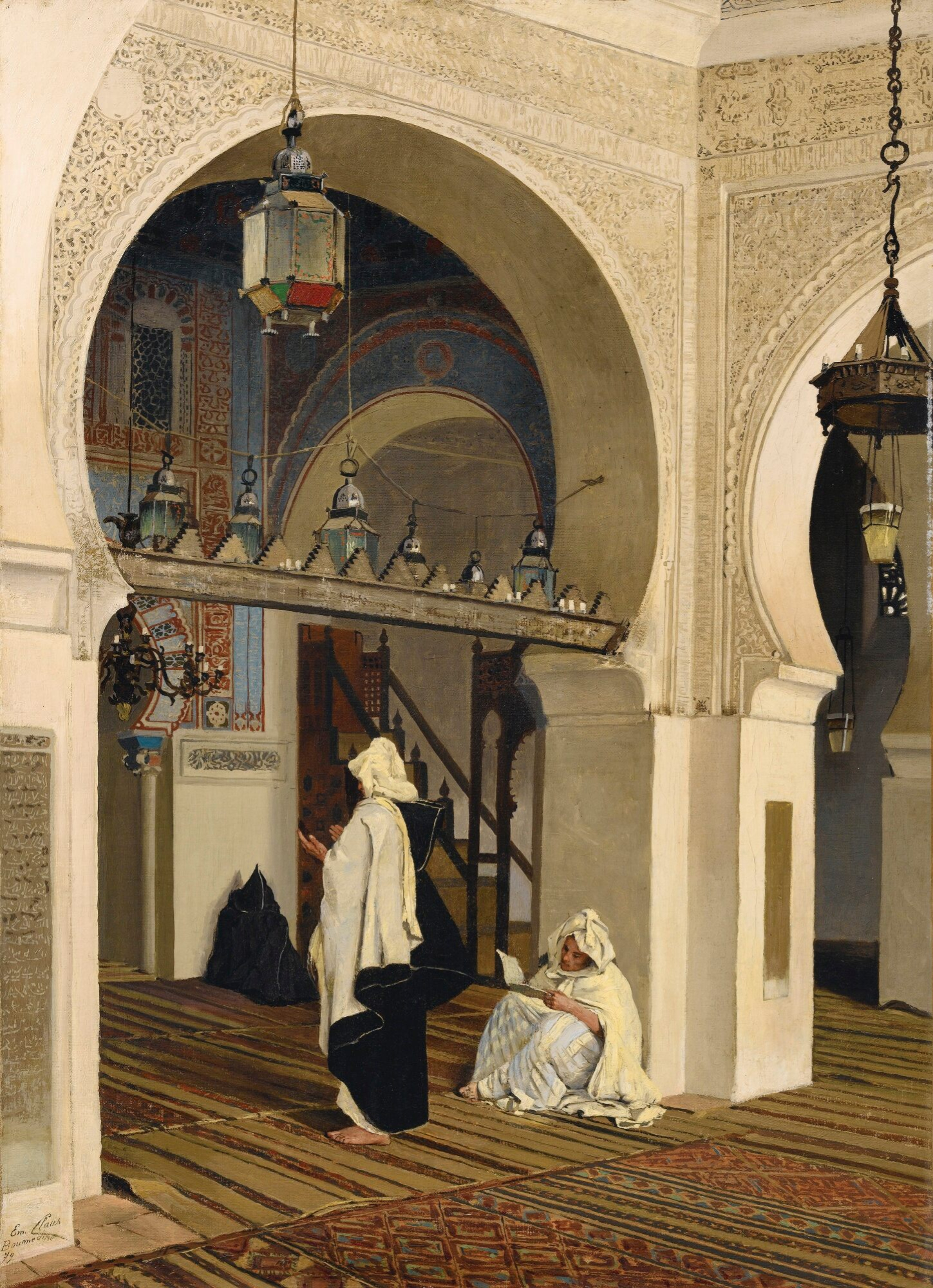

== See also ==
- Islam in Algeria
- List of mosques in Algeria
- List of cultural assets of Algeria in Tlemcen Province
