= Djamaa el Djazaïr =

Grand mosque in Algiers, Algeria

- جامع الجزائر
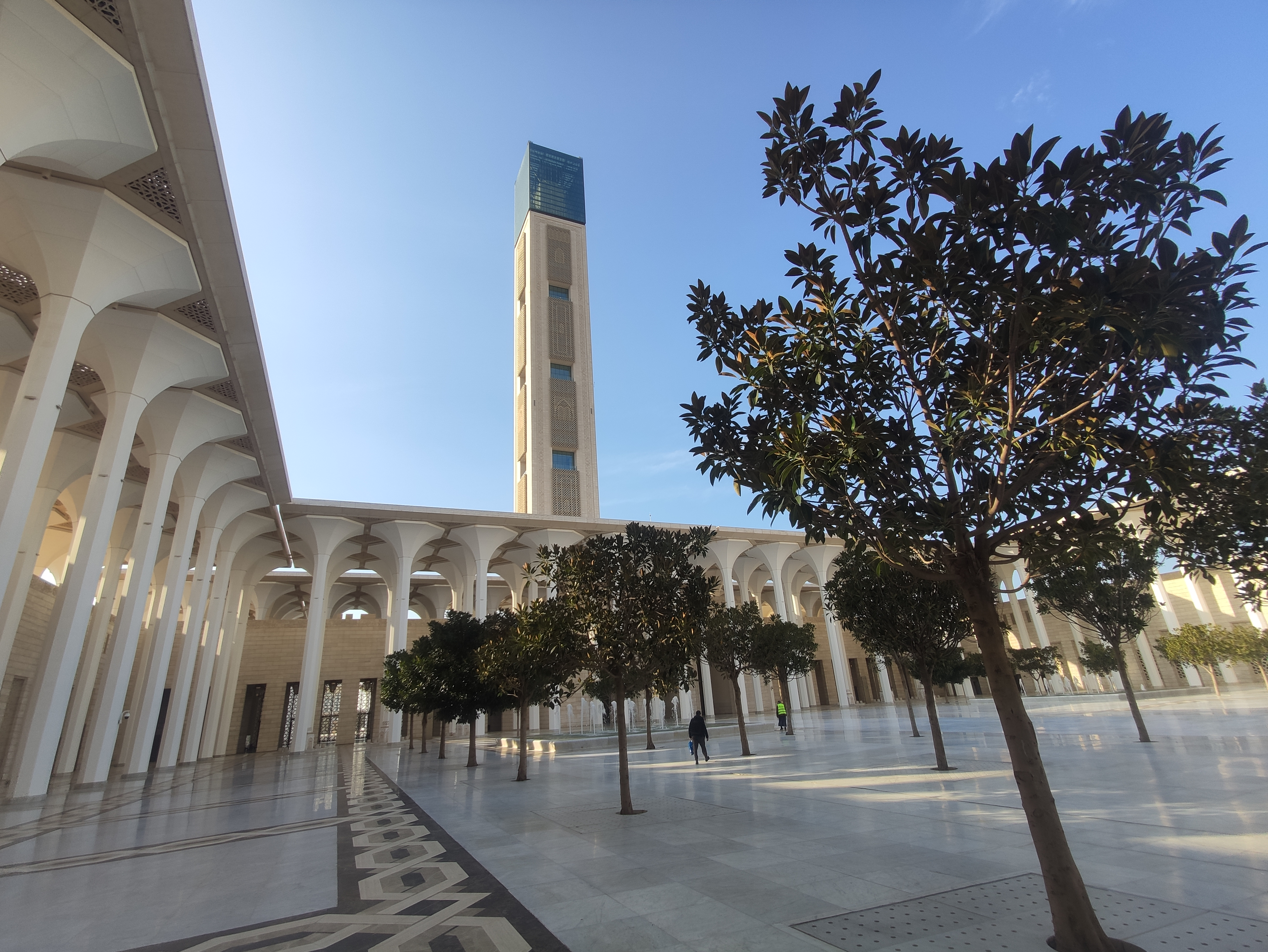
- The mosque and its minaret, viewed from the sahn, in 2023

- Location of the mosque in Algiers

Religion
- Affiliation: Islam
- Ecclesiastical or organizational status: Mosque
- Ownership: Ministry of Religious Affairs
- Status: Active

Location
- Location: Mohammadia, Dar El Beïda District, Algiers
- Country: Algeria
- Interactive map of Djamaa el Djazaïr
- Coordinates: 36°44′09″N 3°08′17″E

Architecture
- Architects: KSP Jürgen Engel Architekten; Krebs und Kiefer
- Type: Islamic architecture
- Style: Algerian; Modern
- General contractor: China State Construction Engineering (CSCEC)
- Groundbreaking: 2012
- Completed: 2019
- Construction cost: $898 million

Specifications
- Capacity: 120,000 worshippers
- Interior area: 22,000 m^{2} (240,000 sq ft)
- Dome: 1
- Dome height (outer): 70 m (230 ft)
- Dome dia. (outer): 50 m (160 ft)
- Minaret: 1
- Minaret height: 265 m (869 ft)
- Site area: 27.75 ha (68.6 acres)

Website
- eldjamaa.dz
- Building details

Record height
- Tallest in Africa from 29 April 2019 to 2024^{[I]}
- Preceded by: The Leonardo, South Africa
- Surpassed by: Iconic Tower

Technical details
- Floor count: 37

The Djamaa el Djazaïr (Arabic: جامع الجزائر), also known as the Great Mosque of Algiers, is a large mosque located in Mohammadia, in the Dar El Beïda District of Algiers, Algeria. Opened in April 2019, it houses the world's tallest minaret that is 265 metres (869 ft) high, and is the third-largest mosque in the world after the Great Mosque of Mecca and Al-Masjid an-Nabawi of Medina in Saudi Arabia.

The mosque features a prayer hall (salat) with an area of 22,000 square metres (240,000 sq ft), capable of accommodating 120,000 worshippers. The central nave of this hall is surrounded by colonnades, with the mihrab located to the east, made of white marble. The hall is topped by a dome with a diameter of 50 metres (160 ft), reaching a height of 70 metres (230 ft).

== History ==
The project to provide the capital Algiers with a grand mosque was presented as an initiative of the former Algerian president Abdelaziz Bouteflika to mark his presidential mandates.

The German consortium that designed the Djamaa el Djazaïr consisted of architectural firms KSP Jürgen Engel Architekten and Krebs und Kiefer until 2016. This German consortium won the international architectural competition for the project in January 2008, and the contract was signed in July 2008 for the execution in the presence of the German Chancellor Angela Merkel.

The commission included general design and execution studies for all disciplines, as well as monitoring and control of the construction works of the Djamaa el Djazaïr. The design team consisted of over 100 architects and engineers. In 2007, the engineering and construction company Dessau-Soprin obtained the project management contract.

The Chinese company China State Construction Engineering (CSCEC) was tasked with the construction of the Djamaa el Djazaïr. The first concrete foundation casting operations began on 16 August 2012, after a launching ceremony. The construction was expected to create 17,000 jobs, with 10,000 workers from China and 7,000 from Algeria.

The French engineering firm Socotec later joined the project. The French consulting firm Egis oversaw the construction from February 2016 to verify the additional plans provided by CSCEC.

Djamaa el Djazaïr was financed by the Algerian state with an initial budget of one billion euros (approximately US$1.5 billion). The official cost of the mosque was $898 million. The construction took seven years.

The construction was criticized for its monumental aspect and its expensive costs. Despite some criticisms, the inauguration and the first prayer inside the mosque attracted a large crowd of Algerian faithful.

== Architecture ==
The architecture of the mosque is based on square geometry combining modern and traditional styles. It evokes the oldest type of mosque, with colonnades opening upwards like a flower while providing space for technical conduits.

The mosque sits on a site covering 27.75 hectares (68.6 acres) and overlooks the Mediterranean Sea. The prayer hall has a capacity of 37,000 worshippers, while the structure including the compound can house up to 120,000 worshippers and has parking space for 7,000 cars. The complex also houses a Quran school, a park, a library, staff housing area, a fire station, a museum of Islamic art, and a research center on the history of Algeria.

The mosque also has a 265-metre-tall (869 ft) minaret, the tallest in the world, which due to containing office space also meets the definition of a building, and was the tallest building in Africa until overtaken in 2024 by the Iconic Tower in Egypt's New Administrative Capital. It also houses an observation deck atop the minaret, which has 37 floors. The mosque is designed to withstand an earthquake of magnitude 9.0 and the structure has been specially processed to resist corrosion. The main prayer hall has 618 octagonal columns serving as support pillars and 6 kilometres (3.7 mi) of calligraphy engraved with a laser system. The dome of the prayer hall has a diameter of 50 metres (160 ft) and rises to a height of 70 metres (230 ft).

== Access ==
Several roads and other means of access lead to Djamaâ El Djazaïr from the Algiers suburbs. It can be accessed by car via the northern ring road of Algiers, taking the Mohammadia/Grande Mosque exit.

The Algiers tramway provides access via the Pont El Harrach and Bellevue stations, located within a 10-minute walking distance of the mosque. The ETUSA bus line B19 passes near the mosque, which can connect it to the metro line M1 or to the Algiers commuter rail network via the Caroubier station. It will soon be possible to access the mosque by boat via the Algiers Marina project, north of the mosque, where a maritime terminal will be built. The mosque also has a helipad.

== Gallery ==
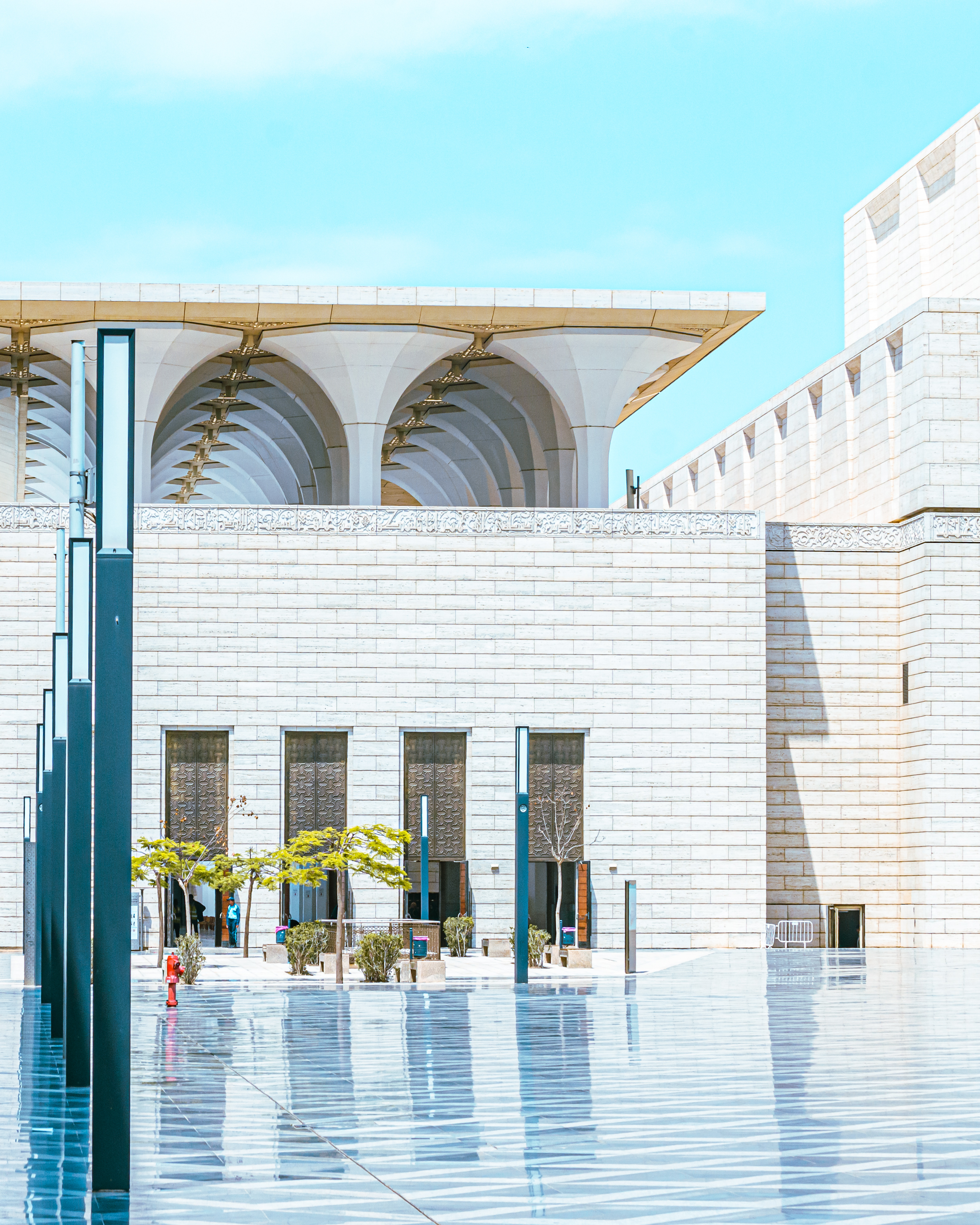
The mosque sahn

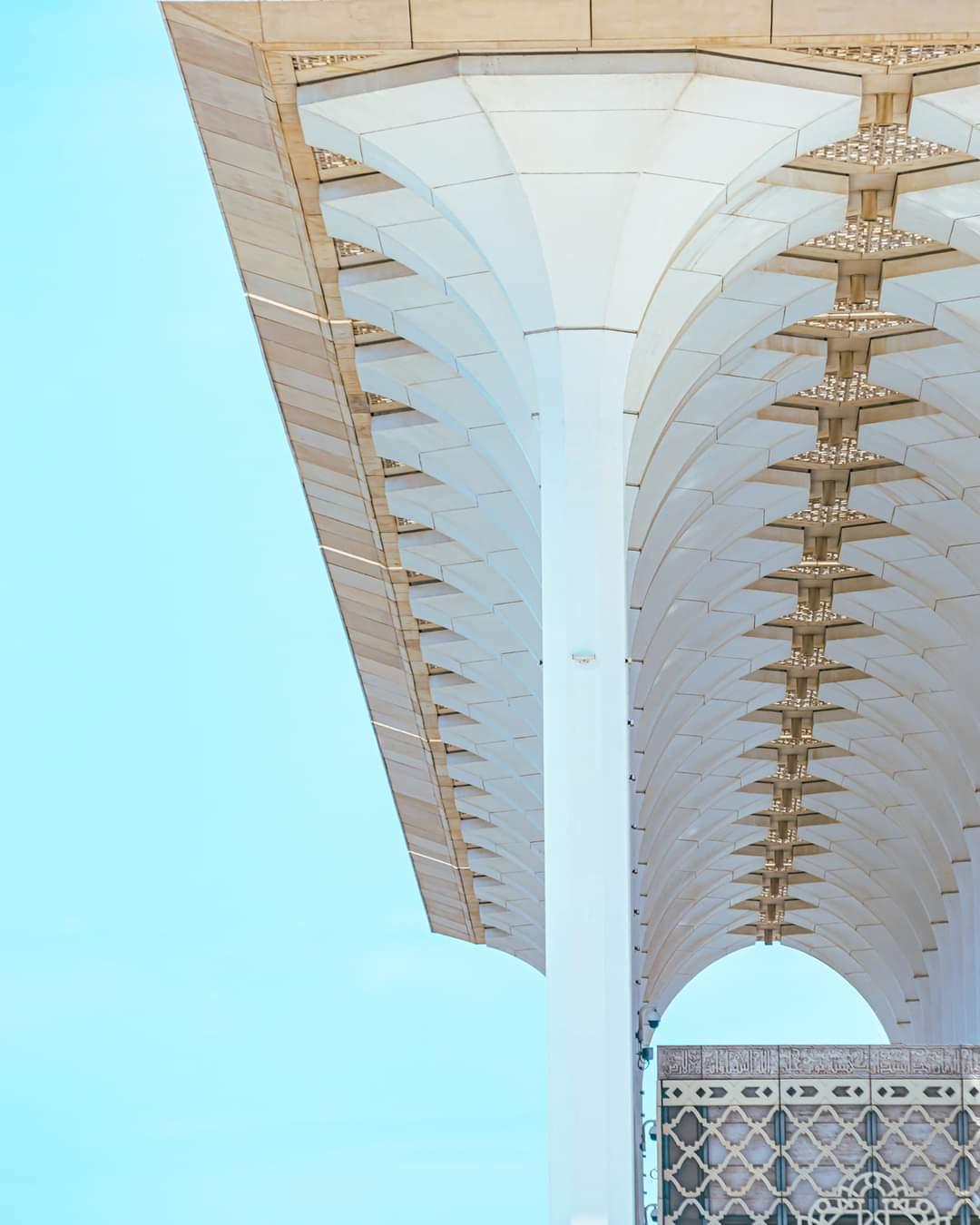
Architecture of the pillars

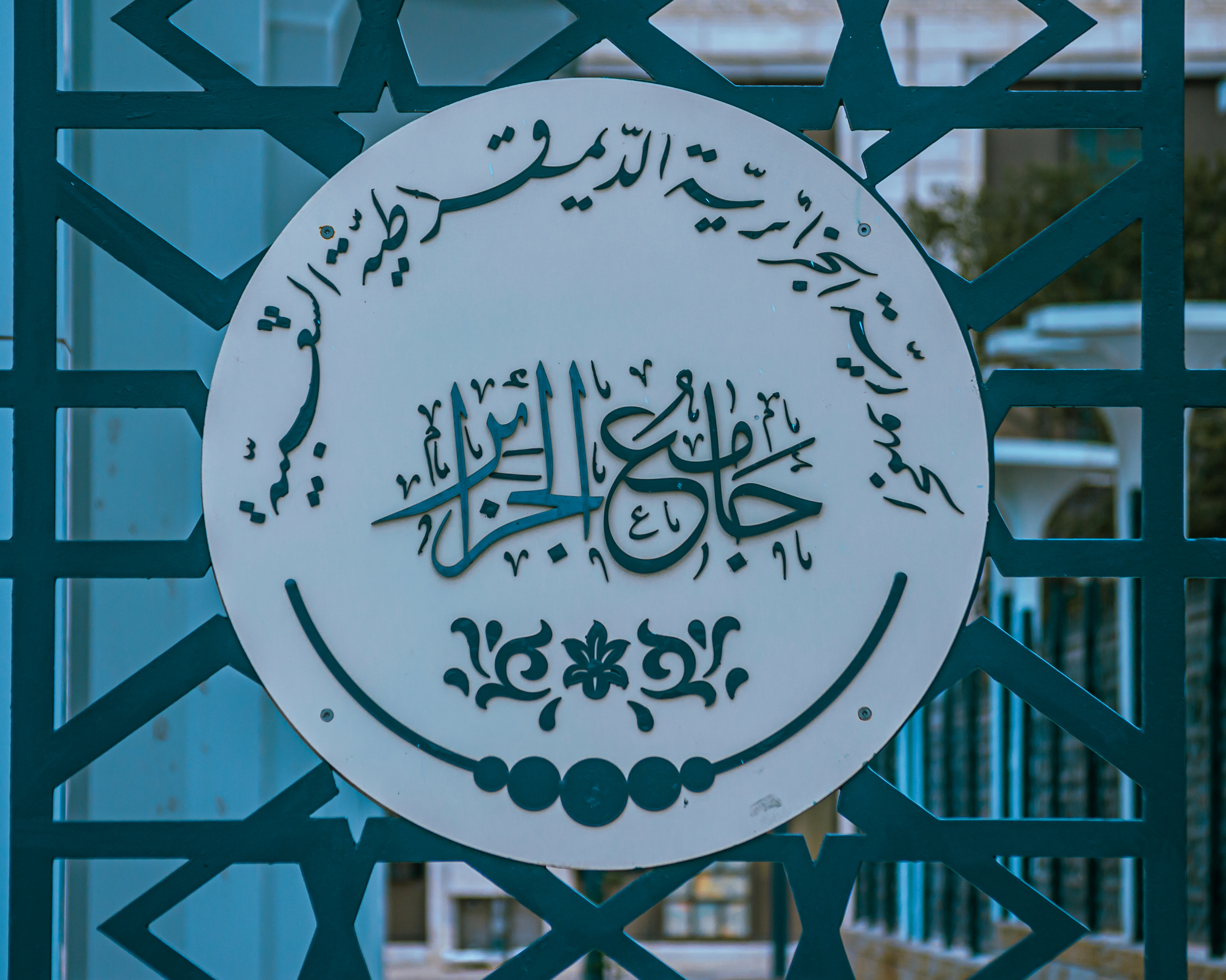
The mosque's logo in Arabic typography

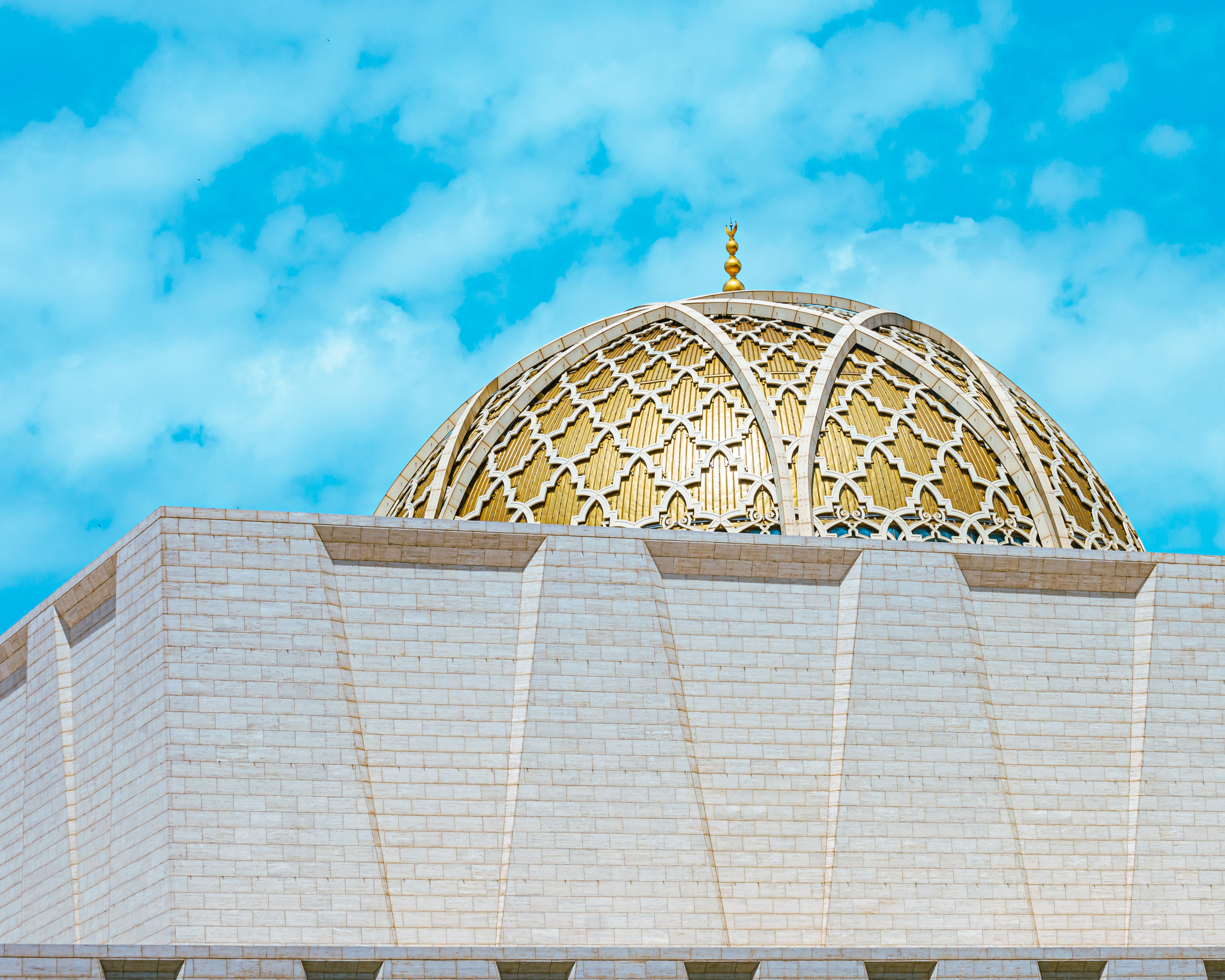
The dome

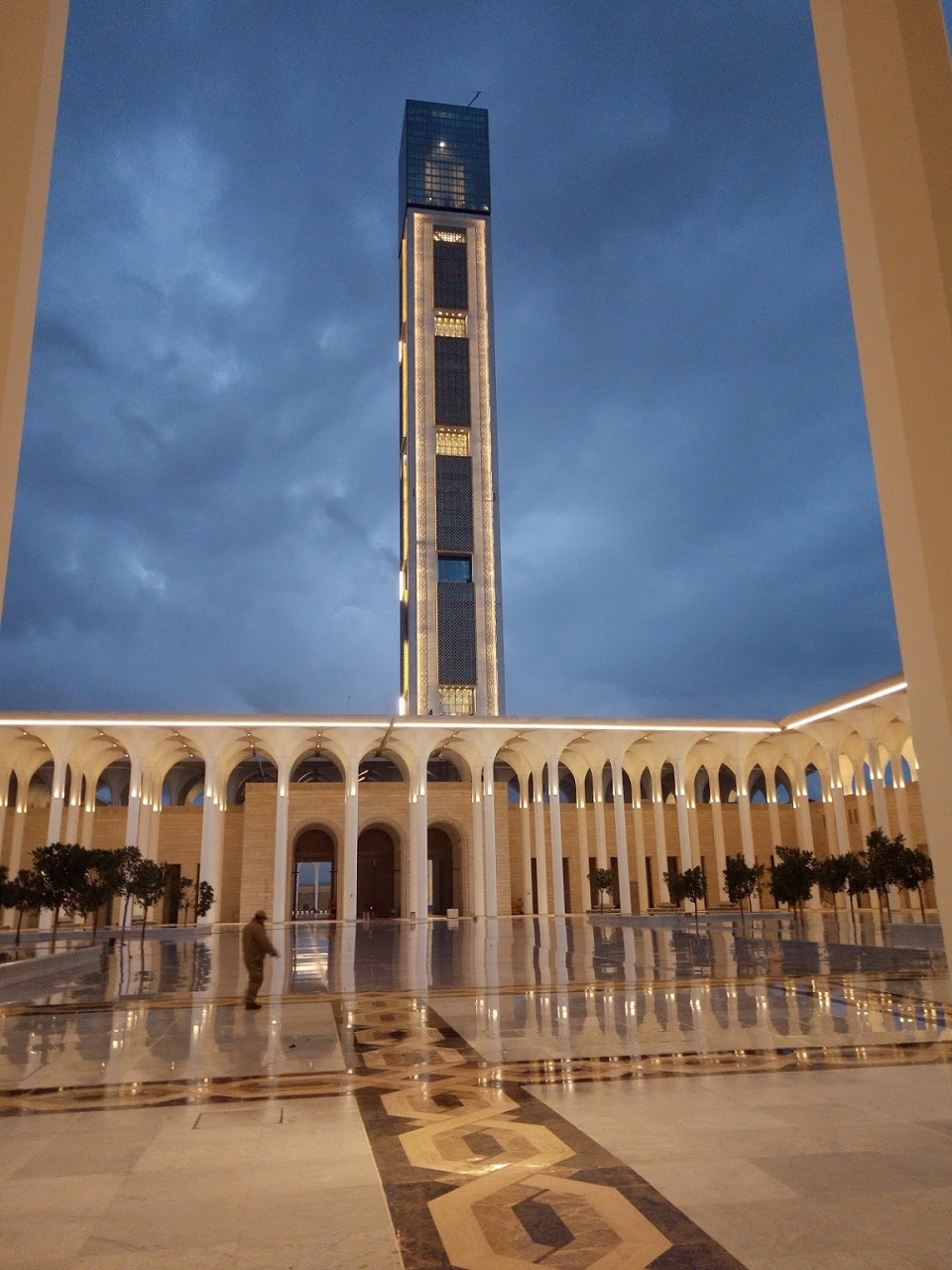
A view of the mosque minaret

== See also ==
- Islam in Algeria
- List of mosques in Algeria
- List of tallest buildings in Algeria
- List of cultural assets of Algeria
- List of most expensive buildings

Records
Preceded by Cairo Tower	Tallest free-standing structure in North Africa; 264 m (867 ft); 2019 – 2024	Succeeded by Iconic Tower
Preceded by The Leonardo	Tallest building in Africa; 264 m (867 ft); 2019 – 2024	Succeeded by Iconic Tower
Preceded by Résidence Oran Tower	Tallest building in Algeria; 264 m (867 ft); 2019 – present	Incumbent
Preceded by Holiday Inn Algiers - Cheraga Tower	Tallest building in Algiers; 264 m (867 ft); 2019 – present	Incumbent
