= Sidi El Haloui Mosque =

Mosque in Tlemcen, Algeria

- مسجد سيدي الحلوي
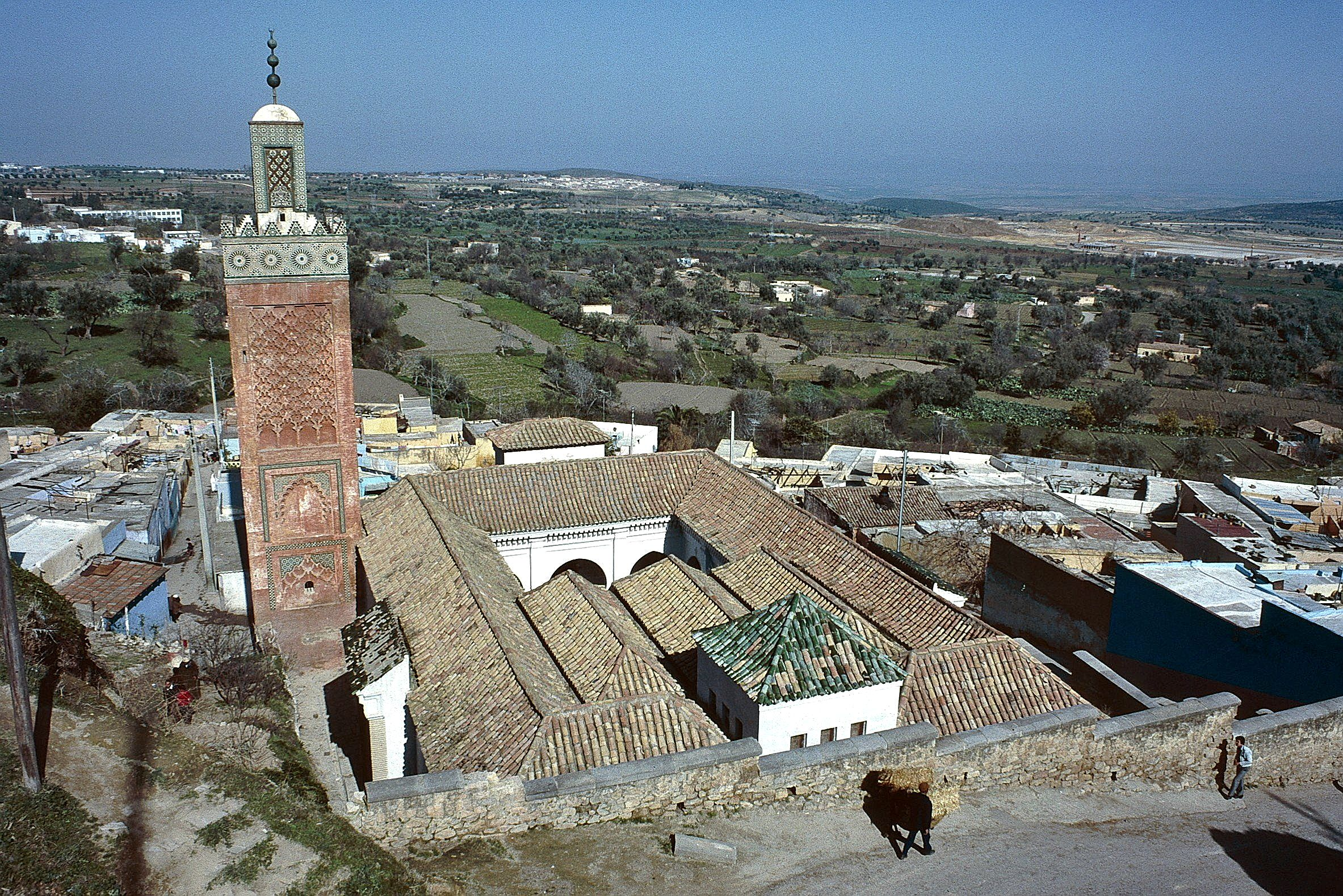
- Aerial view of the mosque in 1976

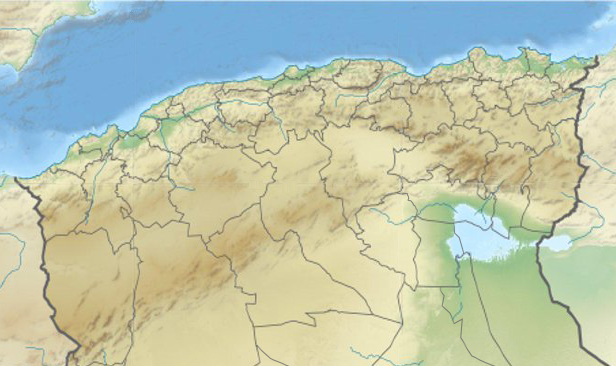
- Location of the mosque in northern Algeria

Religion
- Affiliation: Sunni Islam
- Ecclesiastical or organizational status: Mosque; Mausoleum
- Status: Active

Location
- Location: Tlemcen
- Country: Algeria
- Interactive map of Sidi El Haloui Mosque
- Coordinates: 34°53′17″N 1°18′28.6″W

Architecture
- Type: Islamic architecture
- Founder: Abu Inan Faris
- Established: 754 AH (1353/1354 CE)

Specifications
- Minaret: 1
- Minaret height: 25 m (82 ft)

The Sidi El Haloui Mosque (Arabic: مسجد سيدي الحلوي; French: Mosquée Sidi El Haloui), also spelled as the Sidi el-Halwi Mosque, is a Sunni mosque and religious complex in Tlemcen, Algeria.

== History ==
The mosque is dedicated to Abū Abdallāh al-Shūdhī, known as Sīdī al-Halwī, a qadi from Seville who came to Tlemcen in the late 13th century. He was later accused of sorcery, probably as part of a defamatory plot, and executed either in 1305 or 1337 CE. Following the rehabilitation of his reputation, the Marinid sultan Abu Inan erected this religious complex next to his mausoleum in 754 AH (1353/1354 CE).

== Architecture ==
The historical complex consists of a mosque, the tomb of Sidi el Haloui built next to it, and an ablutions facility across the road. The complex also formerly included a madrasa and a zawiya, that has not survived. The mausoleum is a modest structure. The ablutions hall is covered by a central dome and contained latrines.

Similar in design to the Sidi Boumediene Mosque that was built by Abu Inan's father Abu al-Hasan in Tlemcen over a decade earlier, the Sidi El Haloui Mosque consists of a square sahn with a central fountain and surrounded by an arcaded riwaq, while on the south side of this is the prayer hall, a hypostyle hall divided by rows of pointed horseshoe arches into five naves or aisles. Unlike the Sidi Boumediene Mosque, the arches are not supported by pillars but by onyx columns. The columns were most likely taken from the former Palace of Victory at al-Mansourah, which was built by Abu al-Hasan. Some of these columns are also found in the mausoleum of Sidi Boumediene, probably added by Abu Inan there around the same time.

In the middle of the southeast wall is the mihrab, a hexagonal niche covered by a small muqarnas cupola. The mosque's minaret, approximately 25 metres (82 ft) high, stands at the northwest corner and its façades are decorated by interlacing sebka motifs. The rest of the mosque's original decoration, around the arches of the prayer hall and the outer entrance portal, has not been preserved.

== See also ==
- Islam in Algeria
- List of mosques in Algeria
