= El Barani Mosque =

Mosque in Algiers, Algeria

- مسجد براني
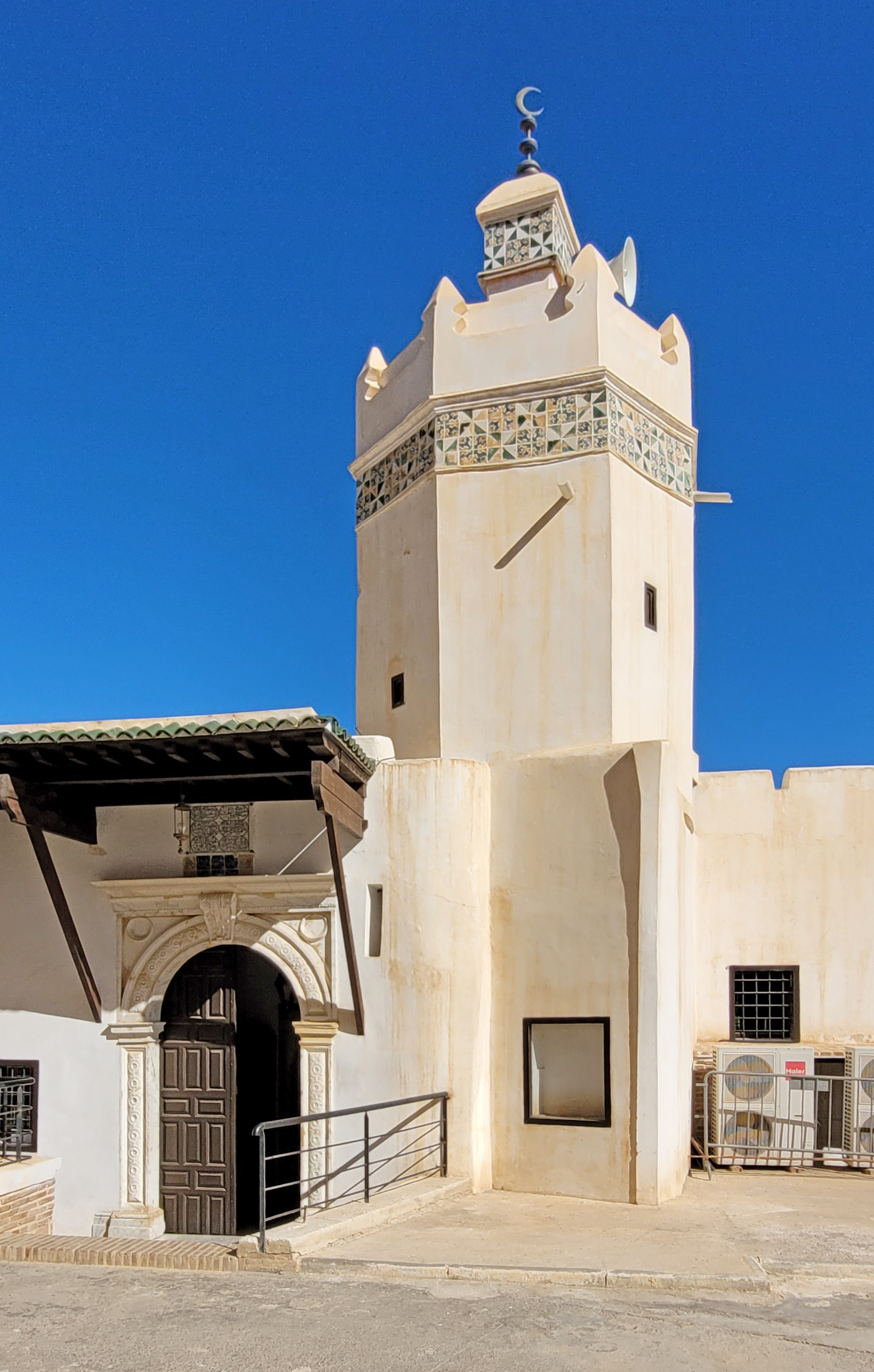

- Location of the mosque in Algiers

Religion
- Affiliation: Islam
- Ecclesiastical or organizational status: Mosque (1653–1830); Profane use (c. 1830); Church (1839–1962); Mosque (since 1962– )
- Status: Active

Location
- Location: Casbah, Algiers
- Country: Algeria
- Interactive map of El Barani Mosque
- Coordinates: 36°47′4.1″N 3°3′20.7″E

Architecture
- Type: Islamic architecture
- Style: Ottoman
- Completed: 1653 CE
- Minaret: 1

UNESCO World Heritage Site
- Part of: Casbah of Algiers
- Criteria: Cultural: (ii), (v)
- Reference: 565
- Inscription: 1992 (16th Session)

The El Berrani Mosque (Arabic: مسجد براني) is a mosque in the city of Algiers, Algeria. The mosque is situated inside the Casbah of Algiers, a UNESCO World Heritage Site, and is located at Bab Jadid Street, aligning with the entrance of Dar al-Sultan palace.

== Etymology ==
The term "Berrani" was used to designate the people from outside of Algiers came for residence and employment.

== History ==
The mosque was built by the Ottomans in 1653 CE nearby their palace in order to provide a prayer place for Berrani people who reside in the area. It was aimed at Berrani people who work outside the palace and were unable to enter the mosque inside the palace for security reasons.

During the French occupation, the mosque was turned into a military barracks and converted into a church in 1839. The French colonial authority designated the mosque as a cultural heritage in 1887. After the independence of Algeria, it was reconsecrated as a mosque.

After a part of the roof collapsed due to winter rainwater eroding the central columns, in 2016 urgent renovations were completed out under the supervision of the Bureau of the Management of Protected Cultural Property. The mosque has degrees of wear in other parts as well, including the foundations and the walls. The mosque was not renovated or restored by any designated institutions, including during the French Colonial era.

Mohamed Charef served as imam from 1908 until 2011.

== See also ==
- Islam in Algeria
- List of mosques in Algeria
