= Dar al-Sultan =

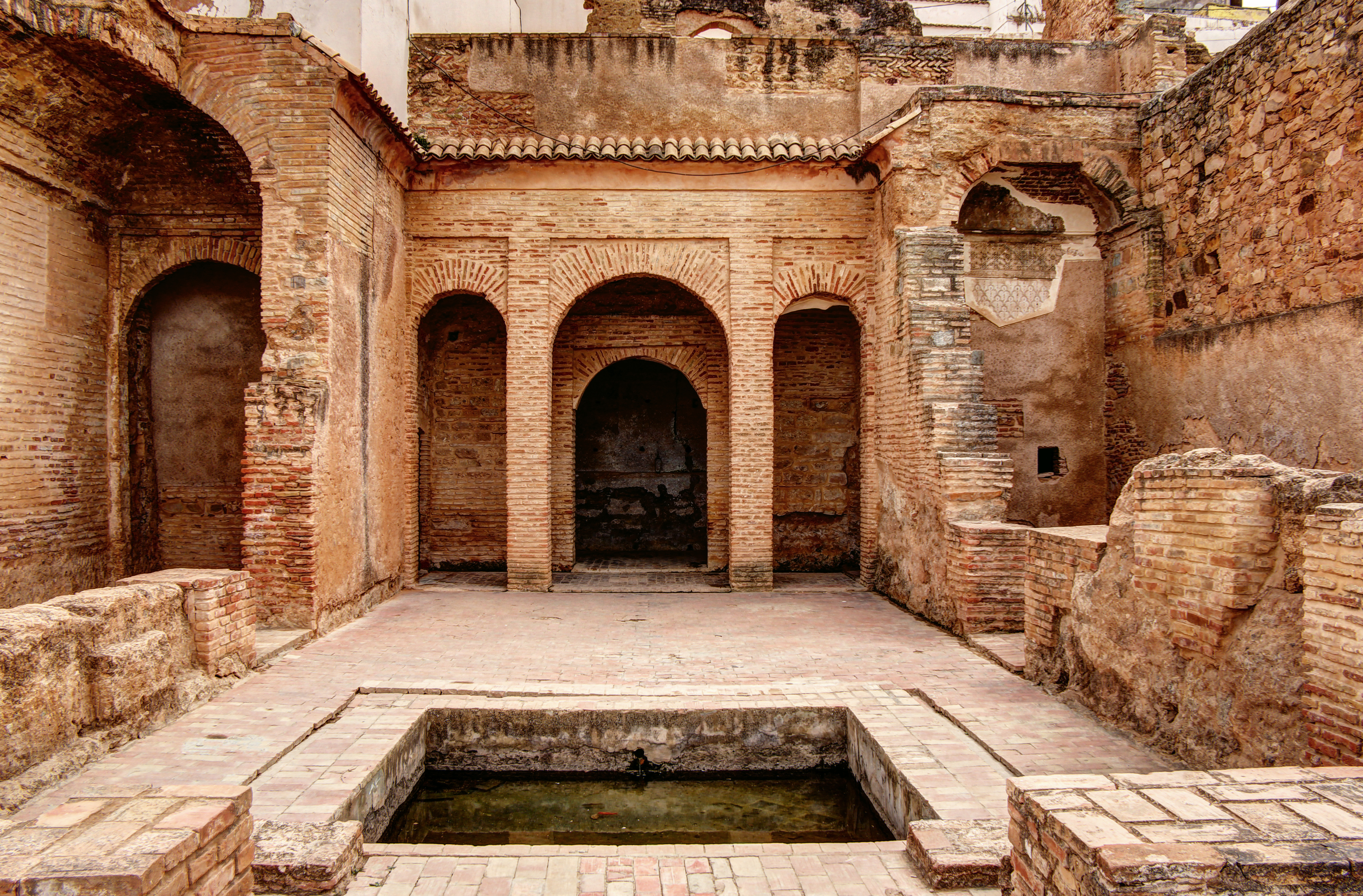
Dar al-Sultan palace

Dar al-Sultan (Arabic: دار السلطان) is a palace dating back to the Marinid dynasty in the village of Ubbad, 2km south of Tlemcen, Algeria. The palace is a part of the greater complex of Sidi Abu Madyan Mosque. The palace is named as "Dar al-Sultan" which means "house of the sultan" as sultans had stayed there during their visit to Ubbad. Construction of the palace was carried out simultaneously with the construction of Sidi Abu Madyan Mosque in 1339. Eight years later, a madrasa was established as well. Although the palace is small, it features patios, arcades, water ways and numerous rooms. The palace was abandoned after the demise of the Marinid dynasty. It is considered a prominent example of the Marinid-era Islamic architecture.

== Bibliography ==
- Marçais, W., and Georges Marçais. Les monuments arabes de Tlemcen. ouvrage publié sous les auspices du Gouvernement général de l'Algérie. Paris: A. Fontemoing, 1903.
