= List of mosques in Algeria =

This is a list of mosques in Algeria. According to Algeria Press Service as of 2020, there were approximately 18,400 mosques in Algeria.

== List ==
Name	Images	Location	Year	Notes
Sidi Okba Mosque		Sidi Okba	686	
Ghardaia Mosque		Ghardaia	10th century	
Sidi Bou Merouane Mosque		Annaba	1033	
Great Mosque of Algiers		Algiers	1097	
Sidi Ramadan Mosque		Algiers	1097	
Great Mosque of Tlemcen		Tlemcen	1136	
Great Mosque of Nedroma		Nedroma	1145	
Sidi Bellahsen Mosque		Tlemcen	1296	Repurposed as an Islamic art museum
Mansourah Mosque		Tlemcen	1302-1303	
El Mechouar Mosque		Tlemcen	1310	
Sidi Boumediene Mosque		Tlemcen	1339	Preserves the tomb of Abu Madyan, an influential Sufi
Sidi El Haloui		Tlemcen	1353	Built by the Marinid Sultan Abou Inane Fares in honor of Abou Abdallah Echoudsy, a qadi of Seville accused of witchcraft and conspiring against the Zayyanid monarch under the Marinid occupation of the city.
Shrine of Sidi Abder Rahman		Algiers	1471	Commemorates Sidi Abder Rahman El Thaelebi, a renowned Islamic scholar
El Kawthar Mosque		Blida	1533	Renovated and expanded in 1981
Safir Mosque		Algiers	1534	
Ketchaoua Mosque		Algiers	1612	
Ali Bitchin Mosque		Algiers	1622	
Al-Qods Mosque		Bouira	1652	
El Barani Mosque		Algiers	1653	
Djama’a al-Djedid		Algiers	1660	
Mausoleum of Sidi M'hamed Bou Qobrine		Algiers	1791	Preserves the tomb of Sidi M'hamed Bou Qobrine, the founder of Rahmaniyya Sufi order and one of the seven Patron Saints of Algiers.
Bey Mohamed el-Kebir Mosque		Oran	1792	
Salah Bey Mosque		Annaba	1791-1792	
Hassan Pasha Mosque		Oran	1796	
Imam al-Houari Mosque		Oran	1792-1799	
Ben Farès Mosque		Algiers	1865	Built as a synagogue in 1865; converted to a mosque in 1962.
Al-Rahma Mosque, Algiers		Algiers	1897	
El Rahman Mosque		Cherchell	19th century	Built in the 19th century as a church; converted to a mosque in 1964.
Sidi Khaled Mosque		Sidi Khaled, Biskra	1912	The current structure is a 1917 reconstruction. It is believed to contain the tomb of the pre-Islamic figure, Khalid bin Sinan, who is cited in local traditions as having moved to Algeria. It is currently in a state of disrepair but is still a popular spot for visits from locals.
Abdellah Ben Salem Mosque		Oran	1918	
Al-Umma Mosque		Algiers	1951	
Emir Abdelkader Mosque		Constantine	1994	
1st November of 1954 Great Mosque		Batna	2003	
20th August of 1956 Mosque		Ouzellaguen	2011	
Al-Aman Mosque		Souk Ahras	2011	
Abdelhamid Ben Badis Mosque		Oran	2015	
Jemma Al Djazair		Algiers	2019	Houses the world's tallest minaret that is 265 metres (869 ft) high and is the third-largest mosque in the world, capable of accommodating 120,000 worshippers.
Sidi Ghanim Mosque		Mila		

== See also ==
- Islam in Algeria
- Zawiyas in Algeria
