= Dzair Media City =

Media free zone in Algeria

Dzair Media City (DMC)
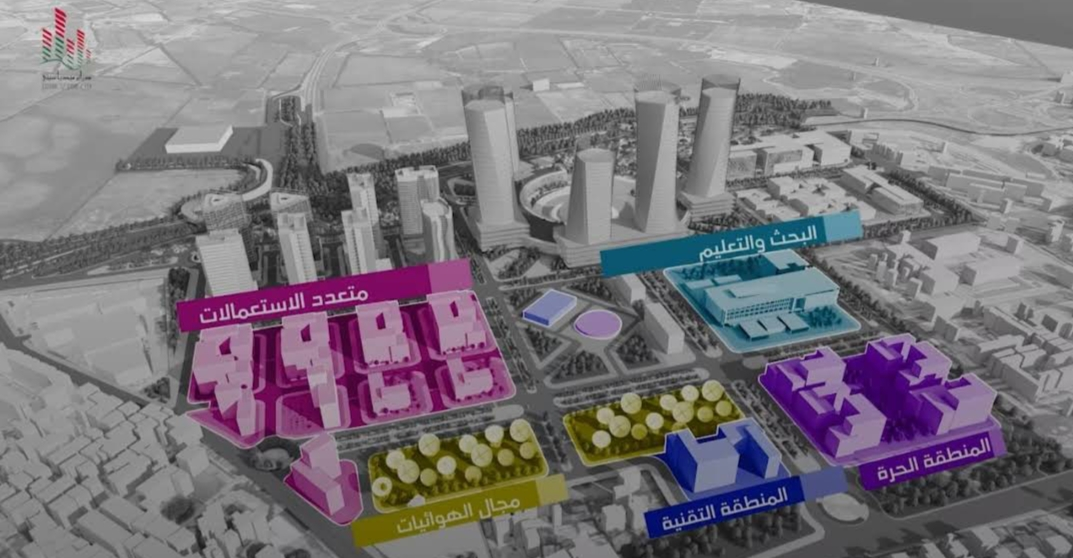
- Native name: مدينة الجزائر الإعلامية
- Type: Private
- Industry: Entertainment
- Founder: Ministry of Housing, Urban Planning and the City
- Owner: Algeria

Dzair Media City (DMC) is a media free zone located in Ouled Fayet, Algeria. It was established by the Algerian government to promote the development of the country's media and entertainment industry.
