= Al-Aman Mosque =

Mosque in Souk Ahras, Algeria

- مسجد الأمان
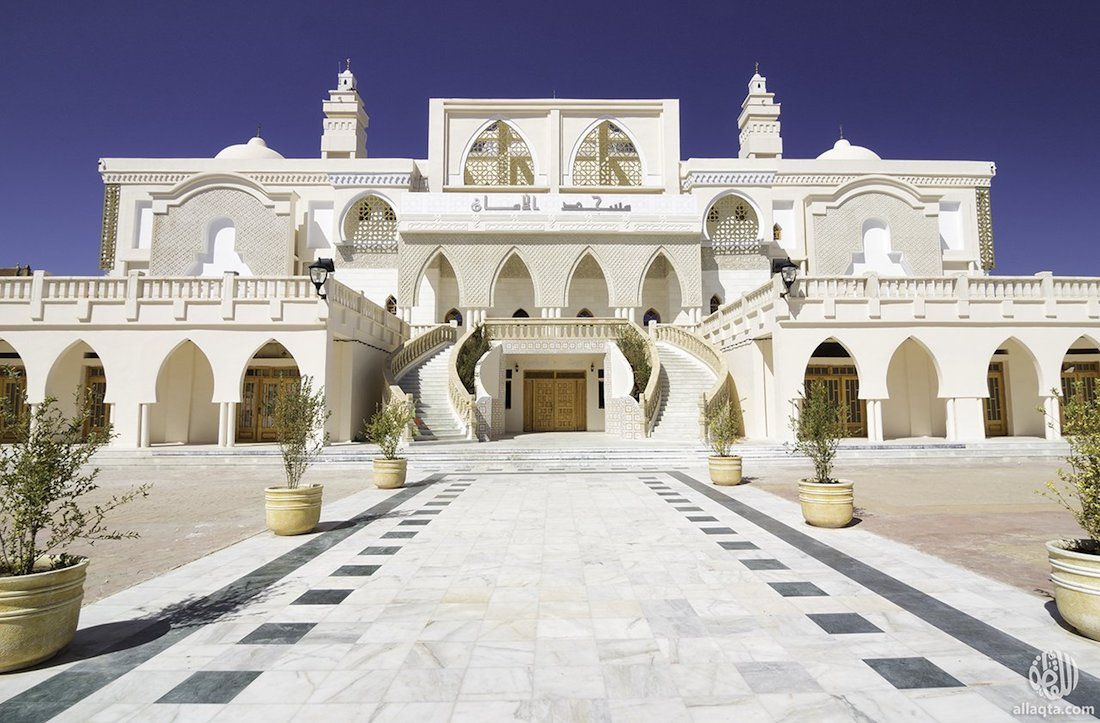
- 36.2855°N 7.9544°E

Religion
- Affiliation: Islam
- Year consecrated: 2011
- Status: Active

Location
- Location: Souk Ahras
- Country: Algeria
- Interactive map of Al-Aman Mosque

Architecture
- Style: Islamic Architecture
- Construction cost: 885 million Algerian Dinars

Specifications
- Capacity: 4,400 worshippers
- Dome: 1
- Dome height (outer): 65 meters
- Minaret: 2
- Minaret height: 107 meters

Al-Aman Mosque is located in Souk Ahras, Algeria, in the city center. It covers an area of 5,688 square meters and can accommodate 4,400 worshippers. It includes a library with 200 seats, a parking lot, and a Quranic school. Construction of this religious edifice with its striking aesthetic architecture began in early February 2011 with a program license of 885 million Algerian dinars, and was handed over in 2016.
