= Abdelhamid Ben Badis Mosque =

Mosque in Oran City, Oran Province, Algeria

- مسجد عبد الحميد بن باديس
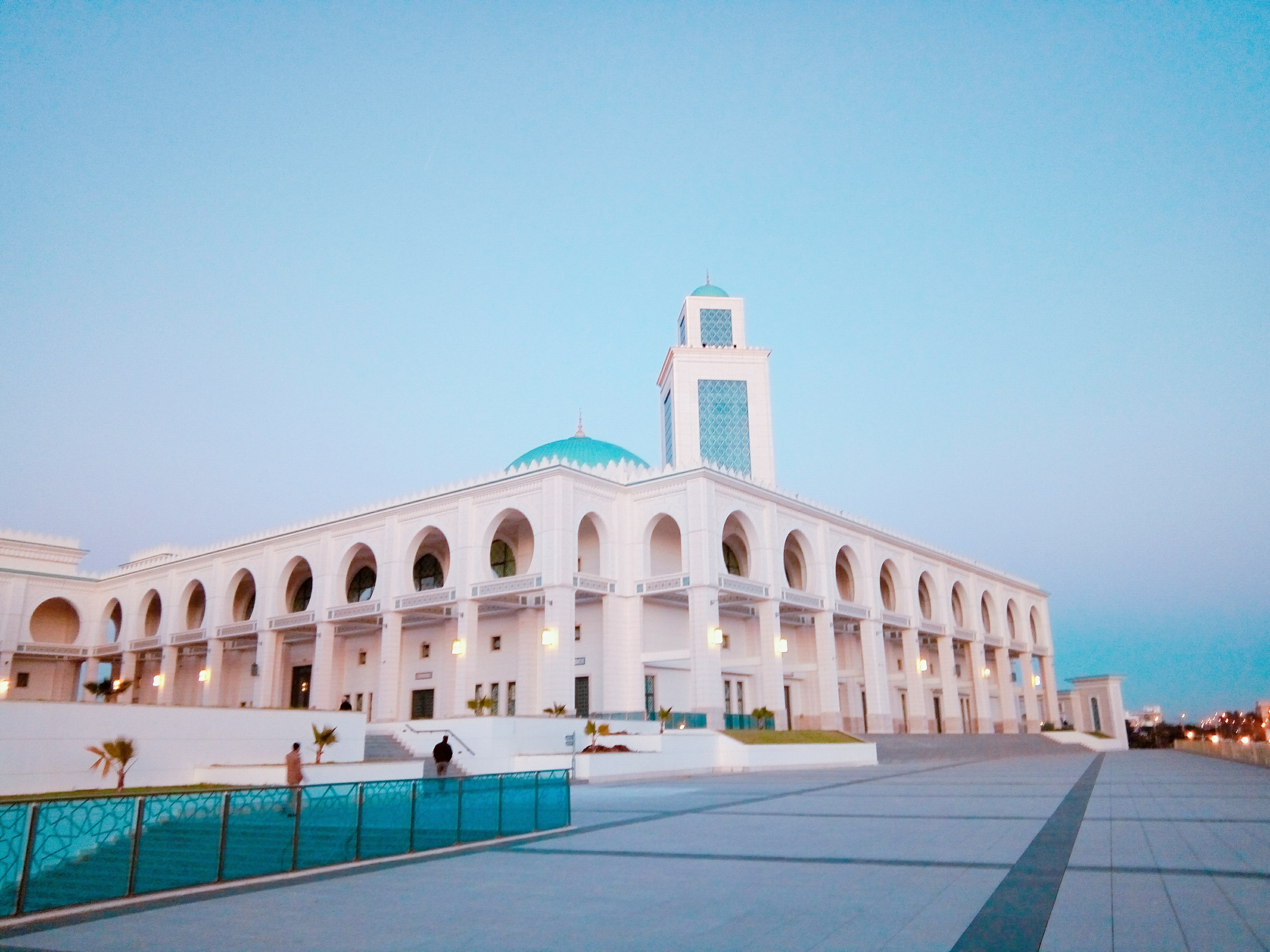
- The mosque in 2018

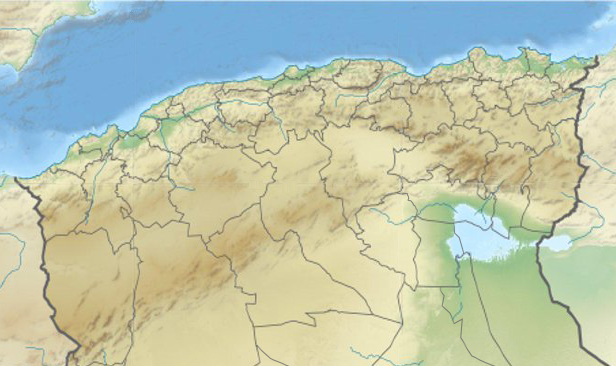
- Location of the mosque in northern Algeria

Religion
- Affiliation: Sunni Islam
- Ecclesiastical or organisational status: Mosque
- Status: Active

Location
- Location: Oran
- Country: Algeria
- Interactive map of Abdelhamid Ben Badis Mosque
- Coordinates: 35°41′49″N 0°37′59″W

Architecture
- Type: Islamic architecture
- Completed: 2015
- Construction cost: 8.5 billion dinars

Specifications
- Capacity: 25,000 worshipers
- Dome: 1
- Minaret: 1

The Abdelhamid Ben Badis Mosque (Arabic: مسجد عبد الحميد بن باديس) is a Sunni mosque located in Oran, Algeria. The mosque was completed in 2015 and named in honor of Abdelhamid Ben Badis, a revered figure among Algerian Muslims. In 1931, Ben Badis helped found the Association of Algerian Muslim Ulema, an Islamic reformist organization that helped combat assimilation into colonial French culture.

== History ==
Plans for construction of the mosque began in 1975. However, over 25 years, the site for the planned mosque moved four times. Construction began in 2000. The construction process was marred with allegations of corruption, with construction stopping twice due to budget overruns. Three different companies were responsible for the construction during that time; an Algerian company, a Chinese company and later a Turkish company would complete the project. At its completion, the project cost an estimated 8.5 billion Algerian dinars, well over the allocated budget of 5 billion dinars.

Since its opening, the mosque has become a meeting place for high-level figures. The Minister of Religious Affairs and Waqf, Mohammed Aissa, spoke at the mosque in 2018 about promoting peace and tolerance within Islam. When Papal envoy Cardinal Giovanni Angelo Becciu visited Algeria for the beatification of the Martyrs of Algeria and the reopening of the Chapel at Fort Santa Cruz, he met with Minister Aissa and Sheikh Mohamed Bendjaber, the Imam of the mosque.

== See also ==
- Islam in Algeria
- List of mosques in Algeria
