= List of tallest structures in Algeria =

An incomplete list of the tallest structures in Algeria. l

| Structure | Year built | Structural type | Region | Pinnacle height (m) | Pinnacle height (ft) | Remarks |
|---|---|---|---|---|---|---|
| Kenadsa longwave transmitter | ? | Guyed mast | Kenadsa | 357 m | 1171 ft | 3 masts |
| Tipaza Longwave Transmitter | ? | Guyed mast | Tipaza | 355 m | 1164 ft | |
| Ain Beida Transmitter | ? | Guyed mast | F'kirina | 278 m | 912 ft | insulated against ground |
| Sidi Hamadouche Transmitter, Main Mast | ? | Guyed mast | Sidi Hamadouche (Les Trembles) | 270 m | 886 ft | insulated against ground |
| Djamaa el Djazaïr | 2019 | Building | Algiers | 265 m | 869 ft | Second tallest building in Africa |
| Ouled Fayet Transmitter, Main Mast | ? | Guyed mast | Ouled Fayet | 158 m | 518 ft | insulated against ground |
| Chréa Transmitter | ? | Tower | Chréa (Pic Abdelkader) | 150 m | 492 ft | |
| Tessala Transmitter | ? | Tower | Tessala | 100 m | 328 ft | |
| Ain N'sour Transmitter | ? | Tower | Bou Kadir | 100 m | 328 ft | |
| Grande Kabylie Transmitter | ? | Tower | Akfadou | 100 m | 328 ft | |
| Djebel Meghriss Transmitter | ? | Tower | Setif | 100 m | 328 ft | |
| Djebel Ouash Transmitter | ? | Tower | Kef El Akhal | 100 m | 328 ft | |
| Djebel M'cid Transmitter | ? | Tower | Souk Ahras | 100 m | 328 ft | |
| Abalessa Transmitter | ? | Guyed Mast | Abalessa | 100 m | 328 ft | |
