= Architecture of Fiji =

The architecture of Fiji has its own unique style and pattern. While Fiji is a famous travelling destination among tourists for its beaches and beauty, its architecture is unique and particularly attractive. Fiji is a pacific island belonging to the scope of tropical marine climate, whose capital and the country's largest city is Suva. As a coastal city, the main architectural style of the urban centre, Suva has a foreign classical beauty, antique as if back to a few centuries ago. It often reflects the socio-cultural heritage of the locale and the country. However, with the development in the society of Fiji and the spread of globalization, the architectural scenario has incorporated several foreign styles without affecting the original style and yet enhancing the aesthetic value. The richness of Fiji's architecture can be comprehended from diverse styles of architectural designs for different kinds of buildings. Moreover, the architecture of the country changes with region to region and has varied influences. Additionally, it is notable that the architecture of this country can provide insights to the architects around the world regarding the aesthetically appealing patterns and scientifically viable designs which would enhance the significance of the built environments.

== Local architectural style ==
The local and original architectural style of Fiji is unique in its own and the designs of different kinds of buildings vary according to their purpose and aesthetic significance. Accordingly, diverse urban architectural styles or designs can be observed in resort hotel/villa, residential buildings, and office buildings.

=== Resorts ===
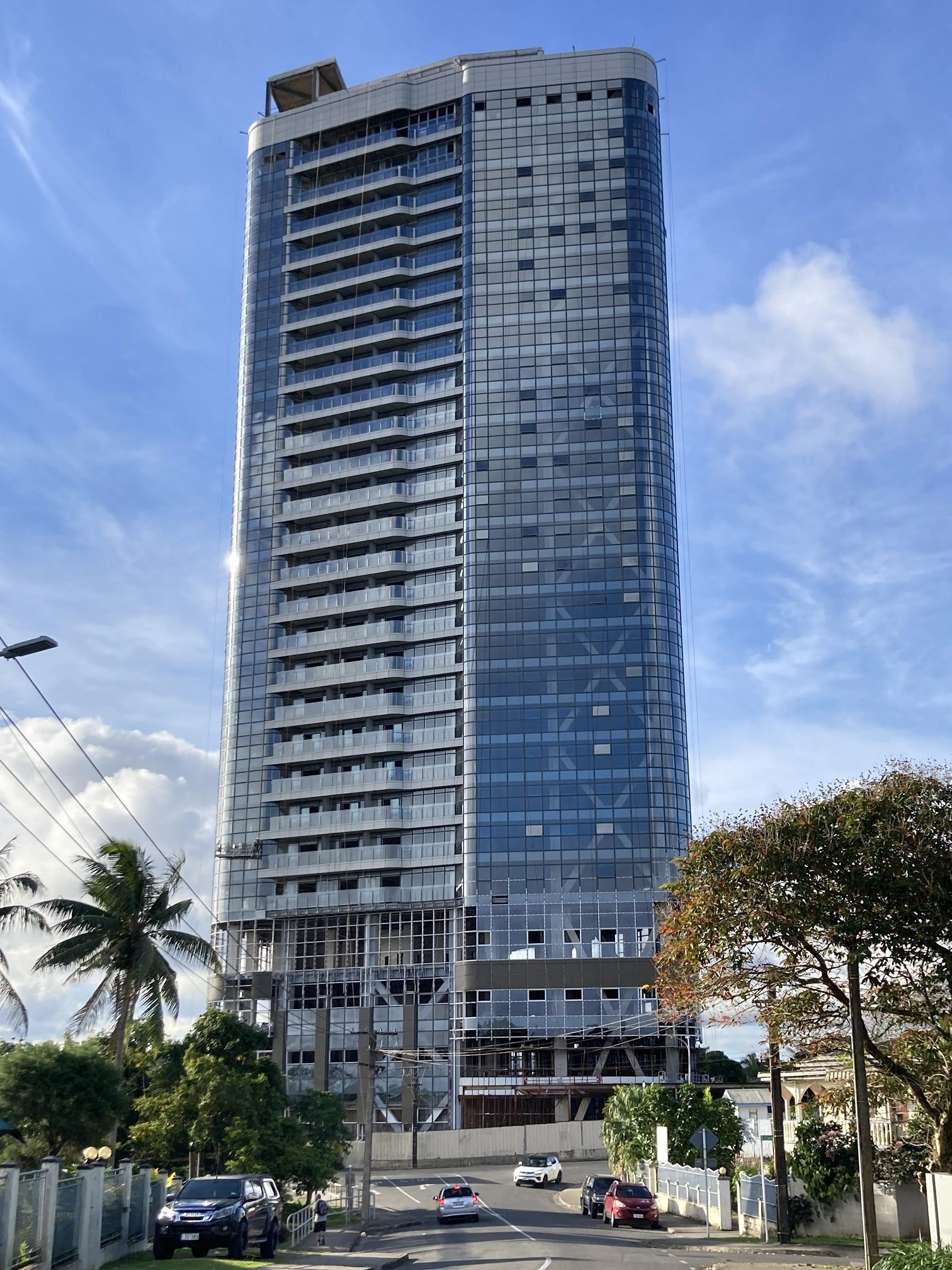
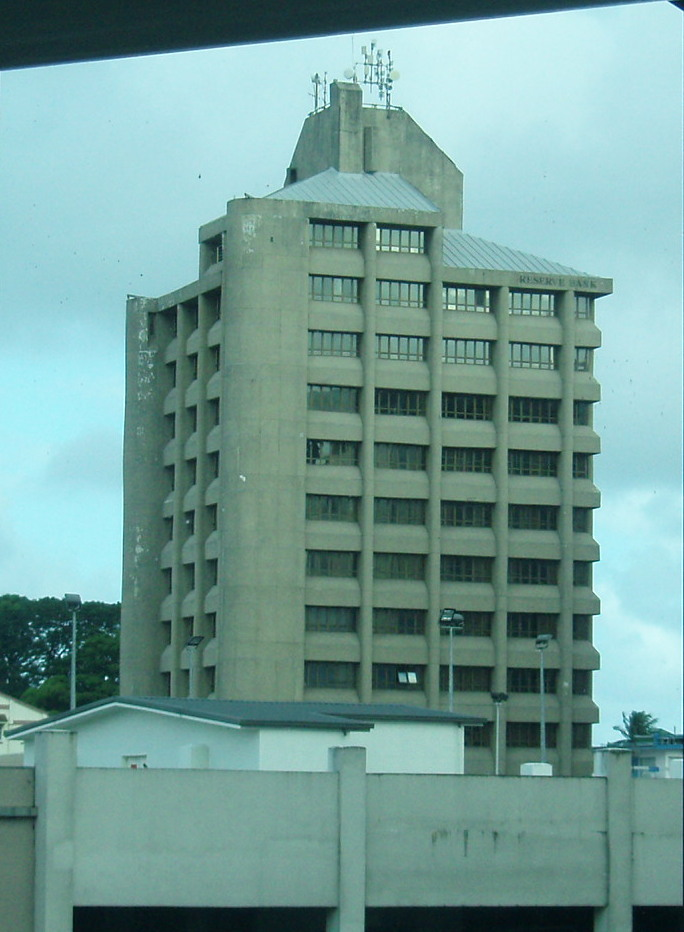
WG Friendship Plaza (left) and Reserve Bank of Fiji Headquarters (right)

The resort hotels and villas in Fiji has their own unique architectural patterns. They are not only beautifully designed and scientifically constructed but they also promote ecologically sustainable development through their designs which include materials that have ecological viability such as reed and palm wood to create a healthy and comfortable environment. Moreover, the resorts and the villas on the islands have tried to amalgamate the local Fijian architectural styles in order to maintain authenticity and present to the tourists what their country and heritage is about. Additionally, the use of local raw materials in their architecture is also notable. For example, located on the Taveuni Levu island, the villa on the Vacala Bay Resort has been constructed mainly through the use of locally available raw materials. Furthermore, the design of the villas also has immense significance in terms of providing heightened aesthetic emotions through experience. For instance, the villa has three separate buildings that provide diverse viewpoints to look at the natural scenario surrounding the villa. At the same time, it also ensures utmost privacy for the visitors. Another example is the Likuliku Resort situated on the Malolo Island, Fiji. The resort is constructed near the tropical forest near the sea and looks like a Fijian village, the architecture of the resort includes elements from both rural Fiji village architecture such as palm roofs and wooden platforms as well as modern architecture. Furthermore, in order to provide an aesthetically satisfying experience to those who visit Fiji to encounter its unique culture, several resort hotels utilize the layout of villages and the materials traditionally used in them. Thus, the resort hotels/villas in Fiji promote the culture and heritage of the country through their architecture.

=== Residential buildings ===
The architectural design patterns of the residential buildings in Fiji is different from that of the resort hotels/villas. In numerous areas, people still use the village layout designs where the use of reed and palm wood that reflects on the culture and ensure ecological sustainability. Also, the use of reed in protecting the residential buildings in the cases of fire. While the urban space is being infiltrated by the brick and cement culture, many regions of the country still have traditional houses called bure/vale. Bure means men's temple or house, today it refers to more traditional residential houses. Bures are built of palm and wood are usually have a thatched floor or matted woven flooring. The traditional bure has no window and is quite dark, the only entrance is through a long-side door. In the contemporary times, bures have adapted according to change, while the traditional Bures lacked windows, has a single door or water and electricity, the Bure today is well equipped with modern facilities, doors and windows. Furthermore, the architectural patterns or styles of the residential buildings also depend on the geographical feature and natural environment surrounding the area as well as their economic impacts. For example, people living near the Taveuni volcano build low-rise buildings so that higher economic damage can be avoided in case the buildings are affected by volcanic eruption. In these ways, the architectural pattern of residential buildings in Fiji depend on numerous factors including cultural, geographic, environmental, and economic aspects.

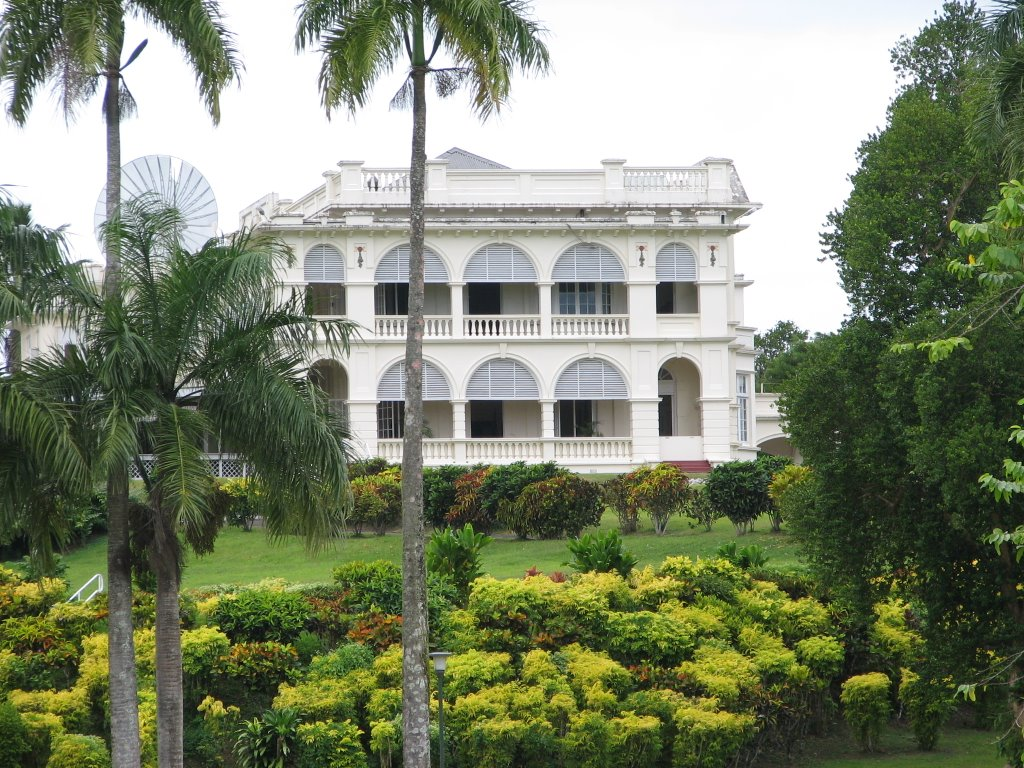
The Government House in Suva

=== Office buildings ===
The architectural patterns of the office buildings in Fiji also demonstrate unique styles which are distinct from the resort hotels and residential buildings. These buildings mainly follow the architectural style introduced by the British during the colonial period with a mix of the local architectural patterns that have its own cultural significance. One pertinent example of such architecture is the Government House, which is an official building constructed for the government; the architectural style of this building reflects a mix of western and non-western architectural patterns to create unique styles. Several other official buildings too follow this pattern and demonstrate a distinct architectural style.

== Impacts of colonial culture ==
Since Fiji has been ruled for several years by the colonial powers of Britain, the architectural culture and scenario of Fiji have eventually been affected by the colonial culture and styles. Accordingly, the British introduced their own western architectural styles and patterns to Fiji which amalgamated with Fiji's unique architectural styles to create a sort of unique fusion.

With the advent of the colonial powers in the island, the architecture of Fiji has gone through a significant change, although it has been limited to some particular areas. During the British era, the effects of the western architecture were only seen in the growing centres of the country and gradually urbanised these areas like Suva and Levuka. In the contemporary times, there exists numerous building that are built in British architectural style or the Victorian style. These structures are visible in growing Fiji cities in the form of Churches, houses and offices, mostly in the areas of Suva. For example, the Borron House, Veivueti House (Draiba), Cable and Wireless Office, Victoria Parade, Suva City Library, Victoria Parade and Nasova House, Levuka. Moreover, many of the colonial building that remain in Suva that are still being used today are turned into heritage sites. Buildings like the Vineyard, that used to be the old Town Hall and the FINTEL building that once housed the Pacific Cable and Wireless Office, are archaeologically important and have been conserved and protected under various Acts and Regulations

While on one hand colonialization brought in the Western influences on the architecture, on-the other hand it also brought people from other nations in the form of plantation labourers like the Indians. The Indians brought with them a new style of architecture to the country, most particularly in the form of Hindu temples and Islamic Mosques. These spiritual and religious structures are usually established in areas dominated by the Indian diaspora, chiefly in the urban regions of the island.

The impact of the colonial culture in Fiji can be observed from the architectural patterns in numerous office buildings including the Nasova House. The Nasova House or the Governors vale levu is the best example of the impact of colonial culture on architecture, it is the hybridization of the colonial ideologies and the native culture. Still now, the colonial architectural patterns are used and implemented in designing diverse sorts of buildings.

== Architectural schools ==
=== Local style ===
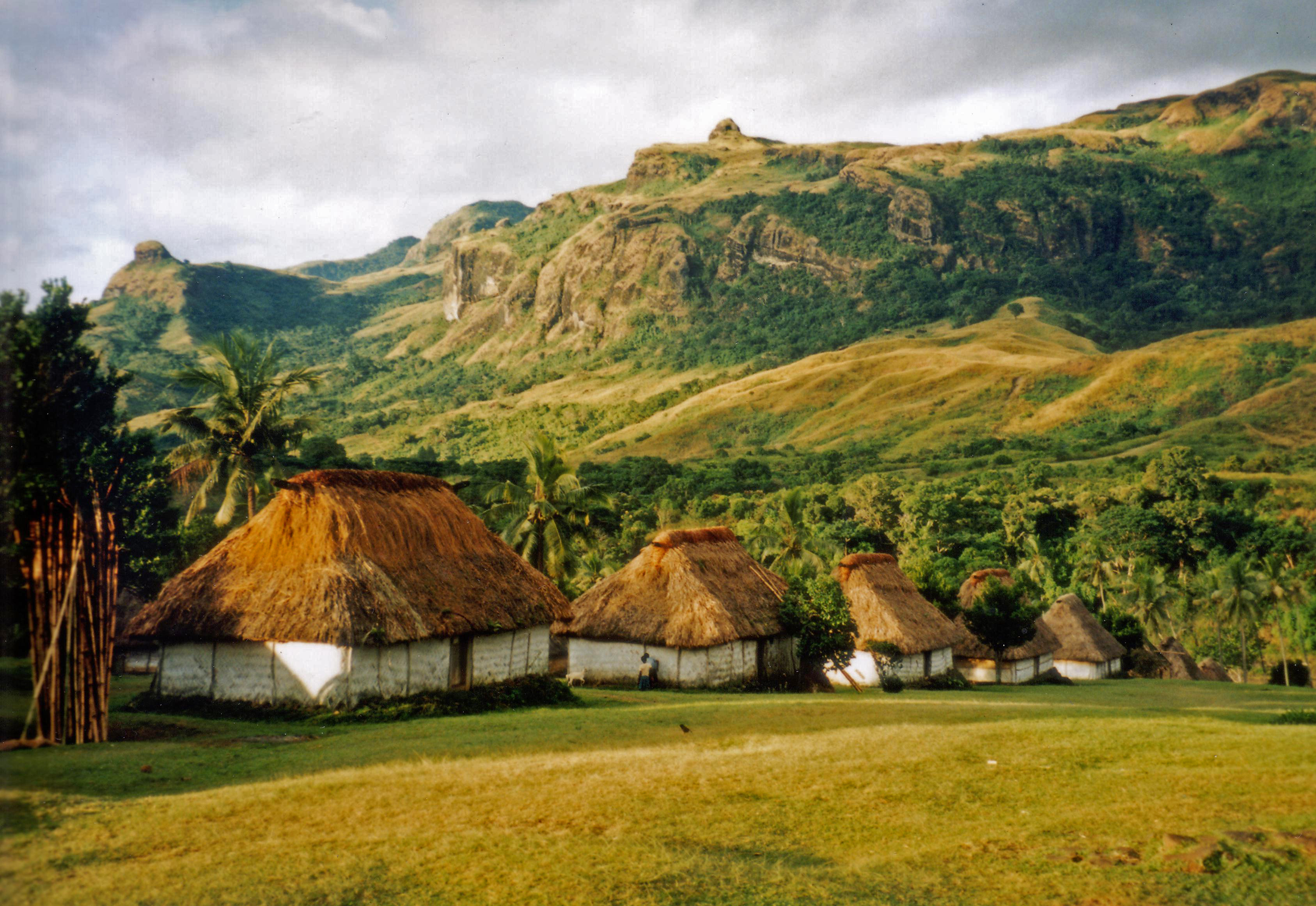
Several bure (one-room Fijian houses) in the village of Navala in the Nausori Highlands

The local style of the architecture in Fiji is reflected in the materials used in them and the design of the layouts. The use of palm wood, reed wood, and the village layout patterns contribute to the distinct urban architectural style of Fiji. While the rural community of the country is highly hierarchical, the local style architecture is also based on hierarchy. Houses are called bure or vale; these vales are rectangular cabins made of wood and dried palm leaves and have no windows and only one door. The length and size of the door also depends on the class and level of the man in the society, who owns the house. The local architecture is usually constructed with communal collectives and the knowledge and training of this architectural style is passed down from one generation to another. Moreover, the local style is changing with coming of modernisation and the influence of Christianity in the region. Additionally, due to the impact by the colonial powers and the emergence of globalisation, the local style has been mixed with foreign styles.

=== Foreign style ===
Architectural style in Fiji has been influenced by foreign or western styles since the nineteenth century, mainly due to the colonial era. The rise of globalisation and the amalgamation of different cultural values both from western and non-western lands enhanced the architecture. The Laucala Island which was brought by Australian Plantation company in the eighteenth century and later bought by New Yorker Malcolm Forbes in 1972, is an excellent example of the foreign architecture that came into existence on the island. The Forbes house built on the island of Laucala is an idyllic British cottage. Moreover, the house has high beam ceilings and glass windows. However, the interiors of the house are inspired by Fijian art and aesthetics. Additionally, the Forbes estate is built in a style that captures the western and the Fijian culture and architecture in true beauty, with thatched roof of beach shacks looking towards the ocean and in house pool to facilitate relaxation.

In the current period, the architecture of Fiji utilizes modern technology, tools, and materials to enhance the aesthetic effectiveness of the built environments. The design of the Kokomo Private Island in Fiji is a perfect example of such amalgamation. The foreign influence is more visible in the urban landscapes as compared with the rural areas.

== Implications in the world ==
The architecture in Fiji is a potent example of the perfect balance between local styles and foreign styles. The knowledge about such patterns and insights into Fiji's architectural scenario would help the architects to use such complex fusion to enhance the aesthetic viability of built environments. Furthermore, the way Fiji utilizes modern designs and techniques without compromising its native cultural values is also a lesson for the architects to develop technically enhanced architectural designs which are, at the same time, culturally valuable and attractive. However, scholars like Mitsuko, Noriko and Masamitsu have associated the culture of Fiji to incorporate the traditional architecture with western ideas as an influence of Japan.
