= Jade Park =

Skyscraper in Asunción, Paraguay

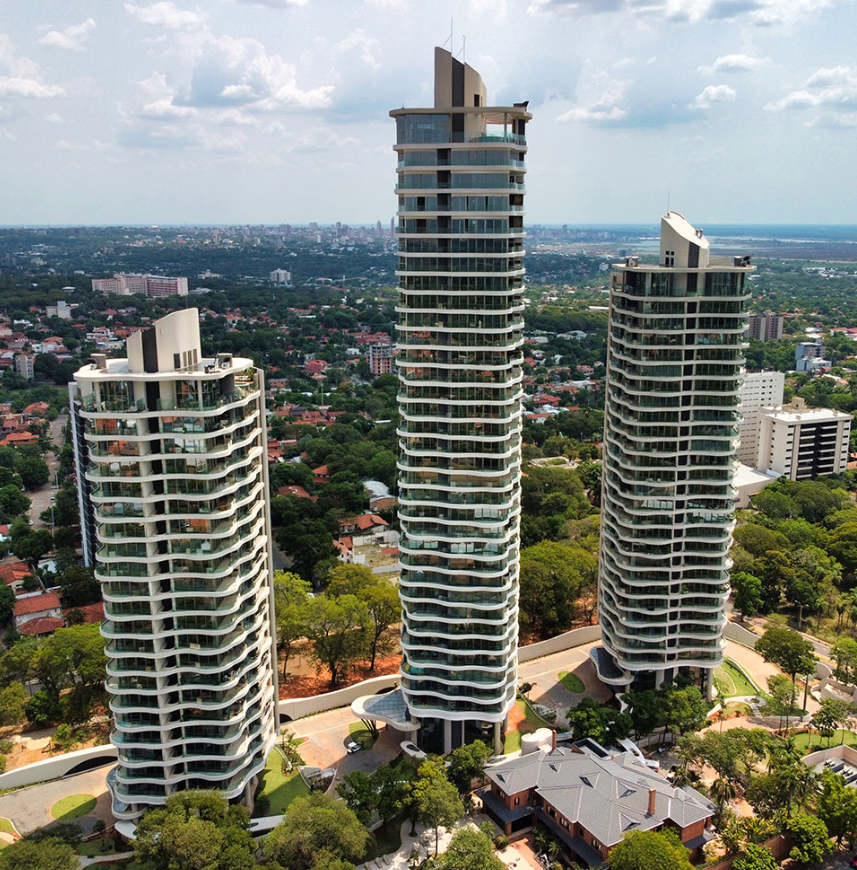
- From left to right: Towers Trébol, Lapacho and Jacarandá
- Interactive map of the Jade Park area

General information
- Status: Completed
- Type: Residential
- Location: Asunción, Paraguay, Congreso de Colombia del 70, Asunción, Paraguay
- Coordinates: 25.26373°S 57.57121°W
- Construction started: 2016
- Completed: 2022
- Cost: $ 100 Million

Height
- Roof: 135 m (443 ft) (Tower Lapacho); 110 m (360 ft) (Tower Jacarandá); 110 m (360 ft) (Tower Trébol)

Technical details
- Structural system: Concrete
- Floor count: 35 (Tower Lapacho); 27 (Tower Jacarandá); 22 (Tower Trébol)
- Floor area: 18,000 m^{2} (194,000 sq ft) (entire complex)

Design and construction
- Architect: Carlos Ott
- Structural engineer: Jiménez Gaona & Lima

Website
- Jade Park

Jade Park is a residential skyscraper complex in Asunción, Paraguay. Built between 2016 and 2022, the complex consists of three towers standing at 135 m (443 ft) with 35 floors (Tower Lapacho), 110 m (360 ft) (Tower Jacarandá) with 27 floors, respectively 110 m (360 ft) with 22 floors (Tower Trébol). Tower Lapacho is the current third tallest building in Paraguay.

== History ==
The building complex is located on the Santísima Trinidad Avenue in the homonymous neighborhood of the city of Asunción. Adjacent to Pavetti Park, the three residential buildings house a total of 122 rentable apartment units with two, three and four bedrooms, a clubhouse, and semi-floors.

Upon the completion of the project, the Lapacho Tower became the second tallest in the city and the country after the Icono Tower. Each of the three towers has a double and triple height lobby, as well as mezzanines with divisible meeting areas, plus 5 penthouses with their respective terraces, which include private pools.

On November 1, 2016, Fortune International Group manager Santiago Steed, chief architect Carlos Ott, and Jiménez Gaona & Lima Director Ramón Jiménez Gaona participated at the groundbreaking ceremony of the project which total approximate cost raised up to $100,000,000.

=== Architecture ===
In homage to the country's flora, each tower is named after traditional and emblematic trees such as Lapacho, Jacaranda and Clover. Another feature is that it will have 500 parking spaces and storage rooms for residents. Each tower presents a distinctive type of apartment floor plan, displaying only one or two units per floor.

- Torre Trébol: 2 apartments per floor (semi-floors) with 2 bedrooms each, 40 apartments on 22 floors, 20 floors of apartments + 2 floors of lobby (double-height lobby with mezzanine).
- Jacarandá Tower: 2 apartments per floor (semi-floors) with 3 bedrooms each, 45 apartments on 27 floors, 25 floors of apartments + 2 floors of lobby (double-height lobby with mezzanine).
- Lapacho Tower: 1 apartment per floor, with 4 bedrooms, 32 apartments on 35 floors, 32 floors of apartments + 3 floors of lobby (triple-height lobby with mezzanine).

== See also ==
- List of tallest buildings in Paraguay
- List of tallest buildings in South America
