= Petra Tower =

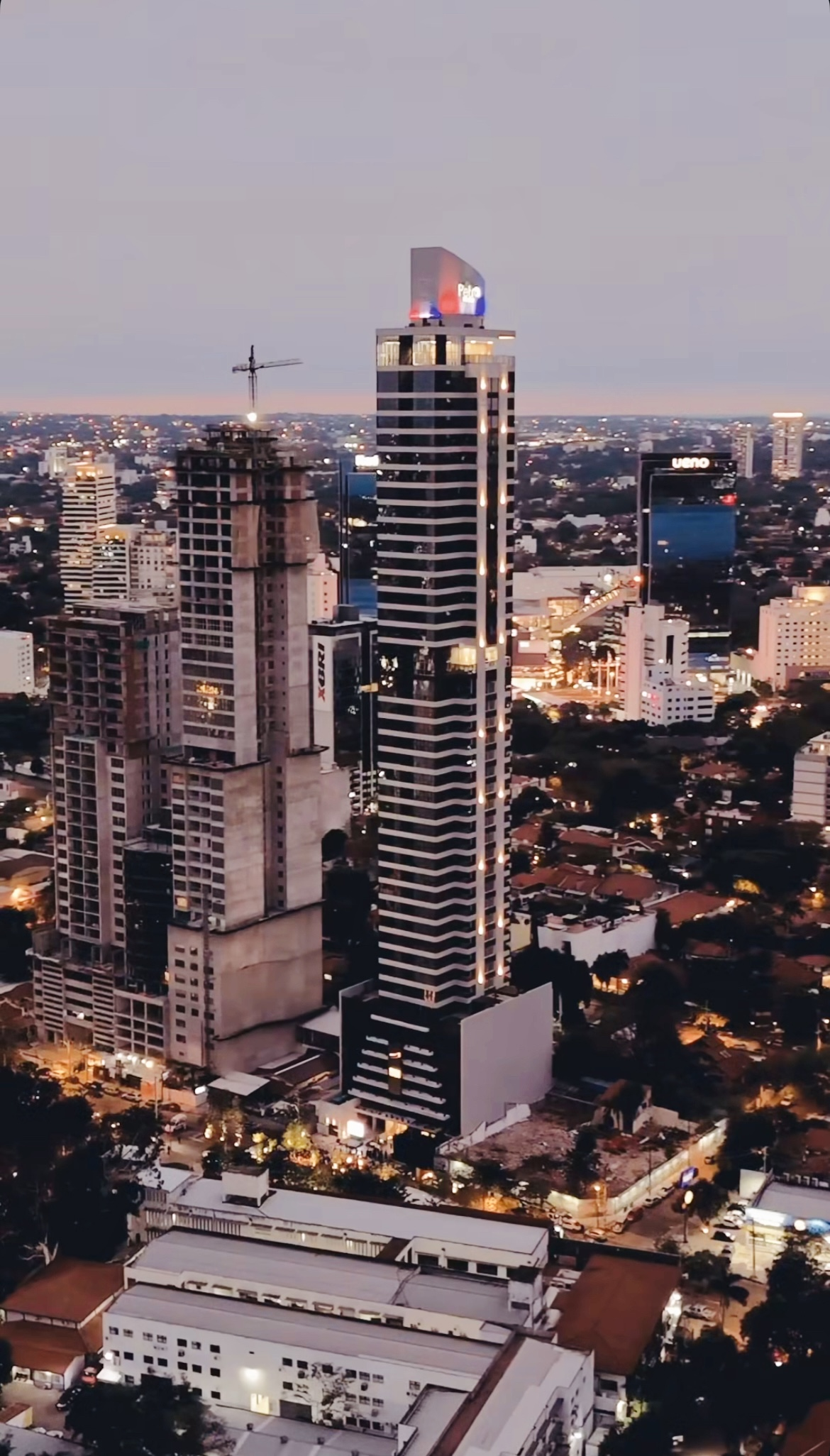

General information
- Type: Residential
- Location: Molas López Avenida, Asunción, Paraguay
- Coordinates: 25.27895°S 57.56220°W
- Construction started: 2021
- Completed: 2025

Height
- Roof: 172 m (564 ft)

Technical details
- Floor count: 44

Design and construction
- Architect: Santiago Benítez Vieira
- Developer: Petra Urbana
- Main contractor: Benitez Bittar Constructora

Website
- Petra Tower

Petra Tower is a residential skyscraper in the Las Lomas district of Asunción, Paraguay. Built between 2021 and 2025, the tower stands at 172 m (564 ft) tall with 44 floors and is the current tallest building in Paraguay.

== History ==
Designed by Paraguayan engineer Santiago Benítez Vieira, the building is located in the new economic district of Asunción and has a total of 200 loft-type apartment units with penthouses, terraces and ground-level commercial spaces.

The building's construction site lays on the Molas López Avenue near the Juan XXIII Street. The project's main partner was the Cecom company who acted as a strategic construction ally. The deadline of the project was 40 months from the groundbreaking as the tower was architecturally topped out at the beginning of 2025. The cost of the project rose to $ 18 million and was designed as a hub for spacious areas accessible to the local market and also aiming to feature a 360 degree view of the city.

According to Carlos Guasti, the president of the developer company Petra Urbana, the building is part of a larger estate project initiated by the latter, which also included towers Petra Icon (39 floors) and Forvm Molas (29 floors).

== Gallery ==
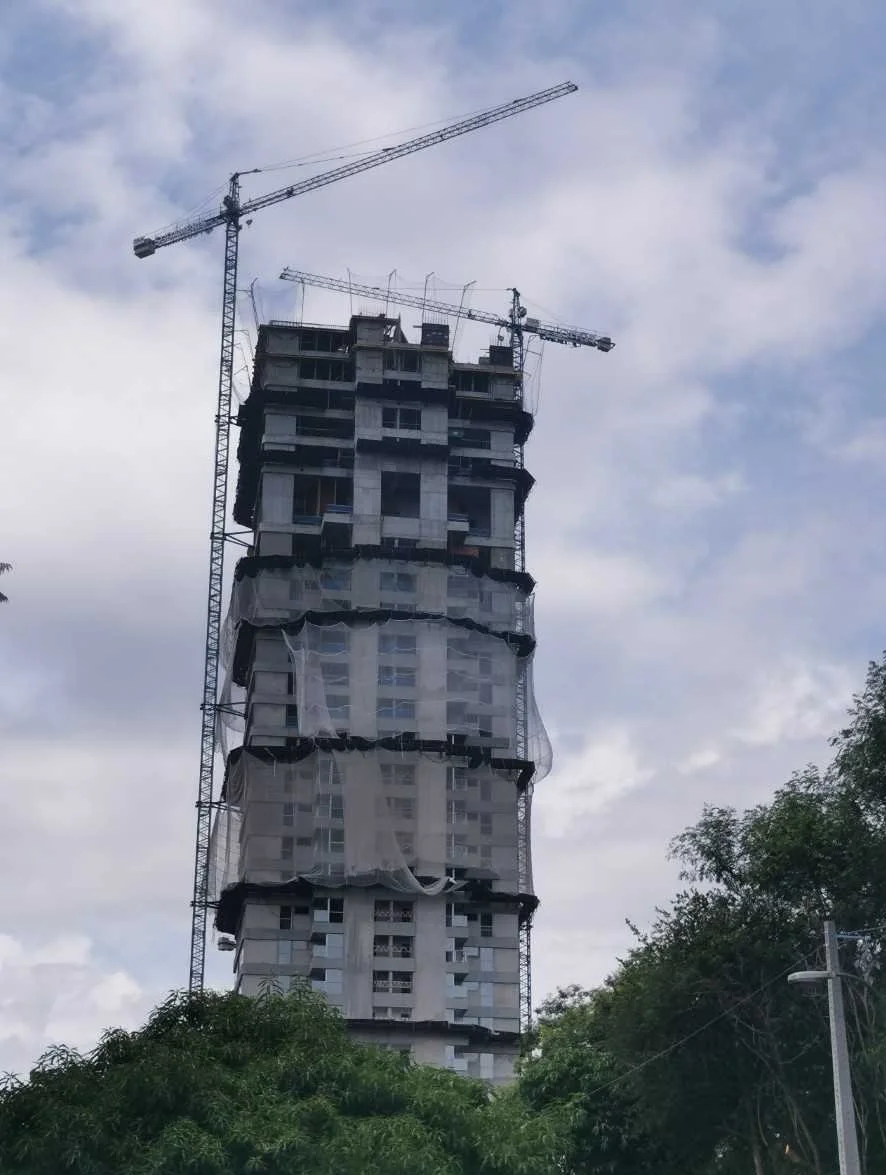
The tower under construction in April 2024

== See also ==
- List of tallest buildings in Paraguay
- List of tallest buildings in South America
- List of tallest buildings by country

Records
| Preceded by Icono Tower | Tallest building in Paraguay; 2025–present 172 metres (564 ft) | Succeeded by Incumbent |
