= Sebastián Salvat =

Argentine rugby union player

- Born: Sebastián Salvat; April 5, 1967 (age 59) Buenos Aires, Argentina
- Height: 1.81 m (5 ft 11 in)
- Weight: 85 kg (187 lb)
- Occupation(s): VP of Development / Head of Design - Fortune International Group, Miami

Rugby union career
- Position(s): Fullback, centre
Senior career
Years	Team	Apps	(Points)
1986-2001	Alumni		
International career
Years	Team	Apps	(Points)
1987-1995	Argentina	37	(58)

Sebastián Salvat (born 5 April 1967) is an Argentine retired rugby union player. He played as a fullback and as a centre.

== Biography ==
Salvat was an emblematic player for Asociación Alumni during his career, from 1986 to 2001. With the first team, they won the Championship of Buenos Aires four consecutive years, from 1999 through 2003.

He was South American Champion first as a junior player with Pumitas in 1986, and later on his career with Pumas in 1991, 1993 and 1995.

He had 37 caps for Argentina, from 1987 to 1995, scoring 12 tries, 58 points in aggregate. The player first game was at the 38–3 win over Uruguay, at 3 May 1987, in Montevideo, for the South American Rugby Championship. He was the captain in his ultimate 13 caps.

Salvat was called for the 1987 Rugby World Cup, playing two games, in a competition where the "Pumas" were eliminated in the 1st round, winning only their game against Italy. He missed the 1991 Rugby World Cup, but returned for the 1995 Rugby World Cup, as the captain. He played in all the three games, but Argentina once again couldn't make it to the quarterfinals. Salvat played for the last time for the "Pumas" at the 12–47 loss to France, at 21 October 1995, in Buenos Aires, for the Latin Cup, aged only 28 years old.

The most relevant test-matches played along his 10 years of international career were against the All Blacks (1999), the Springboks (1993–1994), Australia (1995), England (1991–1995) and France (1988, 1992 and 1995).

In 1996 he was invited to play for the British Barbarians along other international players, Agustin Pichot (Argentina), Denis Charvet (France) and John Gallagher (NZ).
