= Vidiri =

Vidiri may refer to:

- Vidiri people, ethnic group in the Central African Republic and Sudan
- Joeli Vidiri (born 1973), Fijian rugby union player
