= List of tallest buildings in Paraguay =

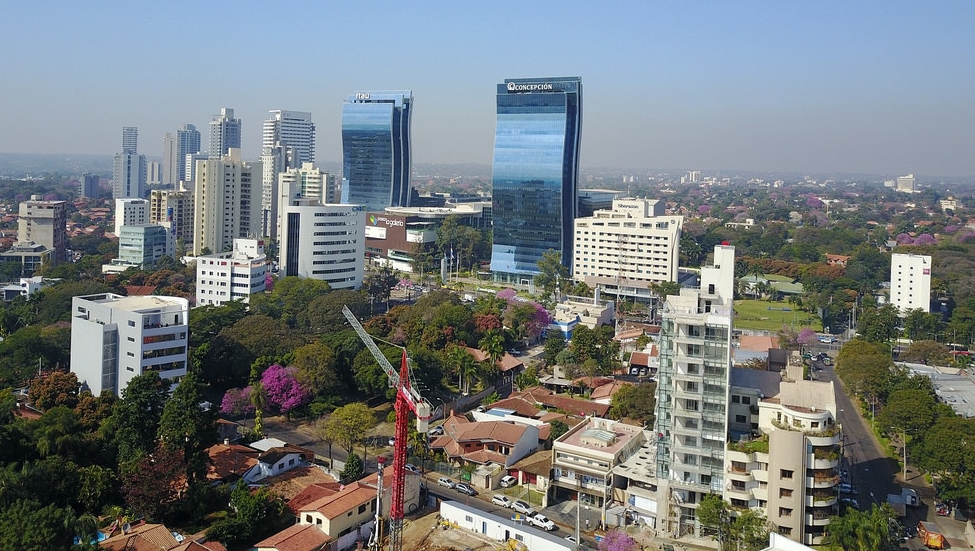
Asunción, the capital and most populated city of Paraguay, concentrates the vast majority of the tallest buildings in the country.

The following table shows the tallest buildings in Paraguay. The heights, in metre, are considered from street level to the maximum structural height, call it water tanks, elevator boxes, etc., without considering telecommunication antennas.

== Tallest skyscrapers ==
Was the tallest building in Paraguay upon completion

Tallest skyscrapers in Paraguay (more than 100 m)
Rank	Building	Image	City	Height	Floors	Year	Reference
1	Petra Tower		Asunción	172 m	44	2025	
2	Icono Tower		Asunción	142 m	37	2014	
3	Torre Lapacho		Asunción	135 m	33	2021	
4	Sky Tower		Asunción	123 m	35	2018	
5	Torre Jacarandá		Asunción	110 m	28	2021	
6	The Tower		Asunción	110 m	30	2018	
7	More del Sol		Asunción	115 m	27	2022	
8	Fortaleza Boggiani		Asunción	112 m	29	2022	
9	The Top		Asunción	110 m	22	2022	
10	Sabe Center Hotel		Asunción	109 m	29	2002	
11	Torre Miranda		Asunción	109 m	30	2019	
12	Eminent - Torre I		Asunción	109 m	32	2020	
13	The Forest - Torre I		Asunción	108 m	24	2020	
14	Wilson Tower		Asunción	107 m	33	1993	
15	Elysium		Asunción	106 m	30	2022	
16	Torre Aviadores		Asunción	105 m	25	2016	
17	Forvm Molas López		Asunción	104 m	28	2023	
18	Palacio de los Patos I		Asunción	102 m	34	2020	
19	Palacio de los Patos II		Asunción	102 m	34	2020	
15	Curupayty II		Asunción	100 m	27	1993	
20	Torres del Paseo I		Asunción	100 m	25	2016	
21	Torres del Paseo II		Asunción	100 m	25	2016	

- (¹) - The heights, in m, are considered from street level to the maximum structural height, including water tanks, elevator boxes, etc., but without considering telecommunication antennas.

== Skyscrapers under construction ==
Skyscrapers under construction
Rank	Building	City	Height	Floors	Year	Reference
1	Petra Imperiale	Asunción	250 m	73	2029	
2	Paseo 55	Asunción	212 m	55	2028	
3	Sudameris Plaza	Asunción	188 m	39	2027	
4	47th Tower Residencial	Ciudad del Este	150 m	47	TBD	
5	Petra Icon	Asunción	147 m	39	2026	
