= Reserve Bank of Fiji Headquarters =

High-rise building in Suva

Reserve Bank of Fiji Building
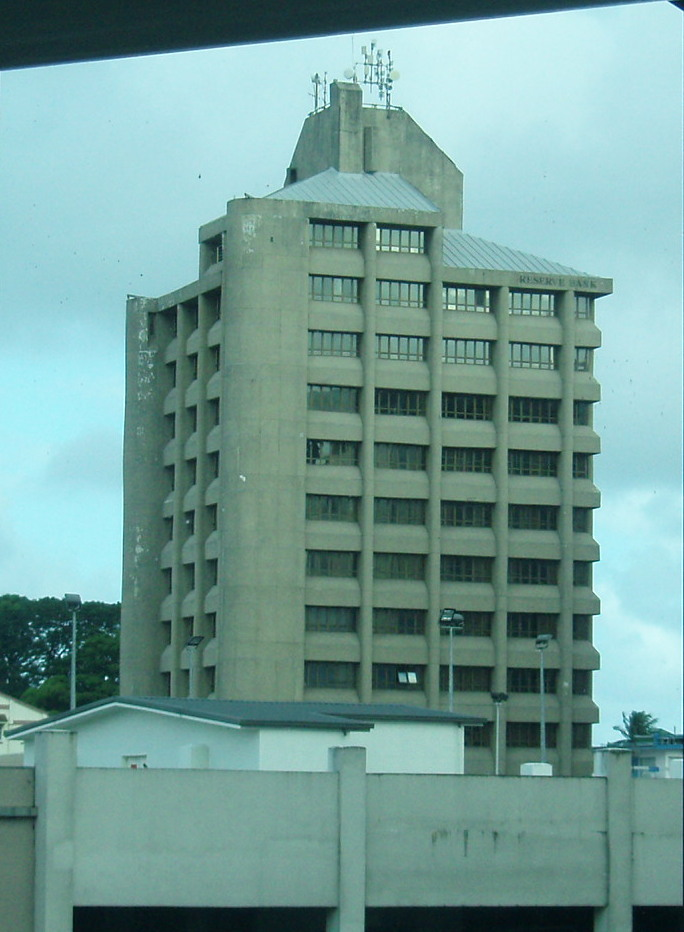
- Interactive map of the Reserve Bank of Fiji Building area

General information
- Status: Completed
- Type: Office
- Location: Suva, Fiji, VC6F+5X8, Pratt Street, Suva
- Coordinates: 18.13956°S 178.42494°E
- Completed: 1985

Height
- Roof: 65 m (213 ft)

Technical details
- Structural system: Concrete
- Floor count: 17

Design and construction
- Architect: Architects Pacific (renovation)

The Reserve Bank of Fiji Building is a high-rise office building in Suva, Fiji, standing at 65 metres (213 ft) tall with 17 floors, currently serving as the headquarters of the Reserve Bank of Fiji (RBF) since its completion in 1985. It was the first-ever high-rise construction ever built in Fiji and was the tallest in the country between 1985 and 2021.

== History ==
=== Architecture ===
The construction was the first-ever high-rise building in Suva, therefore the first one to begin defining its skyline. The architects needed to come up with the concept of a functional design to ensure that the solution met the requirements of a construction which could include the national vault. They first established the safety conditions which included the incorporation of tsunami floodgates in order to protect the vaults placed in the underground levels. Bespoke Fijian design details, such as fire doors laminated with masi panels into formica, and the usage of Fijian plantation pine for the suspended ceiling, contributed towards representing the Fijian design in the building.

== See also ==
- Architecture of Fiji
- List of tallest buildings in Oceania

Records
Preceded by	Tallest building in Fiji; 1985–2021	Succeeded by WG Friendship Plaza Suva
