= List of tallest buildings by country =

This section provides a list of the tallest buildings in the world by country, featuring the single highest building within each nation. The data includes only those buildings that are either completed or topped out. Currently, 25 countries contain supertall skyscrapers exceeding 300 m (984 ft), while four nations possess megatall skyscrapers surpassing 600 m (1,969 ft). Although many nations completed their tallest buildings during the 2010s, certain countries remain defined by historical landmarks. For instance, the Caana temple at Caracol in Belize, which dates to approximately the 9th century CE, continues to serve as the tallest building in the nation.

== Completed or topped out ==
This list includes the single tallest building in each country, restricted to buildings that are either completed or topped out. Heights are measured to the architectural top, a calculation that incorporates permanent spires while excluding non-architectural elements such as antenna masts.

Tallest building in the continent
Topped out but not yet completed

Country/Territory	Building	City	Height	Floors	Year	Image	Notes
Afghanistan	Mohib Towers	Kabul	101 m (331 ft)	28	2021		
Albania	Downtown One	Tirana	150 m (492 ft)	40	2025		
Algeria	Great Mosque of Algiers Tower	Algiers	265 m (869 ft)	37	2019		Tallest minaret in the world.
Andorra	Caldea	Escaldes–Engordany	80 m (262 ft)	18	1994		
Angola	IMOB Business Tower	Luanda	145 m (476 ft)	35	2018		
Antigua and Barbuda	Royalton Antigua	Five Islands Village	31 m (102 ft)	9	2019		
Argentina	Alvear Tower	Buenos Aires	235.2 m (772 ft)	55	2018		
Armenia	Renaissance Premium Home	Yerevan	130 m (430 ft)	39	2025 (topped out)		
Australia	Q1	Gold Coast	322.5 m (1,058 ft)	78	2005		Tallest building in Oceania and the second tallest building in the Southern Hemisphere.
Austria	DC Tower 1	Vienna	220 m (722 ft)	60	2013		
Azerbaijan	Baku Tower	Baku	276.3 m (906 ft)	49	2020		Tallest building in Caucasus.
Bahamas	Atlantis Royal Tower East	Paradise Island	93 m (305 ft)	23	1998		
Bahrain	Four Seasons Hotel Manama	Manama	269.7 m (885 ft)	50	2015		
Bangladesh	Pinnacle	Dhaka	152.3 m (500 ft)	40	2026		Considered the tallest building in Bangladesh, following the City Centre Dhaka, which is officially recorded at an architectural height of 118 meters.
Barbados	Central Bank of Barbados	Bridgetown	50 m (164 ft)	11	1985		
Belarus	Minsk International Financial Center	Minsk	170 m (560 ft)	42	2024 (topped out)		
Belgium	Tour du Midi	Brussels	150 m (490 ft)	38	1967		
Belize	Caana	Caracol	43 m (141 ft)		ca. 9th century CE		
Benin	BCEAO building	Cotonou	64 m (210 ft)	16	1994		
Bermuda	Gibbs Hill Lighthouse	Southampton Parish	36 m (118 ft)		1846		
Bhutan	Sangye Migyur Ling Lhakhang	Ramitey	55 m (180 ft)	10	2019		
Bolivia	Green Tower	La Paz	163.4 m (536 ft)	40	2022		
Bosnia and Herzegovina	Avaz Twist Tower	Sarajevo	172 m (564 ft)	39	2008		
Botswana	iTowers	Gaborone	105 m (344 ft)	30	2016		
Brazil	Yachthouse Residence Club	Balneário Camboriú	294.1 m (965 ft)	80	2024		
Brunei	Ministry of Finance Building	Bandar Seri Begawan	120 m (394 ft)	21	2001		
Bulgaria	Sky Fort	Sofia	202.2 m (663 ft)	47	2023 (topped out)		
Burkina Faso	National Monument of Heroes	Ouagadougou	78 m (256 ft)	6	2009		
Burundi	Toha Hotel	Bujumbura	40 m (130 ft)	12	2026		
Cambodia	KBX Universal Financial Center	Phnom Penh	264.6 m (868 ft)	63	2026 (topped out)		
Cameroon	Prime Ministry Building	Yaoundé	90 m (295 ft)	19	1987		
Canada	SkyTower at Pinnacle One Yonge	Toronto	351.4 m (1,153 ft)	106	2026 (topped out)		
Cape Verde	Edificio Verde Cara	Mindelo	46.6 m (153 ft)	13	2014		
Cayman Islands	60 Nexus Way	Camana Bay	47.2 m (155 ft)	10	2023		
Central African Republic	Ouday Skaiky Tower	Bangui	44 m (144 ft)	14	2016		
Chad	SHT Tower	N'djamena	75 m (246 ft)	22	2025 (topped out)		
Chile	Gran Torre Costanera	Santiago	300 m (984 ft)	62	2013		Tallest building in South America.
China	Shanghai Tower	Shanghai	632 m (2,073 ft)	128	2015		Tallest twisted building in the world.
Colombia	BD Bacatá Torre Sur	Bogotá	216 m (709 ft)	66	2018		
Comoros	Badjanani Mosque	Moroni	36 m (118 ft)		1427		
Congo	Tours Mpila	Brazzaville	135 m (443 ft)	30	2019		
Congo DR	Riverside Towers	Kinshasa	108 m (354 ft)	30	2023		
Costa Rica	Leumi Business Center	San José	141 m (463 ft)	38	2021		
Croatia	Dalmatia Tower	Split	135 m (443 ft)	28	2023		
Cuba	La Torre López-Callejas	Havana	154 m (505 ft)	42	2025		
Curaçao	Plaza Hotel Curaçao	Willemstad	50 m (164 ft)	14	1957		
Cyprus	One Limassol	Limassol	170 m (558 ft)	37	2022		
Cyprus	Trilogy Limassol Seafront West Tower	Limassol	170 m (558 ft)	39	2024		
Czech Republic	AZ Tower	Brno	111 m (364 ft)	30	2013		
Denmark	Mindet 6	Aarhus	145.35 m (476.9 ft)	41	2026 (topped out)		
Djibouti	Mezz Tower	Djibouti City	51 m (167 ft)	16	2017		
Dominica	Financial Centre	Roseau	26 m (85 ft)	7	2003		
Dominican Republic	Anacaona 27 Tower	Santo Domingo	161 m (528 ft)	41	2017		
East Timor	DFBC Tower 1	Dili	57.4 m (188 ft)	16	2021 (topped out, currently on hold)		
Ecuador	Maxximus Guayaquil	Guayaquil	184 m (604 ft)	51	2027		
Egypt	Iconic Tower	New Administrative Capital	393.8 m (1,292 ft)	77	2024		Tallest building in Africa.
El Salvador	Torre Millennium	San Salvador	125 m (410 ft)	25	2022		
Equatorial Guinea	Gepetrol Building	Malabo	58 m (190 ft)	14	2009		
Eritrea	NICE Building	Asmara	39 m (128 ft)	11	2013		
Estonia	St. Olaf's Church	Tallinn	123.7 m (406 ft)		1519		Tallest building in the world between 1549 and 1625.
Eswatini	Mona Residence	Mbabane	39 m (128 ft)	11	2007		
Ethiopia	Commercial Bank of Ethiopia Headquarters	Addis Ababa	209.3 m (687 ft)	53	2021		Tallest building in East Africa.
Fiji	WG Friendship Plaza Suva	Suva	112 m (367 ft)	28	2021 (topped out, currently on hold)		
Finland	Prysmian Pikkala Cable Tower	Kirkkonummi	185 m (607 ft)	24	2025		
France	The Link	Puteaux (Note: La Defense is the Paris metropolitan area’s business district, located on the outskirts.)	241.6 m (793 ft)	52	2025		
Gabon	Banque des États de l'Afrique Centrale	Libreville	70 m (230 ft)	15	2009		
Gambia, The	Bitcoin Tower	Bijilo	60 m (200 ft)	16	2026 (topped out)		
Georgia	Alliance Centropolis Tower C	Batumi	210 m (689 ft)	56	2025 (topped out)		
Germany	Commerzbank Tower	Frankfurt	259 m (850 ft)	56	1997		Tallest building in the European Union from 1997 to 2012 and from 2020 to 2021.
Ghana	The Bank Square	Accra	100 m (330 ft)	22	2024		
Greece	Riviera Tower	Elliniko-Argyroupoli	200 m (660 ft)	50	2027 (topped out)		
Grenada	Waldorf Apartments	St. George's	23 m (75 ft)	7	2022		
Guatemala	Altaire	Guatemala City	112 m (367 ft)	32	2025		
Guinea	Kakimbo Towers	Conakry	100 m (328 ft)	28	2018		
Guinea-Bissau	Bissau Cathedral	Bissau	52 m (171 ft)		1950		
Guyana	Pegasus Hotel & Suites	Georgetown	39.5 m (129.5 ft)	11	2021		
Haiti	Digicel Turgeau	Port-au-Prince	49 m (161 ft)	13	2008		
Honduras	Torre Atlas	Tegucigalpa	136 m (446 ft)	42	2025		
Hong Kong	International Commerce Centre	Kowloon	484 m (1,588 ft)	108	2010		
Hungary	MOL Campus	Budapest	143 m (469 ft)	28	2022		
Iceland	Smáratorg Office Tower	Kópavogur	77.6 m (255 ft)	20	2008		
India	Palais Royale, Mumbai	Mumbai	320 m (1,050 ft)	88	2018 (topped out, expected to be completed in 2025)		Tallest building in South Asia.
Indonesia	Autograph Tower	Jakarta	382.9 m (1,256 ft)	75	2022		Tallest building in the Southern Hemisphere.
Iran	Fereshteh Pasargad Hotel	Tehran	235 m (771 ft)	46	2026 (topped out)		
Iraq	E1 Tower	Erbil	180 m (591 ft)	48	2023		
Ireland	St Colman's Cathedral, Cobh	Cobh	95.3 m (313 ft)		1919		
Israel	Beyond Office Tower	Givatayim	308.3 m (1,011 ft)	72	2025 (topped out)		
Italy	Unicredit Tower	Milan	217.7 m (714 ft)	35	2012		
Ivory Coast	Tour F	Abidjan	421 m (1,381 ft)	76	2025 (topped out)		Structurally topped out, currently at 333 meters.
Jamaica	The Pinnacle	Montego Bay	100 m (328 ft)	28	2025 (topped out)		
Japan	Azabudai Hills Mori JP Tower	Tokyo	325.2 m (1,067 ft)	64	2023		
Jordan	Jordan Gate North Tower	Amman	200 m (660 ft)	43	2026		
Kazakhstan	Abu Dhabi Plaza	Astana	310.8 m (1,020 ft)	75	2022		Tallest building in Central Asia.
Kenya	Britam Tower	Nairobi	200.1 m (656 ft)	31	2017		
Kiribati	Kiribati Parliament Building	Tarawa	15.5 m (51 ft)	1	2000		
Kosovo	Pristina City Center	Pristina	125 m (410 ft)	32	2021 (topped out)		
Kuwait	Al Hamra Tower	Kuwait City	412.6 m (1,354 ft)	80	2011		
Kyrgyzstan	Gravity	Bishkek	110 m (360 ft)	25	2026 (topped out)		
Laos	Xinyue City Center	Golden Triangle Special Economic Zone	146 m (479 ft)	32	2024 (topped out)		
Latvia	Zunda Towers	Riga	123 m (404 ft)	30	2017		
Lebanon	Sama Beirut	Beirut	195.2 m (640 ft)	52	2016		
Lesotho	Standard Lesotho Bank Building	Maseru	39 m (128 ft)	11	1980?		
Liberia	Central Bank of Liberia	Monrovia	39 m (128 ft)	11	2015		
Libya	Burj Bulaya Office Tower 1	Tripoli	144 m (472 ft)	34	2007		
Liechtenstein	Schwefelstrasse 25	Vaduz	39 m (128 ft)	11	2003		
Lithuania	Europa Tower	Vilnius	129 m (423 ft)	33	2004		Tallest building in Baltic states.
Luxembourg	Palais de la Cour de Justice, Rocca tower	Luxembourg	118 m (387 ft)	31	2019		
Macau	Grand Lisboa	Sé	258 m (846 ft)	48	2008		
Madagascar	Orange Telecommunication Tower	Antananarivo	125 m (410 ft)	33	2013		
Malawi	President Walmont Hotel	Lilongwe	43 m (141 ft)	12	2012		
Malaysia	Merdeka 118	Kuala Lumpur	678.9 m (2,227 ft)	118	2023		Tallest building in ASEAN, and the second tallest building in the world.
Maldives	Dharumavantha Hospital	Malé	100 m (328 ft)	25	2018		
Mali	BCEAO Tower	Bamako	80 m (262 ft)	20	1999		
Malta	Mercury Tower	St. Julian's	112 m (367 ft)	31	2022		
Marshall Islands	Republic of the Marshall Islands Capitol Building	Majuro	15 m (49 ft)	4	1993		demolished in 2025
Mauritania	Immeuble SNIM	Nouakchott	54 m (177 ft)	15	2018		
Mauritius	Bank of Mauritius Building	Port Louis	124 m (407 ft)	22	2006		
Mexico	T.Op Torre 1	Monterrey	305.3 m (1,002 ft)	64	2020		Tallest building in Latin America.
Micronesia	Level 5 Hotel	Weno	15 m (49 ft)	5	2014		
Moldova	Romashka Tower	Chișinău	77 m (253 ft)	20	1986		
Monaco	Tour Odéon	Monaco	170 m (558 ft)	49	2015		
Mongolia	Eco Tower One	Ulaanbaatar	243 m (797 ft)	55	2026 (topped out)		
Montenegro	Bemax soliter	Podgorica	55 m (180 ft)	12	2018		
Morocco	Mohammed VI Tower	Salé	250 m (820 ft)	55	2025		
Mozambique	Banco de Moçambique Tower 1	Maputo	130 m (427 ft)	31	2016		
Myanmar	Diamond Inya Palace	Yangon	122 m (400 ft)	34	2019		
Namibia	Old Mutual Namibia Headquarters	Windhoek	100 m (328 ft)	21	2010		
Nauru	OD-N-Aiwo Hotel	Aiwo District	17 m (56 ft)	4	1973?		
Nepal	Damak Tower	Damak	100 m (330 ft)	18	2024		
Netherlands	De Zalmhaven	Rotterdam	215 m (705 ft)	59	2022		
New Zealand	Seascape	Auckland	187.2 m (614 ft)	56	2024 (topped out, currently on hold)		Tallest building in Polynesia.
Nicaragua	Banco de America	Managua	61 m (200 ft)	17	1970		
Niger	Ministère des Finances	Niamey	75 m (246 ft)	16	2020		
Nigeria	NECOM House	Lagos	160.3 m (526 ft)	32	1979		
North Korea	Ryugyong Hotel	Pyongyang	330 m (1,083 ft)	105	2011 (never completed)		
North Macedonia	Cevahir Towers	Skopje	130 m (427 ft)	41	2018		
Norway	Nexans Halden Extrusion Tower 2	Halden	152.9 m (502 ft)		2024		
Oman	Sheraton Oman Hotel	Muscat	53 m (174 ft)	16	1985		
Pakistan	Bahria Icon Tower	Karachi	273 m (896 ft)	62	2023 (topped out, currently on hold)		
Palau	Palasia Hotel	Koror	25 m (82 ft)	7	1998		
Palestine	Palestine Trade Tower	Ramallah	76 m (249 ft)	20	2012		
Panama	JW Marriott Panama	Panama City	284 m (932 ft)	70	2011		
Papua New Guinea	Noble Center	Port Moresby	100 m (328 ft)	23	2019 (uninhabitable)		Tallest building in Melanesia.
Paraguay	Petra Tower	Asunción	172 m (564 ft)	44	2025 (topped out)		
Peru	Torre Banco de la Nación	Lima	140.1 m (460 ft)	30	2015		
Philippines	Metrobank Center	Manila	318 m (1,043 ft)	66	2018		
Poland	Varso Tower	Warsaw	310 m (1,017 ft)	53	2022		Tallest building in the European Union.
Portugal	Torre Vasco da Gama	Lisbon	160 m (520 ft)	22	1998		Widely misreported as 145 m (476 ft).
Qatar	Lusail Plaza Tower 3 & 4	Lusail	300.7 m (988 ft)	66	2023		
Romania	Floreasca City Sky Tower	Bucharest	137 m (449 ft)	37	2012		
Russia	Lakhta Center	Saint Petersburg	462 m (1,516 ft)	87	2018		Tallest building in Europe.
Rwanda	Kigali City Tower	Kigali	90 m (295 ft)	20	2013		
Saint Kitts and Nevis	St. George's Anglican Church	Basseterre	26 m (85 ft)		1859		
Saint Lucia	Courtyard By Marriott Hotel	Castries	30 m (98 ft)	8	2024 (topped out)		
Saint Vincent and the Grenadines	St. George's Anglican Cathedral	Kingstown	43 m (141 ft)		1945 or Before		
Samoa	Samoan Government Building	Apia	34 m (112 ft)	8	1994		
San Marino	World Trade Center	Serravalle	39 m (128 ft)	11	2004		
São Tomé and Príncipe	Monte Palácio	São Tomé	21 m (69 ft)	7	1993?		
Saudi Arabia	Abraj Al Bait	Mecca	601 m (1,972 ft)	120	2012		Tallest clock tower in the world.
Senegal	Immeuble Kébé	Dakar	76.2 m (250 ft)	21	1973		
Serbia	Belgrade Tower	Belgrade	168 m (551 ft)	42	2024		
Seychelles	Le Chantier Mall	Victoria	30 m (98 ft)	7	2013		
Sierra Leone	Sam Bangura Building	Freetown	64 m (210 ft)	16	1971?		
Singapore	Guoco Tower	Singapore	283.7 m (931 ft)	65	2016		
Slovakia	Eurovea Tower	Bratislava	168 m (551 ft)	46	2023		
Slovenia	Crystal Palace (Ljubljana)	Ljubljana	89 m (292 ft)	20	2011		
Solomon Islands	Anthony Saru Building	Honiara	21 m (69 ft)	7	2009		
Somalia	Dahab Tower	Mogadishu	100 m (328 ft)	25	2024 (topped out)		
Somaliland	Salam Tower	Hargeisa	70 m (148 ft)	15	2025		
South Africa	The Leonardo	Sandton	234 m (768 ft)	56	2019		Tallest building in Africa from 2019 to 2022.
South Korea	Lotte World Tower	Seoul	554.5 m (1,819 ft)	123	2017		Tallest building in the OECD.
South Sudan	Equatoria Tower	Juba	46 m (151 ft)	15	2015		
Spain	Torre de Cristal	Madrid	249 m (817 ft)	50	2008		
Sri Lanka	Altair	Colombo	240 m (787 ft)	68	2019		
Sudan	NTC Tower	Khartoum	130 m (427 ft)	29	2009		
Suriname	Assuria Hermitage Highrise	Paramaribo	55 m (180 ft)	10	2019		
Sweden	Karlatornet	Gothenburg	246 m (807 ft)	74	2024		Tallest building in Scandinavia.
Switzerland	Roche Tower 2	Basel	205 m (673 ft)	50	2022		
Syria	Skaya Tower	Tartus	~125 m (410 ft)–130 m (430 ft)	33	2025		
Taiwan	Taipei 101	Taipei	508 m (1,667 ft)	101	2004		Tallest building in the world from 2004 to 2010.
Tajikistan	Communications Service Building	Dushanbe	123 m (404 ft)	30	2021		
Tanzania	PPF Tower II	Dar es Salaam	160 m (525 ft)	37	2019		
Thailand	Iconsiam	Bangkok	315 m (1,033 ft)	70	2018		
Togo	2 Fevrier Sofitel Hotel	Lomé	102 m (335 ft)	36	1980		
Tonga	St George's Palace	Nukuʻalofa	23 m (75 ft)	5	2017		
Trinidad and Tobago	International Waterfront Tower D	Port of Spain	114 m (374 ft)	27	2008		
Tunisia	Tour de la nation	Tunis	80 m (263ft)	23	2004		Tower of the nation (Old RCD party Headquarters) is as tall as Hotel Africa but considered the tallest building in Tunisia.
Turkey	IFC Central Bank Tower	Istanbul	352 m (1,155 ft)	59	2024		
Turkmenistan	Turkmenistan Tower	Ashgabat	173 m (568 ft)	16	2011		
Tuvalu	Tuvalu Government Building	Funafuti	16 m (52 ft)	3	2004		
Uganda	NSSF Pension Towers	Kampala	155 m (509 ft)	32	2023 (topped out)		
Ukraine	Klovski Descent 7	Kyiv	168 m (551 ft)	48	2011		
United Arab Emirates	Burj Khalifa	Dubai	828 m (2,717 ft)	163	2010		Tallest building in the world.
United Kingdom	The Shard	London	309.6 m (1,016 ft)	73	2013		Tallest building in the European Union from 2012 to 2020.
United States	One World Trade Center	New York City	541.3 m (1,776 ft)	104	2014		Tallest building in the Americas, and tallest office building in the world. Tallest building in the OECD from 2014 to 2017.
Uruguay	Torre Antel	Montevideo	157.6 m (517 ft)	32	2002		
Uzbekistan	Nest One	Tashkent	266.5 m (874 ft)	51	2023		
Vanuatu	Grand Hotel and Casino Vanuatu	Port Vila	22 m (72 ft)	8	1990s		
Vatican City	St. Peter's Basilica	Vatican City	136.5 m (448 ft)	1	1626		
Venezuela	Isla Multiespacio	Valencia	243.8 m (800 ft)	55	2025 (topped out, currently on hold)		
Vietnam	Landmark 81	Ho Chi Minh City	461.2 m (1,513 ft)	81	2018		
Yemen	Al Saleh Mosque	Sana'a	100 m (328 ft)		2008		
Zambia	Pyramid Continental Hotel	Lusaka	130 m (430 ft)	27	2024 (topped out)		
Zimbabwe	New Reserve Bank Tower	Harare	120 m (394 ft)	28	1997		

== Under construction ==
This list includes the tallest buildings currently under construction that are projected to become the tallest structure within their respective nations upon completion.

Country	Building	City	Height (m)	Height (ft)	Floors	Estimated Completion	References
Albania	Bond Tower	Tirana	200.6	658	55	2032	
Algeria	Dzair Media City Main Tower	Algiers	310	1,017	TBA	2027	
Australia	1 Park Lane	Gold Coast	393	1,289	101	2032	
Azerbaijan	Cipriani Tower	Baku	323	1,060	60+	2031	
Bangladesh	Jolshiri Twin Towers	Dhaka	250	820	65	TBA	
Belarus	Minsk Gazprom Headquarters	Minsk	189	620	36	2027	
Brazil	Senna Tower	Balneário Camboriú	544	1,785	154	2035	
Cambodia	Naga 3 Tower A	Phnom Penh	358	1,175	75	2026	
Colombia	Atrio South Tower	Bogotá	268	879	62	2028	
Ecuador	Maxximus Guayaquil	Guayaquil	184	604	51	2026	
Gabon	Tour de Libreville	Libreville	204	669	52	2027	
Georgia	VR Vake Sky Tower	Tbilisi	260	853	70	2029	
Guatemala	Danta 14	Guatemala City	158	518	42	TBA	
India	Ocean Towers	Mumbai	331	1,086	76	2030	
Iran	Iran Mall Tower	Tehran	350	1,148	53	2027	
Iraq	First Iraq Tower	Baghdad	380	1,247	80	2028	
Ireland	Parkgate Street Block A	Dublin	102	335	30	2029	
Israel	Azrieli Spiral Tower	Tel Aviv	323	1,060	91	2027	
Japan	Torch Tower	Tokyo	385	1,263	62	2027	
Kenya	NSSF Twin Tower A	Nairobi	260	853	60	2028	
Kosovo	FM Tower	Pristina	230	755	49	TBA	
Kyrgyzstan	Manas Tower 45	Bishkek	213	699	45	2027	
Laos	Lao Center Project	Vientiane	155	509	46	2028	
Mexico	Torre Rise	Monterrey	484	1,588	94	2027	
Nigeria	First Bank of Nigeria Headquarters	Lagos	252	827	43	2027	
Paraguay	Petra Imperiale	Asunción	250	820	73	2029	
Russia	Lakhta Center II	Saint Petersburg	703	2,306	150	2031	
Rwanda	Kigali Green Complex	Kigali	150	492	29	2027	
Saudi Arabia	Jeddah Tower	Jeddah	1008.2	3308	167	2028	
Senegal	Daktower	Dakar	122	400	32	2027	
Syria	Eighth Grade Tower	Damascus	145.1	476	35	TBA	
Singapore	Skywaters at 8 Shenton Bay	Singapore	305	1,001	63	2028	
Slovenia	Emonika City Center	Ljubljana	107.5	353	28	2027	
Sri Lanka	The One Ritz-Carlton Tower	Colombo	326	1,070	80	TBA	
Ukraine	Sky Towers	Kyiv	209.6	688	47	TBA	
United States	Legends Tower	Oklahoma City	581.3	1,907	136	2030	
Uruguay	Cipriani Ocean Resort Club, Residences & Towers	Punta del Este	320	1,050	80	2029	

== See also ==
- List of tallest buildings
- List of cities with the most skyscrapers
- List of tallest buildings by city
- List of tallest buildings by U.S. state and territory
