= Navala =

- Village
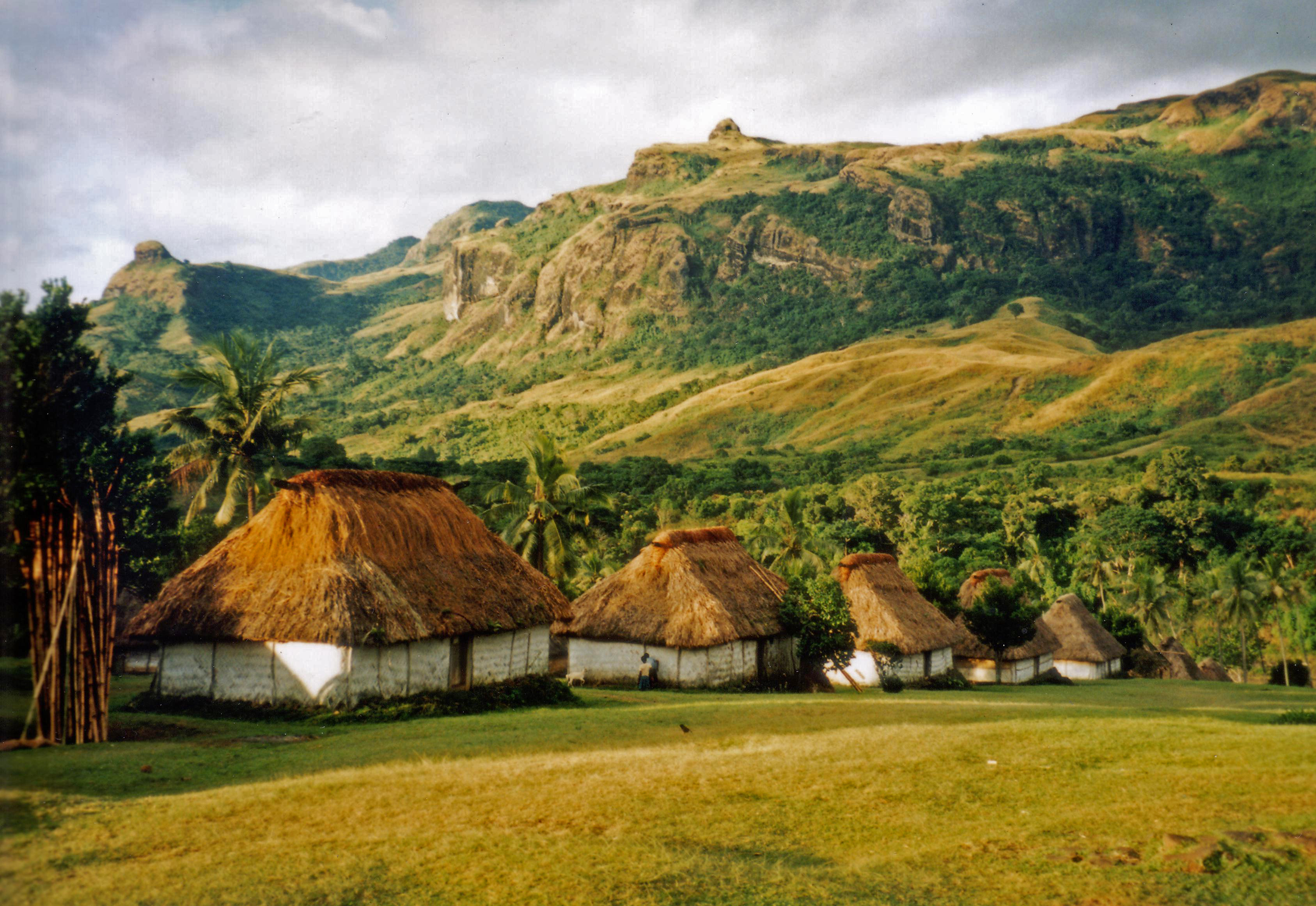
- Navala

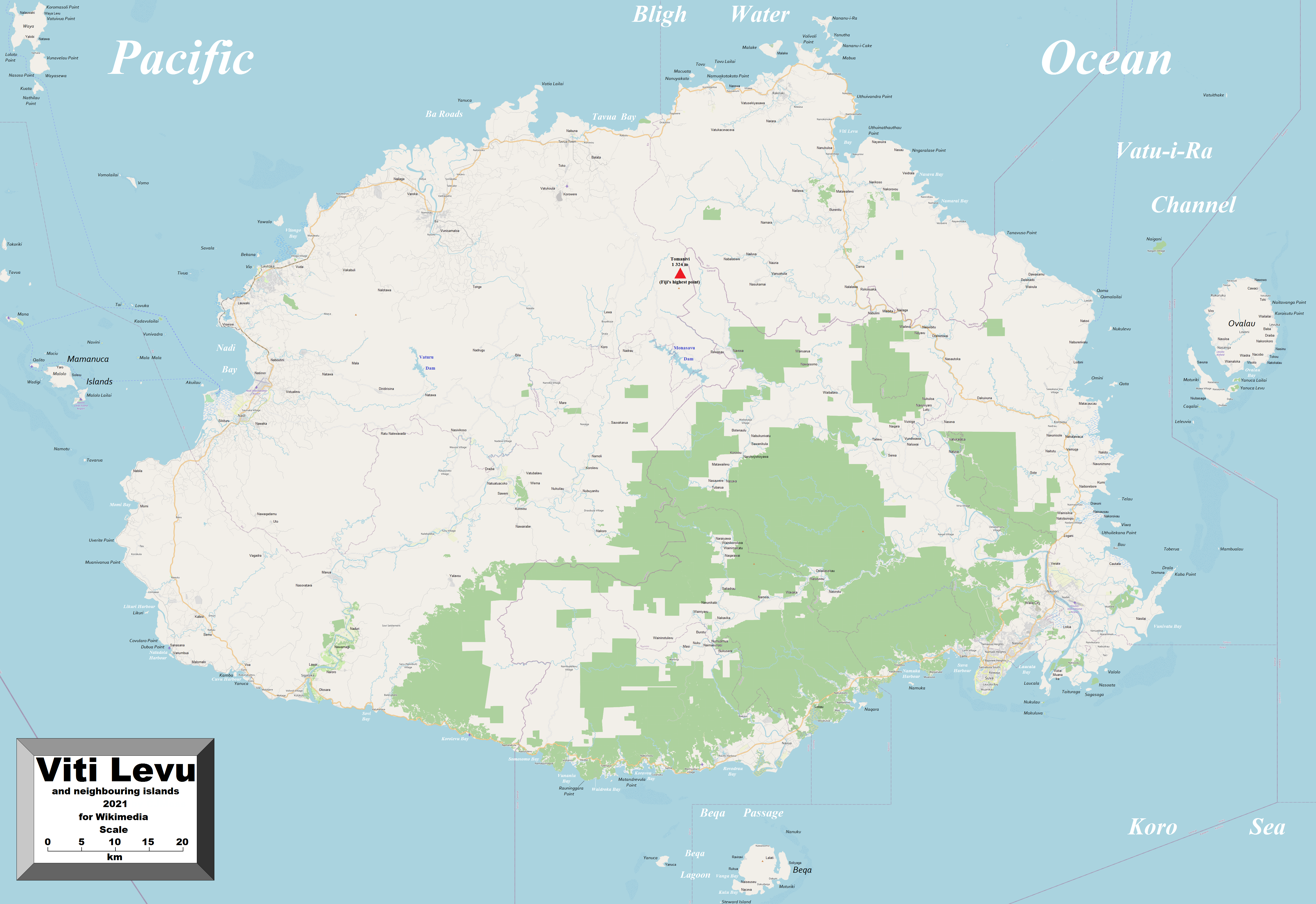
- Viti Levu with Navala in the island's centre-north

- Location in Fiji
- Coordinates: 17°40′S 177°49′E
- Country: Fiji
- Island: Viti Levu
- Division: Western Division
- Province: Ba
- Time zone: UTC+12

Navala (Fijian pronunciation: [naβala]) is a village in the Ba Highlands of northern-central, Fiji. It is noted for its thatched buildings, amounting to over 200. It is one of the few settlements in Fiji which remains fully traditional architecturally.

Navala is actually a collection of three settlements put together. It is protected by mountains and ridges. Navala is on the other side of a river. The river floods often and is the main reason for Navala's isolation from the other towns.

Navalais also a popular tourist site; a small charge is required for photography and entering the village. Navala is very special because all their houses are the same size, and retain their thatched roofs. All the bures have a metal post also known as a Bou (in Fijian). The floods attract rafters. There is bus transport between the village and the larger town of Ba.

== History ==
Navala was built back in the 19th Century, when various individuals from the Nausori Highlands villages (Such as the ghost villages of Cuvu, Batimoli and Koroboya) decided to build a school for their children.

Over the years, the two main tribes that inhabited the town, had disputes; and, allegedly, the people of Navala had reported several times their cows being slaughtered and more than six bure being torched by fire from the people that had origins from the old village of Navatusila over land ownerships disputes.

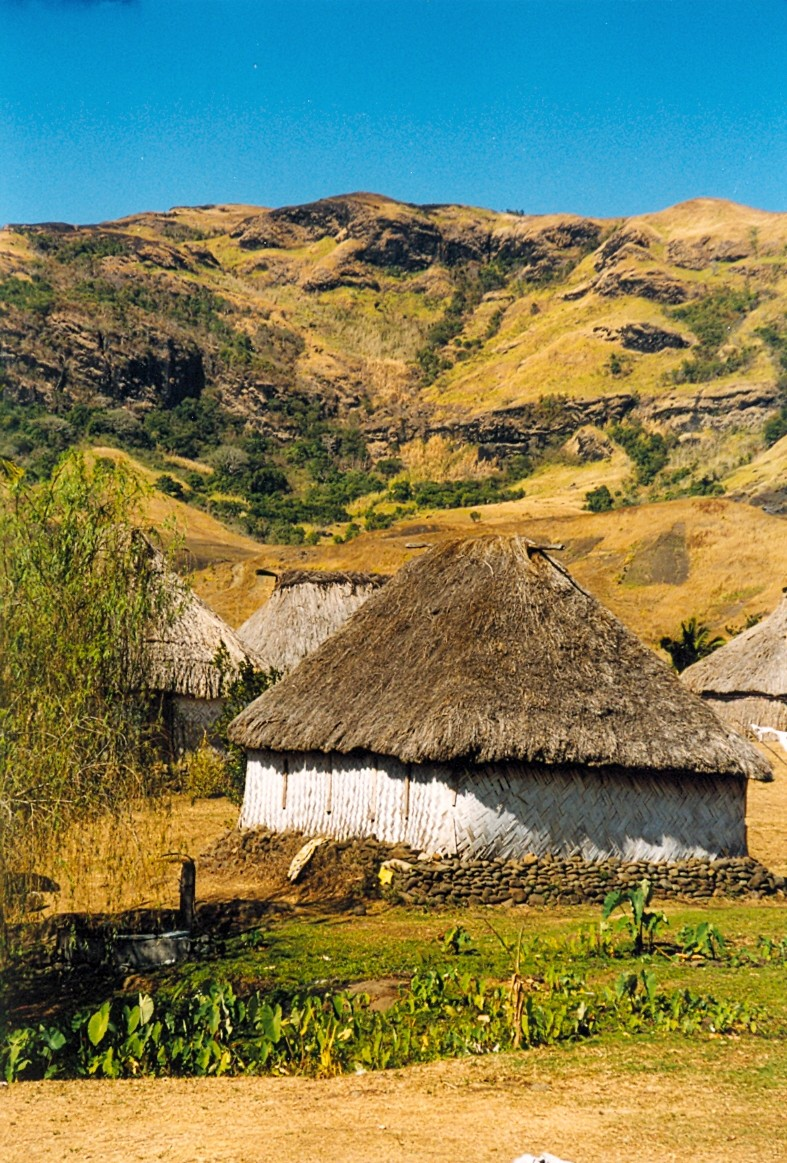
Navala
