= World Trade Center, San Marino =

Coordinates: 43.9820°N 12.4932°E

World Trade Center San Marino
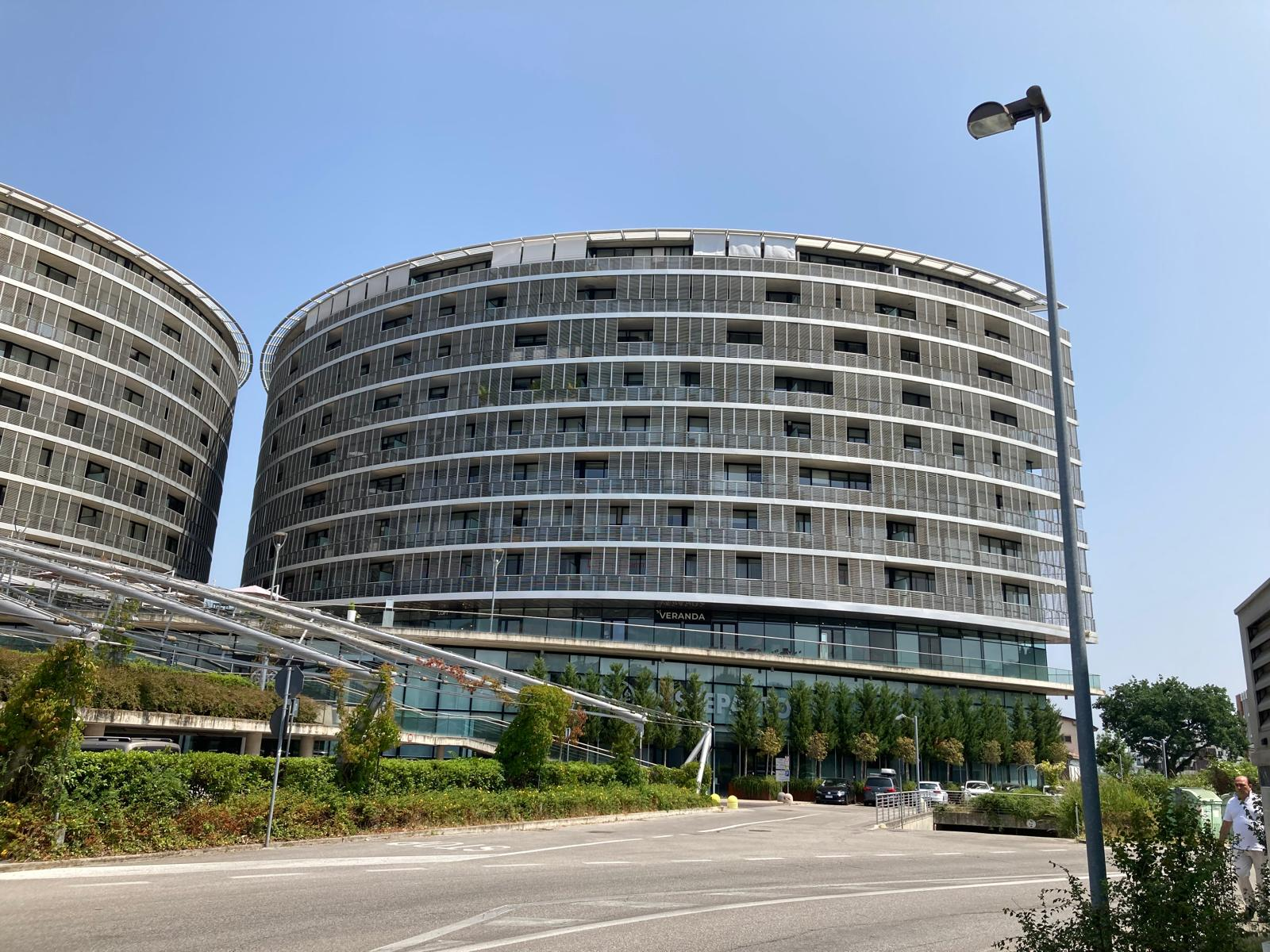
- Tallest building in San Marino, Hotel World Trade Center in Dogana as seen from Via Consiglio dei Sessanta
- Interactive map of the World Trade Center San Marino area

General information
- Type: Commercial
- Location: Serravalle, San Marino
- Cost: € 30 million

Height
- Antenna spire: 39.47 m (129 ft)

Technical details
- Floor count: 97

Design and construction
- Architect: Foster + Partners

The World Trade Center of San Marino is located in Dogana, Serravalle, only 100 meters (330 ft) from its border with Italy and the river Ausa. It was designed by British architecture firm Foster and Partners in collaboration with Studio Antao.

It was inaugurated on 25 June 2004 after 3 years of construction, covers 11 floors including the attic and has a total area of 35,000 square meters (380,000 sq ft), of which is the building is 29,000 square meters (310,000 sq ft) and the parking is 8,500 square meters (91,000 sq ft) which occupies four floors and can accommodate up to 650 cars. The cost of building was €30 million.
