= Wilson Tower =

Coordinates: 25.2667°S 57.6167°W

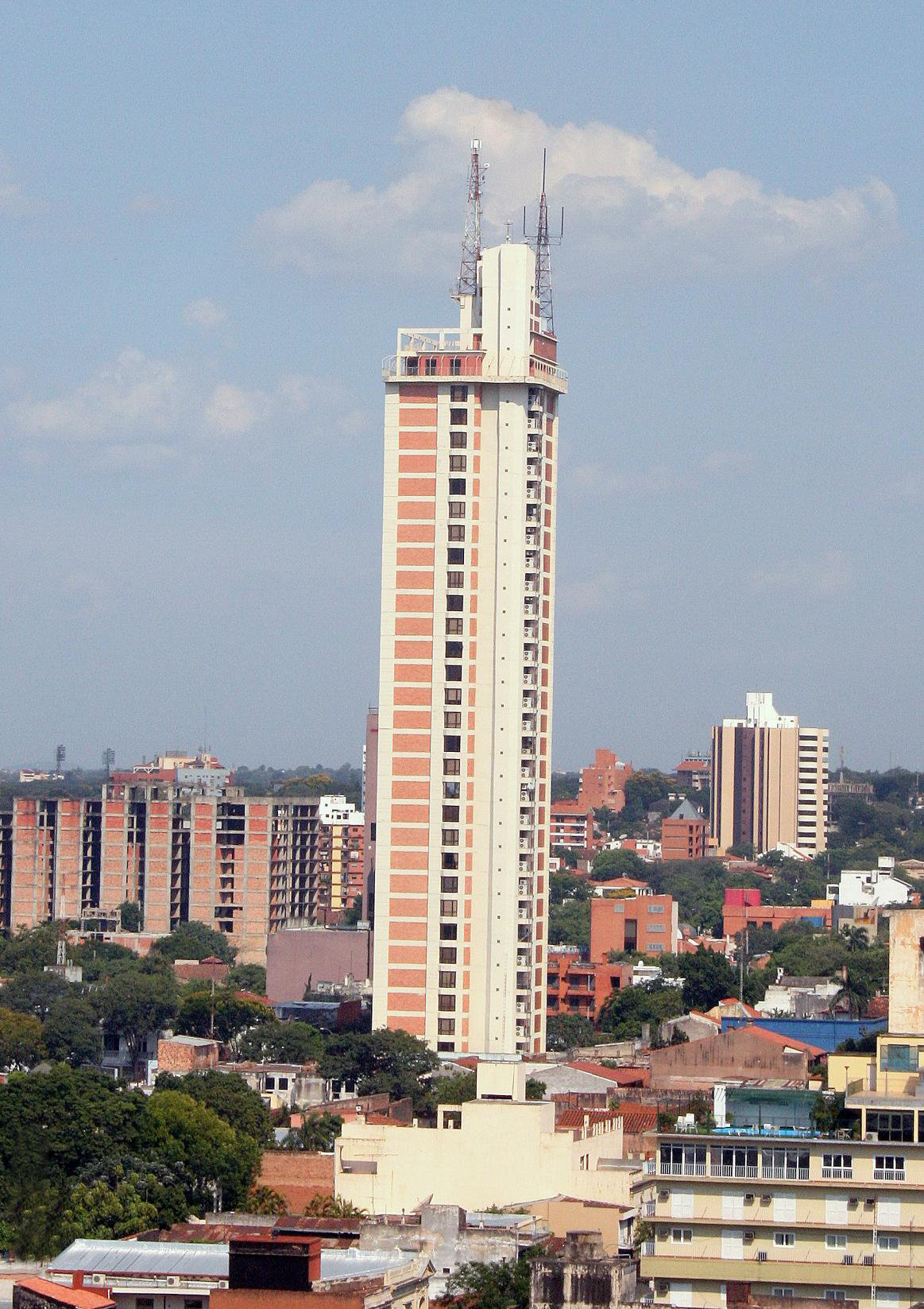
- Interactive map of the Wilson Tower area

General information
- Status: Completed
- Type: Residential
- Location: Asunción, Paraguay, Paraguay
- Completed: 1993

Height
- Roof: 107 m (351 ft)

Technical details
- Floor count: 31

Wilson Tower is a skyscraper in Asunción, Paraguay. With 107 metres (351 ft), it is currently the 11th tallest building in Paraguay. It is surpassed by 29 metres (95 ft) and four stories by the Icono Tower, also in Asunción.
