= Nausori Highlands =

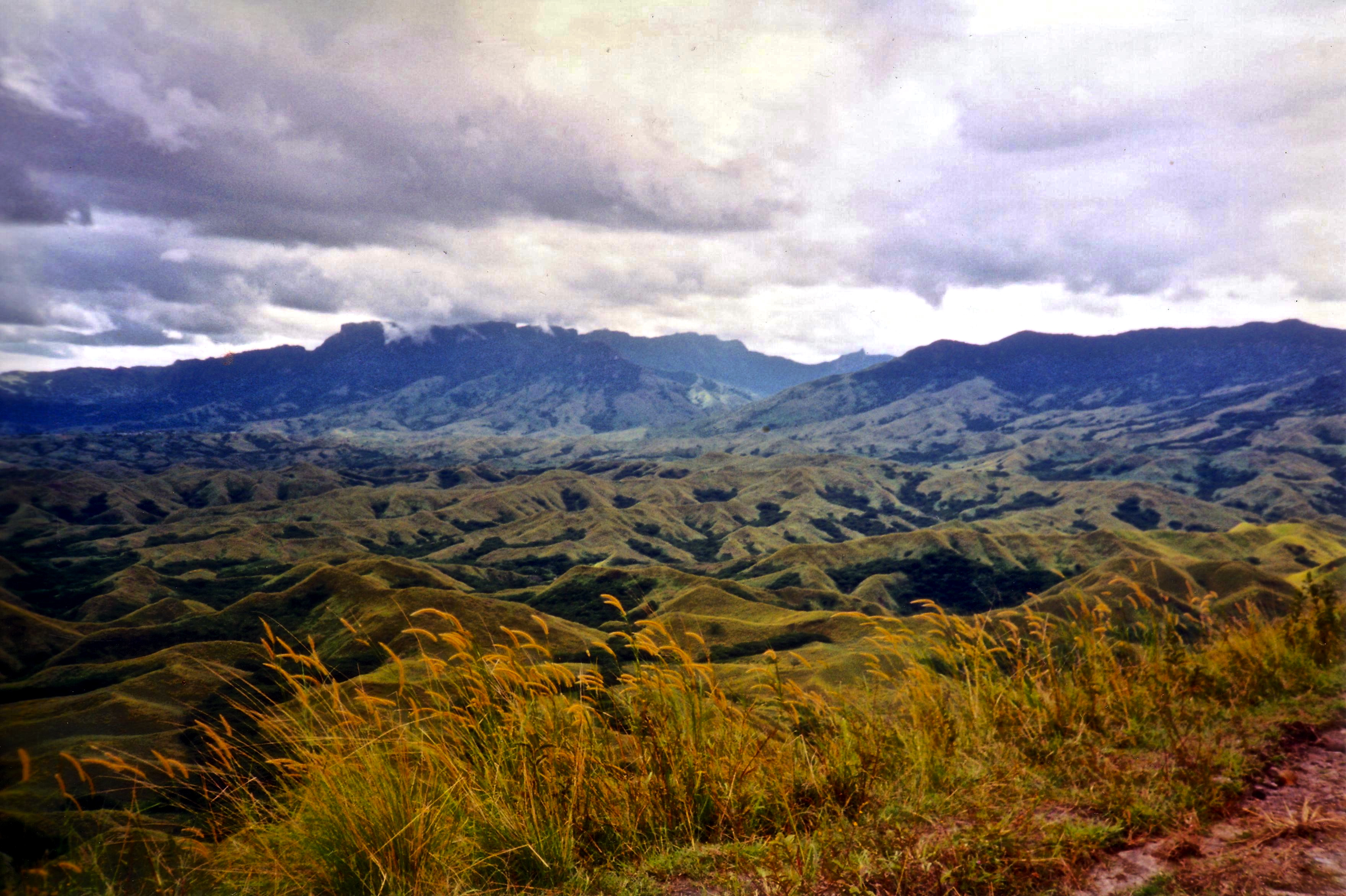
Nausori Highlands

The Nausori Highlands are located in the interior of Fiji's main island Viti Levu. One of the most picturesque villages is Navala, although there are many other small villages too. The Nausori Highlands are a great place to learn about Fijian culture. The dryzone mountain rainforest contributes to its national significance as outlined in Fiji's Biodiversity Strategy and Action Plan.

== History ==
The Nausori Highlands were originally considered (by European settlers) to be a hideout for cannibals. In Navala near a thatched house, the official residence of the chief, lies a cemetery where missionaries converted the highlands to Christianity. The Nausori Highlanders speak a different dialect of Fijian, with most villagers speaking English as a second language. Whilst Fiji's main religious denominations are Methodism and Hinduism, the main religion in the Nausori Highlands is Methodism, although there are also Seventh-day Adventists. They participate in regular Kava ceremonies. Most of the income comes from traditional farming of Kasava, which serves as a staple in their diet.

== Joeli Vidiri ==
The Nausori Highlanders are very proud of being the village where the rugby union player Joeli Vidiri was born. His photograph is displayed on the village's welcome sign.

Since the 21st century, the area has been a site of national significance.
