= Joeli Vidiri =

Fijian rugby union footballer (1973–2022)

- Full name: Joeli Vidiri Natabua Nadriubalavu Nalewavada
- Born: 23 November 1973 Nausori Highlands, Fiji
- Died: 23 February 2022 (aged 48) Sacramento, California, U.S.
- Height: 190 cm (6 ft 3 in)
- Weight: 100 kg (220 lb; 15 st 10 lb)
- School: Queen Victoria School

Rugby union career
- Position: Wing
Senior career
Years	Team	Apps	(Points)
1994–2000	Counties Manukau	71	(280)
1996–2001	Blues	64	(235)
2001	Auckland	2	(0)
- Correct as of 11 June 2020
International career
Years	Team	Apps	(Points)
1994–1995	Fiji	7	(25)
1996–1998	New Zealand Barbarians	3	(20)
1998	New Zealand	2	(5)
1999	New Zealand A	5	(5)
2000–2001	Barbarian F.C.	4	(35)
- Correct as of 11 June 2020
Medal record
Men's rugby sevens
Representing New Zealand
Commonwealth Games
Gold medal – first place	1998 Kuala Lumpur	Team competition

Joeli Vidiri (23 November 1973 – 23 February 2022) was a professional rugby union player who played as a wing. Born in Fiji, he earned seven caps for the Fiji national team before switching his allegiance to New Zealand, for whom he earned two more caps.

== Career ==
Vidiri studied at Queen Victoria School (Fiji). He represented Fiji in both 15s and sevens before coming to New Zealand in 1994. He played for the Auckland Blues in the Super 12 competition and represented Counties Manukau in the NPC. He only managed to play two tests for New Zealand in 1998. In 2001 he was diagnosed with a kidney illness and placed on dialysis treatment like his fellow Auckland Blues winger Jonah Lomu.

Vidiri played in the Super 12 for the Auckland Blues from 1996 until 2001, where he scored 43 tries in 61 games, at the time an individual record. In 2000 Joeli created the record for most tries scored in one match scoring four against the Bulls, a record which has since been broken when Sean Wainui scored five tries against the Waratahs in 2021. He had a song named after him (Give Me Hope Joeli) that was very popular with the Auckland Blues fans at home games at Eden Park. He appeared in only five Super 12 matches in 2001, with his illness impacting on his ability to play. In 2000 Vidiri played for the Barbarian F.C. against Leicester Tigers. Vidiri made 71 provincial appearances for Counties, for whom Vidiri scored 56 tries. After two early matches with Auckland in the 2001 NPC, he ended his career.

== Post career ==
After his career was cut short, it was revealed that Vidiri had been waiting on a transplant for over a decade (accurate to 2013), and on 8 April 2013 episode of Campbell Live, it had been revealed he was talked out of a kidney transplant in 2008, and had taken himself out of the waiting list due to his mother's scepticism and traditional views against transplants and surgery. He worked in Pukekohe.

Vidiri died on 23 February 2022, at the age of 48, in Sacramento, California, from complications of COVID-19 during the COVID-19 pandemic in California, shortly after getting married. Tributes from the Rugby community were shared through the New Zealand media.
