= WG Friendship Plaza Suva =

Skyscraper in Suva

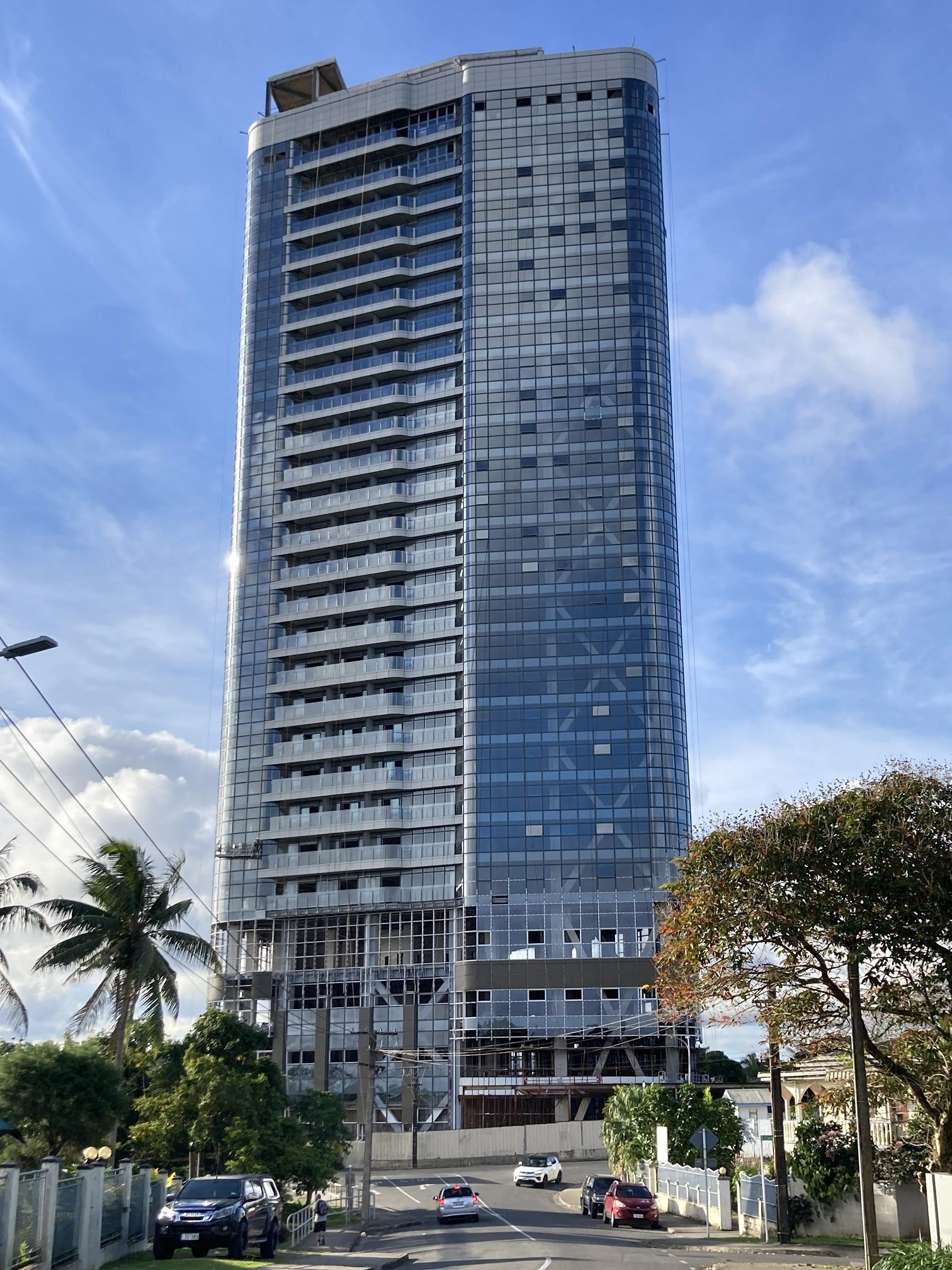
- Interactive map of the WG Friendship Plaza Suva area

General information
- Status: Under construction
- Location: Suva, Fiji, McGregor Road VC3J+C7F
- Coordinates: 18°08′47″S 178°25′51″E
- Groundbreaking: 2017
- Topped-out: 2021
- Completed: 2026 as the estimate completion year

Height
- Roof: 112 m (367 ft)

Technical details
- Structural system: Steel
- Floor count: 28
- Floor area: 8,000 m^{2} (86,100 sq ft)

Design and construction
- Architect: Xiaolong Hu
- Structural engineer: CORETECH Fiji
- Main contractor: WG International Real Estate Co. (Fiji) Limited

The WG Friendship Plaza Suva is a high-rise mixed-use skyscraper under construction in Suva, Fiji, currently serving as the tallest building in the country, as well as the tallest building in Oceania outside Australia and New Zealand. The tower was topped out in 2021 and is 112 meters (367 ft) tall, being divided into 28 floors. The official opening was expected to take place in the second half of 2024.

Upon its completion, the tower is set to contain the functions of a hotel, serviced apartments and offices.

Currently, construction and work on the tower have been temporarily halted due to safety concerns.

== See also ==
- Architecture of Fiji
- List of tallest buildings in Oceania

Records
Preceded by Reserve Bank of Fiji Building	Tallest building in Fiji; 2021–present	Succeeded by Incumbent
