= Fortune International Group =

Real estate company

- Industry: Real Estate
- Founder: Edgardo Defortuna
- Area served: South Florida
- Number of employees: 100
- Website: fortuneintlgroup.com

Fortune International Group is a Miami-based real estate company with development projects in South Florida, Latin America, and Europe.

== Overview ==
Fortune International Group offers a range of services, including real estate design and development, construction, general brokerage, project sales and marketing, and asset management services.

Edgardo Defortuna is the president and CEO of Fortune International Group.

== History ==
In 1983, Edgardo Defortuna founded Fortune International Group.

In 2004, the company completed Jade Residences project, a residential skyscraper in Brickell, Miami.

In 2013, the group began sales and construction of Jade Signature which was the fourth "jade" building by Fortune International Group. Jade Signature was designed by Herzog & de Meuron and has fifty-seven stories.

In January 2015, entities owned by Defortuna and his associates, collectively owning a total of five condo units at the Tropicana, filed a lawsuit challenging the condo association’s plan to change its governing documents, the first step in the association’s plan to dissolve the building’s condo status and sell the building.

In June 2022, Fortune International Group formed a partnership with Saunders & Associates, a real estate brokerage in New York. As a part of the partnership, the two firms will refer clients between each market.

In October 2022, Fortune International Group partnered with Christie’s International Real Estate as Christie’s affiliate in Miami-Dade and Broward counties.

== Notable projects ==
The company’s notable projects include Jade Residences at Brickell Bay, Jade Beach, Jade Ocean, Jade Signature, The Ritz-Carlton Residences-Sunny Isles Beach, Artech, Auberge Beach Residences and Spa Fort Lauderdale, 1200 Brickell, Le Meridien Sunny Isles Beach.
