= Icono Tower =

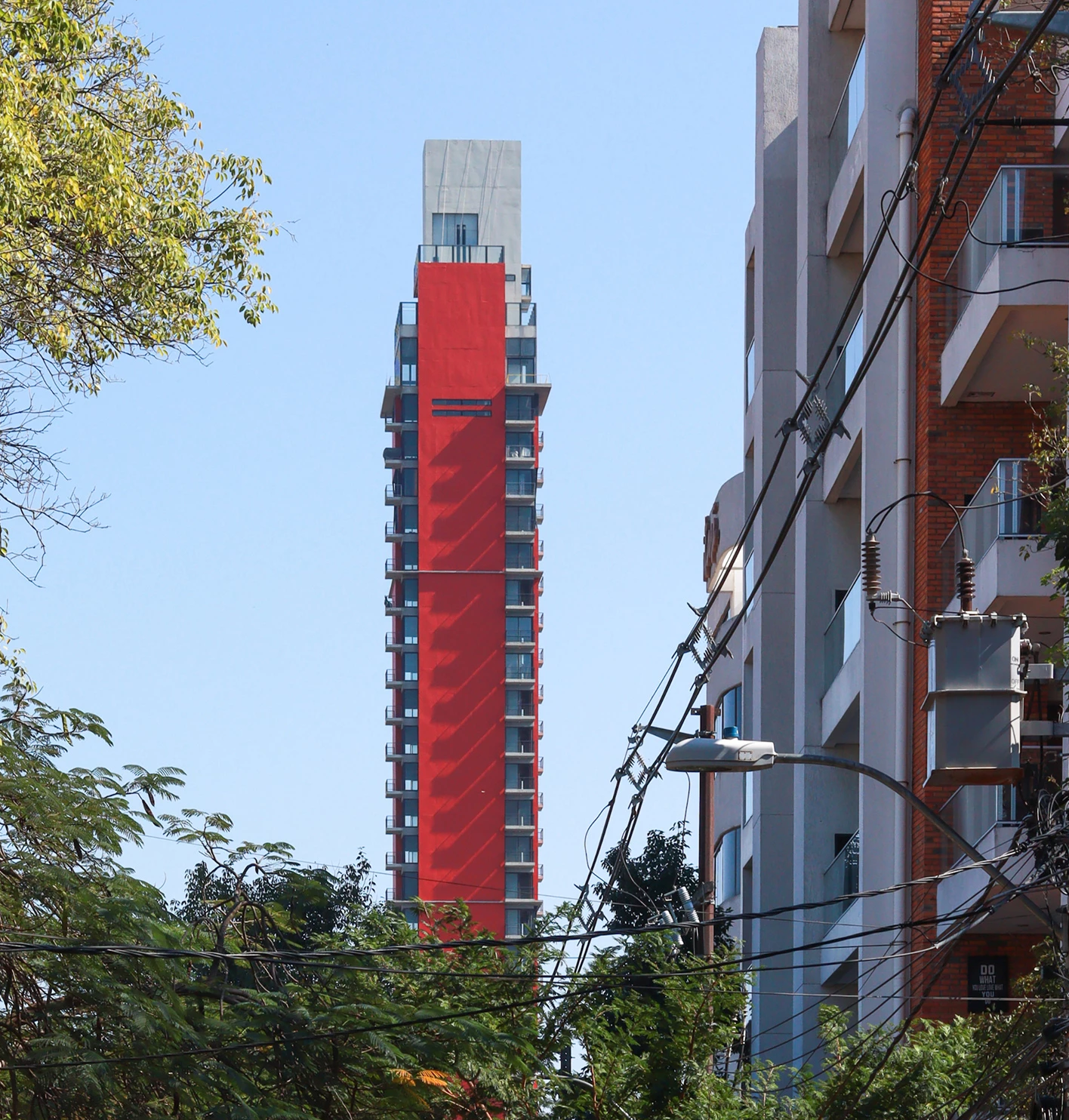
- View of Icono in 2023
- Interactive map of the Icono Tower area

General information
- Type: Residential
- Location: Asunción, Paraguay
- Coordinates: 25.2843°S 57.6174°W
- Construction started: 2008
- Completed: 2014

Height
- Roof: 142 m (466 ft)

Technical details
- Floor count: 37

Design and construction
- Architect: Carlos A. Jiménez (ESTARQ)
- Developer: BBVA
- Structural engineer: Ángel Gaona
- Main contractor: CITE SA

Website
- Icono Tower

The Icono Tower also known as the Icono Lofts is a residential skyscraper in Asunción, Paraguay. Built between 2008 and 2014, the tower stands at 142 m (466 ft) tall with 37 stories. It was the tallest building in Paraguay between 2014 and 2025, when it was surpassed by Petra Tower which is a 172 m (564 feet) tall residental skyscraper. It still stands as one of the most dominant skyscrapers in South America due to its isolated position from the downtown district and Los Lomas/Ycua Sati barrios that hold the majority of the new highrises in the city.

== History ==
The Icon Tower is located on the corner of Juan de Salazar and Boquerón streets in Asunción and has two particularities: it is the tallest in the city and the first to apply the "loft" concept, that is, empty apartments that are sold completely independently so that their owners can design and complete them as they wish. This also allows the entire level to be for each resident, and will not be subdivided with the traditional neighbors of large apartment buildings.

The tower has a final height of 142 meters, with 38 habitable floors, of which 32 are residential and 5 house common and social areas. The inauguration of the building took place in 2011, but the work on the site was officially completed in 2014 with the name "Icon". This type of residence is common in cities such as Buenos Aires, São Paulo, Berlin, New York and other metropolises around the world.

The Icon is one of the most strategic buildings in the capital city of Paraguay, as it is located at the confluence of the main avenues of Asunción: Mariscal López, Perú, España and General Artigas.

The structure was developed with the latest anti-seismic architectural technology and can also withstand winds of more than 200 km/h, without residents perceiving any oscillation. The architect of the building says that it stands out from other surrounding buildings not only for its height, but also for the incredible panoramic view of the city of Asunción thanks to its two side blocks that allow for larger windows. The tower has been completed, its inauguration was in 2019. However, its presence in the landscape of Asunción has already become a reference, with almost the entire city visible.

== Gallery ==
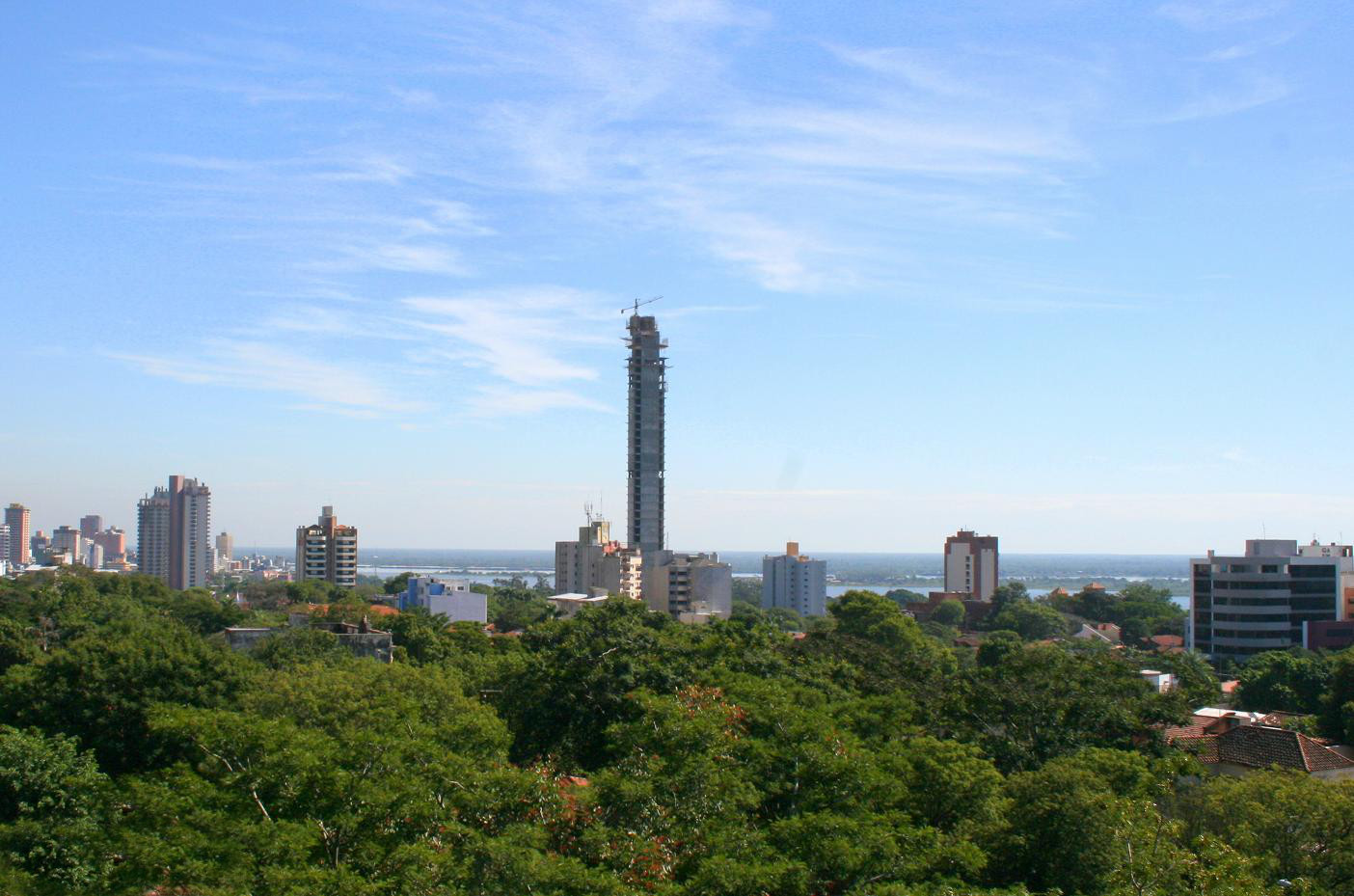
The tower under construction in 2010...

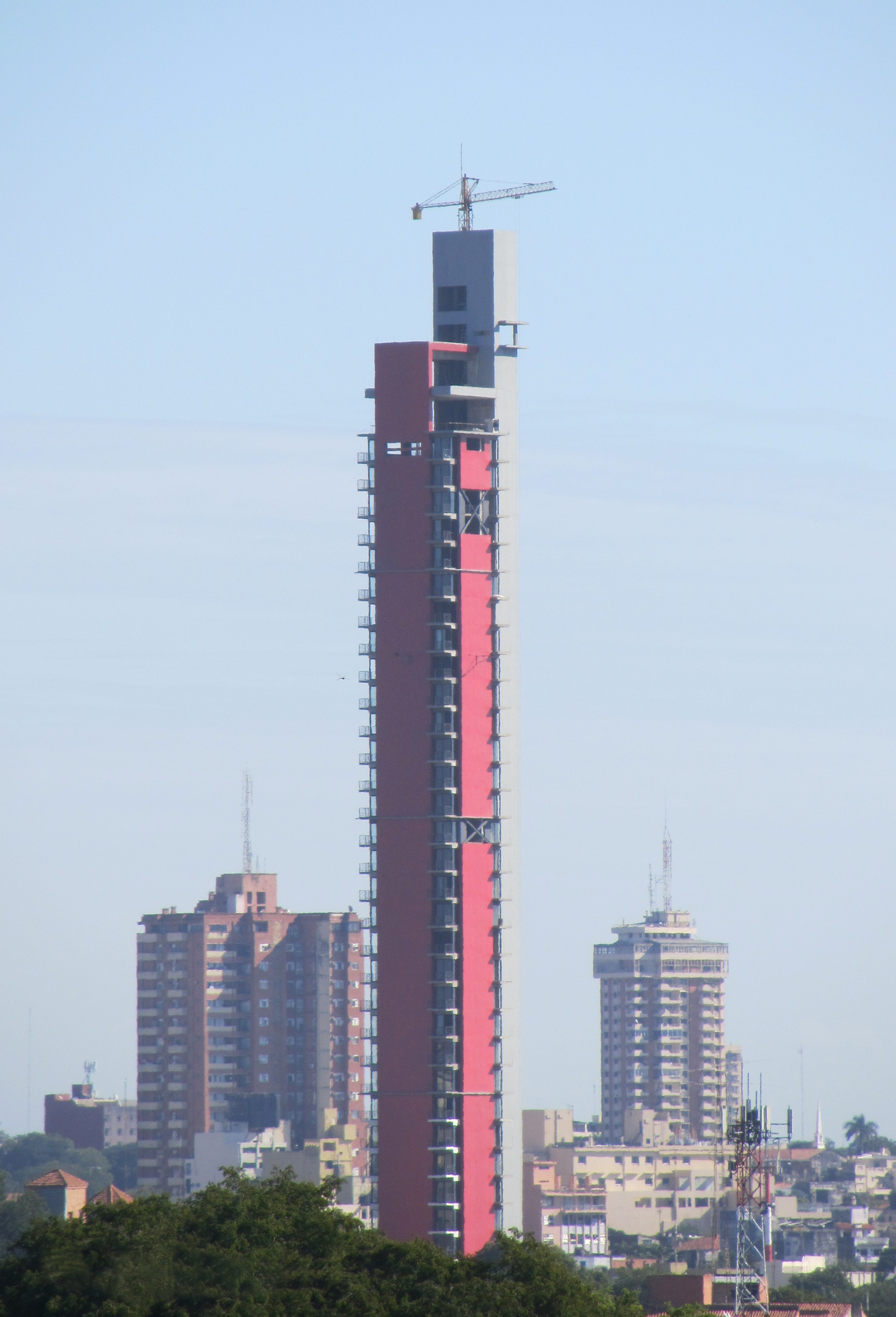
...and in 2012.

== See also ==
- List of tallest buildings in Paraguay
- List of tallest buildings in South America
- List of tallest buildings by country

Records
Preceded by Sabe Center Hotel	Tallest building in Paraguay; 2017–2025	Succeeded by Petra Tower
