= Bure (Fiji) =

Fijian wood and straw hut

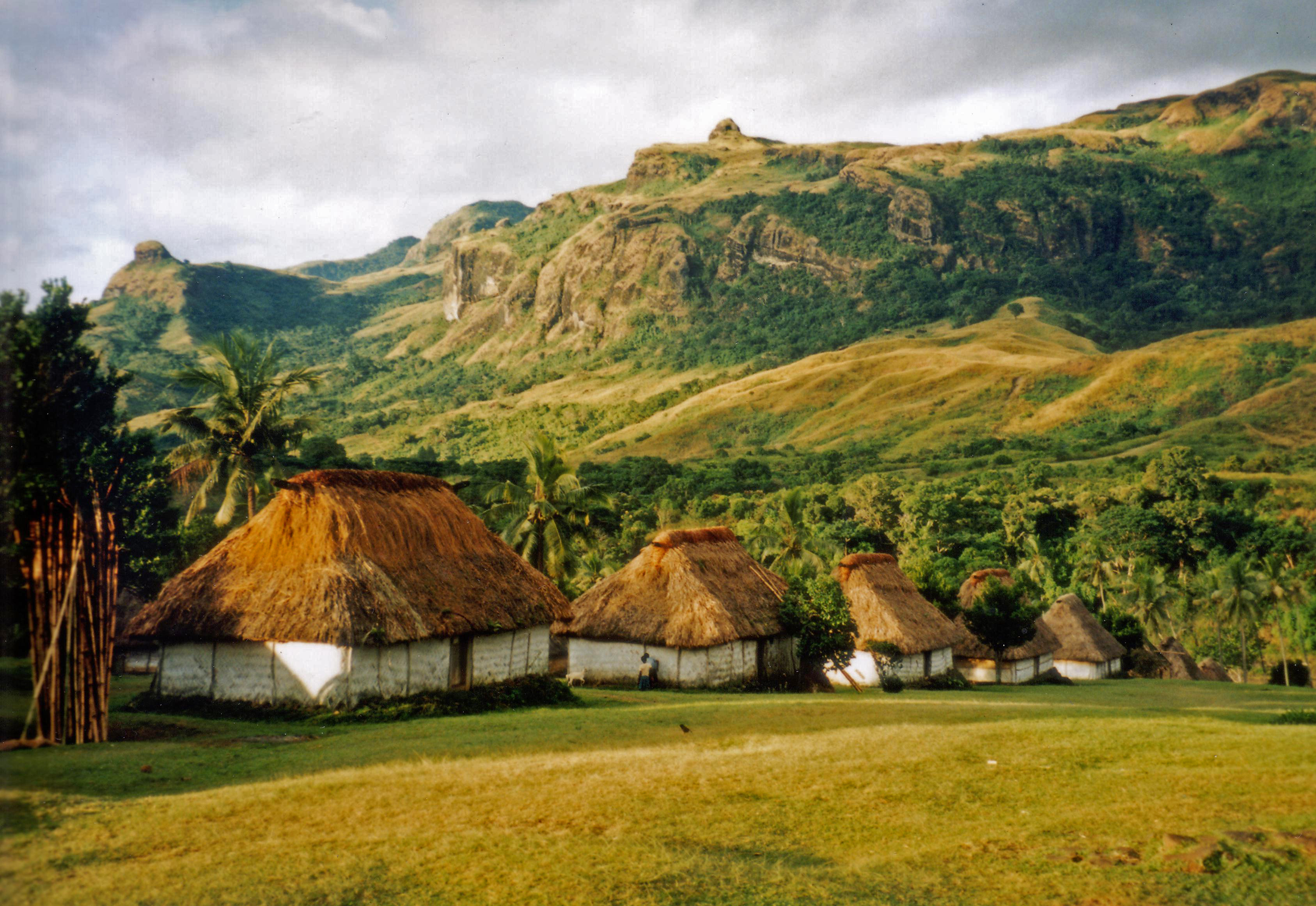
Fijian bures in Navala

Bure is the Fijian word for a wood-and-straw hut, sometimes similar to a cabin.

In its original sense, a bure is a structure built of anything that comes to hand. The components of a bure are either stacked together, tied together by rope, or a combination of both methods.

Traditionally, ethnic Fijians lived in two types of houses; a vale was the family house, while men's houses (where circumcised males of the clan met, ate, and slept) were known as bures. Both of these buildings were dark and smoky inside, with no windows and usually only one low door. Vales had hearth pits where the women cooked, and the packed earth floor was covered with grass or fern leaves and then carpeted with pandanus leaf or coarse coconut leaf mats.

== Tourism ==
Especially in the Fijian tourism industry and its advertisements, the term "bure" is often synonymous with "bungalow" or any other detached hotel or resort structure. While a traditional bure has neither plumbing nor any amenities, and usually no electricity, a tourism bure will be of the same standard as its European or North American equivalent. A tourism bure can range from fairly basic to extremely luxurious.
