= Timeline of Reykjavík =

Notable events in the capital of Iceland

The following is a timeline of the history of the city of Reykjavík, Iceland.

== Prior to 20th century ==
- 1750s – Innréttingarnar textile workshops established.
- 1752 – Aðalstræti 10 (house) built.
- 1771 – Prison begins operating.
- 1785 – "Skálholt bishop's seat is moved to Reykjavík."
- 1786
  - Town charter granted by Danish government.
  - Menntaskólinn í Reykjavík (school) active.
- 1796 – Lutheran Reykjavík Cathedral built.
- 1798 – Alþingi (Icelandic assembly, Althingi or Althing) relocated to Reykjavík from Þingvellir.
- 1800
  - 6 June: Althingi abolished.
  - 11 July: "A new high court in Reykjavík takes over the responsibilities of Althingi."
- 1801 – Lutheran Bishop of Iceland headquartered in Reykjavík.
- 1816 – Icelandic Literary Society founded.
- 1825 – Icelandic National Library begins operating.
- 1845 – Althingi active again.
- 1846 – Latin School relocated to Reykjavík from Bessastaðir.
- 1847 – Theological seminary established.
- 1848 – Þjóðólfur newspaper begins publication.
- 1872 – Eymundsson bookshop in business.
- 1874
  - 1000th anniversary of colonization.
  - Thorvaldsen statue erected in Austurvöllur.
- 1876 – Medical school opens.
- 1879 – Icelandic Archaeological Society founded.
- 1881 – Alþingishúsið (parliament house) built.
- 1882 – Hótel Ísland in business.
- 1886 – Landsbanki (bank) established.
- 1890 – Population: 6,700 in town; 70,927 on island.
- 1896 – Dagskrá daily newspaper begins publication.
- 1897 – Reykjavík Theatre Company founded.
- 1899 – Reykjavík Football Club formed.

== 20th century ==
- 1903
  - Office of Danish minister for Iceland relocated to Reykjavík from Copenhagen.
  - Fríkirkjan í Reykjavík (church) built.
- 1904 – Íslandsbanki (1904) (bank) established.
- 1906 – Fjalakötturinn cinema opens on Aðalstræti (street).
- 1907 – Reykjavík Athletic club formed.
- 1908 – Women's suffrage takes effect in Reykjavík.
- 1909 – National Library building opens.
- 1911
  - University of Iceland established.
  - 1911 Iceland industrial fair held.
- 1912 – Route 41 (Iceland) (Keflavík–Reykjavík) constructed.
- 1913 – Morgunblaðið daily newspaper begins publication.
- 1914 – Eimskipafélag Íslands (steamship company) founded.
- 1915
  - January: Prohibition in Iceland begins.
  - 25 April: Reykjavík fire of 1915.
- 1916
  - Icelandic Federation of Labour headquartered in Reykjavík.
  - Social Democratic Party (Iceland) founded in Reykjavík.
- 1918 – January: Danish–Icelandic Act of Union signed in Alþingishúsið.
- 1919 – Population: 16,154.
- 1925 – Reykjavík City Orchestra formed (approximate date).
- 1927 – Gamla bíó (cinema) active.
- 1929 – Landakotskirkja (church) built.
- 1930
  - Ríkisútvarpið radio headquartered in Reykjavík.
  - National Hospital opens.
  - Reykjavík College of Music established.
  - Garnaslagurinn (labor dispute) occurs.
  - Hótel Borg in business.
  - Population: 28,052.
- 1932 – 9 November: Gúttóslagurinn (labor dispute) occurs.
- 1940 – May: British occupation begins.
- 1943 – Listamannaskálinn (exhibit hall) built on Kirkjustræti (street).
- 1944
  - Reykjavík becomes capital of Republic of Iceland.
  - Hotel Winston built.
- 1946 – Civilian Reykjavík Airport in operation.
- 1947 – Austurbæjarbíó (cinema) built.
- 1949 – March: 1949 anti-NATO riot in Iceland.
- 1950
  - Iceland Symphony Orchestra formed.
  - Population: 55,980.
- 1957 – Árbæjarsafn (history museum) founded.
- 1961 – Háskólabíó (cinema) in business.
- 1965
  - Landsvirkjun (national power company) established.
  - Laugardalshöll (arena) opens.
- 1968 – Roman Catholic Diocese of Reykjavík established.
- 1972 – World Chess Championship 1972 held in city.
- 1974 – Population: 84,589.
- 1975 – 24 October: Women's rights demonstration.
- 1981 – House of Commerce built.
- 1986
  - August: City bicentennial.
  - October: USSR–USA summit held in city.
  - 9 November: Ships sunk in Reykjavík Harbor by environmentalist Sea Shepherd Conservation Society.
  - Hallgrímskirkja (church) built.
  - Sister city relationship established with Seattle, USA.
- 1987 – Bíóborgin (cinema) active.
- 1996 – Supreme Court of Iceland courthouse built.
- 1998 – Population: 106,753.
- 1999
  - Reykjavík Power Authority (utility) formed.
  - Iceland Airwaves music festival begins.
- 2000 – Landspítali (hospital) established.

== 21st century ==
- 2002 – Reykjavík Mosque opens.
- 2005 – Population: 114,800 in city; 187,105 metro.
- 2007
  - 18 April: 2007 Reykjavík fire
  - Dagur Bergþóruson Eggertsson becomes mayor.
  - Grand Hótel Reykjavík tower built.
- 2008
  - October: Icelandic financial crisis protest begins.
  - Hanna Birna Kristjánsdóttir becomes mayor.
- 2009
  - 2009 Icelandic financial crisis protests.
  - Höfðatorg Tower 1 built.
- 2010
  - 29 May: Reykjavík City Council election, 2010 held.
  - Jón Gnarr becomes mayor.
  - Vatnsstígur 16-18 hi-rise built.
- 2011 – Harpa (concert hall) opens.
- 2012 – Population: 117,764 in city; 203,678 metro.
- 2014 – Dagur Bergþóruson Eggertsson becomes mayor again.

== See also ==
- List of mayors of Reykjavík
- Other names of Reykjavík
- Timeline of Icelandic history

== Bibliography ==
- "Reykjavik", Norway, Sweden, and Denmark (10th ed.), Leipzig: Karl Baedeker, 1912, hdl:2027/uva.x030531120
- Jónsdóttir, Salvör (1988), Reykjavik, Scandinavian Atlas of Historic Towns, ISBN 8774926047
- Reykjavík City Profile (PDF), City of Reykjavík, 2006
