= List of tallest buildings and structures in Iceland =

This is a list of the tallest buildings and structures in Iceland.

== Tallest buildings ==
Was the tallest building in Iceland upon completion

Rank	Name	Image	City	Year	Height	Floors
1	Smáratorg Tower		Kópavogur	2007	78 m (256 ft)	20
2	Hallgrímskirkja		Reykjavík	1986	74.5 m (244 ft)	
3	Höfðatorg Tower 1		Reykjavík	2009	74 m (243 ft)	19
4	Vatnsstígur 16–18		Reykjavík	2006–2010	69.35 m (227.5 ft)	19
5	Norðurturninn		Kópavogur	2016	60 m (200 ft)	15
6	Grand Hótel Reykjavík		Reykjavík	2007	59 m (194 ft) (est)	14
7	House of Commerce		Reykjavík	1975–1981	54 m (177 ft)	14
8	Stillholt 19–21		Akranes	2006–2007	45 m (148 ft)	
9	Harpa Concert Hall		Reykjavík	2011	43 m (141 ft)	4

== Tallest nonbuilding structures ==
An incomplete list of the tallest nonbuilding structures in Iceland.

Was the tallest structure in Iceland upon completion

Rank	Name	Image	City	Year	Structure type	Height	Notes
1	Hellissandur longwave radio mast		Hellissandur	1963	Guyed mast	412 m (1,352 ft)	Insulated against ground; used until 1994 for LORAN-C, then for RÚV longwave broadcasting until 2024; tallest structure in Western Europe
2	NRTF Grindavík (mast 1)		Grindavík	1993		304.8 m (1,000 ft)	Used for military LF transmission
3	Kárahnjúkar Dam		Kárahnjúkar	2006	Dam	198 m (650 ft)	
4	NRTF Grindavík (mast 2)		Grindavík	1983	Guyed mast	182.88 m (600.0 ft)	Used for military LF transmission
5	Jórvík Fjarskiptastöð		Selfoss	1997	Lattice mast	52 m (171 ft)	Television (DVB), FM radio and cellular.
6	Úlfarsfell TV, radio and telecom tower		Mosfellsbær	2020	Lattice mast	50 m (160 ft)	Main transmitter site for the Reykjavík area for television (DVB), FM radio and cellular. Replaced Vatnsendi site. Constructed jointly by RÚV and Vodafone. 345 m (1,132 ft) above sea level.
7	Telecom tower, Hvolsvöllur		Hvolsvöllur	1976	Lattice mast	45 m (148 ft)	Originally erected in 1967 at Hraunhóll, Vík. Moved to current location for Iceland Telecom's microwave transmission network in 1976.
8	Telecom tower, Selfoss		Selfoss	1966	Monopole mast	40 m (130 ft)	Originally constructed for Iceland Telecom's microwave transmission network.

=== Demolished ===
This section lists nonbuilding structures in Iceland at least 70 metres (230 ft) in height that have since been demolished.

Was the tallest structure in Iceland upon completion

Rank	Name	Image	City	Year constructed	Year demolished	Structure type	Height	Notes
1	NRTF Grindavík (former mast 1)		Grindavík		1993	Guyed mast	243.8 m (800 ft)	Used for military LF transmission; dismantled in 1993.
2	Eiðar longwave transmitter (third)		Eiðar, East Iceland	1999	2023	Guyed mast	221 m (725 ft)	Used since 18 November 1999 for longwave radio broadcasting on 207 kHz, demolished in 2023.
3	LORAN-C mast Hellissandur		Hellissandur	1959	1963	Guyed mast	190 m (620 ft)	Insulated against ground; used for LORAN-C transmission, until the 412 m (1,352 ft) mast at Hellissandur was built in 1963, being then dismantled.
4	Longwave radio transmitter, Vatnsendahæð		Vatnsendahæð, Vatnsendi, Kópavogur	1930	1991	Double-guyed masts	150 m (490 ft)	RÚV's first longwave radio facility. Two masts, forming a T-antenna. In 1991 the north mast collapsed in a storm. Subsequently, the south mast was demolished.
5	Telegraph Station in Melarnir		Vesturbær, Reykjavík	1918	1953	Double-guyed masts	77 m (253 ft)	First wireless telegraphy station in Iceland. Used for international telegraph services and ship-to-shore comms. Demolished in 1953 due to proximity to Reykjavík Airport.
6	Eiðar longwave transmitter (second)		Eiðar, East Iceland	1951/1956	1998	Double-guyed masts	75 m (246 ft)	Built in 1951 for medium wave AM broadcasts, replacing earlier 25 m (82 ft) masts. Second mast added in 1956 and converted to longwave transmissions. Demolished in 1998 and replaced by taller single mast (see above).
7	(Temporary) Longwave transmitter, Vatnsendahæð		Vatnsendahæð, Vatnsendi, Kópavogur	1991	2021	Double-guyed masts	71 m (233 ft)	Requisitioned from Iceland Telecom as a temporary solution for longwave broadcasts. Two masts forming a T-antenna. LW broadcasts ceased in 1997, and was demolished in 2021.
