= Norðurturninn =

Coordinates: 64°06′04″N 21°53′03″W

Norðurturninn (Icelandic pronunciation: [ˈnɔrðʏrˌtʰʏ(r)tnɪn], "the north tower"), is an office and retail building in Iceland completed in 2016. Norðurturninn is located in downtown Kópavogur, next to Smáratorg Tower and is connected to the shopping mall, Smáralind. Norðurturninn has 15 floors with a height of 62 metres (205 ft) at its completion. However, original proposals were for the building to have a height of 110 metres with 28 floors. Construction of the tower began in 2007 but was on hold due to the 2008–2011 Icelandic financial crisis, until the resumption of construction on the 1 April 2015. It was completed in 2016 and as of 2022, houses Íslandsbanki (headquarters), Controlant, Annata and other companies. The ground floor houses an Íslandsbanki bank branch as well as other smaller retail units.

== See also ==
- List of tallest buildings in Iceland
