= Telegraph Station in Melarnir =

- Loftskeytastöðin á Melunum
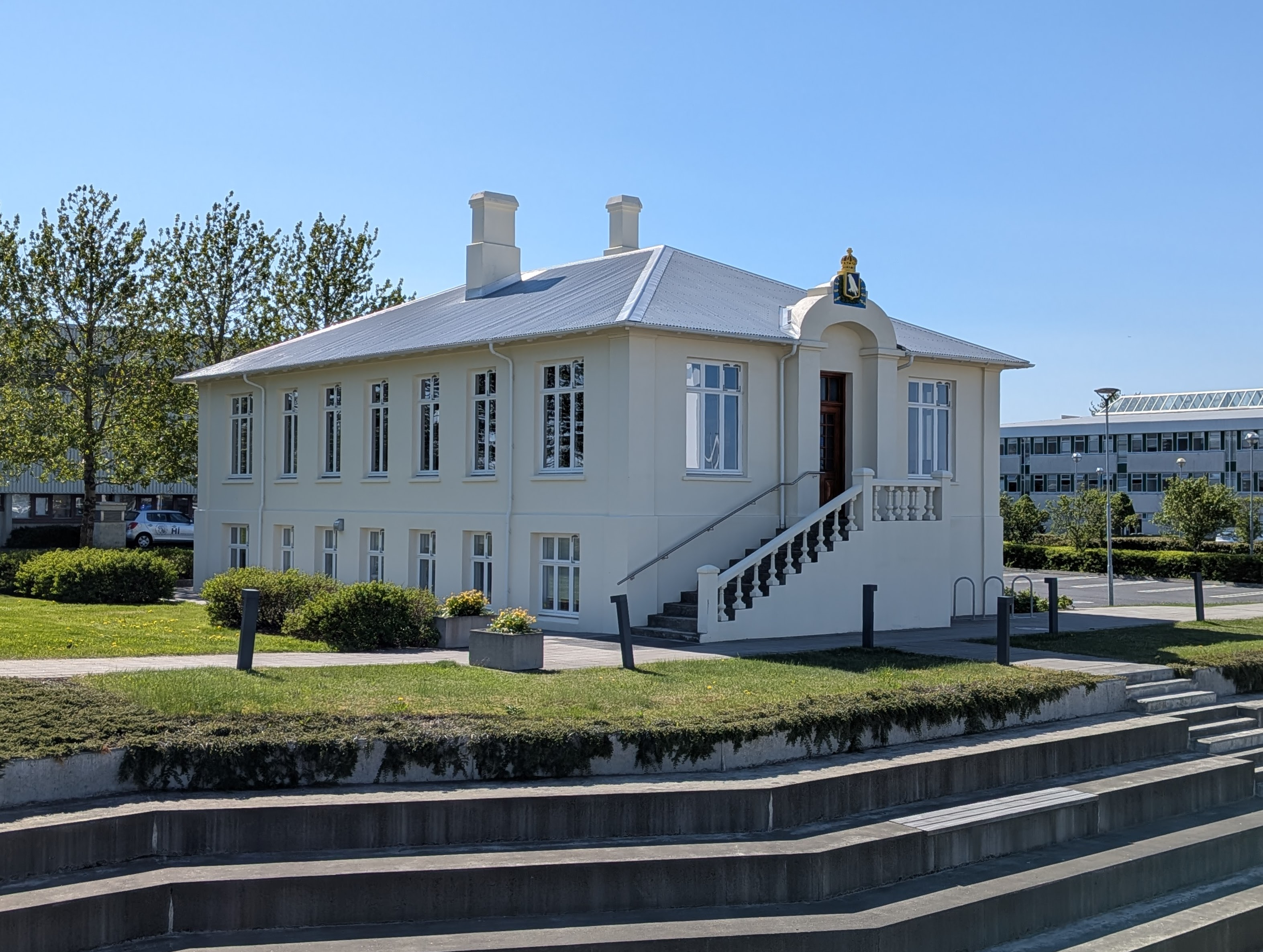
- The former telegraph station in May 2025.

General information
- Address: Brynjólfsgata 5
- Town or city: Reykjavík
- Country: Iceland
- Coordinates: 64°08′22″N 21°57′11″W
- Completed: 1915
- Opened: 17 June 1918
- Owner: University of Iceland
- Height: Masts: 77 metres

Design and construction
- Architect(s): Einar Erlendsson

The Telegraph Station in Melarnir (Icelandic: Loftskeytastöðin á Melunum) is a former wireless telegraphy station in Reykjavík, which operated between 1918 and 1963. The station was the first of its kind in the country, transmitting using two 77-metre-tall (253 ft) masts.

It became a listed building in 2015. Since 2024, it has served as a cultural centre housing exhibitions and events, run by the University of Iceland.

== History ==
The station's main building began construction in 1916; by July of the same year, the Minister for Iceland Einar Arnórsson signed a deal with the British Marconi Company to raise a wireless telegraphy station in Melarnir, Reykjavík. The station building was designed by architect Einar Erlendsson. The Telegraph Station in Melarnir formally began operations on June 17, 1918, transmitting as Reykjavík Radíó. Its initial call sign was OXR, but this was later changed to TFA in late 1919, when Iceland was obtained its own ITU prefix, TF. The initial broadcasting power was 5 kW, powered by a 15 horsepower diesel engine, as grid electricity did not arrive until 1921.

Initially, the telegraph station was intended as a backup connection with overseas countries in case that the submarine telegraph cable, built in 1906, failed. However, the station's primary role quickly became ship-to-shore service, substantially enhancing maritime safety in Iceland. As a result, wireless telegraphy equipment became more commonplace on Icelandic ships.

Iceland's first radio station began broadcasts from the site in Melarnir in 1926. A private undertaking, H.f. Útvarp, was given permission by the government to operate a radio station. By 1928, the radio station faced financial difficulties and closed. Two years later, RÚV (the Icelandic State Broadcaster) was established at a new broadcasting site in Vatnsendahæð.

Friðbjörn Aðalsteinsson became the telegraph station's first director, having studied telegraphy at Bergen Radio in Norway. The station was fitted with a T-antenna supported by two 77-metre-tall (253 ft) guyed masts, being able to transmit up to 750 kilometres in daylight—an equivalent to the distance from Iceland to the Faroe Islands. During nighttime the station could transmit up to 1,500 kilometres. The masts were the tallest structure in Iceland from its construction until 1930, when RÚV's radio masts were erected.

In 1953, as a result of increased interference from industrial activities in Reykjavík and its close proximity to Reykjavík Airport, the antenna masts in Melarnir were taken down and moved to Rjúpnahæð. Transmissions continued to be controlled from the telegraph station building in Melarnir. Ultimately, the Telegraph Station in Melarnir was completely closed in 1963, transferring its operations to a station in Gufunes.

=== Use after closure ===
The University of Iceland took over the building after the closure of the telegraph station, first used by the Faculty of Physical Sciences. The university renovated the building in 1978. In 1996, Síminn (then Póstur og Sími, Iceland Post and Telecom), bought back the building to house the Icelandic Telecommunications Museum, which opened in 1998.

On 1 March 2005, the building was donated by Síminn to the National Museum of Iceland. The Icelandic Telecommunications Museum was closed in 2012 and its contents donated to the Icelandic Transport Museum in Skógar. In February 2015, ownership of the building was again transferred to the University of Iceland. The Icelandic Museum of Natural History leased the building for use as an office and for occasional exhibitions from 2010 until 2020, when indoor mould was discovered in the building.

In 2024, the building was reopened as a cultural centre, after a 250 million ISK renovation. It houses exhibitions and cultural events, run by the University of Iceland.

== Gallery ==
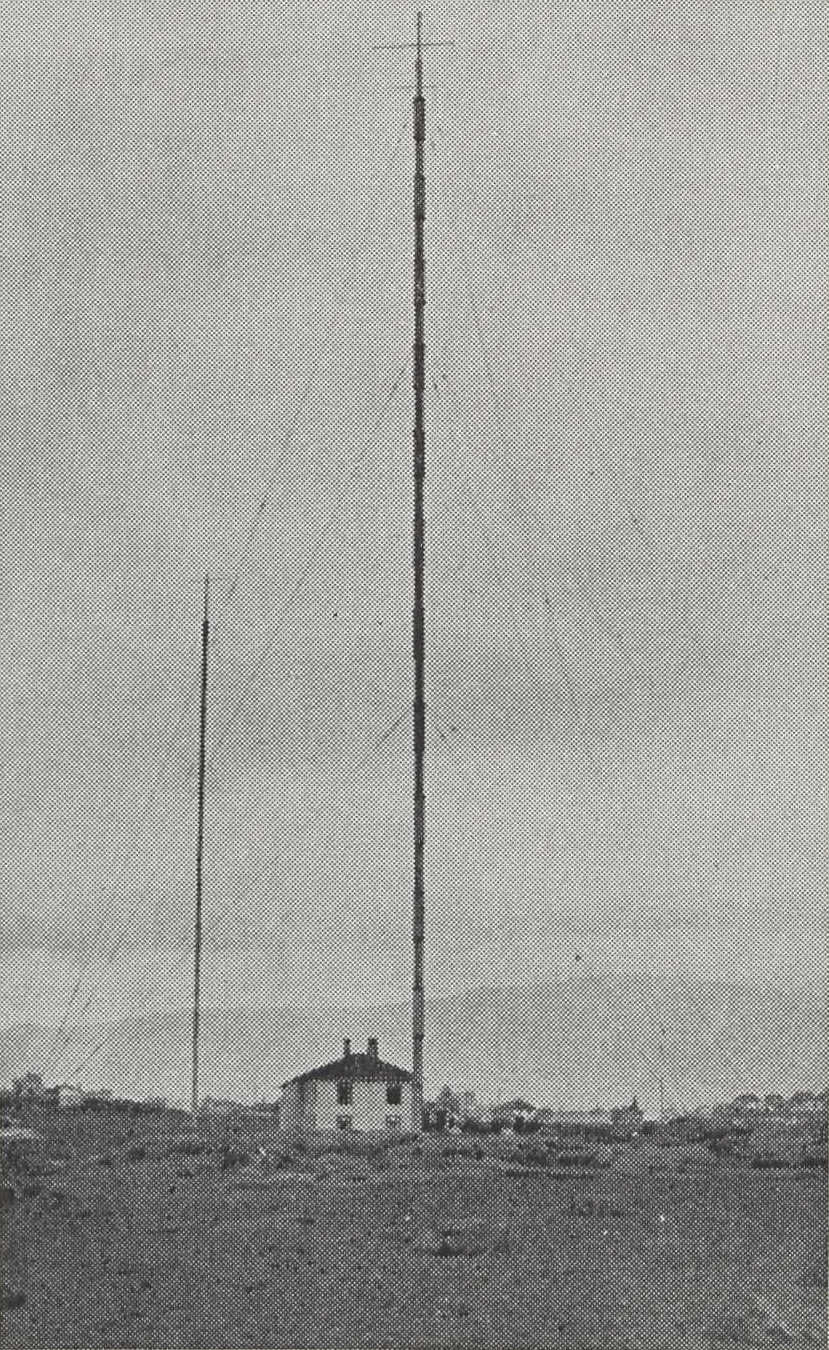
The telegraph station in 1918.

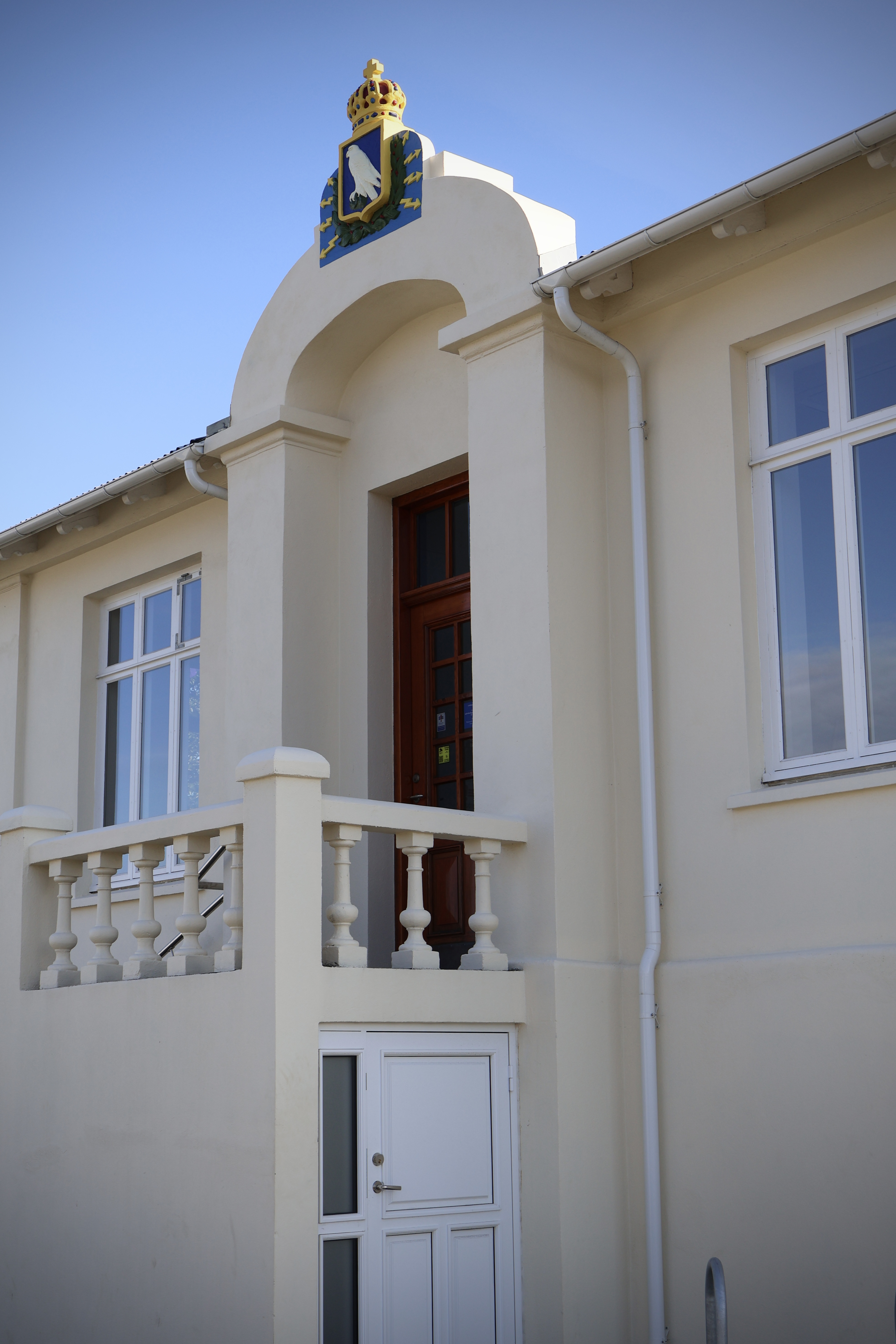
Entrance of the former telegraph station, 2024.
