= Smáratorg Tower =

Coordinates: 64°06′10″N 21°52′50″W

- The Smáratorg Tower
- Interactive map of the Smáratorg Tower area

General information
- Status: Completed
- Type: Office
- Location: Kópavogur, Iceland
- Current tenants: Deloitte
- Construction started: 2003
- Completed: 2007
- Opened: 2008

Height
- Height: 77.6 m (255 ft)

Technical details
- Floor count: 20

Smáratorg 3 (Icelandic pronunciation: [ˈsmauːraˌtʰɔrk]) is an office and retail building in Iceland. It is the tallest building in Iceland, surpassing Hallgrímskirkja in height, and is the fourth-tallest architectural structure in the country after the masts of Naval Radio Transmitter Facility in Grindavík and longwave radio mast at Hellissandur (which is the tallest longwave radio mast in the world).

The building is located in Kirkjuvellir 3, Kópavogur, where the shopping mall Smáralind is also located. The building has 20 floors and is 77.6 metres (255 ft) tall. The main constructor for the building was Jáverk. The tower was designed by Arkís architects.

Construction started in 2003 and was completed in 2007. The building opened on 11 February 2008.

== See also ==
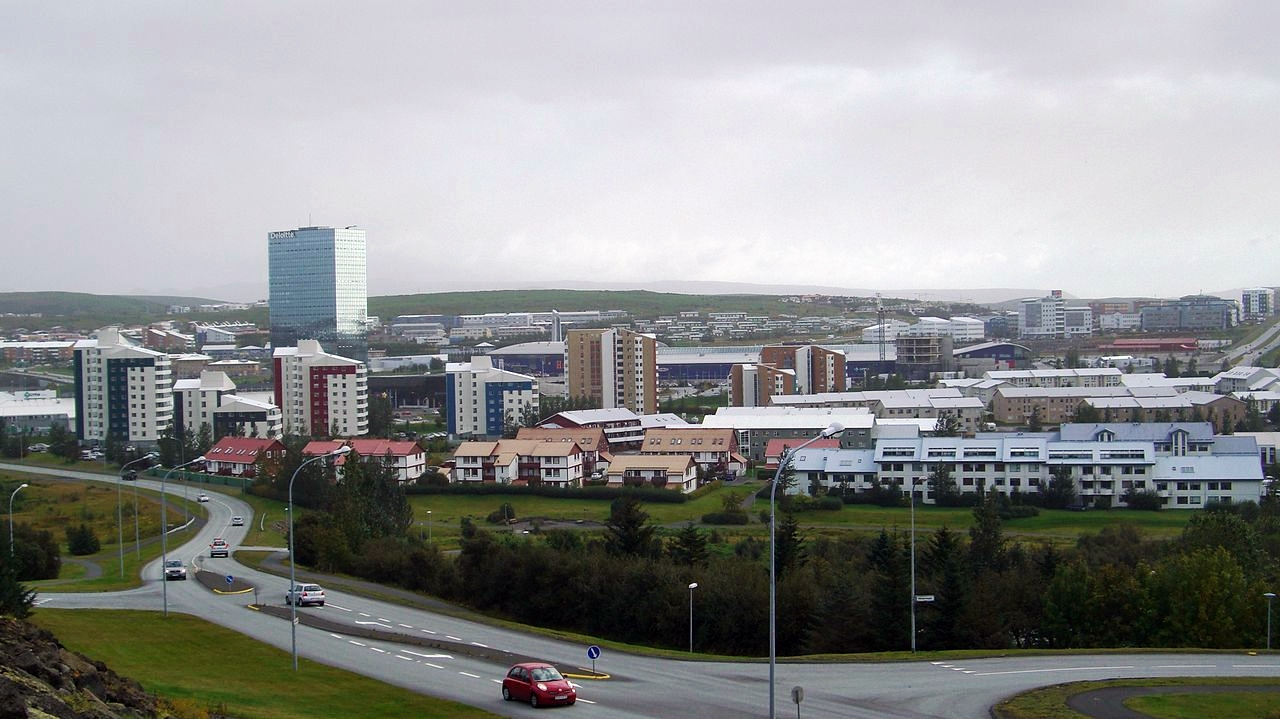
Smáratorg Tower seen from afar

- List of tallest buildings in Iceland
