= Channel 63 =

Channel 63 refers to several television stations:

== United States ==
The following television stations, which are no longer licensed, formerly broadcast on analog channel 63 in the United States:

- W63DB in Williston, Florida
- WMBC-TV in Newton, New Jersey
- WMOR-LP in St. Petersburg, Florida
- WVRN-TV in Richmond, Virginia

== See also ==
- Channel 63 virtual TV stations in the United States
