= List of longwave radio broadcasters =

This is a list of longwave radio broadcasters updated on September 13 2026:

Denotes non-standard frequency (not divisible by 9)

Freq. (kHz)	Station name	Language	Country	Location	Height	Aerial type	Power (kW)	Coordinates	Notes
153	Radio Antena Satelor	Romanian	Romania	Brașov	250m	T-aerial on 2 guyed steel lattice masts, height: 250 metres (820 ft)	200	45°45′22.27″N 25°36′26.77″E; 45°45′13.16″N 25°36′25.15″E	Fifth state-owned radio station in Romania
164	MNB Radio 1	Mongolian	Mongolia	Ulaanbaatar	259m	259 metres (850 ft) tall cable-stayed steel truss mast	250	47°47′54.67″N 107°11′14.7″E	Broadcasts from 22:00 to 15:00 UTC.
209	MNB Radio 1	Mongolian	Mongolia	Choibalsan			40	48°0′17.27″N 114°27′17.6″E	Broadcasts from 22:00 to 15:00 UTC.
209	MNB Radio 1	Mongolian	Mongolia	Dalanzadgad			40	43°31′54.43″N 104°24′41.4″E	Broadcasts from 22:00 to 15:00 UTC.
209	MNB Radio 1	Mongolian	Mongolia	Ölgii			30	48°57′25.0″N 89°58′13.0″E	Broadcasts from 22:00 to 15:00 UTC.
225	Polskie Radio Program I	Polish	Poland	Solec Kujawski	330m	Directional aerial, two guyed radio masts fed on the top, heights 330 metres (1,080 ft) and 289 metres (948 ft)	1,000/700	53°1′21.01″N 18°15′32.63″E; 53°1′12.83″N 18°15′44.06″E	Earlier Konstantynów was used (52°22′3.91″N 19°48′7.04″E).
227	MNB Radio 1	Mongolian	Mongolia	Altai City		Cable-stayed steel truss mast	40	46°19′25.52″N 96°15′31.2″E	Broadcasts from 22:00 to 15:00 UTC.
252	Alger Chaîne 3	French	Algeria	Tipaza	335m	Omnidirectional aerial, single guyed lattice steel mast, height 355 metres (1,165 ft)	1,500/750	36°33′58.14″N 2°28′50.3″E	Intermittent

== List of stations that have closed or are inactive ==
Freq. (kHz)	Station name	Country	Location	Aerial type	Power (kW)	Coordinates
153	Alger Chaîne 1	Algeria	Kenadsa	Three 357 metres (1,171 ft) tall guyed masts	2,000	31°34′12.1″N 2°20′42.1″W
153	Deutschlandfunk	Germany	Donebach	Directional aerial, two guyed steel lattice masts, 363 m high, fed at the top	500	49°33′40.25″N 9°10′22.76″E; 49°33′33.53″N 9°10′50.82″E
153	YuFM	Russia	Taldom transmitter	Omnidirectional aerial, guyed steel lattice mast of 257 m height	300	56°45′30.04″N 37°37′12.17″E
153	NRK P1/P2	Norway	Ingøy	Omnidirectional aerial, guyed steel lattice mast 352 metres (1,155 ft) tall, fed at the top, ex-Omega equipment	100	71°4′17″N 24°5′14″E
153	Radio Rossii	Russia	Popova near Komsomolsk-na-Amure		1,200	50°39′16.75″N 136°54′46.9″E
162	TRT Radyo 4	Turkey	Ağrı	Two guyed lattice steel masts, height 250 m	1,000	39°46′23.11″N 43°2′14.55″E; 39°46′25.86″N 43°2′33.32″E
162	France Inter	France	Allouis	Special cage aerial, height 308 m	250	47°10′10.2″N 2°12′16.56″E
162	Radio Rossii	Russia	Norilsk	Omnidirectional antenna, 205 m high antenna	150	69°24′11″N 87°5′33″E
162	Radio Yuldash, Radio Rossii	Russia	Ufa		150	54°46′19.73″N 56°0′17.02″E
171	Médi 1	Morocco	Nador	Directional aerial consisting of three guyed steel lattice masts, 380 metres (1,250 ft) tall	2,000	35°2′50.65″N 2°55′22.81″W; 35°2′30.27″N 2°55′16.16″W; 35°2′9.89″N 2°55′9.52″W
171	Radio Rossii	Russia	Bolshakovo near Kaliningrad	Omnidirectional antenna, 257 m high guyed lattice steel mast with cage antenna (ARRT-antenna)	600	54°54′42.62″N 21°43′2.32″E
171	Radio Ukraine 1	Ukraine	Krasne near Lviv	Omnidirectional antenna, 259 m high guyed lattice steel mast with cage antenna (ARRT-antenna)	150/75	49°54′12.85″N 24°41′15.22″E
171	Radio Rossii	Russia	Raduga	Omnidirectional antenna, 255 m high guyed lattice steel mast with cage antenna ( ARRT-antenna)	250	55°29′16″N 83°41′28″E
171	Radio 1	Russia	Murmansk	Omnidirectional antenna, 257 m high guyed lattice steel mast with cage antenna ( ARRT-antenna)	150	69°0′59.07″N 32°55′57.17″E
171	Radio 1	Russia	Noginsk	Omnidirectional antenna, 242 m high guyed lattice steel mast with cage antenna ( ARRT-antenna)	150	55°50′0.89″N 38°20′35.18″E
171	Radio 1	Russia	Ezhva near Syktyvkar	Omnidirectional antenna, 257 m high guyed lattice steel mast with cage antenna ( ARRT-antenna)	150	61°49′9.34″N 50°41′26.42″E
171	Radio Rossii	Russia	Tulagino near Yakutsk	Omnidirectional antenna, circle antenna with 1 central and 6 ring masts	150	62°14′15.01″N 129°48′10.4″E ; 62°14′22.82″N 129°48′0.85″E ; 62°14′15.06″N 129°47′51.2″E ; 62°14′7.27″N 129°48′0.82″E ; 62°14′7.31″N 129°48′20″E ; 62°14′15.06″N 129°48′29.7″E ; 62°14′22.82″N 129°48′20″E
177	Deutschlandradio Kultur	Germany	Zehlendorf near Oranienburg	Omnidirectional aerial, cage aerial mounted on 359.7 m high guyed mast, triangle aerial on 3 150 m high guyed steel lattice masts	500	52°47′41.87″N 13°23′9.5″E
180	TRT Radyo 1	Turkey	Polatli	Omnidirectional antenna, 250 m high guyed latice steel mast	1,200	39°45′22.46″N 32°25′6.24″E
180	Radio Rossii	Russia	Yelizovo near Petropavlovsk-Kamchatskiy	Omnidirectional antenna, 255 m high guyed lattice steel mast	150	53°11′4.92″N 158°24′2.24″E
180	Radio Mayak	Russia	Kruchina near Chita	Omnidirectional antenna, 200 m high guyed lattice steel mast	150	51°50′22.5″N 113°44′8.9″E
183	Europe 1	Germany	Felsberg-Berus	Directional aerial, four ground insulated steel lattice masts 270 metres (890 ft), 276 metres (906 ft), 280 metres (920 ft) and 282 metres (925 ft) tall; spare aerial: two ground insulated steel lattice masts, height: 234 metres (768 ft)	750	Main antenna: 49°17′4.2″N 6°40′57.73″E; 49°16′55.86″N 6°40′46.16″E; 49°16′47.55″N 6°40′34.48″E; 49°16′39.18″N 6°40′22.72″E; Spare antenna: 49°17′8.93″N 6°39′31.71″E; 49°17′1.54″N 6°39′23.6″E
189	Rai Radio 1	Italy	Caltanissetta	Omnidirectional aerial, guyed steel lattice mast, height 282 m	10	37°29′53.05″N 14°4′4.08″E
189	Sveriges Radio P1	Sweden	Orlunda, near Motala		300	58°25′37″N 14°58′38″E
189	Radio Rossii	Russia	Kostantinogradovka near Blagoveshchensk	Omnidirectional aerial, 257 m high guyed lattice steel mast with cage antenna ( ARRT-antenna)	1,200	50°30′23.58″N 128°18′32.9″E
189	Sakartvelos Radio	Georgia	Dusheti		250	42°3′1.76″N 44°40′37.56″E
189	RÚV Rás 1 RÚV Rás 2	Iceland	Gufuskalar near Hellissandur	Slight oval bi-directivity aerial, top loaded parallel connected triangular loops, mast as a common member, all guys insulated except two radiating diametrically opposed grounded top guys, loops closed by copper straps in the ground from two conducting guy grounding points to base of the guyed steel lattice mast insulated against ground, height: 412 metres (1,352 ft)	300	64°54′26″N 23°55′19.5″W
198	Alger Chaîne 1	Algeria	Berkaoui	Three guyed directional mast	2,000	31°55′24″N 5°4′32″E
198	Polskie Radio Parlament/Radio Polonia	Poland	Raszyn	Omnidirectional aerial, guyed steel lattice mast insulated against ground, 335 m high	200	52°4′21.72″N 20°53′2.15″E
198	Radio Mayak	Russia	Saint Petersburg – Olgino	Omnidirectional aerial, 205 m high guyed steel lattice mast	150	59°59′30.01″N 30°7′38.81″E
198	Radio Mayak	Russia	Angarsk	Before 2001: T-antenna spun between 2 205 m tall guyed steel lattice mast	250	52°31′51.95″N 103°52′9.46″E, possibly 52°26′10.17″N 103°41′1.05″E
198	Radio Mayak	Russia	Avsyunino	Omnidirectional antenna, 257 m high guyed lattice steel mast with cage antenna ( ARRT-antenna)	150	55°35′13.75″N 39°9′57.84″E
198	Radio Mayak	Russia	Ufa		150	54°46′19.73″N 56°0′17.02″E
198	Radio 1	Kyrgyzstan	Krasnaya Rechka near Bishkek		150	42°52′51.9″N 74°59′43.79″E
198	(1934-1939); BBC National Programme (200 kHz) (1939-1945); BBC European Service (200 kHz) (1945-1967); BBC Light Programme (200 kHz) (1967-1978); BBC Radio 2 (200 kHz) (1978-2026); BBC Radio 4 (200 kHz until 1988, then 198 kHz) (Note: Broadcast at 200khz until 1988) (BBC World Service overnight)	United Kingdom	Droitwich (SFN)	T-aerial on two guyed steel lattice masts insulated against ground with a height of 213 metres (699 ft)	500	52°17′46.9″N 2°6′24.32″W; 52°17′40.4″N 2°6′20.62″W
198	(1934-1939); BBC National Programme (200 kHz) (1939-1945); BBC European Service (200 kHz) (1945-1967); BBC Light Programme (200 kHz) (1967-1978); BBC Radio 2 (200 kHz) (1978-2026); BBC Radio 4 (200 kHz until 1988, then 198 kHz) (BBC World Service overnight)	United Kingdom	Burghead (SFN)	Omnidirectional aerial, guyed steel lattice mast, height 154 metres (505 ft)	50	57°41′57.9″N 3°28′4.78″W
198	(1934-1939); BBC National Programme (200 kHz) (1939-1945); BBC European Service (200 kHz) (1945-1967); BBC Light Programme (200 kHz) (1967-1978); BBC Radio 2 (200 kHz) (1978-2026); BBC Radio 4 (200 kHz until 1988, then 198 kHz) (BBC World Service overnight)	United Kingdom	Westerglen (SFN)	Omnidirectional aerial, guyed steel lattice mast, height 152 metres (499 ft)	50	55°58′33″N 3°48′58.8″W
207	Radio Ukraine 1	Ukraine	Brovary	Omnidirectional antenna, 259.6 m high guyed lattice steel mast with cage antenna ( ARRT-antenna)	600	50°29′48.8″N 30°48′9.2″E
207	Radio al-Urdunniya	Jordan	Al Karanah		?	31°45′55.47″N 36°28′44.97″E; 31°45′29.66″N 36°28′59.11″E
207	SNRT Al-Idaa Al-Watania	Morocco	Azilal Demnate	304.8 metres (1,000 ft) tall guyed mast	400	31°53′54.0″N 6°33′18.0″W
207	Radio Mayak	Russia	Tynda	Omnidirectional aerial, steel lattice mast insulated against ground, height 244 m	150	55°5′19.31″N 124°43′9.7″E
207	Deutschlandfunk	Germany	Aholming	Directional aerial, two guyed steel lattice masts, 265 m high, fed at the top	500	48°43′50.55″N 12°55′47.04″E; 48°43′38.46″N 12°56′2.06″E
216	Radio Monte Carlo Info	France	Roumoules	Directional aerial, three 300 metres (980 ft) high guyed steel lattice masts, 330 metres (1,080 ft) high guyed steel lattice mast as backup aerial	700 / 1400	43°47′41.45″N 6°8′48.41″E; 43°47′34.56″N 6°8′59.09″E; 43°47′27.7″N 6°9′9.85″E, Backup antenna: 43°47′36.29″N 6°9′30.61″E
216	Radio Rossii	Russia	Krasnoyarsk	Omnidirectional antenna, guyed lattice steel mast, 210 m tall	150	56°2′2.97″N 92°45′32.31″E
216	Radio Rossii	Russia	Atamanovka	Directional antenna	150	51°50′2″N 113°43′10″E
216	Radio Rossii	Russia	Birobidzhan	2 guyed masts, 260 m high	30	48°44′19.37″N 132°48′3.95″E ; 48°44′14.71″N 132°48′32.6″E
225	TRT GAP	Turkey	Van	Omnidirectional antenna, 250 m high guyed lattice steel mast	600	38°35′11.47″N 43°15′59.17″E
225	Radio Rossii	Russia	Surgut	Omnidirectional antenna, 257 m high guyed lattice steel mast with cage antenna ( ARRT-antenna)	1,000	61°23′35″N 72°53′20″E
234	Radio 1	Russia	Krasny Bor transmitter near Sankt-Peterburg	Omnidirectional aerial, 271.5 metres tall guyed mast with cage antenna	1200	59°39′12.32″N 30°41′50.12″E
234	Radio Rossii	Russia	Koskovo near Murmansk	Omnidirectional aerial, 210 m tall guyed mast	250	64°21′35.83″N 41°23′4.01″E
234	Radio 1	Russia	Novosemeykino near Samara	Four 205 metres tall towers insulated against ground arranged in a square	2,000	53°22′59.44″N 50°20′13.84″E ; 53°22′59.53″N 50°20′19.23″E ; 53°22′56.2″N 50°20′13.94″E ; 53°22′56.31″N 50°20′19.32″E
234	Radio Rossii	Russia	Raduzhnyy near Magadan	Omnidirectional aerial, 259 m high guyed lattice steel mast with cage antenna ( ARRT-antenna)	1,000	59°42′51.14″N 150°11′29.9″E
234	Radio Rossii	Russia	Odinsk near Irkutsk	Omnidirectional aerial, 259 m high guyed lattice steel mast with cage antenna ( ARRT-antenna)	500	52°24′57.43″N 103°42′0.29″E
234	Radio 1	Russia	Koskovo near Arkhangelsk	Omnidirectional aerial, 257 m high guyed lattice steel mast with cage antenna ( ARRT-antenna)	500	64°21′50.92″N 41°24′41.8″E
234	RTL	Luxembourg	Beidweiler	Directional aerial, three guyed grounded steel lattice masts, 290 metres (950 ft) high, with vertical cage aerial (demolished on 6 November 2026)	1,500	49°43′42.57″N 6°19′4.29″E; 49°43′49.2″N 6°19′15.02″E; 49°43′55.81″N 6°19′25.67″E; 49°43′0.35″N 6°15′28.9″E; 49°43′6.56″N 6°15′40.27″E; 49°43′12.75″N 6°15′51.44″E
243	DR Langbølge	Denmark	Kalundborg	Semi-directional Alexanderson antenna 153/333 degrees, two grounded 118 metres (387 ft) steel lattice radiating towers with interconnecting top wire capacitance	50	55°40′39.27″N 11°4′8.6″E; 55°40′32.91″N 11°4′14.33″E
243	TRT Radyo 4	Turkey	Erzurum	Omnidirectional antenna, 185 m high guyed lattice steel mast	200	39°59′53.59″N 41°6′40.95″E
243	Radio Rossii	Russia	Razdolnoye near Ussuriysk	Omnidirectional antenna, 259 m high guyed lattice steel mast with cage antenna ( ARRT-antenna)	1,000	43°32′18″N 131°55′46″E
243	Kazakh Radio 2 Shalkar	Kazakhstan	Karaganda	Omnidirectional aerial, guyed steel lattice mast of 254 m height	1,000	49°47′32.45″N 73°1′40.15″E
252	Yle Radio 1	Finland	Lahti		200	60.980137°N 25.644195°E, 60.978747°N 25.649155°E
252	Atlantic 252 and RTÉ Radio 1	Ireland	Clarkstown	Omnidirectional aerial, guyed steel lattice mast, insulated against ground, height 248 metres (814 ft) Demolished on 27 July 2023	150/60	53°27′46″N 6°40′39″W
252	Radio Rossii	Russia	Kazan	Omnidirectional aerial, 152 m high guyed lattice steel mast with cage antenna ( ARRT-antenna)	100	55°49′6.3″N 49°10′24.64″E
261	Radioropa Info	Germany	Burg	Omnidirectional aerial, cage aerial on 324 m high guyed, grounded steel lattice mast, 210 m high steel tube mast, insulated against ground	200	52°17′12.93″N 11°53′50.52″E
261	Radio Rossii	Russia	Taldom	Omnidirectional antenna, circle antenna with 1 central and 5 ring masts, height of central mast 275 m	2,500	56°43′59.86″N 37°39′47.51″E ; 56°44′10.32″N 37°39′46.53″E ; 56°44′2.54″N 37°39′29.17″E ; 56°43′51.09″N 37°39′37.2″E ; 56°43′51.76″N 37°39′59.6″E ; 56°44′3.64″N 37°40′5.34″E
261	Radio Rossii	Russia	Kruchina near Chita	Omnidirectional antenna, guyed lattice steel mast, 260 m high	150	51°50′22.5″N 113°44′8.9″E
261	Radio Rossii	Russia	Tyumen	Omnidirectional antenna, guyed lattice steel mast, 220 m high	150	
261	Radio Rossii	Russia	Vorkuta	Omnidirectional antenna, guyed lattice steel mast, 220 m high	50	
261	Radio Horizont	Bulgaria	Vakarel	One of the few Blaw-Knox Towers in Europe, 215 m high	75	42°34′35.18″N 23°41′55.52″E
270	Radio Rossii	Russia	Orenburg	Omnidirectional aerial, guyed steel lattice mast of 137 m height	25	51°46′44.37″N 55°6′23.01″E
270	Radio 1	Russia	Khabarovsk	2 guyed steel lattice masts, height: 164 m	150	48°30′43.48″N 135°7′2.24″E ; 48°30′48.75″N 135°7′18.15″E
270	ČRo Radiožurnál	Czech Republic	Topolná	Masts demolished on 28.7.2022, directional aerial (maximum of radiation in east–west direction), two grounded 257 metres (843 ft) high guyed steel lattice mast with cage aerials	50	49°7′32.88″N 17°30′45.97″E; 49°7′18.85″N 17°30′41.78″E
279	Radio Rossii	Russia	Gorno-Altaisk	Omnidirectional antenna, 143m high guyed lattice steel mast	50	51°58′1.12″N 85°54′54.68″E
279	Radio Rossii	Russia	Selenginsk	Omnidirectional aerial, 260 m high guyed lattice steel mast with cage antenna (ARRT-antenna)	150	52°2′17.52″N 106°56′25.6″E
279	Radio Rossii	Russia	Vestochka near Yuzhno-Sakhalinsk	Omnidirectional antenna, guyed lattice steel mast, 258 m high	1,000	46°50′35″N 142°53′44″E
279	Radio Rossii	Russia	Yekaterinburg	Omnidirectional aerial, guyed steel lattice mast of 256 m height, fed at the top	150	56°53′22.46″N 60°41′30.22″E
279	BR Pershy Kanal/BR Radyjo Stalitsa	Belarus	Sasnovy	353.5 metres tall guyed mast	500	53°24′31″N 28°31′57″E
279	TR1 Watan Radio	Turkmenistan	Ashgabat	Cable-stayed steel truss mast	150	37°51′14.89″N 58°21′57.99″E
