= Hvassaleiti =

Neighbourhood of Reykjavík, Iceland

Coordinates: 64°7.5′N 21°52.5′W

Hvassaleiti (Icelandic pronunciation: [ˈkʰvassaˌleiːtɪ]) is a neighbourhood in Reykjavík, the capital of Iceland (103, Reykjavík). Children there used to go to two schools Hvassaleitisskóli (founded in 1966) or Álftamýraskóli (founded in 1964). After their merger, children attend Háaleitisskóli. The shopping centre Austurver is located in Hvassaleiti, and the shopping mall Kringlan is adjacent.
