= Rás 1 =

Icelandic radio station

Rás 1 (Útvarp Reykjavík)
- Iceland
- Frequencies: FM: 93.5 MHz (Reykjavík); FM: Various (Nationwide)
- RDS: RAS 1

Programming
- Language: Icelandic

Ownership
- Owner: RÚV
- Sister stations: Rás 2

History
- First air date: 20 December 1930; 95 years ago
- Former frequencies: LW: 207 kHz (Eiðar site); 189 kHz (Hellissandur site); MW: Variable (select locations); SW

Links
- Website: ruv.is/ras1

Rás 1 ([rauːs'ejtʰ]; Channel 1) is an Icelandic radio station belonging to and operated by Ríkisútvarpið (RÚV), Iceland's national public service broadcaster. Broadcast throughout Iceland on FM (92.4 and 93.5 MHz in Reykjavík), via DTV radio (DVB-T2) and is also streamed on the Internet. It is currently among the country's most listened-to radio stations.

== History ==
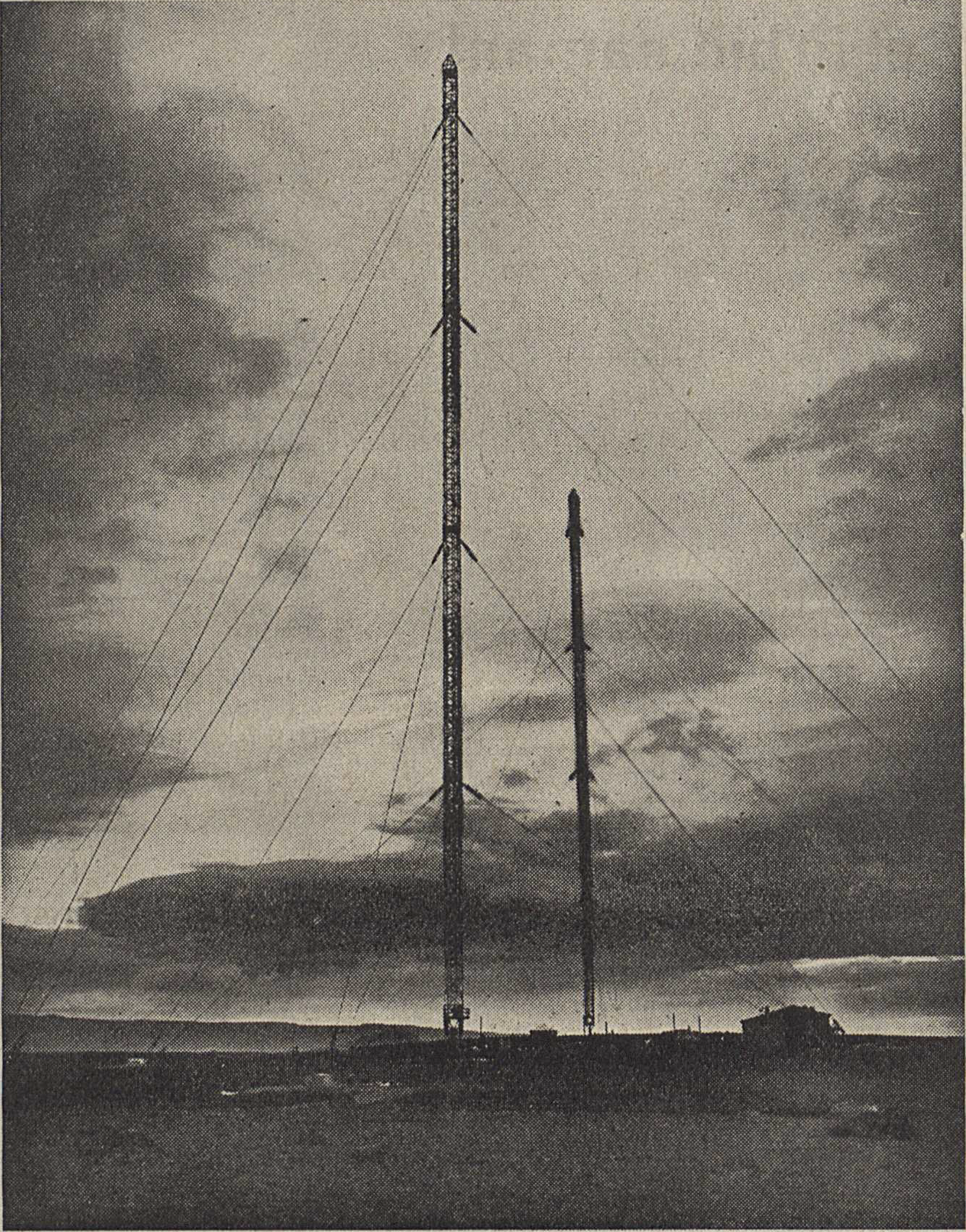
RÚV Longwave transmitter, Vatnsendi built in 1930.

Former logo (2011–2019)

The station began broadcasts on 20 December 1930, using the call-sign Útvarp Reykjavík (Radio Reykjavík). A transmission site was chosen at Vatnsendi (also known as Vatnsendahæð) in Kópavogur, then uninhabited, due to its prominence over Reykjavik as well as its relatively flat land. Two 150-metre-tall (490 ft) steel masts made by Telefunken were erected and a wire strung between them forming a T-antenna.

As was the norm for the time, broadcasts were on AM longwave band, initially at a wavelength of 1200 metres (249.8 kHz) with a power of 16 kW. Marconi transmission equipment was used.

New transmission equipment was acquired in 1935, and in 1938, the transmitted power was increased 100kW. Longwave transmission equipment at the main Vatnsendi site was renewed in 1951 and in 1964.

During the British occupation of Iceland, radio transmissions were tightly censored.

=== Eiðar transmission site and medium wave transmissions ===
Also in 1938, the Eiðar transmission relay site serving the East Iceland was opened, initially at a power of 1 kW using two 25 m masts, at 614 kHz (488 m). In 1951 a taller mast was constructed, 75 m high, and a new 5 kW medium-wave transmitter was installed. In 1966, a second 75 m mast was constructed, and the transmitter was converted to longwave, at a power of 20 kW with the same frequency as the main Vatnsendi site.

Around a dozen small medium-wave relay transmitters were constructed in the 1950s to fill in coverage gaps of the longwave service from Reykjavík, including at Akureyri and Höfn.

=== Transmission frequencies ===
Until the 1960s RÚV's transmission frequency went through many changes, due to interference with other stations in Europe. Below is a list of known frequencies RÚV transmitted at their main Vatnsendi site:

Rás 1 longwave frequencies and power
Date	Wavelength (m)	Frequency (kHz)	Transmission site	Power	Mast height	Remarks
1930-12-20	1200	250	Vatnsendi	16kW	2x 150 m	
1934-01-15	1639	183	Vatnsendi	16kW	2x 150 m	
Spring 1934	1442	208	Vatnsendi	16kW	2x 150 m	
1938-08-01	1442	208	Vatnsendi	100kW	2x 150 m	New transmitter
1941-11-22	1107	271	Vatnsendi	100kW	2x 150 m	
1948-10-26	1648	182	Vatnsendi	100kW	2x 150 m	
1959-12-15	1437	209	Vatnsendi	100kW	2x 150 m	
1960-02-11	1648	182	Vatnsendi	100kW	2x 150 m	
1960-12-15	1435	209	Vatnsendi	100kW	2x 150 m	
1988	1448	207	Vatnsendi	100kW	2x 150 m	
1991-02-03	-	-	Vatnsendi	-	1x 150 m	One mast collapsed during storm Remaining mast felled 3 March 1991.
1991-11	1448	207	Vatnsendi	100kW	2x 70 m	Temporary masts, requisitioned from Iceland Telecom
1997-09-09	1586	189	Hellissandur (Gufuskálar)	300kW	1x 412 m	New site: Hellissandur

==== 1991 Longwave tower collapse ====
On 3 February 1991, one of the original transmission masts at Vatnsendi collapsed during a winter storm. They had been due for replacement since the late 1970s and were in a bad state of repair, however their replacement was never funded. On 3 March 1991, the remaining tower was felled for safety reasons.

Two 70-metre-tall (230 ft) spare masts obtained from Iceland Telecom were erected and temporary longwave transmissions began again in November 1991, albeit with much reduced power with less coverage. These temporary masts were demolished in 2021.

The station adopted its present name on 1 December 1983 when RÚV began transmitting a second radio channel, which is known as Rás 2.

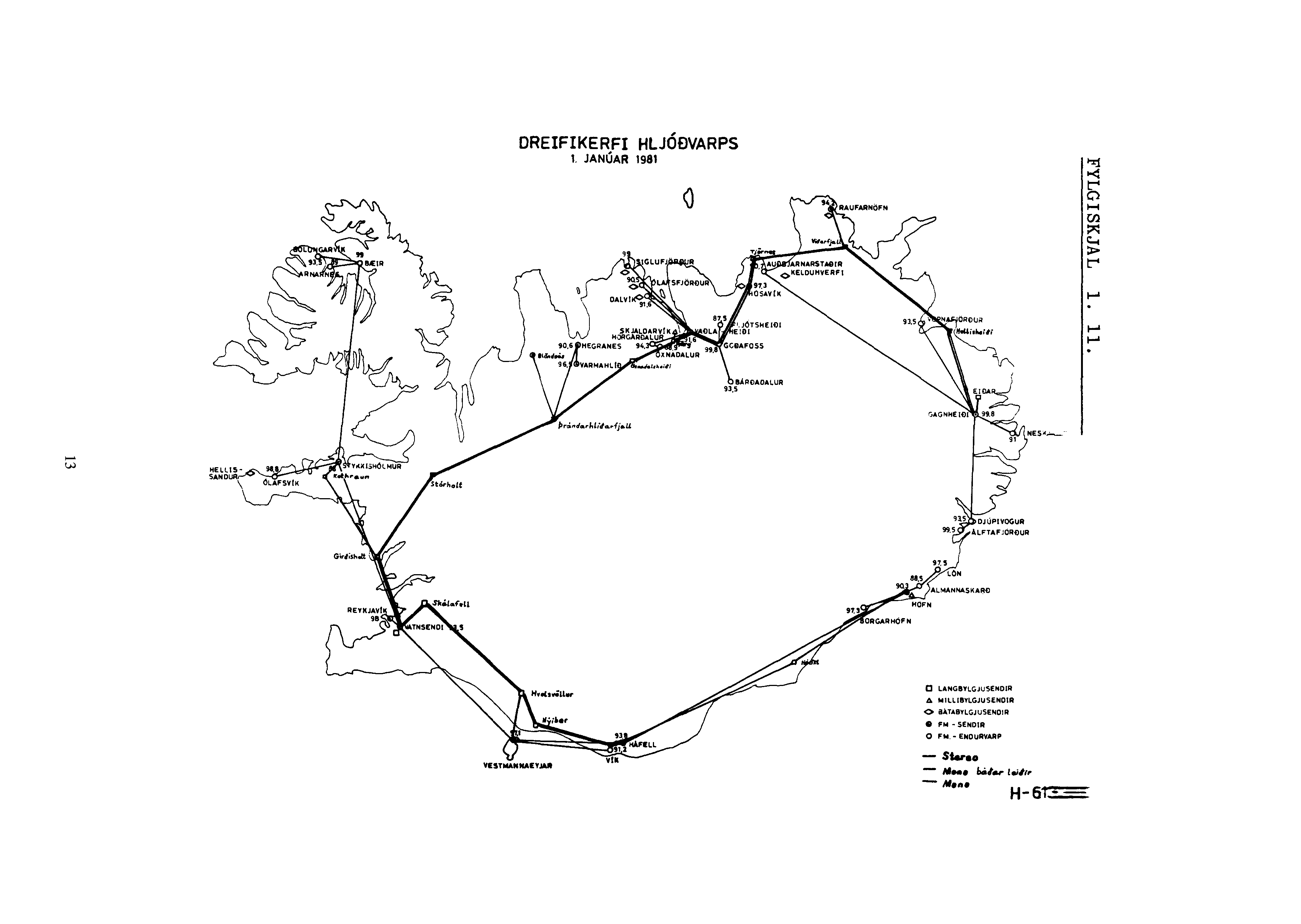
Icelandic radio transmission network in 1981.

==== Longwave reintroduction ====
RÚV's responsibility as public broadcaster and emergency broadcasts were questioned without LW radio. In addition, much of the fishing fleet and rural areas were out of reach by FM radio.

Some questioned the obsolescence and cost of LW radio compared to FM broadcasts which were of better quality and more popular. RÚV took the decision to revamp its longwave service in the 1990s. On 9 September 1997, Hellissandur longwave transmitter began broadcasting at 300 kW at 189 kHz.. Later, in 1999 the reconstructed Eiðar mast was activated at a height of 220 m and its power increased to 100 kW, at 207 kHz. Broadcasts over the new longwave system were split between Rás 1 content and Rás 2 content by schedule since 1999.

==== 2023 Longwave retirement ====
RÚV announced the retirement of its longwave transmissions beginning in 2023, citing its inadequacy as an emergency broadcasting service as most vehicles and radios do not support longwave broadcasts anymore. In 2016, there were test transmissions at low power on the former Höfn frequency of 666 kHz. The aim was to test whether medium wave could be an alternative to long wave, which is not only expensive but also increasingly unreceivable by car radios across Iceland. However, this approach was not pursued further.

In 2023, the Eiðar longwave transmitter was demolished, ceasing 207 kHz transmissions.

The Hellissandur longwave radio mast went off the air on 5 September 2024, ceasing 189 kHz transmissions. Subsequently, on the 17 October 2024, RÚV officially announced that the transmitter would not be returning to service which marked the end of the RÚV longwave service. The Hellissandur mast remains in place.

=== Shortwave and satellite broadcasting ===
Shortwave broadcasts were used for long distance transmission, mostly for seafarers and Icelanders abroad. They began in 1948 and were used intermittently for important broadcasts (e.g. election nights) and regular newscasts. They were sent from the Rjúpnahæð site (mainly used for HF ship-to-shore and air-to-ground communications), adjacent to the Vatnsendi site. Shortwave broadcasts ceased on 1 July 2007, after the introduction of satellite broadcasts.

In May 2007, RÚV began direct satellite TV broadcasts, supplemented by Rás 1 and Rás 2 over satellite DTV radio, in order to service fishing fleets around Iceland and remote areas where the terrestrial network does not reach. Telenor ASA ran the service on Intelsat 10-02, later Thor 5 over DVB-S by contract until it ceased in mid-2025.

=== FM broadcasting ===
FM broadcasting began in 1959 at its main Vatnsendi site, later expanding nationwide. Stereo transmissions began in 1980. An expansion of the FM network was announced with the closure of the longwave service.

Rás 1 is also broadcast over terrestrial DTV radio over DVB-T2, which has been available since the launch of digital television services in 2014.

== Programming ==
Rás 1 carries primarily news, weather, current affairs coverage, and cultural programming dealing with the arts, history, the Icelandic language, literature, and social and environmental issues.

== See also ==
- Bylgjan
- Rás 2
