= Höfðatorg Tower 1 =

General information
- Status: Completed
- Location: Iceland
- Coordinates: 64°8.70′N 21°54.50′W

Height
- Tip: 243 ft (74.1 m)

Design and construction
- Architect(s): PK Arkitektar

Höfðatorg Tower 1 is an office tower in Iceland. The building is located close to downtown Reykjavík. It is 74 metres (243 ft) high and has a total of 19 floors, from the ground up. The tower's construction was completed in 2009. It is a part of a complex called Höfðatorg (Icelandic pronunciation: [ˈhœvðaˌtʰɔrk]).

The name Höfðatorg is taken from the house Höfði, which is very close to the building.

It was designed by architecture studio PK Arkitektar. It is the 3rd tallest building in Iceland, behind the Smáratorg Tower and the Hallgrímskirkja.

== See also ==
- List of tallest buildings in Iceland
