= Rás 2 =

Icelandic national radio station

Programming
- Language: Icelandic

Ownership
- Owner: RÚV
- Sister stations: Rás 1 Rondó

History
- First air date: 1 December 1983; 41 years ago

Links
- Website: www.ruv.is/ras2

Rás 2 (Channel 2) is an Icelandic radio station belonging to the National Icelandic Broadcasting Service, RÚV. Launched on 1 December 1983, it is currently the highest-rated radio station in Iceland, with a schedule composed chiefly of news, current affairs, and pop and rock music.

== Broadcasting ==
Rás 2 is broadcast throughout the country from a network of 90 FM transmitters (99.9 MHz is the channel's main frequency in Reykjavík), via terrestrial DTV radio (DVB-T2) and is also streamed on the Internet. Rás 2 was also previously broadcast over longwave from 1999 to 2024 using an alternating schedule with Rás 1. Broadcasts were also available over digital satellite (DVB-S) on Thor 5 from 2007 to 2025.

== Logos ==
1983 to 2011

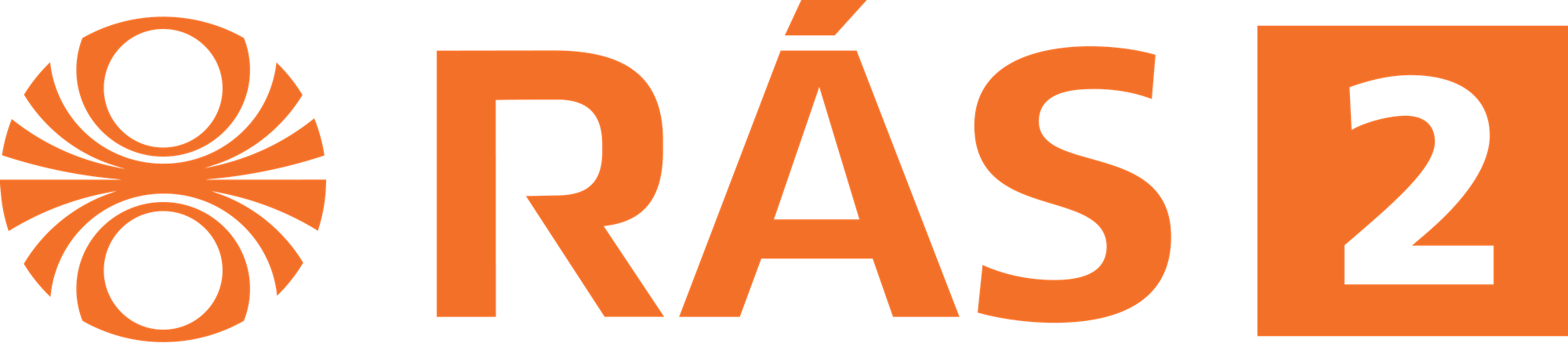
2011 to 2019

== See also ==
- Rás 1
- RÚV
