= House of Commerce =

Coordinates: 64°7′53.05″N 21°53′49.42″W

The House of Commerce (Icelandic: Hús verslunarinnar) is an office tower located at Kringlan 7 near Kringlan shopping mall in Reykjavík, Iceland. The building was constructed from 1975–1981. The building has a 4-based tower structure, the tallest one being approximately 54 meters (177 feet) high.

== See also ==
- List of tallest buildings in Iceland
