= Arkís =

Arkís (Icelandic pronunciation: [ˈarcʰiːs]) is an Icelandic architectural practice based in Reykjavík that has been in operation since 1997. ARKÍS' works and projects span all levels of architecture, planning and design, in addition to green design consultancy. Notable projects include the design of the Smáratorg Tower in Kópavogur (currently the tallest tower in Iceland), Icelandic shipping company Samskip’s headquarters, The Icelandic Institute of Natural History, Snaefellstofa Visitor Center at Vatnajokull National Park and Reykjavík University which was a design collaboration with HLA architects.
