= Channel 63 virtual TV stations in the United States =

The following television stations operate on virtual channel 63 in the United States:

- KBEH in Garden Grove, California
- WBEC-TV in Boca Raton, Florida
- WHSG-TV in Monroe, Georgia
- WIPX-TV in Bloomington, Indiana
- WKTC in Sumter, South Carolina
- WMBC-TV in Newton, New Jersey
- WYTU-LD in Milwaukee, Wisconsin
