= Naval Radio Transmitter Facility Grindavik =

United States Navy facility in Iceland

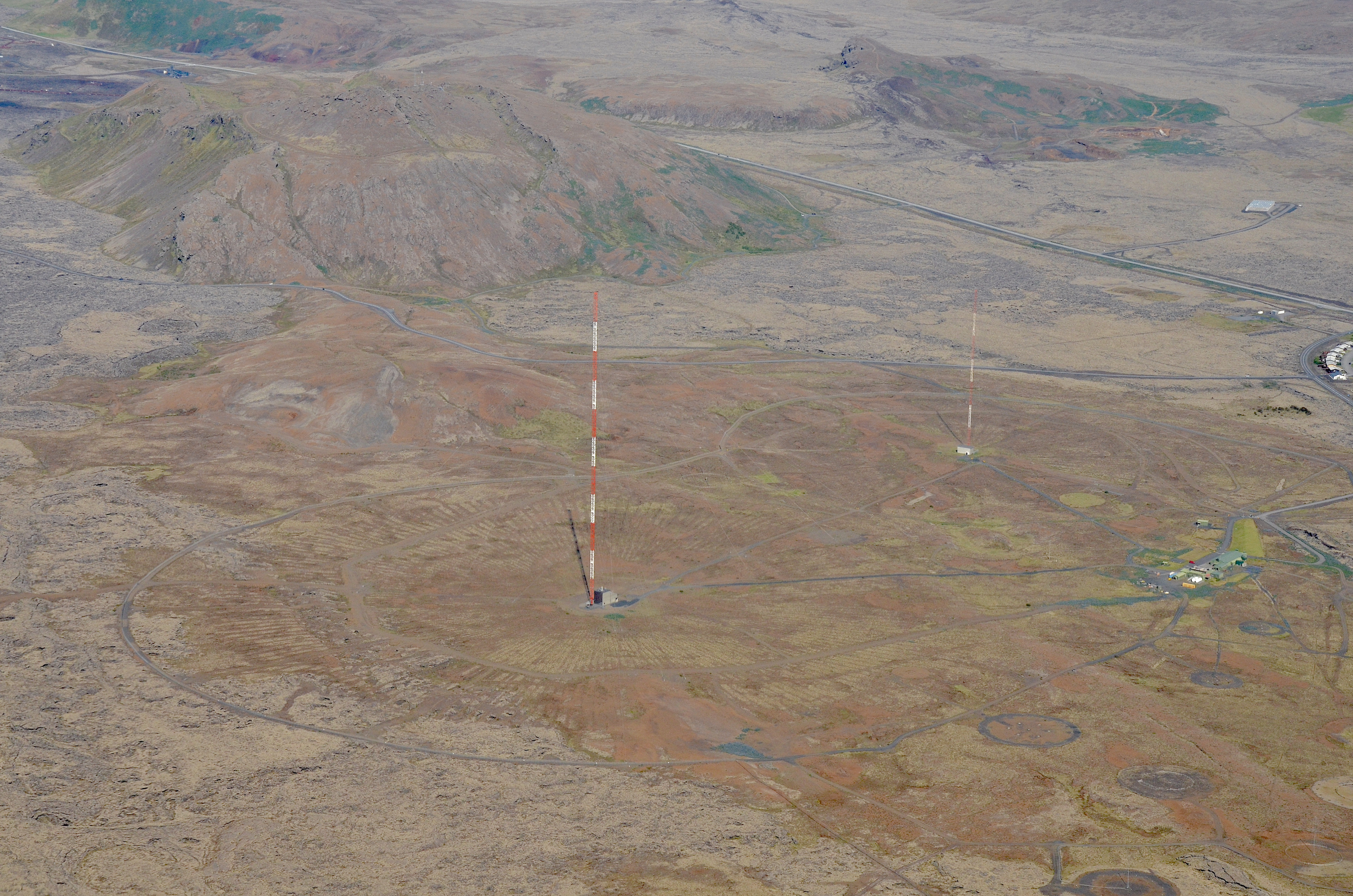
Aerial view of NRTF Grindavik

Naval Radio Transmitter Facility Grindavik (NRTF Grindavik) is a transmission facility of the US Navy at Grindavík, Iceland, maintained by the N62 Division. It is active on shortwave and longwave under the callsign TFK on 37.5 kHz.

== History ==
NRTF Grindavik originally had two towers for its longwave service – the west tower with a height of 243.8 metres (800 ft) and the east tower with a height of 182.9 metres (600 ft) – which were, when built, the tallest man-made objects in Iceland. In 1983, the east tower was replaced by a new tower of the same height. The west tower was replaced by a new 304.8-metre (1,000 ft) guyed mast and 2,500-square-foot (230 m^{2}) helix house, now the second tallest structure in Iceland, after the Hellissandur longwave radio mast.

Before all these improvements were made, in about 1976, the station was tasked to operate its 600 feet (180 m) tower on a very low frequency, much lower than any frequency on which it had ever before been operated. There was some concern about running the shorter tower on such a low frequency, but the 800 feet (240 m) tower was already tasked with a higher priority mission. When the 600 feet (180 m) tower and its helix house were tuned to the desired frequency and the transmitter power output was increased to the required level, the biggest coil in the helix house arced internally and destroyed itself. A limited number of replacement coils were available in the supply system and were, in turn, installed and similarly destroyed. The problem was that the low frequency and the corresponding high reactance needed to resonate the antenna resulted in an abnormally high voltage at the output of the helix house, causing the last and largest coil to arc internally and destroy itself. The solution to the problem was to design and install a different final coil in the helix house with the inductance and physical shape needed to supply the needed reactance without arcing. HQ started the actions necessary to procure such a coil, while the COMSTA CO, CAPT Ralph L Spaulding, a graduate of the Naval Post Graduate School in Communications Engineering, designed a temporary coil with the appropriate characteristics, and the crew at Grindavik built it. The completed coil was about 6 feet (1.8 m) long and 2 feet (61 cm) in diameter, with dry walnut lumber used to make the coil form. The completed coil was set on a wooden chair in the helix house, connected to the original chain of coils (needed to make minor changes in inductance to tune the antenna), and the output port of the helix house. This arrangement worked well, except that an occasional arc between the output port and the copper coated internal wall of the helix house would trip the transmitter off the air. The new coil was received and installed sometime later. It was significantly larger than the wooden coil, designed to just fit through the helix house door. This configuration worked for some time, until an arc occurred at the large feed-through insulator at the output port and destroyed the insulator. This put the antenna down until significant helix house modifications could be made.

NRTF Grindavik was the 1999 winner of the Defense Information Systems Agency (DISA) Outstanding Transmission Facility Award (Category II), and was a runner up in the same category in 1997. The new taller antenna and helix house were structurally designed by Donald W. Anderson, PE who additionally managed the design and construction programs while employed at Naval Facilities Engineering Command (NAVFAC), Atlantic. The final design incorporated many new and improved items which required integrated electronic and structural designs, including a new and improved helix house RF copper shielding design and installation method. All successes in the program improved on former designs and were partially influential in the previously mentioned awards.

NRTF Grindavik Locations (WGS84)
East	63°51′3″N 22°27′6″W
West	63°51′1″N 22°28′0″W

The N62 Division is divided into three subdivision: N62A, Antenna Maintenance; N62B, longwave equipment and Integrated Submarine Automated Broadcast Processing System (ISABPS) Maintenance; and N62C, shortwave equipment and Ancillary Equipment Maintenance.

In 2006, Grindavik was listed as transmitting AFRTS on 7590 kHz and 9980 kHz USB.

In the 2014 edition of Radio Navigational Aids, Publication No. 117, NRTF Grindavik was listed as broadcasting NAVTEX on 490 kHz and 518 kHz using callsign TFK.

In November 2019, the installation formally had a Director appointed to head it, as U.S. Naval Computer and Telecommunications Area Masters Station Atlantic Detachment Grindavik, Iceland (NCTAMS LANT DET GRINDAVIK IC).

In November 2023, Grindavik and the areas around were placed under a state of emergency and evacuated due to the threat of a volcanic eruption.
