= Grand Hótel Reykjavík =

Tallest hotel in Iceland

Coordinates: 64°08′33″N 21°53′23″W

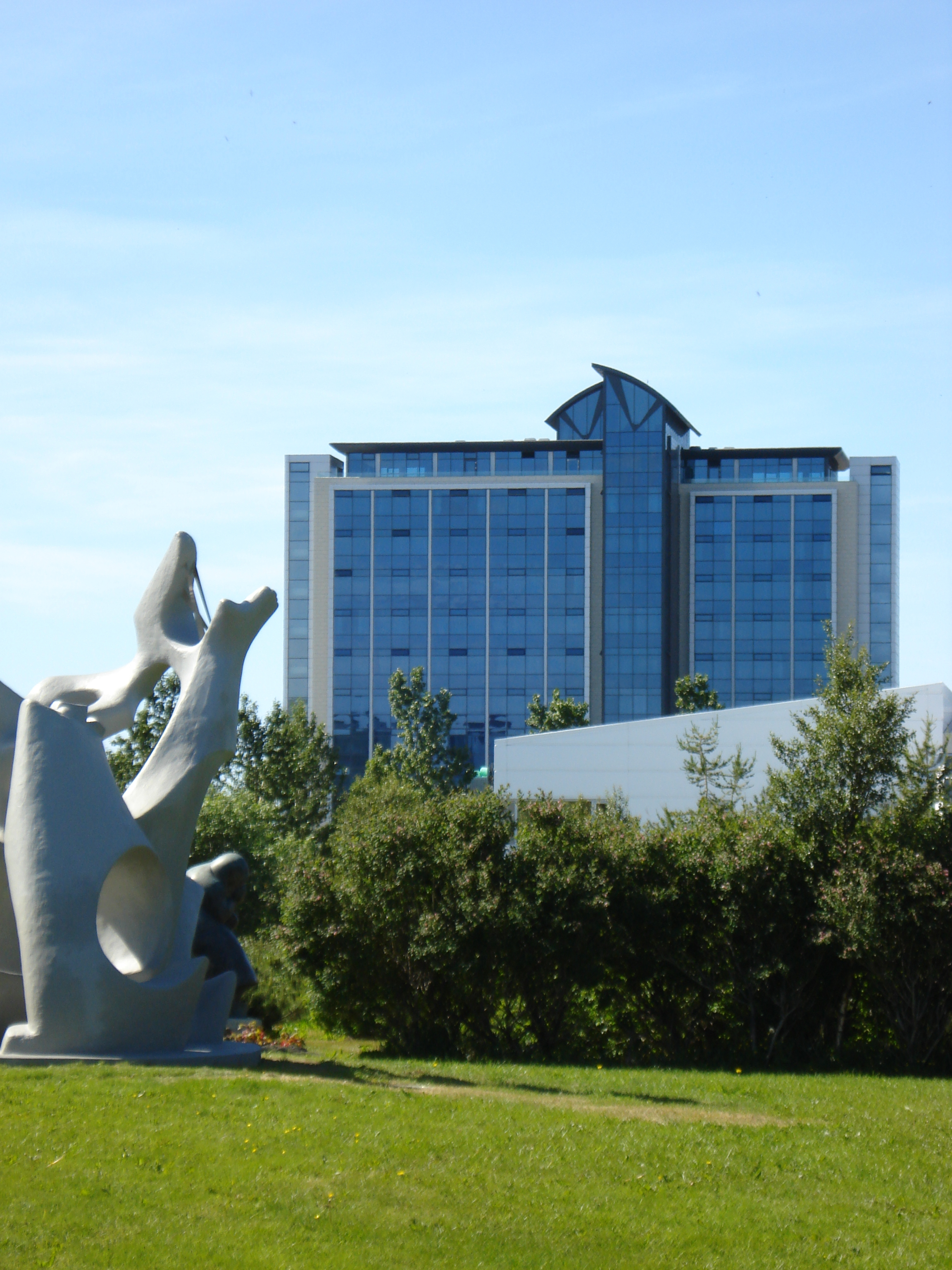
Grand Hótel Reykjavík

Grand Hótel Reykjavík is the tallest hotel in Iceland. It became the tallest when construction of an additional tower was completed in 2007, surpassing the nearby Hilton Reykjavík Nordica Hótel. It has 314 hotel rooms, a restaurant, and a spa. Its height was estimated at 193.57 ft (59 m).

== See also ==
- List of tallest buildings in Iceland
