= Eiðar longwave transmitter =

Transmitter in Eiðar, Iceland (1998–2023)

Coordinates: 65.373036°N 14.340913°W

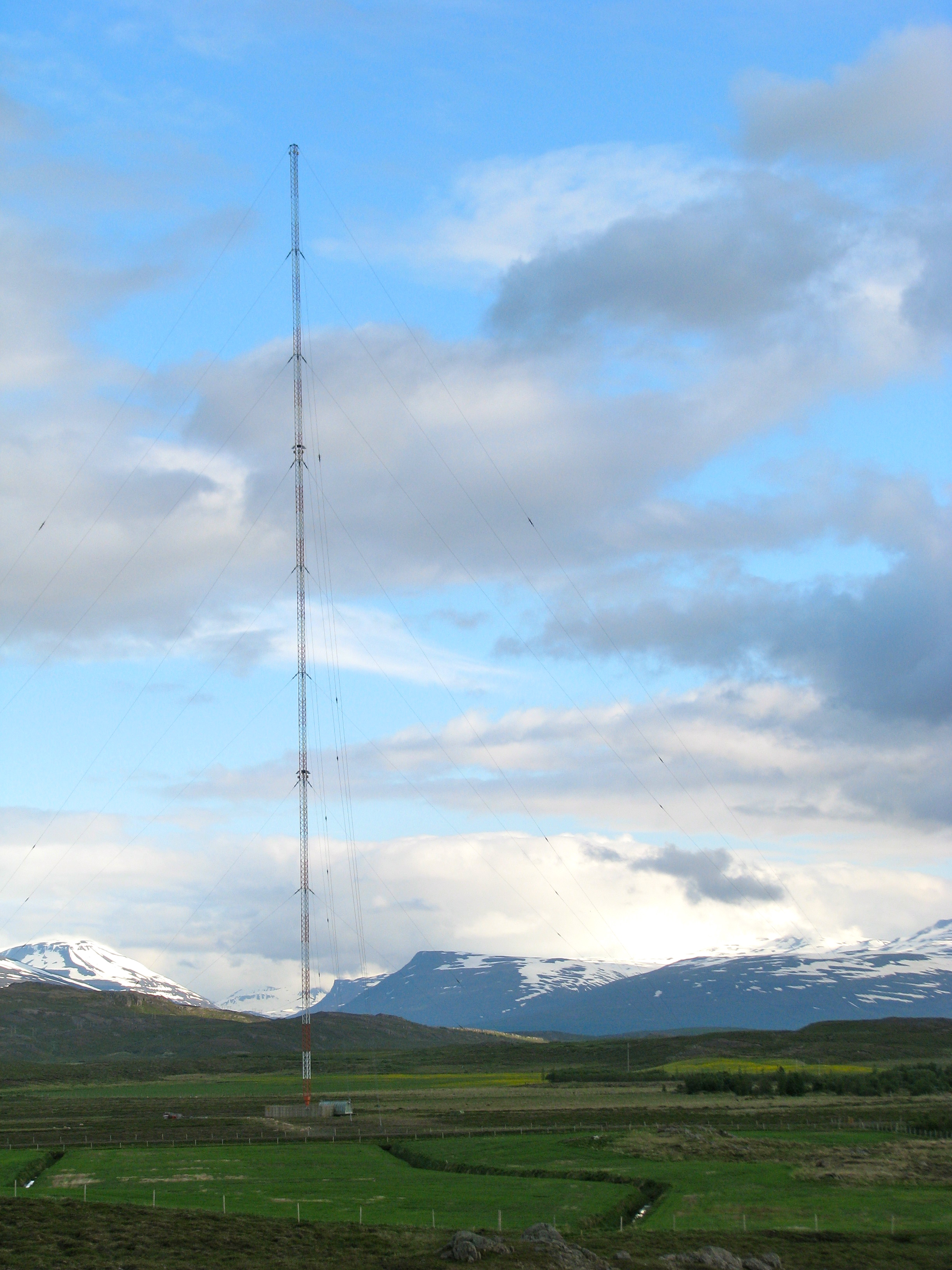
Eiðar longwave transmitter in Eiðar, Eastern Iceland

The Eiðar longwave transmitter was a facility previously used by RÚV (the Icelandic National Broadcasting Service) for longwave radio broadcasting on 207 kHz with a power of 100 kW. The transmitter was situated at Eiðar near Egilsstaðir in East Iceland. It was demolished in March 2023. At the time of its closure, it used an omnidirectional aerial in the form of a 221-metre (725 ft) tall steel lattice mast radiator insulated against the ground. The transmission site was in use from 1938 until its closure in 2023.

Along with the more powerful Hellissandur longwave transmitter, it formed RÚV's longwave service. It was intended to fill in gaps of the FM radio, serve seafarers and act as a critical communications facility.

== History ==
The first transmission towers at Eiðar were built in 1938, consisting of two 25 m (82 ft) masts forming a T-antenna. Eiðar first broadcast on medium-wave, with a power of 1 kW. This was later increased to 5 kW with new equipment in 1950. In 1951, the original towers were demolished and replaced with a single 75 m (246 ft) tall mast. In 1966, a second 75m mast was erected, forming a T-antenna, and the transmitter was converted to longwave, at a power of 20 kW.

In 1998, the mast was again reconstructed at a height of 221 m (725 ft) and its power increased to 100 kW. Originally a 240 m (790 ft) tall mast was planned, but aircraft flight safety considerations precluded this.

RÚV announced the retirement of its longwave transmissions in 2023, citing its inadequacy as a backup service as most vehicles and radios do not support longwave broadcasts anymore. The Eiðar tower was the first to be removed due to its proximity to Egilsstaðir Airport.

On 2 March 2023 the mast was demolished, ceasing 207 kHz transmissions.

== See also ==
- RÚV
- List of tallest structures in Europe
- List of tallest structures in Iceland
