= DTV radio =

Digital-television radio, DTV radio, or DTR describes the audio channels that are provided with a digital television service. These channels are delivered by cable television, direct-broadcast satellite or digital terrestrial television. In terms of variety, DTR falls somewhere between regular AM and FM radio, and satellite radio. However, because it is delivered through a digital signal, the actual sound quality can exceed both.

DTR may be available for free, or as part of a subscription television service. DTR music and audio channels are often provided as part of the "basic" television subscription service or package.

In a 2014 study, 11% of Americans listened to DTV radio on an average day, with 5.2% of time spent listening to audio attributed to DTV Radio.

== Number and availability of channels ==
In the United States, DirecTV offers up to 84 channels of Sonic Tap, and Dish Network offers 95 channels of SiriusXM Satellite Radio and Muzak for residential subscribers, depending on type of subscription. Music Choice offers 50 channels, which all fit on a single digital cable TV channel through multiplexing. This includes still video images which are sent at a low bit rate to identify the station and song, and give more info about the artist. CRN Digital Talk Radio Networks offers seven channels, all broadcasting talk radio. Terrestrial broadcasters account for over 450 audio channels. Some AM and FM broadcasters co-brand their DTV simulcasts with their traditional frequency numbers, such as WDNJ via WMBC-TV, and WSIC via WHWD-LD.

In Canada, digital television providers typically carry the digital radio service provided by Stingray Music, which provides up to 100 channels, and song information provided through either metadata rendered by the set-top box, or through an interactive menu interface which allows the viewer to navigate through channels and view playlists. While the Canadian Radio-television and Telecommunications Commission (CRTC) only specifically requires digital television providers to carry local community, campus, and CBC Radio stations, some offer feeds of most local AM and FM radio stations available in their service region. Some terrestrial broadcasters also carry audio channels, such as CH6498, CH5535-DT, CH2517-DT and CJON-DT.

In the United Kingdom, approximately 70 DTV radio channels are received by Sky Television customers, as part of their satellite television service. Around 40 channels are available on the digital terrestrial television service, free of charge using the Freeview service.

In Australia, stations of federal-government-funded television networks ABC and SBS broadcast audio channels each alongside their digital TV services. The ABC relays five AM/FM channels and five DAB+ radio channels featuring jazz, country, children's, Australian independent and alternative music, as well as capital city stations, national talk network, classical music, rolling news and youth radio. SBS relays SBS Radio 1, 2 and 3, as well as SBS Arabic, South Asian, Chill and PopAsia. The VAST satellite service relays almost 100 radio channels.

In the Philippines, Dream Satellite TV offered 10 audio channels, Cignal Digital TV offers a dozen AM and FM radio channels, and G Sat has 10 audio channels on their services.

In Switzerland, one of the technologies used by operators is DVB-C Radio (careful that there are now stations at least in Germany that use AAC-LC and that specialized devices exist) but the operator may offer additional encrypted channels or via streaming through the TV box they furnish. Anyway, the offer is not large enough.
