= Gúttóslagurinn =

1932 riot in Reykjavík, Iceland

The Gúttóslagurinn was a street riot in the center of Reykjavík that occurred on 9 November 1932.

The battle broke out between the police and workers at the Góðtemplarahús Reykjavíkur (popularly known as 'Gúttó'). Gúttó was a monolithic wooden building on the edge of Tjörnin, to the south of the Alþingishús on the corner of Templarasund and Vonarstræti, where city council meetings were held. (The building was demolished in 1968 and replaced by a parking lot for parliamentarians on the site.) At a meeting of the town council held on the 9th of November 1932, a proposal was made to reduce the city's work-creation schemes, despite the ongoing Great Depression causing increased unemployment in Iceland. A large crowd gathered together at Gúttó, and a protest began inside the building before spilling onto the street. The fight ended as police retreated and the proposal was withdrawn.

== Sources ==
- Bæjarstjórnarfundi hleypt upp: Samfylkingin, kommúnistar og sósíalistar gerðu í gær út árás gegn bæjarstjórn og lögreglu; grein í Morgunblaðinu 10. nóvember 1932
- Götubardaginn á miðvikudaginn; grein í Morgunblaðinu 1932
- Hvort ber að virða; grein í Morgunblaðinu 1979
