= Vatnsstígur 16-18 =

Coordinates: 64°8′49.25″N 21°55′27.64″W

Vatnsstígur 21, 2017

Vatnsstígur 16–18 is a residential tower located in downtown Reykjavík, Iceland. It is a part of a larger project called "shadow district" (Icelandic: Skuggahverfi) under phase 2. This tower is the tallest residential tower in Reykjavík, standing 69.35 m (227.5 ft) tall. Construction of phase 2 was delayed due to the financial crisis in 2008, and therefore was not completed on schedule.

== See also ==
- List of tallest buildings in Iceland
