= WDNJ =

Radio station in Hopatcong, New Jersey

- Hopatcong, New Jersey; United States
- Broadcast area: Sussex–Morris County, New Jersey
- Frequency: 88.1 MHz
- Branding: Verdades Que Liberan

Programming
- Format: Spanish Christian radio

Ownership
- Owner: Youngshine Media, Inc.
- Sister stations: WMBC-TV

Technical information
- Licensing authority: FCC
- Facility ID: 121770
- Class: A
- ERP: 500 watts
- HAAT: 118 meters
- Transmitter coordinates: 40°56′25.40″N 74°36′46.60″W

Links
- Public license information: Public file; LMS

WDNJ (88.1 MHz) is a Spanish language Christian radio station licensed to Hopatcong, New Jersey. It serves Sussex and Morris County, New Jersey. WDNJ is also carried on WMBC-TV's digital subchannel 63.8. WDNJ's offices and studios are co-shared with WMBC-TV in West Caldwell, New Jersey and its transmitter is located in Jefferson Township, New Jersey.
