= Smáralind =

Icelandic shopping mall

- Location: Kópavogur, Iceland
- Coordinates: 64°06′04″N 21°53′03″W
- Opened: 10 October 2001
- Developer: ÍSTAK
- Architect: Building Design Partnership
- Num. of stores: 92
- Floor area: 65,200 square metres (702,000 sq ft)
- Floors: 3
- Website: www.smaralind.is

Smáralind (Icelandic pronunciation: [ˈsmauːraˌlɪnt]) is a shopping mall located in the Capital Region of Iceland. It is one of the biggest shopping malls in Iceland, with over ninety shops, restaurants and services. Designed by BDP and built by ÍSTAK, it was opened on 10 October 2001 at 10:10 GMT. Smáralind competes with other shopping centers of the Capital Region: Kringlan mall and Reykjavík's old city centre.

== Shops ==
The mall's anchor tenants are Hagkaup and H&M (where formerly Debenhams resided). Other major tenants are Zara. The mall also houses a cinema. There are a number of well-known restaurants and cafés, including Subway, Pizza Hut, Sbarro, O'Learys, and T.G.I. Friday's among others.

== Controversy ==
Immediately after opening its resemblance to a giant phallus when viewed from the air created some notoriety.

== See also ==
- Kópavogur
- Kringlan
- Smáratorg Tower
