= Kringlan =

Shopping mall in Reykjavík, Iceland

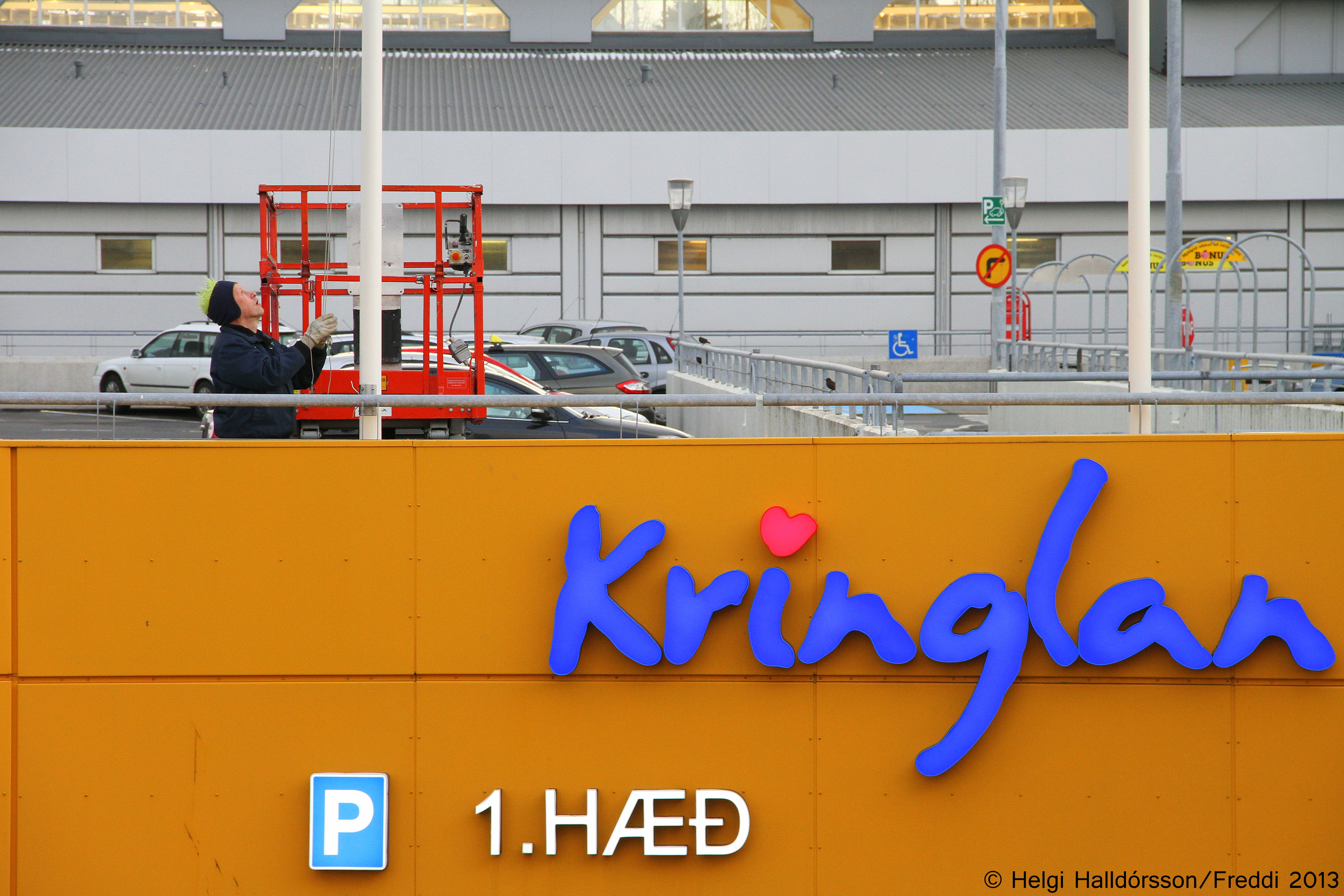
- Coordinates: 64°07′50″N 21°53′37″W
- Opened: 13 August 1987
- Num. of stores: 180+
- Floor area: 52,000 square metres (560,000 sq ft)
- Floors: 3
- Website: www.kringlan.is/english

Kringlan (Icelandic pronunciation: [ˈkʰriŋlan]) is a shopping mall located in the Icelandic capital region. It is the second largest in the country, after Smáralind in Kópavogur, with over 180 shops and restaurants. It was constructed in 1987, and includes a Hagkaup supermarket, a library, a theatre, a cinema, as well as a selection of well-known restaurants and retailers.

Kringlan lies on the busiest traffic intersection in Reykjavík. Icelandic state television RÚV’s headquarters are also nearby. Reykjavík City Theatre lies adjacent to the shopping centre.

Kringlan has some department stores which are H&M, Hagkaup, Next, 66North and Bónus.

On 15th June 2024, a fire broke out in the shopping mall's roof. Due to the fire, it had to remain closed until 20th June.

It was featured in the film Dreamland (2010).

== Name ==
The name is derived from the Kringla marsh or Kringlumýri [ˈkʰriŋlʏˌmiːrɪ]. A literal translation into English could either be 'circle' or 'pretzel', though the mall is neither circular nor has it anything to do with pretzels.

== See also ==
- Reykjavík
- Smáralind
