= RÚV =

Icelandic public broadcaster

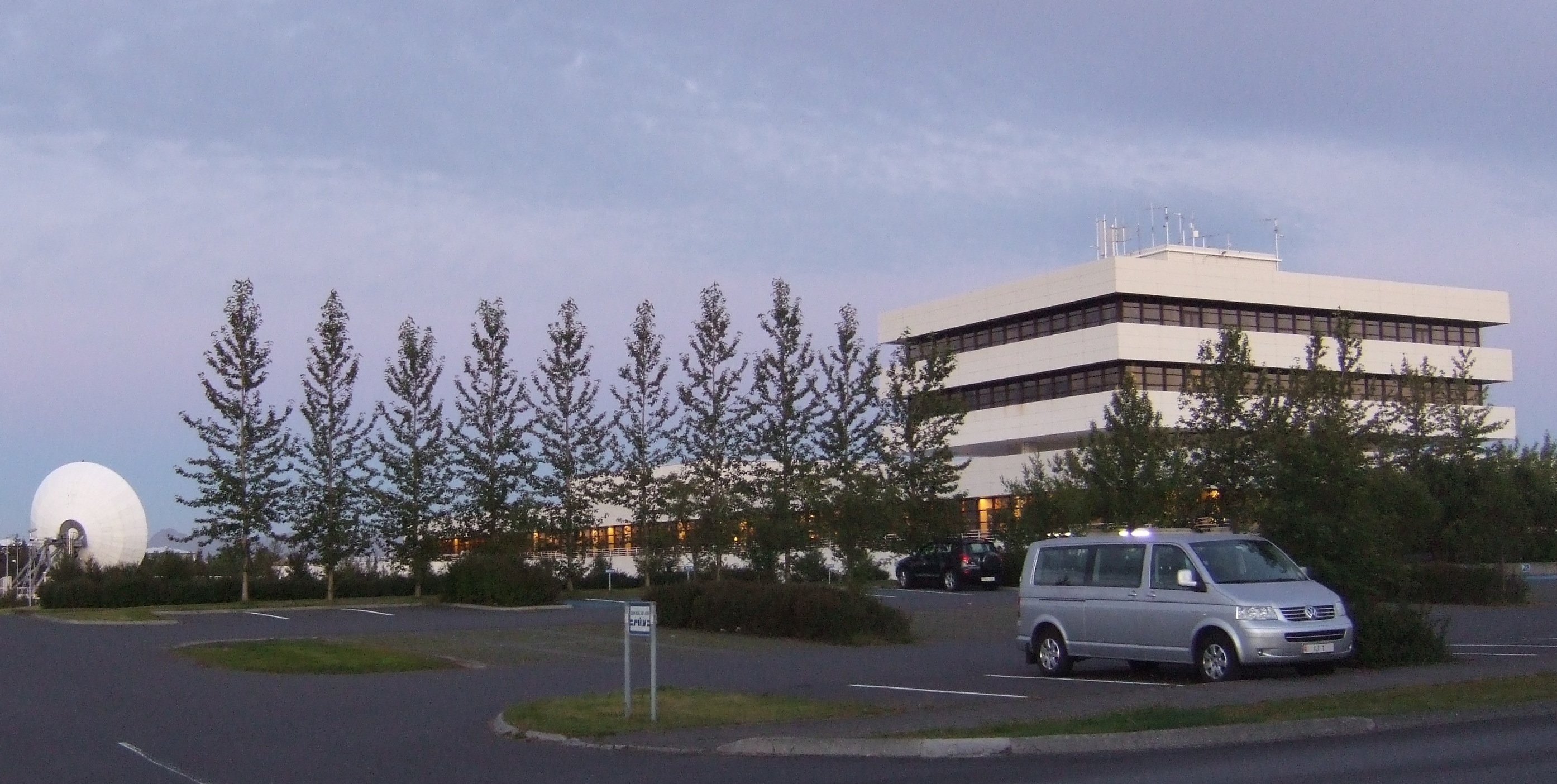
- Type: Television, radio and web
- Country: Iceland
- Availability: National; International via satellite (Thor 5) and online (selected programmes)
- Motto: RÚV okkar allra (RÚV of all of us)
- TV stations: 2
- TV transmitters: 146
- Radio stations: 3
- Radio transmitters: 230
- Revenue: 7.9 billion ISK
- Net income: 174 million ISK
- Headquarters: Reykjavík
- Owner: State-owned
- Key people: Stefán Eiríksson (director general)
- Launch date: 1930 (incorporation; radio); 1966 (television)
- Official website: ruv.is
- Language: Icelandic

Ríkisútvarpið (Icelandic pronunciation: [ˈriːcɪsˌuːtvar̥pɪð], lit. 'National Broadcasting'; abbr. RÚV [ˈruːv]) is Iceland's national public-service broadcasting organization.

Founded in 1930, it operates from studios in the country's capital, Reykjavík, as well as regional centres around the country. RÚV operates an online news service, which is the fourth most visited website in Iceland. In 2016, 88% of Icelanders consumed RÚV content every week.

The service broadcasts an assortment of general programming to a wide national audience via two broadcast radio stations: Rás 1 and Rás 2; and one full-time television channel of the same name, RÚV. A supplementary, part-time TV channel, RÚV 2 is also broadcast for special events. It also distributes online-only channels and content for children and the elderly.

RÚV is funded by a flat earmarked government tax collected from every income tax payer, as well as from on-air advertising. All of RÚV's content is free-to-air and open in Iceland.

== History ==
The Icelandic National Broadcasting Service commenced operations in 1930 with the launch of Icelandic state radio, Útvarp Reykjavík (Radio Reykjavík). RÚV has been a full active member of the European Broadcasting Union since 1956.

=== Radio ===
==== Beginnings, longwave, medium-wave and shortwave broadcasts ====
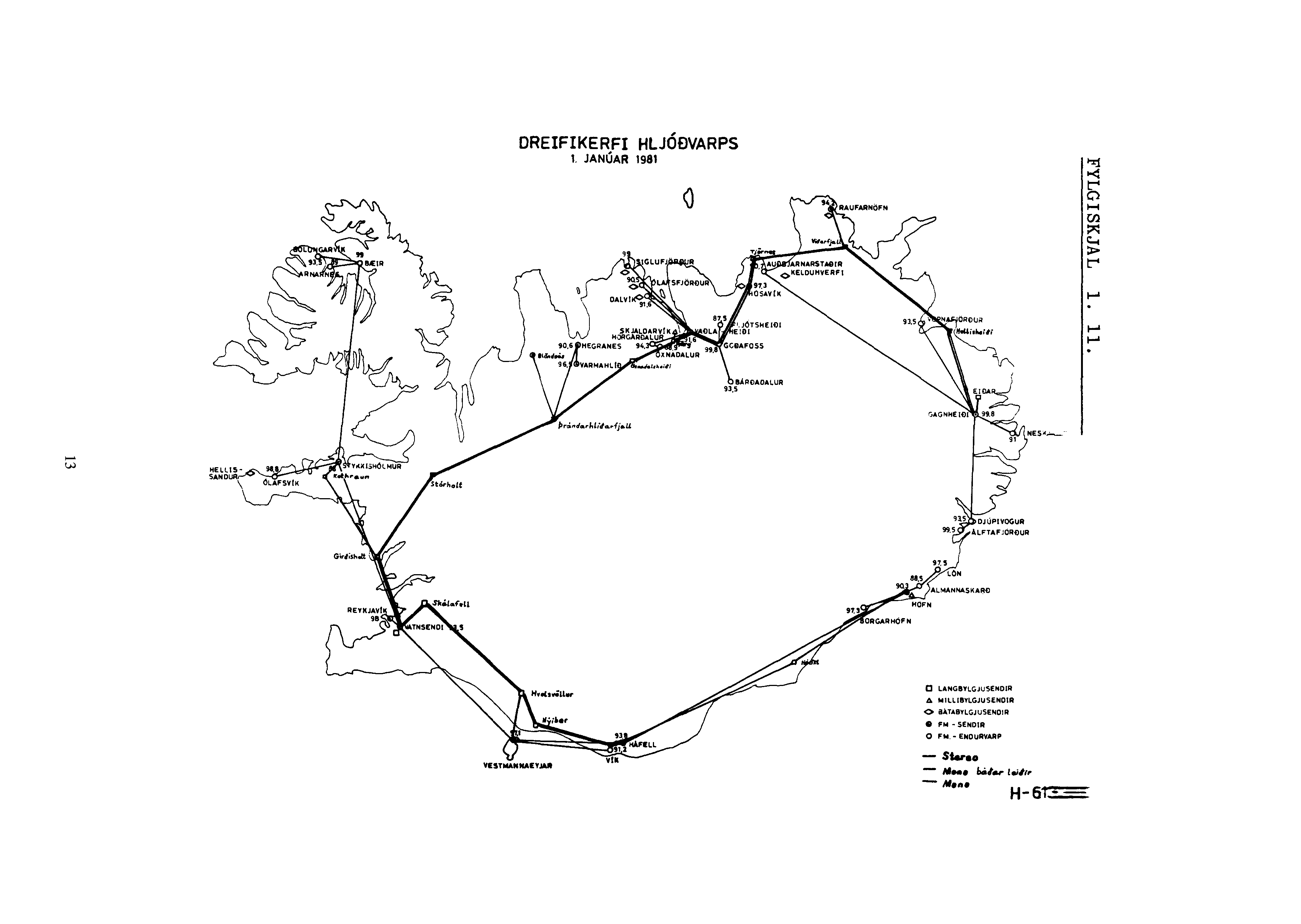
Icelandic radio transmission network in 1981.

Icelandic radio broadcasting began on longwave in 1930 at Vatnsendhæð, as Útvarp Reykjavík, near Reykjavík, this station would later be called Rás 1.

In 1991, the original Longwave transmitter tower at Vatnsendahæð collapsed during a storm. Subsequently, the Hellissandur longwave transmitter was taken into use in 1999, making it Western Europe's tallest radio mast during its time of operation. At the same time, longwave broadcasts became a mix of Rás 1 and Rás 2 content. Longwave transmissions were intended to fill gaps in the FM coverage, serve the Icelandic fishing fleet and serve as a back up during emergencies.

In 2023-2024, RÚV discontinued longwave services due its inadequacy as a backup service as most vehicles and radios do not support longwave broadcasts anymore. In 2023, the Eiðar longwave transmitter was demolished, followed by the Hellissandur longwave transmitter ceasing broadcasts in September 2024 while the mast remained in place, marking the end of longwave broadcasts in Iceland.

Shortwave broadcasts were used for long distance transmission, mostly for seafarers and Icelanders abroad. They were used intermittently for important broadcasts. Shortwave broadcasts ceased on 1 July 2007, after the introduction of satellite broadcasts.

==== FM broadcasting ====
FM broadcasting began in 1959 at its main Vatnsendi site, later expanding nationwide. Stereo transmissions began in 1980. In 1983 RÚV's second radio station was launched, Rás 2. The original station was then renamed Rás 1. In 2023, as a result of longwave transmissions retiring, RÚV committed to expanding the FM network.

In 2004, RÚV launched a non-talk, automated classical and jazz radio station called Rondó, based on the word rondo. In 2020, Rondó was discontinued on FM (due to the closure of Vatnsendi site) but continued on DVB and on the internet.

=== Television ===
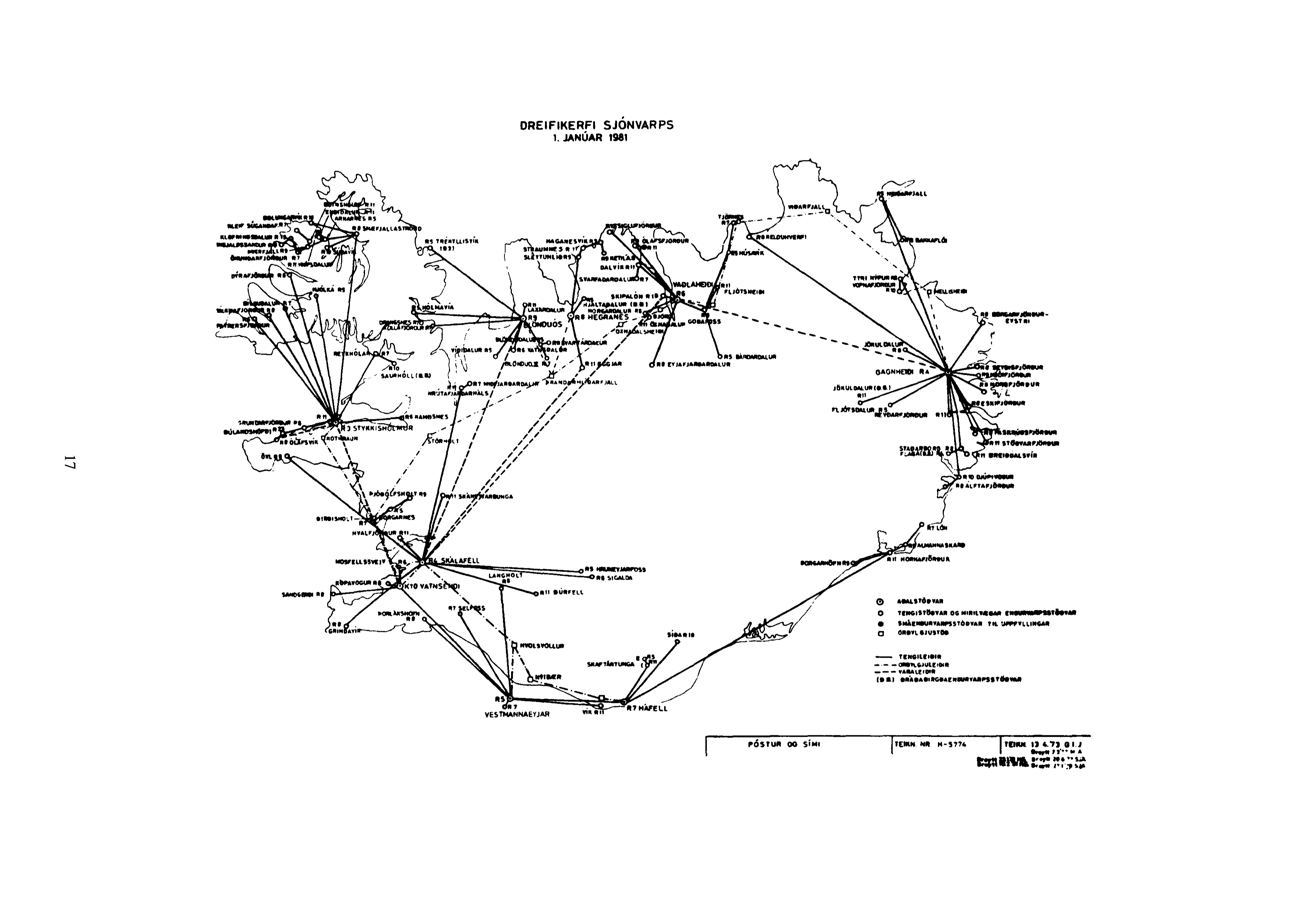
RÚV TV transmission network in 1981.

RÚV commenced television transmissions in 1966, and colour transmissions began in 1977. In 1981, the first live satellite programmes were broadcast, from the then-newly inaugurated satellite ground station Skyggnir.

Since 1986, the year in which its monopoly as the only permitted domestic broadcaster ended, RÚV has faced competition from a number of private broadcasting companies, most notably the 365 corporation.

RÚV's teletext service, Textavarpið, was inaugurated on the 25th anniversary of Icelandic television in 1991. As of 2023 it is still operating.

In May 2007, RÚV began direct satellite TV broadcasts over DVB-S, supplemented by Rás 1 and Rás 2 over satellite DTV radio, in order to service fishing fleets around Iceland and remote areas where the terrestrial network does not reach. Telenor ASA ran the service until it ceased by mid-2025. The service was encrypted and was only available on request.

High definition digital television broadcasts in 1080i began in 2013, over a new digital terrestrial DVB-T2 network. Television was broadcast in analogue until the digital switchover in 2015, when the last analogue transmitter at Vatnsendi was switched off. The analogue transmissions used a network of 180 analogue transmitters. However, most users access RÚV content by managed IPTV services or over-the-top services.

In 2021, television transmissions for the Reykjavík area were moved from Vatnsendi to Úlfarsfell, ending 70 years of broadcasting from the location.

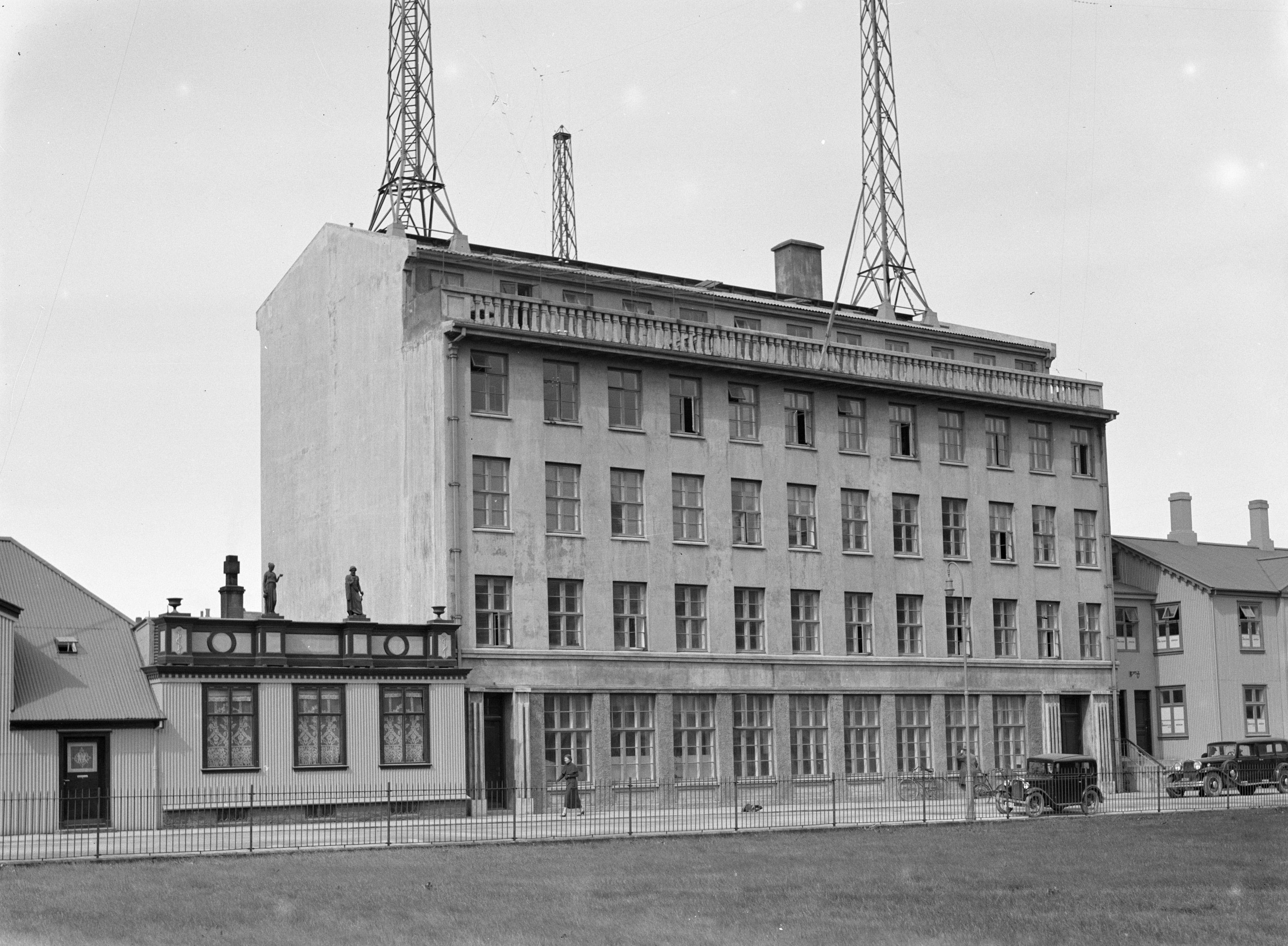
RÚV's original 1930 headquarters until 1959.

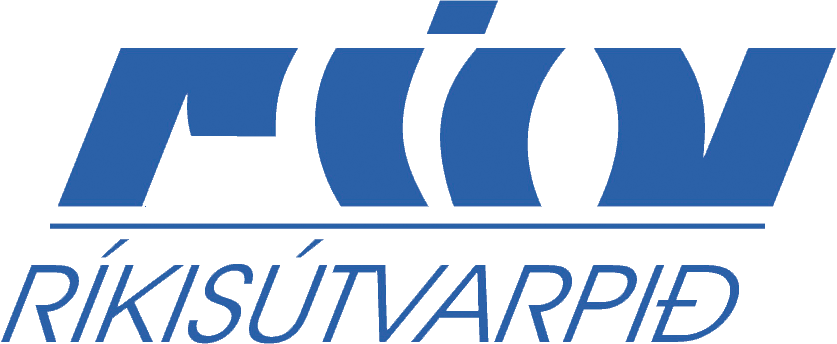
RÚV logo used until 2011

== Programming ==
RÚV is obliged by the terms of its charter to "promote the Icelandic language, Icelandic history, and Iceland's cultural heritage" and "honour basic democratic rules, human rights, and the freedom of speech and opinion". It carries a substantial amount of arts, media, and current affairs programming, in addition to which it also supplies general entertainment in the form of feature films and such internationally popular television drama series as Lost and Desperate Housewives. RÚV's lineup also includes sports coverage, documentaries, domestically produced entertainment shows, and children's programming.

The RÚV newsroom, providing news for both television and radio, is amongst the most time-honoured and respected in Iceland. On weekdays, the Rás 2 radio network includes 35 minutes of regional opt-outs for local news coverage.

Gettu betur is a popular annual quiz tournament pitting teams from senior secondary schools around Iceland against each other in five rounds which are broadcast on radio and TV. Popular viewing also includes the Eurovision Song Contest, in which RÚV has participated representing Iceland since 1986 and until 2025. In sports, RÚV traditionally carries live coverage of such major events as the Olympic Games and the FIFA World Cup, although it lost the right to broadcast the 2006 World Cup, having been outbid by commercial broadcaster 365 in 2002. It did, however, show the 2010 World Cup tournament.

== Services ==
RÚV broadcasts two linear television channels and three radio stations, each with a certain target market. In accordance with its duty as a public broadcasting service, Sjónvarpið, the television network, broadcasts a news bulletin in Icelandic Sign Language for the deaf and hard of hearing. In addition, the Rás 1 radio channel broadcasts detailed weather reports for the benefit of Icelandic seafarers and others.

=== Television channels ===
RÚV 2 logo (2019)

- RÚV Television (also known as Sjónvarpið) – main channel with generalist programming
- RÚV 2 – part-time "special events" channel that does not offer a continuous daytime schedule, but rather is used as a supplement to the main channel. It mainly offers live broadcasts and recordings of significant cultural and sporting events, both domestic and foreign.
- KrakkaRÚV – an online service aimed at children and young people, launched in 2015

Those who watch television on the internet outside Iceland can only watch selected programs on RÚV and RÚV 2 channels due to broadcasting rights.

=== Radio stations ===
Rondó logo (2019)

- Rás 1 (Channel 1) – News, weather, current affairs, culture
- Rás 2 (Channel 2) – Pop and rock music
- Rondó – Non-stop classical music and jazz (DVB-T2 and web only)

== Distribution ==
As of 2023, most of the population accesses RÚV through the internet. FM radio broadcasts remain popular however, 30% of Icelanders listen to Rás 1 and 61% listen to Rás 2 in a given week. This can be attributed to Iceland's high car ownership.

=== Radio ===
RÚV's radio stations, Rás 1 and Rás 2, are broadcast on FM through a network of 230 FM transmitters. RÚV intends to strengthen its FM network over the coming years in light of their plan to closing their longwave services in 2024.

The radio stations are also broadcast via terrestrial DTV radio on DVB-T2, as well as through internet radio. There are no plans to implement DAB radio in Iceland.

=== Television ===
The television network, RÚV and RÚV 2, is broadcast terrestrially in 1080i HD on a DVB-T2 network operated by Sýn by contract until 2028. The broadcasts are free-to-air and reach 99.9% of the population. According to a 2022 survey, only 1% of the population uses terrestrial broadcasts to watch RÚV.

Due to the prevalence of fiber internet connections in Iceland, the most popular way to view broadcasts is through the internet. RÚV is available through managed IPTV systems on Síminn and Vodafone. RÚV also offers all of its content on their website, as well as through OTT services. RÚV also offers an app for Apple TV, iOS, Android TV and Android. Webcasts are open and free when accessed from Iceland, however some programming is not available internationally due to licensing issues. It is possible to login using an Icelandic digital ID to have full access to broadcasts internationally.

Share of distribution channels
| Distribution method | Market share |
|---|---|
| Terrestrial broadcasts (DVB) | 1% |
| IPTV set-top box (Síminn/Sýn) | 64% |
| OTT services (e.g. Apple TV app) | 27% |
| Website | 7% |
| Other | 1% |

== See also ==
- List of Icelandic television channels
- Television in Iceland
- RÚV (television channel)
- Rás 1
- Rás 2
- Telecommunications in Iceland
- Internet in Iceland
