= Hellissandur =

Village in Iceland

- Village
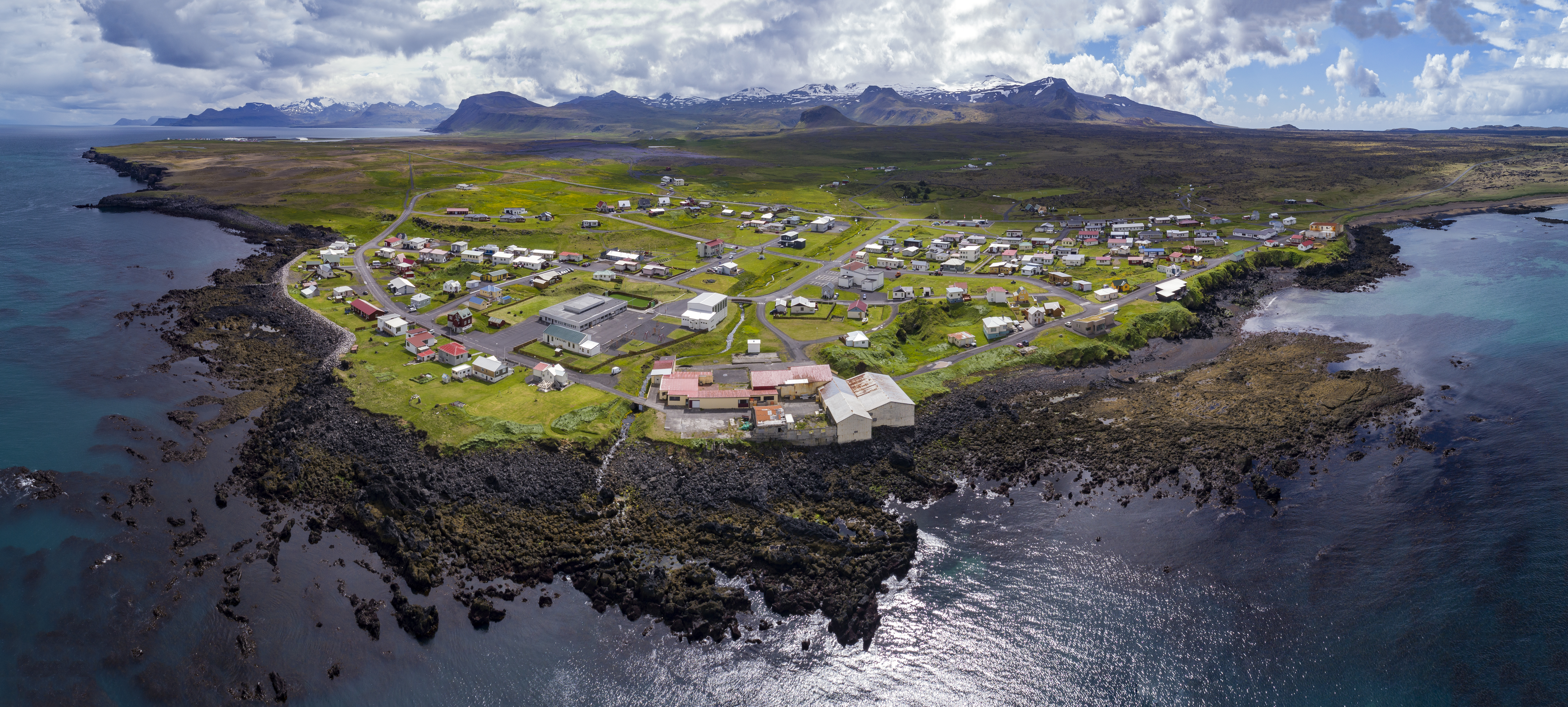

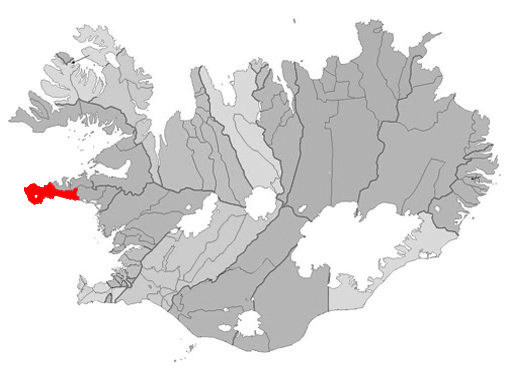
- Location of the municipality of Snæfellsbær

- Location in Iceland
- Coordinates: 64°55′N 23°54′W
- Country: Iceland
- Constituency: Northwest Constituency
- Region: Western Region
- Municipality: Snæfellsbær

Population (2024)
  - Total: 474 (including Rif)
- Time zone: UTC+0 (GMT)
- Post Code: 360
- Website: Official website

Hellissandur at Snæfellsnes Peninsula

Hellissandur (Icelandic pronunciation: [ˈhɛtlɪsˌsantʏr̥]) is a village and part of the Snæfellsbær municipality at the northwestern tip of Snæfellsnes peninsula in western Iceland.

Once an important fishing post, the village has recently experienced growth in tourism. The maritime museum has examples of the turf roof houses once common across Iceland, as well as marine engines and Iceland's oldest rowing boat (1826). According to the 2024 census, Hellissandur and nearby Rif [ˈrɪːf] have 474 inhabitants. Hellissandur is one of the first and oldest fishing villages in Iceland and is traced back to the 16th century.

One of the points of interest near Hellissandur is the Snæfellsjökull glacier, made famous by Jules Verne in his science fiction novel Journey to the Center of the Earth. Just outside the village, there is the northern entrance to the Snæfellsjökull National Park, which surrounds the western and southern sides of the glacier. Nearby is the 412 m (1,352 ft) tall Gufuskálar radio mast, the tallest structure in Western Europe, located 2 km (1.2 mi) westward.
