= Úlfarsfell =

Mountain in Iceland

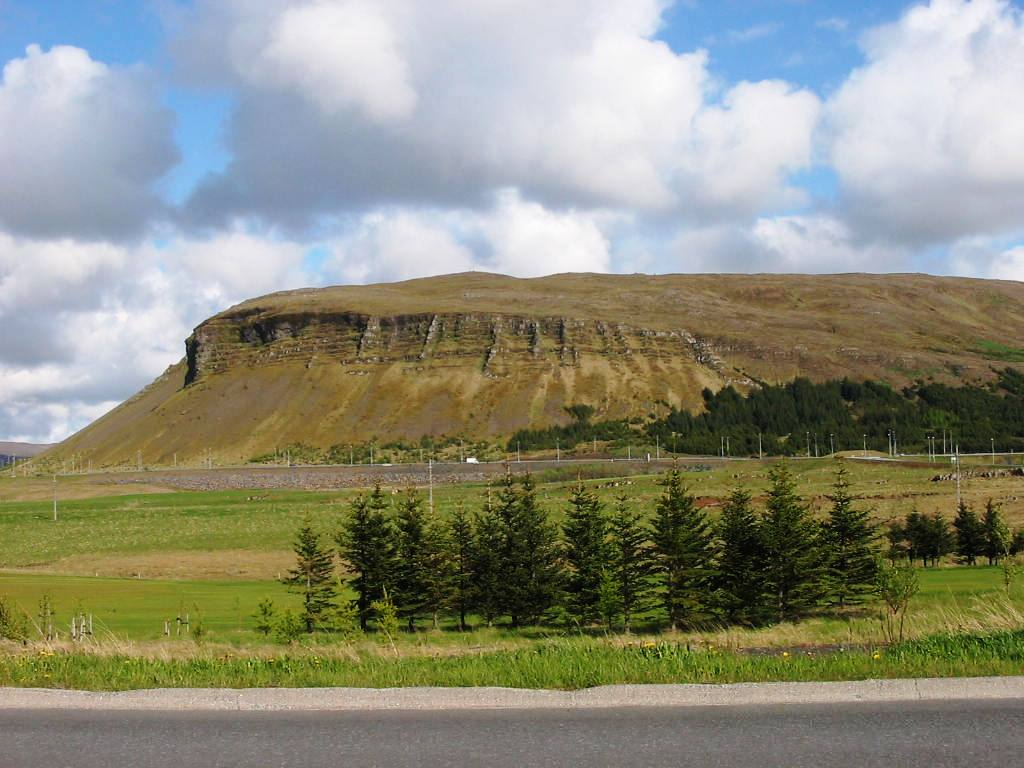

Highest point
- Elevation: 296 m (971 ft)
- Coordinates: 64°08′49″N 21°42′37″W

Geography
- Location within Iceland

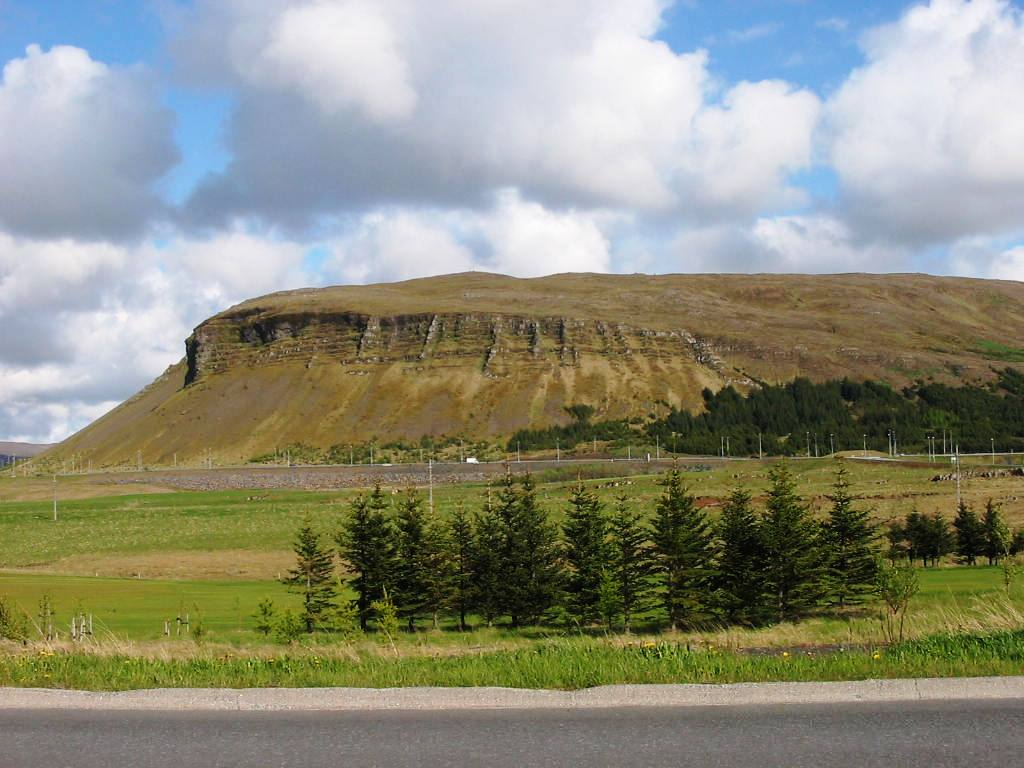
Úlfarsfell

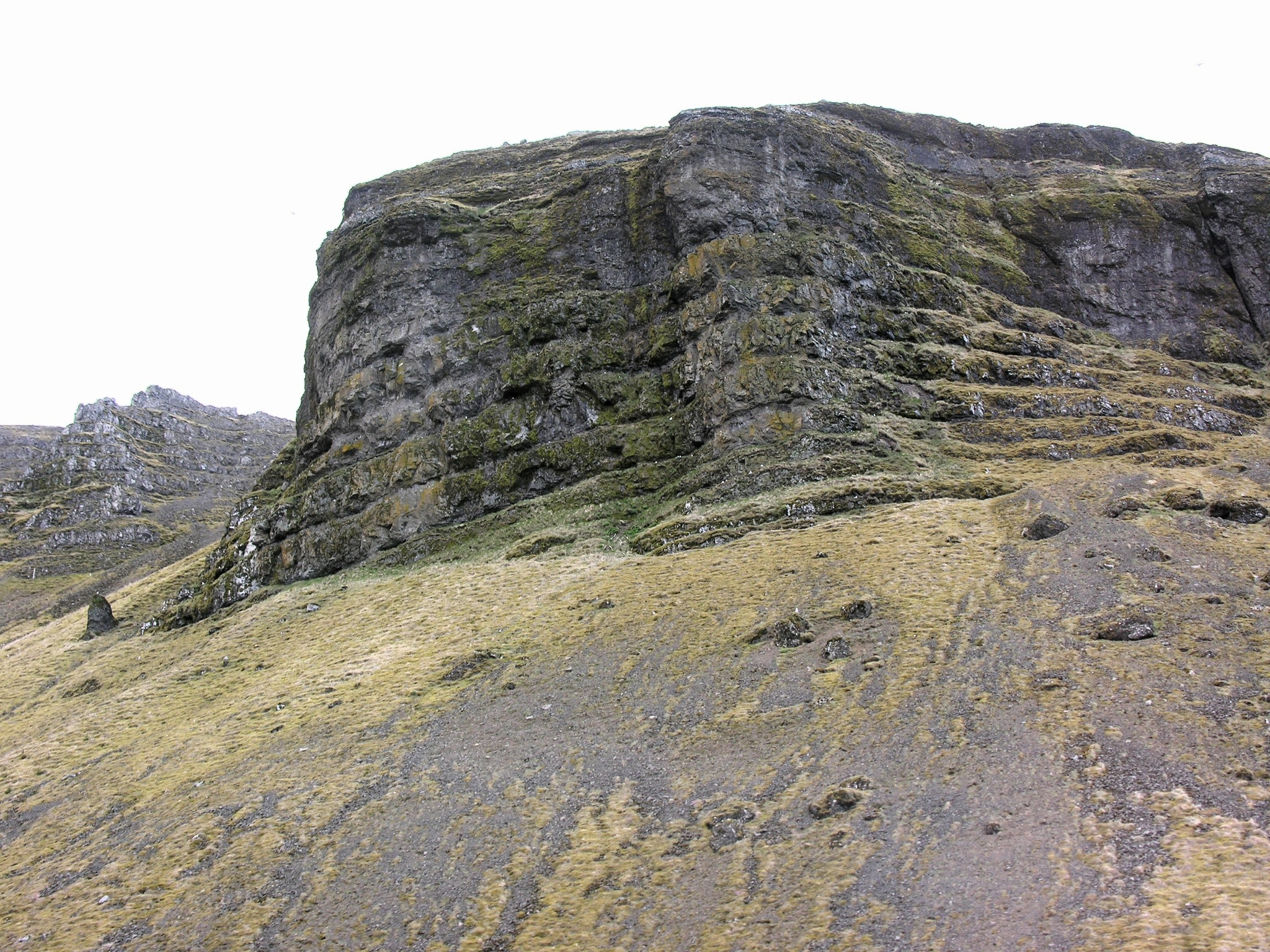
The iconic cliffs on the northwest side of Úlfarsfell.

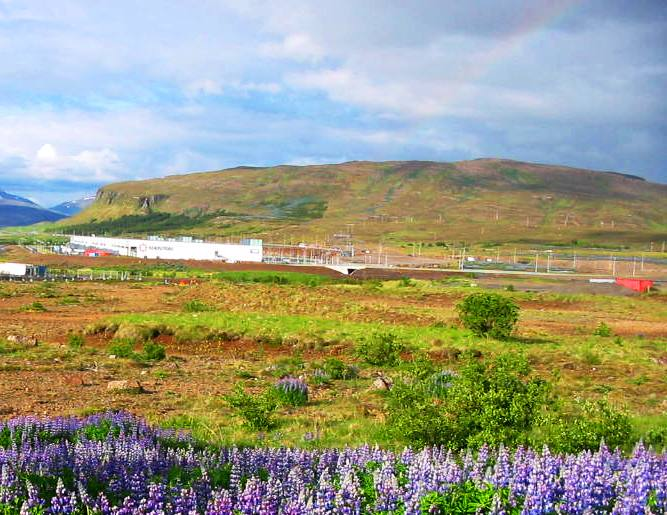
Úlfarsfell with nootka lupin in the foreground.

Úlfarsfell (Icelandic pronunciation: [ˈulvar̥sˌfɛtl̥]) is a mountain in the municipality of Mosfellsbær in the Reykjavík metropolitan area. It is 296 meters high. The mountain slopes have been subject to extensive forestry.

Úlfarsfell is mentioned in the written work Hítardalsbók from 1367 and in the land registry from 1704 by Árni Magnússon and Páll Vídalín. The name of the mountain, and the nearby river Úlfarsá, likely comes from a settler named Úlfar, which was born by at least four settlers according to Landnáma, the book of settlers.

The mountain currently hosts television and radio transmitters for the Reykjavik area, after transmissions were moved from the former Vatnsendi site.
