= Hellissandur longwave radio mast =

Radio mast in Iceland

- Langbylgjustöðin á Gufuskálum
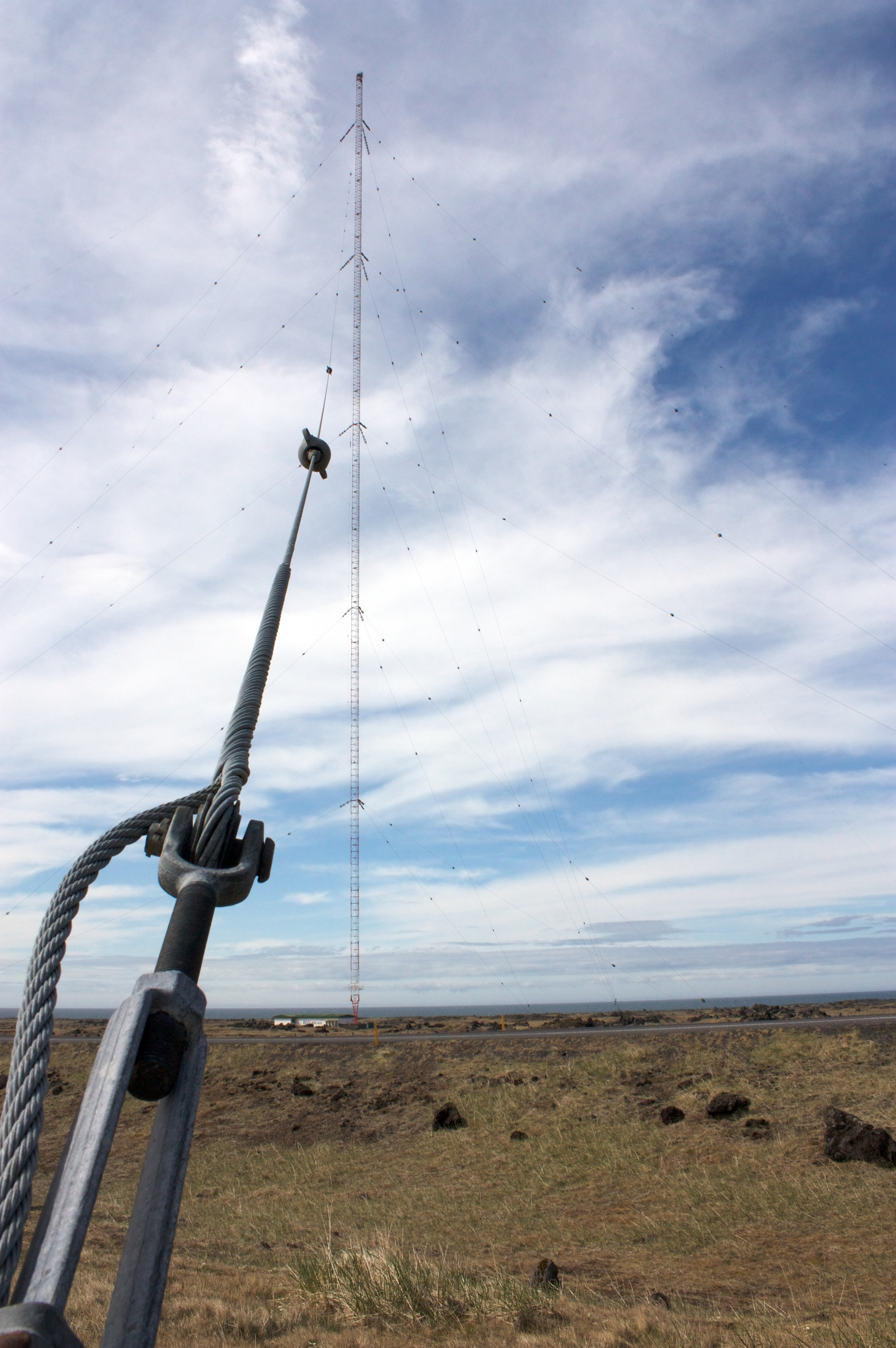
- View of the Hellissandur masts
- Interactive map of the Hellissandur longwave radio mast area

General information
- Status: Completed
- Type: Mast radiator insulated against the ground
- Location: Hellissandur, Iceland
- Coordinates: 64°54′26″N 23°55′20″W
- Completed: 1963
- Inaugurated: 1999-09-08 (Longwave transmissions)

Height
- Height: 412 m (1,351.71 ft)

Design and construction
- Main contractor: US Coast Guard

The Hellissandur radio mast (Icelandic: Langbylgjustöðin á Gufuskálum [ˈlauŋkˌpɪlcʏˌstœːðɪn auː ˈkʏːvʏˌskauːlʏm]) is a 412 m (1,352 ft) tall guyed radio mast formerly used for longwave radio transmissions of RÚV (The Icelandic National Broadcasting Service) and the North Atlantic LORAN-C chain. It is situated at Gufuskálar [ˈkʏːvʏˌskauːlar̥], near Hellissandur on the Snæfellsnes peninsula of West Iceland. It was, for a time, the tallest longwave radio mast in the world, and is currently the tallest above ground structure in Western Europe.

It formed part of RÚV's longwave service, and was intended to fill in the gaps of the FM radio spectrum, serve seafarers, and act as a critical communications facility. It previously operated in parallel with the less powerful Eiðar longwave transmitter to provide nationwide longwave coverage.

The mast is insulated against the ground, and guyed at five levels by steel ropes which are subdivided by insulators. It was built in 1963 to replace the 190.5 m (625 ft) tall LORAN-C mast, constructed in 1959 for the North Atlantic LORAN-C chain (GRD 7970). A second, smaller, 30 m (98 ft) tall tower was installed by the US Coast Guard in the autumn of 1961 as part of a LORAN-A network paired with Greenland.

The LORAN-C scheme closed in 1994. In 1991, the original RÚV longwave transmitter towers, erected in 1930, at Vatnsendi (near Reykjavík) collapsed. As the Hellissandur mast was free for use, it was converted for use by RÚV (The Icelandic National Broadcasting Service) for its longwave transmissions on 189 kHz at a power of 300 kilowatts in 1997.

In 2023 RÚV announced the retirement of all its longwave transmissions by 2024, citing its inadequacy as a backup service, as most consumer radio equipment no longer supports longwave broadcasts. The Eiðar site was earmarked for demolition in 2023. The Hellissandur transmitter went off the air on 5 September 2024 and on 17 October it was officially announced as closed. The mast remains in place.

== See also ==
- List of masts
- List of tallest structures in Iceland
- List of tallest structures in Europe
- RÚV
- LORAN-C
