= WMBC-TV =

Television station in Newton, New Jersey

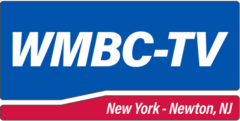
- Newton, New Jersey; New York, New York; United States
- City: Newton, New Jersey
- Channels: Digital: 18 (UHF); Virtual: 63
- Branding: Estrella TV 63 Nueva York

Programming
- Affiliations: 63.1: Estrella TV; for others, see § Subchannels

Ownership
- Owner: Mountain Broadcasting Corporation
- Operator: MediaCo

History
- Founded: August 1987
- First air date: April 26, 1993
- Former channel number: Analog: 63 (UHF, 1993–2009)
- Former affiliations: FamilyNet (1993–1996); Main Street TV (1993–1996); Independent (1996–2024); Merit TV (2024–2025)
- Call sign meaning: Mountain Broadcasting Corporation

Technical information
- Licensing authority: FCC
- Facility ID: 43952
- ERP: 250 kW
- HAAT: 520 m (1,706 ft)
- Transmitter coordinates: 40°42′46.8″N 74°0′47.3″W

Links
- Public license information: Public file; LMS
- Website: wmbctv.com

WMBC-TV (channel 63) is a television station licensed to Newton, New Jersey, United States, serving as the New York metropolitan area outlet for Estrella TV. Owned by the Mountain Broadcasting Corporation and managed by MediaCo, the station maintains studios on Clinton Road in West Caldwell, New Jersey; it transmits from atop One World Trade Center in Lower Manhattan.

== History ==
Mountain Broadcasting was founded in 1985 by a group of Korean Americans, led by the Reverend Sun Young Joo of Wayne, New Jersey. The group secured a construction permit from the FCC to build channel 63 in 1987, and the station began operations on April 26, 1993, with a Christian religious format, running mostly programs from FamilyNet. Later in 1993, the station also began running public domain movies and film shorts from Main Street TV, along with FamilyNet programs.

In 1996, when New York City-owned WNYC-TV (channel 31, now Ion Television owned-and-operated station WPXN-TV) dropped its ethnic, foreign-language television programming following its sale to private interests, many of these programs were picked up by WMBC-TV. WMBC also dropped FamilyNet and Main Street TV programming and began to air more infomercials and religious shows directly from ministries. By 1997, it ran a blend of religion and infomercials during the day and ethnic shows at night and on Saturdays. It was also running several hours a week of educational kids' shows, and began producing a local newscast.

In the immediate aftermath of the September 11 attacks, the station temporarily broadcast NBC's flagship station WNBC (channel 4).

WMBC had an extremely weak over-the-air signal in New York City, but with a new antenna atop One World Trade Center, it can be seen more clearly. The station is also carried on most of the cable providers in that market, including Charter Spectrum and Optimum. Its signal was dropped from DirecTV's New York City local stations package on December 31, 2005; however, DirecTV resumed carriage of WMBC in early 2009.

== Programming ==
Prior to the switch to Merit Street Media, WMBC-TV's lineup consisted of brokered ethnic and religious programs, a half-hour weekday newscast, infomercials and children's programs to satisfy the Federal Communications Commission (FCC)'s "educational/informational" requirements. As of late 2025, WMBC-TV's programming became a full-power HD affiliate for the Spanish-language network, Estrella TV, following a lease management agreement between station ownership and MediaCo Holding Inc.

== Technical information ==
=== Subchannels ===
The station's signal is multiplexed:

Subchannels of WMBC-TV
Subchannel	Res.	Short name	Programming
63.1	720p	ESTRETV	Estrella TV
63.2	480i	MYSTERY	Ion Mystery
63.4	480i	NTD	NTD America
63.5	480i	NTDTV	NTD Television (in Chinese)
63.6	480i	JTV	Jewelry TV
63.7	480i	ALIENTO	Aliento Vision (in Spanish)
63.9	Audio only	KCBN	Korean Christian Broadcasting Network
63.10	Audio only	WDNJ	WDNJ 88.1 FM (Spanish Christian)

=== Analog-to-digital conversion ===
WMBC-TV ended regular programming on its analog signal, over UHF channel 63, on February 17, 2009, to conclude the federally mandated transition from analog to digital television. The station's digital signal remained on its pre-transition UHF channel 18, using virtual channel 63.

== See also ==
- List of independent television stations in the United States
- List of television stations in New Jersey
- List of United States over-the-air television networks
