= List of tallest structures in the Soviet Union =

This is an incomplete list of the tallest structures that are built in the former Soviet Union.

== Tallest structures ==
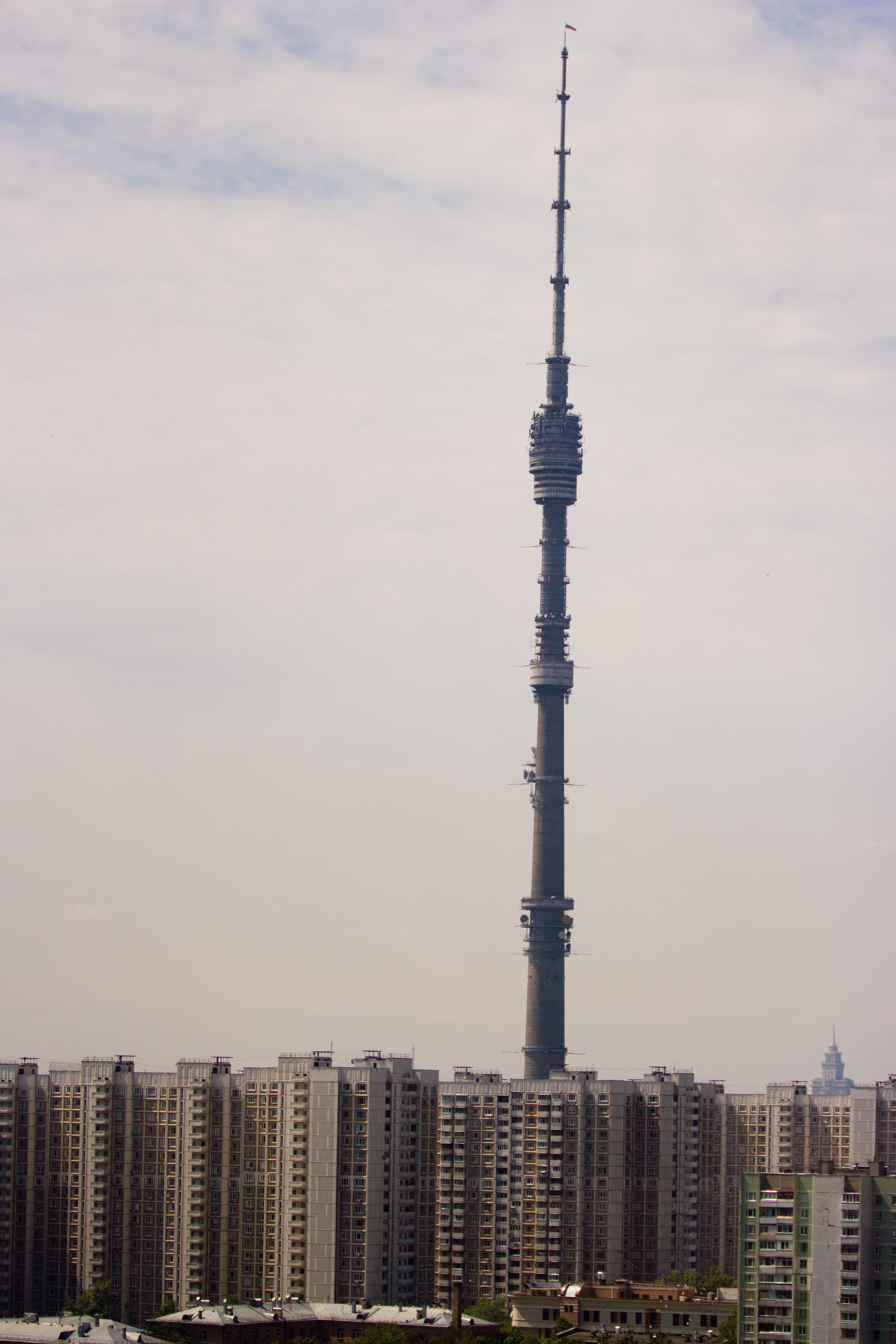
Ostankino Tower (540.1 m)

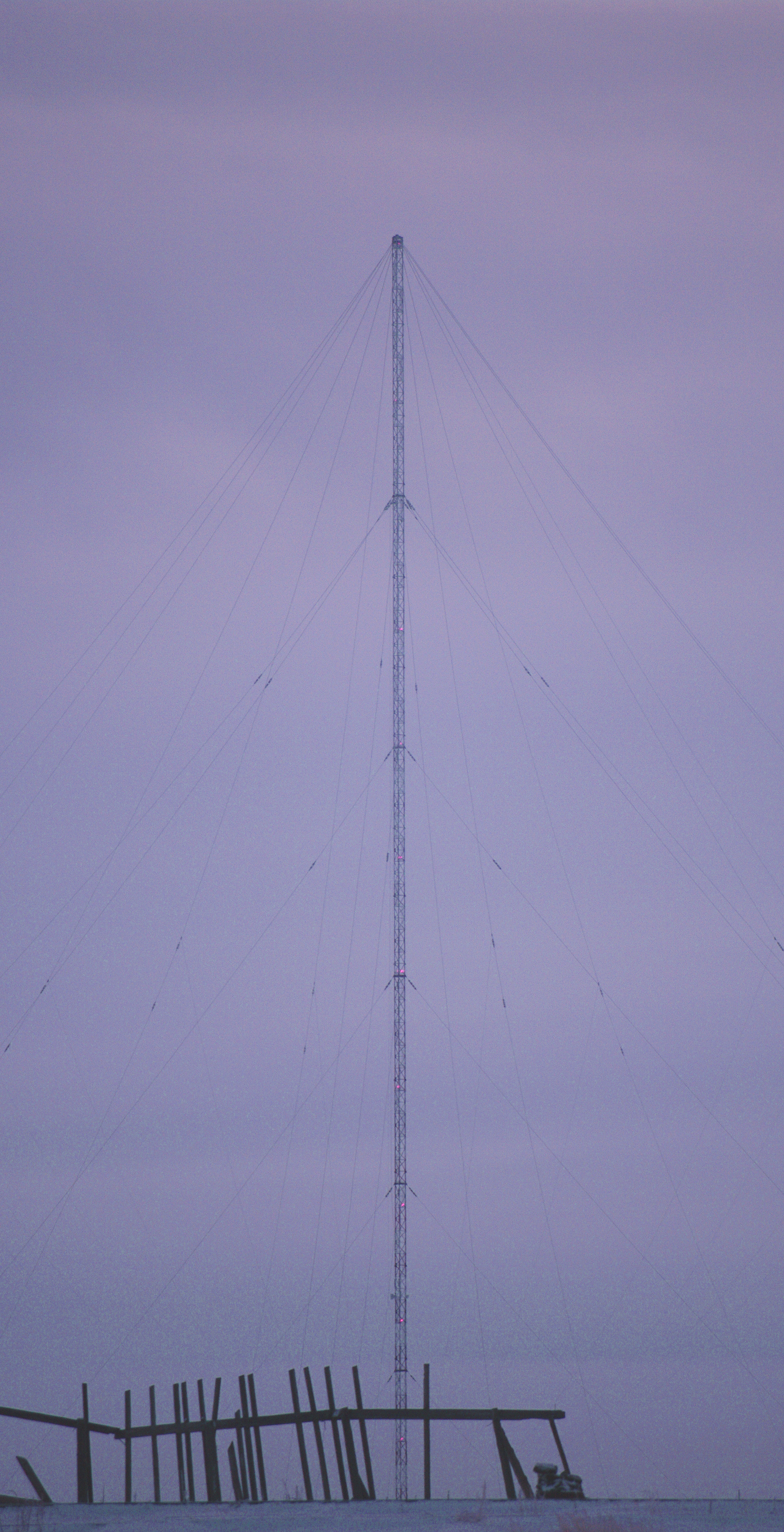
Dudinka CHAYKA-Mast (468 m)

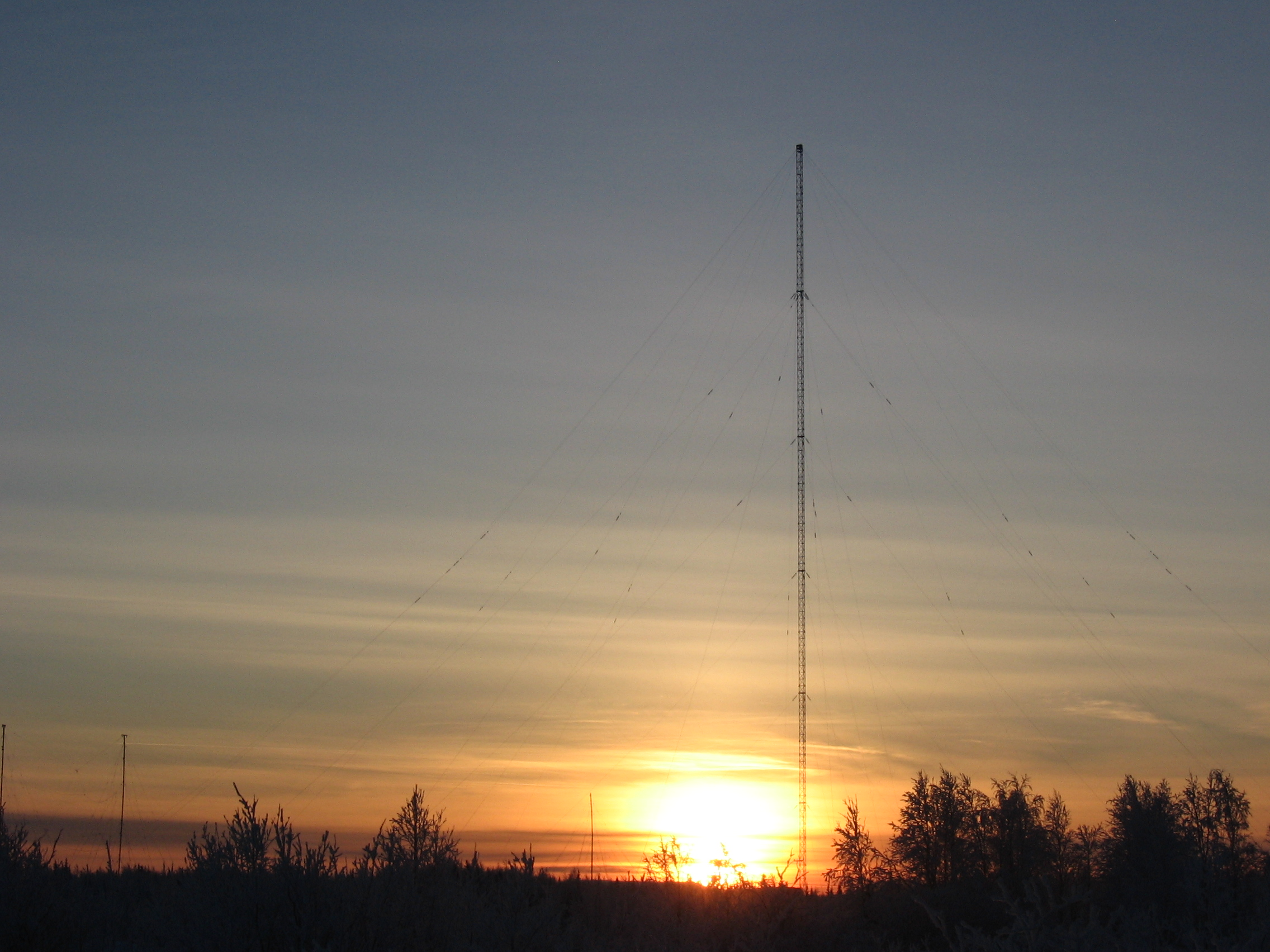
Inta CHAYKA-Mast (462 m)

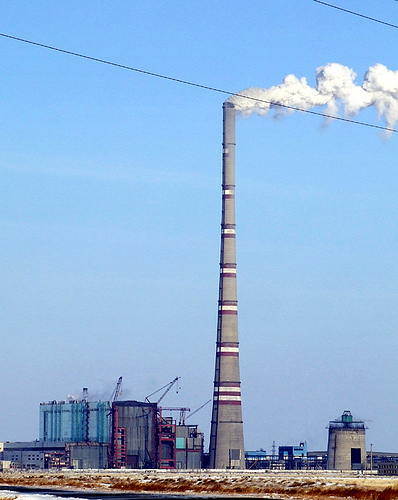
GRES-2 Power Station (419.7 m)

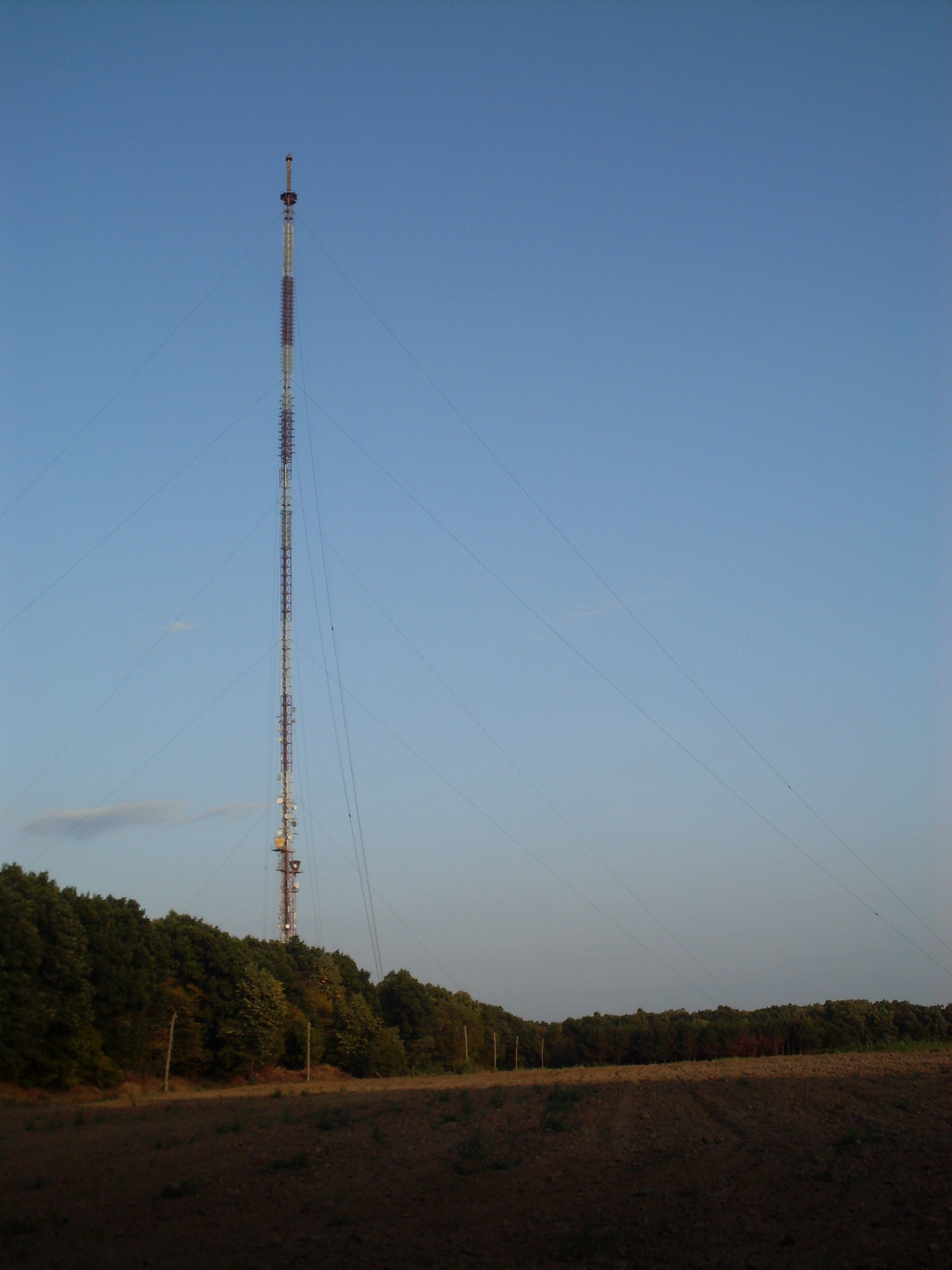
Străşeni TV Mast (355 m)

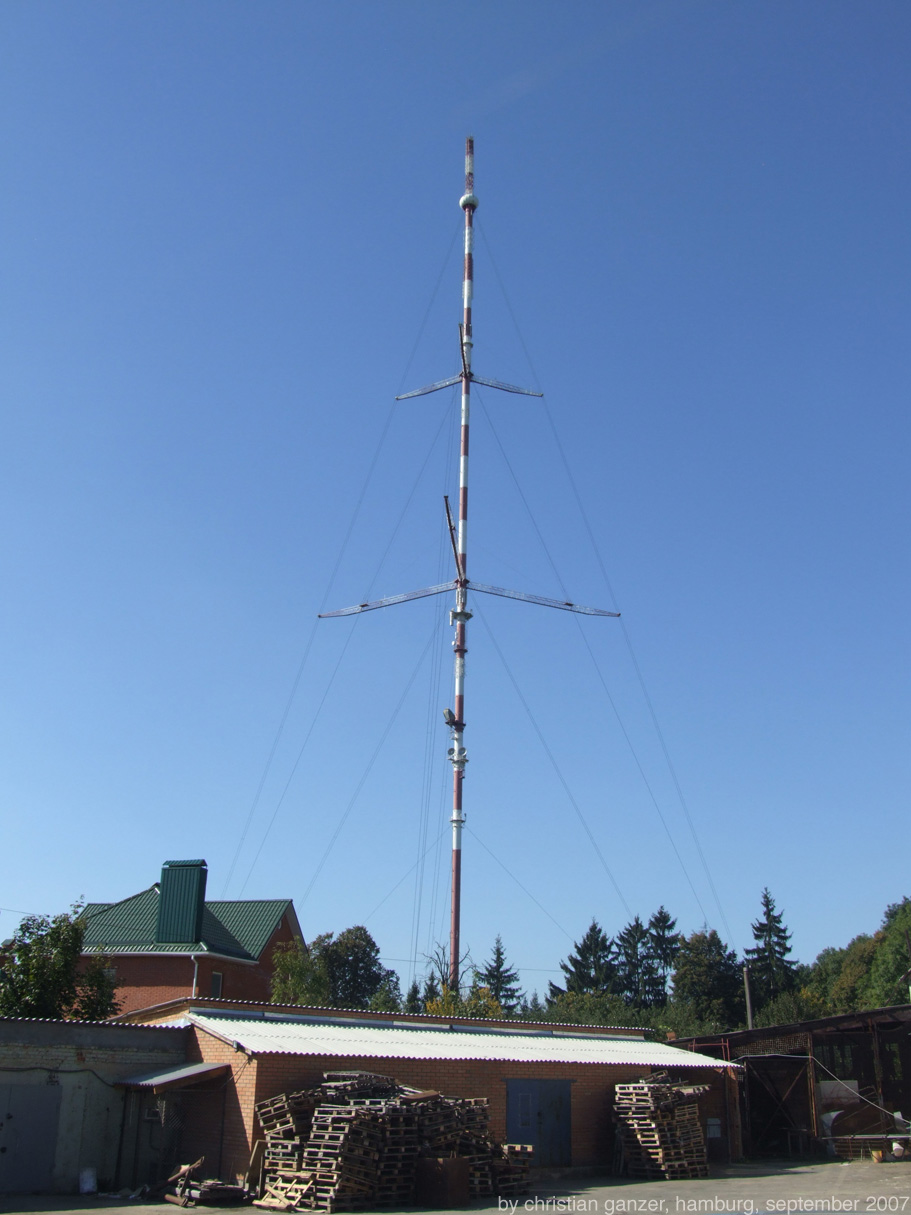
TV Tower Vinnytsia (354 m)

Construction	Year	Country	Town	Pinnacle height	Structural type	Coordinates	Remarks
Ostankino Tower	1967	Russia	Moscow	540.1 m (1,772 ft)	Tower (concrete)	55°49′10.94″N 37°36′41.79″E	Tallest structure in Europe and the 8th tallest freestanding structure in the world
Dudinka CHAYKA-Mast ru:Список самых высоких телевизионных башен и радиомачт России	196?	Russia	Dudinka	468 m (1,535 ft)	Guyed mast	69°21′45″N 86°41′49″E	
Taymylyr CHAYKA-Mast	196?	Russia	Taymylyr	462 m (1,516 ft)	Guyed mast	72°34′49.04″N 122°6′42.3″E	demolished on 24 September 2009 by explosives
Inta CHAYKA-Mast	196?	Russia	Inta	462 m (1,516 ft)	Guyed mast	65°57′59.54″N 60°18′33.45″E	
Central Mast of Imeretinskaya VLF-transmitter	?	Russia	Imeretinskaya	425 m (1,394 ft)	Guyed mast	44°46′24.93″N 39°32′50.32″E	
Chimney of GRES-2 Power Station	1987	Kazakhstan	Ekibastusz	419.7 m (1,377 ft)	Chimney (concrete)	52°1′26.5″N 75°28′34.5″E	Tallest chimney in the world
Kyiv TV Tower	1973	Ukraine	Kyiv	385 m (1,263 ft)	Tower (lattice steel)	50°28′16.49″N 30°27′11.97″E	Tallest lattice tower in the world
Tashkent Tower	1985	Uzbekistan	Tashkent	374.9 m (1,230 ft)	Tower (steel)	41°20′44.05″N 69°17′4.57″E	
Almaty Tower	1983	Kazakhstan	Alma-Ata	371.5 m (1,219 ft)	Tower (tubular steel)	43°13′43.26″N 76°58′34.77″E	Tallest steel tube tower in the world
Chimney of Berezovskaya GRES	1985	Russia	Sharypovo	370 m (1,210 ft)	Chimney (concrete)	55°34′45.65″N 89°04′23.21″E	Tallest chimney in Russia
Tambov TV Mast	1991	Russia	Tambov	369 m (1,211 ft)	Guyed mast	52°46′51.1″N 41°24′50.8″E	
Riga Radio and TV Tower	1986	Latvia	Riga	368.5 m (1,209 ft)	Tower (concrete)	56°55′26.08″N 24°08′13.26″E	
Sarepta transmitter, large mast	?	Kazakhstan	Sarepta	356 m (1,168 ft)	Guyed mast	49°41′48.75″N 72°25′59.5″E	
Străşeni TV Mast	1985	Moldova	Străşeni	355 m (1,165 ft)	Guyed mast	47°07′18.97″N 28°33′54.27″E	
Lipetsk TV Mast	1991	Russia	Lipetsk	354.6 m (1,163 ft)	Guyed mast	52°40′13″N 39°28′59″E	
TV Tower Vinnytsia	1961	Ukraine	Vinnytsia	354 m (1,161 ft)	Guyed mast	49°14′30.04″N 28°25′25.25″E	equipped with six crossbars running from the mast body to the guys
Sosnovy Longwave Radio Mast	?	Belarus	Sosnovy	353.5 m (1,160 ft)	Guyed mast	53°24′10.71″N 28°31′16.32″E	
Tsivilsk TV Mast	1990	Russia	Tsivilsk	350 m (1,150 ft)	Guyed mast	55°48′22″N 47°26′42″E	
Uchkizil TV Mast	1990	Uzbekistan	Uchkizil, Termez	350 m (1,150 ft)	Guyed mast	37°21′24.88″N 67°11′54.88″E	
Varaksino TV Mast	1988	Russia	Izhevsk	350 m (1,150 ft)	Guyed mast	56°52′13.44″N 53°03′03.02″E	
Smogiri TV Mast	1986	Russia	Smolensk	350 m (1,150 ft)	Guyed mast	55°02′08″N 32°22′52″E	
Sovetsky TV Mast	1984	Russia	Sovetsky, Mari El Republic	350 m (1,150 ft)	Guyed mast	56°45′17″N 48°32′05″E	
Chimney of Syrdarya Power Plant	1980	Uzbekistan	Shirin	350 m (1,150 ft)	Chimney (concrete)	40°13′49.06″N 69°05′55.97″E	
Kanevskaya TV Mast	1979	Russia	Kanevskaya	350 m (1,150 ft)	Guyed mast	46°03′27.18″N 38°57′57.43″E	
Livny TV Mast	1979	Russia	Livny	350 m (1,150 ft)	Guyed mast	52°27′03″N 37°30′10″E	
Stavropol TV Mast	1979	Russia	Stavropol	350 m (1,150 ft)	Guyed mast	45°00′44.04″N 41°51′11.54″E	
Ust-Kalmanka TV Mast	1979	Russia	Ust-Kalmanka	350 m (1,150 ft)	Guyed mast	52°09′51″N 83°18′08″E?	
Volga TV Mast	1978	Russia	Rybinsk	350 m (1,150 ft)	Guyed mast	57°57′53″N 38°21′14″E	
Novo-Bykovo TV Mast	1977	Russia	Vladimir	350 m (1,150 ft)	Guyed mast	56°01′10″N 40°50′25″E	
Rodniki TV Mast	1977	Russia	Rodniki	350 m (1,150 ft)	Guyed mast	57°05′27.05″N 41°42′33.4″E	
Tula TV Mast	1976	Russia	Tula	350 m (1,150 ft)	Guyed mast	54°8′27″N 37°35′03″E	
Yershov TV Mast	1974	Russia	Yershov	350 m (1,150 ft)	Guyed mast	51°21′51″N 48°17′58″E	
Ushachi TV Mast	1974	Belarus	Ushachi	350 m (1,150 ft)	Guyed mast	55°14′40.43″N 28°38′30.95″E	
Pinerovka TV Mast	1971	Russia	Balashov	350 m (1,150 ft)	Guyed mast	51°35′20″N 43°01′36″E	
Selizharovo TV Mast	1971	Russia	Selizharovo	350 m (1,150 ft)	Guyed mast	56°55′03″N 33°34′47″E	
Kolodischi TV Mast	1970	Belarus	Minsk	350 m (1,150 ft)	Guyed mast	53°57′40.5″N 27°46′42.08″E	
Lipin Bor TV Mast	1970	Russia	Lipin Bor	350 m (1,150 ft)	Guyed mast	60°21′27″N 37°55′15″E	
Mosolovo TV Mast	1968	Russia	Mosolovo	350 m (1,150 ft)	Guyed mast	54°16′17.9″N 40°33′26.34″E	
Galich TV Mast	?	Russia	Galich	350 m (1,150 ft)	Guyed mast	58°26′30″N 42°37′38″E	not in use so far
Belyy Yar TV Mast	?	Russia	Belyy Yar, Surgut	350 m (1,150 ft)	Guyed mast	61°16′6.93″N 73°14′9.45″E	
Polykovichi TV Mast	?	Belarus	Mahilyow/Polykovichi	350 m (1,150 ft)	Guyed mast	53°59′25.22″N 30°19′38.54″E	
Novaya Strazha TV Mast	?	Belarus	Slonim	350 m (1,150 ft)	Guyed mast	53°03′51″N 25°28′30″E	
Smetanichi TV Mast	?	Belarus	Smetanichi	350 m (1,150 ft)	Guyed mast	52°13′27.87″N 28°30′44.4″E	
Novaya TV Mast	?	Kazakhstan	Karaganda	350 m (1,150 ft)	Guyed mast	49°56′07.36″N 73°03′06.41″E	
Grigoriopol transmitter	?	Moldova	Mayak	350 m (1,150 ft)	Guyed mast	47°17′21.4″N 29°26′0.25″E	collapsed in 1997
Alexandrovsk-Sakhalinsky CHAYKA-Mast	?	Russia	Soboli	350 m (1,150 ft)	Guyed mast	51°4′42.805″N 142°42′4.952″E	
Petropavlovsk-Kamchatsky CHAYKA-Mast	?	Russia	Sokoch	350 m (1,150 ft)	Guyed mast	53°7′48.26″N 157°41′49.1″E	
Ussuriysk CHAYKA-Mast	?	Russia	Pad' Levaja	350 m (1,150 ft)	Guyed mast	44°31′58.24″N 131°38′28.6″E	
Koeru TV Mast	1976	Estonia	Koeru	349.5 m (1,147 ft)	Guyed mast	58°58′27.1″N 26°3′24.68″E	
Valgjärve TV Mast	1988	Estonia	Valgjärve	347 m (1,138 ft)	Guyed mast	58°5′49.93″N 26°40′41.81″E	
Proletariy TV Mast	1991	Russia	Novgorod	347 m (1,138 ft)	Guyed mast	58°26′55″N 31°43′24″E	
Salsk TV Mast		Russia	Salsk	336 m (1,102 ft)	Guyed mast	46°32′18.24″N 41°34′39.78″E	
Rogun Dam	-	Tajikistan	Rogun	335 m (1,099 ft)	Dam (mud)	38°50′28.6″N 69°55′5.9″E	under construction
Bobrov TV Mast	1976	Russia	Bobrov	331 m (1,086 ft)	Guyed mast	51°05′10″N 39°59′13″E	
Chimney of Kharkiv TEC-5	1991	Ukraine	Podvorky, Kharkiv Oblast	330 m (1,080 ft)	Chimney (concrete)	49°58′16.98″N 36°6′22.7″E	
3rd Chimney of Primorskaya GRES	1990	Russia	Luchegorsk	330 m (1,080 ft)	Chimney (concrete)	46°27′53.27″N 134°17′14.1″E	
Chimney of Novo-Angrenskaya Power Plant	1985	Uzbekistan	Olmaliq	330 m (1,080 ft)	Chimney (concrete)	40°55′20.6″N 69°48′59.54″E	
2nd Chimney of Gusinoozyorskaya GRES	1988	Russia	Gusinoozyorsk	330 m (1,080 ft)	Chimney (concrete)	51°18′0.51″N 106°28′45.5″E	
2 Chimneys of Permskaya GRES	1982/1990	Russia	Dobryanka	330 m (1,080 ft)	Chimney (concrete)	58°29′50″N 56°20′56″E; 58°29′53″N 56°20′42″E	
Ekibastuz GRES-1, Chimney East	1982	Kazakhstan	Ekibastuz	330 m (1,080 ft)	Chimney (concrete)	51°53′12.63″N 75°22′42.1″E	
Chimney of Zuevska thermal power station	1981	Ukraine	Zuhres, Donetsk Oblast	330 m (1,080 ft)	Chimney (concrete)	48°2′5″N 38°17′6.11″E	
Chimney of Cuciurgan power station	1980	Moldova	Dnestrovsc	330 m (1,080 ft)	Chimney (concrete)	46°38′24.9″N 29°56′16.9″E	
4th Chimney of Reftinskaya GRES	1979	Russia	Reftinskiy	330 m (1,080 ft)	Chimney (concrete)	57°6′31″N 61°42′27″E	
Mîndreştii Noi TV Mast	?	Moldova	Mîndreştii Noi	327 m (1,073 ft)	Guyed mast	47°43′46.17″N 28°1′56.25″E	
Vilnius TV Tower	1980	Lithuania	Vilnius	326.5 m (1,071 ft)	Tower (concrete)	54°41′13.64″N 25°12′53.12″E	
St. Petersburg TV Tower	1963	Russia	St. Petersburg	326 m (1,070 ft)	Tower (lattice steel)	59°58′35.86″N 30°19′15.04″E	
2 Chimneys of Kirishskaya GRES	1984/1986	Russia	Kirishi	320 m (1,050 ft)	Chimney (concrete)	59°29′25.7″N 32°3′11″E; 59°29′9.8″N 32°2′53.2″E	
2 Chimneys of Azerbaijan Thermal Power Plant	1981/1990	Azerbaijan	Mingachevir	320 m (1,050 ft)	Chimney (concrete)	40°46′50.94″N 46°59′14.05″E; 40°46′51.49″N 46°59′31.98″E	
3rd Chimney of Kostromskaya GRES	1980	Russia	Volgorechensk	320 m (1,050 ft)	Chimney (concrete)	57°27′19.1″N 41°10′25.4″E	
2 Chimneys of Ryazan Power Station	1973/1980	Russia	Novomichurinsk	320 m (1,050 ft)	Chimney (concrete)	54°02′03.98″N 39°46′39.17″E 54°02′03.39″N 39°46′57.57″E	
2 Chimneys of Zaporozhskaya GRES	1972/1977	Ukraine	Enerhodar	320 m (1,050 ft)	Chimney (concrete)	47°30′28.27″N 34°37′22.94″E; 47°30′23.99″N 34°37′39.78″E	
2 Chimneys of Vuhlehirska thermal power plant	1972/1975	Ukraine	Solncedar	320 m (1,050 ft)	Chimney (concrete)	48°27′55″N 38°12′18″E; 48°27′52″N 38°12′16″E	
Central Mast of Krasnodar RSDN-20 Transmitter	?	Russia	Poltavskaya	314 m (1,030 ft)	Guyed mast	45°24′12.43″N 38°09′29.33″E	
Central Mast of Novosibirsk RSDN-20 Transmitter	?	Russia	Bolotnoye	314 m (1,030 ft)	Guyed mast	55°45′30.74″N 84°26′45.28″E	
Tallinn TV Tower	1980	Estonia	Tallinn	314 m (1,030 ft)	Tower (concrete)	59°28′16.4″N 24°53′15.17″E	
TV Tower Yerevan	1977	Armenia	Yerevan	311.7 m (1,023 ft)	Tower (lattice steel)	40°10′16.7″N 44°32′11.49″E	
Azeri TV Tower	1996	Azerbaijan	Baku	310 m (1,020 ft)	Tower (concrete)	40°21′5.9″N 49°49′24.2″E	
Obninsk Meteorological tower	1958	Russia	Obninsk	310 m (1,020 ft)	Guyed mast	55°06′41.72″N 36°35′53.75″E	
Central Mast of Khabarovsk RSDN-20 Transmitter	?	Russia	Elban	308 m (1,010 ft)	Guyed mast	50°04′20.4″N 136°36′34″E	
Central Masts of Arkhangelsk VLF-transmitter	?	Russia	Lukovetskiy	305 m (1,001 ft)	Guyed mast	64°21′51.56″N 41°33′51.29″E; 64°21′20.36″N 41°34′44.45″E;64°21′16.06″N 41°33′15.6″E	3 masts
Vileyka VLF transmitter, central masts	1964	Belarus	Vileyka	305 m (1,001 ft)	Guyed mast	54°28′8″N 26°46′23.6″E; 54°27′30″N 26°46′13.4″E; 54°27′44″N 26°47′15.5″E	3 masts
Kamyshin TV Mast	?	Russia	Kamyshin	301.2 m (988 ft)	Guyed mast	50°07′36.58″N 45°24′20.25″E	
Chimney of Volzhskaya TEC-2	1988	Russia	Volzhsky	300.7 m (987 ft)	Chimney (concrete)	48°46′27.36″N 44°50′21.16″E	
Karachev CHAYKA transmitter, central mast	?	Russia	Karachev	300 m (980 ft)	Guyed mast	53°7′49.17″N 34°54′36.62″E	Mast used for a 1150 kW-transmitter of CHAYKA-chain GRI 8000
Ekibastuz GRES-1, Chimney West	1980	Kazakhstan	Ekibastuz	300 m (980 ft)	Chimney (concrete)	51°53′8.09″N 75°22′31.38″E	
Nurek Dam	1980	Tajikistan	Nurek	300 m (980 ft)	Dam (mud)	38°22′17.09″N 69°20′53.57″E	
Perm TV Tower	2016	Russia	Perm	300 m (980 ft)	Lattice tower	58°0′21.6″N 56°17′27″E	
Chimney of Bishkek TEC	1989	Kyrgyzstan	Bishkek	300 m (980 ft)	Chimney (concrete)	42°52′18.75″N 74°39′17.53″E	
Krasnoyarskaya TEC-3, Chimney 3	1991	Russia	Krasnoyarsk	283.2 m (929 ft)	Chimney (concrete)	56°6′34.19″N 93°05′41.14″E	
Large Chimney of Angarsk HPP-9	?	Russia	Angarsk	280.4 m (920 ft)	Chimney (concrete)	52°31′58.04″N 103°56′14.5″E	
Chimney of TEC-5	1983	Russia	Omsk	277.5 m (910 ft)	Chimney (concrete)	55°0′7.32″N 73°29′20.86″E	
Central Masts of Prometey VLF-Transmitter	?	Kyrgyzstan	Kayyngdy	276 m (906 ft)	Guyed mast	43°02′29.22″N 73°37′9.86″E; 43°01′50.94″N 73°37′1.31″E;43°02′15.61″N 73°36′20.35″E	3 masts
Chimney of TEC-6	1982	Ukraine	Kyiv	276 m (906 ft)	Chimney (concrete)	50°31′53.11″N 30°39′47.27″E	
Taldom transmitter	?	Russia	Taldom	275 m (902 ft)	Guyed mast	56°43′59.86″N 37°39′47.51″E	
Georgia Tbilisi TV Broadcasting Tower	1955	Georgia	Tbilisi	274.5 m (901 ft)	Tower (tubular steel)	41°41′44.76″N 44°47′4.94″E	
Measuring masts of Staratel Proving Ground		Russia	Nishnij Tagil	274 m (899 ft)	Guyed mast	57°51′39.05″N 60°21′35.28″E; 57°51′27.84″N 60°21′38.6″E	2 masts
Large Chimney of TEC-2 Volgodonsk	1989	Russia	Volgodonsk	274 m (899 ft)	Chimney (concrete)	47°29′46.25″N 42°12′38.31″E	
Chimneys of Surgut-2 Power Station	1986	Russia	Surgut	273 m (896 ft)	Chimney (concrete)	61°16′43.16″N 73°30′25.99″E; 61°16′43.33″N 73°30′39.2″E; 61°16′43.41″N 73°30′53.71″E	
Chimney of Talimarjan Power Plant	198?	Uzbekistan	Nuristan, Qashqadaryo Province	273 m (896 ft)	Chimney (concrete)	38°28′47.5″N 65°37′47.7″E	
Inguri Dam	1980	Georgia	Jvari	271.5 m (891 ft)	Dam (concrete)	42°45′33.49″N 42°1′52.02″E	Tallest arch dam in the world
Large Chimney of Nizhnevartovsk GRES		Russia	Izluchinsk	270 m (890 ft)	Chimney (concrete)	60°58′33.66″N 76°56′36.24″E	
Chimney 3 of Karmanovskaya GRES	1973	Russia	Yanaul	270 m (890 ft)	Chimney (concrete)	56°14′53.69″N 54°35′28.51″E	
Chimney of Hrazdan Thermal Power Plant-5	1990	Armenia	Hrazdan	270 m (890 ft)	Chimney (concrete)	40°33′55.1″N 44°44′45.4″E	
3rd Chimney of Tbilisi Thermal Power Station	1990	Georgia	Gardabani	270 m (890 ft)	Chimney (concrete)	41°28′9.04″N 45°03′41.68″E	
TEC Tobolsk, Chimney East	1986	Russia	Tobolsk	270 m (890 ft)	Chimney (concrete)	58°14′44.8″N 68°26′54.38″E	also used as electricity pylon
2nd Chimney of Stavropolskaya GRES	1983	Russia	Solnechnodolsk	270 m (890 ft)	Chimney (concrete)	45°18′45.01″N 41°30′42.55″E	
1st Chimney of Kostromskaya GRES	1970	Russia	Volgorechensk	270 m (890 ft)	Chimney (concrete)	57°27′36″N 41°10′36″E	
Large Chimney of Karagandinskaya TÈC-3	1978	Kazakhstan	Karaganda	270 m (890 ft)	Chimney (concrete)	49°55′0.84″N 73°14′14.2″E	
Vileyka VLF transmitter, ring masts	1964	Belarus	Vileyka	270 m (890 ft)	Guyed mast	54°28′27.64″N 26°46′28.73″E; 54°28′20.65″N 26°45′57.6″E; 54°28′15.49″N 26°46′54.57″E; 54°28′1.43″N 26°45′52.54″E; 54°27′49.28″N 26°46′18.46″E; 54°27′56.29″N 26°46′49.55″E; 54°28′3.28″N 26°47′20.62″E; 54°27′51.14″N 26°47′46.54″E; 54°27′31.94″N 26°47′41.44″E; 54°27′24.97″N 26°47′10.4″E; 54°27′37.14″N 26°46′44.51″E; 54°27′17.93″N 26°46′39.39″E; 54°27′10.94″N 26°46′8.28″E; 54°27′23.09″N 26°45′42.34″E; 54°27′42.31″N 26°45′47.44″E	15 masts
Odinsk Transmitter, Longwave Antenna South	?	Russia	Odinsk	269 m (883 ft)	Guyed mast	52°24′57.43″N 103°42′0.29″E	ARRT-antenna
Kirovsk TV Mast		Russia	Kirovsk	268.2 m (880 ft)	Guyed mast	67°36′6.78″N 33°38′51.49″E	
Atasu TV Mast		Kazakhstan	Atasu	268 m (879 ft)	Guyed mast	48°41′28.45″N 71°36′55.34″E	
2nd Chimney of Kurganskaya TEC	1987	Russia	Kurgan	267 m (876 ft)	Chimney (concrete)	55°24′36″N 65°13′52″E	
Stepnoye TV Mast		Russia	Stepnoye	266.4 m (874 ft)	Guyed mast	54°04′45″N 60°25′38″E	
Ust-Ishim TV Mast	1978	Russia	Ust-Ishim	266.4 m (874 ft)	Guyed mast		
3 Chimneys of Naberezhnochelninskaya TEC	1972/1978/1984	Russia	Naberezhnye Chelny	265 m (869 ft)	Chimney (concrete)	55°41′30.84″N 52°28′20.6″E; 55°41′27.36″N 52°28′26.81″E; 55°41′22.13″N 52°28′36.6″E	
Odinsk Transmitter, Longwave Antenna North	?	Russia	Odinsk	264 m (866 ft)	Guyed mast	52°26′10.37″N 103°41′9.5″E	ARRT-antenna
Petrivka Radio Mast	?	Ukraine	Petrivka	262 m (860 ft)	Guyed mast	46°59′36.37″N 30°53′48.38″E	
Birobidzhan longwave transmitter	1966	Russia	Birobidzhan	260 m (850 ft)	Guyed mast	48°44′19.37″N 132°48′3.95″E; 48°44′14.71″N 132°48′32.6″E	2 masts
Kruchina longwave mast	1971	Russia	Kruchina	260 m (850 ft)	Guyed mast	51°50′21.58″N 113°44′9.11″E	Insulated against ground (ARRT)-antenna
Large Chimney of TEC-5 Novosibirsk	1985	Russia	Novosibirsk	260 m (850 ft)	Chimney (concrete)	55°0′20.05″N 83°03′40.99″E	
Yaroslavl TV Mast	1989	Russia	Yaroslavl	260 m (850 ft)	Guyed mast	57°31′09.91″N 39°45′26.98″E	
Selenginsk transmitter	?	Russia	Selenginsk	260 m (850 ft)	Guyed mast	52°02′17.52″N 106°56′25.6″E	Guyed mast with ARRT-antenna for longwave broadcasting
Brovary Longwave Transmitter	1972	Ukraine	Brovary	259.6 m (852 ft)	Guyed mast	50°29′48.8″N 30°48′9.2″E	Insulated against ground (ARRT)-antenna
Gavar longwave mast	?	Armenia	Gavar	259.4 m (851 ft)	Guyed mast	40°25′32.68″N 45°12′16.15″E	Insulated against ground (ARRT)-antenna
Sosnovy transmitter, Mast East	?	Belarus	Sosnovy	259.1 m (850 ft)	Guyed mast	53°23′47.29″N 28°32′2.45″E	
Ashgabat Longwave Broadcasting Mast	?	Turkmenistan	Ashgabat	259 m (850 ft)	Guyed mast	37°51′14.84″N 58°21′58.74″E	ARRT-antenna
Razdolnoye transmitter, Longwave Mast	1965	Russia	Razdolnoye	259 m (850 ft)	Guyed mast	43°32′18″N 131°55′46″E	Guyed mast with ARRT-antenna for longwave broadcasting
Sarepta transmitter, medium mast	?	Kazakhstan	Sarepta	259 m (850 ft)	Guyed mast	49°41′48.82″N 72°24′54.08″E	
Krasne longwave transmitter	?	Ukraine	Krasne	259 m (850 ft)	Guyed mast	49°54′12.85″N 24°41′15.22″E	Guyed mast with ARRT-antenna for longwave broadcasting
Raduzhnyy longwave transmitter	?	Russia	Raduzhnyy	259 m (850 ft)	Guyed mast	59°42′51.14″N 150°11′29.9″E	ARRT-antenna
Bidzhan TV Mast	1985	Russia	Bidzhan	258.5 m (848 ft)	Guyed mast	47°58′59.77″N 131°54′33.3″E	
2nd Chimney of TEC-4	198?	Russia	Omsk	258.5 m (848 ft)	Chimney (concrete)	55°05′05.57″N 73°12′47.2″E	
Vestochka longwave transmitter	?	Russia	Yuzhno-Sakhalinsk	258 m (846 ft)	Guyed mast	46°50′35″N 142°53′44″E	
2nd Chimney of Zapadno-Sibirskaya TEC	198?	Russia	Novokuznetsk	257 m (843 ft)	Chimney (concrete)	53°52′42.8″N 87°14′3.7″E	
Taditoshan TV Mast	1976	Russia	Dalnerechensk	257 m (843 ft)	Guyed mast	46°02′56.37″N 134°00′12.39″E	
Bolshakovo Longwave Radio Mast	1974	Russia	Bolshakovo	257 m (843 ft)	Guyed mast	54°54′42.5″N 21°43′4.06″E	Guyed mast with ARRT-antenna for longwave broadcasting
Sitkunai transmitter, ARRT-Antenna	1964	Lithuania	Sitkunai	257 m (843 ft)	Guyed mast	55°02′36.97″N 23°48′46.55″E	Guyed mast with ARRT-antenna for mediumwave broadcasting
Krasny Bor transmitter, Mast 2	1961	Russia	Krasny Bor	257 m (843 ft)	Guyed mast		Guyed mast with ARRT-antenna for longwave broadcasting
Taldom transmitter, 153 kHz-Mast	?	Russia	Taldom	257 m (843 ft)	Guyed mast	56°45′30.04″N 37°37′12.17″E	
Koskovo transmitter	?	Russia	Koskovo	257 m (843 ft)	Guyed mast	64°21′50.92″N 41°24′41.8″E	Guyed mast with ARRT-antenna for longwave broadcasting
Zelenets transmitter	?	Russia	Zelenets	257 m (843 ft)	Guyed mast	61°49′09.34″N 50°41′26.42″E	Guyed mast with ARRT-antenna for longwave broadcasting
Avsyunino transmitter	?	Russia	Avsyunino	257 m (843 ft)	Guyed mast	55°35′13.75″N 39°09′57.84″E	Guyed mast with ARRT-antenna for longwave broadcasting
Surgut transmitter	?	Russia	Surgut	257 m (843 ft)	Guyed mast	61°23′35″N 72°53′20″E	Guyed mast with ARRT-antenna for longwave broadcasting
Oktjabrskij longwave transmitter	?	Russia	Oktjabrskij	257 m (843 ft)	Guyed mast	45°29′07.57″N 40°05′21.59″E	
Popova longwave transmitter	?	Russia	Popova	257 m (843 ft)	Guyed mast	50°39′16.75″N 136°54′46.9″E	
Murmansk longwave transmitter	?	Russia	Murmansk	257 m (843 ft)	Guyed mast	69°00′59.07″N 32°55′57.17″E	
Blagoveschensk longwave transmitter	?	Russia	Blagoveschensk	257 m (843 ft)	Guyed mast	50°30′23.58″N 128°18′32.9″E	
2nd Chimney of Kostromskaya GRES	1972	Russia	Volgorechensk	256 m (840 ft)	Chimney (concrete)	57°27′30″N 41°10′30.5″E	
AGP-Chimney		Kazakhstan	Temirtau	256 m (840 ft)	Chimney (concrete)	50°03′14.66″N 73°2′34.33″E	
Kingisepp TV Mast	?	Russia	Kingisepp	256 m (840 ft)	Guyed mast	59°22′55.88″N 28°34′43.46″E	
Troitsko-Pechorsk TV Mast	1979	Russia	Troitsko-Pechorsk	256 m (840 ft)	Guyed mast	62°43′25.69″N 56°05′52.33″E	
Yekaterinburg longwave transmitter	?	Russia	Yekaterinburg	256 m (840 ft)	Guyed mast	56°53′22.46″N 60°41′30.22″E	
Ternopil TV Mast	1979	Ukraine	Lozova	255 m (837 ft)	Guyed mast	49°36′48.28″N 25°41′20.97″E	
Raduga transmitter	?	Russia	Raduga	255 m (837 ft)	Guyed mast	55°29′16″N 83°41′28″E	Guyed mast with ARRT-antenna for longwave broadcasting
Yelizovo longwave transmitter	?	Russia	Yelizovo	255 m (837 ft)	Guyed mast	53°11′4.92″N 158°24′2.24″E	
Luga TV Mast	?	Russia	Luga	254.9 m (836 ft)	Guyed mast	58°43′01.26″N 29°51′07.7″E	
Sosnovy transmitter, Mast North	?	Belarus	Sosnovy	254.5 m (835 ft)	Guyed mast	53°24′37.7″N 28°32′33.69″E	
Grodno TV Tower	1984	Belarus	Grodno	254 m (833 ft)	Tower (lattice steel)	53°42′06″N 23°49′21″E	
Chimney of TEC Biysk	1977	Russia	Biysk	254 m (833 ft)	Chimney (concrete)	52°29′30.37″N 85°05′5.17″E	
Kohtla TV Mast	?	Estonia	Kohtla-Nõmme	254 m (833 ft)	Guyed mast	59°20′53.33″N 27°11′48.75″E	
Karaganda Transmitter	?	Kazakhstan	Karaganda	254 m (833 ft)	Guyed mast	49°47′32.41″N 73°01′40.18″E	2 masts
Dovolnoye TV Mast		Russia	Dovolnoye	253.9 m (833 ft)	Guyed mast	54°27′42.25″N 79°39′19.56″E	
Naystenjarvi TV Mast	1991	Russia	Naystenjarvi	253.25 m (830.9 ft)	Guyed mast	62°18′43.35″N 32°40′44.38″E	
Nakhodka TV Mast	1992	Russia	Nakhodka	253 m (830 ft)	Guyed mast	42°50′58.09″N 132°50′50.8″E	
Ocher TV Mast	?	Russia	Ocher	253 m (830 ft)	Guyed mast	57°54′27″N 54°45′14″E	
Volgograd mediumwave transmitter	?	Russia	Volgograd	253 m (830 ft)	Guyed mast	48°40′32.84″N 44°24′17.27″E	
Chimneys of Karagandinskaya TÈC-2		Kazakhstan	Temirtau	253 m (830 ft)	Chimney (concrete)	50°02′46.35″N 73°3′13.65″E; 50°02′49.59″N 73°3′9.16″E	
Volochysk TV Mast	1976	Ukraine	Volochysk	252 m (827 ft)	Guyed mast		
Kastsyukovichy TV Mast	?	Belarus	Kastsyukovichy	252 m (827 ft)	Guyed mast	53°20′4.65″N 32°01′45.71″E	
Nazyvaesk TV Mast		Russia	Nazyvaesk	252 m (827 ft)	Guyed mast	55°33′39.11″N 71°19′4.34″E	
Chimneys of Eesti Power Plant	1973	Estonia	Auvere	251.5 m (825 ft)	Chimney (concrete)	59°16′23.01″N 27°53′59.29″E; 59°16′26.46″N 27°54′13.81″E	
Large Chimney of Kazakh Steel Mill power station		Kazakhstan	Temirtau	251.5 m (825 ft)	Chimney (concrete)	50°02′49.32″N 73°1′21.92″E	
Large Chimney of Aksuskaya GRES		Kazakhstan	Aksu	251.5 m (825 ft)	Chimney (concrete)	52°07′14.44″N 76°52′29.64″E	
New Chimney of Kuznetskaya TEC	198?	Russia	Novokuznetsk	251 m (823 ft)	Chimney (concrete)	53°46′2″N 87°14′51.2″E	
2nd Chimney of Volzhskaya TEC-1	197?	Russia	Volzhsky	251.5 m (825 ft)	Chimney (concrete)	48°49′29.21″N 44°49′5.26″E	
Dedovichi TV Mast	1982	Russia	Dedovichi	250 m (820 ft)	Guyed mast	57°32′24.17″N 29°58′29.01″E	
Taranivka Radio Mast	1965	Ukraine	Taranivka	250 m (820 ft)	Guyed mast	49°38′8.77″N 36°07′26.23″E	mast radiator insulated against ground for mediumwave broadcasting
Chkalovskoe TV Mast (РТПС Чкаловское )	1989	Russia	Chkalovskoe	250 m (820 ft)	Guyed mast	44°50′04.23″N 133°01′55.23″E	
Efremov TV Mast	1989	Russia	Yefremov	250 m (820 ft)	Guyed mast	53°08′0.67″N 38°06′14.14″E	
Aleksandrov Gay TV Mast	1987	Russia	Aleksandrov Gay	250 m (820 ft)	Guyed mast	50°12′01.26″N 48°36′06.46″E	
Perelyub TV Mast	1987	Russia	Perelyub	250 m (820 ft)	Guyed mast	51°53′17.83″N 50°10′21.45″E	
Galievka TV Mast	1983	Russia	Boguchar	250 m (820 ft)	Guyed mast	49°59′26.34″N 40°37′29.29″E	
Chimney of Vilnius 3 Power Plant	198?	Lithuania	Vilnius	250 m (820 ft)	Chimney (concrete)	54°40′3.94″N 25°09′21.23″E	
Krasnoyarsk GRES-2, Chimney 4	1981	Russia	Zelenogorsk	250 m (820 ft)	Chimney (concrete)	56°8′59.85″N 94°28′42.32″E	
Chimney 2 of Moscow Cogeneration Plant 23	1980	Russia	Moscow	250 m (820 ft)	Chimney (concrete)	55°49′14.3″N 37°46′15.45″E	
2 Chimneys of Nizhnekamskaya TEC-2	1978/1982	Russia	Nizhnekamsk	250 m (820 ft)	Chimney (concrete)	55°34′39.22″N 51°56′36.77″E; 55°34′39.18″N 51°56′42.89″E	
Chimney of TEC-2	1978	Russia	Lipetsk	250 m (820 ft)	Chimney (concrete)	52°34′16″N 39°41′36″E	
Balakovo TV Mast	1977	Russia	Balakovo	250 m (820 ft)	Guyed mast	52°04′22.7″N 47°44′53.99″E	
4th Chimney of Troitskaya GRES	1976	Russia	Troitsk, Chelyabinsk Oblast	250 m (820 ft)	Chimney (concrete)	54°2′12.55″N 61°39′5.64″E	
Chimney 1 of Moscow Cogeneration Plant 23	1975	Russia	Moscow	250 m (820 ft)	Chimney (concrete)	55°49′13.97″N 37°46′22.51″E	
Ibresi TV Mast	1974	Russia	Ibresi	250 m (820 ft)	Guyed mast	55°16′06.08″N 46°59′35.49″E	
Selivanovo TV Mast	1976	Russia	Valuyki	250 m (820 ft)	Guyed mast	50°18′46.65″N 38°11′2.69″E	
1st Chimney of Stavropolskaya GRES	1974	Russia	Solnechnodolsk	250 m (820 ft)	Chimney (concrete)	45°18′41.81″N 41°30′41.39″E	
2 Chimneys of Reftinskaya GRES	1972/1975	Russia	Reftinskiy	250 m (820 ft)	Chimney (concrete)	57°6′32″N 61°42′28″E	No.2, No.3
2 chimneys of Kurakhove TES	1972	Ukraine	Kurakhove	250 m (820 ft)	Chimney (concrete)	47°59′40.05″N 37°14′9.96″E; 47°59′40.05″N 37°14′15.83″E	No.5, No.6
3 Chimneys of Novocherkassk Power Plant	1970/1971/1972	Russia	Novocherkassk	250 m (820 ft)	Chimney (concrete)	47°23′39.95″N 40°13′48.68″E; 47°23′59.18″N 40°13′51.29″E; 47°23′57.65″N 40°13′56.56″E	No.2, No.3, No.4
2 Chimneys of Ladyzhinska Power Station	1970/1971	Ukraine	Ladyzhin	250 m (820 ft)	Chimney (concrete)	48°42′22.48″N 29°13′4.39″E; 48°42′19.31″N 29°13′10.28″E	
3 Chimneys of Lukoml power station	1969/1971/1973	Belarus	Novolukoml	250 m (820 ft)	Chimney (concrete)	54°40′51.34″N 29°8′5.27″E; 54°40′47.59″N 29°8′6.51″E; 54°40′44.55″N 29°8′8.98″E	also used as electricity pylons
Simferopol CHAYKA-transmitter	1969	Ukraine	Plodove	250 m (820 ft)	Guyed mast	44°53′20.21″N 33°52′23.98″E; 44°53′25.41″N 33°52′17.78″E; 44°53′24.55″N 33°52′31.4″E; 44°53′14.86″N 33°52′30.24″E; 44°53′15.78″N 33°52′16.6″E	5 masts
2 Chimneys of Elektrenai Power Plant	1968/1973	Lithuania	Elektrenai	250 m (820 ft)	Chimney (concrete)	54°46′12.71″N 24°38′48.24″E; 54°46′9.23″N 24°38′48.08″E	one chimney also used as electricity pylon
2 Chimneys of Zmiivska TES	1968/1969	Ukraine	Komsomolske	250 m (820 ft)	Chimney (concrete)	49°35′11.44″N 36°31′29.04″E; 49°35′9.84″N 36°31′39.86″E	No.4, No.5
4 Chimneys of Kryvorizka TES	1967/1970/1971/1973	Ukraine	Zelenodolsk	250 m (820 ft)	Chimney (concrete)	47°32′35.39″N 33°39′32.78″E; 47°32′30.17″N 33°39′32.47″E	
2 Chimneys of Slovyanska Power Plant	1967/1971	Ukraine	Slovyansk	250 m (820 ft)	Chimney (concrete)	48°52′13.3″N 37°45′58.28″E; 48°52′22.44″N 37°46′6.93″E	No.5, No.6
2 Chimneys of Burshtynska TES	1967/1969	Ukraine	Burshtyn	250 m (820 ft)	Chimney (concrete)	49°12′30.97″N 24°39′57.3″E; 49°12′27.33″N 24°40′2.57″E	No.2, No.3; also used as electricity pylons
2 Chimneys of Kashirskaya GRES	1966/1983	Russia	Kashira	250 m (820 ft)	Chimney (concrete)	54°51′24.5″N 38°15′32.95″E; 54°51′23.93″N 38°15′23.24″E	one of them also is used as electricity pylon
Large Chimney of Iriklinskaya GRES		Russia	Energetik	250 m (820 ft)	Chimney (concrete)	51°45′12.55″N 58°48′22.14″E	also used as electricity pylon
Kirs TV Mast	1980	Russia	Kirs	250 m (820 ft)	Guyed mast	59°19′28.37″N 52°16′13.29″E	
Pachelma TV Mast	1981	Russia	Pachelma	250 m (820 ft)	Guyed mast	53°20′28.85″N 43°18′18.67″E	
Zarinsk TV Mast	1985	Russia	Zarinsk	250 m (820 ft)	Guyed mast	53°41′41.88″N 84°54′21.64″E	
Chimney of TEC Sterlitamak	?	Russia	Sterlitamak	250 m (820 ft)	Chimney (concrete)	53°40′1.07″N 55°53′5.12″E	
Large Chimney of Konakovo Power Station	?	Russia	Konakovo	250 m (820 ft)	Chimney (concrete)	56°44′31.47″N 36°46′17.5″E	
Azovstal TEC Chimney	1984	Ukraine	Mariupol	250 m (820 ft)	Chimney (concrete)	47°5′23.4″N 37°35′18.94″E	
Large Chimneys of Nadekdinskiy Metallurgical Factory		Russia	Norilsk	250 m (820 ft)	Chimney (concrete)	69°19′38.19″N 87°57′39.04″E; 69°19′44.4″N 87°58′0.71″E	
3 Chimneys of Luhanskaya GRES	1967/1968/1969	Ukraine	Schastye	250 m (820 ft)	Chimney (concrete)	48°44′52.13″N 39°15′39.25″E; 48°45′0.13″N 39°15′44.62″E; 48°45′4.3″N 39°15′48.91″E	
Chimney of Starooskolskii elektrometallurgicheskiy kombinat	?	Russia	Stary Oskol	250 m (820 ft)	Chimney (concrete)		
3rd chimney of Balakovo Thermal Power Plant	1983	Russia	Balakovo	233.5 m (766 ft)	Chimney (concrete)	51°58′32.05″N 47°47′6.28″E	
Azanka TV Mast	?	Russia	Tavda	250 m (820 ft)	Guyed mast	58°01′44″N 64°46′12″E	
Troitskoye TV Mast	?	Russia	Troitskoye	250 m (820 ft)	Guyed mast	49°22′21.31″N 136°35′15.5″E	
Vologda TV Mast	planned	Russia	Vologda	250 m (820 ft)	Guyed mast	59°12′32″N 39°49′50″E	
Volokolamsk TV Mast	?	Russia	Volokolamsk	250 m (820 ft)	Guyed mast	56°02′38.38″N 36°06′17.5″E	
Uni TV Mast	?	Russia	Uni	250 m (820 ft)	Guyed mast	57°47′43.37″N 51°24′17.66″E	
Zheleznogorsk TV Mast	?	Russia	Zheleznogorsk	250 m (820 ft)	Guyed mast	?	
Kletskaya TV Mast	?	Russia	Kletskaya	250 m (820 ft)	Guyed mast	49°18′14.17″N 43°02′33.9″E	
Cahul TV Mast	?	Moldova	Cahul	250 m (820 ft)	Guyed mast	45°56′06.25″N 28°16′33.78″E	
Aldan-Lebedinyy TV Mast	?	Russia	Lebedinyy	250 m (820 ft)	Guyed mast	58°30′0.65″N 125°31′23.4″E	
Blagodatka TV Mast	?	Russia	Blagodatka	250 m (820 ft)	Guyed mast	53°06′04″N 46°25′52″E	
Kokuy TV Mast	?	Russia	Kokuy	250 m (820 ft)	Guyed mast	52°12′39″N 117°29′36″E	
Visaginas TV Mast	?	Lithuania	Visaginas	250 m (820 ft)	Guyed mast	55°36′39.79″N 26°25′53.05″E	
Slonim CHAYKA-transmitter	?	Belarus	Slonim	250 m (820 ft)	Guyed mast	53°07′52.49″N 25°23′36.22″E; 53°08′2.68″N 25°23′32.21″E; 53°07′58.14″N 25°23′51.06″E; 53°07′45.91″N 25°23′49.59″E; 53°07′42.85″N 25°23′29.5″E; 53°07′53.28″N 25°23′18.61″E	6 masts
Syzran CHAYKA-transmitter	?	Russia	Balasheyka	250 m (820 ft)	Guyed mast	53°17′18.12″N 48°06′50.72″E; 53°17′7.72″N 48°06′52.39″E; 53°17′15.83″N 48°07′7.83″E; 53°17′26.01″N 48°06′39.11″E; 53°17′13.97″N 48°06′34.74″E; 53°17′27.12″N 48°06′59.66″E	6 masts
Karachev CHAYKA transmitter, ring masts	?	Russia	Karachev	250 m (820 ft)	Guyed mast	53°7′44.12″N 34°54′44.38″E;53°7′44.46″N 34°54′28.25″E;53°7′54.18″N 34°54′28.8″E;53°7′53.84″N 34°54′44.93″E	4 masts, used for a 1150 kW-transmitter of CHAYKA-chain GRI 8000
Petrozavodsk CHAYKA-transmitter	?	Russia	Pryazha	250 m (820 ft)	Guyed mast	61°45′31.1″N 33°41′30.42″E;61°45′25.8″N 33°41′21.28″E;61°45′35.43″N 33°41′19.39″E;61°45′26.69″N 33°41′41.61″E	5 masts
Pankratiev Island CHAYKA-transmitter	?	Russia	Pankratiev Island	250 m (820 ft)	Guyed mast	76°07′34″N 60°12′55″E	
Grigoriopol transmitter	?	Moldova	Maiac	250 m (820 ft)	Guyed mast	47°17′19.31″N 29°26′47.28″E	collapsed in 1997

== Very tall structures of unknown height ==
There are some facilities in Russia and other parts of former Soviet Union, which may use permanent man-made structures taller than 250 metres. As some of them are of military importance, no height data are currently available. These facilities include the following stations:

- Alpha transmitter Revda (68°02′8″N 34°41′00″E)
- Alpha transmitter Seyda (39°28′16″N 62°43′07″E)
- Chimneys of Rustavi Metallurgical Plant (2 chimneys – an estimate over 200 m high)

If one could find out the height of the mentioned structures, then put them in the upper list, if the height is greater than 250 metres.

== Tall structures characteristic for former Soviet Union ==
There are several types of tall structures, which were either only or mainly built in the former Soviet Union.

=== Stalinistic skyscrapers ===
Skyscrapers built during Stalin's last years (1947–1953) in an elaborate combination of Russian Baroque and Gothic styles (see Seven Sisters (Moscow)). Similar buildings less tall were built in several other cities in the former Soviet Union.

Building	City	Height		Year of built
Moscow State University	Moscow	787 ft	240 m	1953
Hotel Ukraine	Moscow	650 ft	198 m	1955
Building on Kotelnicheskaya Embankment	Moscow	577 ft	176 m	1952
Ministry of Foreign Affairs	Moscow	564 ft	172 m	1953
Kudrinskaya Square	Moscow	525 ft	160 m	1954
Hotel Leningradskaya	Moscow	446 ft	136 m	1953
Red Gate Square	Moscow	436 ft	133 m	1953

=== Guyed Masts with crossbars ===
Between 1960 and 1965 in several cities in Russia and Ukraine guyed masts with crossbars running from the mastbody to the guys were built. All these masts, which are known as 30107 KM, are exclusively used for UHF-/VHF-transmission (mainly FM-/TV-transmission) and have a closed tubular mast body.

City	Country	Year built	Height		Number of crossbar levels	Number of crossbars	Coordinates
Vinnytsia	Ukraine	1961	1161 ft	354 m	2	3	49°14′30.04″N 28°25′25.25″E
Orenburg	Russia	1961	656 ft	200 m	2	3	51°46′18.09″N 55°06′58.06″E
Kryvyi Rih	Ukraine	1960	607 ft	198 m	2	3	47°54′42.42″N 33°25′5.91″E
Vladikavkaz	Russia	1961	650 ft	198 m	2	3	43°00′55.99″N 44°41′10.47″E
Barnaul	Russia	1962	648 ft	197.5 m	2	3	53°18′8.48″N 83°46′4.7″E
Pervomaysk	Ukraine	?	643 ft	196 m	2	3	48°04′01.24″N 30°51′29.36″E
Izhevsk	Russia	1962	640 ft	195 m	2	3	56°52′19.05″N 53°09′50.05″E
Yuzhno-Sakhalinsk	Russia	1963	597 ft	182 m	2	4	46°56′59.47″N 142°45′1.53″E
Saransk	Russia	1961	591 ft	180 m	2	4	54°11′11.98″N 45°08′49.32″E
Biysk	Russia	1965	591 ft	180 m	2	4	52°32′53.76″N 85°11′45.64″E
Arkhangelsk	Russia	1964	495 ft	151 m	2	3	64°32′47.16″N 40°30′55.83″E
Kaliningrad	Russia	1962	495 ft	151 m	2	3	54°43′41.81″N 20°29′39.86″E
Veselovka	Russia	1965	495 ft	151 m	2	3	54°35′32.35″N 22°00′47.02″E

=== Hyperbolic towers built by Shukhov ===
Vladimir Shukhov built between 1900 and 1930 several hyperbolic lattice towers for different uses at several places.

Tower	City	Height		Year of built
Shukhov Tower	Moscow	525 ft	160 m	1922
Dzerzhinsk High-Voltage Mast	Dzerzhinsk	420 ft	128 m	1929

=== Other ===
In nearly all larger towns in the former Soviet Union, there is a characteristic lattice tower of type 3803 KM, which is used for FM- and TV-broadcasting.

Some thermal power stations in the area of the former Soviet Union have at least one chimney, which is also used as electricity pylon. Although such objects were also realized in areas outside the former Soviet Union, nearly all structures of this type exist in countries, which were part of the former Soviet Union (see list at Chimney#Chimneys used as electricity pylon).

== See also ==
- List of tallest buildings in Moscow
- List of tallest structures in Central Asia
- List of tallest buildings in Kazakhstan
- List of tallest structures in Turkmenistan
- List of tallest buildings in Asia
