= ARRT =

ARRT may refer to:

- American Registry of Radiologic Technologists
- ARRT-Antenna
- ARrt
- Autonomous Rail Rapid Transit
