= Krasny Bor transmitter =

Coordinates: 59°39′45.30″N 30°41′25.34″E

Krasny Bor transmitter is a large facility for longwave, mediumwave and shortwave broadcasting at Krasny Bor near Saint Petersburg, Russia. Krasny Bor transmitter was established in 1961 and belongs to the most powerful broadcasting stations in the world. It uses four mast radiators and several shortwave antennas. The tallest of these mast radiators is a 271.5 metres high guyed mast, which is equipped with a cage antenna and used for longwave broadcasting. It was built in 2002 as replacement for a 257.5 metres tall guyed mast, destroyed at a helicopter collision, which killed 6 people, on November 5, 2001. Further, there is a 257 metres tall mast radiator, which is insulated against ground and equipped with a cage antenna for medium wave broadcasting, a 106 metres tall steel tube mast radiator carrying several cage antennas in multiple levels and a 93 metres tall guyed mast radiator.

Broadcasting from Krasny Bor was discontinued on January 1, 2013.

== Transmission frequencies ==
Frequency	Power
234 kHz	1200 kW
549 kHz	100 kW
801 kHz	1000 kW
1494 kHz	1000 kW

== See also ==
- List of tallest structures in the former Soviet Union
