= Bolshakovo transmitting station =

Broadcasting station

Coordinates: 54.903°N 21.696°E

The Bolshakovo transmitting station is a transmission centre for AM radio located near Bolshakovo in the enclave of Kaliningrad, Russia. It was used to broadcast radio station Voice of Russia to the west on medium wave, and has long wave and short wave broadcasting facilities. The medium wave services opened in 1974 and closed in 2007.

The station was built during the Soviet Union and broadcast Radio Moscow, the official international broadcasting station of the USSR. After the fall of the Soviet Union, in 1993, the station was renamed Voice of Russia.

The Bolshakovo site was used to broadcast on the medium wave frequencies of 1116 kHz and 1386 kHz with a power of 2,500 kW. In the 1990s the 1386kHz frequency was contested between Russia and Lithuania. It was allocated to Lithuania in the 1978 Geneva Plan for international broadcasting, but in 1978 Lithuania was part of the Soviet Union. On November 1, 2007, Russia ceased using the frequency of 1386 kHz.

The site is also reported to have had long wave and shortwave transmitters. The longwave transmission was Radio Rossii on 171kHz. This ended on 9 January 2014. In 2014 shortwave Digital Radio Mondiale (DRM) digital broadcasts were coming from Bolshakovo on 6100kHz, 6125kHz, and 9625kHz.

One set of antennas was an SV4+4 ARRT-Antenna with eight guyed masts, which were 257 metres (843 ft) tall.

It has been reported that the centre was re-opened in 2022 with temporary broadcasts on 549 kHz, 1143kHz and 1215 kHz.

== See also ==
- List of tallest structures in the former Soviet Union
