= 30107 KM =

Russian broadcasting standard

30107 KM is the designation of Russian-built guyed tubular masts for FM-/TV-broadcasting, which were built in the first half of the 1960s at different places in Russia and Ukraine. The 30107 KM-mast has normally a 151 or 182.5 metres high mast body with a wall diameter of 16 – 10 mm, and exists in versions guyed in three and four directions.

Its most unusual feature however, which gives it its characteristic look are the crossbars equipped with a gangway with railing, which run in two levels from the mast structure to each outmost guy. These crossbars are used for oscillation damping of the structure and are used for the installation of antennas.

In the former Soviet Union, guyed tubular masts for broadcasting without these crossbars were also built. However such masts are not something special as such structures also exist in Germany, the Czech Republic, Slovakia, France, the United Kingdom, Japan, South Korea, Austria, Sweden, Slovenia and Poland.

== 30107 KM-masts with crossbars ==
City	Country	Year built	Height		Number of crossbar levels	Number of crossbars	Coordinates
Vinnytsia	Ukraine	1961	1161 ft	354 m	2	3	49°14′30.04″N 28°25′25.25″E
Orenburg	Russia	1961	656 ft	200 m	2	3	51°46′18.09″N 55°06′58.06″E
Kryvyi Rih	Ukraine	1960	607 ft	198 m	2	3	47°54′42.42″N 33°25′5.91″E
Vladikavkaz	Russia	1961	650 ft	198 m	2	3	43°00′55.99″N 44°41′10.47″E
Barnaul	Russia	1962	648 ft	197,5 m	2	3	53°18′8.48″N 83°46′4.7″E
Pervomaysk	Ukraine	?	643 ft	196 m	2	3	48°04′01.24″N 30°51′29.36″E
Izhevsk	Russia	1962	640 ft	195 m	2	3	56°52′19.05″N 53°09′50.05″E
Yuzhno-Sakhalinsk	Russia	1963	597 ft	182 m	2	4	46°56′59.47″N 142°45′1.53″E
Saransk	Russia	1961	591 ft	180 m	2	4	54°11′11.98″N 45°08′49.32″E
Biysk	Russia	1965	591 ft	180 m	2	4	52°32′53.76″N 85°11′45.64″E
Arkhangelsk	Russia	1964	495 ft	151 m	2	3	64°32′47.16″N 40°30′55.83″E
Kaliningrad	Russia	1962	495 ft	151 m	2	3	54°43′41.81″N 20°29′39.86″E
Veselovka	Russia	1965	495 ft	151 m	2	3	54°35′32.35″N 22°00′47.02″E

== Other guyed masts with tubular body in the former Soviet Union ==
City	Country	Year built	Height		Coordinates	Remarks
Obninsk	Russia	1958	310 m	1017 ft	55°06′41.72″N 36°35′53.75″E	Meteorological mast
Vileyka	Belarus	1964	305 m	1001 ft	54°28′8″N 26°46′23.6″E; 54°27′30″N 26°46′13.4″E; 54°27′44″N 26°47′15.5″E	3 masts, insulated against ground
Nizhny Novgorod	Russia	1952	204 m	669 ft	56°10′20.07″N 43°55′37.89″E; 56°10′24.16″N 43°56′23.67″E; 56°10′0.08″N 43°56′7.05″E	3 masts, insulated against ground
Melitopol	Ukraine	2004	200 m	656 ft	46°49′8.15″N 35°20′11.16″E	
Kursk	Russia		200 m	656 ft	51°45′28.87″N 36°7′41.53″E	
Leninogorsk	Russia		196 m	643 ft	54°34′22.7″N 52°23′51.09″E	
Chita	Russia	1963	194.5 m	638 ft	52°3′3.34″N 113°31′0.17″E	
Pskov	Russia	1962	192 m	630 ft	57°48′42.22″N 28°16′40.56″E	
Serov	Russia		192 m	630 ft	59°37′41.85″N 60°34′15.94″E	
Atyuryevo	Russia		185 m	607 ft	54°19′24.88″N 43°21′23.56″E	
Rubtsovsk	Russia	1966	180 m	591 ft	51°32′58.79″N 81°13′40.9″E	
Belgorod	Russia	1959	180 m	591 ft	50°34′34.76″N 36°34′49.57″E	
Chusovoy	Russia		180 m	591 ft	58°19′28.86″N 57°50′12.84″E	
Atbasar	Kazakhstan		150 m	492 ft	51°47′31.62″N 68°26′47.27″E	
Cherkessk	Russia		137 m	449 ft	44°15′49.5″N 42°6′31.97″E	
Baranchinskiy	Russia		127 m	417 ft	58°7′50.42″N 59°37′47.91″E	
Anatolskaya	Russia		106 m	449 ft	57°41′22.13″N 60°10′9.2″E	
Merefa	Ukraine		106 m	449 ft	49°48′28.74″N 36°2′9.61″E	
Bila Tserkva	Ukraine		77 m	253 ft	49°48′48.79″N 30°8′27.72″E	
