= Zarya (antenna) =

A Zarya antenna (Cyrillic: Заря) is a special type of directional mediumwave broadcasting antenna consisting of a long straight row of grounded lattice towers with a height of approximately 50 metres in a distance of 100 metres. These towers carry the antenna wire.

Three types of Zarya antennas are used at most larger AM broadcasting facilities in the former Soviet Union. They use the same configuration but different length values, which are 1500, 2500 and 3500 metres.

== See also ==
- ARRT-Antenna
