= Odinsk =

Odinsk Одинск
- Village
- Location within Irkutsk Oblast Location within Russia
- Coordinates: 52°27′N 103°43′E
- Country: Russia
- Region: Irkutsk Oblast
- District: Angarsky District
- Time zone: UTC+8:00

Odinsk (Russian: Одинск) is a rural locality (a selo) in Angarsky District, Irkutsk Oblast, Russia. Population: 917 (2010 census);

== Geography ==
This rural locality is located 15 kilometres (9.3 mi) from Angarsk (the district's administrative centre), 42 kilometres (26 mi) from Irkutsk (capital of Irkutsk Oblast) and 4,494 kilometres (2,792 mi) from Moscow. Novoyasachnoye is the nearest rural locality.
