= Veselovka TV Mast =

Coordinates: 54°35′30″N 22°0′49″E

Veselovka TV Mast (Russian: РТПЦ Веселовка) is a 151-metre-tall (495 ft) guyed tubular steel mast for FM and TV transmission near Veselovka in Kaliningrad Oblast in Russia. Veselovka TV Mast was built in 1965 and is from the somewhat unusual structural type 30107 KM. It is equipped with six crossbars equipped with gangways, which run in two levels from the mast structure to the guys.

== Radiated programs ==
=== OIRT-Band ===
Programm	Frequency	TRP
Radio Rossia	65.90 MHz	4 kW
	67.46 MHz	4 кW
	68.24 MHz	4 кW
	68.99 MHz	500 W
	69.89 MHz	4 kW
	70.31 MHz	500 W
	73.61 MHz	1 kW

=== Standard FM ===
Program	Frequency	TRP
	106.6 MHz	1 kW

=== TV ===
Program	Frequency	Channel number	TRP
Первый канал	189.25 MHz	7	5 kW
Россия / ГТРК Янтарь	210.25 MHz	10	5 kW
план цифра	471.25 MHz	21	1 kW
Euronews	543.25 MHz	30	5 kW
	583.25 MHz	35	20 kW
	623.25 MHz	40	5 kW
	655.25 MHz	44	1 kW
цифра заявка	679.25 MHz	47	20 kW
	703.25 MHz	50	1 kW
цифра	751.25 MHz	56	20 kW
	759.25 MHz	57	20 kW
