= Sosnovy, Russia =

Sosnovy Сосновый
- Settlement
- Location within Arkhangelsk Oblast Location within Russia
- Coordinates: 62°18′N 44°46′E
- Country: Russia
- Region: Arkhangelsk Oblast
- District: Verkhnetoyemsky District
- Time zone: UTC+3:00

Sosnovy (Russian: Сосновый) is a rural locality (a settlement) in Verkhnetoyemskoye Rural Settlement of Verkhnetoyemsky District, Arkhangelsk Oblast, Russia. The population was 245 as of 2010. There are 5 streets.

== Geography ==
Sosnovy is located 21 km northwest of Verkhnyaya Toyma (the district's administrative centre) by road. Larionovskaya is the nearest rural locality.
