= Strășeni TV Mast =

Architectural structure in Moldova

Coordinates: 47°07′18.50″N 28°33′55.07″E

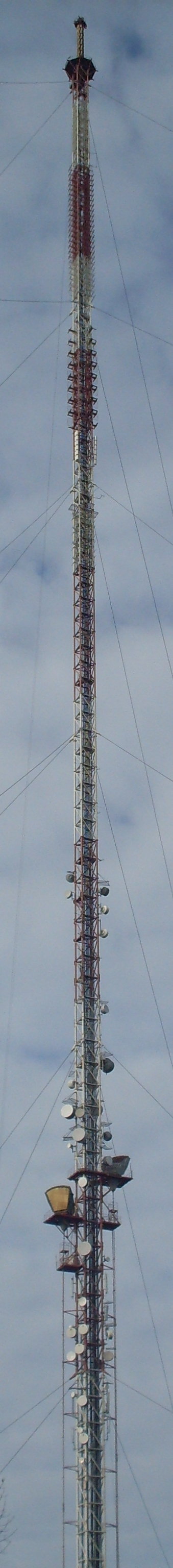
General view

Străşeni TV Mast is one of the tallest architectural structures in Europe and the tallest in Moldova. It was built in 1984–85, and is a 355-meter (1165') tall guyed mast (lattice steel structure with square cross section) situated near Străşeni in Moldova used for FM radio and TV broadcast.

== Broadcasting programs ==
=== TV ===
Program	Channel number	Frequency	Polarization	Max. dBW	Output, real / max
Moldova 1	3	77.25 MHz	horiz.	59,6	40 kW/50 kW
2 Plus (Antena 1)	11	215.25 MHz	horiz.	51,8	40 kW/50 kW
Euro-TV Chisinau	23	487.25 MHz	horiz.	55,5	1 kW
Prime (Perviy Kanal)	30	543.25 MHz	horiz.	57,8	20 kW
NIT (TVCi)	48	687.25 MHz	horiz.	55,5	1 kW

=== Radio ===
Program	Frequency	Polarization	Max. dBW	Output, real / max
Antena C	67,58	horiz.	42,3	4 kW
RFE/RL	68,48	horiz.		4 kW
Radio Moldova	100,5	horiz.	43,0	4 kW
Vocea Basarabiei	102.3	horiz.	40	1 kW / 4 kW
Radio France International	107,3	horiz.	40,0	1 kW / 4 kW
