= Reftinskaya GRES =

Power station in Sverdlovsk, Russia

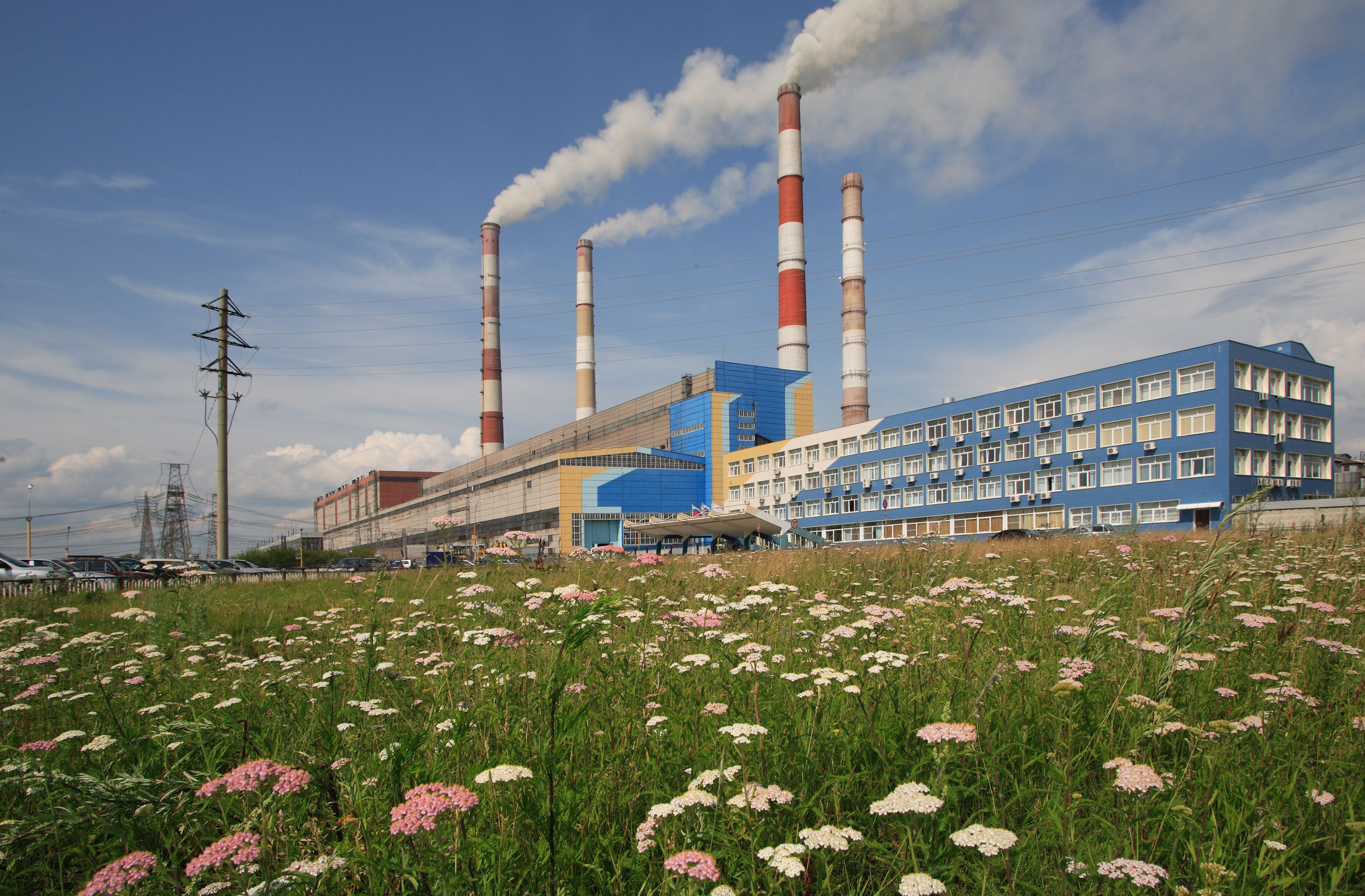
Reftinskaya GRES

Reftinskaya GRES is the largest solid fuel thermal power plant in Russia. It is situated in Sverdlovsk Oblast, 100 km north-east of Yekaterinburg and 18 km from Asbest. Reftinskiy town, which is home to 18,000 people, is situated 2.5 km from the GRES, which produces 20,000 million KWh annually. It has a total installed capacity of 3,800 and heat power 350 GKh. Coal from Ekibastuz's coal field (16,3 МJ/kilo of calorific value, ash content for moisture-free fuel is 43,3 %) is used as the main fuel and the black oil is used as the starting fuel. GRES produces power with the bar «Outdoor switchgear -500 kV» on five power lines -500 kV and with the bar «Outdoor switchgear -220 kV» on five power lines -220 kV. The station supplies power to the industrial areas in Sverdlovsk, Tyumen, Perm and Chelyabinsk regions. The construction of the electric power station was started in 1963, the launching of the first power unit took place in 1970 and the last one in 1980.

== History ==
The building of the electric power plant was started in 1963 and it was realized in 2 lines: first, 6 power units with installed capacity of 300 MW with the direct-flow two-furnace boilers with rating 950 ton/hour were launched and secondly – 4 power units with installed capacity of 500 MW with the direct-flow two-furnace boilers with rating 1650 ton/hour.

Reftinskaya GRES uses coal supplied from Ekibastuz that has calorific power of 3800–4100 cal/kg, ash content for moisture-free fuel of 40–43% and humidity of 6–9%.

On 3d July, 1963 the group of the formers landed in the suburbs of Asbest and, getting through the taiga jungle, went to research the ground for the building of electric power station that ought to become the leader of the ural energy providers. In the same year Yurii Yelovikov hammered the first peg on the territory of the Reftinskaya GRES.

The building of electric power station was one of the most important construction in the region, thus Sverdlovsk regional committee headed by B.Yeltsin controlled its realization.

The design work of the Reftinskaya GRES was given to the Ural branch of industry institute “Teploenergoproject”. The collective of the institute has been developing from the implementation of the electrification plan and projected all electro stations of the Great Ural, accumulated big experience. The most successful technological decisions of that period and of the whole world were entered in the project of the Reftinskaya GRES.

In March, 1967 the first cubic meter of the concrete for the main building's base was placed. The process of building achieved a good pace of work. One by one objects of the first unit, which had power of 300 MW, came to life.

After the series of control and testing of boiler and turbine, the first unit was plugged in on 24 December 1970.and immediately started to work fully operational. The principle of the unit's maximum work after the building was preserved on all next 9 units with the installed capacity of 300–500 MW that would annually be launching until the out of planned production capacity in 1980.

Unit No. 1 was taken for the exploitation on 28 December 1970 by the state commission under the chairman of V. Trachyk. the counting of the electro station's vital activity started definitely from this moment. Units No.2 and No.3 were taken for exploitation in 1971. unit No.4 was introduced The following year. In September 1974 unit No.5 was introduced. And in May 1975 unit No.6 was introduced. The power of the electric station reached 1800 MW.

It was not profitable To continue the building of the units with the installed capacity of 300 MW. The decision to enlarge Reftinskaya GRES due to “pyatisotka” was taken.

Literally by one year the base of all 4 objects was prepared. Hardly had the unit No.7 been accepted by state commission in the end of 1977, when the butt-end's steel-work of the eighth unit got up. The next units No.8 and No.9 with the capacity of 500 MW were correspondingly introduced in the end of 1978 and 1979. The last (tenth) power unit was launched on 21 December 1980. And on 22 December 1980 in the occasion of the GRES building termination and achievement of the final planned production capacity of 3800 MW, the mass meeting took place, where the first secretary of the Sverdlovsk regional committee C.P.S.U. B. Yeltsin congratulated power men and presented governmental rewards more than 200 constructors, fitters, operatives. The rank of the Hero of Socialist Labour was appropriated to the Chef of the Reftinskaya GRES Building Government I. Volfson It was the first time in the country when on the coal-dust unit of 500 MW at Reftinskaya GRES was introduced the automated control system in 1997. So the conception of reconstruction and development of automated control system of country electric power stations, which was cultivated in Sverdlovenergo, started to be realized. Fundamentally new, unprecedented on coal-dust units technology made work place of machinist more comfortable (panels were replaced by 8 monitors) and supplied personnel with the great quantity of information.

The part of produced on Reftinskaya GRES energy from the total volume of energy, consumed by Sverdlovsk Oblast, contains nearly 40%. Relatively, almost every second electric light bulb in the Sverdlovsk Oblast's households works on the electricity, generated by Reftinskaya GRES. The electric power station provides with electricity consumers from Ural region with the power output of Economic Cooperation Organization of Russia.

On 24 September 2008 at 07:05 GRES generated 700-billionth kWh of energy. In 2010 public audition in the case of the transition GRES on shot line ash removal took place. The administration of the station got claims of absence of the ecological examination of the project and pedaling o administrative resource, in view of the potential environmental pollution.

The chimney No. 4 of Reftinskaya GRES with the height of 330 meters is one of the highest chimneys in the world.

Reftinskaya GRES has been in operation by JSC Kuzbassenergo since July 1, 2020 after being transferred from Enel.

== Features of the equipment ==
=== Fuel supply ===
The delivery of the coal from ekabastuz's field is realized by railroad transportation within a distance of 1400 km. The supply of fuel for units with installed capacity of 300 and 500 MW is autonomous. The plan of fuel supply includes car dumper, belt conveyor system, which are situated in underground galleries and aerial flyovers, units of pouring, crushing case. Productivity of every fuel supply is ton/hour. A way of coal supply from store to production is realized by a bulldozer. There are 4 containers of 16000 m³ for keeping mazut at GRES.

=== Technical water supply ===
An integral cooling system is circulating with cooling pond and usage of low-level intake. The square of the pond is 25 km^{2}. Power of the water recycling system is 12,2 million m/day.

=== Hydraulic ash removing system ===
Ash removal system is reserved, hydraгlic, with the transportation of ash and slag through ashlines and ash dumps. The ash dump No. 2 with the square of 1008 hectare is in the exploitation.

The ash dump No. 1 with the square of 440 hectare is taken out of action and completely recultivated. The unique project of ash dump recultivation on Reftinskaya GRES was completed in 2007. For the first time in Russia, using the unique method of tree-planting, land of 440 hectare was returned to nature. As a result of cooperative work between scientists of UrS RAS's botanical garden, Institute of plants and animals ecology, Sykholozhskii forestry and powermen of Reftinskaya GRES on recultivation (i.e. reproduction of natural resources) of ash dump on the place, where waste was thrown down, pines of 3 metres grow.

Now the recultivation of ash dump No.1 is a new pine wood guarded by Sykholozhskii forestry of the Sverdlovsk Region Department of forestry. In 2008 the recultivation of ash dump No.1 on Reftinskaya GRES was recognized as the best ecological project of the year. This premium was established by Ministry of Nature of Russian Federation, the project won in nomination of «Nature conservation technologies».

=== Dry Ash Removal System ===
The Dry Ash Removal System is launched of Tenova Takraf. September 29, 2015 – Enel Russia has today inaugurated the Dry Ash Removal System at Reftinskaya GRES one of its most significant environmental projects – and the only one of its kind in the Russian power generation sector. Overall, Enel Russia invested over 12.5 billion roubles in the project. For the first time in Russia, the traditional hydraulic treatment of the ash produced by a coal plant as a waste material, has been replaced by the new, dry method of transportation and storage. This new method will allow increase industrial use of ash: as long as it remains dry, it can be used in road construction, building materials, agriculture etc. The new Dry Ash Removal System is connected to the railway, which makes it possible to ship the dry ash to clients both by rail and by road. DARS potentially allows the shipping to clients of all of the ash produced by the power plant, namely up to five million tonnes per year. All ash that is not immediately requested by clients, is transported by a 4.5 km-long closed pipe conveyor belt to the ash lagoon, where ash stacks are levelled and compressed, preventing dry ash from blowing away. Finally, a layer of loam is applied to the stack surface, and green grass is seeded.

The dry ash method enables significant reduction of water usage and the volume of stored ash, making it possible to keep using the existing Ash Lagoon N2 of Reftinskaya GRES for the next 35 years, preserving new land plots and saving hundreds of hectares of forest from being cut down. The DARS project of Reftinskaya GRES was carried out within the framework of the Environmental Agreement that was signed by Enel Russia and the Government of the Sverdlovsk Region at the INNOPROM industrial exhibition in 2011. Earlier in 2015 Enel Russia announced the completion of the 99.9%-efficient fabric filters at three out of ten power units of Reftinskaya GRES, which are also part of the Environmental Agreement.

=== Water treatment ===
Water treatment is realizing by the chemical water treatment with the productivity on Na-cationiozated water of 100 t/hour, on desalted water – 340 t/hour.

Demineralizing plant works according to the scheme: liming and coagulation in clarifiers, filtration in mechanical filters, single-stage desalting for replenishment of heating system, triple-stage desalting for the filling of water and steam in cycle of GRES. A condensate of turbines is purified on modular demineralizing systems according to the schema: de-ironing through electromagnetic filter with the following filtration on mixing action filters – prefilter and general.

=== Fish protection system ===
Late in 2016 a fish protection device was commissioned at Reftinskaya GRES.

The fish protection device mode of operation is based on creation of a water-and-air screen in front of deep water intakes of the power plant. When a water-and-air mix is created, acoustic oscillations with a wide frequency range are generated thus ensuring intensive acoustic effect – a signal of biological danger for fish fry. Physical protection is used as well: fish fry is moved into areas where no water is taken to the plant. Acoustic and mechanical protection does not cause any damage to fish, but scares fish away and prevents them from getting into an open feeder and filter screens of onshore pumping stations at Reftinskaya GRES. Fish protection devices save at least 70% of fish fry measuring 12mm and over.

In May 2016 it was the initiative of Reftinskaya GRES to put more than 70 thousand of young sterlets into the water reservoir.

=== Control and administration system ===
Control and administration of the work of units in 300 and 500 MW is realizing from modular control panes – one pane for every two units, where regulation devices of the general and supplement equipment work are carried out.

The automized system of administration of technological processes on the base of computing machine СМ-2М, СМ-2, М-6000 and informational machines М-60 was launched and АСУ ТП Siemens Simatic was launched on the units number 6 and 10Gas-purification Historically, gas-purification from ash realized through electro filters.

On May, 13 Enel Russia inaugurated the modernized 500 MW Unit 7 at the Reftinskaya GRES coal-fired plant after a large-scale environmental retrofitting. For the first time in Russia fabric filters were installed at a power plant. The filters will lead to a reduction in ash emissions from Unit 7 by roughly 99.9%, equivalent to the saving of up to more than 10,000 tons of emissions per year. The project was implemented within the framework of Enel Russia's Environmental Program, as part of the Agreement for Environmental Cooperation signed by Enel Russia and the Government of the Sverdlovsk Region in 2011. Unit 7 modernization operation have helped improve reliability and efficiency of the overall unit, as well as considerably decreasing the heat rate. Within the retrofitting, alongside the installation of fabric filters, namely 16,800 ash-catching bags that achieve the best filtration of the flue gases, a new generator was installed at Unit 7. Moreover, both the gas ducts and the sealing system of the regenerative air preheater were modernized, resulting in a decrease of air flows from the air section of the preheater to the gas section by 2.5-3 times that leads to a lower rate of own electricity use and a significant increase in the boiler's efficiency.

On July, 11 within the framework of «INNOPROM-2015» International Industry Trade Fair Enel Russia announced that two more power units – No. 4 and No. 5 – at coal-fired Reftinskaya power plant had been equipped with fabric filters. The installation of modern fabric filters at 300 MW Units No. 4 and No. 5 will lead to a reduction in ash emissions from the units by roughly 99.9%, equivalent to the saving of up to over 30,000 tons of emissions per year for the two units, which together with the Unit 7 allows to save about 40,000 tons of emissions per year for the three retrofitted units at Reftinskaya GRES. The modernization implied cutting-edge technologies, many of which are used in Russia for the first time. At each of the retrofitted 300 MW power units 14,600 ash-catching bags that achieve the best filtration of the flue gases have been installed replacing the obsolete electrostatic precipitators, which implied dismantling of roughly 3,000 tons of metal works. At Unit 5, the modernization works included installation of low-emission burners, which would allow to significantly reduce NOx emissions. Alongside the environmental impact, the retrofitting works at No. 4 and No. 5 have helped to improve reliability and efficiency of the units.

=== Gas treatment system ===
Late in 2017 power unit No.1 of Reftinskaya GRES was equipped with a new gas treatment system which helps the modern electrostatic precipitators prevent emission of 13k ton of ashes/ year into the atmosphere. In order to ensure the optimal exhaust gas treatment, the modern Russian electrostatic precipitators were installed which have high-frequency power devices and a new control system. It allows increasing the efficiency of ash particle trapping, online controlling of voltage and electrode purge frequency, thus ensuring the equipment reliability.

== Accidents ==
On 20 December 2006 took place the biggest accident of Reftinskaya GRES's story. Due to fire, unit No. 10 with installed capacity of 500 MW was destroyed, unit No. 9 was damaged and capacity of the station temporarily decreased on 27% %. On 28 March 2008 unit No. 10 was relaunched in exploitation.
