= Strășeni =

- Municipality
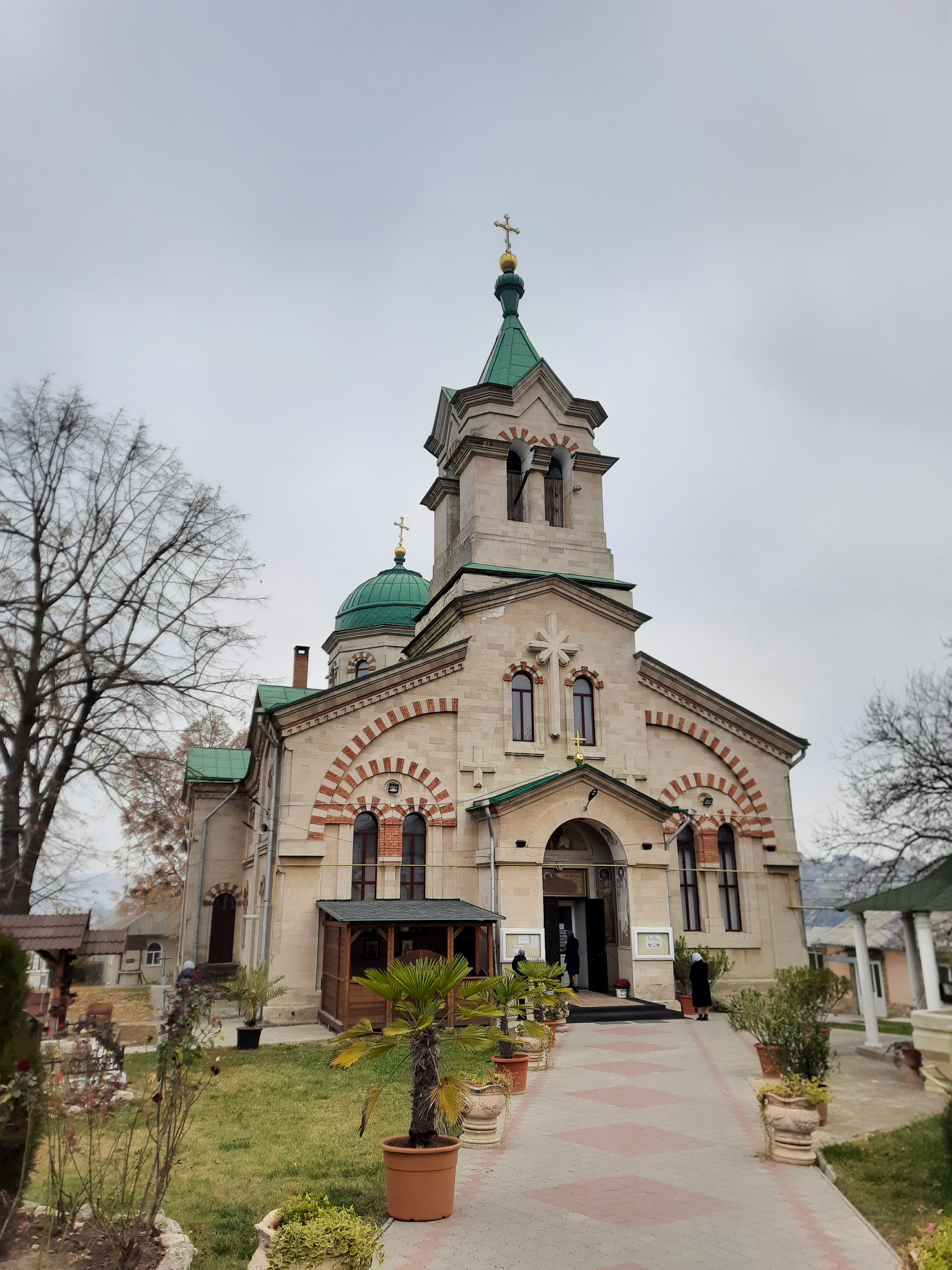
- Saint Paraskeva church in Strășeni

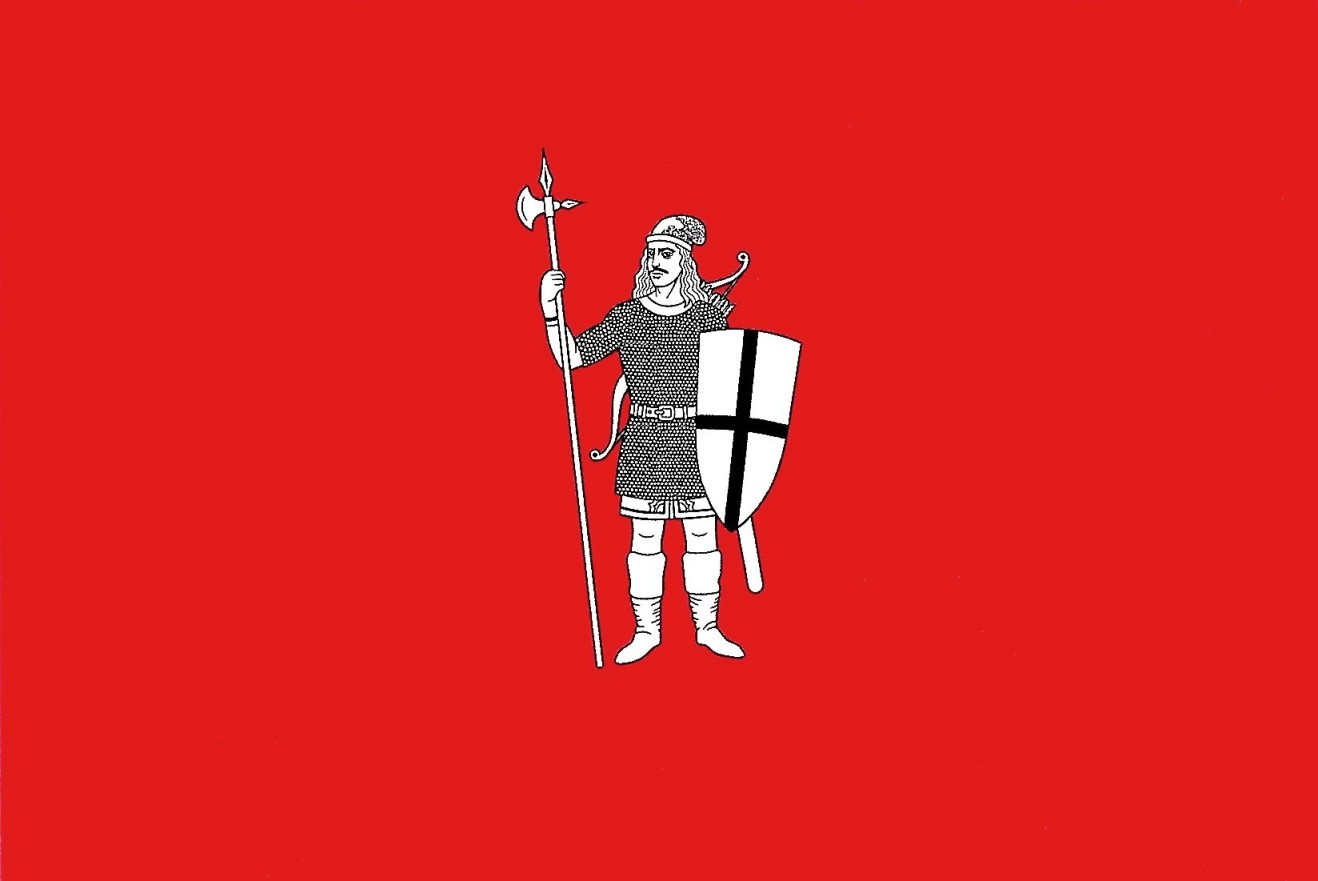
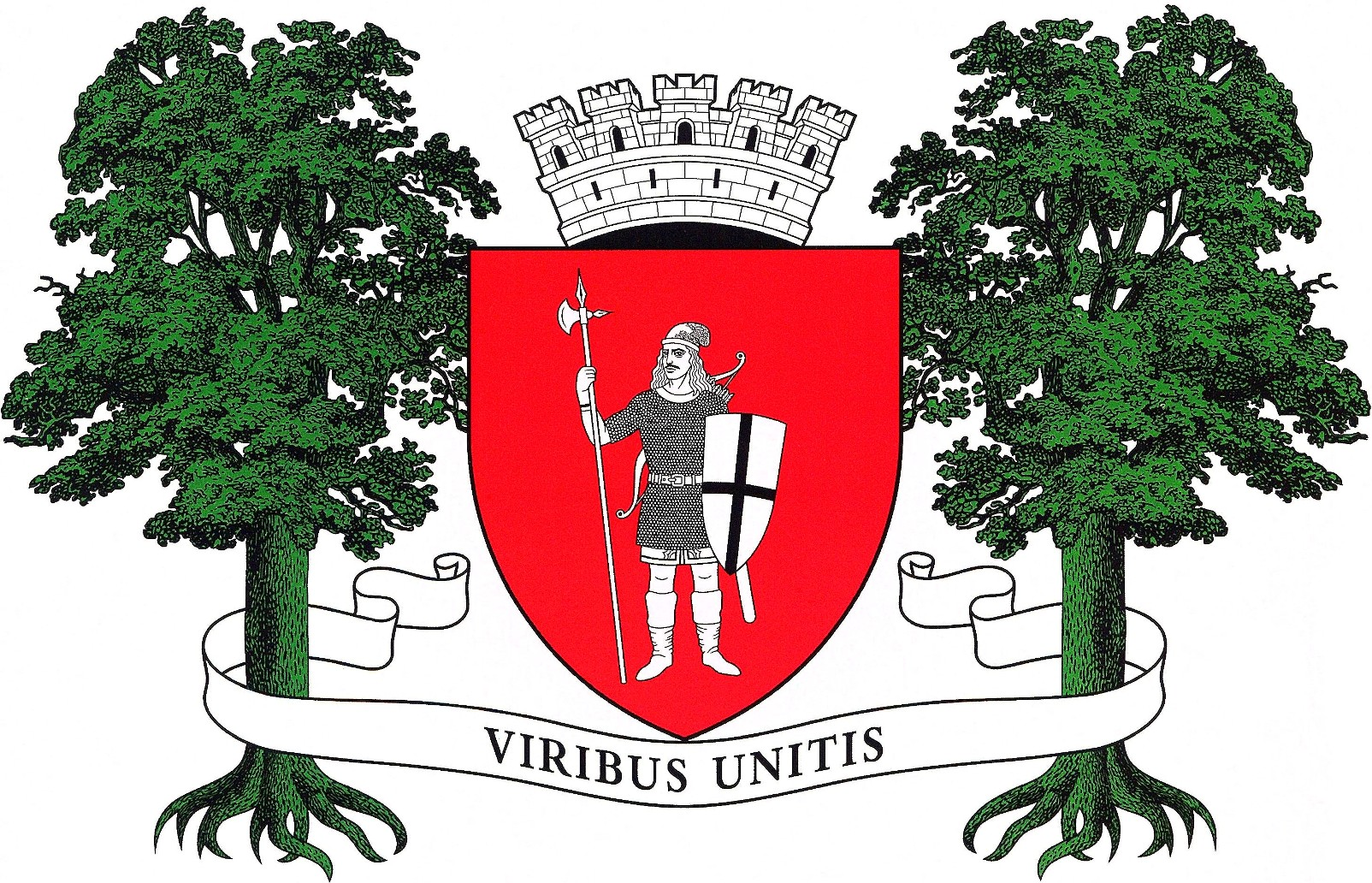
- Flag Seal
- Interactive map of Strășeni
- Location within Moldova
- Coordinates: 47°08′N 28°37′E
- Country: Moldova
- County: Strășeni District

Government
  - Mayor: Valentina Casian (Independent)
- Elevation: 236 m (774 ft)

Population (2024)
  - Total: 14,497
- Time zone: UTC+2 (EET)
  - Summer (DST): UTC+3 (EEST)
- Climate: Dfb
- Website: Official website

Strășeni (Romanian pronunciation: [strəˈʃenʲ]) is a city and municipality of about 20,000 inhabitants in central Moldova, the administrative center of Strășeni District. The city administers one village, Făgureni.

There are several legends about its name. One tells that the name of the region is derived from strașnic, a Romanian adjective that can mean "scary", "terrible", and the story goes that in former times this region was covered by a fearsome forest.

Nowadays, Strășeni is famous for its wine. The Strășeni vineyard, 12 kilometres (7.5 mi) west of Chișinău, is renowned for its sparkling white wines. A little farther north is the Romănești winery, one of the largest locally and the one-time leading producer of wines in the USSR. One of its more famous products is a Bordeaux-type red.

== Demographics ==
According to the 2024 census, 14,497 inhabitants lived in Strășeni, a decrease compared to the previous census in 2014, when 18,376 inhabitants were registered.

Ethnic composition of Strășeni (2024)
1. Moldovans (Note: There is an ongoing controversy regarding the ethnic identification of Moldovans and Romanians.) (82.4%)
2. Romanians (14.0%)
3. Russians (1.60%)
4. Ukrainians (1.20%)
5. Others (0.50%)
Linguistic composition of Strășeni (2024)
1. Romanian (50.9%)
2. Moldovan (Note: In March 2023, the Parliament of Moldova passed a law updating all legislative texts and the constitution to refer to the national language as Romanian, effectively rendering the term "Moldovan" obsolete.) (44.0%)
3. Russian (4.20%)
4. Ukrainian (0.60%)
5. Other (0.30%)

Historical population
Year	Pop.	±%
1930	5,054	—
1970	13,385	+164.8%
1979	15,307	+14.4%
1989	20,119	+31.4%
2004	19,090	−5.1%
2014	18,376	−3.7%
2024	14,497	−21.1%

== Media ==
- Vocea Basarabiei 102.3

== Points of interest ==
- Strășeni TV Mast, a 355-metre (1,165 ft) tall, guyed mast for FM radio and TV broadcasting built in 1984–85.

== Twin towns and sister cities ==
- Onești, Romania (2015)
