= ARRT-Antenna =

Common type of antenna on Soviet AM broadcasting sites

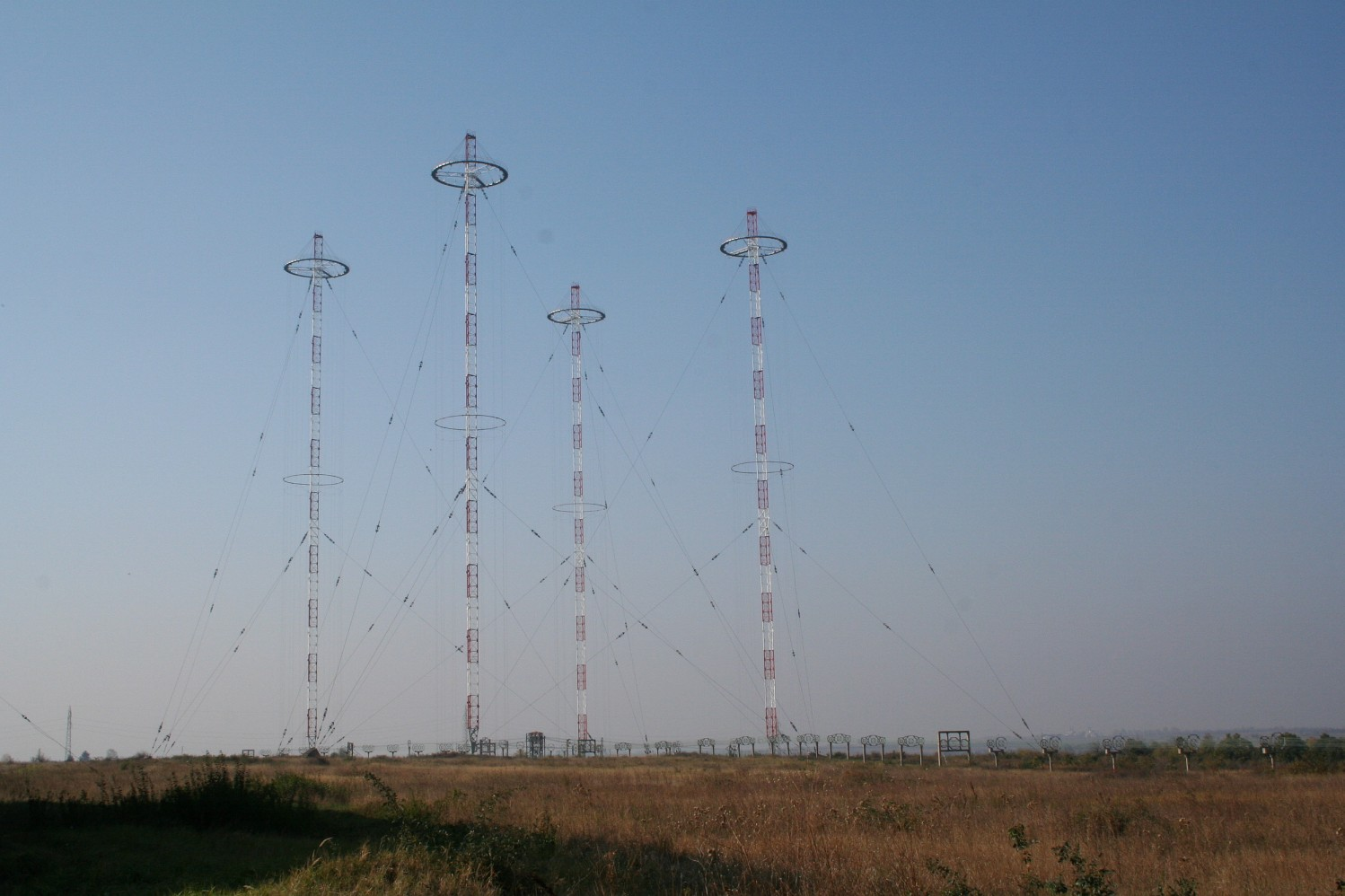
MW Antenna Vidin (Bulgaria)- ARRT Typ

An ARRT-Antenna (Cyrillic: АРРТ) is the designation of a common type used on many AM broadcasting sites in former Soviet Union, Bulgaria and Albania. It consists of a cage antenna which is mounted around the lower parts of a mast radiator insulated against ground and insulated from the mast. The mast and the cage antenna are fed separately. The ARRT-antenna allows a radiation pattern with less skywave radio propagation and is more easily realizeable than a mast divided by insulators.

A variant of ARRT-antennas uses a grounded mast and a cage antenna reaching from the bottom to the top of the mast. Such antennas are used e.g. at the mediumwave masts of Bolshakovo transmitter.

== See also ==
- Zarya
