= Cage aerial =

Type of radio antenna

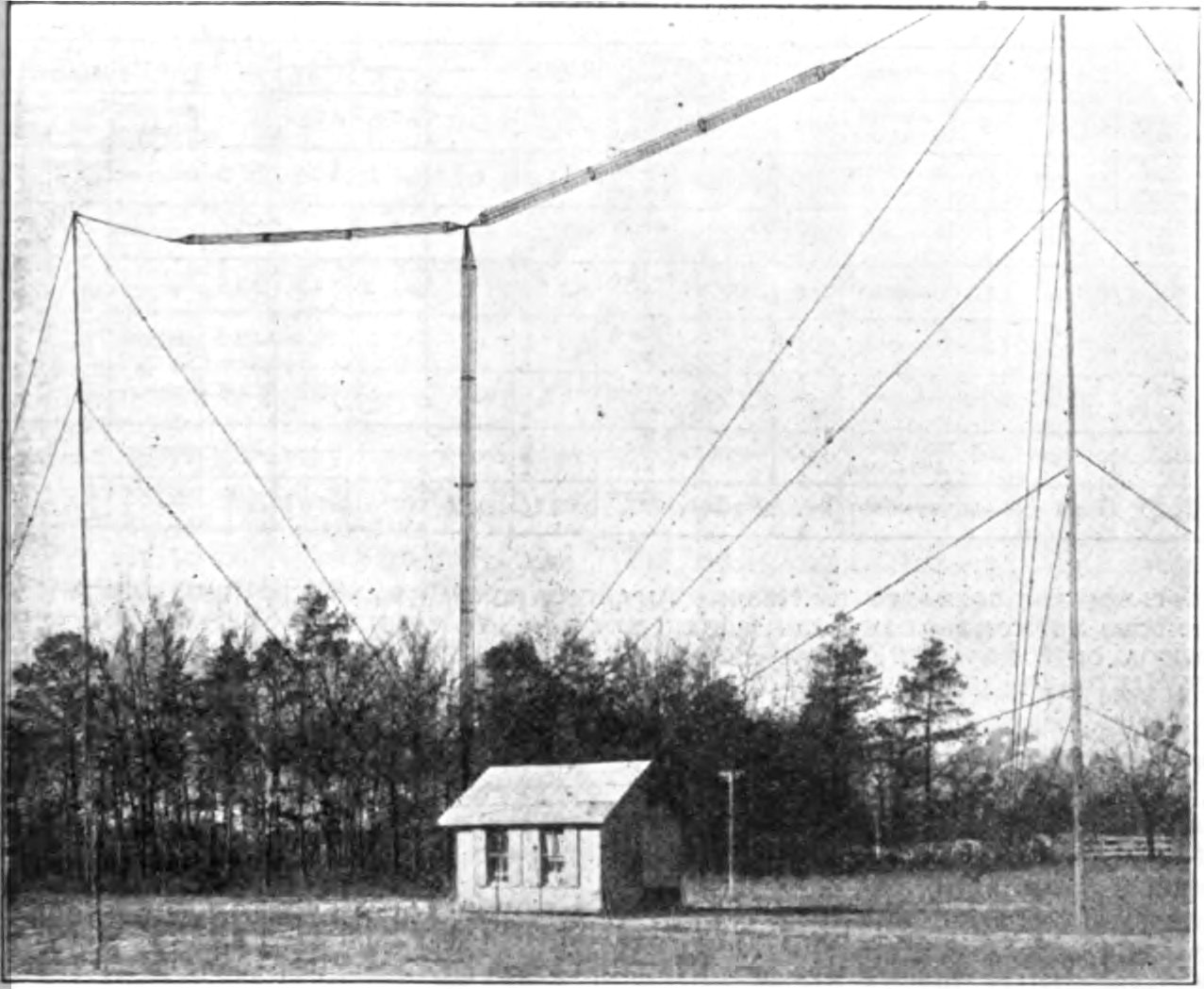
Historic Radio Engineers Club station, Riverhead, New York, in 1922; a cage T-antenna 60 ft high by 90 ft long. The conductor is made of a "cage" of 6 wires held apart by wooden spreaders; this increased capacitance and decreased ohmic resistance. This antenna achieved transatlantic contacts on 1.5 MHz, at a power of 440 W.

A cage antenna (British cage aerial) is a radio antenna where a conventional design has been augmented by replacing a single long conductor with several parallel wires, connected at their ends, and held in position by ring spacers or support struts mounted on a central mast (if any). The "cage" is either mounted around a central mast (either conducting or non-conducting) or suspended from overhead wires.

== Examples ==
A few examples of aerials made of cage sections are:

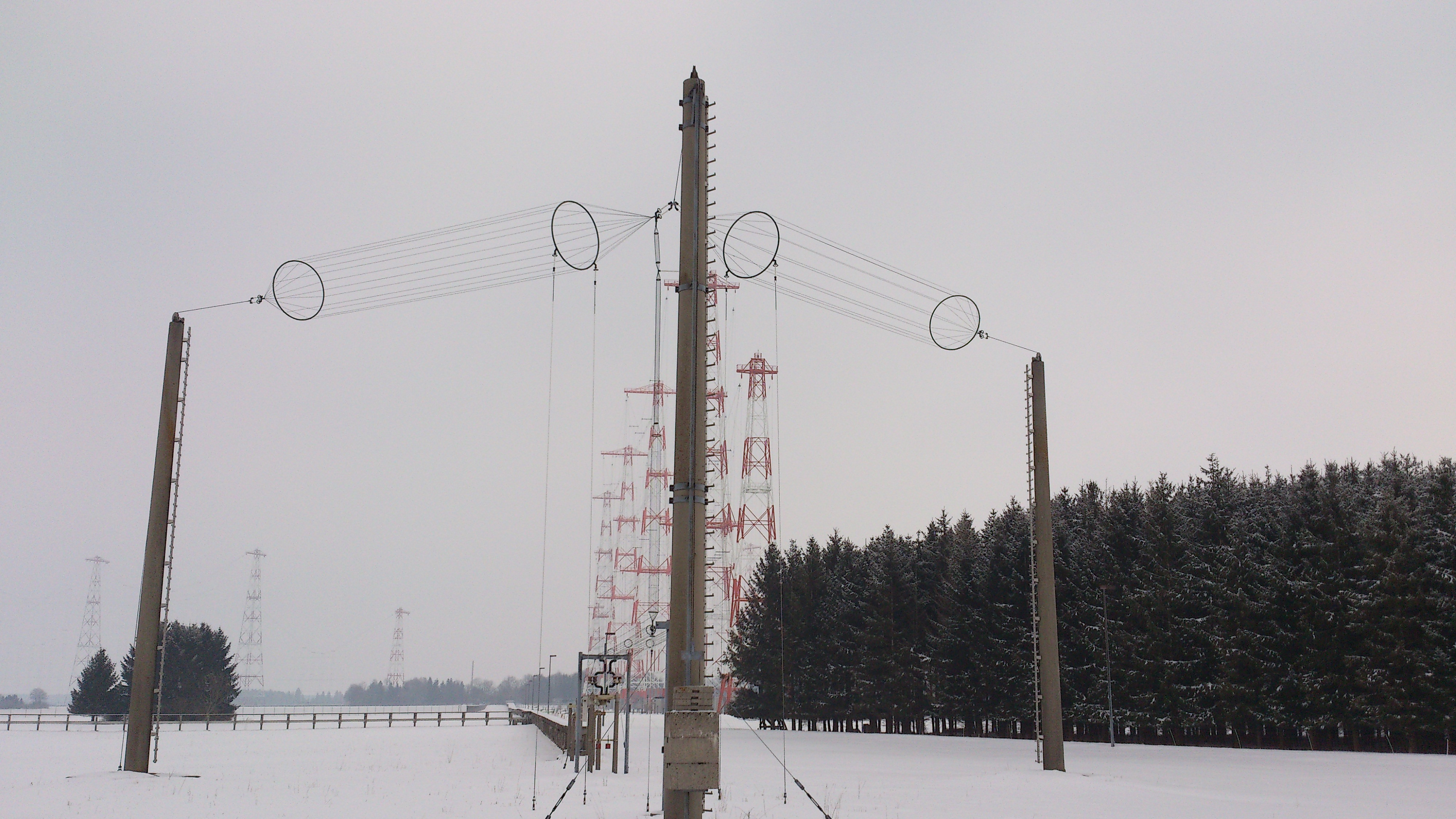
Shortwave quadrant antenna made of two horizontal cage sections.

Quadrant antenna
A quadrant antenna is an omnidirectional shortwave transmitting antenna shaped like a rhombus or lozenge, made from two identical, opposing L-shaped cage dipoles ("L⅂") lying in the same horizontal plane, aligned with their 'elbows' pointing in opposite directions ("‹›")

Curtain antenna
A curtain array antenna is a directional shortwave transmitting antenna made of several parallel-aligned dipoles, each made of cage sections.

== History ==
In 1921, an amateur radio operator tried to win a $500 prize with his cage aerial.

== See also ==
- (PDF) Design and Analysis of Cross Cage Dipole Antenna
