= Bolshakovo =

Bolshakovo Большако́во
- Rural locality
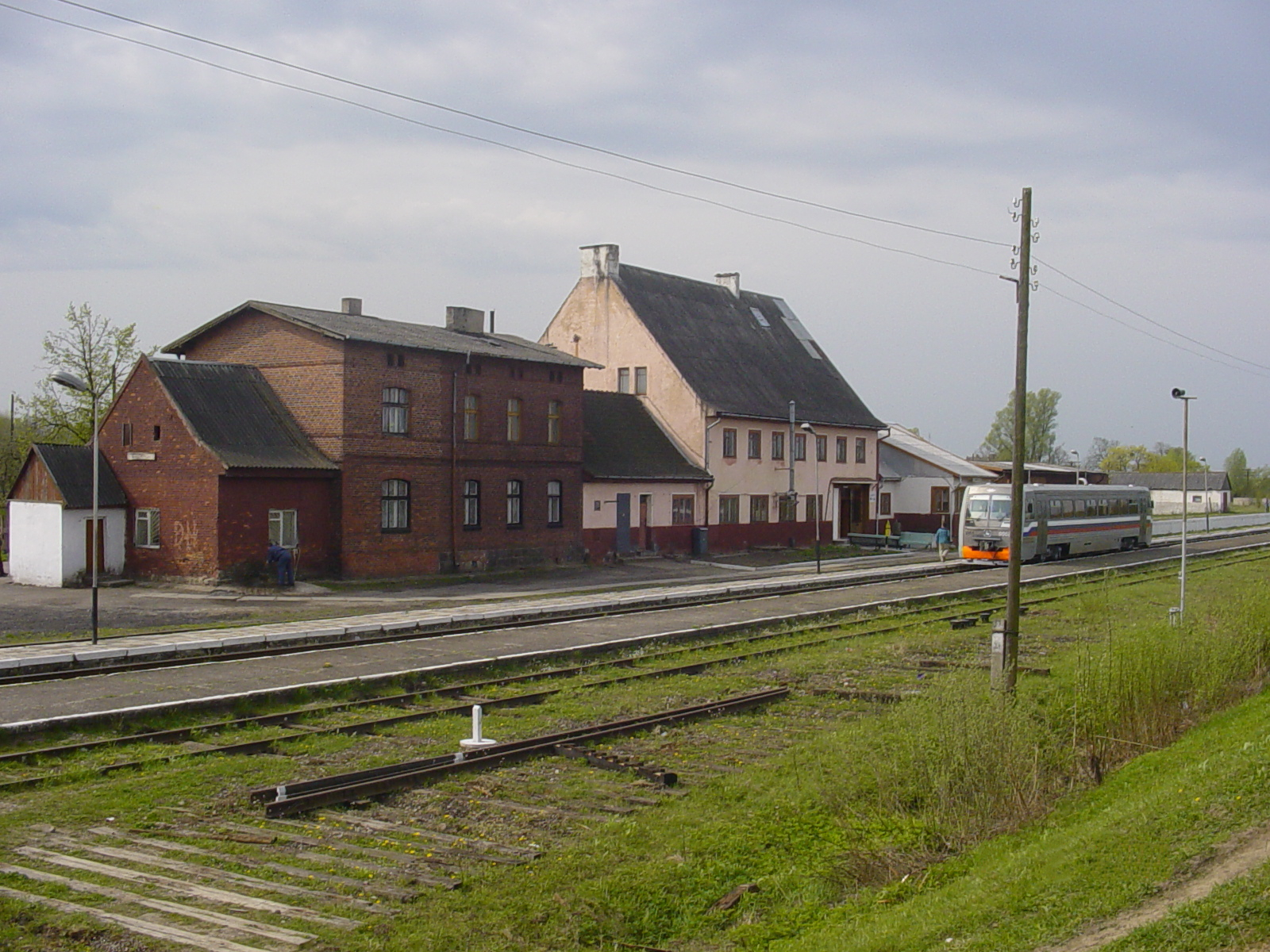
- Train station in Bolshakovo (Novoye)
- Interactive map of Bolshakovo
- Location of Bolshakovo Bolshakovo (European Russia) Bolshakovo (Russia)
- Coordinates: 54°52′49″N 21°39′11″E
- Country: Russia
- Federal subject: Kaliningrad Oblast
- Administrative district: Slavsky District
- Elevation: 17 m (56 ft)

Population (2010 Census)
  - Total: 2,448
  - Estimate (2010): 2,448 (0%)
- Time zone: UTC+2 (MSK–1)
- Postal code: 238620
- OKTMO ID: 27727000136

Bolshakovo (Russian: Большако́во, Lithuanian: Didieji Skaisgiriai, German: Groß Skaisgirren or Kreuzingen (1938-1946)), also referred to as Bolshakovo-Novoye (Russian: Большако́во-Новое), is a settlement located in the southern part of Slavsky District of Kaliningrad Oblast, Russia, 90 km from Kaliningrad. The adjective "Novoye" (new) is sometimes used to distinguish it from an eponymous village in Ivanovo Oblast of Russia.

It is situated on the road from Talpaki to Sovetsk. There are also roads from Bolshakovo to Polessk and to Chernyakhovsk. Bolshakovo is a railway station on the Kaliningrad–Sovetsk line.

Bolshakovo lies on the border of Polessk Lowland in a marsh landscape and has approximately 2,000 inhabitants.

Bolshakovo was a transmission site of the Voice of Russia broadcasting station, the Bolshakovo transmitter.

== History ==
The village was part of the state of the Teutonic Knights. In 1454, the region was incorporated by King Casimir IV Jagiellon to the Kingdom of Poland upon the request of the Prussian Confederation. After the subsequent Thirteen Years' War, since 1466, it formed part of Poland as a fief held by the Teutonic Order, and from 1525 held by Ducal Prussia. From the 18th century it was part of the Kingdom of Prussia, and from 1871 to 1945 it was also part of Germany, within which it was administratively located in the Landkreis Elchniederung (district) in the Province of East Prussia. In the late 19th century, the village had 147 houses and 731 inhabitants. The population was employed in agriculture and cattle and horse breeding. In 1938, during a massive Nazi campaign of renaming of placenames, it was renamed to Kreuzingen to erase traces of Lithuanian origin. Until the end of World War II, the biggest livestock railway station of Germany was located there. Following the war, it fell to the Soviet Union.
