= Vinnytsia TV Mast =

Ukrainian TV mast (built 1961)

Coordinates: 49°14′30.04″N 28°25′25.25″E

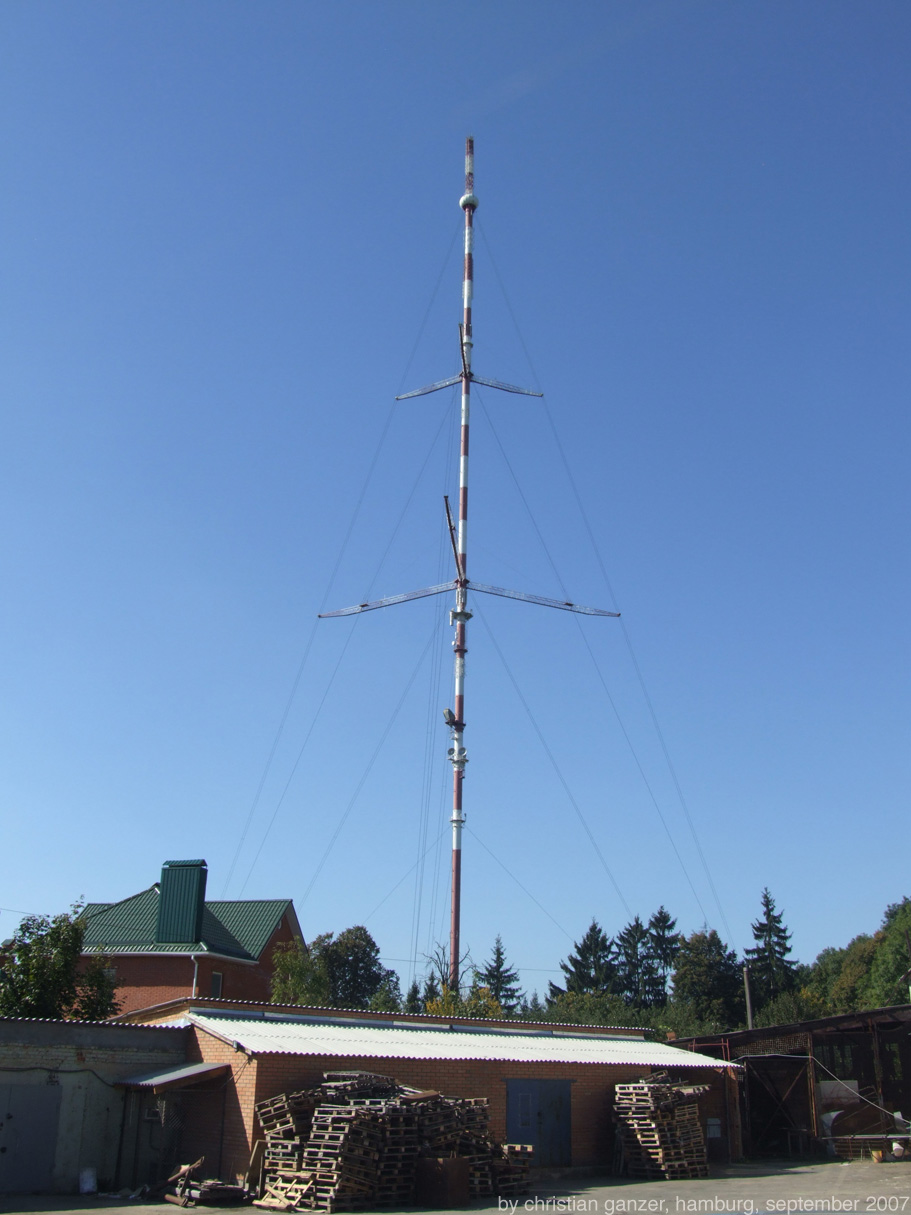
TV Tower Vinnytsia

The Vinnytsia TV Mast (Ukrainian: Вінницька телевежа, romanized: Vinnyts'ka televezha) is a 354-metre, 1161 ft high guyed steel tube mast, used for FM and TV transmission, in Vinnytsia, Ukraine. A special feature of its structure are three crossbars arranged in 120-degree angles in two levels, running from its structure to the guys. It was built in 1961.

Since height reduction of Belmont TV Mast it is the tallest guyed tubular steel mast in the world.

== 2022 airstrike ==
On March 16, 2022, as part of the Russian invasion of Ukraine, the tower was struck by Russian rocket fire, knocking out the city's broadcasting abilities. The tower suffered heavy damage as a result.

== See also ==
- List of masts
