= List of tallest structures in Central Asia =

This list ranks the tallest buildings and structures in Central Asia, including skyscrapers, towers, and other structures, based on official height.

The list includes structures located in the Central Asian countries of Kazakhstan, Kyrgyzstan, Tajikistan, Turkmenistan, and Uzbekistan.

== Tallest buildings ==
Was the tallest building in Central Asia upon completion

=== Skyscrapers ===
This list ranks buildings in Central Asia that stand at least 100 m (328 ft) tall, based on standard height measurement. This includes spires and architectural details, but does not include antenna masts. An equal sign (=) following a rank indicates the same height for two or more buildings. The "Year" column indicates the year in which a building was completed.

Rank	Name	Image	City	Country	Height m (ft)	Floors	Year	Notes	References
1	Abu Dhabi Plaza		Astana	Kazakhstan	310.8 m (1,020 ft)	75	2022	Tallest building in Kazakhstan and Central Asia. The first supertall skyscraper in Central Asia.	
2	Nest One		Tashkent	Uzbekistan	266.5 m (874 ft)	52+4	2023	Tallest building in Uzbekistan.	
3	Piramit Tower		Tashkent	Uzbekistan	203 m (666 ft)	52	2024	Second tallest building in Uzbekistan.	
4	Emerald Quarter Block B		Astana	Kazakhstan	201 m (659 ft)	49	2012	Tallest office building in Kazakhstan. Tallest building in Kazakhstan and Central Asia from 2012 to 2022.	
5	Kazakhstan Railways Building 2		Astana	Kazakhstan	174 m (571 ft)	40	2009	Tallest building in Kazakhstan and Central Asia from 2009 to 2011.	
6	Kazakhstan Railways Building 1		Astana	Kazakhstan	165 m (541 ft)	37	2009		
7	Esentai Tower		Almaty	Kazakhstan	162 m (531 ft)	36	2008	Tallest building in Almaty and the tallest building in Kazakhstan outside of Astana. Tallest building in Kazakhstan and Central Asia from 2008 to 2009.	
8	PSB Bank Financial Center		Tashkent	Uzbekistan	159 m (522 ft)	33	2023	Also known as SQB Financial Center. Tallest office building in Uzbekistan.	
9	Transport Tower		Astana	Kazakhstan	155 m (509 ft)	34	2003	Tallest building in Central Asia and Kazakhstan from 2003 to 2008. Severely damaged by fire on May 30, 2006.	
10	Grand Alatau 3		Astana	Kazakhstan	153 m (502 ft)	43	2009	Tallest residential building in Central Asia and Kazakhstan.	
11	Emerald Quarter Block A		Astana	Kazakhstan	151 m (495 ft)	37	2010		
12	Khan Shatyr Entertainment Center		Astana	Kazakhstan	150 m (492 ft)	5	2010	Tallest tent in the world. Designed by Norman Foster.	
13	Talan Tower 1		Astana	Kazakhstan	145.6 m (478 ft)	30	2017		
14	BoMI Business Center		Tashkent	Uzbekistan	143.9 m (472 ft)	30	2025	Also known as BoMI Finance Center.	
15	Triumph of Astana		Astana	Kazakhstan	142 m (466 ft)	39	2006	Tallest residential building in Kazakhstan from 2006 to 2009.	
16=	Northern Lights Residential Complex Block 5/1		Astana	Kazakhstan	140 m (459 ft)	42	2008		
16=	Aloqa Bank Financial Center		Tashkent	Uzbekistan	140 m (459 ft)	26	2023		
18	Asaka Bank Financial Center		Tashkent	Uzbekistan	136 m (446 ft)	26	2023		
19=	Grand Alatau 4		Astana	Kazakhstan	135 m (443 ft)	38	2009		
19=	HighVill Astana F1		Astana	Kazakhstan	135 m (443 ft)	31	2015		
19=	HighVill Astana F2		Astana	Kazakhstan	135 m (443 ft)	31	2015		
19=	HighVill Astana F3		Astana	Kazakhstan	135 m (443 ft)	31	2015		
19=	Abu Dhabi Plaza Offices A		Astana	Kazakhstan	135 m (443 ft)	31	2019		
24=	Nurly Tau 1		Almaty	Kazakhstan	132.5 m (435 ft)	34	2008		
24=	Nurly Tau 2		Almaty	Kazakhstan	132.5 m (435 ft)	34	2008		
26=	Elite Apart-Hotel		Astana	Kazakhstan	130 m (427 ft)	30	2016		
26=	Abu Dhabi Plaza Offices B		Astana	Kazakhstan	130 m (427 ft)	29	2019		
29	Orion Residence		Almaty	Kazakhstan	128.6 m (422 ft)	30	2017	Tallest residential building in Almaty.	
30	Tashkent City Mall Office Tower		Tashkent	Uzbekistan	128 m (420 ft)	28	2023		
31	ORION III		Almaty	Kazakhstan	126 m (413 ft)	33	2025		
32	Northern Lights Residential Complex Block 5		Astana	Kazakhstan	125 m (410 ft)	37	2008		
33	Talan Tower 2		Astana	Kazakhstan	124 m (407 ft)	26	2017		
34	Tajiktelecom Communications Office		Dushanbe	Tajikistan	123 m (404 ft)	30	2021	Tallest building in Tajikistan. The first skyscraper in Tajikistan.	
35	Beijing Palace Soluxe Hotel Astana		Astana	Kazakhstan	121.7 m (399 ft)	25	2008	Tallest hotel in Kazakhstan.	
36	Tashkent City Mall Hotel Tower		Tashkent	Uzbekistan	119 m (390 ft)	26	2023	Tallest hotel in Uzbekistan.	
37	Tashkent City Mall Residential Tower		Tashkent	Uzbekistan	117 m (384 ft)	26	2023	Tallest residential building in Uzbekistan.	
38	Capital Residential Complex		Astana	Kazakhstan	115 m (377 ft)	29	2008		
39	Green Quarter Administrative Building 17/10		Astana	Kazakhstan	113 m (371 ft)	26	2018		
40=	Northern Lights Residential Complex Block 5/2		Astana	Kazakhstan	110 m (361 ft)	32	2010		
40=	International Oil and Gas University		Ashgabat	Turkmenistan	110 m (361 ft)	18	2012		
40=	Nest One Ritz Carlton Hotel		Tashkent	Uzbekistan	110 m (361 ft)	28	2023		
40=	Nest One Office Tower		Tashkent	Uzbekistan	110 m (361 ft)	28	2023		
40=	U Tower		Tashkent	Uzbekistan	110 m (361 ft)	30	2024		
45	National Bank of Uzbekistan		Tashkent	Uzbekistan	108 m (354 ft)	26	1997	Tallest building in Central Asia from 1997 to 2003. Tallest building in Uzbekistan from 1997 to 2023.	
46	Yyldyz Hotel		Ashgabat	Turkmenistan	106.7 m (350 ft)	24	2013	Tallest hotel in Turkmenistan.	
47=	Business Center 7th Continent		Astana	Kazakhstan	105 m (344 ft)	22	2006		
47=	Watergreen Boulevard Complex		Astana	Kazakhstan	105 m (344 ft)	28	2010		
49=	State Concern Turkmengas		Ashgabat	Turkmenistan	103 m (338 ft)	23	2003		
49=	Ministry of Trade and Exchange		Ashgabat	Turkmenistan	103 m (338 ft)	24	2007		
51=	Hotel Kazakhstan		Almaty	Kazakhstan	102 m (335 ft)	26	1974	Tallest hotel in Almaty. Tallest building in Central Asia from 1974 to 1997. The first skyscraper in Kazakhstan.	
51=	Kazyna Tower 1		Astana	Kazakhstan	102 m (335 ft)	21	2007		
51=	Kazyna Tower 2		Astana	Kazakhstan	102 m (335 ft)	21	2007		
51=	Moskva Park		Astana	Kazakhstan	102 m (335 ft)	25	2010		
51=	Astana Media Center		Astana	Kazakhstan	102 m (335 ft)	24	2012		
56=	Mazhilis Building		Astana	Kazakhstan	100 m (328 ft)	22	2004		
56=	Government House		Astana	Kazakhstan	100 m (328 ft)	21	2005		
56=	Almaty Towers 1		Almaty	Kazakhstan	100 m (328 ft)	25	2008	Formerly known as Rakhat Towers 1. The building was renamed in 2009 due to two criminal cases initiated against Rakhat Aliyev under the Criminal Code of the Republic of Kazakhstan.	
56=	Almaty Towers 2		Almaty	Kazakhstan	100 m (328 ft)	25	2008	Formerly known as Rakhat Towers 2. The building was renamed in 2009 due to two criminal cases initiated against Rakhat Aliyev under the Criminal Code of the Republic of Kazakhstan.	
56=	Astana Saad Hotel		Astana	Kazakhstan	100 m (330 ft)	28	2014		

== Buildings under construction ==
Name	City	Country	Height m (ft)	Floors	Estimated Completion	Notes	References
Dushanbe Tower	Dushanbe	Tajikistan	340 m (1,115 ft)	77	2031	Set to become the tallest building in Central Asia.	
Iconic Towers 1	Alatau City	Kazakhstan	272 m (892 ft)	56	2029	Construction is scheduled to begin in May 2026.	
Manas Tower 45	Bishkek	Kyrgyzstan	213 m (699 ft)	45	2027	Will become the tallest building and the first skyscraper in Kyrgyzstan.	
RAMS Beyond Almaty	Almaty	Kazakhstan	—	40	—	Will become the tallest building in Kazakhstan outside of Astana. Currently on hold since 2025 due to regulatory violations and illegal construction issues.	
Hills Blue	Tashkent	Uzbekistan	180 m (591 ft)	44	2028	Will become the third-tallest building in Uzbekistan.	
Ritz-Carlton Hotel	Tashkent	Uzbekistan	136 m (446 ft)	30	2028	Will become the tallest hotel in Uzbekistan.	
Ak-Zhayik Hotel	Atyrau	Kazakhstan	130 m (430 ft)	32	2030	On November 16, 2025, the dismantling of the rear extension of the old hotel building began.	
Labzak Park City	Tashkent	Uzbekistan	122 m (400 ft)	32	2027		
Nexpo Global Block 7	Astana	Kazakhstan	–	30	2028		
Nexpo Global Block 8	Astana	Kazakhstan	–	30	2028		
Shymkent Tower	Shymkent	Kazakhstan	118 m (387 ft)	26	—	Currently on hold since 2022.	
Diamond Multifunctional Centre	Astana	Kazakhstan	109 m (358 ft)	25	—		

== Buildings proposed ==
Name	City	Country	Height m (ft)	Floors	Estimated Completion	Notes	References
Tashkent Twin City Towers 1	Tashkent	Uzbekistan	575 m (1,886 ft)	119	2045	Designed by Cross Works. Would be the tallest building in Central Asia and rank as the sixth-tallest building in the world surpassing Lotte World Tower in South Korea.	
Tengri Tower	Astana	Kazakhstan	—	100	—	Would be the tallest building in Kazakhstan.	
Tashkent Twin City Towers 2	Tashkent	Uzbekistan	395 m (1,296 ft)	81	2045		
Astana World Trade Center	Astana	Kazakhstan	350 m (1,148 ft)	91	—		
Day and Night Twin Towers	Tashkent	Uzbekistan	230 m (755 ft)	50	—	Designed by Iki Design Group. The complex consists of two towers featuring rotating spheres symbolizing the sun and the moon.	
Untitled Ashgabat Skyscraper	Ashgabat	Turkmenistan	220 m (722 ft)	—	—		
Tashkent City Zone 4 Tower	Tashkent	Uzbekistan	200 m (656 ft)	40	—		
Astana Tower (Moshe Zur Architects and Town Planners)	Astana	Kazakhstan	192 m (630 ft)	47	—		
Paragon	Tashkent	Uzbekistan	156 m (512 ft)	26	—		
M Tower	Tashkent	Uzbekistan	136 m (446 ft)	27	—	Would become the tallest residential building in Uzbekistan.	
Tower of the Sun	Astana	Kazakhstan	121 m (397 ft)	31	—	Designed by Fundamental Architects and Omega Render. Its design is inspired by the flag of Kazakhstan and incorporates a large circular opening within the structure.	

== Tallest structures ==
This list ranks structures and non-habitable buildings in Central Asia that stand at least 100 m (328 ft) tall, based on standard height measurements. The height includes spires, architectural details, and antenna masts.

Rank	Name	Image	City	Country	Height m (ft)	Year	Structure Type	Notes	References
1	Ekibastuz GRES-2 Power Station		Ekibastuz	Kazakhstan	419.7 m (1,377 ft)	1987	Chimney	Tallest flue gas stack in the world.	
2	Tashkent Tower		Tashkent	Uzbekistan	374.9 m (1,230 ft)	1985	Tower	Tallest observation tower in Central Asia.	
3	Almaty Tower		Almaty	Kazakhstan	371.5 m (1,219 ft)	1983	Tower	Tallest observation tower in Central Asia from 1983 to 1985.	
4=	Syrdarya Power Plant		Syrdarya	Uzbekistan	350 m (1,148 ft)	1972	Chimney		
4=	Uchkizil TV Mast		Termiz	Uzbekistan	350 m (1,148 ft)	1990	Guyed Mast	Tallest guyed mast in Central Asia jointly along with Novaja TV Mast.	
4=	Novaja TV Mast		Karaganda	Kazakhstan	350 m (1,148 ft)	2001	Guyed Mast		
5=	Ekibastuz GRES-1		Ekibastuz	Kazakhstan	330 m (1,083 ft)	1982	Chimney		
5=	Novo-Angrenskaya Power Plant		Olmaliq	Uzbekistan	330 m (1,083 ft)	1985	Chimney		
6	Turkmenistan TV Tower		Ashgabat	Turkmenistan	211 m (692 ft)	2011	Tower	Tallest structure in Turkmenistan; holds the Guinness World Record for the largest architectural star.	
7	Dushanbe TV Tower		Dushanbe	Tajikistan	197 m (646 ft)	1959	Tower	4-sided, 3803 KM design	
8	Karaganda TV Tower		Karaganda	Kazakhstan	192 m (630 ft)	1957	Tower	4-sided, 3803 KM design	
9	Bishkek TV Tower		Bishkek	Kyrgyzstan	193 m (633 ft)	1958	Tower	4-sided, 3803 KM design	
10	Almaty Old TV Tower		Almaty	Kazakhstan	192 m (630 ft)	1957	Tower	4-sided, 3803 KM design	
11	Pavlodar TV tower		Pavlodar	Kazakhstan	192 m (630 ft)	1965	Tower	4-sided, 3803 KM design	
12	Tashkent Old TV Tower		Tashkent	Uzbekistan	186 m (610 ft)	1956	Tower	4-sided, 3803 KM design	
13	Monument to the Constitution		Ashgabat	Turkmenistan	185 m (607 ft)	2011	Monument		
14	Dushanbe Flagpole		Dushanbe	Tajikistan	165 m (541 ft)	2011	Flagpole	Tallest flagpole in Central Asia.	
15	Independence Monument		Ashgabat	Turkmenistan	118 m (387 ft)	2001	Monument		
16	Baiterek		Astana	Kazakhstan	105 m (344 ft)	2002	Tower		

== See also ==
- List of tallest buildings in Kazakhstan
  - List of tallest buildings in Astana
- List of tallest buildings in Uzbekistan
- List of tallest structures in Uzbekistan
- List of tallest structures in Turkmenistan
- List of tallest structures in the former Soviet Union
- List of tallest buildings in Asia
