= List of tallest buildings in Kazakhstan =

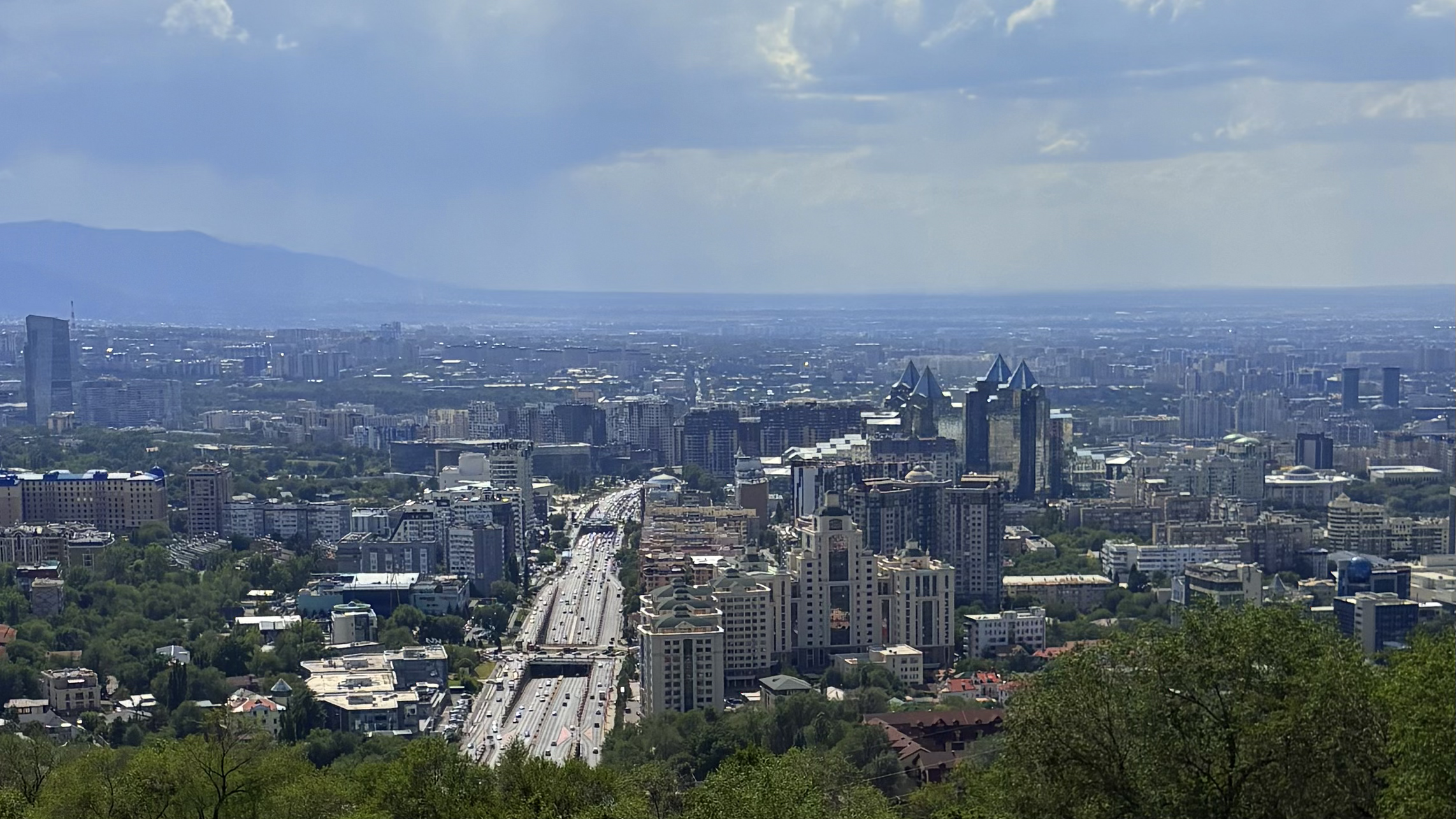
The skyline of Almaty in 2025

This list ranks the tallest buildings in Kazakhstan by height.

== Tallest buildings ==
Was the tallest building in Kazakhstan upon completion

This list ranks completed buildings in Kazakhstan that stand at least 100 m (330 ft) tall, based on standard height measurements. The height includes spires and architectural details but excludes antenna masts. An equal sign (=) following a rank indicates the same height for two or more buildings. The “Year” column indicates the year in which each building was completed.

Rank	Name	Image	City	Height m (ft)	Floors	Year	Notes	References
1	Abu Dhabi Plaza		Astana	310.8 m (1,020 ft)	75	2022	Tallest building in Kazakhstan and Central Asia since 2022. Tallest building in Post-Soviet states outside of Russia.	
2	Emerald Quarter Block B		Astana	201 m (659 ft)	49	2012	Tallest office building in Kazakhstan. Tallest building in Kazakhstan from 2012 to 2022.	
3	Kazakhstan Railways HQ-2		Astana	174 m (571 ft)	40	2009	Tallest building in Kazakhstan from 2009 to 2012.	
4	Kazakhstan Railways HQ-1		Astana	165 m (541 ft)	37	2009		
5	Esentai Tower		Almaty	162 m (531 ft)	36	2008	Tallest building in Almaty and the tallest building in Kazakhstan outside of Astana. Tallest building in Kazakhstan from 2008 to 2009. Tallest building in southern Kazakhstan.	
6	Transport Tower		Astana	155 m (509 ft)	34	2003	Also known as Ministry of Transportation & Communication. Tallest building in Kazakhstan from 2003 to 2008.	
7	Grand Alatau 3		Astana	153 m (502 ft)	43	2009	Tallest residential building in Kazakhstan since 2009. Widely misreported as 144 m (472 ft).	
8	Emerald Tower (Emerald Quarter Block A)		Astana	151 m (495 ft)	37	2010		
9	Talan Tower 1		Astana	145.6 m (478 ft)	30	2017		
10	Triumph of Astana		Astana	142 m (466 ft)	39	2006	Tallest residential building in Kazakhstan from 2006 to 2009.	
11	Northern Lights Residential Complex Block 5/1		Astana	140 m (460 ft)	41	2008	Widely misreported as 180 m (590 ft).	
12=	HighVill Astana F1		Astana	135 m (443 ft)	31	2015		
12=	HighVill Astana F2		Astana	135 m (443 ft)	31	2015		
12=	HighVill Astana F3		Astana	135 m (443 ft)	31	2015		
12=	Abu Dhabi Plaza Offices A		Astana	135 m (443 ft)	31	2019		
16=	Nurly Tau 1		Almaty	132.5 m (435 ft)	34	2008		
16=	Nurly Tau 2		Almaty	132.5 m (435 ft)	34	2008		
18=	Grand Alatau 4		Astana	130 m (430 ft)	38	2009		
18=	Abu Dhabi Plaza Offices B		Astana	130 m (430 ft)	29	2019		
18=	Elite Apart-Hotel		Astana	130 m (430 ft)	30	2016		
21	Orion Residence		Almaty	128.6 m (422 ft)	30	2017	Tallest residential building in Almaty.	
22	ORION III		Almaty	126 m (413 ft)	33	2025		
23	Northern Lights Residential Complex Block 5		Astana	125 m (410 ft)	37	2008	Widely misreported as 152 m (499 ft).	
24	Beijing Palace Soluxe Hotel Astana		Astana	120.7 m (396 ft)	25	2008		
25	Talan Tower 2		Astana	119.8 m (393 ft)	26	2017		
26	Capital Residential Complex		Astana	115 m (377 ft)	29	2008		
27	Green Quarter Administrative Building 1		Astana	113 m (371 ft)	26	2018		
28	Northern Lights Residential Complex Block 5/2		Astana	110 m (360 ft)	33	2010	Widely misreported as 128 m (420 ft).	
29=	Watergreen Boulevard Complex		Astana	105 m (344 ft)	28	2010		
29=	Grand Astana Block F1		Astana	105 m (344 ft)	30	2011		
29=	7th Continent		Astana	105 m (344 ft)	22	2006		
29=	Astana Media Center		Astana	105 m (344 ft)	24	2012		
30=	HighVill Ishim D2		Astana	103 m (338 ft)	30	2018		
30=	HighVill Ishim D1		Astana	103 m (338 ft)	29	2018		
30=	Moskva Business Center		Astana	103 m (338 ft)	25	2010		
30=	Kazyna Tower I		Astana	103 m (338 ft)	21	2007		
30=	Kazyna Tower II		Astana	103 m (338 ft)	21	2007		
35	Hotel Kazakhstan		Almaty	102 m (335 ft)	26	1974	Tallest building in Kazakhstan from 1974 to 2003 and the first skyscraper in Kazakhstan.	
36=	Almaty Towers 1		Astana	100 m (330 ft)	25	2008	The buildings' previous name was "Rakhat Towers". The buildings was renamed in 2009 due to two criminal cases initiated against Rakhat Aliyev under the Criminal Code of the Republic of Kazakhstan.	
36=	Almaty Towers 2		Astana	100 m (330 ft)	25	2008	The buildings' previous name was "Rakhat Towers". The buildings was renamed in 2009 due to two criminal cases initiated against Rakhat Aliyev under the Criminal Code of the Republic of Kazakhstan.	
36=	Mazhilis Building		Astana	100 m (330 ft)	22	2004		
36=	Government House		Astana	100 m (330 ft)	21	2005		
36=	Astana Saad Hotel		Astana	100 m (330 ft)	28	2014		

== Under construction ==
Rank	Name	Image	City	Height m (ft)	Floors	Estimated Completion	Notes	References
1	Iconic Towers 1		Alatau	272 m (892 ft)	56	2029	Iconic Towers is a planned landmark mixed-use skyscraper complex designed as the anchor project of the new Alatau City development in Kazakhstan.	
2	RAMS Beyond Almaty		Almaty	–	40	–	Upon completion, it will become the tallest building in Kazakhstan outside of Astana. Construction has been on hold since 2025 due to regulatory violations and illegal construction issues.	
3	Ak-Zhayik Hotel		Atyrau	130 m (430 ft)	32	2030	On November 16, 2025, the dismantling of the rear extension of the old hotel building began.	
4=	Nexpo Global Block 7		Astana	–	30	2028		
4=	Nexpo Global Block 8		Astana	–	30	2028		
5	Shymkent Tower		Shymkent	118.4 m (388 ft)	26	–	Currently on hold since 2022.	
6	Diamond Multifunctional Centre		Astana	109 m (358 ft)	25	–		

== Proposed ==
Rank	Name	Image	City	Height m (ft)	Floors	Estimated Completion	Notes	References
1=	Shymkent City Mall 1		Shymkent	–	35	–	Currently on hold since 2023.	
1=	Shymkent City Mall 2		Shymkent	–	35	–	Currently on hold since 2023.	
1=	Shymkent City Mall 3		Shymkent	–	35	–	Currently on hold since 2023.	
1=	Shymkent City Mall 4		Shymkent	–	35	–	Currently on hold since 2023.	
1=	Shymkent City Mall 5		Shymkent	–	35	–	Currently on hold since 2023.	

== Timeline of tallest buildings in Kazakhstan ==
Name	City	Height (m)	Height (ft)	Floors	Years As Tallest
Hotel Kazakhstan	Almaty	102	335	26	1974–2003
Transport Tower	Astana	155	509	34	2003–2008
Esentai Tower	Almaty	162	531	38	2008-2009
Kazakhstan Railways HQ-2	Astana	174	571	40	2009–2012
Emerald Quarter Block B	Astana	201	659	49	2012–2022
Abu Dhabi Plaza	Astana	311	1,020	75	2022–Present

== Unbuilt ==
Rank	Name	Image	City	Height m (ft)	Floors	Notes	References
1	Tengri Tower		Astana	–	100	The project was designed by INK Architects as a 100-story building. It was later cancelled due to difficulties in acquiring the project site and a lack of funding. If built, it would have become the first 100-story building in Central Asia.	
2	Abu Dhabi Plaza (Central Markets Proposal)		Astana	382 m (1,253 ft)	88	Downsized to 311 meters with 75 floors.	
3	World Trade Center		Astana	350 m (1,150 ft)	–	Cancelled due to financial difficulties arising from the COVID-19 pandemic. The construction site was subsequently sold to BI Group.	
4	Energy Tower		Aktau	340 m (1,120 ft)	77	Cancelled, along with the entire Aktau City project, in 2013. The tower was planned as the tallest building in the Aktau City project.	
5	Balbaltas Residential Complex		Astana	290 m (950 ft)	60	Now built as Kazmedia Center.	
6	Ritz-Carlton Hotel Astana		Astana	242 m (794 ft)	60	Now built as Talan Towers.	
7	The Seven Towers 1		Astana	230 m (750 ft)	60	Cancelled	
8	Business Center (Kabanbay Batyr Avenue)		Astana	–	60	Cancelled	
9=	Shymkent-Tower		Shymkent	–	57	Cancelled. Complex of twin towers was presented by "Shanghai Construction" as a plan for original "Shymkent City" project proposal during the meeting of Akim of South Kazakhstan region Zh.Tuimebayev with the Chinese delegation in June 2017.	
9=	Shanghai-Tower		Shymkent	–	57	Cancelled. Complex of twin towers was presented by "Shanghai Construction" as a plan for original "Shymkent City" project proposal during the meeting of Akim of South Kazakhstan region Zh.Tuimebayev with the Chinese delegation in June 2017.	
11=	AFD Tower 1		Almaty	216 m (709 ft)	42	Cancelled due to height limitations above the Al-Farabi district in Almaty.	
11=	AFD Tower 2		Almaty	216 m (709 ft)	42	Cancelled due to height limitations above the Al-Farabi district in Almaty.	
13	The Republic		Astana	215 m (705 ft)	49	Cancelled	
14	Emerald Quarter Block A		Astana	210 m (690 ft)	53	The tower was planned as the first building in the Emerald Towers Complex but was downsized to 201 meters and moved to Block B due to the Great Recession of 2008.	
15	Astana Tower		Astana	192 m (630 ft)	47	Cancelled	
16	Tulpar Hotel		Astana	180 m (590 ft)	–	Cancelled	
17	Emerald Quarter Block C		Astana	170 m (560 ft)	43	The tower was planned as the third building in the Emerald Towers Complex but was cancelled due to the Great Recession of 2008.	
18	Woorim Appletown Tower 1		Almaty	–	45	The project was scaled back, and the towers were ultimately cancelled.	
19	Woorim Appletown Tower 2		Almaty	–	45	The project was scaled back, and the towers were ultimately cancelled.	
20	Dostyk Office Complex		Almaty	–	42	Now built as Dostyk Plaza Mall.	
21	Almaty Park		Almaty	–	38	Replaced by RAMS Beyond Almaty.	
22	Baydibek Tower		Shymkent		38	Cancelled due to Capital Group's faced financial problems with housing sales in Shymkent.	
23	TuranAlem Bank		Almaty	–	37	Cancelled	
24	World Trade Center 2		Astana	150 m (490 ft)	–	Cancelled due to financial difficulties arising from the COVID-19 pandemic. The construction site was subsequently sold to BI Group.	
25	Ken Dala Residential		Astana	–	34	Cancelled	
26	Samal Prestige		Almaty	–	34	Cancelled	
27	Tower of the Sun		Astana	121 m (397 ft)	31	Cancelled due to multiple complaints from nearby residents. The building was designed by Fundamental Architects and Omega Render, and its form was inspired by the flag of Kazakhstan, featuring a large circular opening in its structure.	
28=	Grand Astana Block F2		Astana	105 m (344 ft)	30	The "KUAT" construction company went bankrupt, which led to further project downsizing by "KazStroyPodryad," which completed the construction.	
28=	Grand Astana Block F3		Astana	105 m (344 ft)	30	The "KUAT" construction company went bankrupt, which led to further project downsizing by "KazStroyPodryad," which completed the construction.	
28=	Grand Astana Block F4		Astana	105 m (344 ft)	30	The "KUAT" construction company went bankrupt, which led to further project downsizing by "KazStroyPodryad," which completed the construction.	
28=	Grand Astana Block F5		Astana	105 m (344 ft)	30	The "KUAT" construction company went bankrupt, which led to further project downsizing by "KazStroyPodryad," which completed the construction.	
32=	Grand Astana Block C1		Astana	100 m (330 ft)	30	The "KUAT" construction company went bankrupt, which led to further project downsizing by "KazStroyPodryad," which completed the construction.	
32=	Grand Astana Block C2		Astana	100 m (330 ft)	30	The "KUAT" construction company went bankrupt, which led to further project downsizing by "KazStroyPodryad," which completed the construction.	
32=	Grand Astana Block C3		Astana	100 m (330 ft)	30	The "KUAT" construction company went bankrupt, which led to further project downsizing by "KazStroyPodryad," which completed the construction.	

== See also ==
- List of tallest buildings in Astana
- List of tallest structures in Central Asia
- List of tallest buildings in Asia
