= List of tallest structures in Uzbekistan =

This list of tallest structures in Uzbekistan ranks skyscrapers, towers and other structures in Uzbekistan based on official height.

== Completed tallest structures ==
This list ranks the tallest buildings and structures in Uzbekistan that stand at least 100 m (330 ft) or 20 floors tall. Only completed structures and buildings that have been topped out are included.

Name	Image	City	Country	Height (m)	Height (ft)	Floors	Completion	Building type	Notes	Ref.
Tashkent Tower		Tashkent	Uzbekistan	375	1230		1985	Tower		
Chimney of Units 5-10 of Syrdarya Power Plant		Syrdarya	Uzbekistan	350	1148		1975	Chimney		
Uchkizil TV Mast		Termiz	Uzbekistan	350	1148		1990	Mast (wired)		
Chimney of Novo-Angrenskaya Power Plant		Olmaliq	Uzbekistan	330	1083		1985	Chimney		
Chimney of Talimarjan Power Plant		Nuriston	Uzbekistan	273	893		1994	Chimney		
Nest One Main Tower		Tashkent	Uzbekistan	266.5	874.3	51	2023	Skyscraper	Real estate, business centers, markets, restaurants, SPA and fitness centres.	
Piramit Tower		Tashkent	Uzbekistan	185	606	47	2024	Skyscraper		
SQB Financial Center		Tashkent	Uzbekistan	156.3	511	33	2023	Skyscraper		
Asaka Bank Financial Center		Tashkent	Uzbekistan	142.9	465	30	2023	Skyscraper		
Aloqa Bank Financial Center		Tashkent	Uzbekistan	135	442	27	2023	Skyscraper		
Bomi Business Center		Tashkent	Uzbekistan	131	424	27	2024	Skyscraper		
Tashkent City Mall Fairmont Hotel		Tashkent	Uzbekistan	130	426	31	2024	Skyscraper		
Tashkent City Mall Fairmont Residences		Tashkent	Uzbekistan	130	426	29	2024	Skyscraper		
Tashkent City Mall Office Tower		Tashkent	Uzbekistan	130	426	30	2024	Skyscraper		
Hyper Partners Office Tower		Tashkent	Uzbekistan	128	419	28	2023	Skyscraper		
Hyper Partners Hotel Tower		Tashkent	Uzbekistan	119	390	26	2023	Skyscraper		
Hyper Partners Residential Tower		Tashkent	Uzbekistan	117	383	26	2023	Skyscraper		
Nest One Smart		Tashkent	Uzbekistan	110	360	28	2023	Skyscraper		
Nest One Office		Tashkent	Uzbekistan	110	360	28	2023	Skyscraper		
U Tower		Tashkent	Uzbekistan	110	360	26	2023	Skyscraper		
NBU		Tashkent	Uzbekistan	108	354	23	1997	Skyscraper		

== See also ==
- List of tallest buildings in Uzbekistan
- List of tallest structures in Central Asia
- List of tallest structures in Turkmenistan
- List of tallest structures in the former Soviet Union
- List of tallest buildings in Asia
