= Esentai Tower =

High-rise building in Almaty, Kazakhstan

- Kazakh: Есентай мұнарасы, Esentay munarası Russian: Есентайская башня
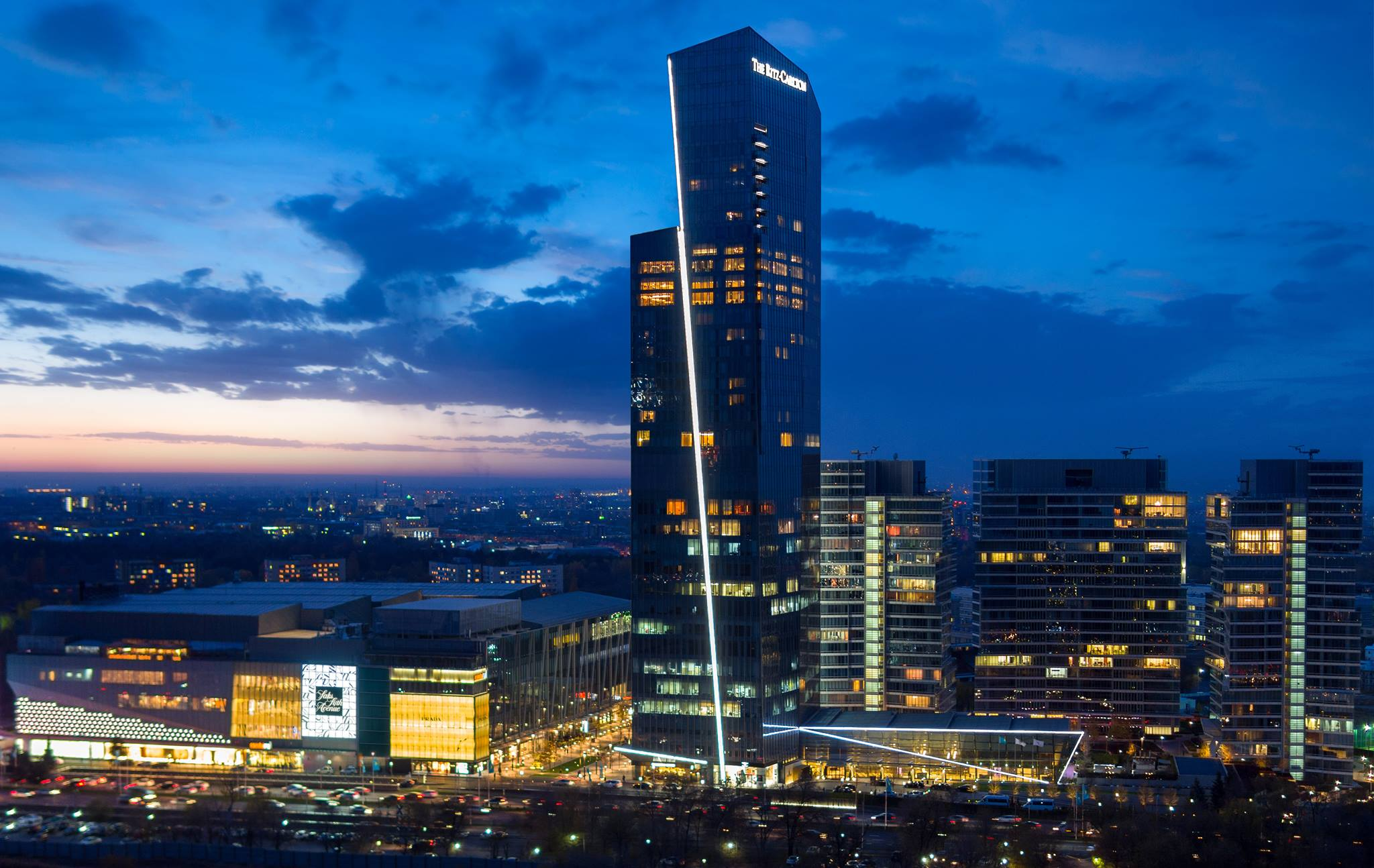
- Interactive map of the Esentai Tower area

General information
- Status: Completed
- Type: Office, Hotel
- Architectural style: Postmodern
- Location: Almaty, Kazakhstan, Al-Farabi Avenue 77/7, Almaty
- Coordinates: 43.21905°N 76.92937°E
- Construction started: 2006
- Completed: 2008
- Owner: The Ritz-Carlton Hotel Company; JW Marriott Hotels (former); Qairat Boranbaev (former)

Height
- Roof: 162 m (531 ft)

Technical details
- Structural system: Concrete
- Floor count: 36
- Floor area: 27,000 m^{2} (291,000 sq ft)

Design and construction
- Architect: Skidmore, Owings & Merrill
- Developer: Capital Partners
- Structural engineer: Leslie E. Robertson Associates

The Esentai Tower (Kazakh: Есентай мұнарасы, romanized: Esentay munarası, Russian: Есентайская башня) also known as the Almaty JW Marriott Hotel is a high-rise mixed-use building in the Medeu District of Almaty, Kazakhstan. Built between 2006 and 2008, the tower stands at 162 m (531 ft) tall with 36 floors and is the current 5th tallest building in Kazakhstan. It was designed by Skidmore, Owings & Merrill (SOM) and it is part of the Esentai Complex.

== History ==
=== Architecture ===
The building is part of the Esentai Complex, a 368,000-square-metre (3,960,000 sq ft) mixed-use development built along the Esentai River in Almaty, Kazakhstan. The building disposes of a total of 27,000 square metres (290,000 sq ft) of Class A office space between ground level and the fourteenth level included. The building also houses offices for Ernst & Young, HSBC, Credit Suisse, and Renaissance Capital.

The first fourteen floors of the tower are occupied by offices, conference rooms, recreation areas and extensive shopping gallery with restaurants, with the 175-room Ritz-Carlton Hotel located above them, and the top eight floors of the building include serviced apartments. The American firm Leslie E. Robertson Associates (LERA) provided the structural design for the building who conceptualized a high-rise solution for seismic areas. The tower has a status of old-built greenframe building. It received the LEED Silver certification in June 2016.

== See also ==
- List of tallest buildings in Kazakhstan
- List of tallest structures in Central Asia

== Gallery ==
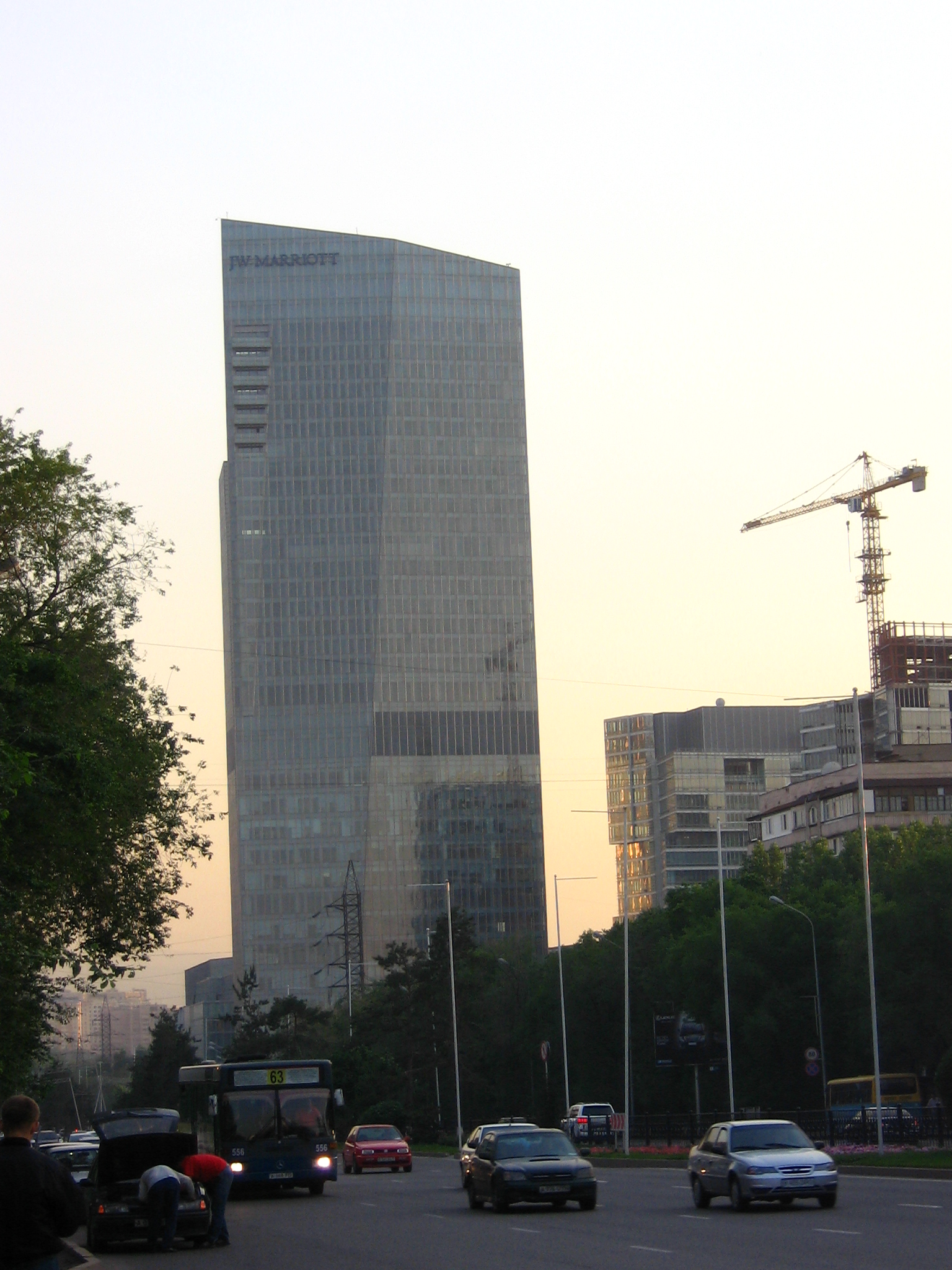
The tower in May 2012 while owned by Marriott
