= Ivan Mandzhikov =

Soviet serial killer and rapist (1965–1993)

- Born: Ivan Dmitrievich Mandzhikov; 1965; Almaty, Kazakh SSR
- Died: 1993 (aged 27–28); Almaty Detention Center No. 1, Almaty, Kazakhstan
- Cause of death: Execution by shooting
- Other names: "The Kazgugrad Monster" "The Bloody Monster" "The Full Moon Killer"
- Conviction: Murder
- Penalty: Death

Details
- Victims: 5
- Span of crimes: 1988–1989
- Country: Soviet Union
- State: Almaty
- Date apprehended: 1989

Ivan Dmitrievich Mandzhikov (Note: Named 'Sergey' in media sources) (Russian: Иван Дмитриевич Манджиков; 1965–1993), known as The Kazgugrad Monster (Russian: Казгуградский монстр), was a Soviet serial killer and rapist. Active between 1988 and 1989, he raped and killed students near the KazGU University, dismembering some of the victims' legs post-mortem. The investigation into his crimes was one of the largest-scaled ones in the history of the Kazakh SSR, and following his capture, Madzhikov was quickly sentenced to death and executed.

== Murders ==
=== Initial killings ===
The first girl to fall victim to Mandzhikov was Aizhan Zhumabaeva, (Note: Named 'Aliya' in media sources) a student in her early 20s from the university's Faculty of History, who disappeared in October 1988. She had been raped and strangled, with her killer slashing her mouth from ear to ear after death. The body, hastily covered with snow, was later found by a 6-year-old making snowballs on the outskirts of KazGU, an experience which caused him to be unable to speak for several days. Her clothes had been torn apart, and although her purse was missing, investigators ruled out the possibility of a robbery gone wrong. Her boyfriend and future fiancé at the time, a man named Talgat, was initially suspected of killing her, but was later cleared when his blood group didn't match that of the killer - Rh positive. In a futile effort, police looked into convicted criminals with this matching blood group, but to no avail.

A month later, on November 23, another student disappeared in the same area as Aizhan. This time, it was Razia Beisembaeva, (Note: Named 'Madina' in media sources) a student from the Faculty of Mechanics who had gone to visit some friends. While passing through the deserted wasteland at night, she was abducted by Mandzhikov, who threatened her with a knife. Ivan led the crying girl into his basement, mercilessly raped and strangled her, then proceeded to cut off both her legs and throw them into the river, as well as extensively mutilate the rest of the body. After catching wind of Beisembaeva's sudden vanishing, policemen searched all of the surrounding area, but yet again, failing to locate the body. As a result, the Almaty Department of Internal Affairs requested assistance from the Ministry of Internal Affairs.

=== Investigations and suspicions ===
Sensing that they had a serial offender on their hands, investigators started interviewing numerous students in an effort to determine if there had been any previous cases. Surprisingly, one female student admitted to being raped even before Zhumabaeva's murder, and in similar circumstances. While returning to her dorm room, she came across a young man who raped under the threat of "gutting her like a pig". Although she survived their encounter, she was unable to remember much about the attacker, only recalling that he appeared to be of European extraction, tall and in his 20s or 30s. Using these clues, the investigators focused on everybody matching said description, including current and former students of KazGU, the homeless and people living in the area. At some point, they even had five operatives dress up as women in an attempt to lure out the killer, without success. Blood tests were administered to every resident of the area, including medical staff and the police officers themselves.

Soon after, Beisembaeva's corpse was discovered in a quarry. While examining the crime scene, police took interest to one morbidly curious onlooker who had watched them work for more than an hour: he was Ivan Mandzhikov, a former druzhinnik who lived with his younger sister and mother, had a girlfriend, but had no job and had a conviction for rape. His blood was taken for examination, but forensic experts soon learned that there was no match, as Ivan's blood group was from the second group, not the third. He was released soon after, but much to the surprise of the authorities, he kept returning to them and attempted to "help" them solve the case. In one instance, he complained about a foul smell in his building's basement, but after a thorough examination, no such smell was noted, and police simply brushed it off as their "assistant" being mentally deranged.

=== Resumption of the murders ===
On January 21, 1989, the killings resumed, with the new victim being 18-year-old Gulmira Satpayeva, a student from the Faculty of Geography. Like Beisembaeva before her, she was raped, strangled, had her throat slashed and legs dismembered. But this time, Mandzhikov disposed of her body in the wasteland near the university dormitories.

Exactly one month later, a 20-year-old student from the Faculty of Mechanics, Gulbaram Malikova, met with a similar fate. After raping and strangling her, Mandzhikov hid her corpse in the basement of her home on 15 Universitetskaya Street.

== Arrest, trial and execution ==
In the end, Mandzhikov's own mistakes led to his downfall. On June 28, the passer came across a couple, Zhalal Omarova and Berik Bainazarov, who were walking along the Vesnovka River. He went up to them, and declared in Berik's face his intentions of having sex with the girl. Before Bainazarov could fight back, he was stabbed with a knife and died on the spot. Mandzhikov then turned his attention towards Zhalal, ordering her to undress. But before he could do anything, a group of passers-by saw that something was going on, and frightened off the killer. Omarova was later interviewed by authorities, and when shown a photograph of Ivan Mandzhikov, she immediately recognized him as the assailant. Police went to his home to arrest him, finding that Ivan was washing his clothes from what appeared to be traces of blood. Despite his refusal to cooperate, he was taken into the police headquarters for interrogation.

Although he was positively connected to the attack on the couple, Mandzhikov categorically denied any and all accusations against him. He took a second blood examination, but this time, the sample was sent to Moscow. It later revealed that, in fact, Ivan's blood indeed matched that of the "Kazgugrad Monster", but as the Kazakhstani labs lacked the proper technology for analysis, it wasn't properly determined in time. After learning of this new development, Mandzhikov started to confess his crimes. Speaking in a monotonous voice and missing no details, he described he would go out on nightly hunts on the university grounds, looking for potential victims. He also revealed that he gave away all of the victims' jewelry, handbags and other personal items to his sister or girlfriend. When asked why he tried to help in what was essentially a search for himself, Ivan explained that he was simply trying to stave off suspicions from himself.

At trial, Mandzhikov was unrepentant and unremorseful of his crimes, but begged for his life to be spared, even attempting to convince the judge that he was insane. A forensic psychiatric exam proved that was not the case, however, and Ivan Mandzhikov was sentenced to death. In 1993, he was executed in Almaty's Detention Center No. 1.

== See also ==
- List of serial killers by country

== TV documentaries ==
- "The Investigation Uncovered" - "Killed in the moonlight", hosted by Leonid Kanevsky
