= List of tallest buildings in Uzbekistan =

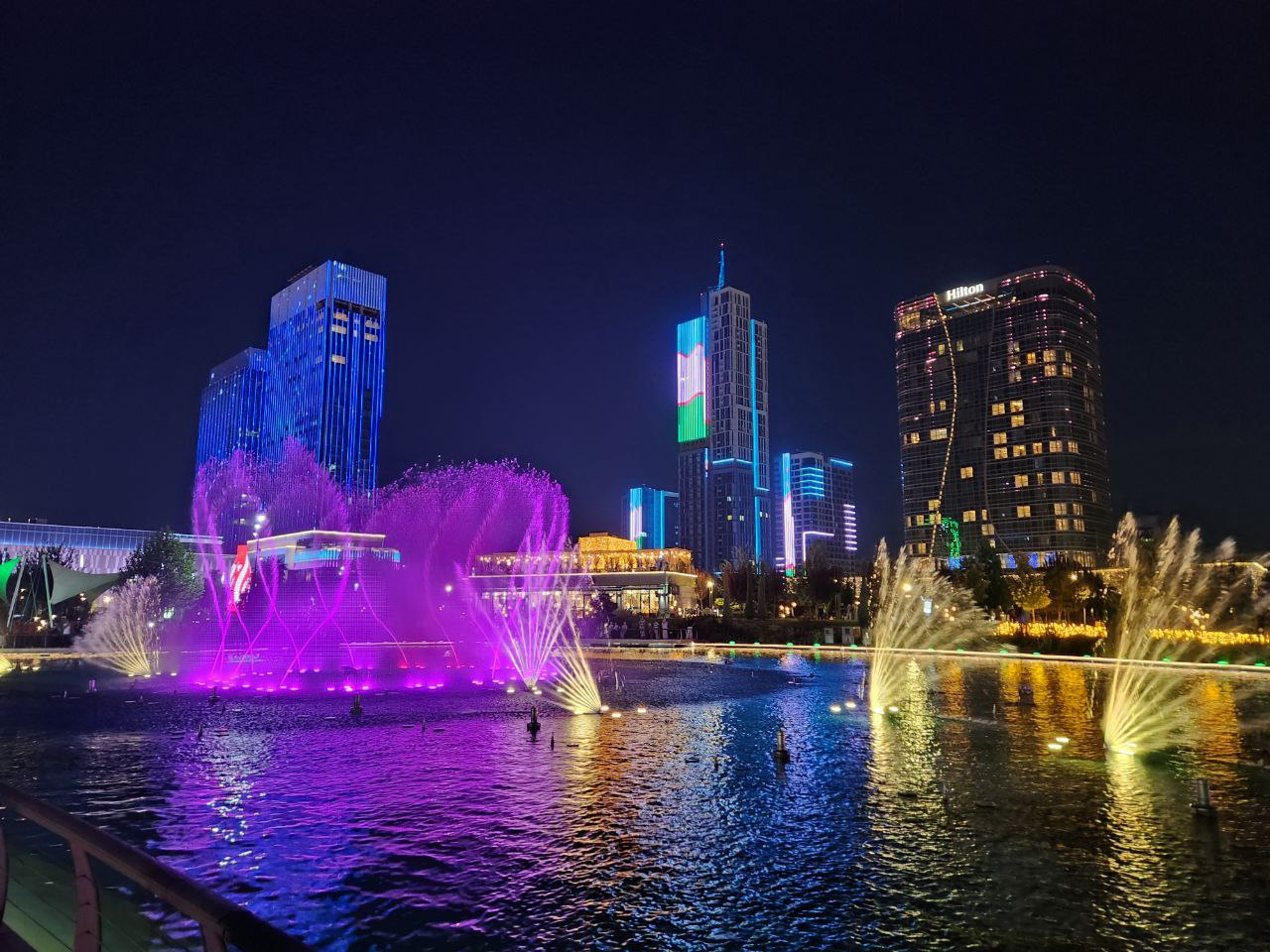
Tashkent Skyline at Night

Skyline of Tashkent with Nest One

This list ranks buildings in Uzbekistan that are at least 100 metres (328 ft) tall. Only habitable buildings are included, excluding radio masts and towers, observation towers, minarets, chimneys, and other non-habitable structures.

High-rise construction has historically been uncommon in Uzbek cities. Traditional city skylines have been dominated by religious, cultural, and historical structures rather than tall modern buildings. Large-scale high-rise development is a relatively recent phenomenon and is largely concentrated in the capital, Tashkent, which is the country's political, economic, cultural and financial center. The majority of Uzbekistan's tallest buildings are located in Tashkent, particularly in newly developed business districts and residential areas. Outside the capital, high-rise construction remains limited, and regional cities generally retain low- to mid-rise urban profiles. As a result, only a small number of buildings in Uzbekistan exceed 150 metres (492 ft) in height, all of which are located in Tashkent.

The development of high-rise buildings in Uzbekistan began during the Soviet period, especially following the 1966 Tashkent earthquake, which prompted extensive reconstruction and the construction of modern apartment blocks and administrative buildings. Notable early high-rise structures include Soviet-era panel houses, residential towers and government buildings built in Tashkent in the late 20th century. In the 21st century, new commercial, residential, and mixed-use developments have contributed to a growing modern skyline, reflecting increased urban development and economic growth.

As of 2026, the tallest building in Uzbekistan is currently Nest One, located in the Tashkent City Park at a height of 266.5 m (874 ft).

== Tallest buildings ==
Was the tallest building in Uzbekistan upon completion

This list ranks buildings in Uzbekistan that stand at least 100 metres (328 ft) tall. This includes spires and architectural details, but does not include antenna masts.

Rank	Name	Image	City	Height (m)	Height (ft)	Floors	Year	Notes	Ref.
1	Nest One		Tashkent	266.5	874.3	51	2023	Tallest building in Uzbekistan.	
2	Piramit Tower		Tashkent	203	666	52	2024		
3	SQB Financial Center		Tashkent	161	528	33	2023		
4	BoMI Finance Center		Tashkent	144	472	30	2025		
5	Aloqa Bank Financial Center		Tashkent	140	459	26	2023		
6	Asaka Bank Financial Center		Tashkent	136	446	26	2023		
7	JW Marriott Hotel		Tashkent	130	426	31	2024		
8	Tashkent City Summit Tower		Tashkent	130	426	30	2024		
9	Tashkent City Mall Residences		Tashkent	130	426	30	2024		
10	NRG U-Tower		Tashkent	110	361	26	2023		
11	Nest One Smart		Tashkent	110	361	23	2023		
12	Nest One Office		Tashkent	110	361	23	2023		
13	National Bank of Uzbekistan		Tashkent	108	354	26	1997		
14	IT Park Tower 1		Tashkent	105	344	25	2022		
15	IT Park Tower 2		Tashkent	105	344	25	2022		
16	Modera Tower 1		Tashkent	103	338	24	2023		
17	Modera Tower 2		Tashkent	103	338	24	2023		
18	Agrobank Head Quarter Tower		Tashkent	102.5	336	22	2023		
19	Central Plaza Tower		Tashkent	102.5	336	22	2023		
20	IT Park Tower 3		Tashkent	100	238	22	2022		
21	IT Park Tower 4		Tashkent	100	238	22	2022		
22	InterContinental Tashkent Hotel		Tashkent	100	238	20	2023		

== Buildings under construction ==
This list ranks buildings under construction in Uzbekistan that plan to stand at least 100 metres (328 ft) tall. This includes spires and architectural details, but does not include antenna masts.

Name	City	Height (m)	Height (ft)	Floors	Year	Notes	Ref.
Hills Blue	Tashkent	180	590	44	2028		
New Port	Tashkent	141	462	34	2028		
The Ritz-Carlton	Tashkent	136	446	31	2028	Will be Uzbekistan’s first ultra-luxury hotel.	
Radisson Collection	Tashkent	131	430	23	2027		
C1	Tashkent	123	403	30	2028		
Labzak Park City	Tashkent	122	400	32	2027		
Agalarov Residence	Tashkent	112	367	27	2028		
Golden Tower 1	Tashkent	110	360	28	2027		
Golden Tower 2	Tashkent	110	360	28	2027		
New Chorsu Hotel	Tashkent	110	360	29	2029		
Eco Tower	Fergana	108	354	30	2027		
Mirabad Square Tower M1	Tashkent	100	328	27	2027		
Mirabad Square Tower M2	Tashkent	100	328	27	2027		

== Proposed ==
This list ranks proposed buildings in Uzbekistan that plan to stand at least 100 metres (328 ft) tall. This includes spires and architectural details but does not include antenna masts.

Name	City	Height (m)	Height (ft)	Floors	Year	Notes	Ref.
Tashkent Twin City Towers 1	Tashkent	575	1,886	119	2045		
Tashkent Twin City Towers 2	Tashkent	395	1,196	81	2045		
Foton JSC Twin Towers	Tashkent	~200	~700	53			
Paragon Hotel	Tashkent	156	512	26			
PrimaDoma	Tashkent	~130	~430	30			
Maidan Towers 1	Tashkent	+100	+328	+50			
Maidan Towers 2	Tashkent	+100	+328	+50			
Kuşbegi Twintower 1	Tashkent	+100	+328	+40			
Kuşbegi Twintower 2	Tashkent	+100	+328	+35			
Aksel Residence 1	Tashkent	+100	+328	+30			
Aksel Residence 2	Tashkent	+100	+328	+30			

== Unbuilt ==
This list ranks unbuilt buildings in Uzbekistan that were planned to stand at least 100 metres (328 ft) tall, but whose construction was subsequently cancelled. This includes spires and architectural details but does not include antenna masts.

Name	City	Height (m)	Height (ft)	Floors	Year	Notes	Ref.
Day and Night Twin Towers	Tashkent	230	755	50	2020	The project was developed by the Turkish company Iki Design Group. Its cost was estimated at 1 billion US dollars.	
Tashkent City Zone 4 Tower	Tashkent	200	656	40	2018	Zone 4 holds Uzbekistan's current tallest building. This 200-meter tower was originally planned as the nation's tallest skyscraper—featuring a five-star Ritz-Carlton hotel—before being cancelled in favor of Nest One.	
Minerva City Twin Towers 1	Tashkent	180	590	40	2020	Proposed by MJ Developers but cancelled because they missed construction deadlines. Following a legal battle, the Tashkent government revoked the agreement and seized the land, abandoning the project.	
Minerva City Twin Towers 2	Tashkent	180	590	40	2020	Proposed by MJ Developers but cancelled because they missed construction deadlines. Following a legal battle, the Tashkent government revoked the agreement and seized the land, abandoning the project.	
M Tower	Tashkent	136	446	27	2018	The building was designed by the Moscow architectural bureau Tochka Dizayna for Murad Buildings and was scheduled to open in 2020.	

== Timeline of tallest buildings ==
Name	Image	City	Height (m)	Height (ft)	Floors	Years as tallest
House of Ministries		Tashkent	90	295	22	1972–1982 (shortened)
Chorsu Hotel		Tashkent	100	328	23	1982–1997 (demolished)
National Bank of Uzbekistan		Tashkent	108	354	26	1997–2023
Nest One		Tashkent	266.5	874.3	51	2023–present

== See also ==
- List of tallest structures in Uzbekistan
- List of tallest structures in Central Asia
- List of tallest buildings in Asia
