= Tashkent Tower =

Broadcast tower in Uzbekistan

Coordinates: 41°20′44.05″N 69°17′4.57″E

Tashkent TV Tower
- Toshkent Teleminorasi (Uzbek); Ташкентская телебашня (Russian)
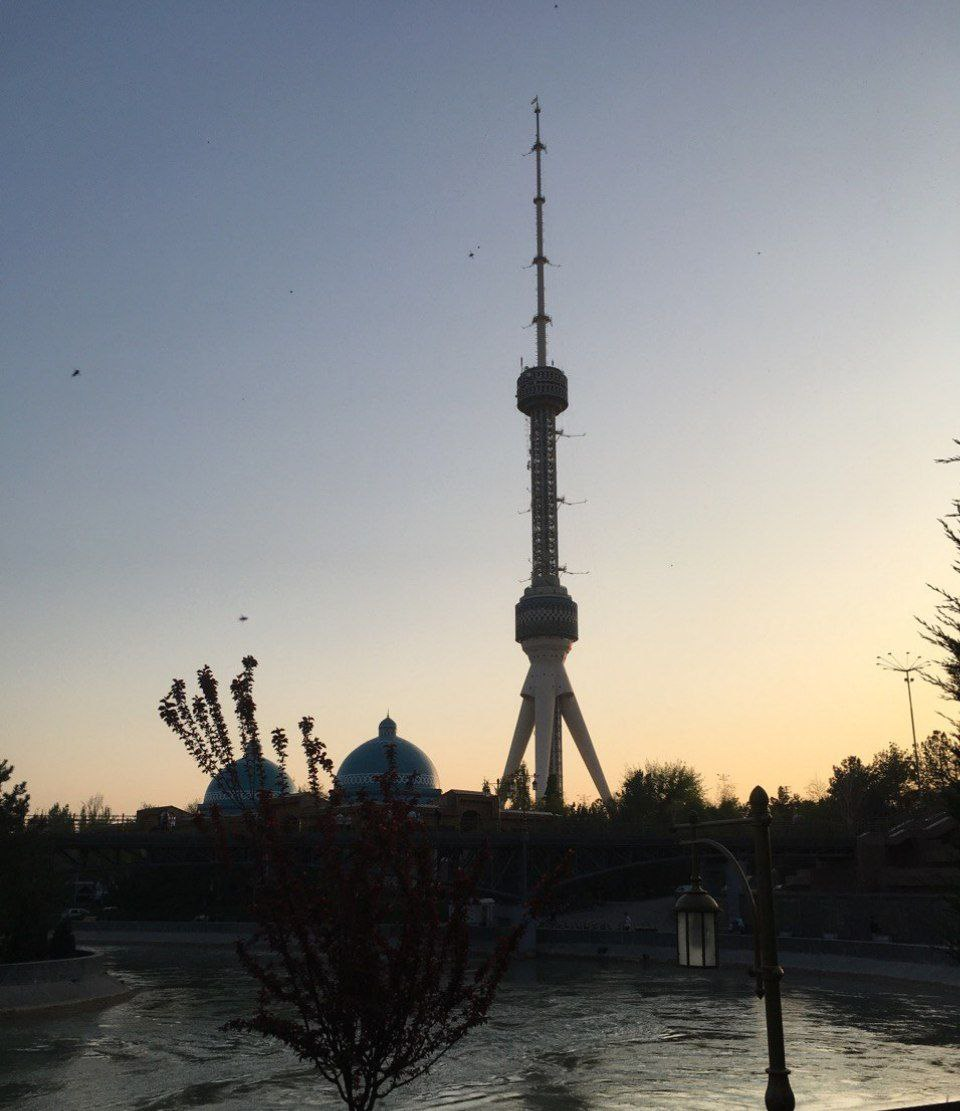
- Tashkent Tower

General information
- Type: TV-translation, Radio-translation, communication, hydrometeorological research
- Location: Tashkent, Uzbekistan
- Construction started: 1978
- Completed: 1984

Height
- Antenna spire: 375 m (1,230.3 ft)
- Top floor: 97 m (318.2 ft), observation deck

Technical details
- Lifts/elevators: 3

Design and construction
- Architects: Y.P. Semashko, I.N. Terziev-Tsarukov
- Main contractor: E.P. Morozov, M.D. Musheev

The Tashkent Television Tower (Uzbek: Toshkent Teleminorasi, Russian: Ташкентская телебашня) is a 375-metre-high (1,230 ft) tower, located in Tashkent, Uzbekistan and is the twelfth tallest tower in the world. Construction started in 1978. The tower began operating six years later, on 15 January 1985. It was the fourth tallest tower in the world from 1985 to 1991. The decision to construct the tower was made on 1 September 1971 in order to spread TV and radio signals throughout Uzbekistan. It is a vertical cantilever structure, and is constructed out of steel. Its architectural design is a product of the Terkhiev, Tsarukov & Semashko firm.

The tower has an observation deck located 97 metres (318 ft) above the ground. It is the second tallest structure in Central Asia after Ekibastuz GRES-2 Power Station in Ekibastuz, Kazakhstan. It also belongs to the World Federation of Great Towers.

== Use ==
Tashkent Tower at night

The main purposes of the tower are radio and TV-transmission. The signal reaches the furthest points of Tashkent Region and some of the southern regions of Kazakhstan. The tower is used for communication between governmental departments, and organizations. The tower also serves as a complex hydrometeorological station.

== See also ==
- List of tallest structures in Uzbekistan
- List of tallest structures in Central Asia
- List of the world's tallest structures
- List of tallest towers in the world
- List of tallest freestanding structures in the world
- List of tallest freestanding steel structures
- Lattice tower
