= Yyldyz Hotel =

Luxury hotel in Ashgabat, Turkmenistan

Coordinates: 37.9294°N 58.3719°E

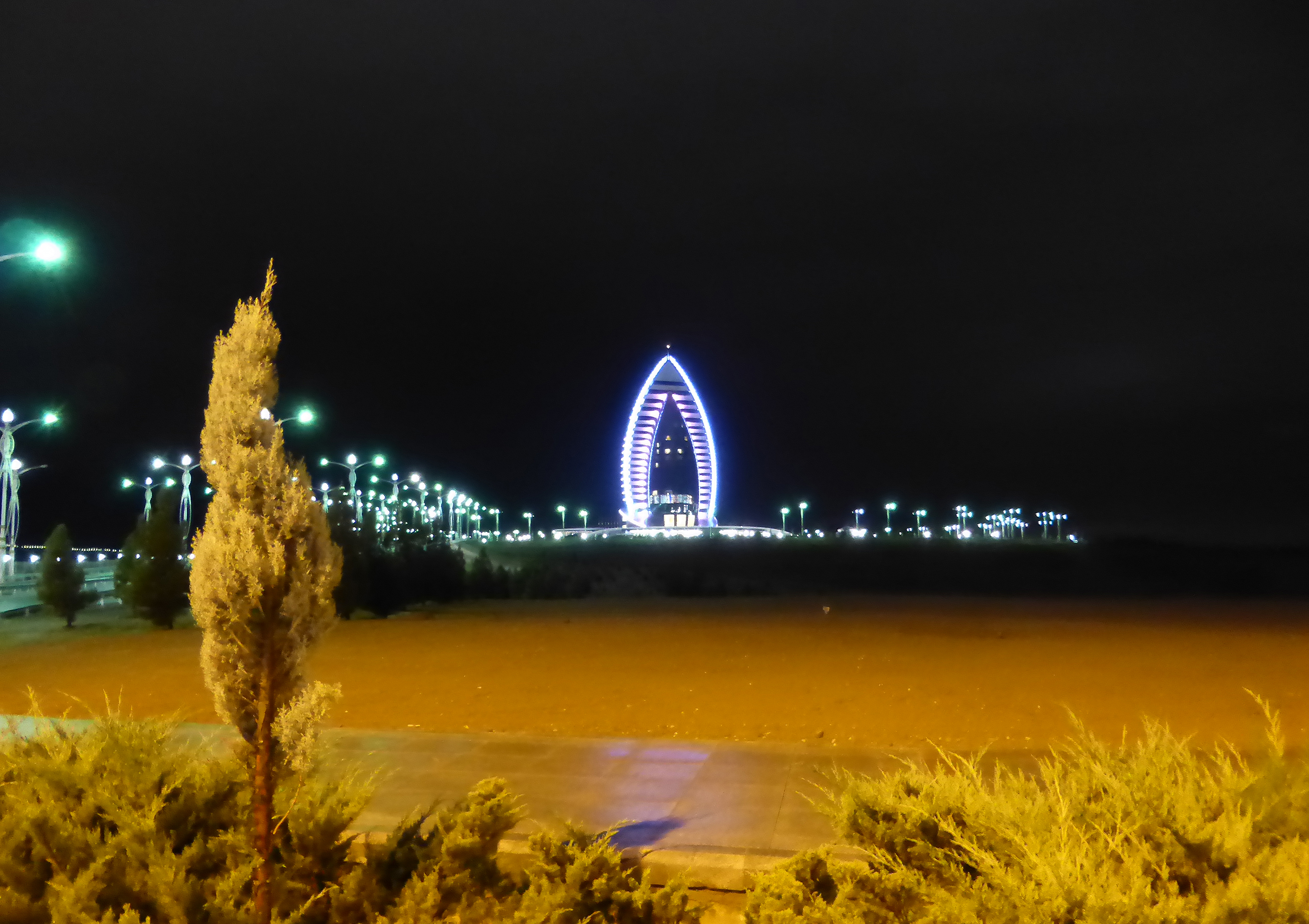
- Interactive map of the Yyldyz Hotel area

General information
- Status: Completed
- Type: Hotel
- Location: Ashgabat, Turkmenistan
- Construction started: 2011
- Completed: 2013
- Opening: 15.10.2013

Height
- Architectural: 107 m (351 ft)

Design and construction
- Structural engineer: Bouygues

Website
- https://yyldyzhotel.gov.tm/

Yyldyz Hotel (Turkmen: Ýyldyz oteli) is a luxury hotel located in Ashgabat, Turkmenistan. Built in 2013 by Bouygues, it has 155 rooms. It is a 24-story hotel, with a height of 107 meters.

== Design and construction ==
In the construction of the high-rise hotel tower, about seven thousand tons of steel and more than 14,000 square meters of glass were used. The building has a teardrop shape. The total area is 50,620 square meters. The surrounding land has an area of roughly 85,000 square meters. The structure has a high degree of seismic resistance.

== Features ==
The hotel has 155 rooms, including presidential, deluxe and standard rooms. On the first floor there is a large banquet hall with 1000 seats. VIP apartments are located on the 14th floor. On the 18th floor there is a panoramic restaurant with 600 seats.

== See also ==
- List of tallest structures in Turkmenistan
- List of tallest structures in Central Asia
