= Esentai Complex =

Mixed-use development along the Esentai River in Almaty, Kazakhstan

Coordinates: 43°13′6″N 76°55′46″E

Esentai Complex is a 368,000-square-metre (3,960,000 sq ft) mixed-use development along the Esentai River in Almaty, Kazakhstan.

The complex includes:

- Esentai Tower, including
  - 27,000 square metres (290,000 sq ft) of Class A office space
  - Level 8, a co-working and office space
- Esentai Mall, a luxury shopping center opened in October 2012 by Eva Herzigova
  - anchored by a Saks Fifth Avenue department store
  - home to boutiques of luxury brands such as Tiffany & Co., Valentino, Dolce and Gabbana, Louis Vuitton, Burberry, Stella McCartney, Gucci, Ralph Lauren, Loro Piana, Tommy Hilfiger and Fendi
- Esentai Park
- Esentai Square
- a Ritz-Carlton hotel, and
- Serviced apartments and smart apartments

Capital Tower Development manages the complex.

The shopping center saw a rebound in sales in 2018 after several years of struggle triggered by the 2008 depreciation of the Kazakh currency.
