= Grand Alatau =

Residential building complex in Astana, Kazakhstan

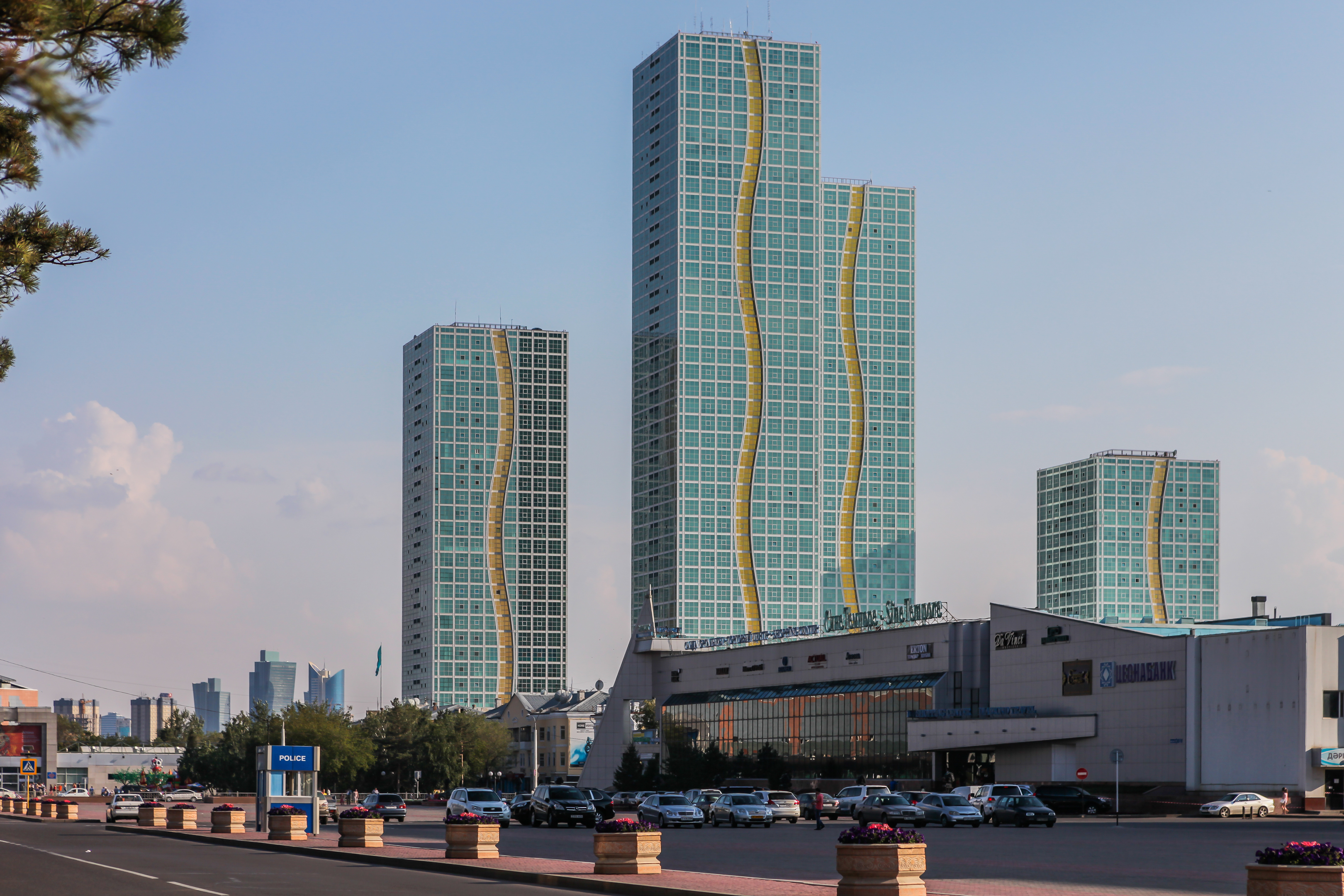
- Grand Alatau in July 2012
- Interactive map of the Grand Alatau area

General information
- Status: Completed
- Type: Residential
- Location: Astana, Kazakhstan
- Coordinates: 51°09′43.5″N 71°25′11.1″E
- Construction started: 2006
- Completed: 2009
- Cost: $250,000,000

Height
- Roof: Tower 1: 78 m (256 ft); Tower 2: 96 m (315 ft); Tower 3: 153 m (502 ft); Tower 4: 131 m (430 ft)

Technical details
- Floor count: Tower 1: 20; Tower 2: 28; Tower 3: 43; Tower 4: 38

Design and construction
- Architect: Shokhan Mataibekov
- Main contractor: KUAT

Grand Alatau is a residential building complex situated in Astana, Kazakhstan. The development consists of four high-rise buildings, the tallest of which reaches a height of 153 m (502 ft) and contains 43 floors. As of 2026, the 43-story tower currently stands as the tallest residential building in Kazakhstan. The complex is located within the historical center of the city on the right bank of the Ishim River, positioned directly across from the Central Park.

== Height misidentification ==
Grand Alatau 3, the tallest skyscraper within the four-tower development, has been subject to widespread height misidentification in various architectural databases and media reports. The structure was frequently recorded as having a structural height of 144 m (472 ft); however, data derived from 3D drone scans and official engineering records confirm that the tower reaches a true architectural height of 153 m (502 ft). This correction establishes the building as the tallest residential building in Kazakhstan as of 2026, resolving previous discrepancies regarding its exact position in the national skyline hierarchy.

== See also ==
- List of tallest buildings in Astana
- List of tallest buildings in Kazakhstan
- List of tallest structures in Central Asia
