= List of tallest buildings in Astana =

Astana, the capital city of Kazakhstan, is home to 118 completed high-rises, 9 of which stand at least 150 metres (490 ft) tall. The tallest building in Astana is the Abu Dhabi Plaza, which rises 311 metres (1,020 ft) and was completed in 2021. It also stands as the tallest building in Kazakhstan and Central Asia.

== Tallest buildings ==
This list ranks skyscrapers in Astana that stand at least 100 metres (328 ft) tall, based on standard height measurement. This includes spires and architectural details but does not include antenna masts. The "Year" column indicates the year in which a building was completed.

Rank	Name	Image	Height m (ft)	Floors	Year	Coordinates	Notes
1	Abu Dhabi Plaza		311 (1,020)	75	2022	51.122515°N 71.428235°E	Tallest building in Kazakhstan and Central Asia.
2	Emerald Towers 1		210 (689)	53	2012	51.130717°N 71.423643°E	
3	Northern Lights 1		180 (591)	42	2008	51°07′41″N 71°25′20″E	
4	Kazakhstan Railways Building 2		174 (571)	40	2010	51.130731°N 71.421368°E	
5	Kazakhstan Railways Building 2		156 (512)	37	2010	51.130731°N 71.421368°E	
6	Emerald Towers 2		155 (509)	37	2010	51.130717°N 71.423643°E	
7	Transport Tower		155 (509)	34	2003	51.131384°N 71.416594°E	
8	Grand Alatau 3		153 (502)	43	2009	51.161944°N 71.419722°E	
9	Northern Lights 2		152 (499)	37	2008	51°07′41″N 71°25′20″E	
10	Khan Shatyr Entertainment Center		150 (492)	5	2010	51°07′56″N 71°24′14″E	Tallest tent in the world.
11	Talan Tower 1		146 (479)	30	2017	51°07′41″N 71°25′20″E	
12	Triumph of Astana		142 (466)	39	2006	51.140222°N 71.414952°E	
13	Northern Lights 3		128 (420)	32	2010	51°07′41″N 71°25′20″E	
14	Talan Tower 2		120 (394)	26	2017	51°07′41″N 71°25′20″E	
15	Mazhilis Building		100 (328)	22	2004	51.127637°N 71.441174°E	

== Approved or proposed ==
This list ranks skyscrapers that are approved or proposed in Astana, and are planned to rise at least 100 metres (328 ft) tall.

Rank	Name	Height m (ft)	Floors	Planned Completion	Status
1	Tengri Tower	500 (1,640)	100	–	Proposed
2	World Trade Center	350 (1,148)	–	–	Proposed
3	The Seven Towers	230 (755)	60	–	Approved
4	Astana Tower	192 (630)	47	–	Proposed
5	World Trade Center 2	150 (492)	–	–	Proposed
6	Tower of the Sun	121 (397)	31	–	Proposed
