= Turkmenistan Tower =

Communications and observation tower in Ashgabat, Turkmenistan

Coordinates: 37°51′45″N 58°14′17″E

"Turkmenistan" Tower
- Interactive map of the "Turkmenistan" Tower area
- Alternative names: TV and Radio Center "Turkmenistan"

General information
- Status: Completed
- Type: observation, telecommunications, attraction, restaurant
- Location: Ashgabat, Turkmenistan
- Construction started: 2008
- Completed: 2011

Height
- Height: 211 metres (692 ft)

Design and construction
- Architect: Polimeks

The Turkmenistan Tower (Turkmen: «Türkmenistan» teleradio merkezi) is a communications and observation tower in Ashgabat, Turkmenistan. It was completed in 2011. At 211 metres (692 ft), the tower is the tallest structure in Turkmenistan.

== History ==
Construction began in 2008 by Turkish company Polimeks.

It was completed on October 17, 2011, when President Gurbanguly Berdimuhamedow held the official opening ceremony.

== Function ==
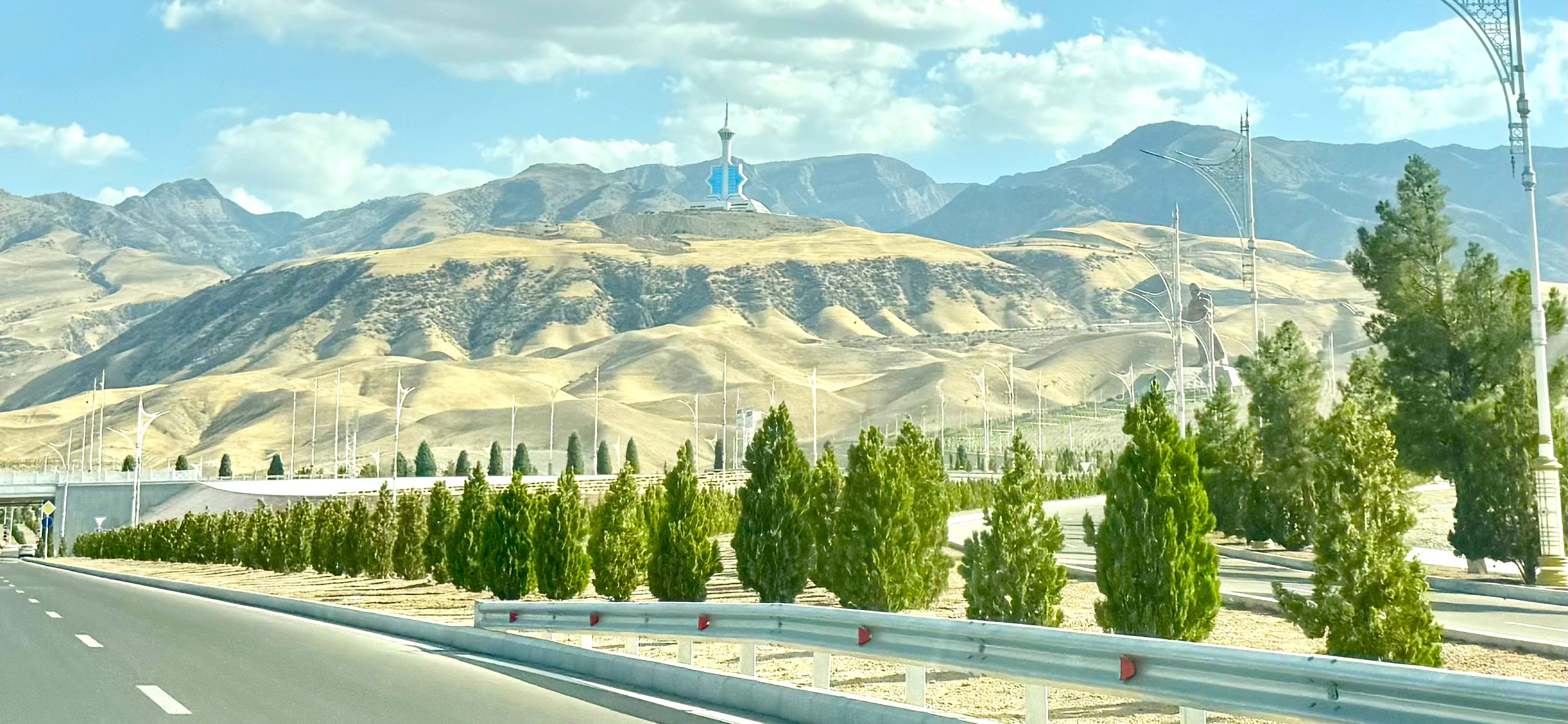
View of the TV tower at Kopetdag Mountains

The main function of the tower is to serve TV and radiocommunication antennas, but apart from that there are also organized tourist centers with a variety of interesting attractions. The radius covered by the signal from the antenna is about 100 kilometers. Currently, the tower transmits analog TV, digital TV and radio. Client antenna towers are the following stations: Altyn Asyr, Yashlyk, Miras, Turkmenistan, Turkmen Owazy, Ashgabat, and Turkmen Sport.

At a height of 145 meters (29th floor), a revolving restaurant is located in the interior, which features the combination of the elements of national decor and modern trends in architectural styles. From there, you can admire the views of Ashgabat and local natural scenery, while the rotating platform on which the restaurant is located, provides a panoramic view. At a height of 140 meters (on the 28th floor), there is a VIP room.

In the tower there are two viewing platforms available for visitors - the main and the special observatory, both offer a 360-degree view. The main observatory is located at an altitude of 150 meters (on the 30th floor); there is a good view of modern Ashgabat from the main observatory, as well as beautifully landscaped open spaces and the foothills of Kopetdag.

The decorative octagonal "Star of Oguzkhan" is recognized as the world's largest architectural image of the star and entered in the Guinness Book of Records. The TV Tower is located at an altitude of 1000 meters above sea level, and is visible from almost anywhere in Ashgabat and its suburbs.

== See also ==
- List of tallest structures in Turkmenistan
- List of tallest structures in Central Asia
- List of the world's tallest structures
- List of towers
- List of tallest freestanding structures in the world

== Links ==
- TV Tower Ashgabat
