= List of tallest structures in Turkmenistan =

This is a list of the tallest structures in Turkmenistan. This list contains all tower, buildings and other structures in Turkmenistan based on standard height.

== Tallest structures ==
This list ranks the structures in Turkmenistan that stand at least 90 m (295 ft). Only completed buildings and structured are included.

Name	Image	Location	Pinnacle height	Year built	Structural type	Coordinates	Remarks
Turkmenistan Tower		Ashgabat	211 m (692 ft)	2011	Tower		
Monument to the Constitution		Ashgabat	185 m (607 ft)	2011	Monument		
Independence Monument		Ashgabat	118 m (387 ft)	2001	Monument		
Yyldyz Hotel		Ashgabat	107 m (351 ft)	2013	Hotel		
The Ministry of Oil and Mineral Resources of Turkmenistan		Ashgabat	103 m (338 ft)	2003	Ministry		
The Ministry of Trade and Foreign Economic Relations of Turkmenistan		Ashgabat	103 m (338 ft)	2008	Ministry		
Neutrality Monument		Ashgabat	95 m (312 ft)	1998	Arch		

== See also ==
- List of tallest structures in Central Asia
- List of tallest structures in the former Soviet Union
