= U Tower =

Planned building complex in Uzbekistan

Coordinates: 41°18′39.8″N 69°14′21.3″E

- Interactive map of the U Tower area

General information
- Status: Completed
- Type: Offices, apartments, public spaces, restaurants and luxury shopping gallery.
- Location: Tashkent, Uzbekistan
- Construction started: 2019
- Completed: 2022
- Opening: 2023

Height
- Antenna spire: 110 m (360 ft)
- Roof: 110 m (360 ft)

Technical details
- Floor count: 30
- Floor area: 187,160 m^{2} (2,014,600 sq ft)
- Lifts/elevators: 9

Design and construction
- Architect: ООО MB Studio
- Structural engineer: СП ООО «Architects Development» (NRG Uzbekistan)
- Main contractor: Subcontractеr

Website
- u-tower.u-nrg.uz

U-Tower (Russian: Ю-Тауэр) is a multi-functional residential complex located in the Shayxontoxur district of Tashkent, at the intersection of Islam Karimov Street and Bunyodkor Avenue. The main building consists of 30 floors, encompassing residential apartments, commercial premises, a two-level underground parking garage, and public areas.

After its construction, U-Tower became the second tallest building in Uzbekistan, following the Nest One complex.

== History ==
The design competition for U-Tower attracted participation from globally renowned architectural firms, including Zaha Hadid, DP Architects Pte. Ltd, Benoy, INK Architects, and others. The local Uzbek firm MB Studio won the competition with its unique concept. The building was constructed by NRG Uzbekistan, leveraging progressive construction techniques from Kazakhstan. The project also incorporated traditional architectural elements of Uzbek culture, provided by the main companies M Buildings and BI Group. The facade design took into account the specific climatic features of the country. Special attention was given to the structure's strength and reliability, considering the region's seismic activity. The building's contours represent the Latin letter "U," symbolizing unity, comfort, and reliability. The name "U" also stands for "United," reflecting the project's theme of connectedness and community. This name sets a distinctive tone for the entire building, inviting expectations of uniqueness and originality.

== Technical specifications and building codes ==
To design the complex, special technical conditions were developed to ensure the seismic resistance of the building's load-bearing structures and to meet specific fire safety standards. The structural layout, dimensions of the load-bearing elements, and the technical specifications of the materials used were verified and approved by Shamil Abdullaevich Khakimov, Ph.D., Senior Researcher, Academician of the International Academy of Engineering, and an international expert on the protection of building structures from earthquakes and mountain hazards (certificate No. 104), and senior researcher at NIPTSSS ANTISEISMIC LLC. The building's calculated seismic resistance is 9 points.

To enhance the building's foundation, 218 bored reinforced concrete piles with a diameter of 1.2 meters and a length of 30 meters were installed, embedded in load-bearing soil - stone loess. These piles were tested for indentation, pullout, and horizontal loads, with the maximum pressing load on one pile reaching 1,000 tons. The main load-bearing frame of the building utilized concrete class B45, grade M600. Instead of welded joints, mechanical coupling joints with rolled threads were used for connecting vertical and horizontal reinforcement, ensuring the reliability of the joints in terms of strength and the ability to control the tightening torque of all connections in the reinforcement cage.

For fire safety, the building is equipped with ventilation systems for air pressure and smoke removal, a fire alarm with a warning system, sprinkler fire extinguishing, and internal fire water supply, along with 24-hour video surveillance of common areas. All utilities and escape routes are protected by fire-resistant materials and fire doors. Staircases are separated from floor corridors by special airlocks with air pressure to ensure smoke-free passages. The building also features a safety zone with a total area of 150 m² to shelter people unable to evacuate in case of fire, and an emergency power supply with its own diesel generator to ensure uninterrupted operation of all key life support systems of the complex.

== Features ==
The residential complex includes 438 apartments, ranging from one to six rooms, as well as two-story penthouses. Shared amenities include a hotel, gym, children's playroom, coworking space, prayer room, walking areas on the third-floor stilobate roof, playground, and workout area. The 27th floor features an open terrace with an observation deck. Additional amenities include a two-level parking garage with electric vehicle charging stations, a Face ID system, smart barriers, 24-hour video surveillance, security at the entrance, and a reception area in the lobby.

== Transport accessibility ==
The "Druzhba Narodov" metro station is within walking distance of the complex.

== Construction progress ==
- July-November 2021: Excavation, pile foundation development, and foundation pouring.
- November-December 2021: Foundation pouring and installation of the monolithic frame for the first floors.
- December 2022: Completion of major monolithic works.
- December 2022: Start of facade construction work.

== Awards ==
- 2023: Unusual Design
- 2023: Most Complex Construction of the Year
- 2023: Beautiful Design
