= Esentai River =

Esentai Vesnovka
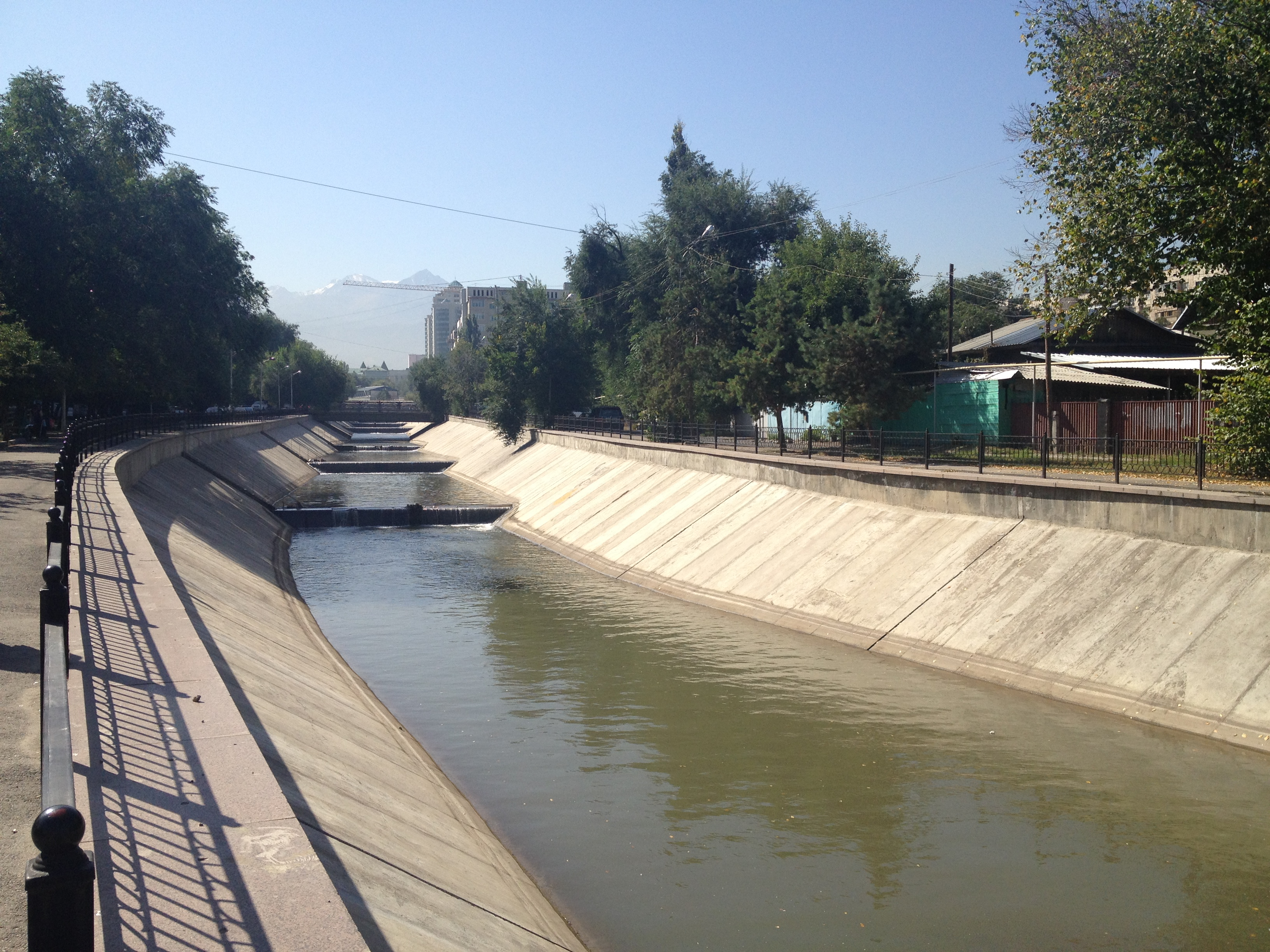
- Native name: Esentai (Kazakh); Весновка (Russian)

Location
- Country: Kazakhstan
- State: Almaty Region
- City: Almaty

Physical characteristics
- Mouth: Malaya Almatinka
  - coordinates: 43.4189°N 77.0022°E
- Length: 43 km (27 mi)

Basin features
- Progression: Malaya Almatinka→ Kaskelen→ Ili→ Lake Balkhash

The Esentai (Kazakh: Есентай), also known as the Vesnovka in Russian, (Russian: Весновка) is a left branch river of the Malaya Almatinka (Kazakh: Kishi Almaty). The river bifurcates at the last distributary of the Small Almaty Gorge which runs in the city of Almaty, to the west of the Gornaya Street.

== Geography ==
The length of the river is about 43 km which nearly divides the city in half. In the city of Almaty, the banks and river beds are concreted in the form of the thresholds. In the Zhetysu district of the city, between the streets of Pavlodar and North Ring, the canal of the river is completely covered. It comes back to the surface in the area of the village Pervomaika where the river divides into branches and channels that are used for irrigation, while the remaining water ends up in the sewers. The main channel of the river turns right, and then joins the river Karasu-Turksib, which flows directly into the Small Almaty River.

== Economy ==
In the area of Almaty, a pedestrian walkway is along the river embankment, and recreation areas include a park in the complex of Al-Farabi University, an amusement park called "Fantasy World", and a park square near the Auezov Theater. The water is also used for domestic and irrigation purposes.

== See also ==
- Esentai Complex, a 368,000 square metre mixed-use complex including the Esentai Tower, shopping mall, park, square, a Ritz-Carlton hotel, and serviced apartments
