= Nest One =

Building complex in Uzbekistan

General information
- Status: Completed
- Type: Offices, apartments, public spaces, hotel, restaurants and luxury shopping gallery
- Classification: Mixed-use development
- Location: Tashkent, Uzbekistan
- Coordinates: 41°18′44″N 69°15′07″E
- Construction started: 2019
- Completed: 2022
- Opening: 2023
- Cost: 150 million dollars

Height
- Antenna spire: 266.5 m
- Roof: 266.5 m (874 ft)
- Top floor: 51

Technical details
- Floor count: 51
- Floor area: 187,160 m^{2} (2,014,600 sq ft)
- Lifts/elevators: 34
- Grounds: 15000 sq m

Design and construction
- Architect: Özgüven Architecture (project manager)
- Developer: Murad Buildings
- Structural engineer: LLC Universal Packing Masters Murad Buildings; Özgüven Tasarım Mimarlik Inşaat Sanayı; Ticaret A.Ş

Other information
- Number of stores: 52+2
- Number of units: 700
- Number of suites: 1000
- Facilities: Gym, paddle tennis, screening room, boxing ring, karaoke, rooftop terrace, restaurants, bars, kafes, shops, viewing deck, observatory and more
- Parking: 3 floor, below the ground parking spaces
- Public transit: Ozbekiston (Tashkent Metro)

Website
- nestone.uz

Nest One is a mixed-use development complex in the very center of Tashkent, the capital of Uzbekistan. Nest One is the tallest building in Uzbekistan and the second tallest structure in the country after TV Tower of Uzbekistan (375 m tall). It is a multifunctional skyscraper, 266.5 m tall, located on the 4th lot of Tashkent City International Business District (TCIBC).

The central and tallest tower of the complex consists of 51 floors and includes residential apartments, offices, restaurants, sports areas and other public spaces. In the adjacent buildings of the complex are office space and a proposed five-star hotel "The Ritz-Carlton".

The total area of the project is 187.284 sq.m. The total area of the land plot is 14.779 sq.m. The project budget is more than 200 million dollars.

"Nest One" is the first skyscraper and currently the tallest building in Uzbekistan, as well as the second tallest building in Central Asia, after the Abu Dhabi Plaza complex in Astana, Kazakhstan. It was completed in 2023.

== History ==
After the announcement of the start of construction of the Tashkent City IBC project, the developer of Lot No. 4 Murad Buildings, for two years, has been negotiating with companies from Japan, Singapore, America and other countries. The choice was made on the company "Özgüven Mimarlık", which had previously implemented projects in Turkey and other countries of the world.

More than 500 specialists worked on the development of the building project. The design of the skyscraper was developed by the Japanese design organization Nihon Sekkei.

The study of the soil composition was undertaken by Zetas Zemin Teknolojisi AS (Turkey), which specializes in the study of soil for the foundation of high-rise structures.

Management of the construction process, costs and deadlines, quality control, ecology, safety and labor protection was entrusted to the French company Bureau Veritas.

The appearance and design of the complex was entrusted to the Singapore architectural bureau DP Architects.

On July 5, 2019, at the Hyatt Regency Tashkent Hotel, during the first presentation of the project, the head of the developer company emphasized that it would be the first skyscraper in the country, and one of the tallest buildings in Central Asia.

On August 29, 2019, a press conference was held where representatives of developer companies presented the architectural plan of the facility and the official name of the skyscraper was announced. The original design of the building called for a height of 215 meters, however, after analyzing the soil and a series of simulations, the height was increased to 266.5 meters.

On September 14, 2019, the sale of premises in the skyscraper started.

== Specifications and building codes ==
When designing the building, various risks were taken into account:

- Seismic resistance tests carried out at Istanbul University have shown that the designed building will withstand an earthquake with an intensity of up to 9 points.
- The German company RWDI tested the effect of wind on the facade of a building. A special analysis was also carried out on the CFD technique, the analysis showed the comfort of pedestrians next to the building.
- The escape routes of the building are protected from smoke thanks to ventilation systems. Fires in the building are controlled by a built-in intelligent system.

To test the bearing capacity of the soil, 28 test wells up to 27 meters deep were made, they were filled with a special concrete mixture. After 28 days, when the concrete had gained 90% of its strength, tests were carried out to determine its real ability in interaction with the pile. Each column was subjected to a pressure of 1400 tons. For the first time in Uzbekistan, a Barret foundation is used for the construction of a building. For the construction of a skyscraper, for the first time in Uzbekistan, concrete grade m800 is used. Especially to provide the future complex with a special brand of concrete, a concrete plant was built on the outskirts of Tashkent city, where 4 million dollars were invested.

== Particular qualities ==
Nest One building at night

The complex has 1061 luxury apartments with the number of rooms from 1 to 8 and an area of 37- 411 sq.m. and equipped with a "smart home" system. With it, all systems in the house can be remotely controlled. The house is equipped with 24-hour video surveillance cameras with a security service working. There are more than 33 public spaces in the building, including guest rooms, conference halls, a spa/salon, a fitness center, a swimming pool, a library, etc. Own management company solves utility, technical and household issues of the complex.

== Transport accessibility ==
In walking distance from the complex, there is a metro station called "Ozbekistan" in the Blue line of Tashkent metro.

== Construction progress ==
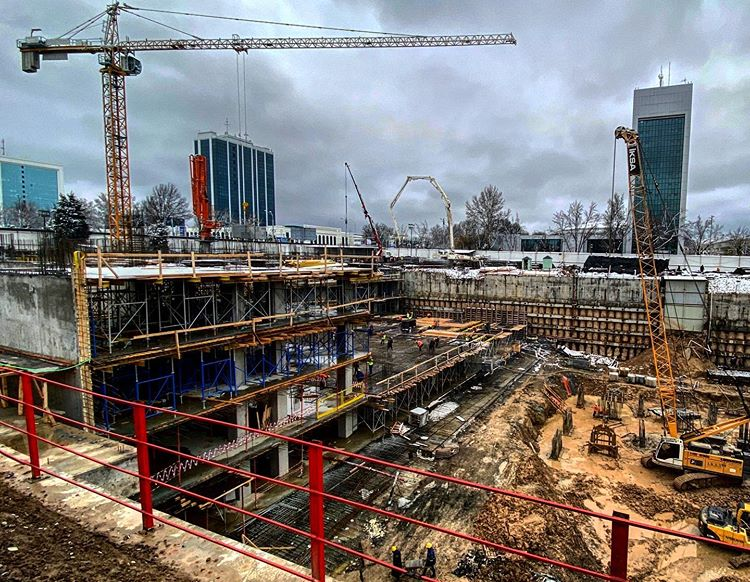
Construction progress in 2020

- 2018 — preparatory, design work on the facility
- 2019 - the creation of a plant to provide the complex with concrete, work on the creation of a pit, work began on the construction of a pile field and foundation. Reinforcement and concreting of underground floors has begun.
- 2020 — foundation work started.
- May 2020 - the last barret in the central block is poured. The laying of the foundation slab has begun.
- July 11, 2020 - the beginning of pouring the first batch of concrete under the foundation in the central block.
- September 1, 2021 - 51st floor commissioned.
- September 4, 2022 - 36 meter long antenna installed.
- 2023 - Completed

== Awards and nominations ==
- The Strongest Building of 2021.
- The Most Popular Brand of 2021 in Uzbekistan.
