= Emerald Towers =

Skyscraper complex in Astana, Kazakhstan

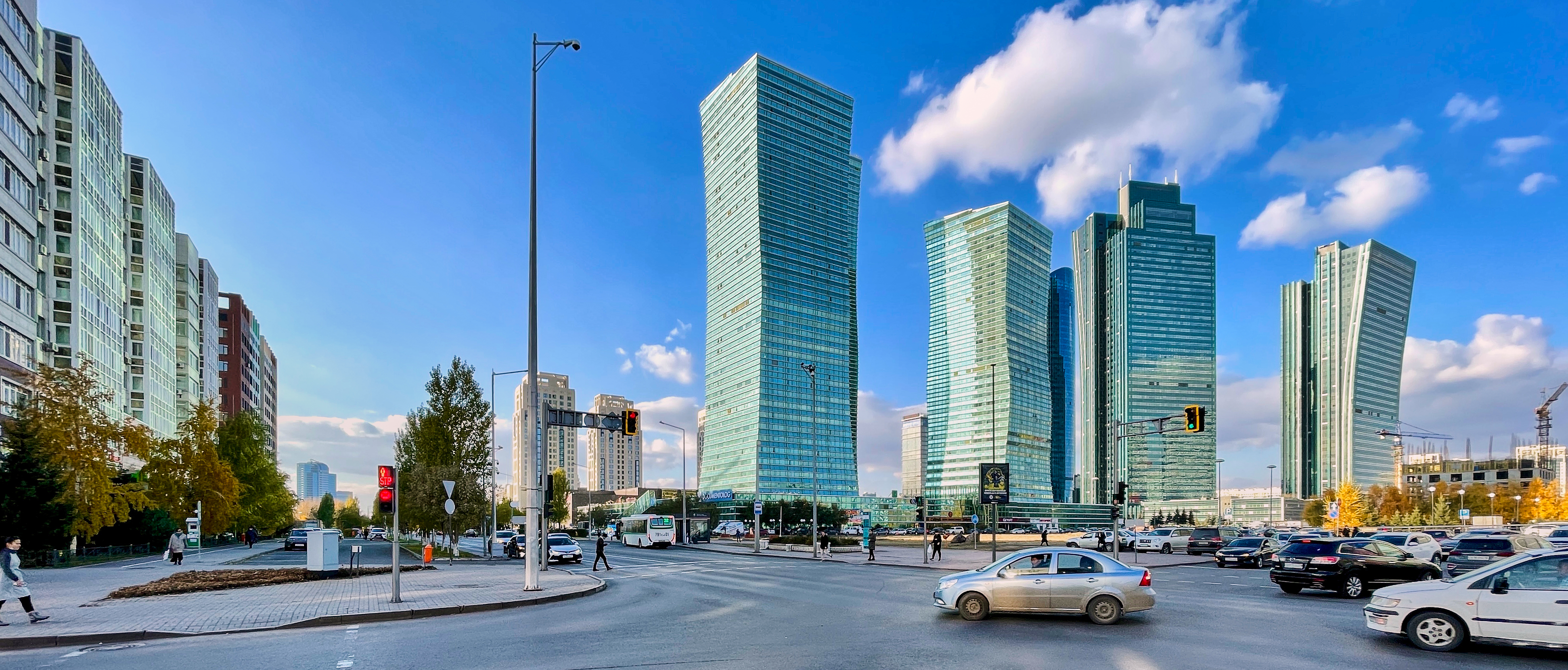
- Emerald Towers in October 2021
- Interactive map of the Emerald Towers area

General information
- Status: Completed
- Type: Office
- Location: Astana, Kazakhstan
- Coordinates: 51°07′50.0″N 71°25′22.3″E
- Construction started: 2006
- Completed: 2012
- Cost: $350,000,000

Height
- Roof: Block A: 151 m (495 ft); Block B: 201 m (659 ft)

Technical details
- Floor count: Block A: 37; Block B: 49
- Floor area: 280,000 m^{2} (3,013,895 sq ft)

Design and construction
- Architect: Roy Varacalli
- Developer: Bazis-A

The Emerald Towers (Russian: Изумрудный квартал), also known as the Emerald Quarter, is an office building complex in Astana, Kazakhstan, consisting of two skyscrapers designated as Block A and Block B. Block A rises 151 m (495 ft) tall with 37 floors, while Block B stands at 201 m (659 ft) tall with 49 floors. Upon its completion, Block B held the title of the tallest building in Kazakhstan for a decade until it was surpassed by the Abu Dhabi Plaza in 2022.

The complex serves primarily as a business center featuring office spaces, a gym, and dining areas. Construction of the complex began in 2006 and was fully completed in 2012. Originally, the complex was also planned to include a third tower, Block C, which was designed to stand 170 m (558 ft) tall with 43 floors, but it was never built due to the Great Recession of 2008.
