= Talan Towers =

Building complex in Kazakhstan

- Interactive map of the Talan Towers area

General information
- Status: Completed
- Type: Mixed-use
- Location: Astana, Kazakhstan
- Coordinates: 51.12466°N 71.43232°E
- Construction started: June 2013
- Completed: 2017
- Inaugurated: 29 September 2017

Height
- Height: Tower 1: 145.6 m (478 ft); Tower 2: 119.8 m (393 ft)

Technical details
- Floor count: Tower 1: 30; Tower 2: 25
- Grounds: 120,000 m2

Design and construction
- Architecture firm: Skidmore, Owings & Merrill
- Developer: Astana Property Management

Website
- Official website

Talan Towers is a public and business complex located in the city of Astana, Kazakhstan. The complex consists of a podium and two towers with office, retail, hotel and residential premises. The 30-story Talan Towers Offices tower has a business center, and the 25-story The Ritz-Carlton Hotel and Apartments. The towers are connected by a shopping gallery. The total area of the structure is around 106,194 m^{2}. It was built by order of the Kazakhstan group of companies 'Verny Capital' and opened in 2017.

In March 2018, the project received the LEED GOLD certificate.

== History ==
Preparations for the construction of the Talan Towers began in 2012. On 18 June 2013, the first stone was laid. The construction took place in two stages: the first was completed in the fall of 2016, and the second in the spring of 2017. On 3 June 2017, the tower of The Ritz-Carlton, Astana was opened. And in September 2017, the opening of the tower of the Talan Towers Offices business center.

On 15 March 2018, Talan Towers received the international LEED certificate in the GOLD category. In September 2019 was presented the Talan Towers Executive Hub office space. Later this month, the 3-stages Talan Gallery opened. It is part of the Talan Towers architectural complex.

On 13 November 2019, Tesla Supercharger charging stations were installed at Talan Towers. These are the first Tesla chargers in the CIS officially presented by the company.

== Architecture and design ==
The coordination of all participants in the construction was carried out by the American company Turner Construction. Talan Towers architectural concept developed by SOM (Skidmore, Owings & Merrill). Renaissance, Metal Yapi, Kone, KUKBO DESIGN, Energoprojekt and Elite Construction were involved in the construction of the buildings. Several companies participated in the development of the design of the complex's facilities: Pringle Brandon Perkins + Will, Callison and Richmond International. In the decoration of Talan Towers 56 types of natural stones were used, imported from quarries of Italy, Spain, Belgium, Germany, China, Turkey and India. Including Jurassic Limestone stones, Sahara Noir marble, Perlato Bianco, Bianco Carrara, Crema Marfi and Calacatta.

== Features ==
The Talan Towers complex consists of two towers and a shopping gallery uniting them. Total area - 106,194 m^{2}.

=== Talan Towers Offices ===
The first Talan Towers Offices tower has a height of 145 m. and 30 floors. The total area of the business center is 31,908.3 m^{2}. Talan Towers Offices introduced green roofing technologies that retain heat, water saving and drip irrigation systems, reuse of rainwater to irrigate green spaces, and installed solar panels. Also, during construction, energy-saving glass was used to optimize the temperature and lighting inside the building.

=== The Ritz-Carlton, Astana ===
The second tower is owned by The Ritz-Carlton, Astana hotel. It owns 17 floors in a 25-story tower and consists of 157 rooms, Mokki and Selfie Astana restaurants, Mokki Cafe, Өzen lobby lounge, The Ritz-Carlton SPA, Astana and conference rooms area of over 1400 m^{2}. The seven upper floors of The Ritz-Carlton, Astana tower are reserved for 27 residences of The Ritz-Carlton Residences, Astana.

=== Parking lot ===
The parking lot in the Talan Towers consists of two levels and is designed for 550 places.
