= Abu Dhabi Plaza =

Building complex in Kazakhstan

- Абу-Даби Плаза

- Location within Kazakhstan

General information
- Status: Completed
- Type: Mixed commercial and residential
- Location: Astana, Kazakhstan
- Coordinates: 51.1221°N 71.4282°E
- Construction started: 2011
- Completed: 2021
- Opening: 2022

Height
- Roof: 310.8 m (1,020 ft)

Technical details
- Floor count: 75
- Floor area: 550,000 m^{2} (5,900,000 sq ft)

Design and construction
- Architects: HKR Architects, Mott MacDonald Ltd (project manager)
- Developer: Aldar
- Structural engineer: Hyder Consulting, Ramboll Consulting, Robert Bird Group
- Services engineer: RED Engineering Design
- Main contractor: Arabtec / CCC

Website
- abudhabiplaza-kz.com

Abu Dhabi Plaza (Kazakh: Абу-Даби Плаза, romanized: Abu-Dabi Plaza) is a mixed-use development complex in the very center of Astana, the capital of Kazakhstan. As of 2022, the tallest tower of Abu Dhabi Plaza at 310.8 metres (1,020 ft) is the tallest building in Kazakhstan and Central Asia.

== Background ==
On 11 June 2009, after two years of completing the design stage, Kazakhstan and the United Arab Emirates signed an agreement on construction of the Abu Dhabi Plaza mixed-use development complex.

== Main facilities of the complex ==
Abu Dhabi Plaza consists of five buildings with an area amounting to more than 500,000 m^{2} (5,400,000 sq ft). The tallest tower, which is 320 metres (1,050 ft), includes 75 floors, which contains offices and residential premises. The complex also includes two office towers with 29 and 31 floors respectively. A 15-storey residential tower is also part of the complex. The fifth building is a 14-floor hotel tower, the Sheraton Astana Hotel. The taller residential tower was completed in 2021.

The shopping center of Abu Dhabi Plaza was inaugurated on 2 December 2019. Its area is 26,000 m^{2} (280,000 sq ft) accommodating shops and restaurants located on two levels.

== Gallery ==
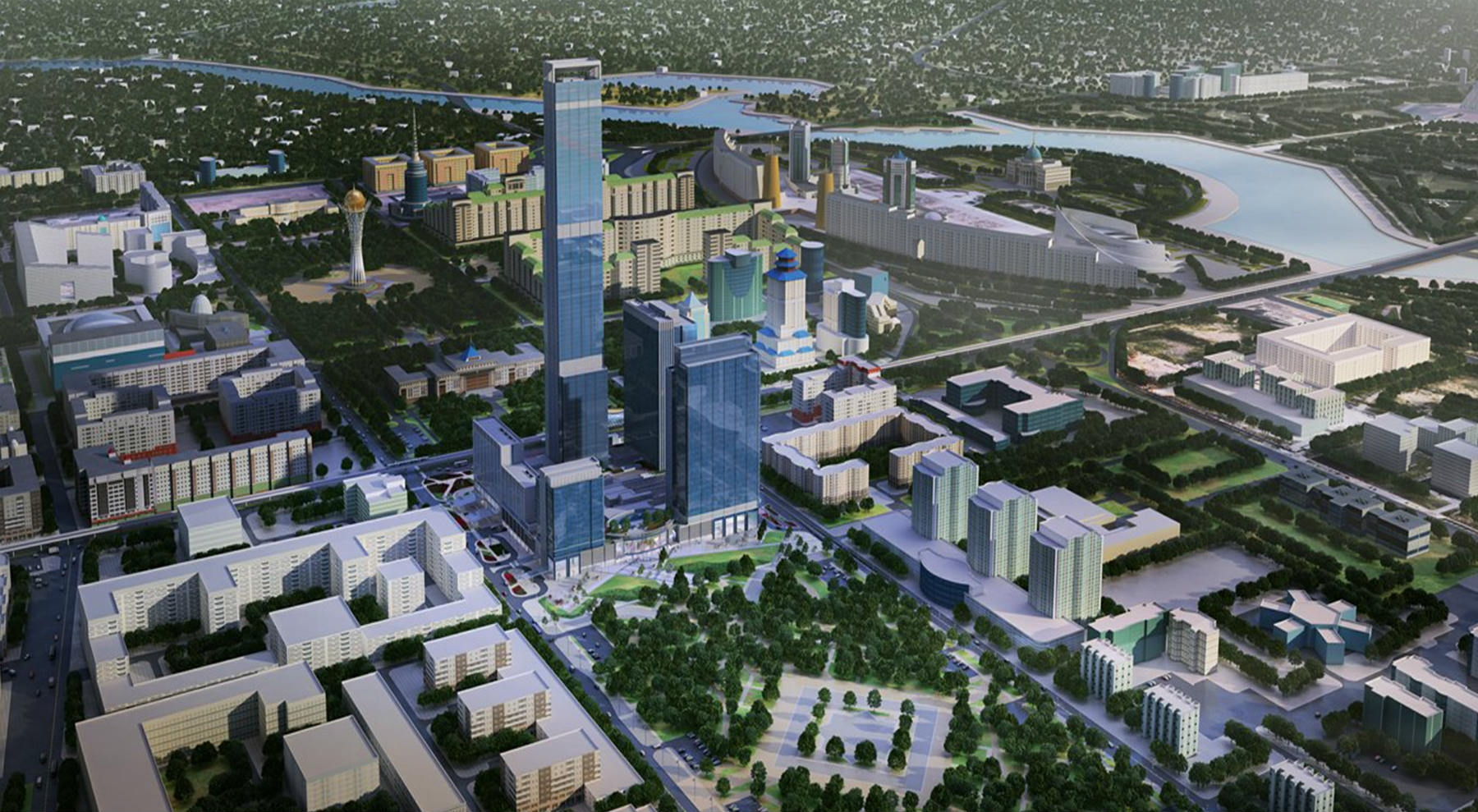
Artists rendition of Abu Dhabi Plaza (c. 2007)

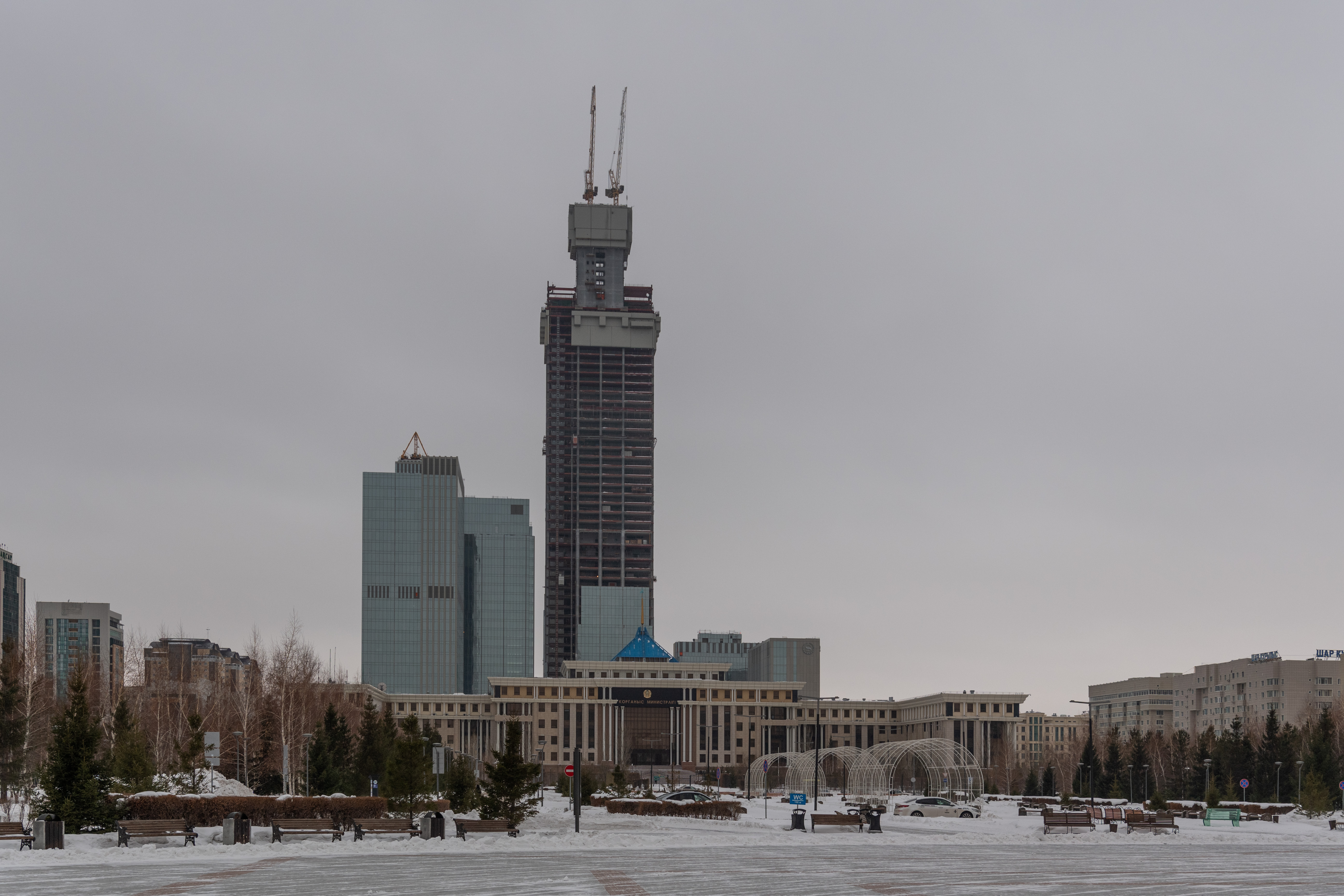
Abu Dhabi Plaza under construction (November 2019)

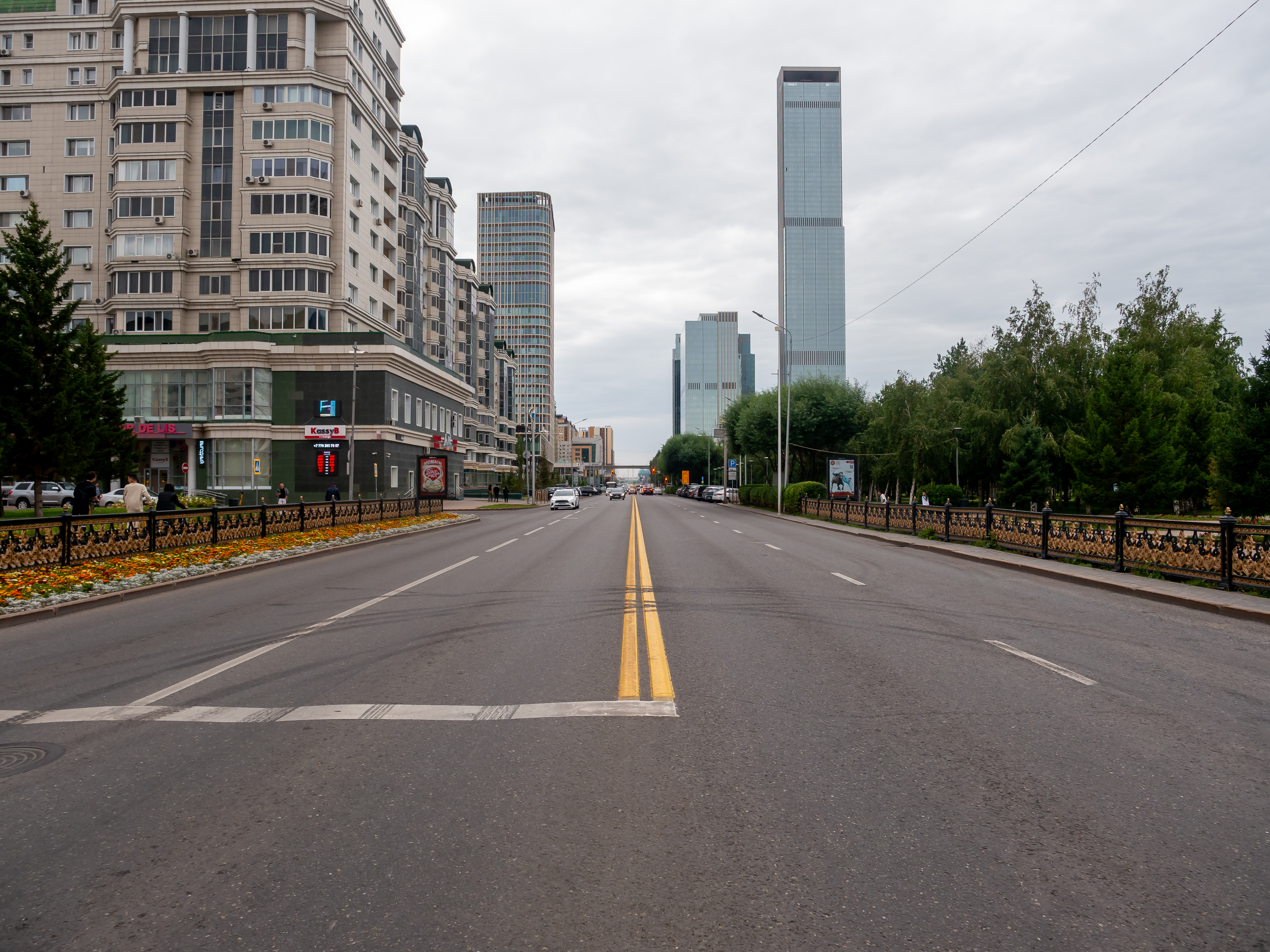
Abu Dhabi Plaza as seen from Turkistan Street

== See also ==
- List of tallest buildings in Astana
- List of tallest buildings in Kazakhstan
- List of tallest residential buildings
