= Igor Nikitin =

Igor Nikitin may refer to:

- Igor Nikitin (weightlifter) (born 1952), Soviet weightlifter
- Igor Nikitin (businessman) (1965–2015), Russian television executive
- Igor Nikitin (ice hockey) (born 1973), Russian ice hockey player and coach
