= Svyatoslav Bunyaev =

Russian businessman (born 1960)

Svyatoslav Ivanovich Bunyaev
- Святослав Иванович Буняев
- Born: August 30, 1960 (age 64); Baku, Azerbaijan
- Occupation: Media Manager

Svyatoslav Ivanovich Bunyaev (born August 30, 1960) is a Russian manager in telecom-media industry. From 2002–2009, he worked as VP of the RTRN (Russian TV-Radio Network). Now he is the founder and CEO of Setevisor.

== Biography ==
Svyatoslav Bunyaev was born in Baku. His parents were immigrants from the Belgorod and Saratov region, USSR.

== Education ==
He graduated from High School No. 200 in Baku. From 1978–1983, he was a student of Bauman Moscow State Technical University and graduated with specialization in robotics and automation systems.

== Early career ==
From 1983 to 1989, he worked as a researcher at MSTU in laser technology and robotics. As a result, there were two patents in testing methods of composite materials by a laser. From 1989 to 1992, he was the a VP of Fort-Info - software development company. In 1991, after acquisition into Slavtech, he took position of Executive Manager of innovation developments.

== United States ==
In 1993, he received an invitation from American company PDA Associates to work in USA.

In the period of 1994 to 1995, he worked on new wireless technologies and then on business development for ethnic markets in Bay Area (Burlingame, California, USA).

In 1996–1998, worked as business development manager of the company Cyperion (Sunnyvale, CA USA). He was in charge of development - Internet Security Access and Voice over IP solutions.

In 1999, he took the position CIO - Head of software development at Edgenet Communication (Burlingame, Silicon Valley, CA USA) and he was in charge for network software solutions development.

== Television ==
Between 2002 and 2009, he worked as VP of the RTRN (Russian TV-Radio Network). He was responsible for business development and implementation of new technologies and also for management of broadcasting network in Russia.

In 2010, Bunyaev launched a Setevisor as a development company that enable broadcasters and content providers to distribute and manage their video content to media market.

In 2011, Bunyaev launched the first interactive TV channel in Russia - OnlineTV.ru.
