= Seventh Heaven (restaurant) =

Revolving restaurant in Moscow TV tower

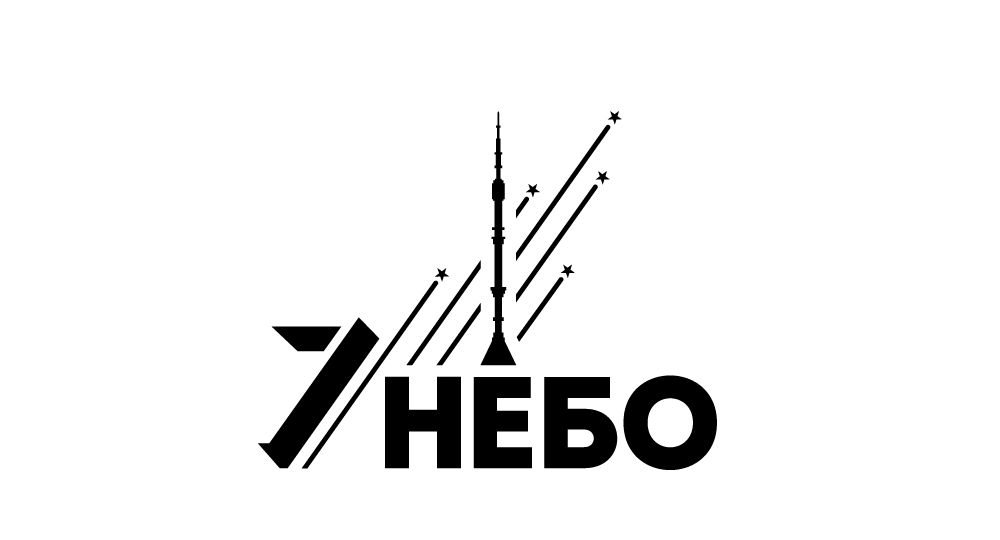

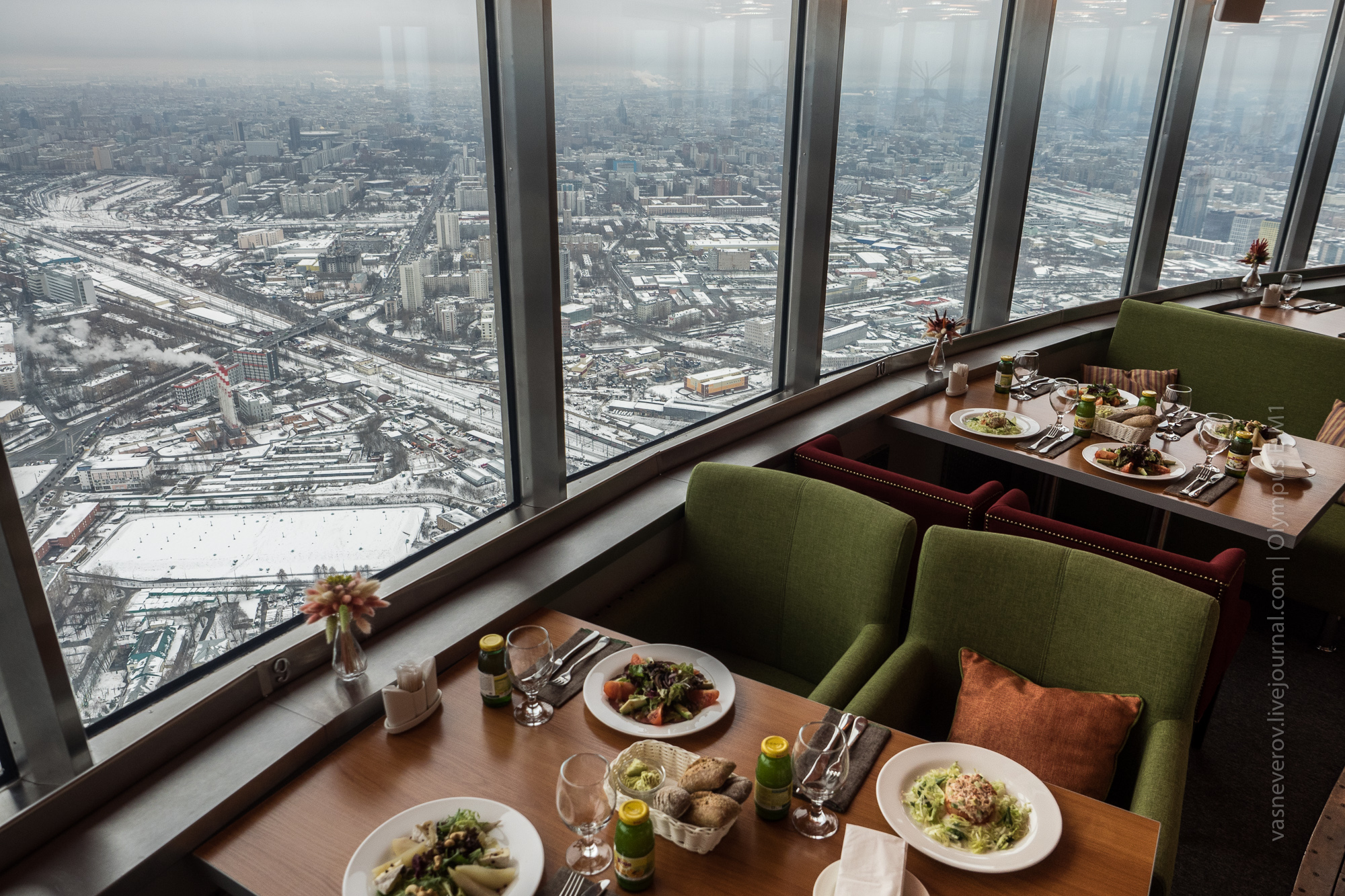
- Interior of the restaurant
- Interactive map of Seventh Heaven

Restaurant information
- Established: 1967
- Location: ul Koroleva, 15, Moscow, 127000, Russia
- Coordinates: 55°49′11″N 37°36′42″E
- Seating capacity: 3 x 80
- Reservations: required

Seventh Heaven (Russian: «Седьмое небо», romanized: Sedmoe nebo) is a three-level revolving restaurant in the Ostankino TV Tower in Moscow, Russia.

The restaurant consists of three halls: "Bronze", "Silver" and "Gold", occupying three separate floors at altitudes of 328–334 m (1,076–1,096 ft) above the ground. The total area of the halls is 600 m^{2} (6,500 sq ft); the width of each of the three halls is 2.5 metres (8 ft 2 in). The maximum capacity of each level is up to 80 people. Reservations are required.

== Restaurant complex at present ==
In 2016, two floors of the restaurant complex ― a coffee shop and a cafe ― resumed their work. In 2017, the restaurant hall opened, but in 2020 it was closed again due to coronavirus restrictions.

The Seventh Heaven restaurant complex currently consists of three levels: a coffee shop (mark 334 meters), a cafe (mark 331 meters) and a restaurant (mark 328 meters).

The coffee shop is the most democratic area of the complex. Here, every day from 10:30 AM, there are snacks with pastries, desserts, croissants, pies, drink tea or coffee, alcoholic cocktails, wine, beer, cider. There are 70 seats in the coffee shop, no reservation is required. The main feature of the coffee shop is a circular bar along the windows, which offer views from a height of 334 meters above the ground.

A cafe serving snacks, salads, soups, hot dishes, desserts, ice cream starts working from Thursday to Sunday from 11:00. Drinks include wine, aperitifs and digestives, a selection of spirits, juices, lemonades, tea, coffee. There are 62 seats in the cafe, no reservation is required.

The restaurant operates according to the Rules of visiting the Ostankino Tower. It has 48 seats.

== Links ==
- Restaurant page and reservations
