= Novorossiysk TV Tower =

Tower in Krasnodar Krai, Russia

Coordinates: 44°48′57″N 37°39′30″E

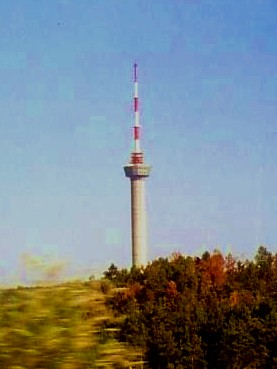
Novorossiysk TV Tower

Novorossiysk TV Tower is a Russian transmission tower that is made of steel and reinforced concrete. The tower is used for FM and TV transmission at Novorossiysk in Russia. It was completed in 1996 and is owned by the Russian Television and Radio Broadcasting Network. It has an antenna that contributes to its stature which is 261 metres long.

== Geography ==
The Novorossiysk TV Tower can be found in the city of Novorossiysk, which is located in the krai (federal subject) of Krasnodar, which in turn, is located in the Southern Federal District, in Russia.

== See also ==
- List of towers
