= Ostankino Tower =

Radio and television tower in Moscow

- Останкинская телебашня
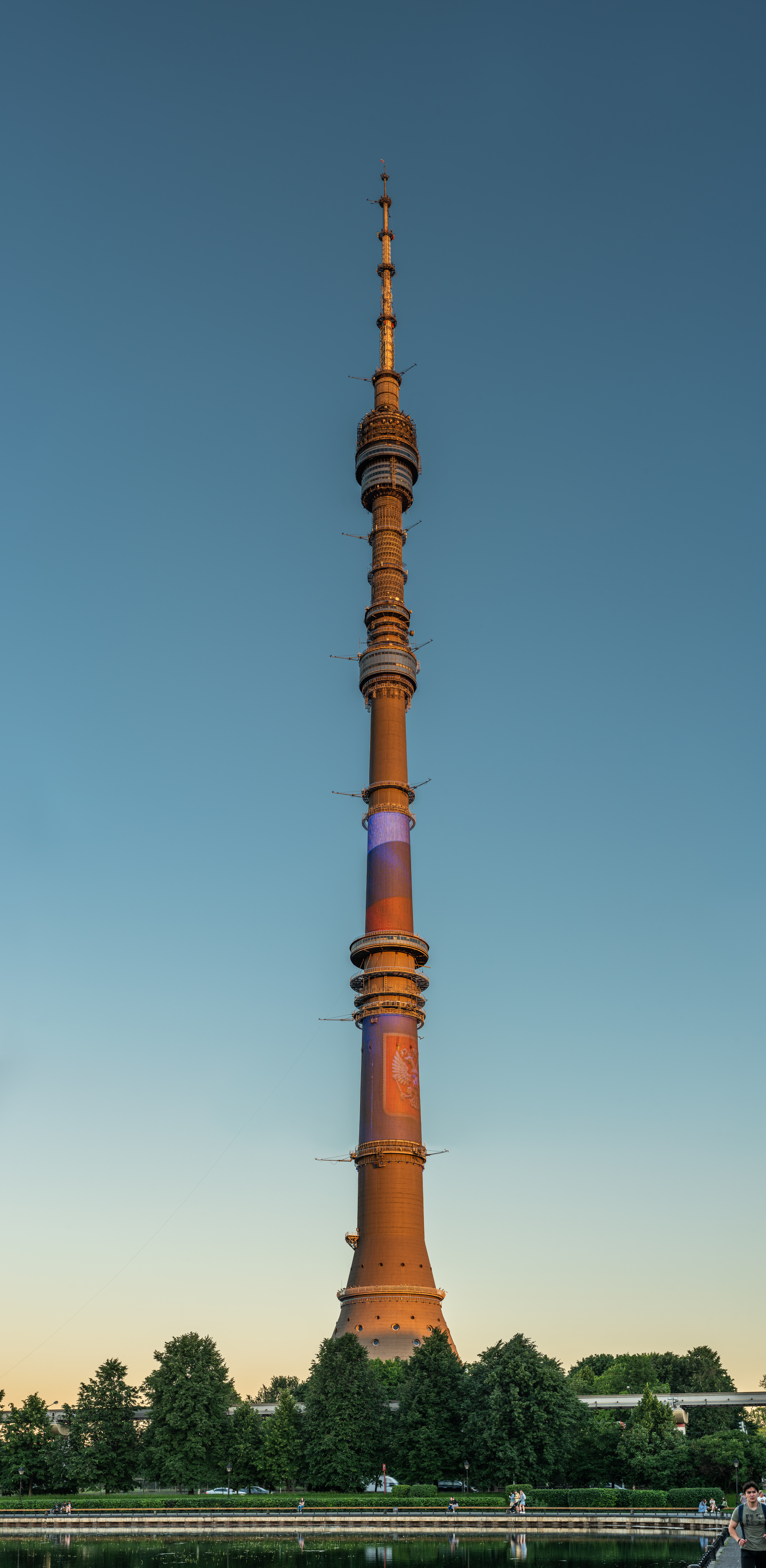
- The Ostankino Tower in June 2021
- Location in Moscow

Record height
- Tallest in the world from 1967 to 1975^{[I]}
- Preceded by: Empire State Building
- Surpassed by: CN Tower

General information
- Status: Completed
- Type: Observation, telecommunications, tourism
- Location: Moscow, Russia
- Coordinates: 55°49′11″N 37°36′42″E
- Construction started: 1963
- Completed: 1967
- Owner: Unitary enterprise Russian Television and Radio Broadcasting Network

Height
- Antenna spire: 540.1 m (1,772.0 ft)
- Roof: 385.4 m (1,264.4 ft)
- Top floor: 360.4 m (1,182.4 ft)

Technical details
- Floor count: 120 (equivalent)
- Floor area: 15,000 m^{2} (160,000 ft^{2})
- Lifts/elevators: 11

Design and construction
- Structural engineer: Nikolai Nikitin

The Ostankino Tower (Russian: Останкинская телебашня, romanized: Ostankinskaya telebashnya) is a television and radio tower in Moscow, Russia, owned by the Moscow branch of unitary enterprise Russian TV and Radio Broadcasting Network. Standing 540.1 metres (1,772 ft), it was designed by Nikolai Nikitin. As of 2026, it is the tallest free-standing structure in Europe and 15th tallest in the world. Between 1967 and 1974, it was the tallest in the world. The tower was the first free-standing structure to exceed 500 m (1,600 ft) in height. Ostankino was built to mark the 50th anniversary of the October Revolution. It is named after the surrounding Ostankino district of Moscow.

Upon the completion of construction, approximately 10 million individuals resided within the transmitter coverage area, which expanded to over 15 million by 2014. This area encompasses Moscow and the Moscow Region, as well as certain portions of the Vladimir and Kaluga regions. The ownership of the TV tower lies with the Moscow Regional Center, a division of the Russian Television and Radio Broadcasting Network (RTRN).

Under favorable weather conditions, the Ostankino TV Tower can be seen by residents of certain cities in the Moscow Region, including Balashikha, Voskresensk, Zelenograd, Korolev, Krasnogorsk, Lyubertsy, Mytishchi, Odintsovo, Podolsk, Khimki, and Shchyolkovo.

== History ==
=== Choosing a site for construction ===
The primary function of the Ostankino TV Tower is to transmit TV signals. Prior to its establishment, this task was fulfilled by a structure devised by Vladimir Shukhov in 1922. During that era, the "wicker" tower located on Shabolovka Street was widely regarded as an extraordinary feat of engineering ingenuity. However, it became apparent in the 1950s that the tower had reached the end of its lifespan. Originally designed primarily for radio signal transmission, the tower found itself adapting to the emergence of television broadcasting in the late 1930s.

=== Initial design ===
The project was initially assigned to the Kyiv Design Institute specializing in steel structures, which won the All-Union competition for the best TV tower design. Their proposal was an openwork metal tower similar to the Eiffel Tower in Paris or the Shukhov Tower in Moscow. However, the architects tasked with realizing the project were not very enthusiastic about it. Numerous engineers, including Nikolai Nikitin, a member of the competition committee and an expert in reinforced concrete and metal structures, came up with an alternative idea. Nikitin expressed a strong dislike towards his colleagues' project, deeming the design unappealing. He suggested building the tower out of reinforced concrete, citing a successful similar project in Stuttgart that had been completed two years prior, in 1956. He firmly believed that such a type of structure would be much more aesthetically pleasing. Nikitin's proposal was taken seriously, and he was given the opportunity to prepare his own application. To ensure the strength and stability of the concrete frame, Nikitin incorporated 149 taut steel ropes. Nikitin later asserted that he had conceived the project overnight, and the prototype for the cone-shaped foundation of the tower was inspired by the upside-down lilium flower, known for its robust petals and sturdy stem, which the engineer had envisioned in his dream just days before the deadline for submitting sketches. However, it is possible that the reality was different. His design was inspired by the work of scientist Yuri Kondratyuk in the 1930s, who had envisioned a thin and hollow concrete structure for a wind farm on Mount Ai-Petri in the Crimea. Kondratyuk successfully designed a 165 m (541 ft) structure and took precautions by reinforcing it with steel cables to ensure its stability against strong winds. The project was left incomplete due to several factors, but the concept remained in Nikitin's mind. In 1932, architect Pier Luigi Nervi presented a project called the "Monument of the Banner" in Rome for a competition. It is uncertain whether Nikolai Nikitin was acquainted with these sketches, but the base of the structure bears a striking resemblance to the Ostankino TV tower. Later, after the completion of the Ostankino tower, the initial lattice metal design was realized as the Kyiv TV Tower, albeit shortened by almost 30% so as not to be as tall as the Ostankino tower.

Nikolai Nikitin suggested constructing a 540 metres (1,770 ft) rocket, but the proposed tower had minimal foundation, with only a 4.6-meter base underground. Many of Nikitin's colleagues expressed concerns about the stability of the structure and recommended reinforcing it with 40-meter piles. They even wrote collective letters to halt construction. However, despite their efforts, the project was ultimately completed and the tower remained stable. This was primarily due to the shifted center of gravity. The center of gravity can be compared to a roly-poly toy, which means that the structure can sway in strong winds. The maximum deflection of the spire throughout the construction process was approximately 12 metres (39 ft). Certainly, in addition to the shifted center of gravity, there was a need for further structural reinforcement. As a result, a total of 150 steel cables were carefully installed inside. In order to safeguard against any potential corrosion of the iron over time, the cables were coated with a substance known as gun oil. This particular type of petroleum oil is made thicker by combining it with petrolatum and ceresin.

=== Construction ===
The construction work commenced in 1959, leading to the establishment of an entire town dedicated to the project. This town included essential facilities such as a boiler house, a concrete plant, and a mechanical workshop. The tower trunk was successfully erected using a self-lifting crane, while alternative methods, specifically the utilization of helicopters, were employed to install the antenna atop the TV tower.

Leonid Batalov and Dmitry Burdin were responsible for shaping the structure's appearance. They incorporated arches between the supports, constructed a glazed cylinder beneath the tower trunk to accommodate technical services and live broadcasting studios, and integrated illuminator windows in the upper section of the cone, giving the tower a striking similarity to a rocket. Furthermore, at the height of 325–360 m (1,066–1,181 ft), the tower was extended with a structure resembling a 10-storey house, featuring essential equipment, a revolving restaurant spanning three floors, and an observation deck inspired by the design of the TV tower in Stuttgart. Moreover, the balconies and trunk of the tower efficiently housed equipment for radio relay lines, mobile television stations, radiotelephone communications, special services facilities, and a meteorological complex.

The grand opening of the Ostankino TV Tower occurred in 1967, coinciding with the 50th anniversary of the October Revolution. However, initially only a portion of the structure was operational. The remaining works were completed by 1969, allowing for the opening of observation platforms and a restaurant for visitors. The tower has two observation decks: one is a glazed deck situated at a height of 337 m (1,106 ft), while the second is an open deck positioned approx. 3 metres (9.8 ft) closer to the top of the tower. Although it is referred to as "open", there are bars in place for safety reasons. Additionally, it is only open on rare occasions, specifically during favorable weather conditions without wind.

Comparison of the Ostankino Tower with the world's seven tallest towers

Prior to 1976, the Ostankino TV Tower held the prestigious title of being the tallest structure in the entire world, standing at a height of 540 meters, thereby surpassing New York City's Empire State Building to become the tallest free-standing structure in the world. However, this achievement was subsequently overtaken by the CN Tower in Toronto, Canada. Towering above the ground at a height of 553 metres (1,814 ft), the CN Tower claimed the new record.

=== Vantage point ===
Over the course of 30 years leading up to the 2000 fire, the vantage point and the "Seventh Heaven" restaurant welcomed over 10 million guests. Following the fire, both the platform and the restaurant underwent reconstruction, with the observation deck being fully renovated by January 2008. Although the observation deck resumed operations with pilot tours on 27 March 2008, the restaurant remained closed as it continued its reconstruction efforts.

On 21 July 2018, there was a race up the tower, featuring athletes from 12 countries. They ran up the narrow, spiral staircase and reached the location at an altitude of 337 metres (1,106 ft). The fastest of the 28 athletes was the German Christian Riedl, who made it to the top in 9 minutes and 51 seconds. The women's winner was Cynthia Harris (US), who reached the top in 12 minutes and 15 seconds.

== Accidents ==
=== Fire of 2000 ===
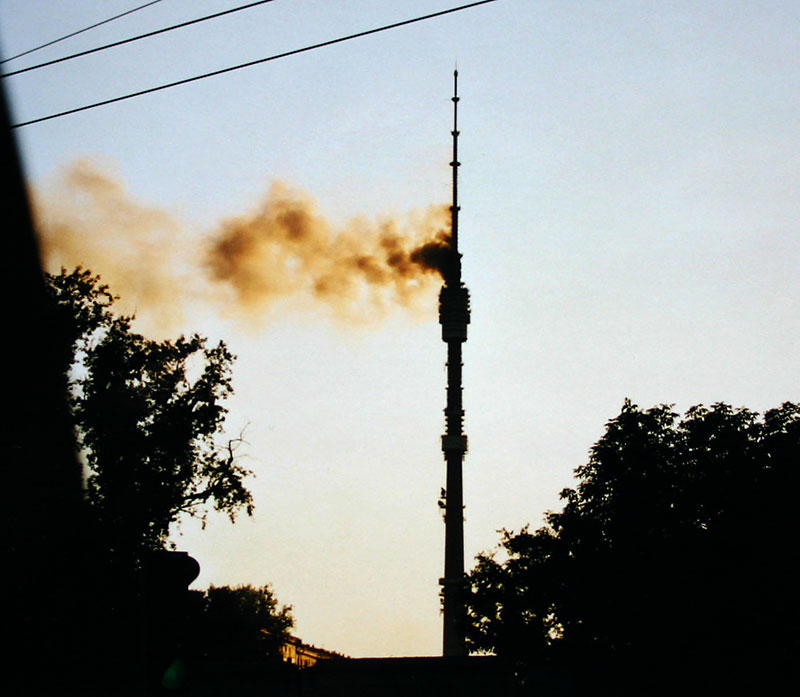
The tower on fire on 27 August 2000

On 27 August 2000, a devastating blaze not only engulfed the Seventh Heaven restaurant but also caused extensive damage to the entire structure. Out of the 150 steel cables that once held the building together, only 19 remained intact after the fire had subsided. The fire initially broke out at a height of 460 metres (1,510 ft), which is approx. 98 metres (322 ft) above the observation platform and the Seventh Heaven, around 3 o'clock in the afternoon. Within moments, the flames had rapidly spread, engulfing nearby structures. It took the efforts of firefighters and emergency personnel until the following evening to extinguish the flames. The aftermath of the fire had far-reaching consequences, as the entire city of Moscow was left without television reception, with additional disruption to radio signals. While some channels were able to quickly restore their services, it took several months to completely repair and reinstate the signals citywide.

There were three fatalities as a result of the fire. A firefighter and lift operator died when their elevator cabin crashed to the ground level due to the fire.

The fire necessitated the evacuation of all visitors and staff from those locations, carried out within 90 minutes from the onset of the fire. The substantial loss incurred was primarily attributed to the outdated and inadequately maintained electronic equipment, a significant portion of which had been installed during the 1960s. Furthermore, the tower had become increasingly crowded with equipment.

The failure of the fire suppression systems meant that firefighters and emergency workers had to manually carry heavy equipment, including chemical fire extinguishers, up the tower to stop the fire. Temporary firewalls made of asbestos were installed at a height of 70 metres (230 ft) to prevent further spreading. As a result of the fire, television broadcasts in Moscow and the surrounding areas were mostly disrupted, except for the privately owned NTV station. However, the government prioritized state channels and therefore the RTR TV channel began transmitting to several districts in Moscow. The fire caused the upper spire of the tower to tilt slightly, which caused concerns that the tower might collapse. However, upon further inspection, it was determined that although the structure suffered significant damage, there was no immediate risk of collapse. Immediate efforts were initiated to rebuild the tower, which turned out to be a lengthy and costly endeavor.

The fire was the third disaster in Russia in a month, following an explosion in Moscow's Pushkinskaya Metro Station (which killed 13 people and injured 150), and the sinking of the submarine Kursk in the Barents Sea, in which 118 died. Russian President Vladimir Putin stated that "This latest accident shows the shape of our vital installations and the overall state of our country. We should not fail to see major problems in the country behind this accident, and we should not forget the economy. Whether or not such accidents happen again in the future will depend on how we work in this vital direction."

On 25 March 2005, the first new elevators since the August 2000 fire, made by the German company ThyssenKrupp, were tested and put into service. The new elevators travel at a speed of 6 metres per second (20 ft/s)

The tower remained inaccessible to visitors until its reconstruction was fully completed in 2008, marking the reopening of the structure's observation decks. However, the restoration efforts did not extend to the tower's restaurant, which remained closed for an additional eight years. The current restaurant within the tower's premises bears little resemblance to its Soviet-era counterpart or the establishment that existed prior to the fire. This transformation is evident not only in the culinary offerings but also in the interior décor, showcasing a complete overhaul of the dining experience, of the Seventh Heaven restaurant which was reopened in November 2016.

=== 2004 base jumping accident ===
On 1 July 2004, Austrian BASE jumper Christina Grubelnik collided with the tower, resulting in a concussion and causing her to lose consciousness. Her parachute became caught on a service platform located at a lower level. Russian emergency services responded quickly.

=== Fire of 2007 ===
In 2006, representatives of the Ministry of Emergency Situations assured that a significant fire incident at the Ostankino Tower would no longer occur as there were no combustible materials remaining within the structure. Following the necessary repairs, the tower has been compartmentalized into multiple sections. In case of a fire in any of these sections, access will be promptly restricted from both sides. Moreover, special installations have been installed to introduce nitrogen into the rooms of the tower during a fire, effectively preventing the development of combustion.

However, in May 2007, smoke was noticed at a height of 342 metres (1,122 ft). As a result of the emergency situation, the elevators were temporarily out of service. Consequently, firefighters had to reach the location of the smoke on foot. The fire was classified as a second (heightened) level of complexity. As per the statement from the Emergencies Ministry, the cause of the fire at the tower was attributed to a breach of fire safety regulations during welding operations. All people inside the tower were evacuated and the fire was successfully extinguished, with no casualties.

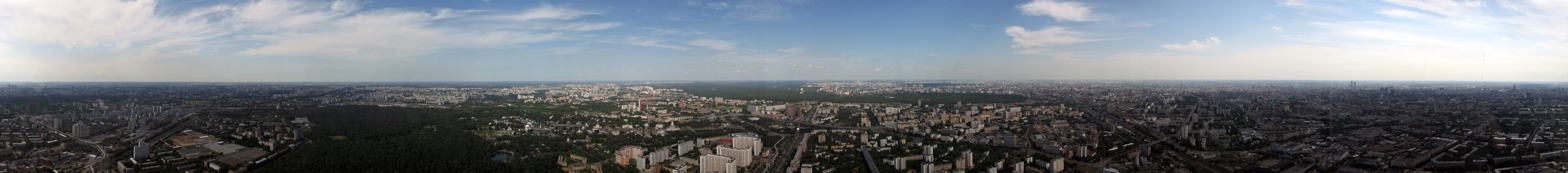
360° panorama from observation deck of the Ostankino TV tower

=== Elevator system ===
Originally, German elevators by R. Stahl were installed in the Ostankino TV Tower. During the fire in 2000, the high temperatures resulted in the severe damage of almost all elevator cables, leading to their collapse. There were three individuals present in one of the cabins during the incident, and none of them survived.

ThyssenKrupp manufactured four new elevators in 2003, but their installation was not completed until 21 November 2005. High-speed elevator No. 4 was put into operation in December 2006. Additionally, a service elevator from the Shcherbinsky plant was also installed in the building. As of September 2017, elevators #6 and #7, which are located above the observation deck and go up to approx. 450 metres (1,480 ft), are not functioning. It is unlikely that they will be restored due to the elevator shafts being blocked with cables and feeders. The remaining five elevators, consisting of four high-speed elevators from ThyssenKrupp and one service elevator from Shcherbinsky elevator plant, are in operation.

The machine units of the high-speed elevators are installed at distances of 360 and 364 meters. These elevators have a feature where their speed can be automatically reduced when signals from sensors detect any tower sway. Additionally, the elevators are equipped with a unique system that enables contactless transmission of electricity to the cabin. This is achieved through inductive energy transfer using a transformer principle. To make this possible, inductive energy transfer elements are positioned in the shaft and current collectors are attached to the car. The CPS inductive power transmission system was provided by the German company Paul Vahle GmbH & Co. KG.

=== Restaurant ===
Within the tower, there is a restaurant called "Seventh Sky" that offers a unique dining experience. The restaurant was visited by the USSR leaders Nikita Podgorny, Alexei Kosygin and Leonid Brezhnev on 7 November 1967.

The restaurant was made up of three halls named "Bronze", "Silver", and "Golden". The halls were located on separate floors at heights ranging from 328 to 334 meters above the ground. Each hall had 24 four-seat tables arranged in a circle near the panoramic windows, with a radius of 9.2 m (30 ft). The total area of the halls was 600 m^{2} (6,500 sq ft), and each hall was 2.5 metres (8 ft 2 in) wide. Due to limited capacity, reservations were necessary in advance, with each level accommodating a maximum of 80 people. Since its opening in 1967, it has been considered the highest establishment for dining in the Soviet Union and was also one of the most expensive. In 1987, the cheapest hall ("Bronze") charged 7 rubles for a day visit, and there was no choice of dishes. The restaurant was a popular tourist attraction in Moscow because its circular rooms rotated once every forty minutes. Throughout its operation, approximately 10 million people visited.

The restaurant operated without interruption for 33 years, until a fire occurred on 27 August 2000. This incident resulted in the destruction of all three floors, thus necessitating sixteen years for the reconstruction to be completed.

The fire of 2000 caused extensive damage to the interiors of "Seventh Sky" and its reconstruction was significantly delayed for a period of 16 years. Initially, the project faced challenges in securing an investor, and subsequently, the implementation of safety regulations by the Russian Ministry of Emergency Situations posed an obstacle as it limited the number of visitors to a maximum of 50 in the tower at any time.

From 28 August 2000 to April 2012, various measures were taken to enhance fire safety in the restaurant halls. These included the installation of new water fire extinguishing systems, treatment of all metal structures with fireproofing compounds, replacement of exterior cladding and old double-glazed windows with newer ones. Additionally, significant renovations were done on the ventilation system, air conditioning, water supply, and other related aspects in the restaurant.

In 2016, the coffee shop and café levels of the complex reopened. The restaurant hall was also launched in 2017, and had to be temporarily closed in 2020 due to the ongoing coronavirus restrictions. The Seventh Heaven restaurant complex comprises three levels: coffee shop (at 334 metres (1,096 ft)), the cafe (at 331 metres (1,086 ft)), and the restaurant (at 328 metres (1,076 ft)).

=== Flagpole ===
The Ostankino Tower held the title of the tallest flagpole in the world for a long time. On 27 April 1967, the flag of the USSR was placed on top of the tower and was regularly replaced twice a year, for May Day and 7 November 1967. Originally, the flag was intended to be 50 by 20 metres (164 ft × 66 ft), but it was reduced to 5 by 2 metres (16.4 ft × 6.6 ft) due to concerns about wind load.

In 1991, the flag was taken down and the tower remained without it for over 17 years. On 12 June 2009, which is the Day of Russia, the flag of Russia was hoisted on the tower. The flag specifically made for the tower was sewn in Vladimir using a reinforced fabric. The previous flag of the USSR, which was lowered in December 1991, is currently preserved in the tower museum.

== Channels listed by frequency ==
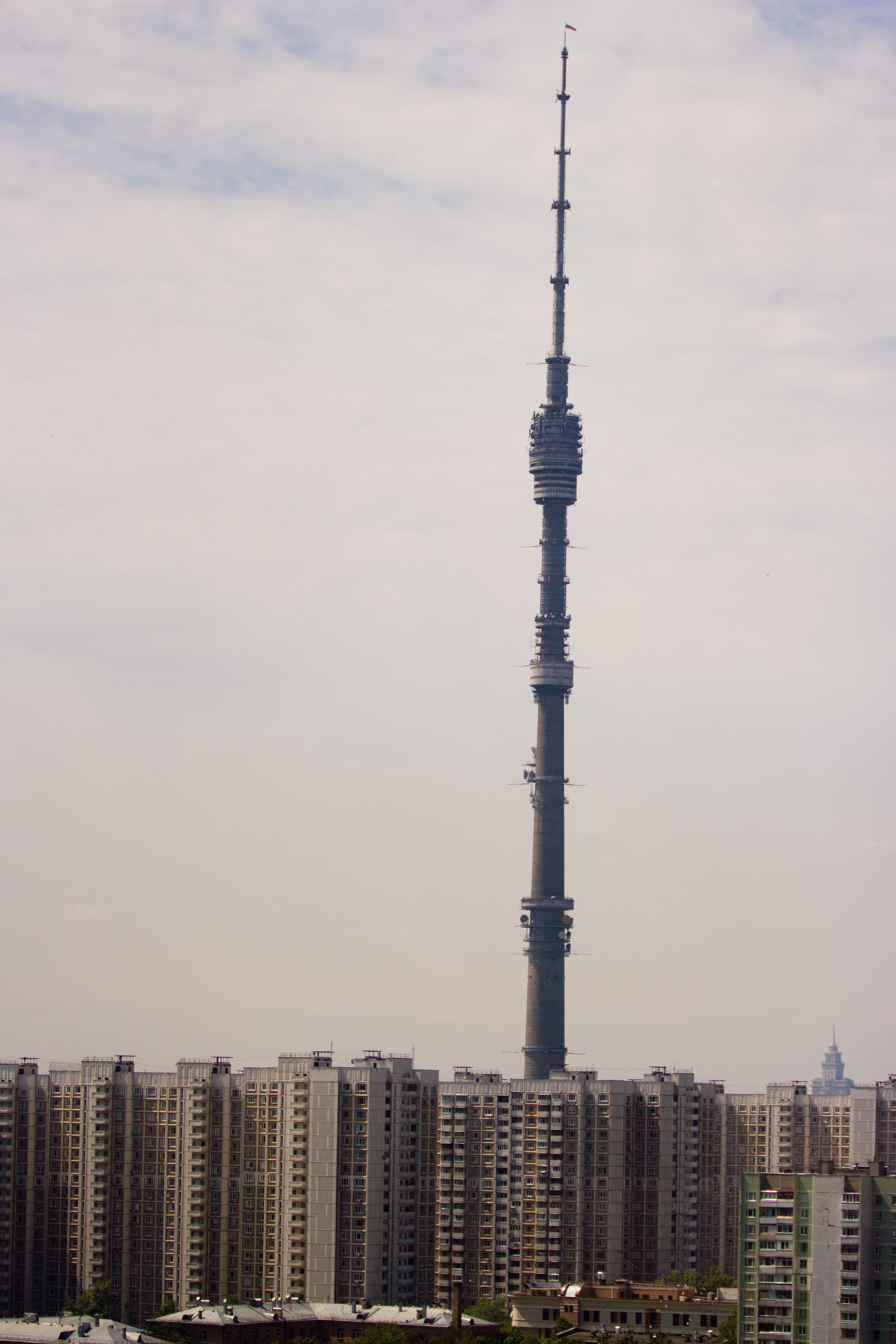
The tower compared to high-rise apartments

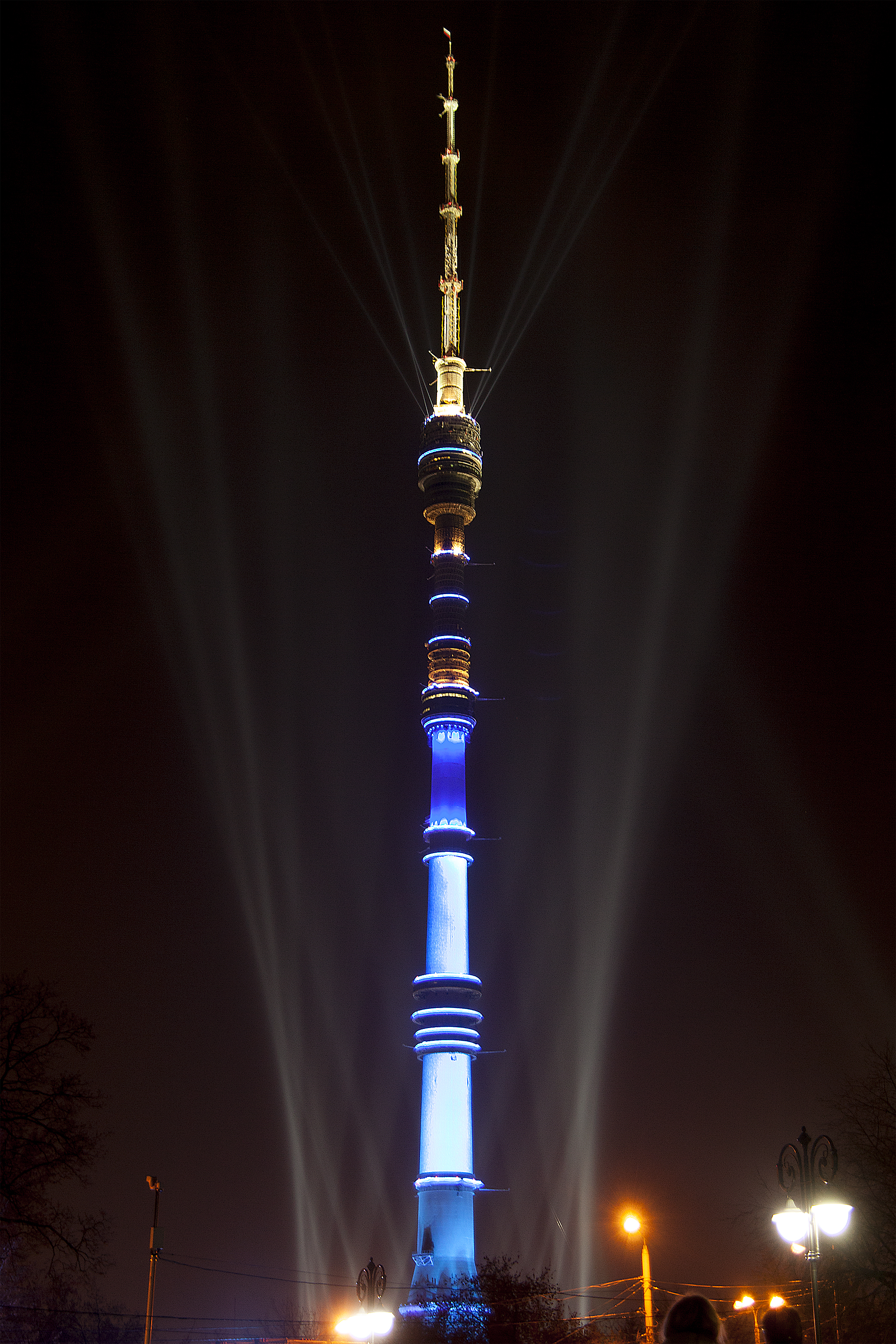
Ostankino Tower at night

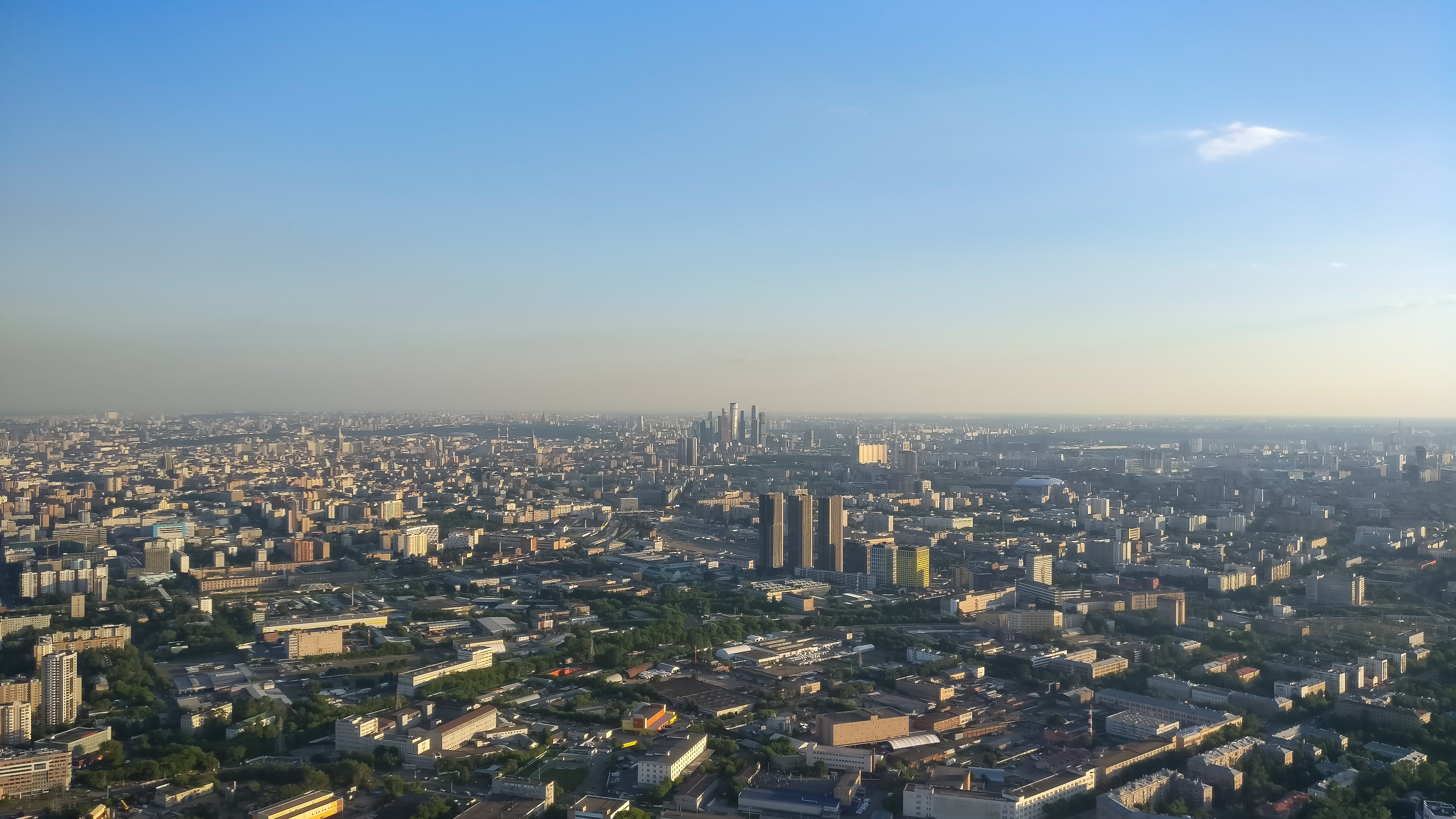
View from Ostankino Tower towards Moscow City

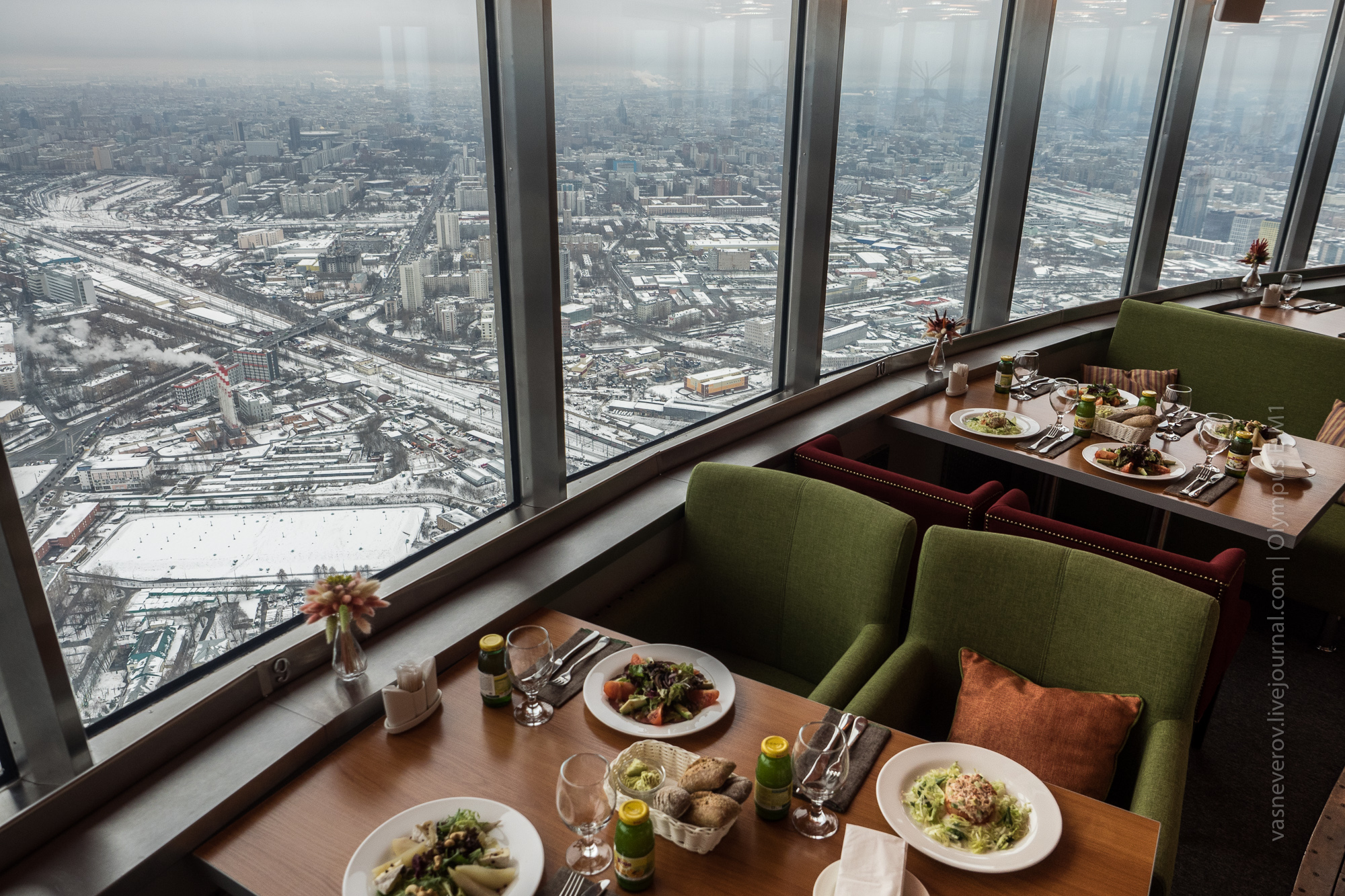
"Sed'moe Nebo" restaurant with winter view

=== Analogue radio (FM) ===
Station	Frequency	ERP
"Business FM"	87.50 MHz	5.0 kW
"Retro FM"	88.30 MHz	5.0 kW
"Radio Jazz"	89.10 MHz	5.0 kW
"Radio Sputnik"	91.20 MHz	5.0 kW
"Culture"	91.60 MHz	5.0 kW
"Kommersant FM"	93.60 MHz	5.0 kW
"Moscow speaking"	94.80 MHz	5.0 kW
"Rock FM"	95.20 MHz	5.0 kW
"Radio Star"	95.60 MHz	5.0 kW
"Dorozhnoe Radio"	96.00 MHz	10.0 kW
"Vesti FM"	97.60 MHz	5.0 kW
"Radio Chocolate"	98.00 MHz	5.0 kW
"New Radio"	98.40 MHz	5.0 kW
"Orpheus"	99.20 MHz	5.0 kW
"Silver Rain"	100.10 MHz	5.0 kW
"Radio Vera"	100.90 MHz	5.0 kW
"Dance FM"	101.20 MHz	10.0 kW
"Radio of Russia"	101.50 MHz	5.0 kW
"Nashe Radio"	101.80 MHz	5.0 kW
"Monte Carlo"	102.10 MHz	5.0 kW
"Radio Mayak"	103.40 MHz	5.0 kW
"Radio Maximum"	103.70 MHz	10.0 kW
"Radio 7"	104.70 MHz	5.0 kW
"Radio Gordost"	105.00 MHz	5.0 kW
"Radio of Moscow"	105.30 MHz	5.0 kW
"Europa Plus"	106.20 MHz	10.0 kW

=== Digital television (DVB-T2) ===
Station	Channel	Frequency	ERP
Second multiplex: (REN-TV, Spas, STS, Domashniy, TV-3, Sport Plus, Zvezda, Mir, TNT, Muz-TV)	24		10 kW
First multiplex: (Channel One, Russia 1, Match TV, Russia K, Russia 24, Karusel, NTV, Channel 5, OTR, TV Center)	30		10 kW
ООО «Цифровое ТРВ» (encoded): (DVisionLive, DVisionNews, DVisionSpice, TV1000)	32		1 kW
Third multiplex (special for Moscow and Moscow region): Lifenews (24 hours), Sport 1 (24 hours), Nash Futbol (encoded), Doverie (0:00–12:00)/Euronews (12:00–0:00), Sport (00:00–06:00)/Boytsovskiy Klub (06:00–12:00)/Moya Planeta (12:00–18:00)/Nauka 2.0 (18:00–00:00), Russkiy Roman (00:00–05:00)/Russkiy Bestseller (05:00–10:00)/Russkiy Detective (10:00–15:00)/Istoriya (15:00–20:00)/Mult (20:00–00:00), Sarafan (00:00–12:00)/Strana (12:00–00:00), Zhivaya Planeta (00:00–06:00)/IQ HD (06:00–09:00)/24 Doc (09:00–12:00)/Techno 24 (12:00–15:00)/Mama (15:00–18:00)/NST (18:00–21:00)/Park Razvlecheniy (21:00–00:00), Dom Kino (01:30–02:30)/Vremya (02:30–04:30)/Telecafe (04:30–06:30)/Muzyka Pervogo (06:30–01:30), 365 dney TV (00:00–02:00)/TNT-Comedy (02:00–04:00)/ Mnogo TV (04:00–06:00)/HD Life (06:00–08:00)/STV (08:00–10:00)/India TV (10:00–12:00)/Boets (12:00–14:00)/Comedia TV (14:00–16:00)/La Minor(16:00–18:00)/Interesnoe TV (18:00–20:00)/Kukhnya TV (20:00–22:00)/Auto Plus (22:00–00:00)	34		10 kW

=== Analogue television ===
In Moscow and the Moscow Region, along with 18 other regions, analogue television closed on 15 April 2019, at 12:00 (UTC+3).

Station	Channel	Frequency	ERP
Channel One	1	MHz	40 kW
Russia-1	2	MHz	40 kW
TV Tsentr	3	MHz	40 kW
NTV	4	MHz	1 kW
Match TV	6	MHz	1 kW
NTV	8	MHz	40 kW
REN TV	9	MHz	40 kW
Moscow 24	10	MHz	40 kW
Russia 1	11	MHz	60 kW
Che	23	MHz	10 kW
360*Super	25	MHz	105 kW
STS-Moscow	27	MHz	5 kW
Disney Channel (Russia)	29	MHz	10 kW
Domashniy	31	MHz	20 kW
Russia K	33	MHz	20 kW
TNT	35	MHz	5 kW
Channel Five	44	MHz	5 kW
TV-3	46	MHz	10 kW
REN TV	49	MHz	20 kW
U	51	MHz	20 kW
Zvezda	57	MHz	5 kW
2×2	60	MHz	5 kW

== See also ==
- Ostankino Technical Center
- List of tallest buildings and structures in the world
- List of tallest structures in the former Soviet Union
- List of towers
- Fernsehturm Stuttgart – first TV tower built from concrete and prototype for many similar towers built later

Records
Preceded by Empire State Building	World's tallest free-standing structure 1967–1975	Succeeded by CN Tower
Preceded by Tokyo Tower	World's tallest free-standing tower 1967–1975	Succeeded by CN Tower
