= Igor Nikitin (businessman) =

- Игорь Никитин
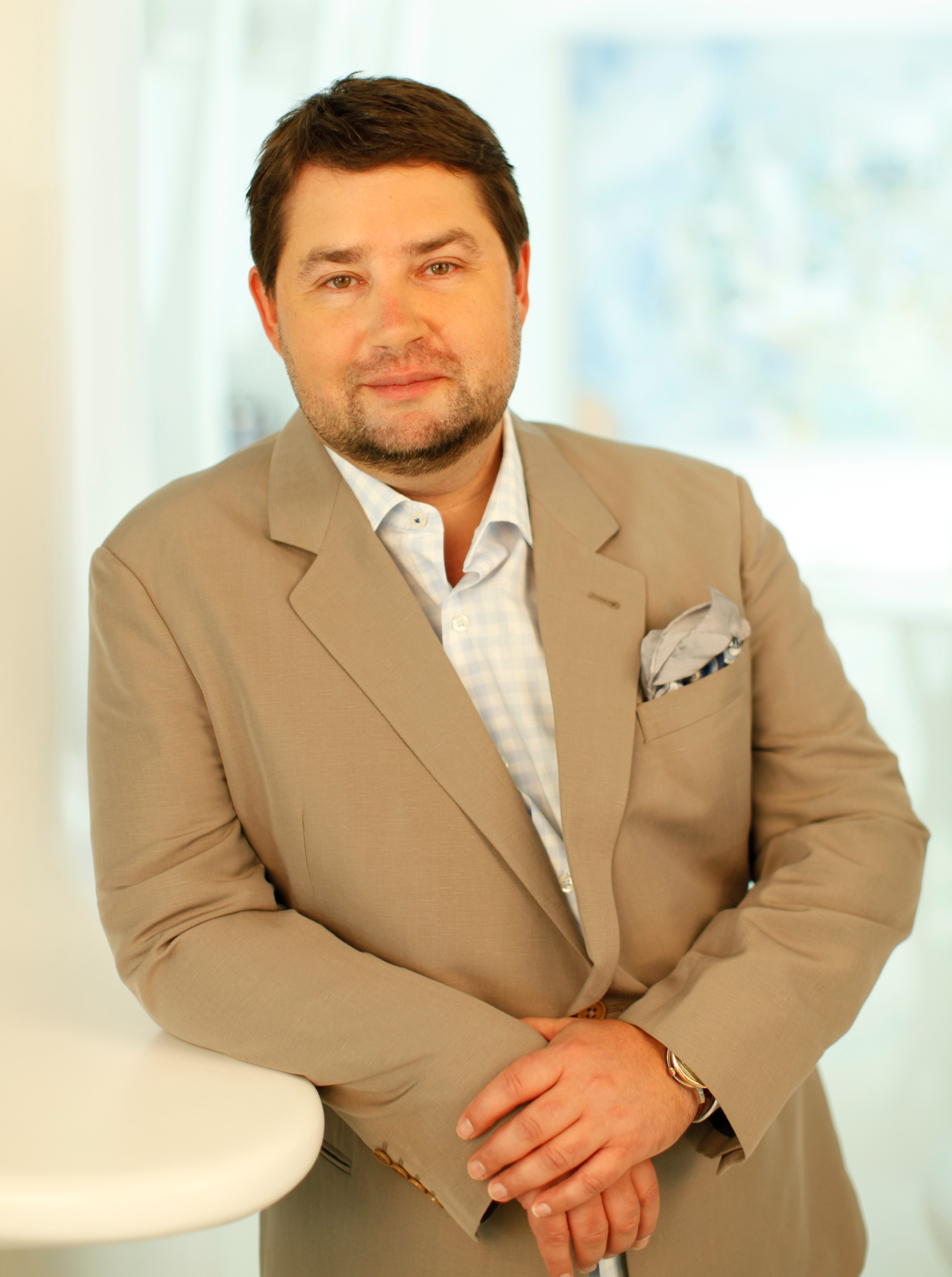
- Born: 2 October 1965
- Died: 27 October 2015 (aged 50)
- Education: Saint Petersburg State Institute of Culture

Igor Yuryevich Nikitin (Russian: Игорь Никитин; October 2, 1965 – October 27, 2015) was a Russian businessman who was the president of the TBN-Russia public television channel, Russian Broadcasting Network international media group, and chairman of the World Christian Council.

== Early life ==
Born on October 2, 1965, in Aleshkino village, of Krasnoyarsk region, Nikitin attended high school No.342 and the Restoration School of Saint-Petersburg. He later graduated from the Saint Petersburg State Institute of Culture as the Director of Mass Holidays.

== Professional career ==
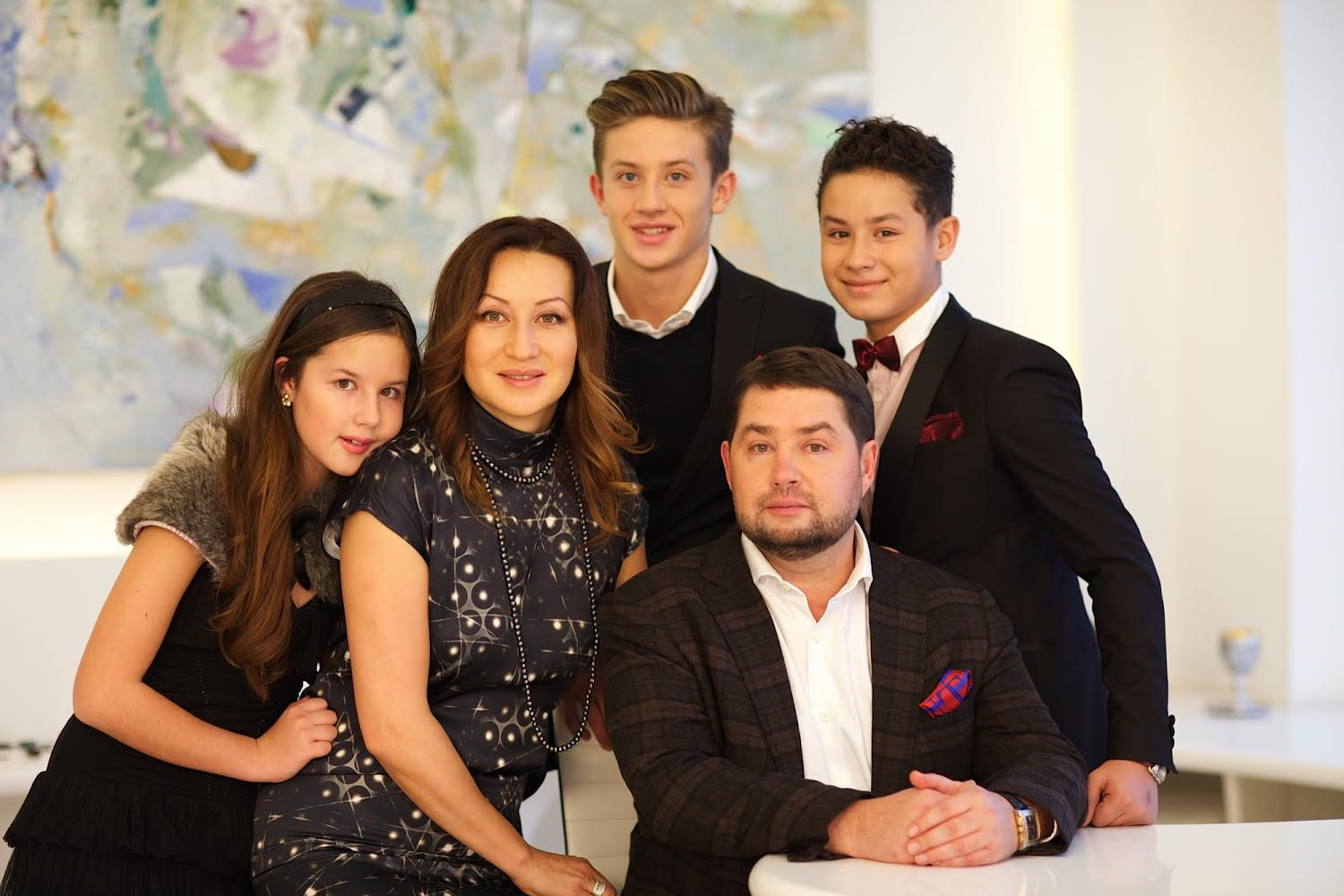
Igor with his family

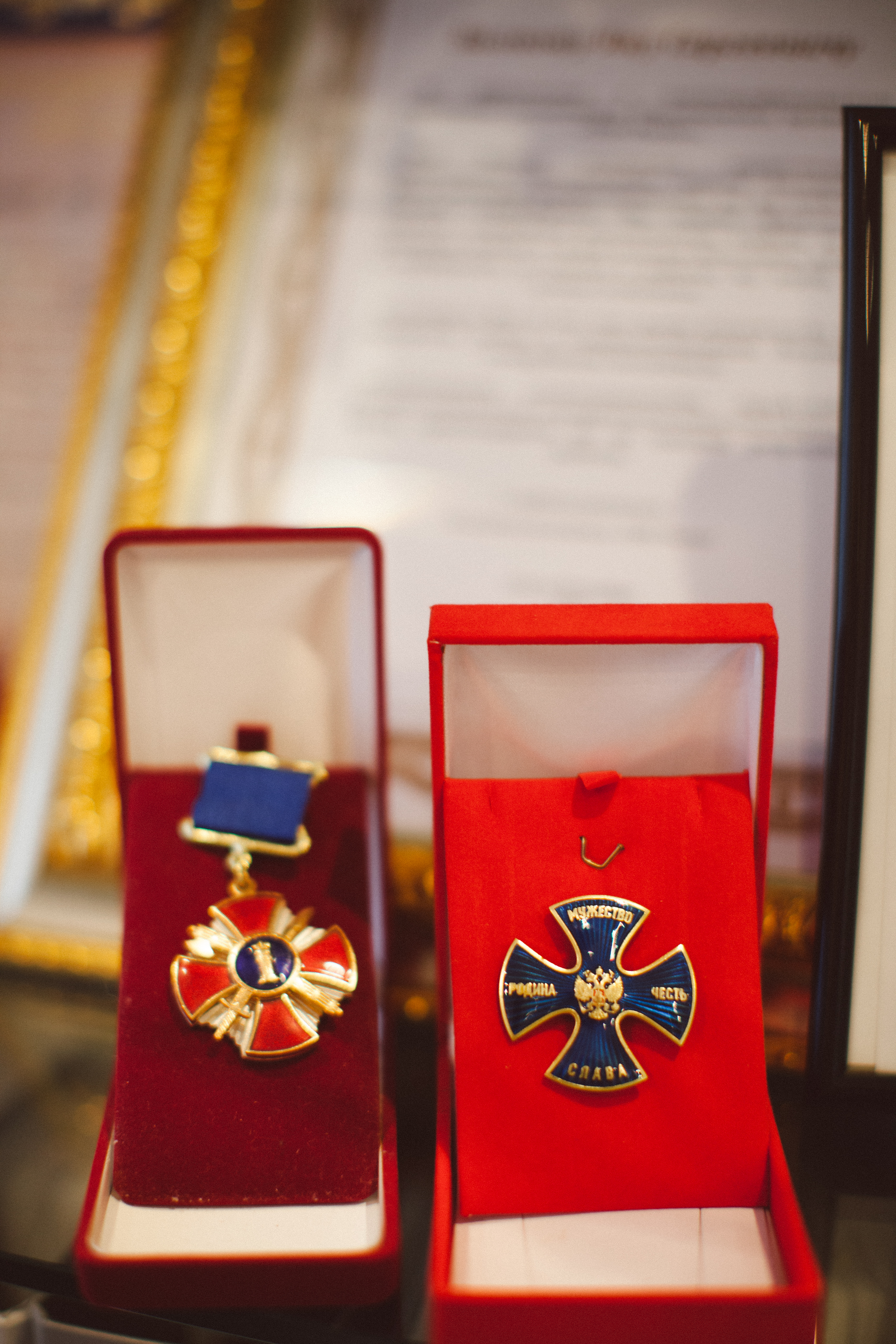
Igor Nikitin awarded with international rewards

Beginning in 1990, Nikitin staged festivals, concerts, and cultural and spiritual events at major venues and stadiums in Russia, CIS countries, USA, India, Korea, and Western Europe, the largest of which were attended by thousands of people. In St. Petersburg alone, thirty-four major events were organized for the city at SKK, the largest venue in St. Petersburg. In 1992, Nikitin began organizing major charity events and humanitarian projects in cooperation with the City of St. Petersburg town council and the Duma deputy, Peter Schleich.

From 1998 onward, Igor Nikitin assisted several charities including centers for drug rehabilitation and alcohol addiction. Nikitin also contributed to the work of re-socialization with inmates released from prison. He then became a member of the Board of Trustees of the Russian Federal Penitentiary Service (Main Directorate of the Federal Penitentiary Service) and played a role in the creation of programs to counter the spread of human trafficking. He spoke actively at OSCE sessions and the Helsinki Commission. Nikitin founded 'Resurrection' TV channel in 1998 for St. Petersburg with the help of the Institute of Telecommunications of Bonch Bruevich. He also began broadcasting programs on regional TV channels 22, 36 and 40, which became the basis for the later creation of the Russian Broadcasting Network media group in 2004. Later on, with partners, he acquired shares of other St. Petersburg and Russian TV channels. In 2001, he began a constant worldwide broadcast on the Express AM-2 satellite.

From the years 2000 to 2003, he furthered his education and acquired a second higher education degree at the Russian Orthodox Christian Humanitarian Academy by receiving a diploma in Religious Studies.

In 2004, he created the Russian Broadcasting Network, which includes television channels that broadcast in over 180 countries around the world, within many of which he opened representative offices and bureaus.

In 2008, he was elected Chairman of the World Christian Council, a major international forum that brings together representatives from 25 countries across four continents. Nikitin cooperated with journalists and editors of major media organizations around the world, taking an active part in international congresses and Russian media forums, including the Congress of the World Association of Russian Press, international exhibitions and CSTB forums, and the National Religious Broadcasters telecommunications exhibition in the United States.

In 2009, he was elected chairman of the World Press Association (WPA).

In 2013, he became a member of the Presidium of the Helping Hand coalition which serves to help Russian-speaking veterans and survivors of the Holocaust. Helping Hand holds concerts and shows at areas like the Latrun and Jerusalem Arena and attempts to resolve humanitarian and social issues. The Helping Hand coalition has implemented a global international Year of Victory project, dedicated to the 70th anniversary of the Victory in the World War II. As a part of public diplomacy, Nikitin visited different countries of the world that are home to a large Russian-speaking population. In addition to meeting with the audience of TV channels, he met with representatives of the governments of these countries, including immigrants from Russia and CIS countries, to draw attention to the Russian-speaking citizens of these countries, their concerns, and their interests.

== Personal life and death ==
Nikitin was married and had three children.

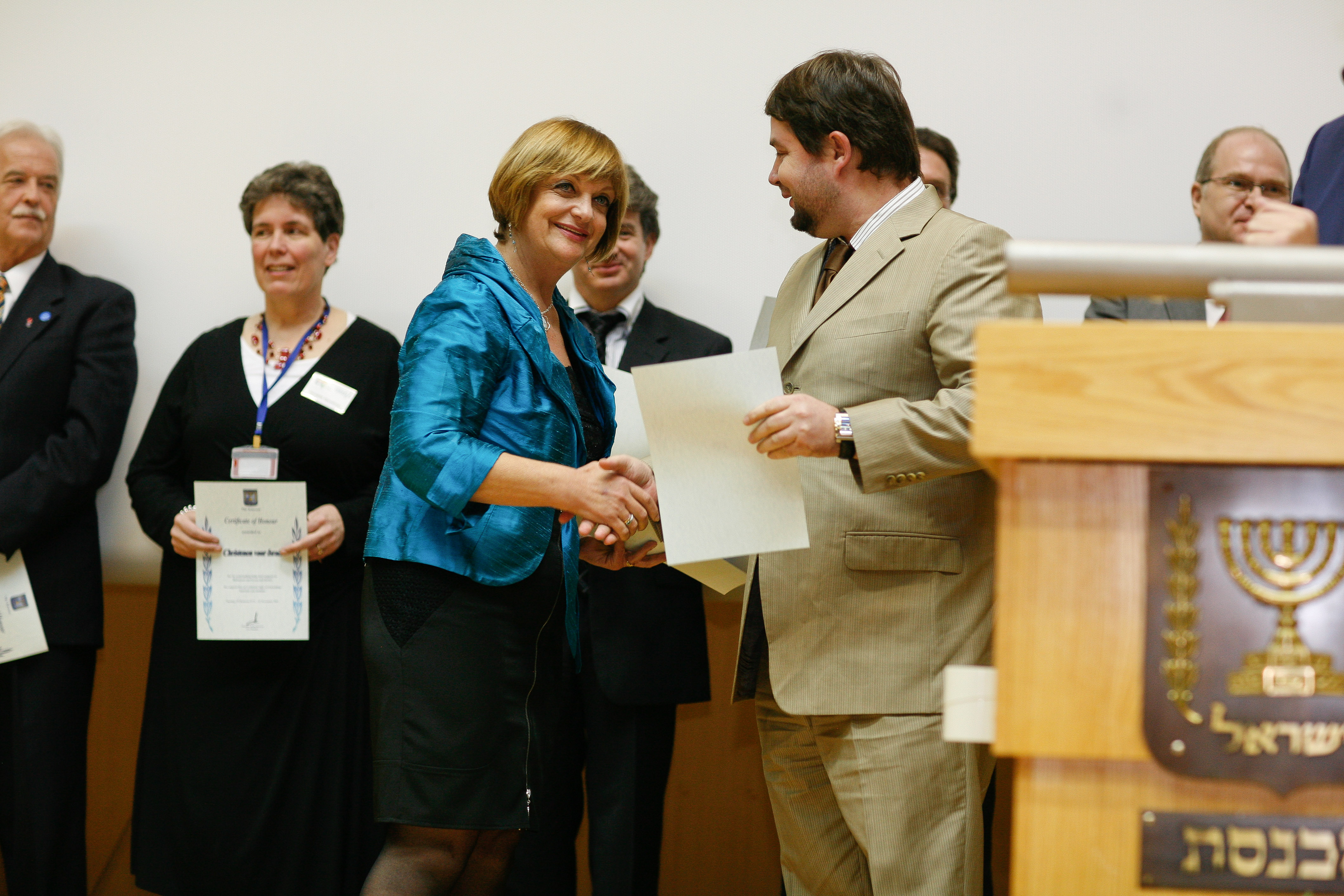
3Igor Yurievych Nikitin being awarded by the speaker of Israeli Knesset – Lia Shemtov

He died on October 27, 2015, after battling a prolonged illness.

== Honors ==
Igor Nikitin received numerous international awards and prizes, including for peacemaking in the Middle East. Among friends and associates of Igor Nikitin were well-known politicians, businessmen, athletes, clergy, and culture and art professionals. He received letters of appreciation from the leaders of the Israeli government and the Israeli Knesset.
