= Alexander Semizyan =

Russian-born Armenian footballer

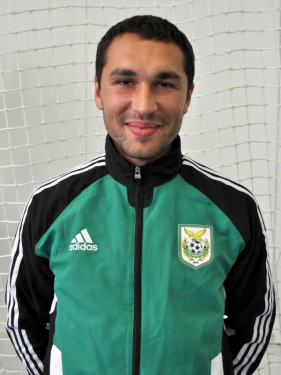
- Semizyan in 2011

Personal information
- Date of birth: 7 March 1985 (age 41)
- Place of birth: Novorossiysk, Russia
- Height: 1.79 m (5 ft 10 in)
- Position: Forward

Senior career*
Years	Team	Apps	(Gls)
2003–2006	FC Chernomorets Novorossiysk	14	(1)
2006	FC Sochi-04	10	(3)
2007	FC Kuban Krasnodar	2	(0)
2009	FC Abinsk	3	(0)
2009	FC Chernomorets Novorossiysk	2	(0)
2011–2013	FC Slavyansky Slavyansk-na-Kubani	40	(5)
- * Club domestic league appearances and goals as of 14:19, 22 June 2013 (UTC)

Alexander Semizyan (Armenian: Ալեքսանդր Սեմիզյան) (born 7 March 1985) is a former Russian-born Armenian football striker.

Semizyan previously played for FC Kuban Krasnodar in the Russian Premier League and FC Chernomorets Novorossiysk and FC Sochi-04 in the Russian First Division.
