= Novorossiysk =

City in Krasnodar Krai, Russia

Novorossiysk Новороссийск
- City
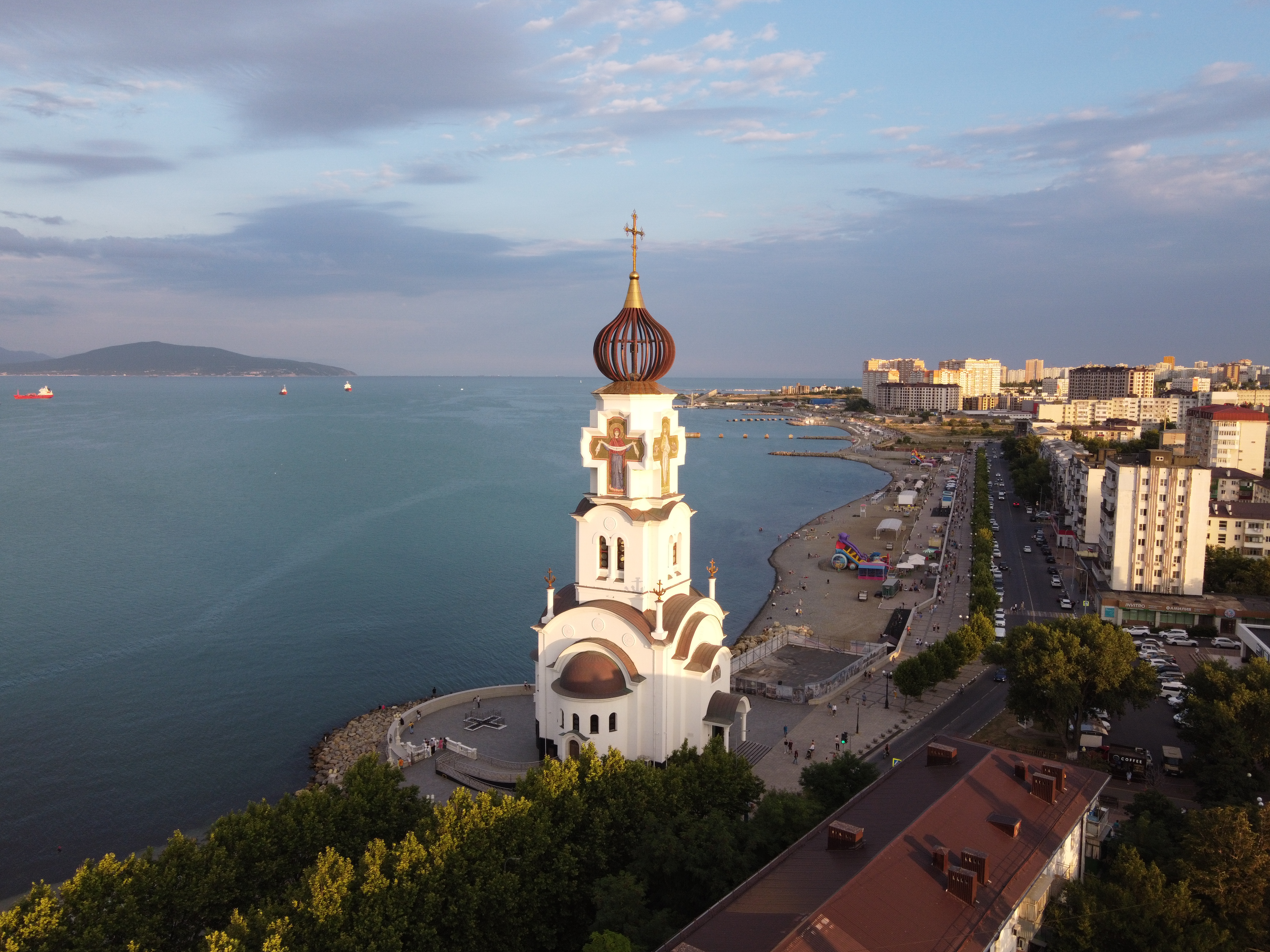

- Flag Coat of arms

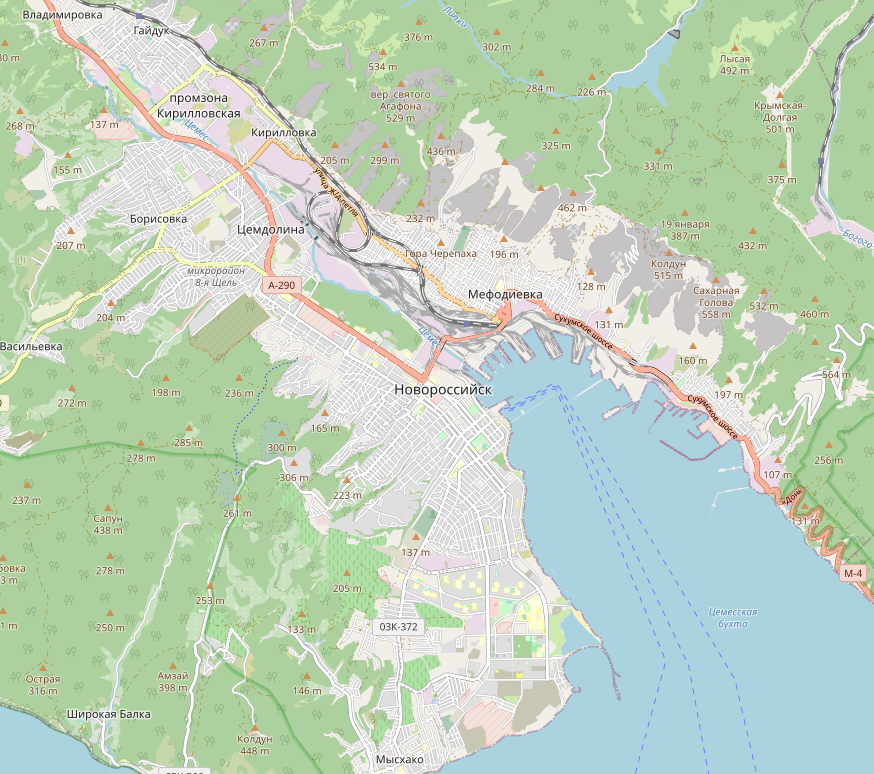
- Interactive map of Novorossiysk
- Location of Novorossiysk Novorossiysk (European Russia) Novorossiysk (Europe)
- Coordinates: 44°43′N 37°47′E
- Country: Russia
- Federal subject: Krasnodar Krai
- Founded: 1838

Government
  - Mayor: Andrey Kravchenko

Area
  - Total: 81.1 km^{2} (31.3 sq mi)
- Elevation: 10 m (33 ft)

Population (2010 Census)
  - Total: 241,952
  - Estimate (2025): 261,973 (+8.3%)
  - Rank: 76th in 2010
  - Density: 2,980/km^{2} (7,730/sq mi)

Administrative status
  - Subordinated to: City of Novorossiysk
  - Capital of: City of Novorossiysk

Municipal status
  - Urban okrug: Novorossiysk Urban Okrug
  - Capital of: Novorossiysk Urban Okrug
- Time zone: UTC+3 (MSK)
- Postal codes: 353900–353903, 353905–353907, 353909–353913, 353915–353925, 353960, 353999
- Dialing code: +7 8617
- OKTMO ID: 03720000001
- City Day: September 12
- Website: admnvrsk.ru

Novorossiysk (Russian: Новоросси́йск, IPA: [nəvərɐˈsʲijsk]; Adyghe: ЦӀэмэз, romanized: C̣ămăz) is a city in Krasnodar Krai, Russia. The port of Novorossiysk is one of the largest ports on the Black Sea. It is one of the cities designated as a Hero City by the Soviet Union. The population is 262,293 (2021 census);

== History ==
In antiquity, the shores of the Tsemes Bay were the site of Bata (Ancient Greek: Βατά), an ancient Greek colony that specialized in the grain trade. It is mentioned in the works of Strabo and Ptolemy, among others.

Following brief periods of Roman and Khazar control, from the 9th century onwards, the area was part of the Byzantine θέμα Χερσῶνος Thema Khersonos (Province of Cherson).

During the 11th century, the area was overrun and controlled by nomads from the Eurasian steppe, led by the Cumans. Later that century, the Byzantine emperor Ἀλέξιος Κομνηνός Alexios I Komnenos (r. 1081–1118) was approached by Anglo-Saxon refugees, who had left England following the Norman Conquest. Alexios offered land to these refugees in Thema Khersonos if they could recapture it from the nomads and there is contemporaneous evidence that a Byzantine-English colony was subsequently founded. For example, medieval nautical charts mention place names on the Kuban coast with possible English origins, including a port (located within or near the future site of Novorossiysk) known as Susaco (or Susacho) – a name that may have been derived from Sussex. (The same maps also show, north-west of Susaco, a river Londina, which may derive its name from London.)

In the 13th century, Genoese merchants from the Ghisolfi family maintained a trade outpost in the area. A 2007 archaeological investigation of related sites discovered some interesting items.

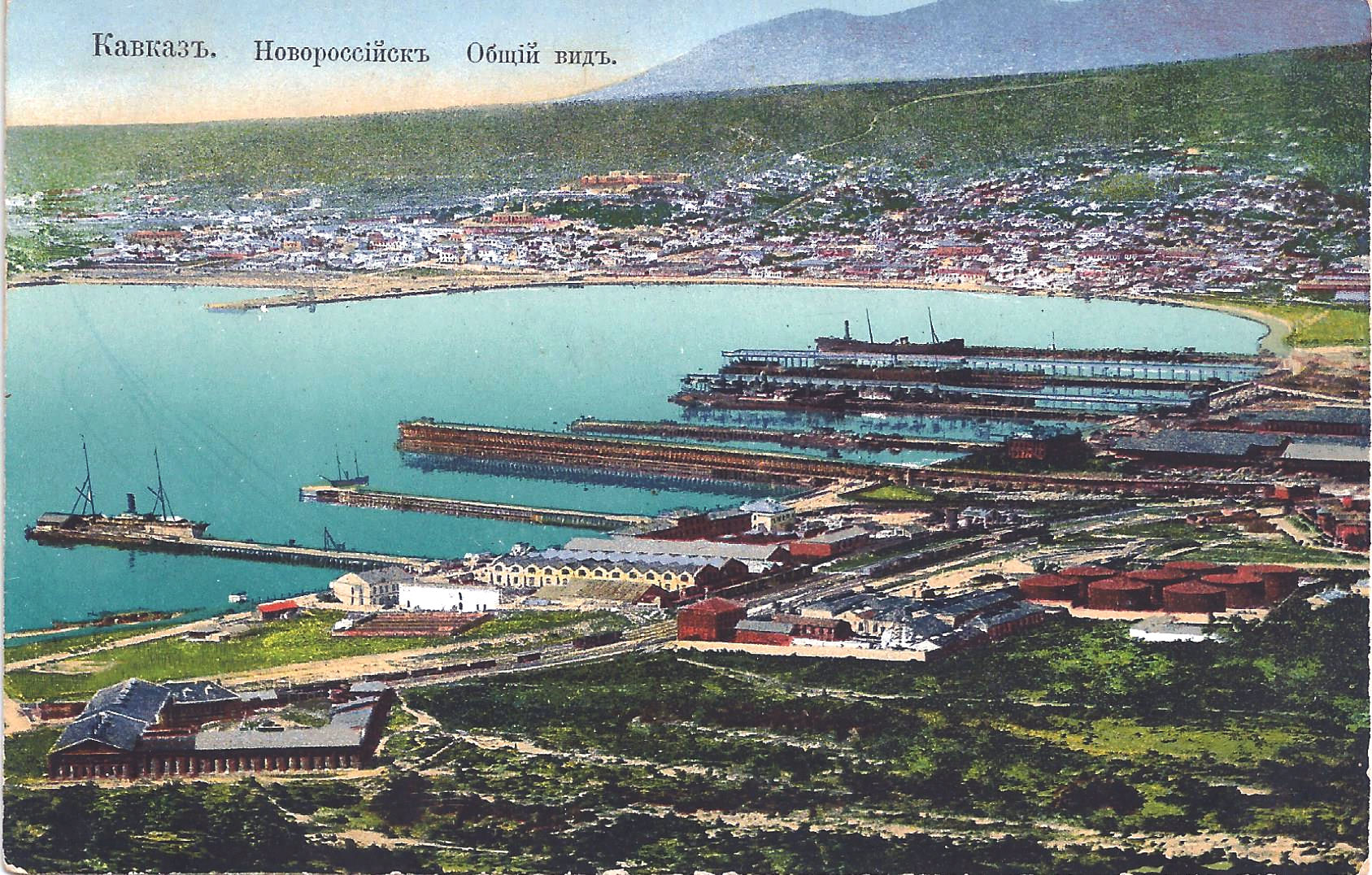
General view from the early 20th century

During the rest of the 19th century, Novorossiysk developed rapidly. It was granted city status in 1866 and became the capital of the Novorossiysk Okrug and Black Sea Governorate, the smallest in the Russian Empire, in 1896. In December 1905, the city was the seat of the short-lived Novorossiysk Republic. From August 26, 1918, until March 27, 1920, the city was used as the principal center of Denikin's White Army during the Russian Civil War. Denikin's South Russian Government was moved to Crimea and many Whites escaped from Novorossiysk to Constantinople during the Evacuation of Novorossiysk (1920), with the help of Allied warships.

According to the 1926 census, the population was 52.8% Russian, 22.8% Ukrainian, 6.1% Armenian, 3.4% Belarusian, 2.8% Jewish, 2.2% Greek, 1.4% Polish, and 0.9% Czech.

During World War II, most of the city was occupied by the German and Romanian Armies on September 10, 1942. A small unit of Soviet sailors defended one part of the city, known as Malaya Zemlya, for 225 days beginning on February 4, 1943, until the town was liberated by the Red Army on September 16, 1943. The defense of the port by the sailors allowed the Soviets to retain possession of the city's bay, which prevented the Axis from using the port for supply shipments. Novorossiysk was awarded the title of Hero City in 1973.

In 1960, the town was commemorated in Dmitri Shostakovich's work Novorossiysk Chimes, the Flame of Eternal Glory (Opus 111b).

In 2003, President Vladimir Putin signed a decree setting up a naval base for the Black Sea Fleet in Novorossiysk. Russia allocated 12.3 billion rubles (about $480 million) for the construction of the new base between 2007 and 2012. The construction of other facilities and infrastructure at the base, including units for coastal troops, aviation and logistics, continued after 2012. Russia planned to move the Black Sea Fleet with 80 warships and its headquarters from Sevastopol to the Novorossiysk base in 2020.

The Russian lease on port facilities in Sevastopol, which, though the main base of Russia's Black Sea Fleet, was part of Ukraine, was set to expire in 2017. Ukraine was reported to be planning not to renew the lease; however, in April 2010 the Russian and Ukrainian presidents signed an agreement to extend the lease by twenty-five years, with an option of further extension of five years after the new term expires. However, in 2014, Crimea was militarily occupied by the Russian Armed Forces during the 2014 Crimean crisis in February. Crimea was annexed by the Russian Federation in March 2014, and as such the question of the lease became moot.

== Administrative and municipal status ==
Within the framework of administrative divisions, it is, together with twenty-four rural localities, incorporated as the City of Novorossiysk—an administrative unit with the status equal to that of the districts. As a municipal division, the City of Novorossiysk is incorporated as Novorossiysk Urban Okrug.

=== Coat of arms of Novorossiysk ===
The coat of arms of Novorossiysk was officially approved by Emperor Nicholas II on October 15, 1914. The description of the coat of arms was as follows: in a golden field above a black wavy tip, a black double-headed eagle under a crown, in the paws of an eagle a scepter and a power, on the chest a scarlet shield in which a golden Orthodox cross above a silver inverted crescent. In 1994, the Soviet coat of arms was changed to a new one. In 2006, the coat of arms of 1914 was re-adopted with minor changes (a crown was added). The description of the modern coat of arms sounds like this in official sources: In a gold shield with a black wavy tip is a black double-headed eagle crowned with an Imperial crown, with a scepter and a power in its paws, on the wings of which is a shield, in the scarlet field of which is a golden Orthodox eight-pointed cross mounted on a silver inverted crescent. The shield is crowned with a golden five-pronged tower crown.

Coats Novorossiysk
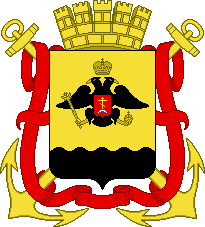
Coat of Arms (1914)

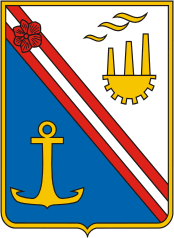
Coat of Arms (1968)

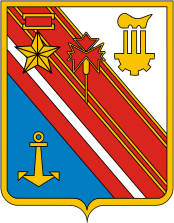
Coat of Arms (1974)

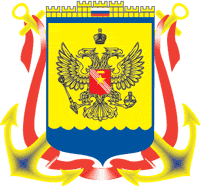
Coat of Arms (1994)

Coat of Arms (2006)

== Geography ==
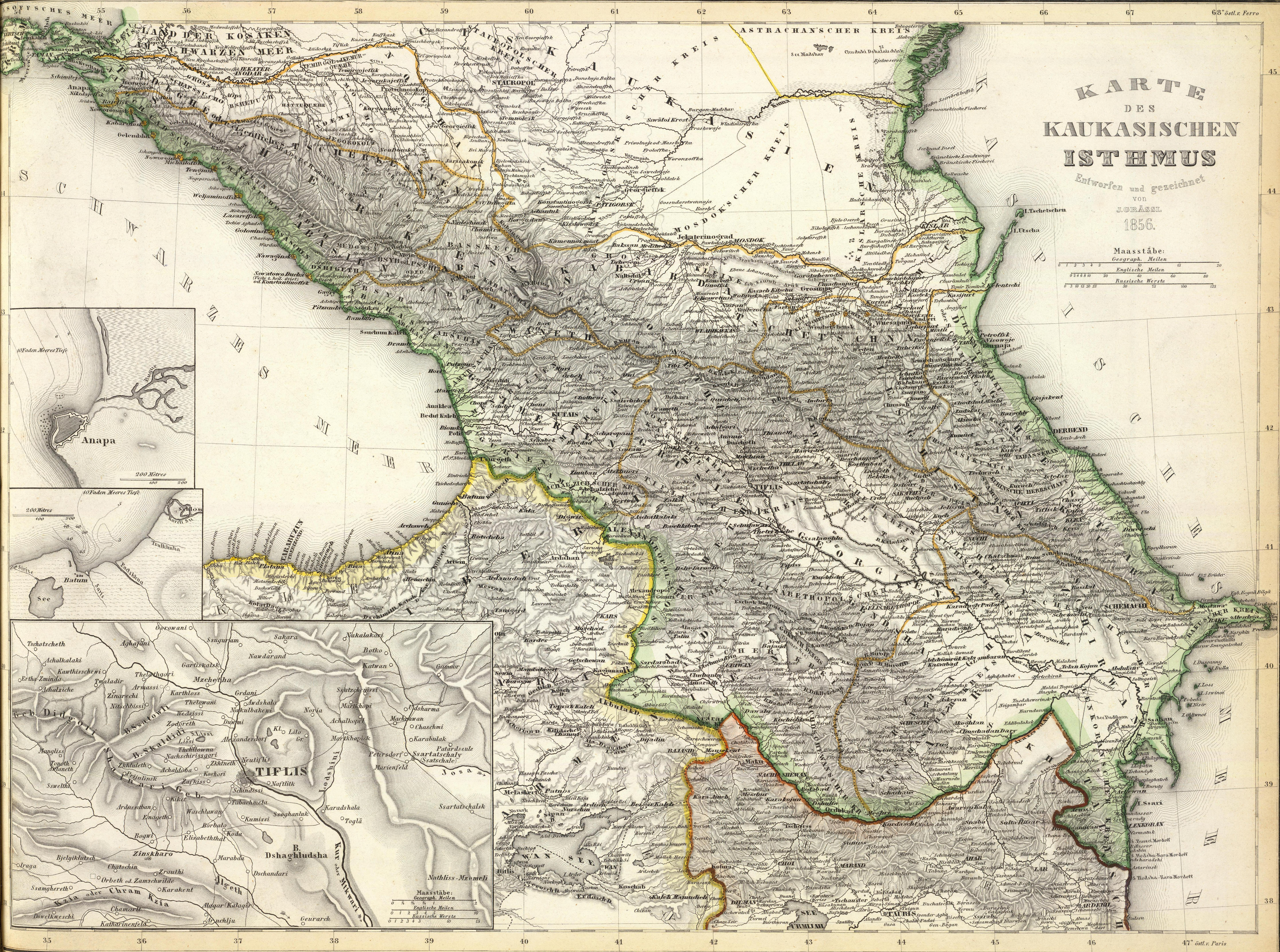
"A Map of The Caucasian Isthmus". Designed and drawn by J. Grassl, 1856.

The city is located on the Black Sea. It is not a resort town, but Anapa to the north and Gelendzhik to the south are. There are several urban settlements under the jurisdiction of Novorossiysk. The most famous is Abrau-Dyurso, which consists of a townlet on the shore of Lake Abrau and a village on the coast of the Black Sea, connected by a winding mountain road.

The area of Novorossiysk is one of Russia's main wine-growing regions. The wineries of Abrau-Dyurso, established by Tsar Alexander III in 1870, produce table and sparkling wines for domestic consumption.

=== Climate ===
Novorossiysk has a borderline humid subtropical (Cfa) and Mediterranean climate (Csa) in the Köppen climate classification. Since the driest month has 36 mm (1.4 inches) and may or may not happen consistently in the summer, the city cannot be classified as solely humid subtropical or Mediterranean. It features somewhat short, cool (mild by Russian standards), and wet winters, and very warm, somewhat drier summers.

Climate data for Novorossiysk (1936-1987)
Month	Jan	Feb	Mar	Apr	May	Jun	Jul	Aug	Sep	Oct	Nov	Dec	Year
Record high °C (°F)	22.8 (73.0)	21.0 (69.8)	25.0 (77.0)	28.0 (82.4)	31.8 (89.2)	38.0 (100.4)	39.0 (102.2)	36.1 (97.0)	34.0 (93.2)	30.0 (86.0)	28.0 (82.4)	25.0 (77.0)	39.0 (102.2)
Mean daily maximum °C (°F)	6.1 (43.0)	6.5 (43.7)	9.7 (49.5)	15.0 (59.0)	19.6 (67.3)	24.1 (75.4)	27.6 (81.7)	27.7 (81.9)	23.1 (73.6)	17.2 (63.0)	12.7 (54.9)	8.8 (47.8)	16.5 (61.7)
Daily mean °C (°F)	2.9 (37.2)	3.6 (38.5)	6.3 (43.3)	11.5 (52.7)	16.2 (61.2)	20.5 (68.9)	23.8 (74.8)	23.5 (74.3)	18.9 (66.0)	13.4 (56.1)	9.4 (48.9)	5.9 (42.6)	13.0 (55.4)
Mean daily minimum °C (°F)	−0.2 (31.6)	0.5 (32.9)	3.1 (37.6)	8.2 (46.8)	12.9 (55.2)	16.9 (62.4)	20.0 (68.0)	19.7 (67.5)	15.1 (59.2)	9.8 (49.6)	6.2 (43.2)	2.8 (37.0)	9.5 (49.1)
Record low °C (°F)	−18.0 (−0.4)	−17.0 (1.4)	−12.2 (10.0)	−5.0 (23.0)	−1.1 (30.0)	2.0 (35.6)	8.0 (46.4)	10.0 (50.0)	4.7 (40.5)	−2.0 (28.4)	−6.1 (21.0)	−13.0 (8.6)	−18.0 (−0.4)
Average precipitation mm (inches)	125.6 (4.94)	76.6 (3.02)	104.7 (4.12)	58.6 (2.31)	41.5 (1.63)	49.9 (1.96)	38.5 (1.52)	50.9 (2.00)	35.9 (1.41)	61.0 (2.40)	61.4 (2.42)	156.2 (6.15)	860.2 (33.87)
Average precipitation days	8.6	6.9	6.8	6.3	5.3	5.0	3.6	3.2	3.6	5.0	6.1	9.4	69.8
Source: climatebase.ru

== Demographics ==
Historical population

Year	Pop.	±%
1897	16,897	—
1926	67,941	+302.1%
1939	95,240	+40.2%
1959	93,461	−1.9%
1970	132,744	+42.0%

Year	Pop.	±%
1979	159,135	+19.9%
1989	185,938	+16.8%
2002	232,079	+24.8%
2010	241,952	+4.3%
2021	262,293	+8.4%

Source: Census data

== Economy ==
The city sprawls along the shore of the non-freezing Tsemess Bay, which has been recognized since antiquity as one of the superior bays of the Black Sea. The Novorossiysk Commercial Sea Port–with the market capitalization of $1.11 billion and shares listed at Moscow Exchange and London Stock Exchange–serves Russian sea trade with regions of Asia, Middle East, Africa, Mediterranean, and South America. It is the busiest oil port in the Black Sea and the terminus of the pipeline from the Tengiz Field in Kazakhstan, developed by the Caspian Pipeline Consortium.

Novorossiysk is also an industrial city, dependent on steel, food processing, and the production of metal goods and other manufactures. Extensive limestone quarries supply important cement factories in and around the city. The town is home to the Maritime State Academy and Novorossiysk Polytechnic Institute.

== Transportation ==
Novorossiysk is the biggest Russian seaport. In 2019, cargo turnover amounted to 142.5m tons. In 2021, cargo turnover amounted to 105,2m tons.

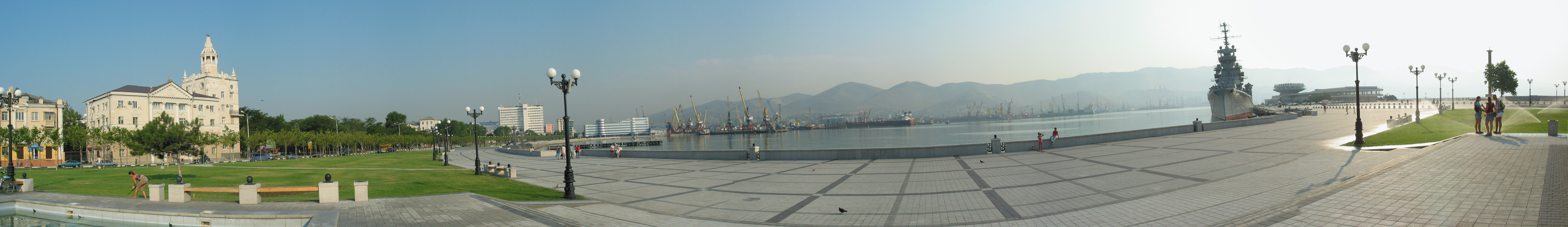
A panoramic view of the port

Novorossiysk is connected by rail and highways to the main industrial and population centres of Russia, Transcaucasia, and Central Asia. It is served by the Novorossiysk railway station.

The closest airports (Gelendzhik Airport, Anapa Airport and Krasnodar Airport, situated 33 km (21 mi), 53 km (33 mi) and 172 km (107 mi) away from the city, respectively, offer flights to many cities in Russia.

== Sports ==
The city's association football team, FC Chernomorets Novorossiysk, plays in the Russian second Division.

== Buildings and structures ==
- Novorossiysk TV Tower
- Shopping Mall "Krasnaya Ploshchad"
- "Lenin's" Amusement Park
- Malaya Zemlya Memorial

== Notable residents ==
- Georges Gurvitch (1894–1965), Russian-French sociologist and philosopher
- Seitumer Emin (1921–2004), Crimean Tatar writer and civil rights activist
- Artur Minosyan (born 1989), Russian former professional football player of Armenian descent
- Ida Nudel (1931–2021), refusenik and Israeli activist
- Eugene Kaspersky (born 1956), founder of Kaspersky Labs
- Eduard Sarkisov (born 1971), football coach and a former player
- Alexander Semizyan (born 1985), former Russian-born Armenian football striker
- Emir-Usein Kuku (born 1976), Crimean Tatar human rights defender
- Viktor Petrovich Skarzhinsky (1787–1861), chamberlain, Novorossiysk landowner and forester, Kherson provincial leader of the nobility

== Twin towns and sister cities ==
Novorossiysk is twinned with:

Plymouth, United Kingdom (since 1956)Suspended 2022; Livorno, Italy (since 1967); Valparaíso, Chile (since 1968); Gijón, Spain (since 1986); Gainesville, Florida, United States (since 1988); Varna, Bulgaria (since 1999)	Pula, Croatia (since 1999); Constanța, Romania (since 2002); Samsun, Turkey (since 2007); Tomsk, Russia (since 2008); Gavar, Armenia (since 2009); Novo Mesto, Slovenia (since 2010); Heilbronn, Germany (since 2019)

== Gallery ==
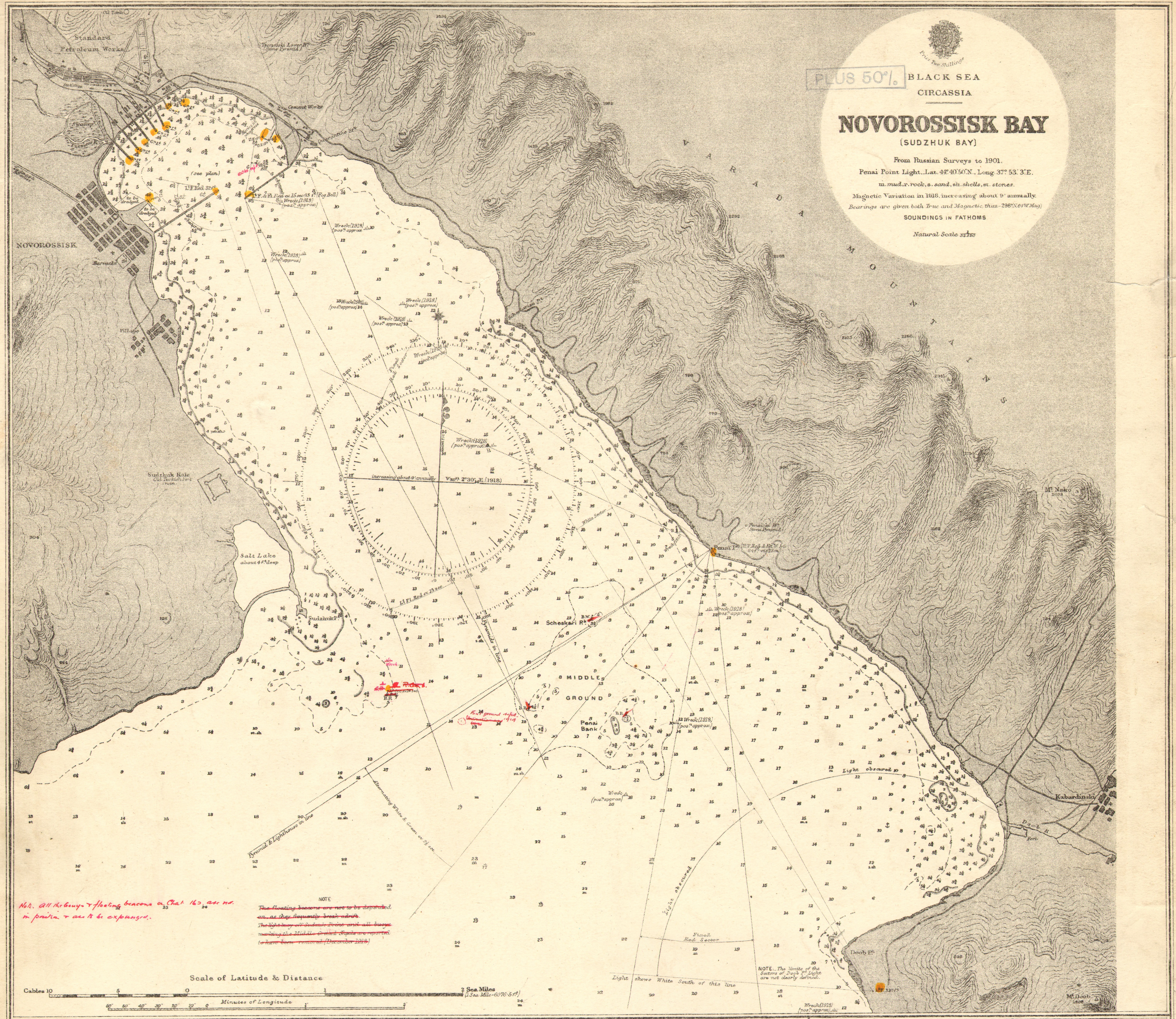
Novorossiysk in 1919, from an Admiralty chart

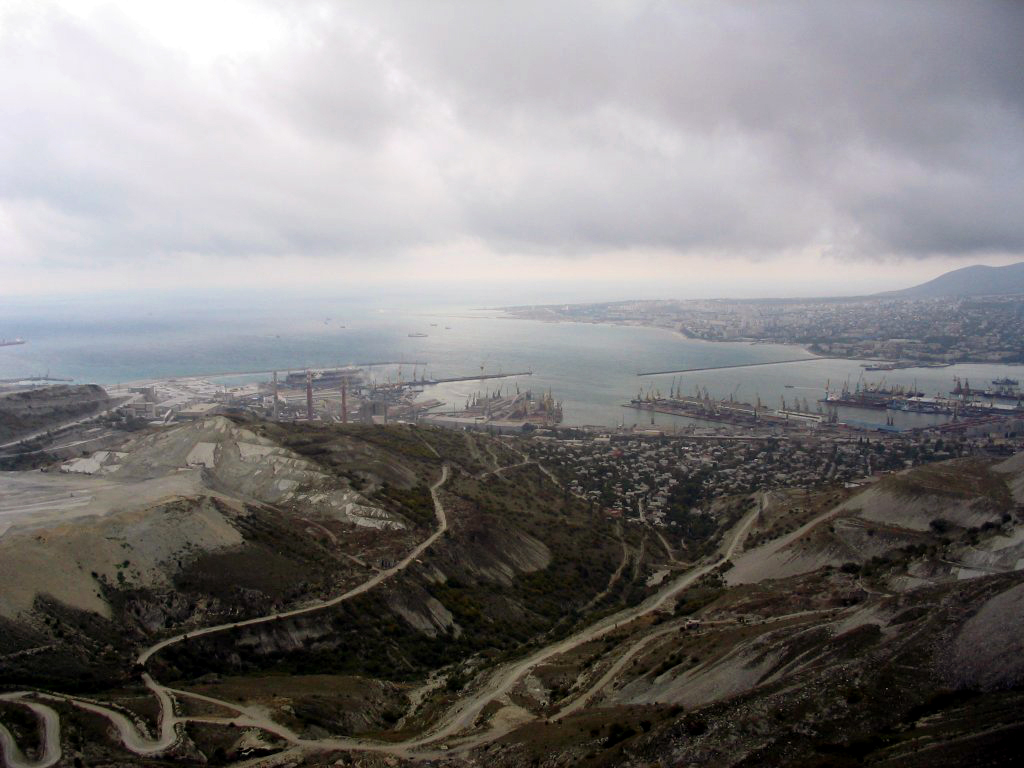
A panoramic view of the Tsemess Bay

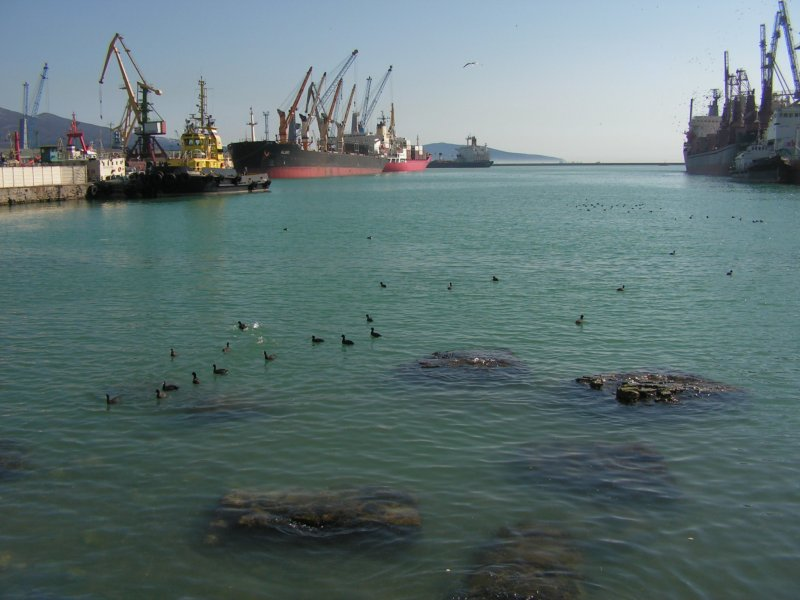
The port of Novorossiysk

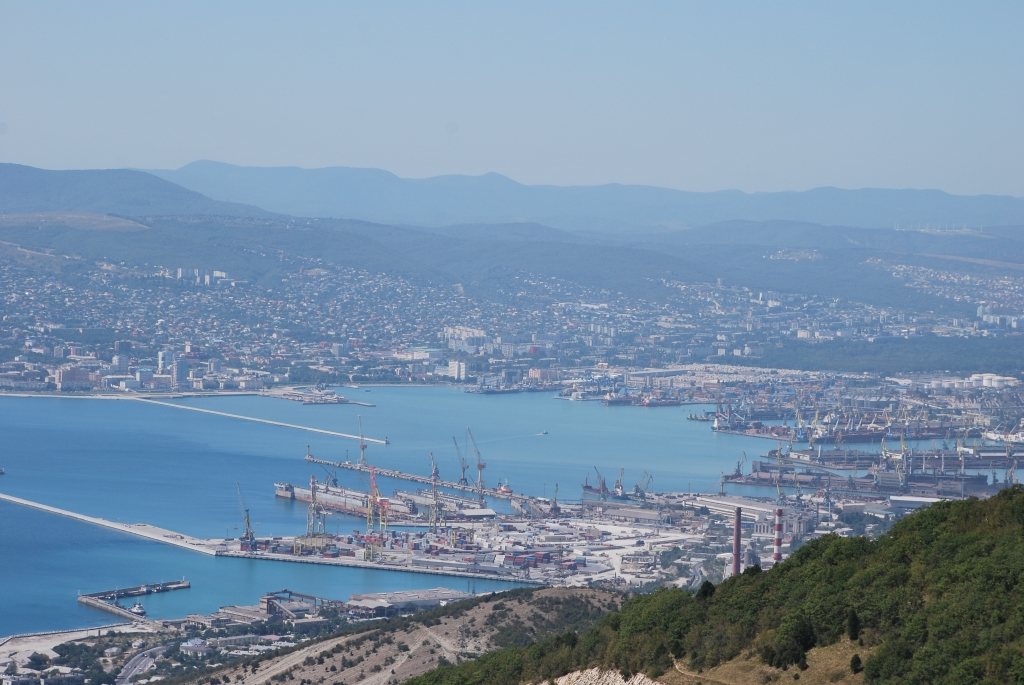
Overview of Novorossiysk, August 2010
